= Kropyvnytskyi =

City in Kirovohrad Oblast, Ukraine

Kropyvnytskyi Кропивницький
- City
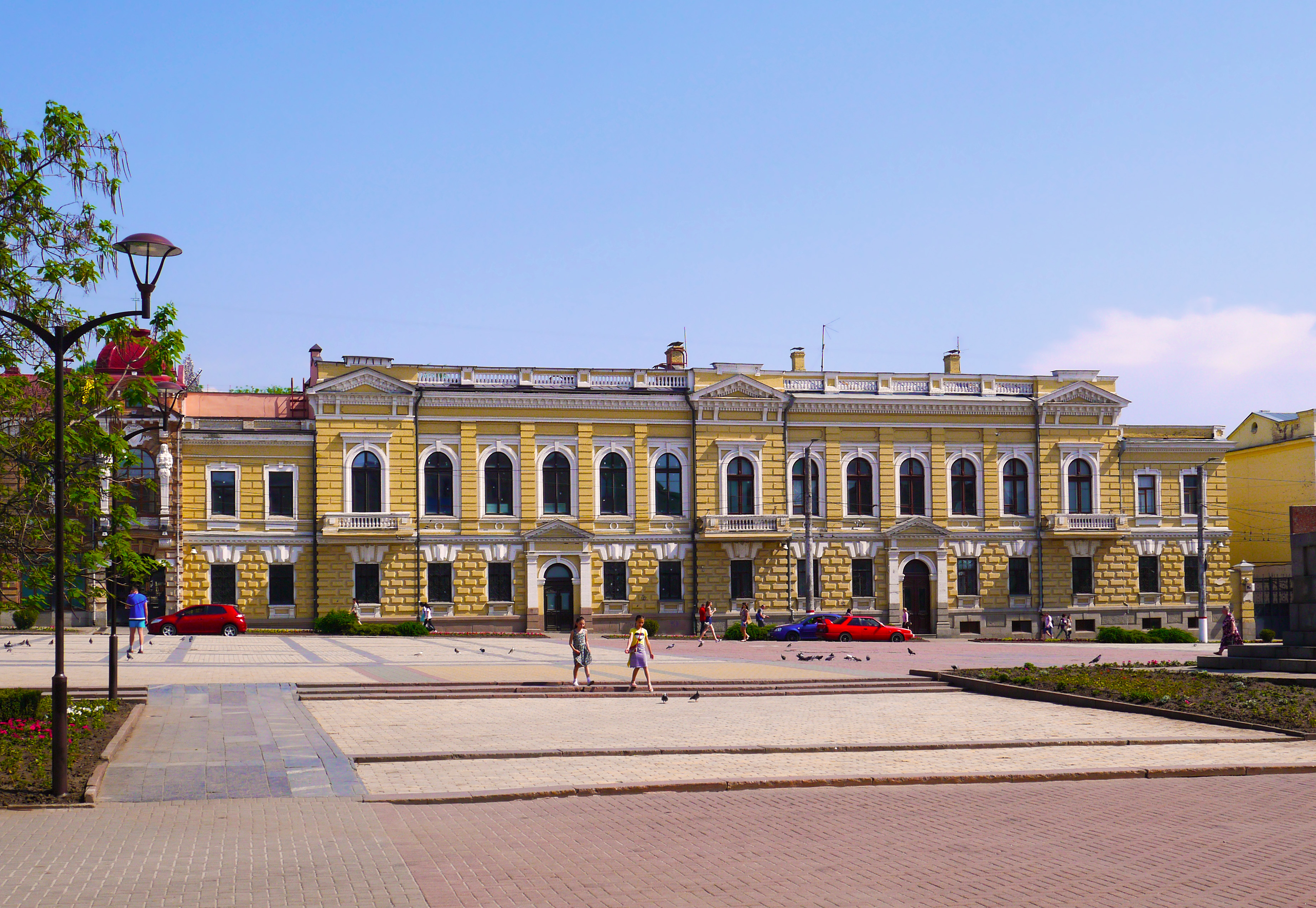
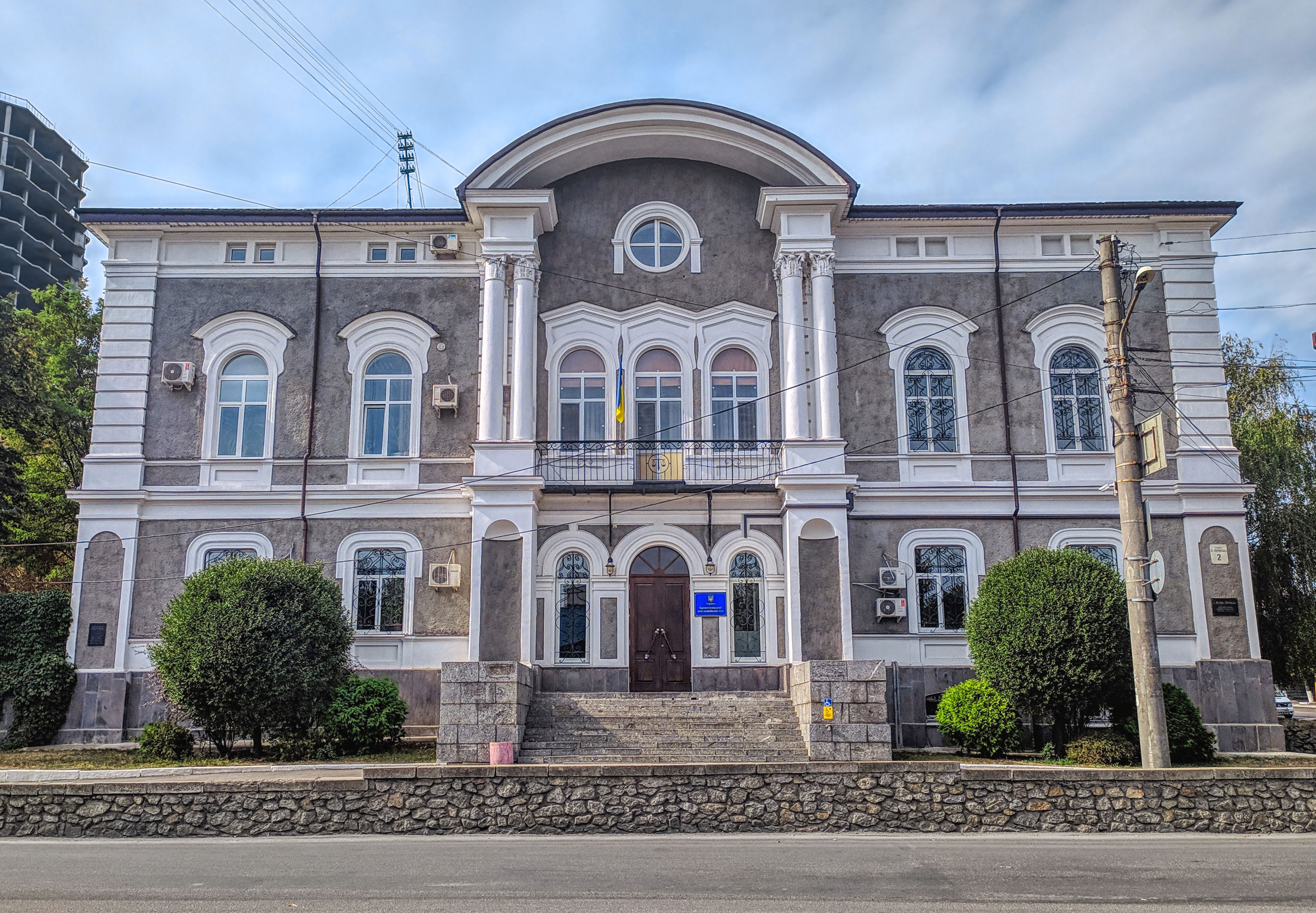
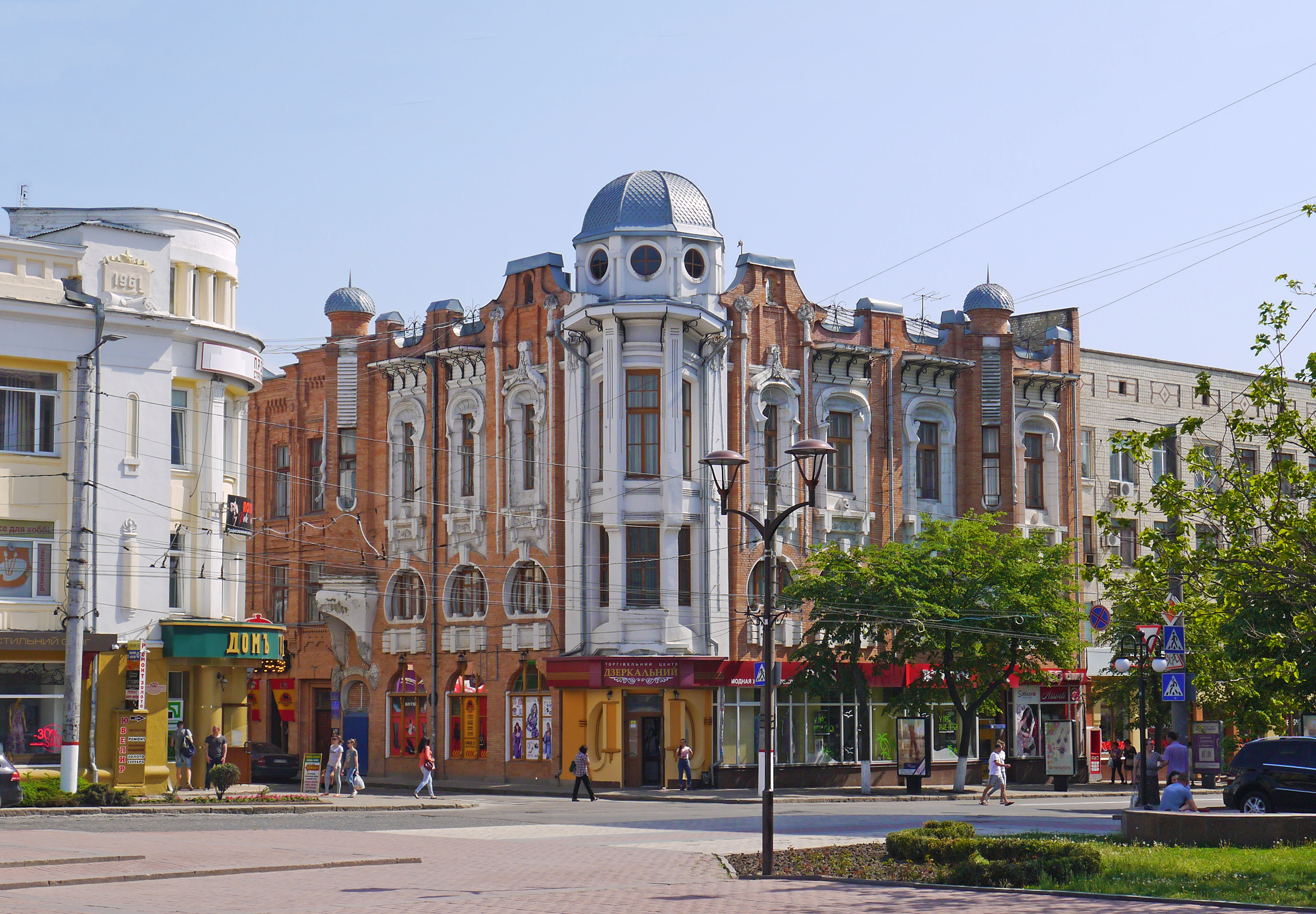
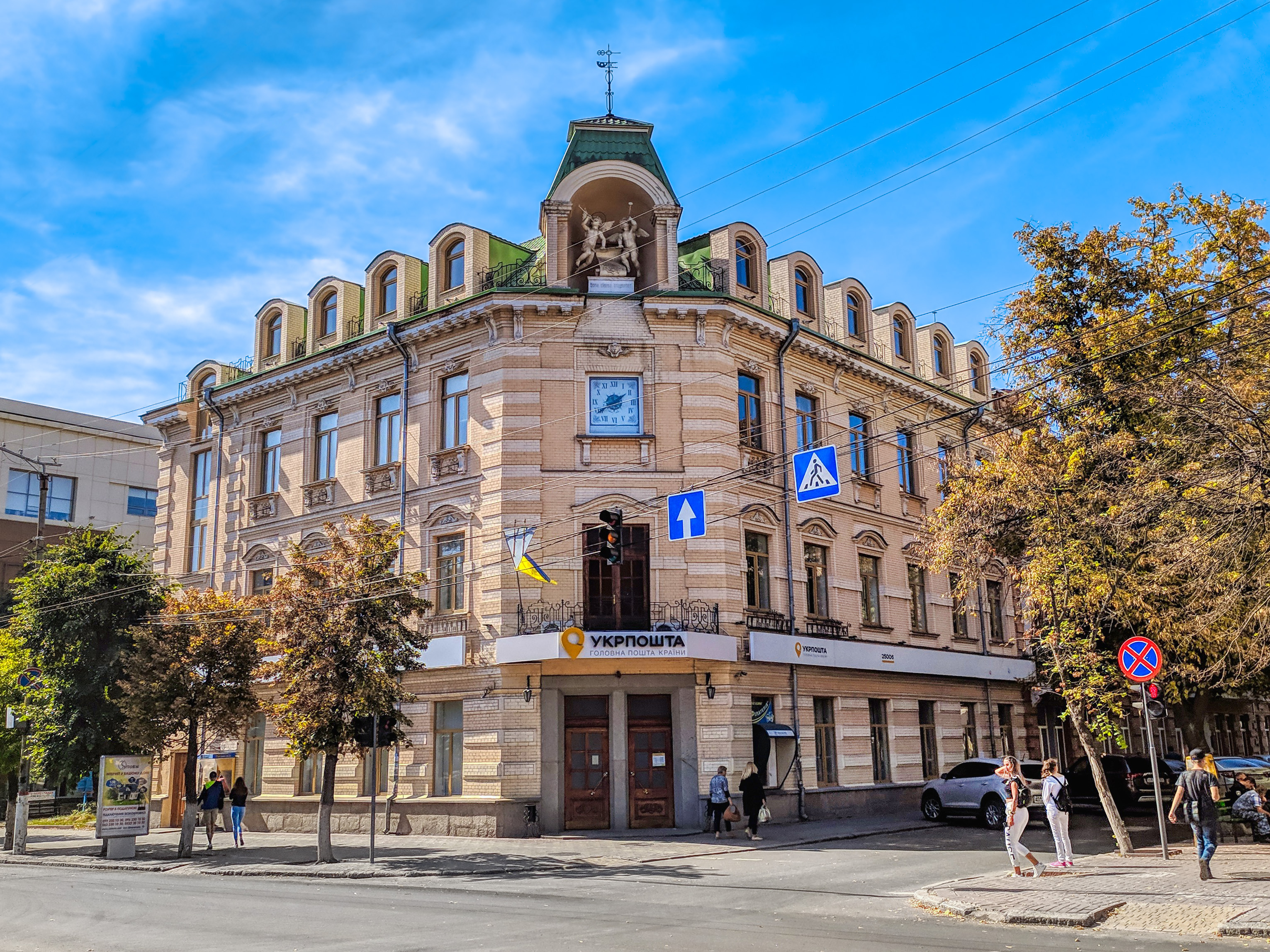
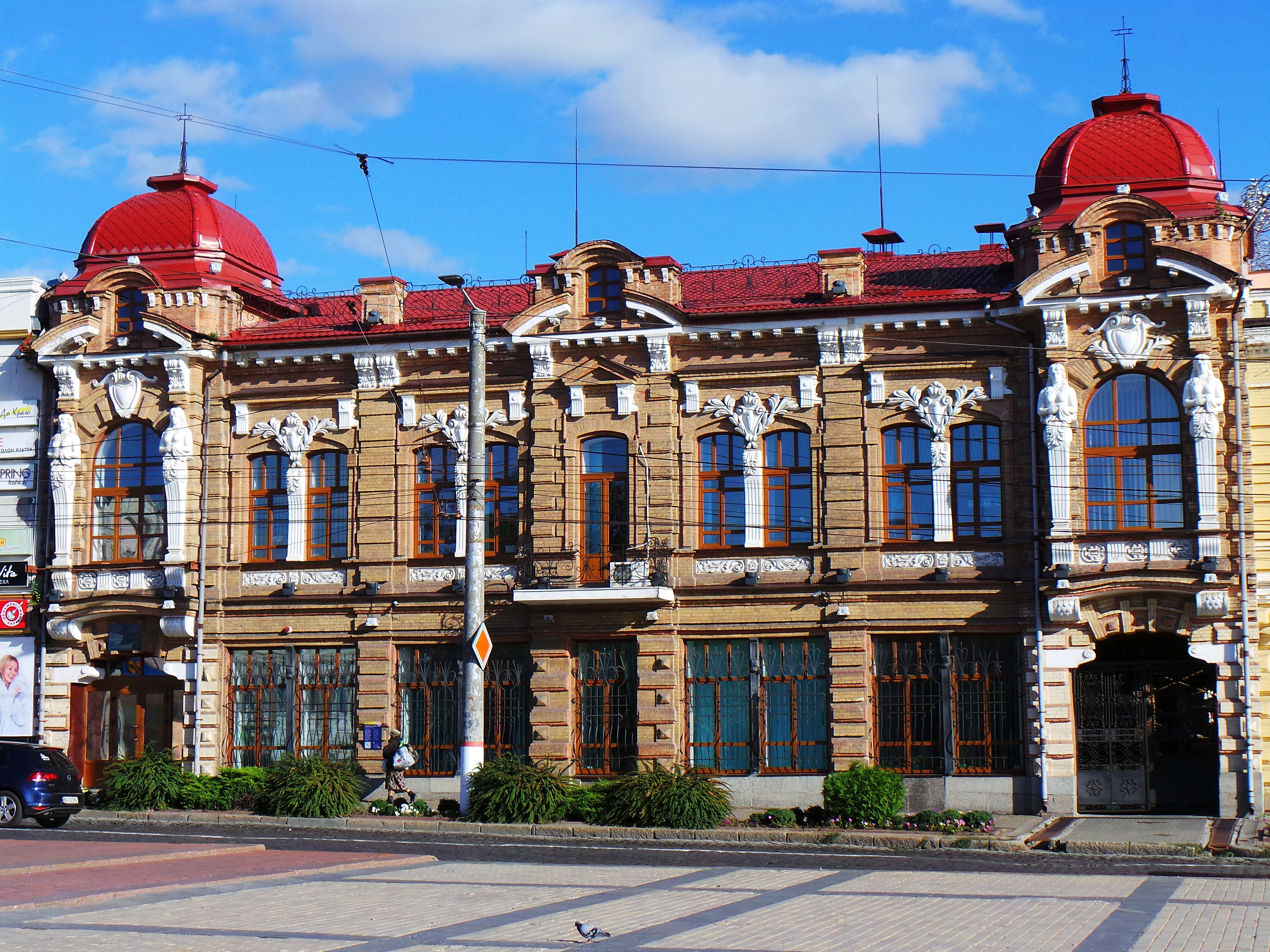
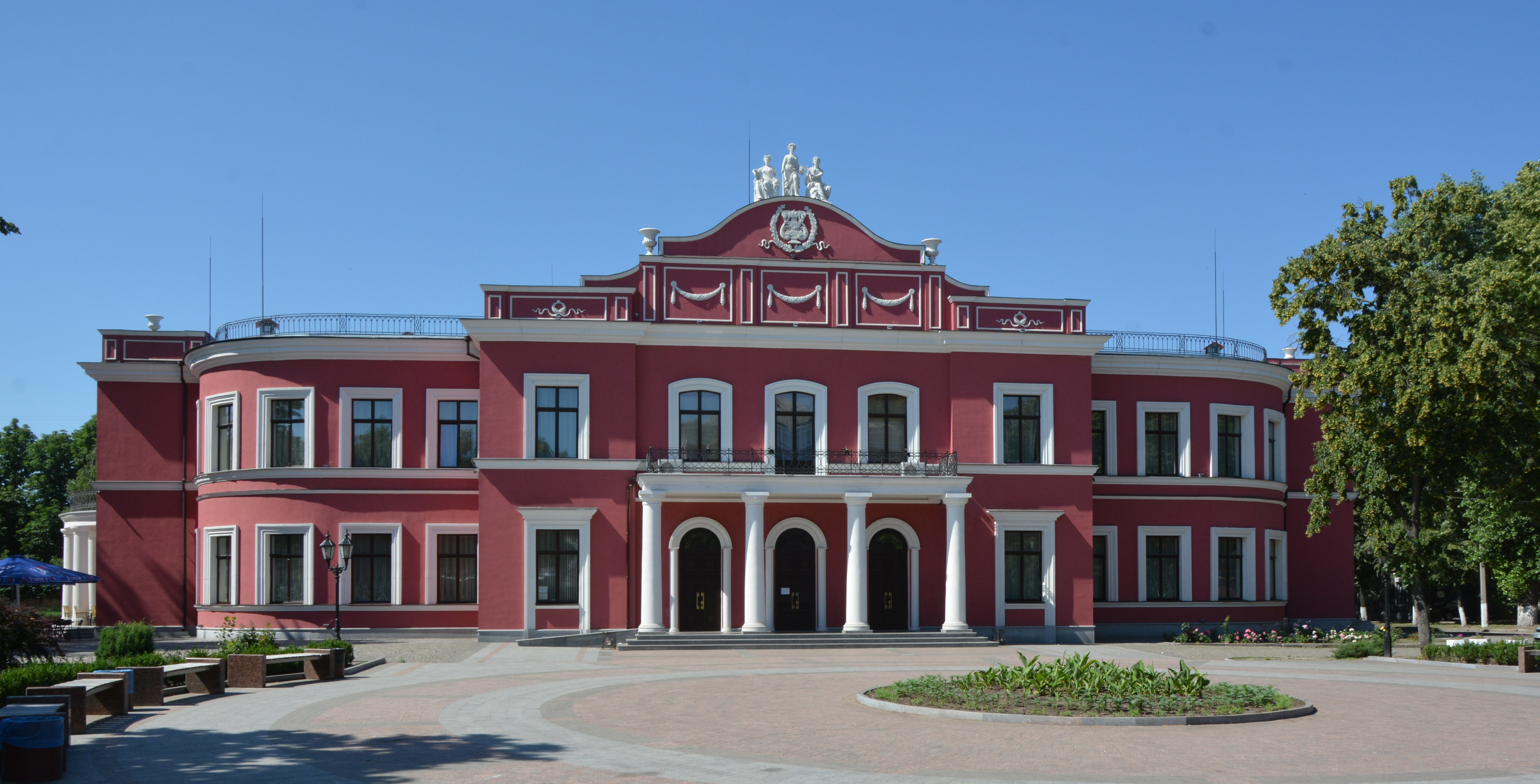
- Former Bank Former Regional Court Former Revenue House Former Post and Telegram Office Pivnichnyi Hotel Winter Theater

- Flag Coat of arms Logo
- Nickname: Little Paris
- Motto(s): With peace and goodness
- Interactive map of Kropyvnytskyi
- Location of Kropyvnytskyi Kropyvnytskyi (Ukraine)
- Coordinates: 48°30′0″N 32°16′0″E
- Country: Ukraine
- Oblast: Kirovohrad Oblast
- Raion: Kropyvnytskyi Raion
- Hromada: Kropyvnytskyi urban hromada
- Founded: 1754
- City rights: 1765, 1782
- Districts: List of 2: Fortechnyi District; Podilskyi District

Government
  - Mayor: Oleksandr Mosin (acting)

Area
  - City: 103 km^{2} (40 sq mi)
- Elevation: 124 m (407 ft)

Population (2022)
  - City: 219,676
  - Rank: 29th in Ukraine
  - Density: 2,130/km^{2} (5,520/sq mi)
  - Metro: 233,820
- Postal code: 25000-490
- Area code: +380 522
- Sister cities: Krefeld, Shaoxing, Venlo
- Website: kr-rada.gov.ua

Kropyvnytskyi (Note: See § Names below.) is a city in central Ukraine, situated along the Inhul River. It serves as the administrative center of Kirovohrad Oblast. As of 2022, the population of the city was estimated to be 219,676 (2022 estimate), making Kropyvnytskyi the 29th largest city in Ukraine and the largest city in the oblast.

Kropyvnytskyi traces its history back to 1764, when the Russian government constructed the Fortress of St. Elizabeth to protect the frontier regions. Settlements grew around the fortress, which eventually came to be known as the city of Yelysavethrad. For a brief period, the fortress served as the capital of the Novorossiya Governorate, but after it was demoted back down, it lost military importance, while the importance of the city grew sharply as a regional trade centre. It was also known thanks to the Theatre of Coryphaei, which is considered the birth of Ukrainian professional theatre. After the October Revolution, it was claimed by the Soviet Union after a change of hands in 1920, and the city was eventually renamed Kirovohrad. Kirovohrad became the administrative centre of the newly created Kirovohrad Oblast in 1939, but was shortly thereafter largely destroyed during World War II. During the war, over 5,000 Jews were killed in the city as part of the Holocaust until Kirovohrad was liberated as part of the Kirovograd offensive. After the collapse of the Soviet Union, the city became part of a newly independent Ukraine and was renamed to Kropyvnytskyi in 2016.

Kropyvnytskyi is the main industrial centre of the oblast, especially in agricultural machinery manufacturing and food processing. Some of its largest enterprises are Elvorti, Hydrosila, and Radiy. Cultural landmarks include the ruins of the Fortress of St. Elizabeth, the Arboretum, the Theatre named after Marko Kropyvnytskyi, and the numerous architecturally important buildings in the city centre. The city has multiple museums, including the Regional Museum of Local Lore, Regional Art Museum, and the Oleksandr Osmiorkin Art Memorial Museum. The city is home to the association football team FC Zirka Kropyvnytskyi, which plays at Zirka Stadium, and the historically dominant baseball team Biotechkom-KNTU, which plays at Diamond Baseball Stadium. The city is also home to multiple institutions of higher education, most notably the Kirovohrad State Pedagogical University, Kirovohrad National Technical University, and the State Flight Academy of Ukraine.

== Names ==
=== Current name ===
- Ukrainian: Кропивницький, romanized: Kropyvnytskyi IPA: [kropɪu̯ˈnɪtsʲkɪj]

=== Former names ===
- Yelysavet (Ukrainian: Єлисавет, Russian: Елисавета) 1754-1784 (Note: The settlement did not technically have a name during this period, as the name of Yelysavethrad for the settlement was only codified in 1784, but Yelysavet or Yelysavet town is how the settlement was commonly referred to in documents from the foundation of the Fortress of St. Elizabeth to the designation of the settlement as being a city.)
- Yelysavethrad (also spelled Yelisavetgrad, or commonly rendered as Elisavetgrad or Elizabethgrad in English language publications; Ukrainian: Єлисаветград, IPA: [jelɪsɑwɛtˈɦrɑd]; Russian: Елисаветград, romanized: Yelisavetgrad; Yiddish: יעליסאוועטגראד, romanized: Yelisavetgrad, IPA: [jəlɪsavətɡrad]) 1784-1924
- Zinovievsk (Ukrainian: Зінов'євськ, IPA: [zʲinɔu̯ˈjeu̯sʲk]; Russian: Зиновьевск) 1924-1934
- Kirovo (Ukrainian: Кірово, IPA: [ˈkirowɔ]; Russian: Кирово) 1934-1939
- Kirovohrad (also spelled Kirovograd; Ukrainian: Кіровоград, IPA: [kirowɔˈɦrɑd]; Russian: Кировоград, romanized: Kirovograd) 1939-2016

=== Name history ===
==== Yelysavet and Yelysavethrad ====
The foundation of the modern city of Kropyvnytskyi is dated to 18 June 1754 with the ceremonial laying of the first stone of the Fortress of St. Elizabeth. The first reference naming the fortress occurred during its establishment by the Imperial Russian government in decree No. 9921, in which the government ordered that "an earthen fortress be made, which is to be named the fortress of St. Elizabeth". The fortress itself was named for Elizabeth, a saint of Eastern Orthodox Christianity and the mother of John the Baptist, and also the patron saint of Elizabeth of Russia, the Russian monarch that established the fortress. Following the establishment of the fortress, thousands of workers were brought in, most of whom were Ukrainian Cossacks from the Myrhorod Regiment and Poltava Regiment, and settlers also came to the area around the fortress, including Old Believers, Serbs, Moldovans, Greeks, and Russians. These new settlements around the fortress were not formally assigned a name, although in practice the informal name of Yelysavet, or transliterated as Elizabeth in English, came to be in popular use to describe them during the first few decades. Yelysavet was evidently derived from the name of the fortress, a practice common in Cossack naming, as they frequently named settlements in relation to the area. The use of Yelysavet is evidenced to by multiple documents, one of the earliest of which is a French map from 1754 by Robert de Vaugondy, who just lists the settlement as "Єлисавет Город", or Yelysavet town. A year later, on 25 April 1755, Maksym Taran of the Zaporozhian Sich wrote "....єдучи чрез Гардъ до города Елисавету с трома бутами виномъ", thus referring to the town as Елисавету, or Yelysavet(a). The name Yelysavethrad or Yelysavethrad (also sometimes rendered Yelysavetohrad early on) only came into use following the establishment of the Yelysavegrad province of the Novorossiysk Governorate on 22 March 1764. Similar to Yelysavet, Yelysavegrad was derived from the fortress name, but with the addition of "-grad" (Old/Church Slavonic "градъ"; Russian "град"). (Note: Some monarchists and later Bolsheviks claimed that Yelysavethrad was a derivation of the name of Elizabeth of Russia after her recent death, although this is a misreading and not true.) The early form of Yelysavetohrad was only used for a short time, as the addition of the "o" came from the Russian convention during this time of having vowels bridging the root name and the suffix, although the locals preferred simply modifying the already existing Yelysavet. In 1784, when Yelysavethrad was designated a city, the name was again confirmed officially. Another common variant of the name Yelysavethrad was Yelzavethrad, which had a з form, and was confirmed in use prior to 1934 alongside the more common variant by the Ukrainian Soviet Encyclopedia.

==== Zinovievsk, Kirovo, and Kirovohrad ====
During the brief period of Ukrainian rule during the Ukrainian War of Independence, the UPR preferred to shift away from the imperial Yelysavethrad and towards Yelysavet, which was viewed as more Ukrainian since it was associated with the Cossacks. During the UPR period, the Mala Rada passed the renaming following efforts by Ukrainian activists. The Bolsheviks, after winning the war and taking the city, also eventually abandoned the imperial name of Yelysavethrad in 1924 for the name Zinovievsk by official decree. The name commemorated Grigory Zinoviev, a native of the city and an Old Bolshevik. Other proposed names prior to the passing of Zinovievsk included Leninsk (in honour of Vladimir Lenin; proposed by Chervona Zirka) and Trotsk (in honour of Leon Trotsky, who was also native to nearby Bobrynets). The name Zinovievsk was approved by the local authorities on 12 July 1924, and officially confirmed by the All-Ukrainian Central Executive Committee (VUTsVK) a few months later on 7 August 1924, and finally at an executive level on 5 September 1924. As Zinoviev slowly fell out of favour after siding with Trotsky against Joseph Stalin, in 1928, there were some early efforts to rename Zinovievsk to Dzerzhynsk, although these did not pass. It was not until 1934 that the name was changed, when Sergei Kirov, another high-ranking Bolshevik in Leningrad, was assassinated, for which Zinoviev was accused of complicity and then executed after a show trial. Thus, the name of the city was quickly changed on 27 December 1934 to Kirovo or Kirove, which was ratified by January 1935. Kirovo honoured Sergei Kirov, who had many new things named after him in the city, while the name of Zinovievsk was quickly wiped out and suppressed. The name Kirovo was eventually changed in early 1939 to Kirovohrad or Kirovograd alongside the establishment of Kirovohrad Oblast. This was done in order to differentiate the city from the larger city of Kirov within the Russian SFSR.

==== Renaming efforts, switch to Kropyvnytskyi ====
During the German occupation of the city in 1941, some Ukrainian nationalists, supported by the newspaper Ukrainian Voice, attempted to get the city renamed to Tobilevychi in honour of the Tobilevych family, a theatre family native to the area. The Germans, however, rejected this and kept Kirovohrad/Kirowograd for unknown reasons. After Ukrainian independence, the renaming of Kirovohrad became an immediate topic within the city council as early as 1992, but renaming efforts were largely blocked by opponents who argued the timing was "not right". Most of these early renaming efforts were to restore Yelysavethrad, supported by deputy Volodymyr Panchenko and Leonid Kutsenko. The also historical Yelysavet was also floated around by the city's newspapers, and supported by mayor Vasyl Mukhin for some time. Over time, renaming efforts splintered as Yelysavethrad was continuously rejected as Russified due to its imperial use, while alternatives emerged. (Note: Early Ukrainian-language alternatives proposed included Inhulsk, Zlatopil, Stepohrad, Skifopil, and Novokozachyn. Inhulsk derives from the nearby Inhul, Zlatopil comes from either the wheat fields or gold ore deposits, and Skifopil means "Scythia-city" and was proposed by a historian who claimed the city of "Scythopolis" was the ancient Scythian centre of Exampaois, which was theorised by some to be near to Kirovohrad. The last, Novokozachyn, was based on the theory that it was the city's original historical name and a supposed Cossack winter encampment based on a reference volume, although others have argued that this is a misreading of the work and that it had never described the city.) On 16 April 2000, a referendum was held in the city asking three questions: whether they supported renaming Kirovohrad, if they wished to restore Yelysavethrad, or in general if they wished to rename the city anything. In the survey, nearly 71% voted to retain Kirovohrad, 35% said they would support renaming, and 33% supported Yelysavethrad. Four years later, to coincide with the 250th anniversary of the city, renaming efforts were again pushed, although again nothingn happened. Eventually, in October 2008, the city council seriously attempted a renaming referendum, but an online poll conducted had 65% of the population opposing a renaming. Further attempts were made to restore Yelysavethrad primarily over the years by Our Ukraine in 2010 and then from 2011-2013 by the Party of Regions, UOC-MP, and Serhiy Larin.

Following Euromaidan, the President of Ukraine, Petro Poroshenko, signed a bill as part of decommunization in Ukraine on 15 May 2015, which required places associated with the communist past to be renamed within a six-month period. Due to this, in August 2015, following public hearing seven names were shortlisted for renaming efforts: Yelysavethrad, Inhulsk, Zlatopil, Kropyvnytskyi, Kozatskyi, Blahomyr, and Eksampei. Rather than holding a legally binding referendum like in 2000, a non-binding "public opinion poll" was held on 25 October 2015 (alongside the local elections) about renaming. The poll itself was highly controversial, with multiple journalists in investigations finding that people could vote multiple times without identification or providing residency in the city, with "Prosvita" head saying he was able to vote several times under different names. Exit polls showed a roughly equal share between Yelysavethrad, Inhulsk, and Zlatopil, although in the end the officially released count showed Yelysavethrad as the clear winner at 35,153 votes, followed by Inhulsk at 4,302 and Zlatopil at 3,509. Following the poll, a city council session was held, which, instead of just forwarding Yelysavethrad to the Verkhovna Rada for renaming, sent all seven to the Rada for the deputies there to choose the name. According to Verkhovna Rada speaker Andriy Parubiy, the Ukrainian Institute of National Remembrance recommended the name "Inhulsk" to the Rada, rejecting Yelysavethrad. After debates, an appeal for Kropyvnytskyi as a substitute was approved, and with 230 votes in favour, Kropyvnytskyi was chosen to replace Kirovohrad on 14 July 2016.

== History ==
=== Before the foundation ===
The area around Kropyvnytskyi was originally settled during the Middle Paleolithic, as evidenced by two flint tools that are likely Mousterian. Successive cultures then inhabited the area, mostly leaving behind kurgans. There have been some arguments that the area was then permanently settled by the Zaporozhian Cossacks as early as the second half of the 16th century, who mostly had winter settlements in the area. Some of the claimed Cossack-era settlements include the present-day neighbourhoods of Zavadivka, Lelekivka, Kovalivka, and Balka.

=== Founding of the fortress and city ===
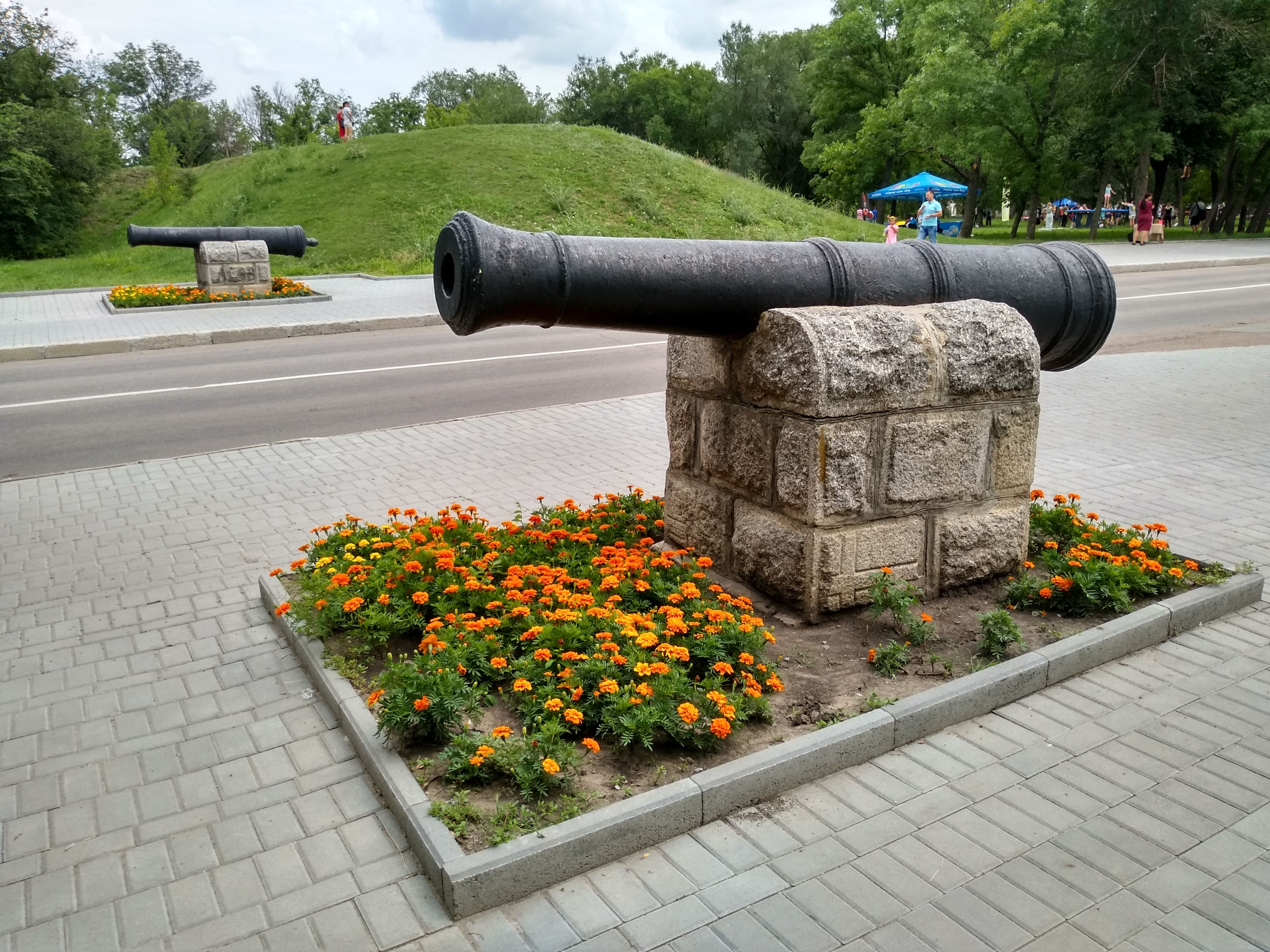
Walls of St. Elizabeth fortress

Elworthy Robert & Thomas, an agronomic machinery company, one of the largest enterprises in the city.

In order to protect the settlements of the newly created frontier region of New Serbia, in 1751, Jovan Horvat requested the Imperial Russian government to construct a fortress. This was eventually approved, with the fortress being specified to be named the Fortress of St. Elizabeth by decree No. 9921. The site chosen for the fortress was 200 sazhen from the right bank of the Inhul, and was in the middle of two other fortresses. After construction was approved, the ceremonial laying of the fortress began on 18 June 1754, which is considered the founding date of the city. In order to construct it, many Ukrainian Cossacks were brought in, with other settlers also coming, including Old Believers and Greeks. These settlers formed the early suburbs of Bykove and Permski around the fortress, although the settlement itself had no name up until this point. For a brief period upon the foundation of the Novorossiya Governorate, the fortress was designated as the capital of the governorate from March 1764 to March 1765. In light of the loss of its status as capital and with the liquidation of the Cossack Hetmanate, the military significance of the fortress fell sharply, although the settlement grew into a chartered county town and later city called Yelysavehtrad.

The city of Yelysavethrad rapidly grew into a regional trade centre of southern Ukraine, although it was placed under military-settlement administration from 1829 to 1861. In the course of this growth, the city saw swell in the amount of its Jewish population due to being located within the Pale of Settlement. It also became well-known culturally thanks to the foundation of the Theatre of Coryphaei within the city in 1882, which is considered the birth of Ukrainian professional theatre. The city also had many notable Ukrainian actors and playwrights come to the city during this time.

=== Early 20th century and Ukrainian War of Independence ===
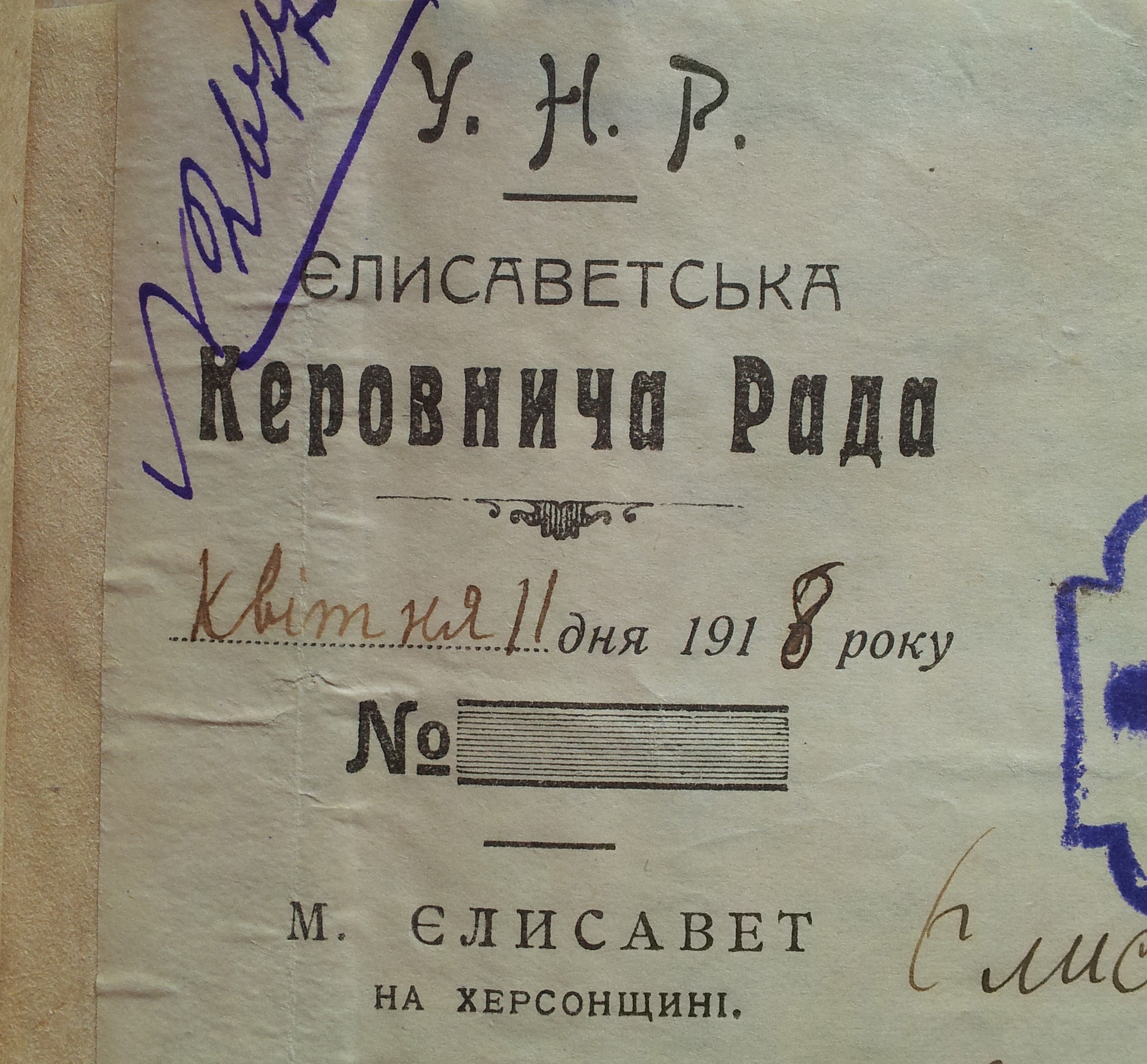
A letterhead from the governing council of the city when it was ruled by the UPR, April 1918.

By the early 1900s, the city's industrial side continued to grow rapidly, with 351 enterprises within the city. By far the largest enterprise was Elworthy Robert & Thomas, an agricultural machinery company founded in 1874 by immigrants from the United Kingdom. However, this growth halted due to the start of the Ukrainian War of Independence and the wider Russian Civil War. Initially, the city remained under the Russian Provisional Government, even following the October Revolution, since the Bolsheviks did not have much support. Ukrainian power was instead recognised by the city's duma in December of 1917. Bolshevik troops led by an anarchist Maria Nikiforova eventually seized the city, though, in late January 1918, and held the city until the signing of the Treaty of Brest-Litovsk, when they abandoned it. With the subsequent power vacuum, the "Provisional Committee of the Revolution" (VKR), a left-bloc alliance, took over the city briefly until the anarchists and Bolsheviks also returned for a little while.

The Germans and UPR seized the city from the Bolsheviks on 22 March 1918, although the Ukrainian State took over as the de jure power for some time until the Anti-Hetman Uprising. The UPR held power in the city until February 1919, when the Soviet invasion of Ukraine forced them to evacuate the city under Bolshevik pressure. In May, the Hryhoriv Uprising happened, which saw brief guerrilla control of the city. The most notable thing to happen during the uprising was a pogrom that killed 1,300 to 3,000 Jews before the Bolsheviks retook the city after some fighting. The city saw one more change of power after this to the White movement in August, before the Whites finally fell to the Bolsheviks and insurgents from the UPR in early January 1920.

=== Soviet rule ===
German soldiers in Central Square during the occupation.

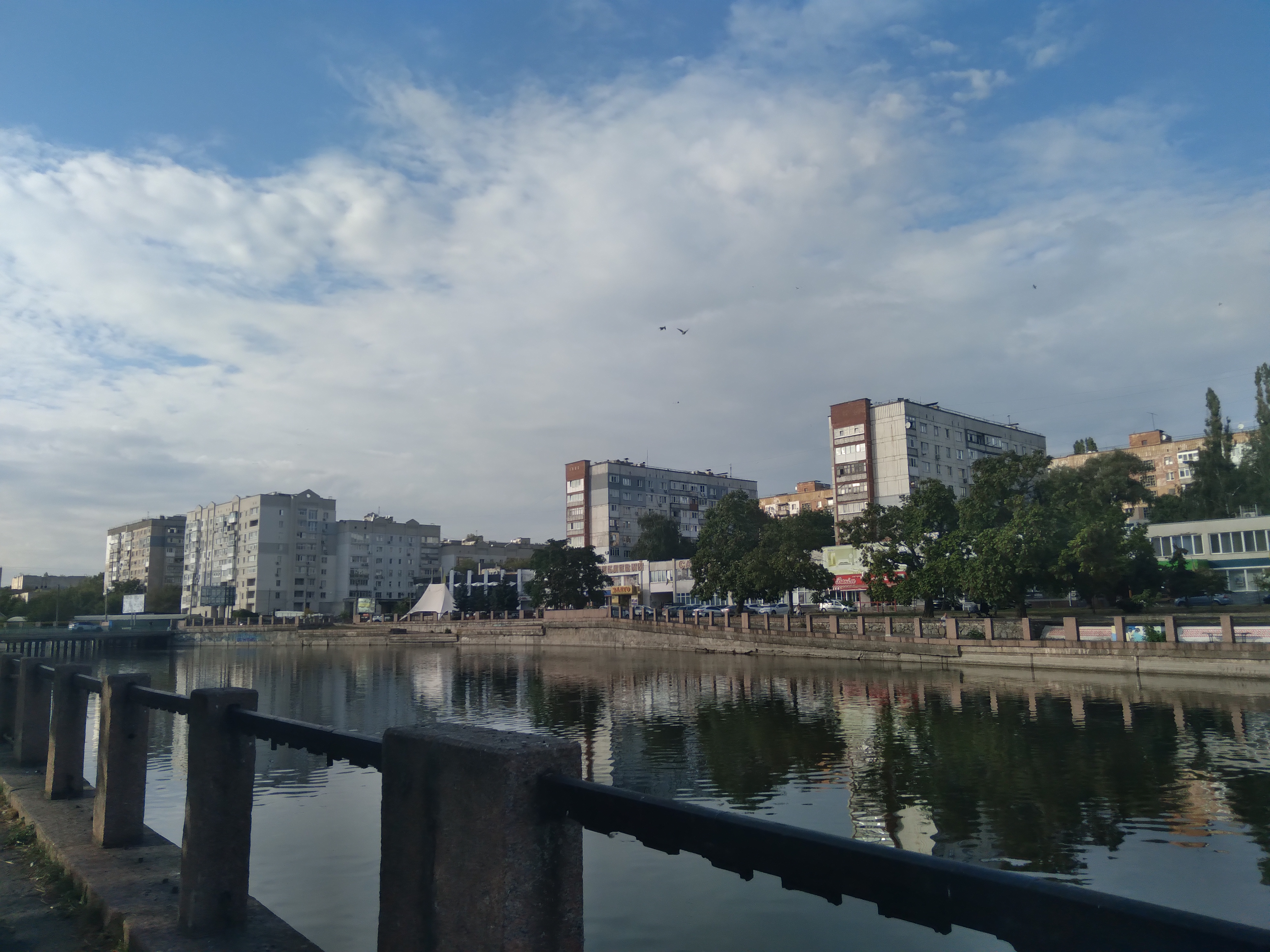
Soviet-era apartment blocks

During the subsequent interwar period, the city saw some instability, being struck by the 1921-1923 famine in Ukraine and the Holodomor, with the latter killing 2,238 residents of the city. Yelysavethrad also saw numerous administrative changes until it was finally made the administrative centre of the newly created Kirovohrad Oblast in 1939. The traditional name of the city was also changed from Yelysavethrad during this by the Soviets to Zinovievsk in 1924, Kirovo in 1934, and finally Kirovohrad in 1939 with the creation of the aforementioned oblast. Eventually, the city was again occupied during World War II following the start of Operation Barbarossa after brief fighting between the 14th Panzer Division and the 223rd Rifle Division on 5 August 1941. The city then became subordinated to Nikolajew Generalbezirk within Reichskommissariat Ukraine as Kirowograd. Under the Germans, the city saw a brief revival of Ukrainian nationalism thanks to the newspaper Ukrainian Voice and the formation of wings of the Organisation of Ukrainian Nationalists, although this was quickly suppressed. Kirovohrad, like many other cities, also had a Soviet partisan underground, although many groups were betrayed and led to mass executions. The Jewish population was also massacred as part of the Holocaust by the Germans, with over 5,000 Jews being killed in the city alone. Kirovohrad was eventually liberated as part of the Kirovograd offensive under the 2nd Ukrainian Front on 5 January 1944. After the war, the city was reconstructed, with the city keeping its pre-war architecture of low-rise buildings with extensive greenery. However, the city was also increasingly Russified under official Soviet policy.

=== In an independent Ukraine ===
After the collapse of the Soviet Union, the city of Kirovohrad became part of an independent Ukraine. Many businesses were privatised afterwards, and there were also some early attempts to change the name from the Soviet name of Kirovohrad, although these did not pass initially. Kirovohrad also became known during this time within Ukraine due to its political crises, with widespread accusations of electoral fraud in the 2002 and 2006 mayoral elections in the city, as well as in the city's electoral district during the Ukrainian presidential election of 2004. Decommunisation in the city was eventually accelerated in the city following Euromaidan protests, which began in Kirovohrad in November 2013 and drew around 1,000 to 3,000 residents initially, with protests becoming more widespread post January 2014. More than a thousand protested in the city square, although the oblast administration building was not taken. Following Euromaidan, Kirov Square was renamed to Heroes of Maidan Square, the monument to Sergei Kirov was removed, and the renaming of Kirovohrad became a priority alongside Dnipropetrovsk. Seven options were given, although in July 2016 the Verkhovna Rada decided on Kropyvnytskyi, which honours Marko Kropyvnytskyi, a native of the city and a known writer and playwright.

==== Russian invasion of Ukraine ====
Aftermath of a Russian drone attack on the men's gymnasium, 2025.

With the beginning of Russia's large-scale invasion of Ukraine in 2022, the city began to suffer from rocket attacks by the Russian army. On the morning of 1 March 2022, the Russians fired at the Kanatove airfield near Kropyvnytskyi, trying to destroy infrastructure facilities. On 12 March 2022, Russian troops attacked the airfield near the Kanatove railway station, as a result of which 7 soldiers were killed. On the morning of 23 July 2022, 13 missiles arrived (8 Kalibr sea-based missiles and 5 Kh-22 missiles from the TU-22M3 aircraft). The Russians fired at a military airfield and a railway facility. As the result, 19 were wounded and 3 were killed. Air alarms sounded almost daily in the city

As of 24 May 2022, there were more than 40,000 forcibly displaced people from regions of active hostilities in the city and region. According to data on 29 August 2022, this figure increased to 85,000 people. Also, during the war, various institutions and enterprises moved to Kropyvnytskyi, including Donetsk State University of Internal Affairs from Mariupol (originally Donetsk), Kharkiv Research Institute of Prosthetics, Donetsk National Medical University from Kramatorsk (originally Donetsk) and Kherson State Agrarian and Economical University

== Geography ==
Green pine massif

Cossack Island on the banks of the Inhul

The city is in the center of Ukraine and within the Dnieper Upland. The Inhul river flows through Kropyvnytskyi. Within the city, several other smaller rivers and brooks runs in the Inhul; they include the Suhoklia and the Biyanka. There are also two constructed reservoirs near the city: the Lelekivske Reservoir, which comes from the Hruzka river up north near Nove, and the Kirovohrad Reservoir itself, which is on the Inhul. The city is also part of the area known as the Ukrainian Shield, specifically within the Kirovohrad tectonic block. Lastly, Kropyvnytskyi has some deposits of minerals, mostly granite near the right bank of the Suhoklia, and also some deposits of brown coal, uranium, and sand.

The only object classified as being of local importance as a landscape reserve is the green pine tree massif in the area of Lisoparkova. It has been listed since 2009 alongside the general area of Lisoparkova Street, which was included as a nature reserve fund of local importance. There are also park monuments of landscape art the Arboretum, Cosmonauts Park, Kovalivsky, Cossack Island, and Victory Park. The Arboretum is a commercial recreation park of 44.2 hectares with many types of trees and shrubs, and is known especially for its spring tulip display. Cosmonauts Park is a small monument measuring 4.57 hectares that was founded in 1965, but has since been mostly abandoned. Kovalivsky was a park built originally in the 1850s and was, for some time during the Soviet era, known as Lenin Park, and consisted of 8.3 hectares. There are various species of trees and shrubs in the park, and it also has historical monuments. Cossack Island is located in the area of Vynnychenko Avenue near the bed of the Inhul, and was created in 1937 in honour of Alexander Pushkin. The artificial park has playgrounds, trees, and flowers. The last, Victory Park, is the most well-known and the oldest, having been originally established in 1764 as City Garden by order of Catherine II. It originally had a vineyard and fruit trees and a giant oak tree named after Potemkin. City Garden was rebuilt in the early 1800s to be in the "English style", with a central alley, a bathhouse, and flower beds and paths. The park was renamed in the 1970s to Victory Park in honour of the liberation of Kirovohrad, and now consists of 39.5 hectares. In 2019, extensive reconstruction began on the park after talks since 2004.

=== Climate ===
Kropyvnytskyi is in the central region of Ukraine. Kropyvnytskyi's climate is moderate continental: cold and snowy winters, and hot summers. The seasonal average temperatures are not too cold in winter, not too hot in summer: −4.8 °C (23.4 °F) in January, and 20.7 °C (69.3 °F) in July. The average precipitation is 534 mm (21 in) per year, with the most in June and July.

Climate data for Kropyvnytskyi, Ukraine (1991–2020, extremes 1948–present)
Month	Jan	Feb	Mar	Apr	May	Jun	Jul	Aug	Sep	Oct	Nov	Dec	Year
Record high °C (°F)	11.1 (52.0)	18.7 (65.7)	24.0 (75.2)	30.5 (86.9)	35.8 (96.4)	35.5 (95.9)	38.8 (101.8)	39.4 (102.9)	37.1 (98.8)	28.9 (84.0)	21.0 (69.8)	15.7 (60.3)	39.4 (102.9)
Mean daily maximum °C (°F)	−1.0 (30.2)	0.6 (33.1)	6.8 (44.2)	15.7 (60.3)	21.9 (71.4)	25.5 (77.9)	28.0 (82.4)	27.7 (81.9)	21.5 (70.7)	13.9 (57.0)	5.8 (42.4)	0.7 (33.3)	13.9 (57.0)
Daily mean °C (°F)	−3.6 (25.5)	−2.7 (27.1)	2.3 (36.1)	9.9 (49.8)	15.8 (60.4)	19.6 (67.3)	21.7 (71.1)	21.0 (69.8)	15.4 (59.7)	8.8 (47.8)	2.6 (36.7)	−1.8 (28.8)	9.1 (48.4)
Mean daily minimum °C (°F)	−6.2 (20.8)	−5.6 (21.9)	−1.6 (29.1)	4.3 (39.7)	9.7 (49.5)	13.7 (56.7)	15.4 (59.7)	14.5 (58.1)	9.6 (49.3)	4.5 (40.1)	−0.1 (31.8)	−4.2 (24.4)	4.5 (40.1)
Record low °C (°F)	−30.0 (−22.0)	−31.1 (−24.0)	−25.0 (−13.0)	−8.0 (17.6)	−2.8 (27.0)	2.2 (36.0)	6.4 (43.5)	3.0 (37.4)	−5.0 (23.0)	−10.0 (14.0)	−21.2 (−6.2)	−26.1 (−15.0)	−31.1 (−24.0)
Average precipitation mm (inches)	35 (1.4)	28 (1.1)	35 (1.4)	32 (1.3)	50 (2.0)	63 (2.5)	57 (2.2)	40 (1.6)	48 (1.9)	41 (1.6)	36 (1.4)	33 (1.3)	498 (19.6)
Average precipitation days (≥ 1.0 mm)	7.5	6.0	7.0	6.0	7.5	7.9	6.0	4.8	5.8	5.7	5.7	7.0	76.9
Average relative humidity (%)	86.0	82.8	75.8	63.3	62.6	65.5	64.8	61.3	67.8	77.3	86.2	88.0	73.5
Source 1: Pogoda.ru
Source 2: NOAA (precipitation and humidity 1991–2020)

== Legal status and politics ==
=== Legal status ===
City council building

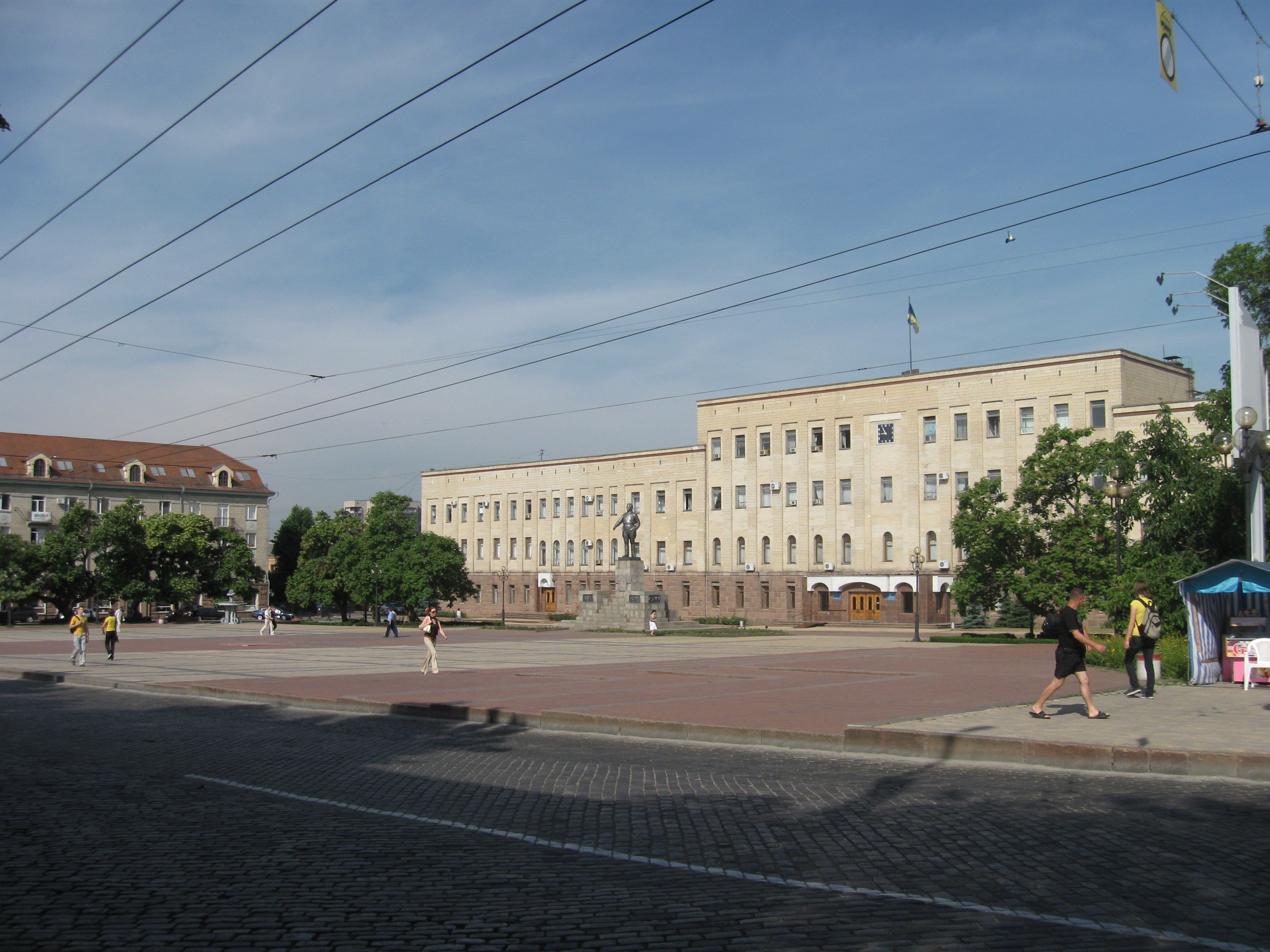
Oblast council building

The city's legislative branch is governed by the Kropyvnytskyi City Council. It currently consists of 42 deputies, who each serve 5-year terms. The city's executive branch is governed by the Executive Committee, which has 15 deputies. The head of the Executive Committee is the mayor of the city, and they are elected by direct public election in every four years. The city is also the seat of the oblast's local administration, the Kirovohrad Oblast Council, although the Governor of Kirovohrad Oblast is directly appointed by the President of Ukraine.

Kropyvnytskyi serves as the administrative center of Kropyvnytskyi Raion and hosts the administration of Kropyvnytskyi urban hromada, one of the hromadas of Ukraine. Until 18 July 2020, Kropyvnytskyi was designated as a city of oblast significance and belonged to Kropyvnytskyi Municipality but not to Kropyvnytskyi Raion even though it was the center of the raion. As part of the administrative reform of Ukraine, which reduced the number of raions of Kirovohrad Oblast to four, Kropyvnytskyi Municipality was merged into Kropyvnytskyi Raion.

==== Subdivisions ====
Kropyvnytskyi is divided into two districts — Fortechnyi and Podilskyi. The urban-type settlement of Nove is part of the Fortechnyi District. Both districts were established by decree in 1973 as Kirovskyi (after Sergei Kirov) and Leninskyi (after Vladimir Lenin). Kirovskyi covered the western part of the city and had roughly 113,000 residents and comprised 5,200 hectares at its foundation, being both the more populous of the two and having a higher industrial output. On 19 February 2016, by decree due to decommunisation, both districts were renamed: Kirovskyi to Fortechnyi and Leninskyi to Podilskyi.

=== Politics ===
After Ukrainian independence, the city's voters generally favoured a split between pro-European and pro-Russian parties, although this has shifted somewhat since Euromaidan. In the 2010 Ukrainian local elections, of the then 76 seats within the city council, 40 (52.6%) were won by the pro-Russian Party of Regions, 18 (23.7%) were won by the pro-European Batkivshchyna, and 7 were won by the pro-European Front for Change. The rest of the seats were evenly divided among a multitude of parties. After Euromaidan, during the 2015 Ukrainian local elections, the 42-seat council - after reduction - had 9 of its seats won by the pro-European Solidarity, 7 by the regionalist Our Land, 6 for Batkivshchyna, and 5 for the pro-Russian Opposition Bloc. The rest of the seats, again, were won by a multitude of parties. The city's mayoralty was held by Andriy Raykovych from 2015 to 2022, until he resigned early to become Governor of Kirovohrad Oblast. Raykovych initially ran for the pro-European Solidarity party in 2015, but then for Proposition in the 2020 elections. Proposition, which is described as the "Party of Mayors", is a regionalist party. Since 2022, due to no new elections being held because of martial law, the city's acting mayor has been the former deputy mayor Oleksandr Mosin.

Nationally, the city also comprises constituencies 99 and 100. Both were formed by the CEC on 28 April 2012. In the 2019 Ukrainian presidential election, constituency no. 99, in the first round of elections, voted decisively for pro-European candidates, with 36.85% voting for Volodymyr Zelenskyy, 15.04% for Yulia Tymoshenko, and 14.66% for former president Petro Poroshenko. Constituency no. 100 voted similarly, with 35.52% of the votes being cast for Zelenskyy, 19.71% for Tymoshenko, and 11.52% for Poroshenko.

== Demographics ==
=== Population ===
Historical population
Year	Pop.	±%
1897	61,488	—
1926	64,502	+4.9%
1939	100,392	+55.6%
1959	128,207	+27.7%
1970	188,795	+47.3%
1979	236,652	+25.3%
1989	269,803	+14.0%
2001	254,103	−5.8%
2011	235,490	−7.3%
2022	219,676	−6.7%

==== Ethnicity ====
Ethnic structure of the population according to population censuses:

	1897	1926	1939	1959	1989	2001
Ukrainians	23.6%	44.6%	72.0%	75.0%	76.9%	85.8%
Russians	34.6%	25.0%	10.9%	18.6%	19.5%	12.0%
Belarusians	0.1%	0.2%	0.4%	0.8%	0.8%	0.5%
Moldavians	0.03%	0.2%	0.7%	0.4%	0.5%	0.3%
Jews	37.8%	27.7%	14.6%	4.4%	1.9%	0.1%

=== Language ===
Distribution of the population by native language according to the 2001 census:

Language	Number	Percentage
Ukrainian	199,066	79.43%
Russian	49,907	19.91%
Other or undecided	1,656	0.66%
Total	250,629	100.00%

According to a survey conducted by the International Republican Institute in April–May 2023, 77% of the city's population spoke Ukrainian at home, and 20% spoke Russian.

== Cityscape ==
=== Urban layout ===
The urban layout of the city gradually developed around the Fortress of St. Elizabeth, which was situated on the right elevated bank of the Inhul. The earliest suburbs were Bykovo, which was north of the fortress; Persmki/e, which was east; and Podil, which was on the opposite left bank of the Inhul. Podil was the latest of the three and is where many of the city's main streets are today, as it was a place for merchants and housing instead of the military. The central square of the city evolved from the market there in Podil. Over time, the boundaries of the city gradually widened, and the city also incorporated the nearby village of Kovalivka. In 1845, a city plan was developed, which laid out Kirov Square, established Divetseva Street/Lenin Street as a connecting artery, and fixed the cavalry cadet school. During the rest of the 1800s, the city gradually expanded north, while industrial sites were moved to the city's western boundary near the Inhul. During the subsequent Soviet era, the Soviets largely retained the grid of the city, although they added large amounts of Khrushchevka like the areas of Novo-Mykolaivka and Novo-Nekrasivka (more than one million square metres of new housing, in fact). The first residential microdistrict built during this era was Cheremushky in the southwest, which was followed by more along Volkova Street. Since Ukrainian independence, the largest new housing has been a planned residential block in the southwest by Promyslovyi Avenue for internally displaced persons.

=== Architecture ===
The city's earliest architectural style was mainly a style of brick architecture, in which the facades of buildings largely consisted of exposed brick, with brick cornices also. It was widely used because it was cheap and there were local brick producers in the city. This style is seen throughout the city centre, like on Pashutinska Street, with a prominent example being the Holdenberg water-therapy clinic. This was followed by a local Empire style, which retained bricks but also had lighter colours seen in the regular Empire style. This is best seen in the officers' assembly building of the cavalry cadet school and the Kovalivska church. Other styles used during the 1800s were Neo-Byzantine architecture. After the Soviets took power, they produced the Constructivist architecture style in the city, which is seen at the power-station complex and housing complexes. After World War II, during rebuilding, Soviet Classicism was also applied to the city, such as the regional party-committee headquarters. Since Ukrainian independence, mostly informal Vernacular architecture has been seen due to privatisation.

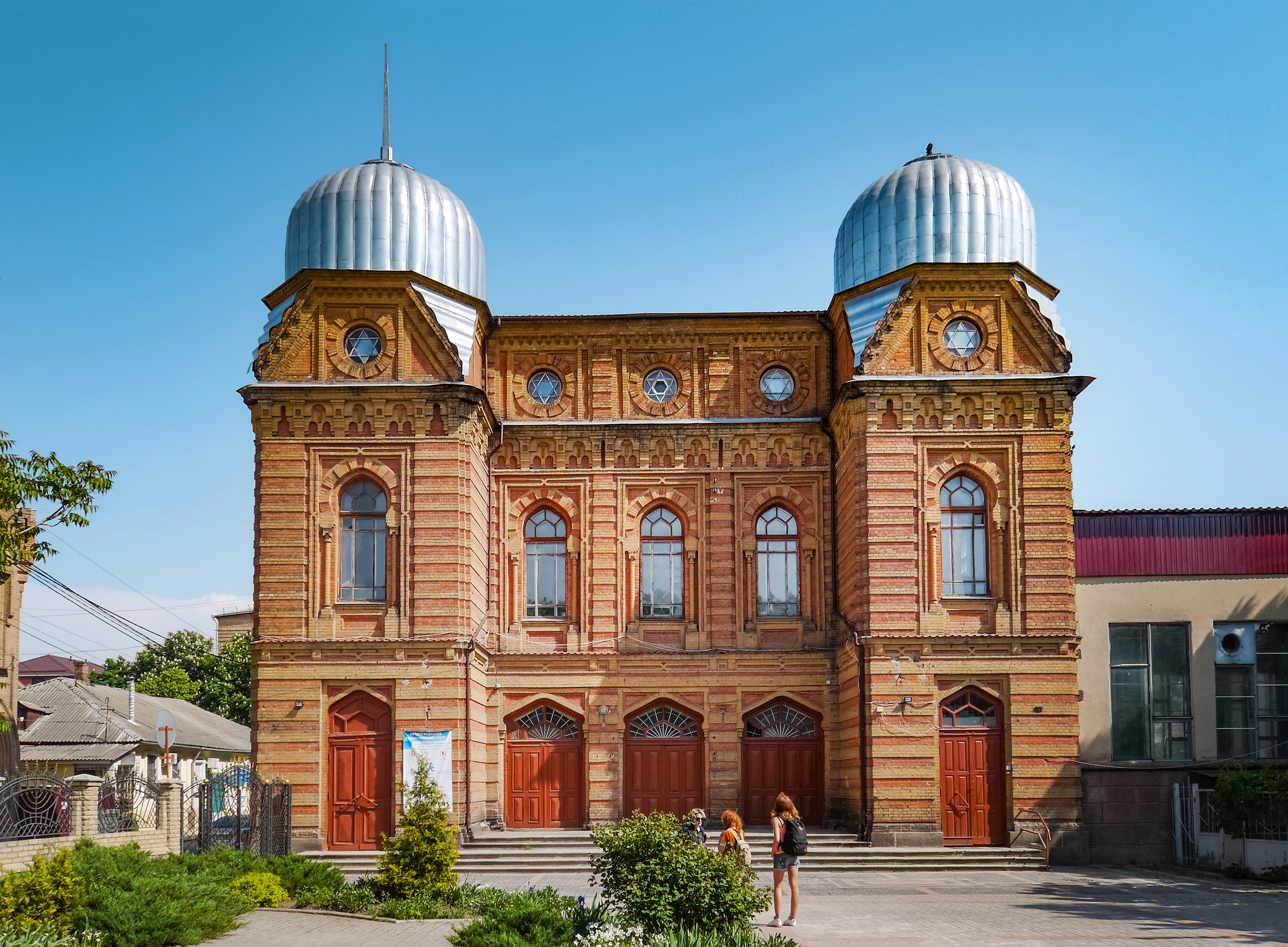
Great Choral Synagogue

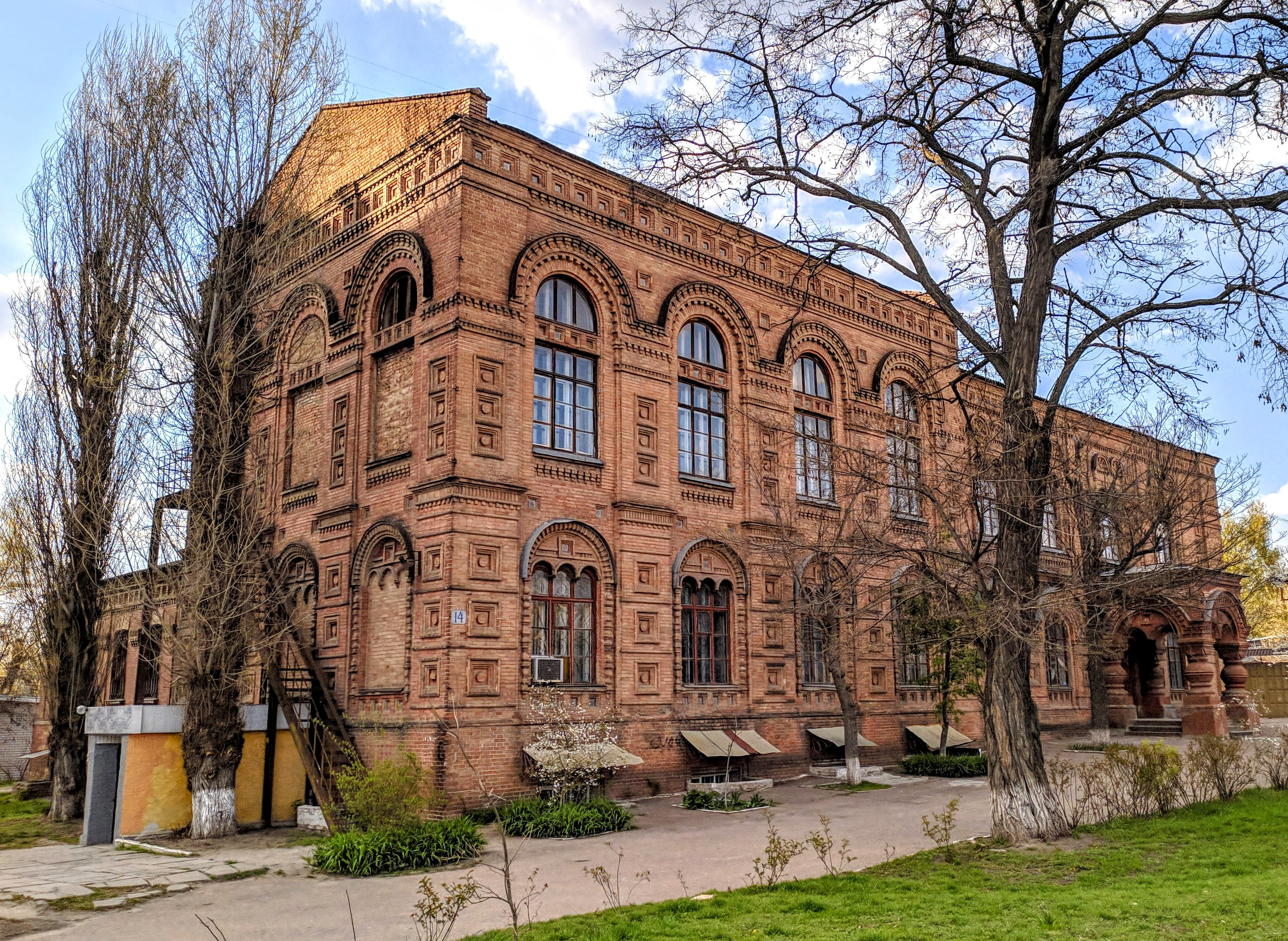
Craft school

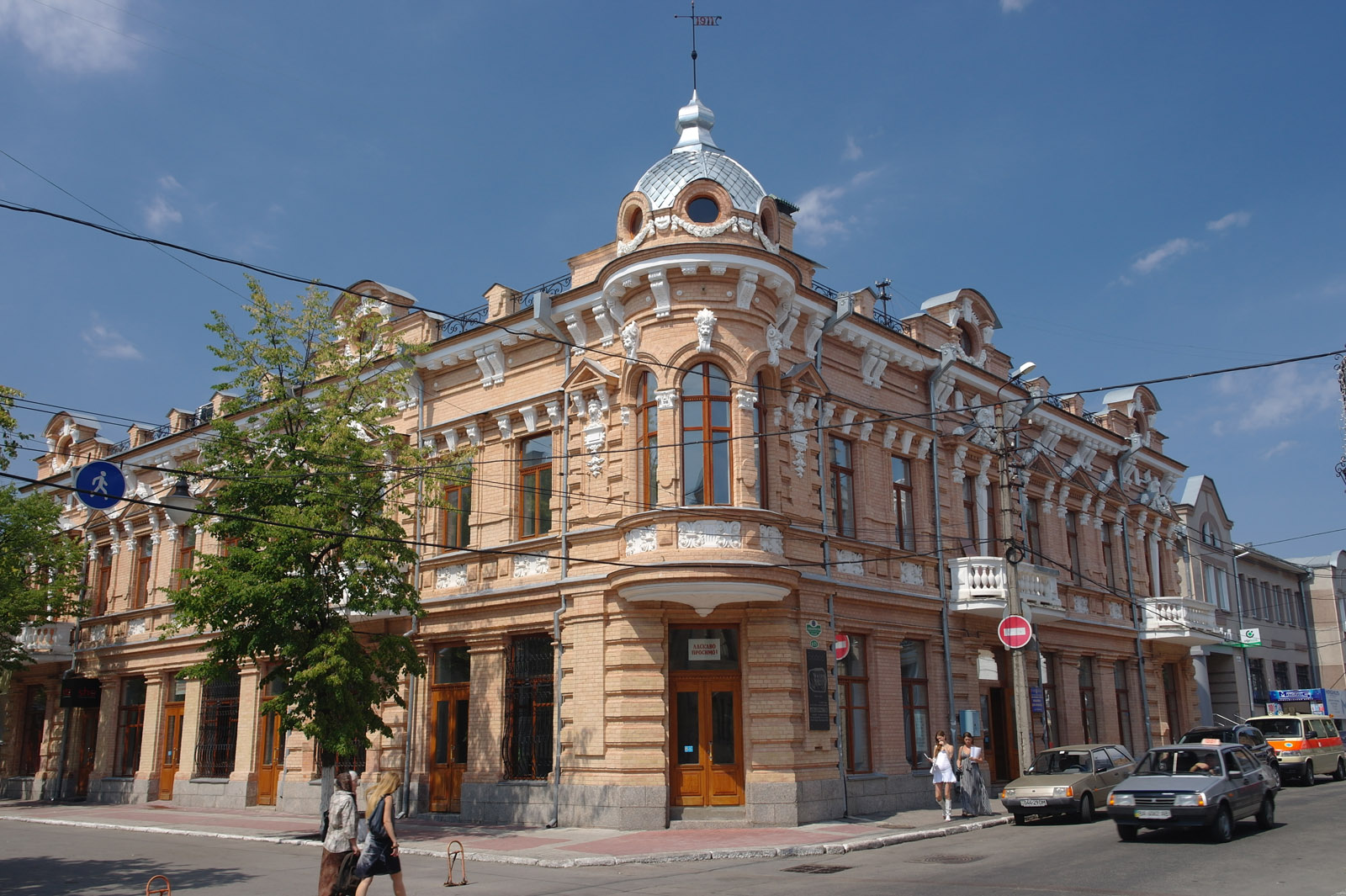
Mansion I.M. Marushchak

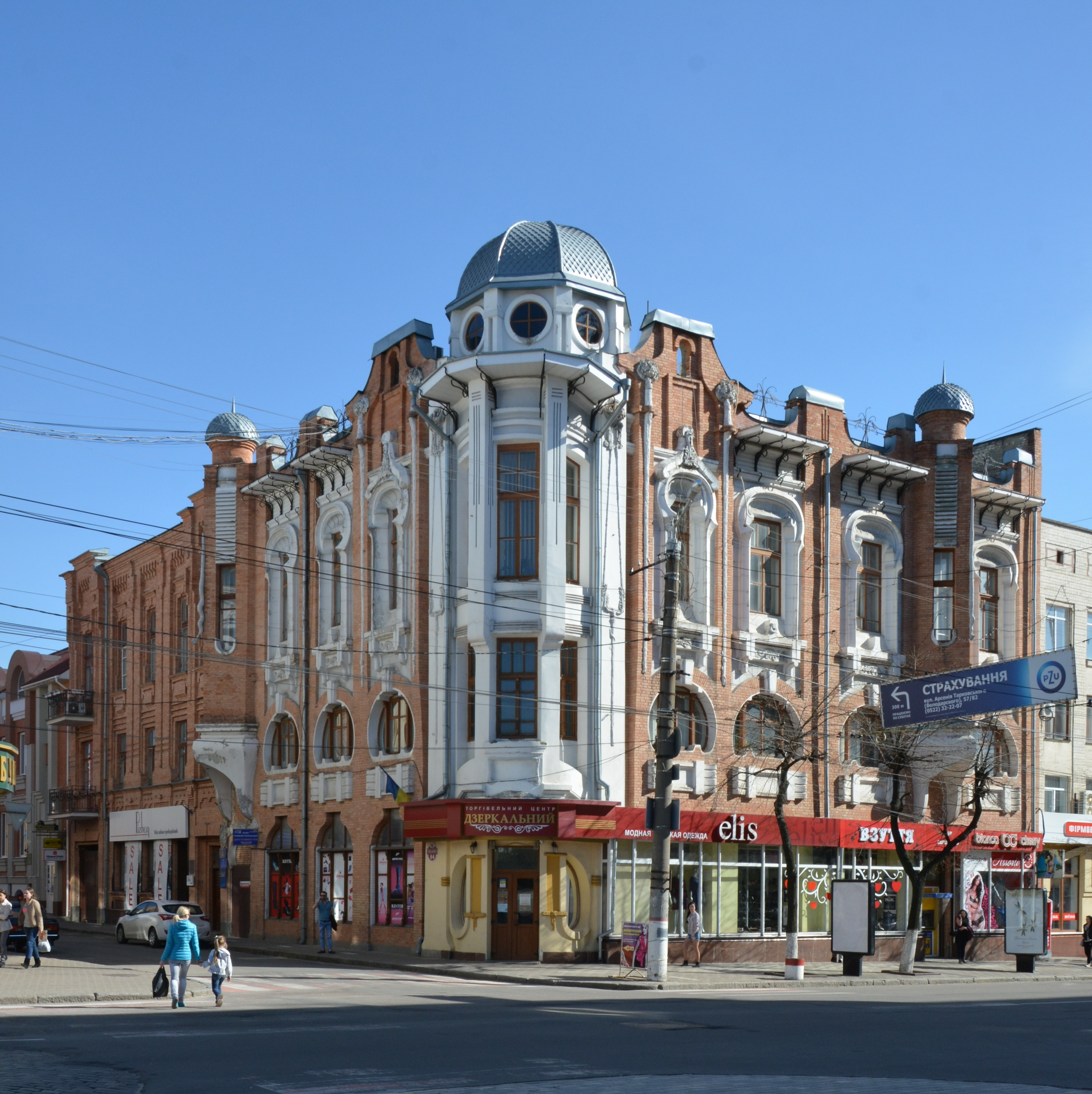
Early 20th century Art Nouveau architecture

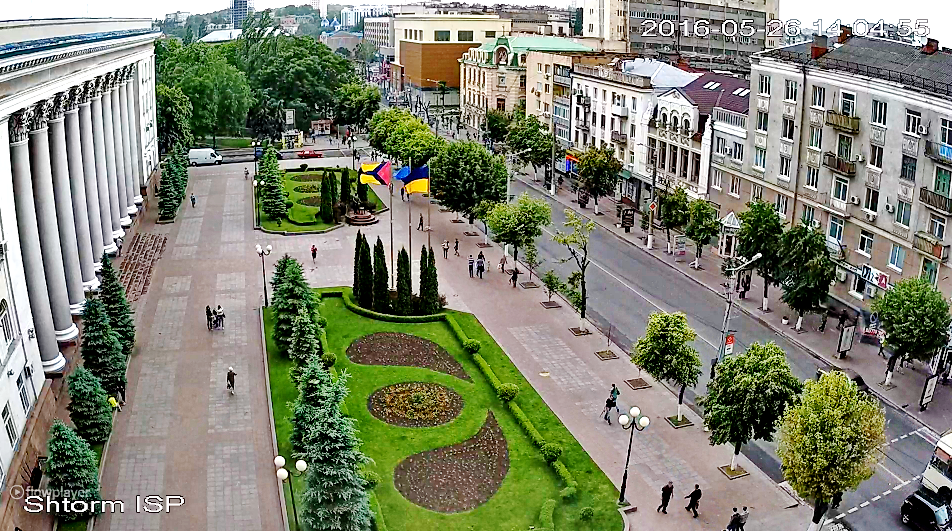
Square in front of the city council

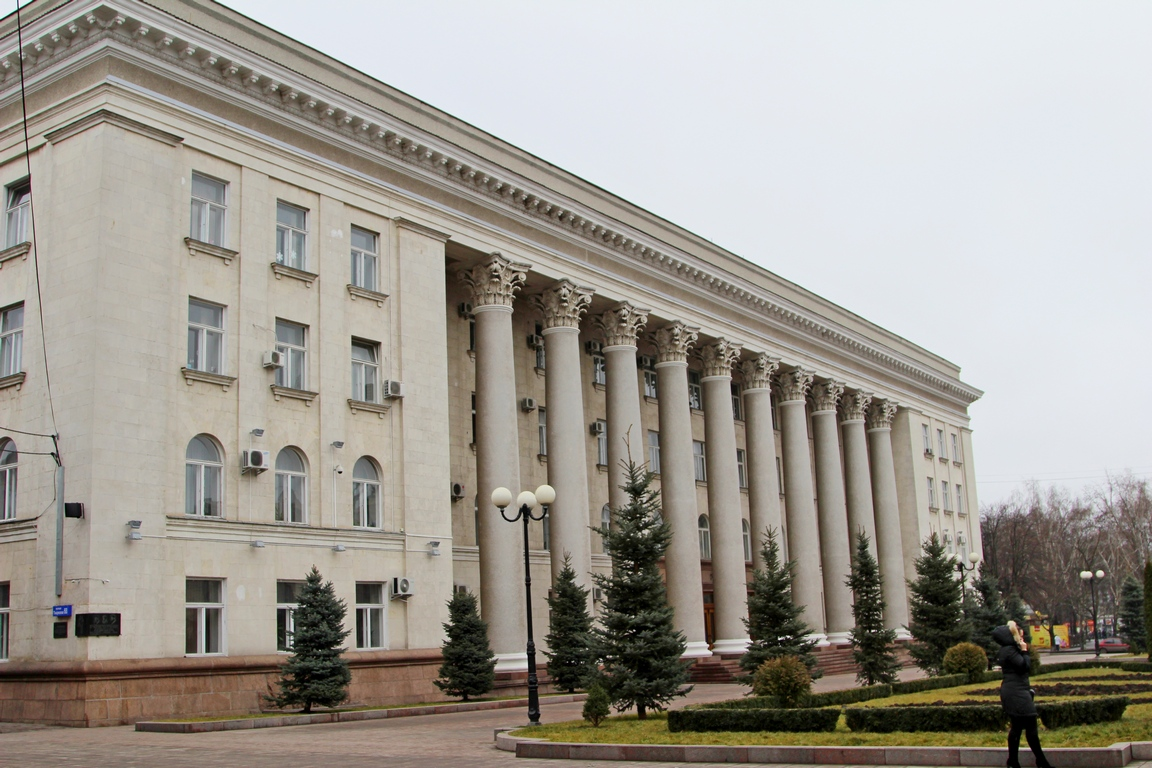
Kropyvnytskyi city council

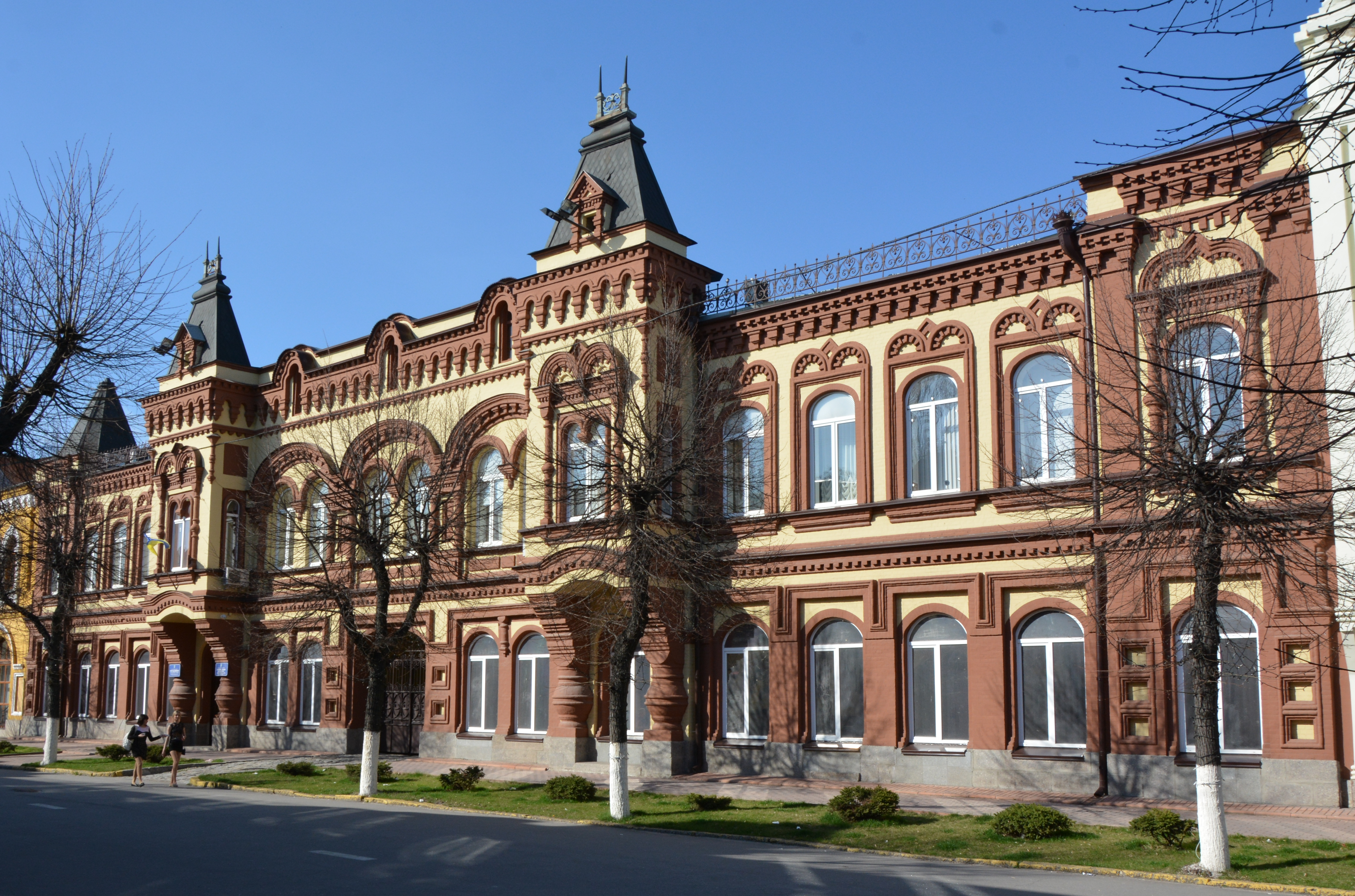
Security service building

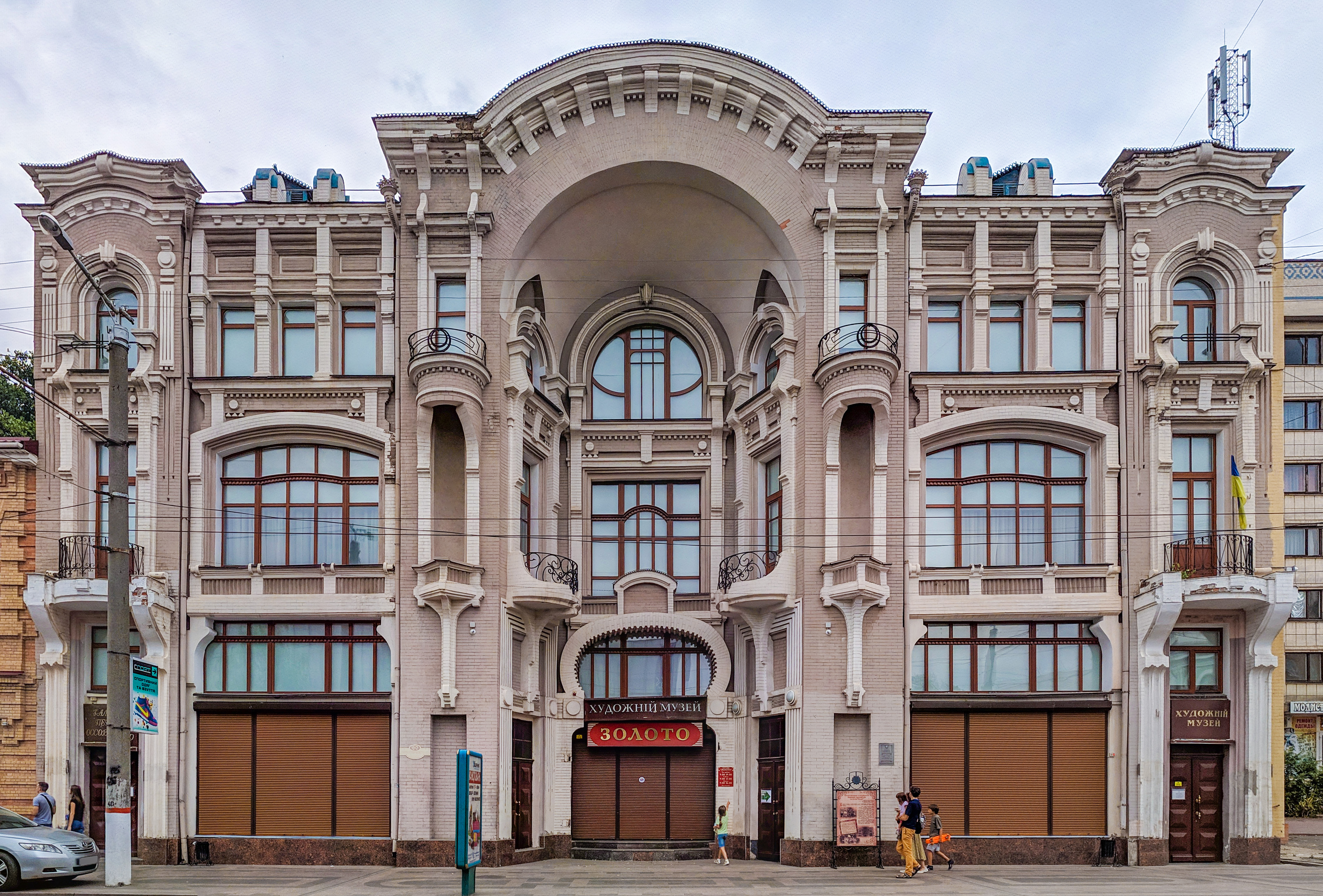
Art Museum

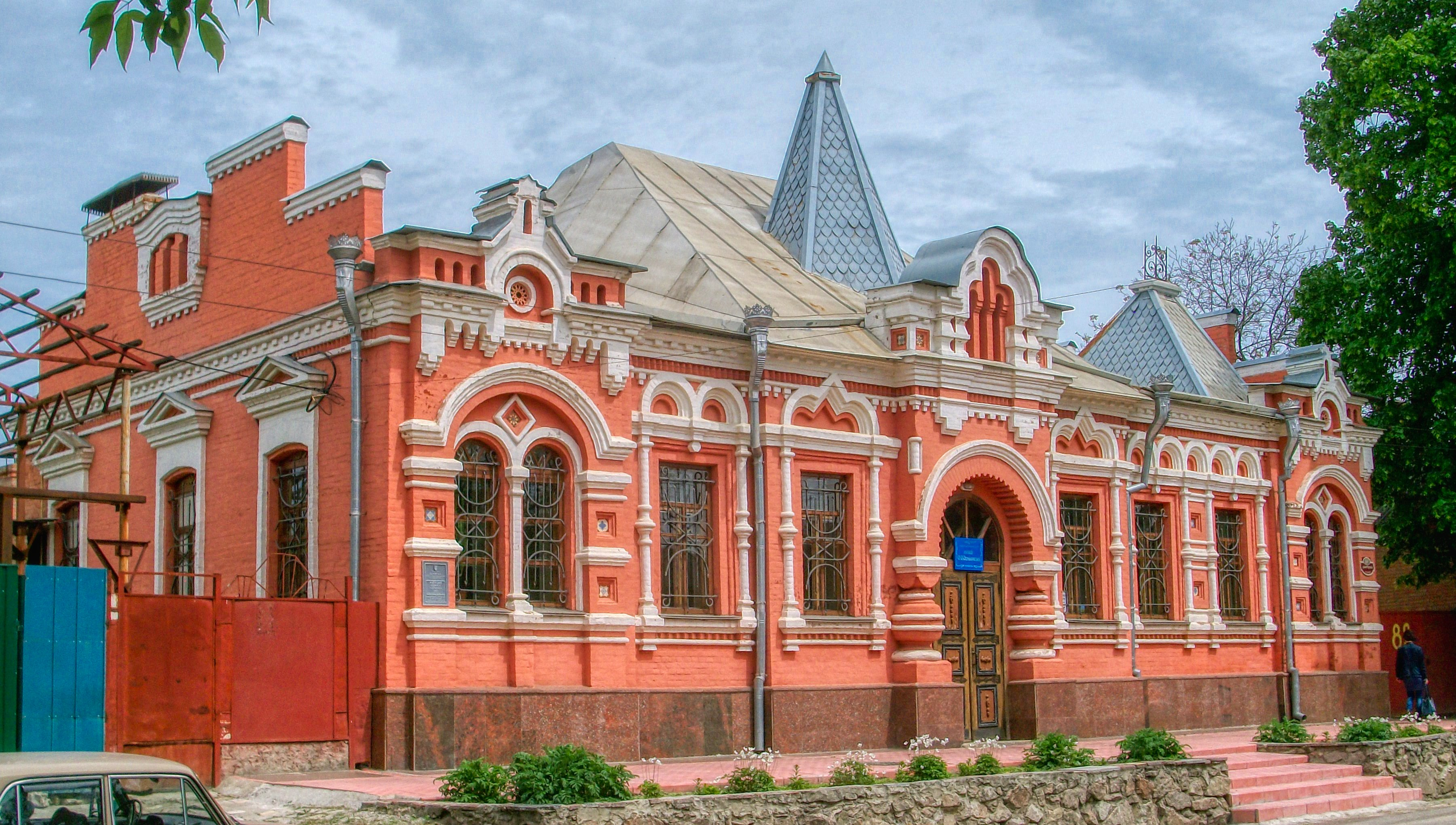
Osmyorkin museum

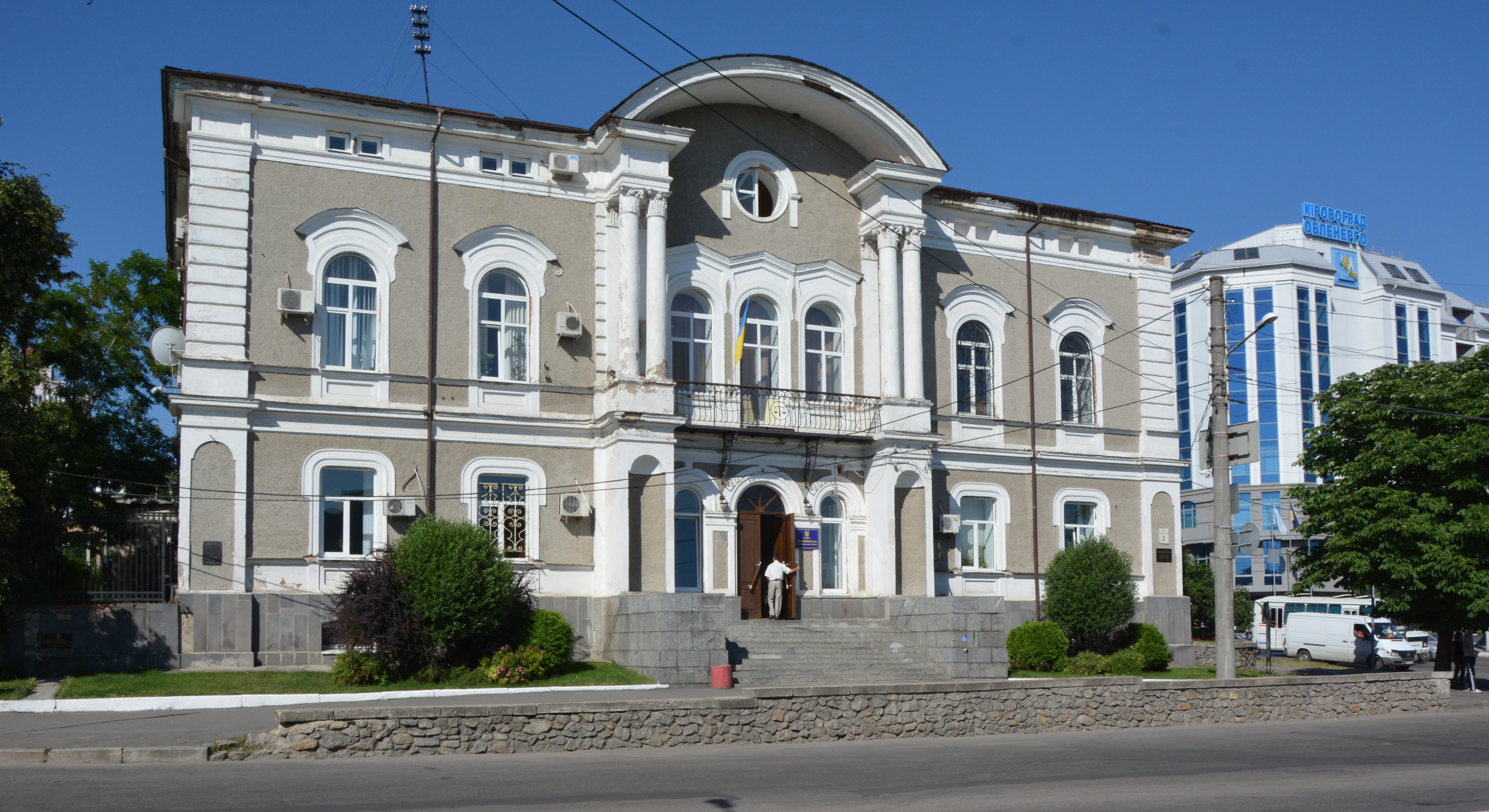
Old court building

== Media ==
=== Newspapers ===
The official newspaper of the city is Vechirnya Hazeta, which is the bulletin of the city's council. It was founded in 1990 as a weekly before becoming the city's bulletin of the city in 1998, and circulates roughly 13,300 copies a week. Hazeta covers the activities of the city council and the happenings of the community in Ukrainian. Another important newspaper is Ukraina-Tsentr (Ukraine-Center), which was founded in 1993 and was formerly published in Ukrainian and Russian, before having to mandatorily switch its print edition to Ukrainian in 2019. They retain both versions electronically. The last important newspaper is Kirovohrad Pravda, which is the oldest newspaper, as it was founded in 1874. It publishes twice a week in Ukrainian with a circulation of 16,000 copies, covering socio-political and economic problems.

=== Radio ===
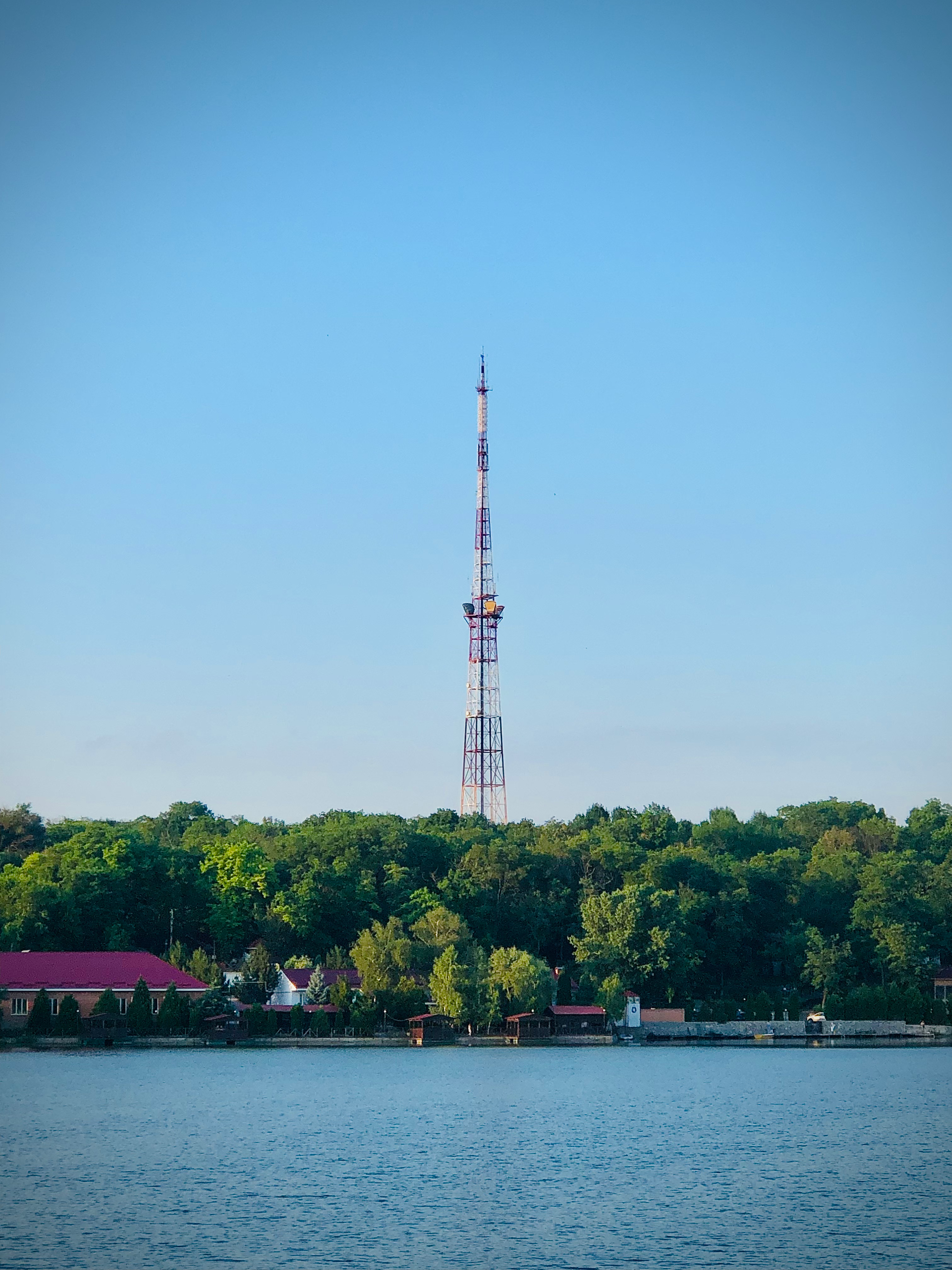
The city's TV tower.

Kropyvnytskyi has twenty-one radio stations on the FM band:

- Radio Promin (88.7 MHz), a radio station aimed at the youth. It has been airing in the city since 2020.
- Ukrainian Radio/Suspilne Kropyvnytskyi (91.2 MHz), the official nationwide radio program. Suspilne Kropyvnytskyi was formerly assigned to 106.7 MHz from 2002 to 2017, while Ukrainian Radio held this frequency starting in 2016. Starting in 2017, Suspilne Kropyvnytskyi shares the wave with Ukrainian Radio on select days.
- Radio Culture (91.8 MHz), the official nationwide program for culture and education. It has been airing in the city since 2020.
- Classic Radio (95.0 MHz), a music channel specialising in classical music. It was assigned this slot by competition in early 2026.
- Melody FM (98.9 MHz), a music station primarily for hits of the 1990s and 2000s. It started airing in the city in 2018.
- Army FM (99.3 MHz), an official station for broadcasting news about the military and music. It started broadcasting in 2023, replacing NRJ Ukraine.
- Radio Friday (100.0 MHz), an entertainment and music station playing both Ukrainian and foreign pop hits. It started broadcasting in the city in 2011, taking on the name "Radio Friday" only in 2023.
- Kraina FM (100.5 MHz), a music station dedicated to solely playing Ukrainian songs. It started broadcasting in the city in 2017.
- Radio Maximum (101.5 MHz), a music station that primarily plays techno music. It started broadcasting in 2025, replacing Retro FM.
- Radio ROKS (101.9 MHz), a music station that primarily plays rock music. It started broadcasting in 1997, but only started using its current format in 2011.
- Avtoradio (102.6 MHz), a music and information station that plays rock and pop music. It started broadcasting in 2003, but only started using its current format in 2023.
- Kiss FM (103.4 MHz), a music station that plays Eurodance. It started broadcasting in 2008, replacing "New Day".
- Radio Bayraktar (103.8 MHz), a music station that plays patriotic Ukrainian songs and war songs. It started broadcasting in 2022, replacing the now closed Russian Radio Ukraine.
- AB Radio/Radio Nostalgia (104.2 MHz), an entertainment station that hosts various programs in addition to "signature music" of the 1980s-90s. It started broadcasting in 1996, but only took on its current format in 2025.
- Radio NV (104.6 MHz), a news station. It started broadcasting in this format in 2018.
- Hit FM (105.3 MHz), a music station that plays hit pop songs. It started broadcasting in the city in 2006.
- Radio Relax (105.8 MHz), a music station aimed at playing soft compositions and relaxing music. It started broadcasting in 2003, but only took on its current format in 2017.
- Perets FM (106.2 MHz), a humour and entertainment station. It broadcasts "fun" programs and some music. It started broadcasting in 2009.
- Shlyager FM (106.7 MHz), a music station primarily playing chanson. It started broadcasting in 2010, but only took on its current format in 2024.
- Radio Lux FM (107.2 MHz), an entertainment and music station. It started broadcasting in 2006.
- Our Radio (107.9 MHz), a news and music station (music is only by Ukrainian performers). It started broadcasting in 2003.

=== Television ===
The main broadcaster in the city is Suspilne Kropyvnytskyi, which is the regional oblast channel of Suspilne. It was founded in 1960 at the Chervona Zirka factory in the city, and after a transmission tower was built at Sadova Street, a station was also built to broadcast across the oblast. The station became a branch of Suspilne only in 2017, and now broadcasts daily from 7:00 to 23:00. Other television channels through the first multiplex include ICTV, Inter, and Pershyi. The second has Novyi Kanal and 2+2, the third includes K1 and K2, while the fifth has both the local Suspilne Kropyvnytskyi and TTV.

== Religion ==
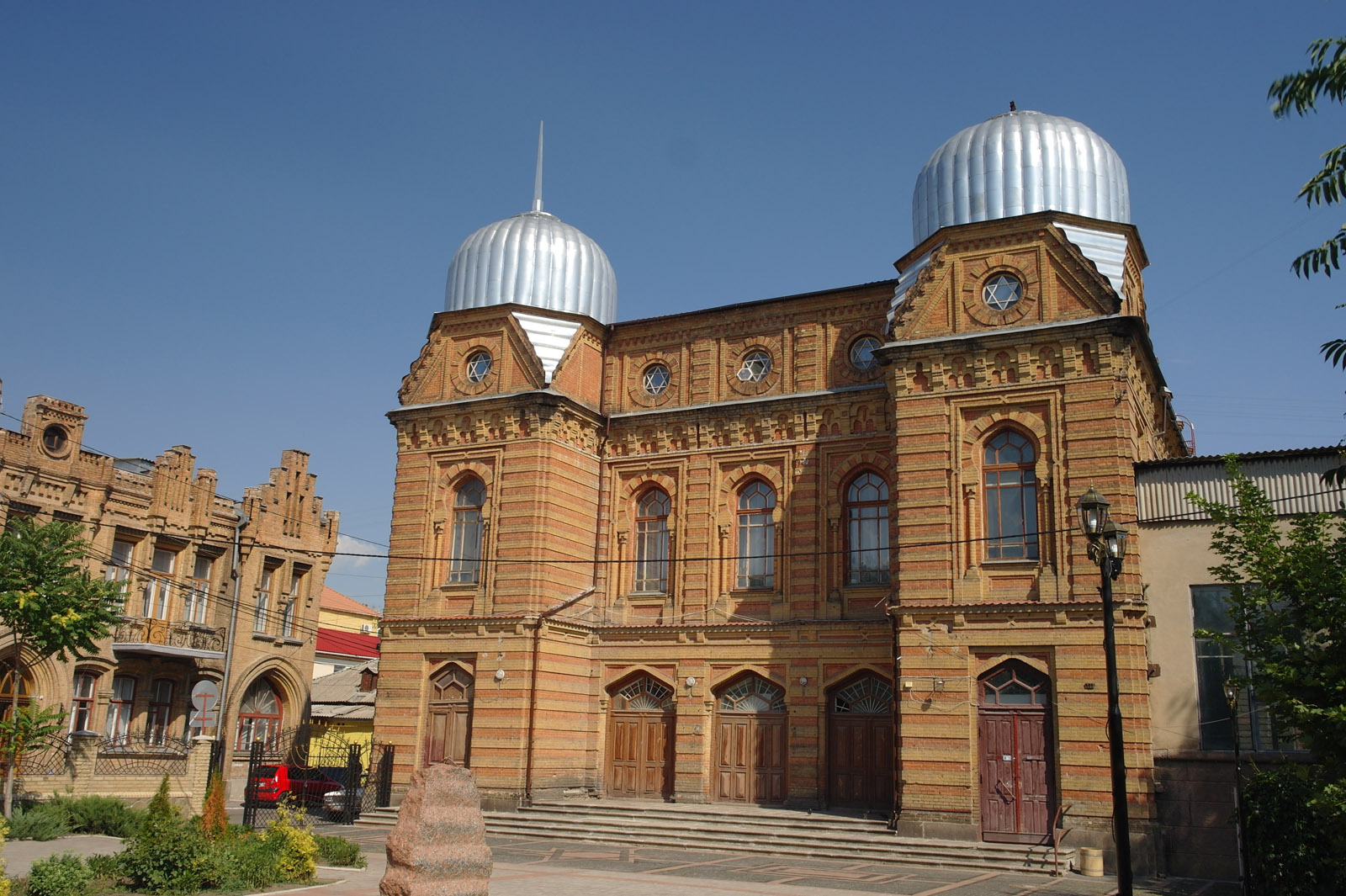
Great Choral Synagogue

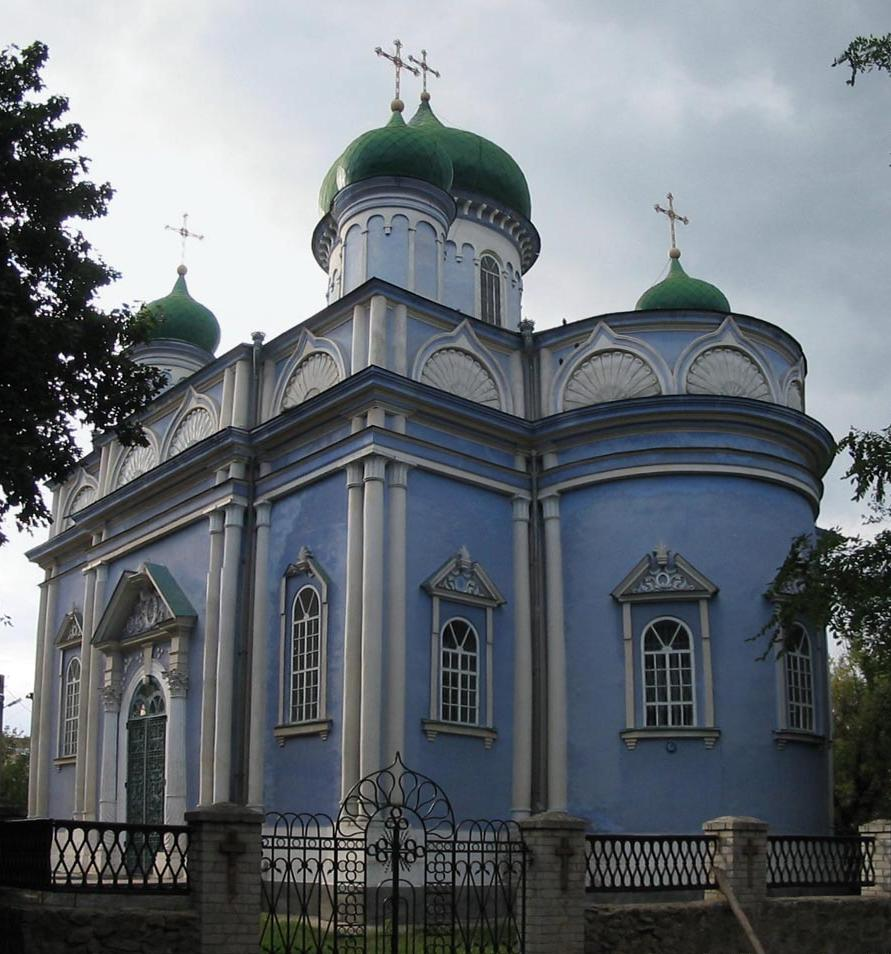
Intercession of the Theotokos church

Church of the Transfiguration

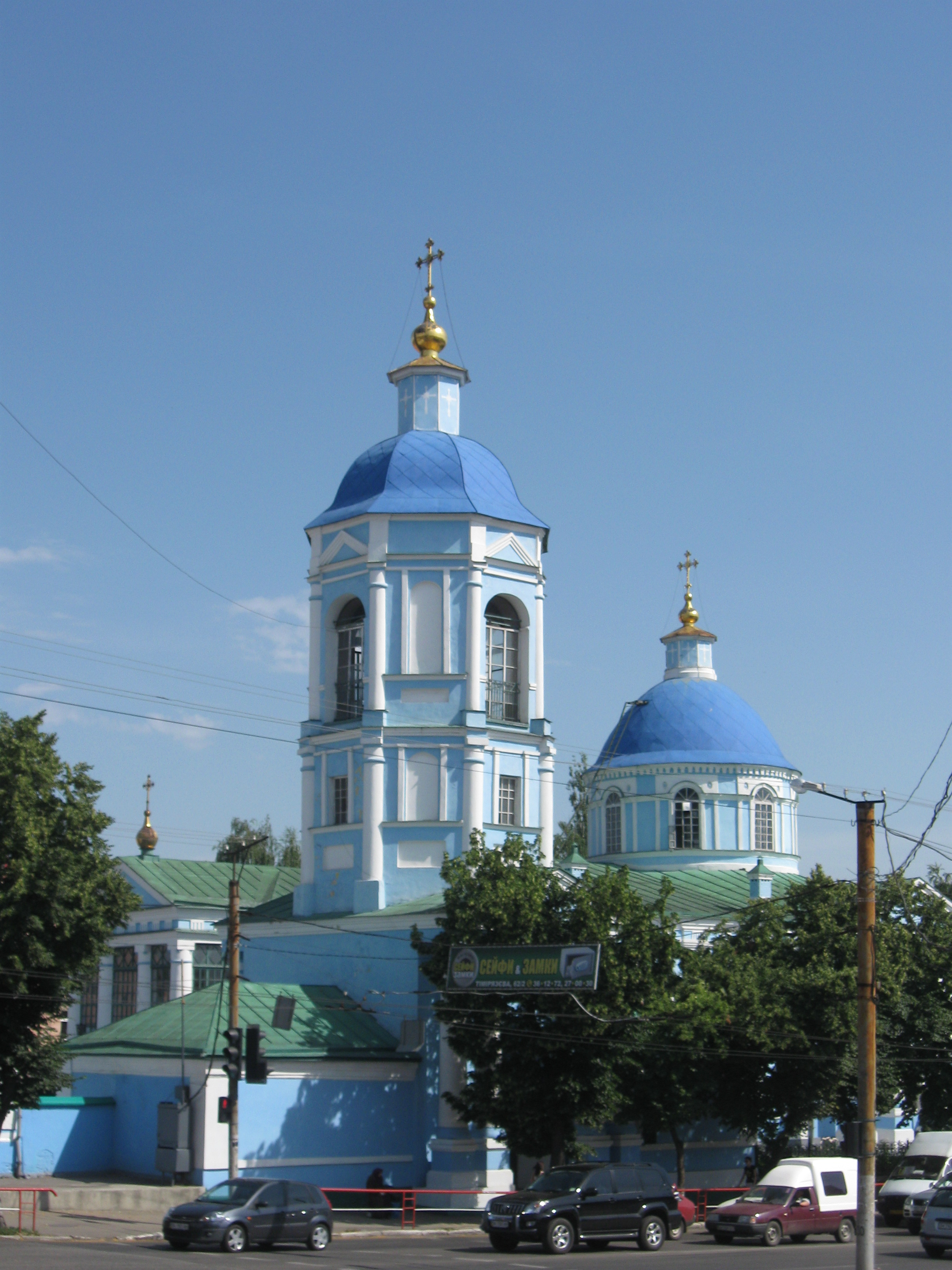
Church of the Nativity of the Theotokos

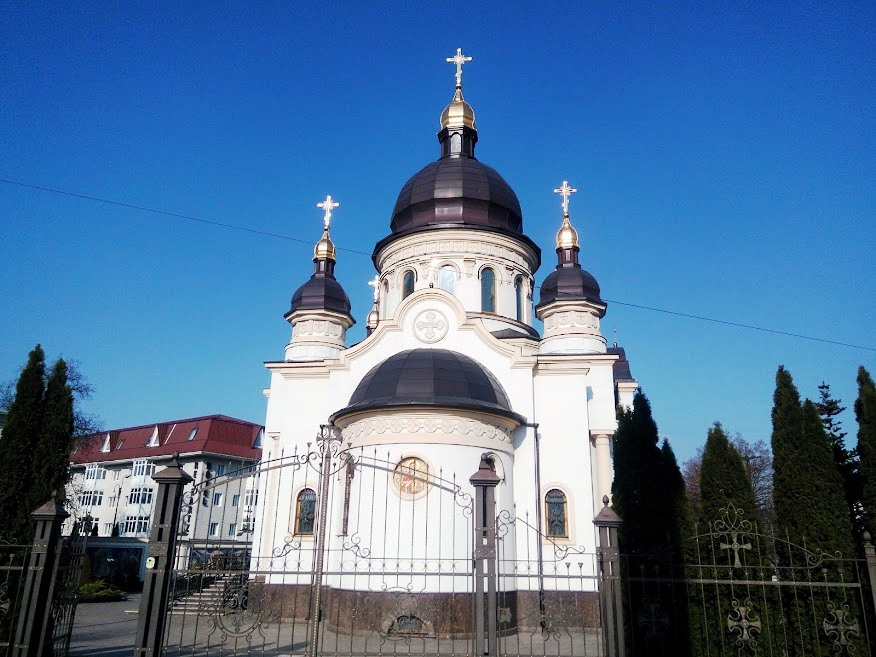
Church of the Annunciation of the Blessed Virgin Mary

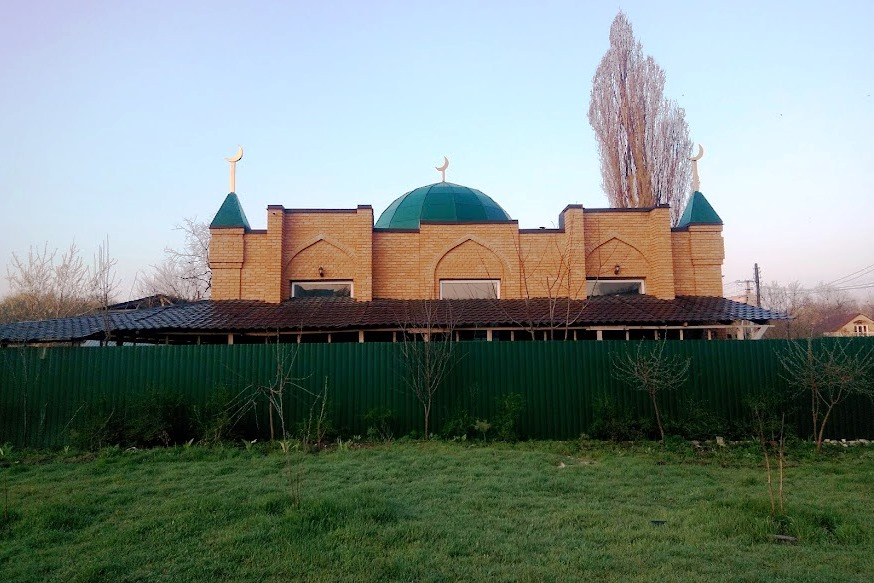
Kovsar Mosque

Kropyvnytskyi's residents belong to the religious traditions of the Orthodox Church of Ukraine and historically Judaism. There are also smaller communities of Protestants such as Baptists, Seventh-day Adventists, and Jehovah's Witnesses, Roman Catholics, and Islam.

The largest community in the city is Christian Orthodox. Historically, the Ukrainian Orthodox Church – Moscow Patriarchate was the largest jurisdiction in the city, with 17 churches, in the city with the Cathedral of the Annunciation, the Dormition church, and the Church of St. Athanasius, being some of the largest. However, many residents have since switched over to UOC-KP, with the city's deputies attempting to ban the MP in the city following the Russian invasion of Ukraine. Another Orthodox jurisdiction, Ukrainian Autocephalous Orthodox Church, was first organised in the city in 1991 by activists from the People's Movement of Ukraine, although it did not gain much traction. Instead, the UOC-KP, which started in the city in August 1996, gained more traction and by 2009 had four parishes. The Orthodox Church of Ukraine, which was created with the merging of the Autocephalous and UOC-KP churches has since expanded to seven churches as of 2025. Other small Christian groups include the Ukrainian Greek Catholic Church, which first had a cross concentrated at the future Church of the Nativity of John the Baptist in 2008. Prior to the opening of a full-fledged church, they held services in the basement of the Roman Catholic Church of the Holy Spirit. There is also a small Roman Catholic community, which was first founded by Poles in 1882, although most of the community now descends from immigrants from Galicia.

Judaism was historically important in the city, with a high of 27.6% of the population adhering to the religion in 1926. Its main venue was the Great Choral Synagogue, which was built in 1895 on the site of another synagogue that was demolished in 1853. Although no longer as large, the community still congregates at the synagogue building, with four communities residing in the city. There is also a small community of Islam in the city. They opened a mosque in the city in 2017, the only one in the entire oblast, and as of that date, have about 30 worshippers who attend weekly prayers regularly.

== Culture ==
=== Attractions ===
Entrance to the Arboretum

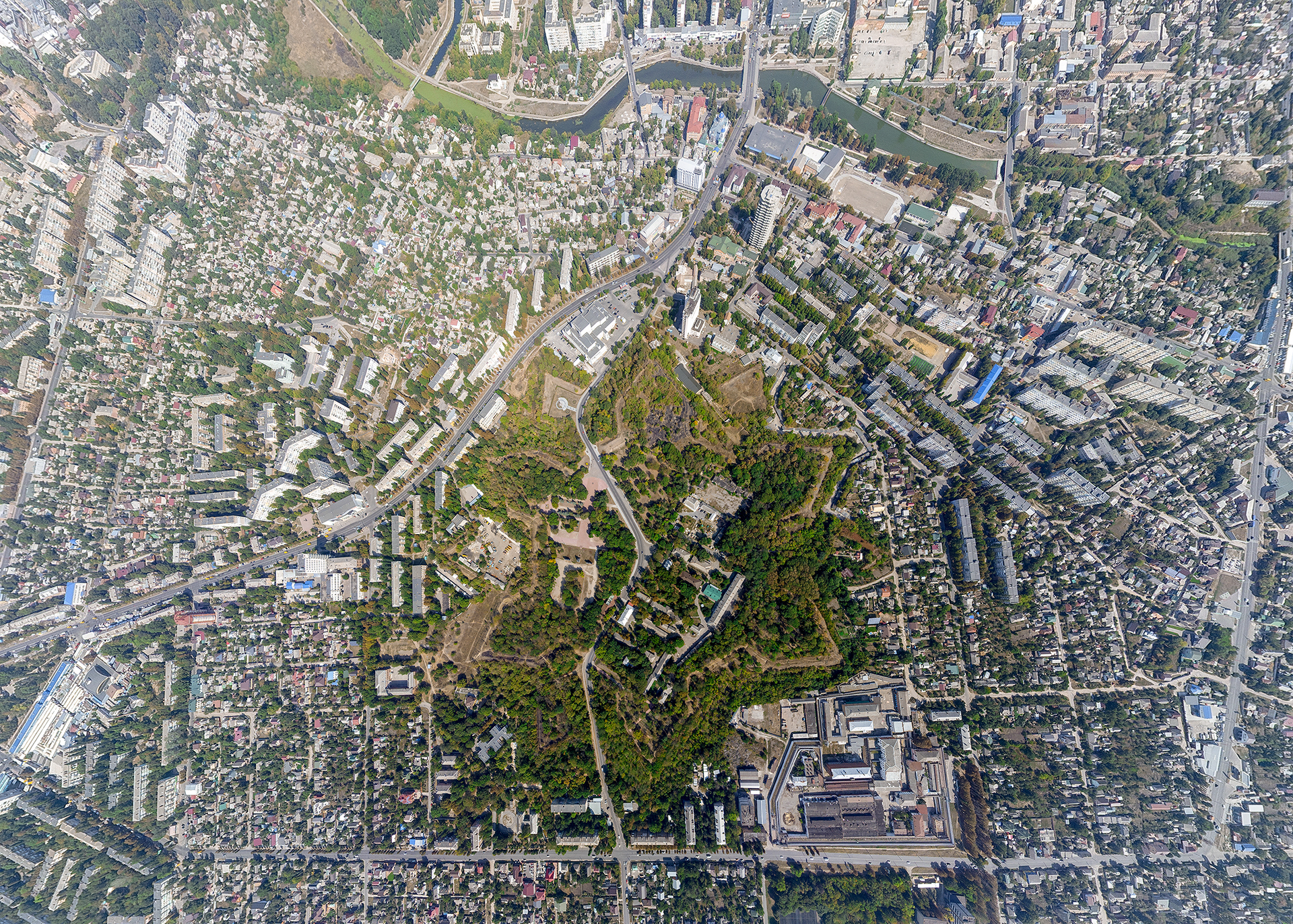
Fortress of St. Elizabeth within the city

Guardian Angel of Ukraine in the city centre

The historic centre contains numerous architecturally important buildings built in the 19th and 20th centuries by Yakiv Pauchenko and Oleksandr Lyshnevsky. These include the former Illusion Theatre, the guest court, Pauchenko's private house (now used as a museum), and the music and drama theatres. Other historic buildings in these areas include the Great Choral Synagogue, the former women's gymnasium, St. Anne Hospital, and the Goldenberg Hospital. The oldest part of the historic centre is the former Fortress of St. Elizabeth, which was built in 1754, and forms a closed polygon that held around a thousand cannons at its prime. The fortress is around 57 hectares, and among its surviving items are two guns on pedestals at the entrance, some of the barracks, officers' houses, and a garrison church. Outside of the fortress is the historical-memorial complex "Memorial of Glory" to World War II. Other important buildings in the city include the former Junkers' cavalry school, which was the headquarters of a reserve cavalry corps and was the city's largest educational institution. The complex includes a three-story palace block, staff and teaching blocks, and a riding hall, now used by the military. Its former parade ground is now Kovalivskyi Park. Kovalivskyi Park holds two monuments: a sign to partisans and the monument "Glory to the Fallen Heroes".

Besides the city centre, there is also Teatralna Street, which is the cultural centre of the city. The theatre named after Marko Kropyvnytskyi is located on the street, alongside a monument to Kropyvnytskyi himself, one of the liberators of Kirovohrad, and a monument to the firm tram in the city. On nearby Soborna Square is the "Guardian Angel of Ukraine", a victory column inscribed with a plea for God to protect Ukraine, and at the top, a bronze angel. The city's largest park is Dendopark, or the Arboretum, which was founded in 1958 with about 50 species of trees and shrubs. It has been a park-monument since 1972, was revived in the early 2000s, and now covers 45 hectares of greenery and landscaping. It features a spring tulip display, which has over a million bulbs a year. There is also a summer cinema, zoo, covered stage, an open-air ice rink, and the Aquadendropark.

=== Performing arts ===
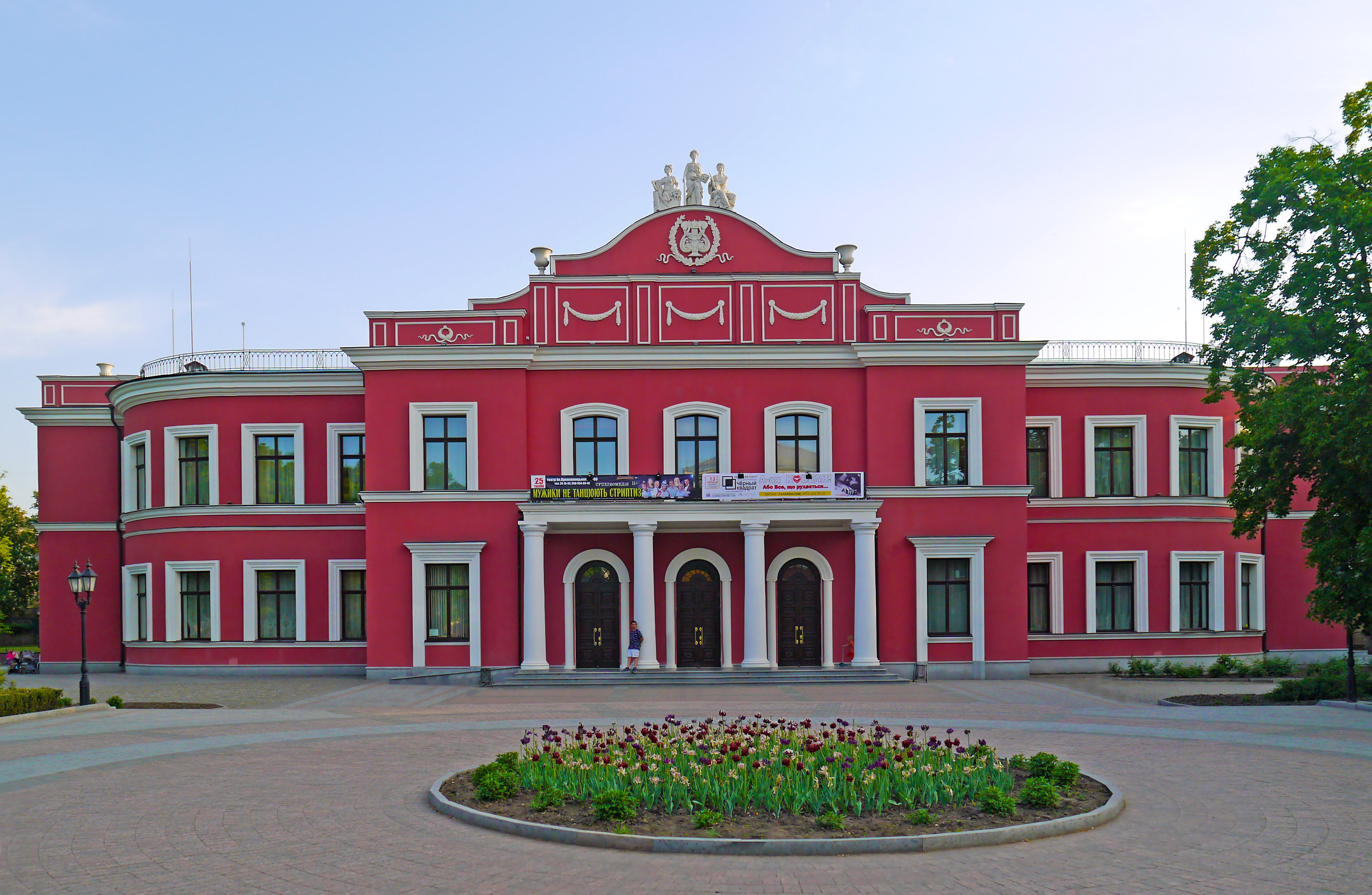
Kirovohrad Academic Ukrainian Music and Drama Theater

The city has two principal performing arts places: the Kropyvnytskyi Academic Regional Ukrainian Music and Drama Theatre and the Kirovohrad Oblast Puppet Theatre. The former was founded in 1882 by Marko Kropyvnytskyi, but it was shut down for some time, relocated to Oleksandriia, and returned to the city in 1944. It received the status of "academic" from the oblast council in February 2006. The theatre mainly performs Ukrainian classics and dramas, as well as some world plays, and hosts an annual national festival. The latter was founded in September 1939, and is currently housed in a building at Bohdan Khmelnytskyi Square. The company also tours across Ukraine and internationally, and has won multiple awards, including at the International Puppet Theatre Festival. It got its "academic" status in November 2009, and currently hosts around 600 performances per year that are attended by 70,000 people.

=== Music ===
Philharmonic hall

The city's main musical venue is the Kropyvnytskyi Oblast Philharmonic, which was originally founded between 1939 and 1944 at Kovalivsky Park. At the park, it also had a summer performance venue, which hosted choral ensembles, including by the State Ukrainian Choir. Construction on a dedicated concert hall for the philharmonic began in the autumn of 1954 and was completed in January 1956. The philharmonic, in addition to its main performances, has launched an annual chamber-music festival and a children's philharmonic since 1991 to help develop youth arts.

=== Museums ===
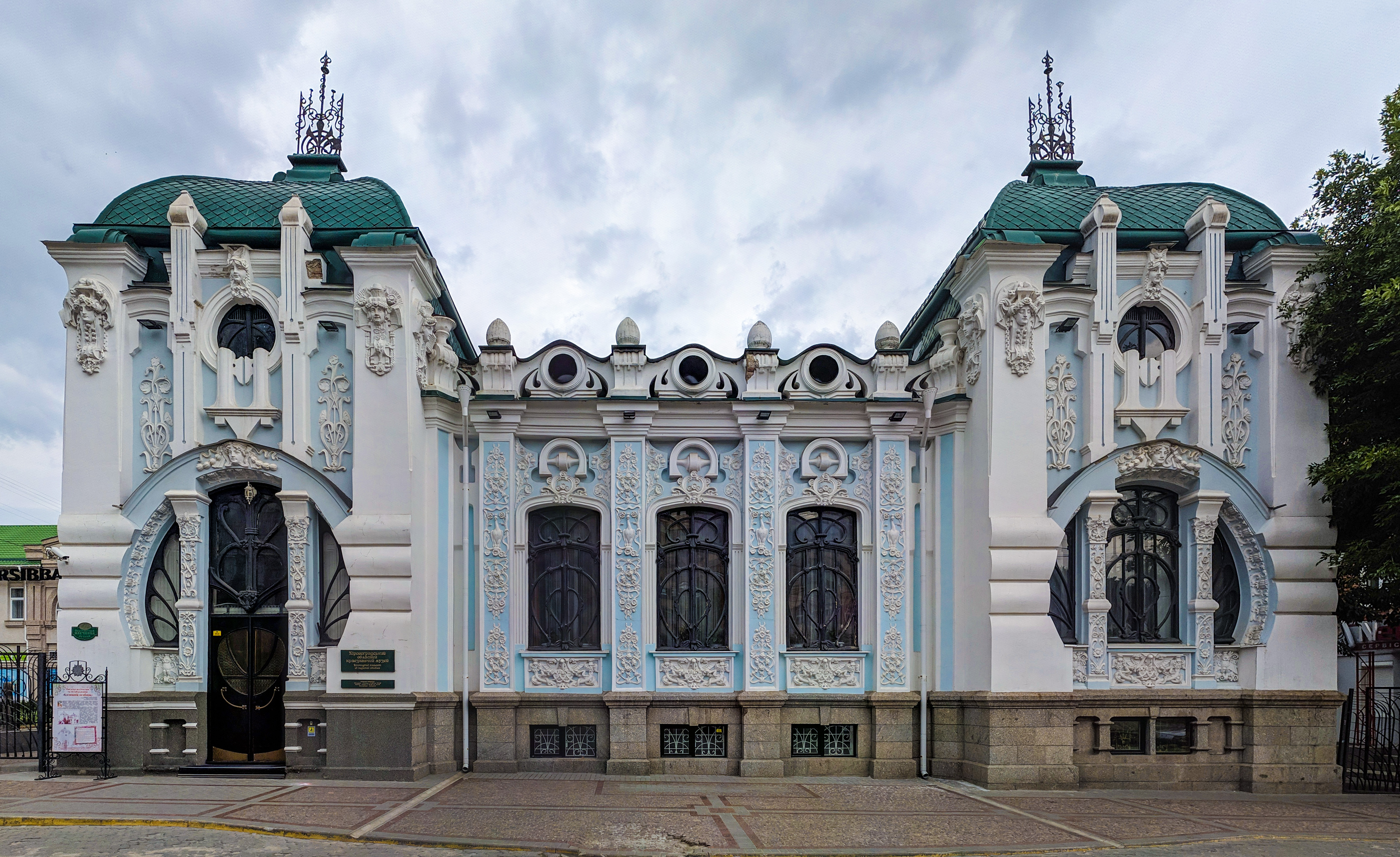
Central Ukrainian Regional Museum of Local Lore

The city has a number of museums including the Regional Museum of Local Lore, Memorial Museum of M. L. Kropyvnytskyi, Regional Art Museum, Oleksandr Osmiorkin Art Memorial Museum, Heinrich Neuhaus Museum, Ivan Karpenko-Kary Literary Memorial Museum, Karol Szymanowski Museum of Musical Culture, and Historical Museum "Jews of Yelisavetgrad". The Regional Museum of Local Lore is the city's most famous museum and was opened in 1883 at the zemstvo real school, but stopped operating for some time from 1898 until 1922. It was split between a historical-archeological museum and a natural-historical museum that year, with the natural-historical museum being considered the basis of the current museum, as the historical-archaeological museum formed the Museum of the Revolution, which was destroyed during World War II. The museum currently has 80,000 items covering ancient times to the present, including one of the largest collections of Scythian materials and publications of the Tobilevych family. The Memorial Museum of M. L. Kropyvnytskyi honours Marko Kropyvnytskyi and his life, being housed at the place where Kropyvnytskyi lived for 20 years. The museum holds 8,000 items divided among six halls, and has existed since October 1982.

The Regional Art Museum was formed in 1921 as a gallery of the natural-historical museum and was completely looted during World War II. It was revived in 1965 as a department before later becoming independent in 1993, and it currently houses three halls of mostly Slavic artists. The O.O. Osmiorkin Art Museum is dedicated to the painter Oleksandr Osmiorkin and was opened in 1994 at the childhood home of Osmiorkin. The Museum of Musical Culture was established in 1991 based on a memorial room dedicated to Karol Szymanowski, a member of the Young Poland movement. It now preserves music from prominent figures throughout the oblast and has 3,790 items in its main fund, with 2,923 in its other fund. The last museum is dedicated to the historical Jewish population of Kropyvnytskyi, and is thus housed in the historical Great Choral Synagogue. It covers the first Jews in the city all the way to the 1917 revolution and how they contributed to the city.

=== Sports ===
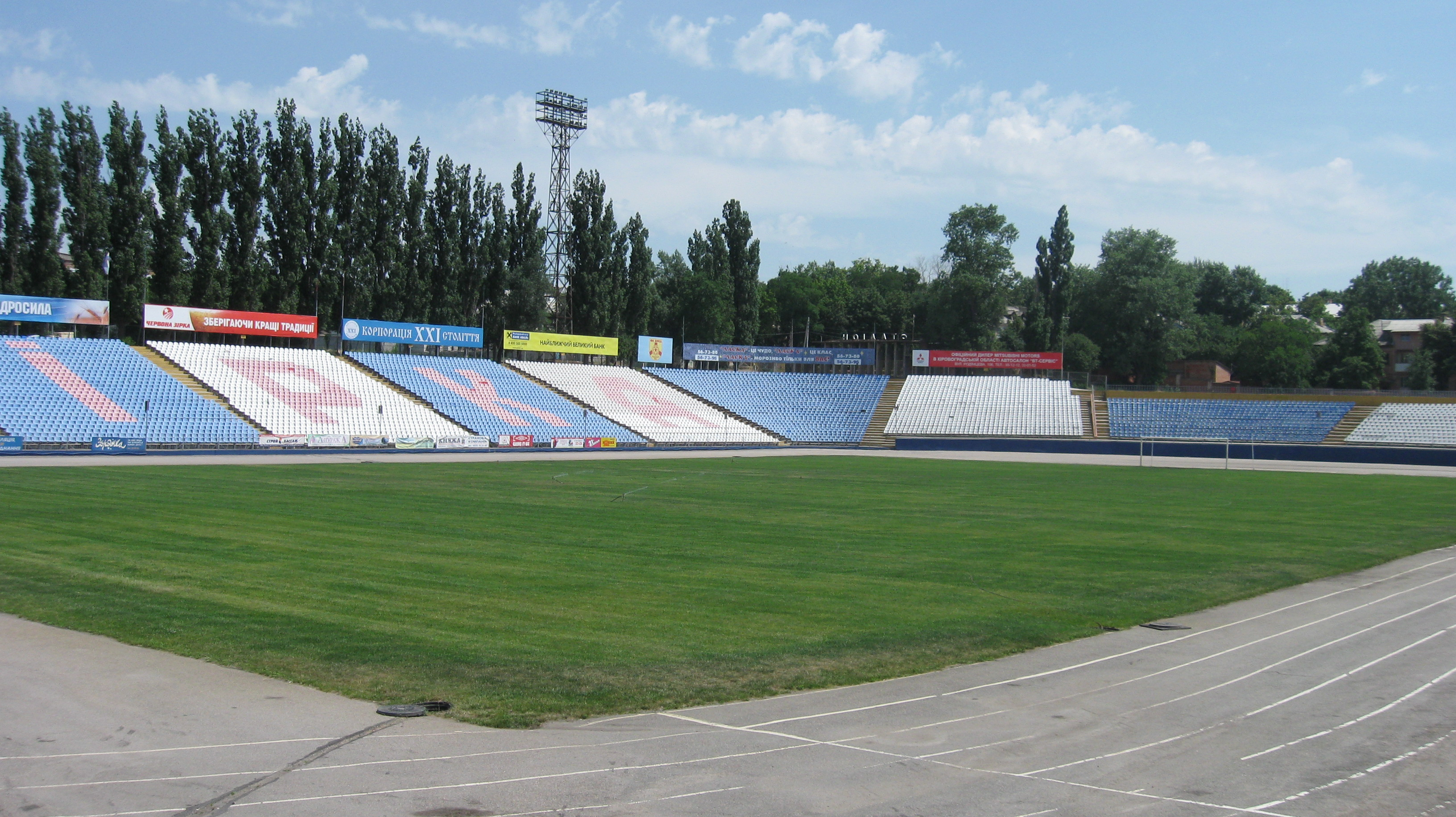
Zirka Stadium

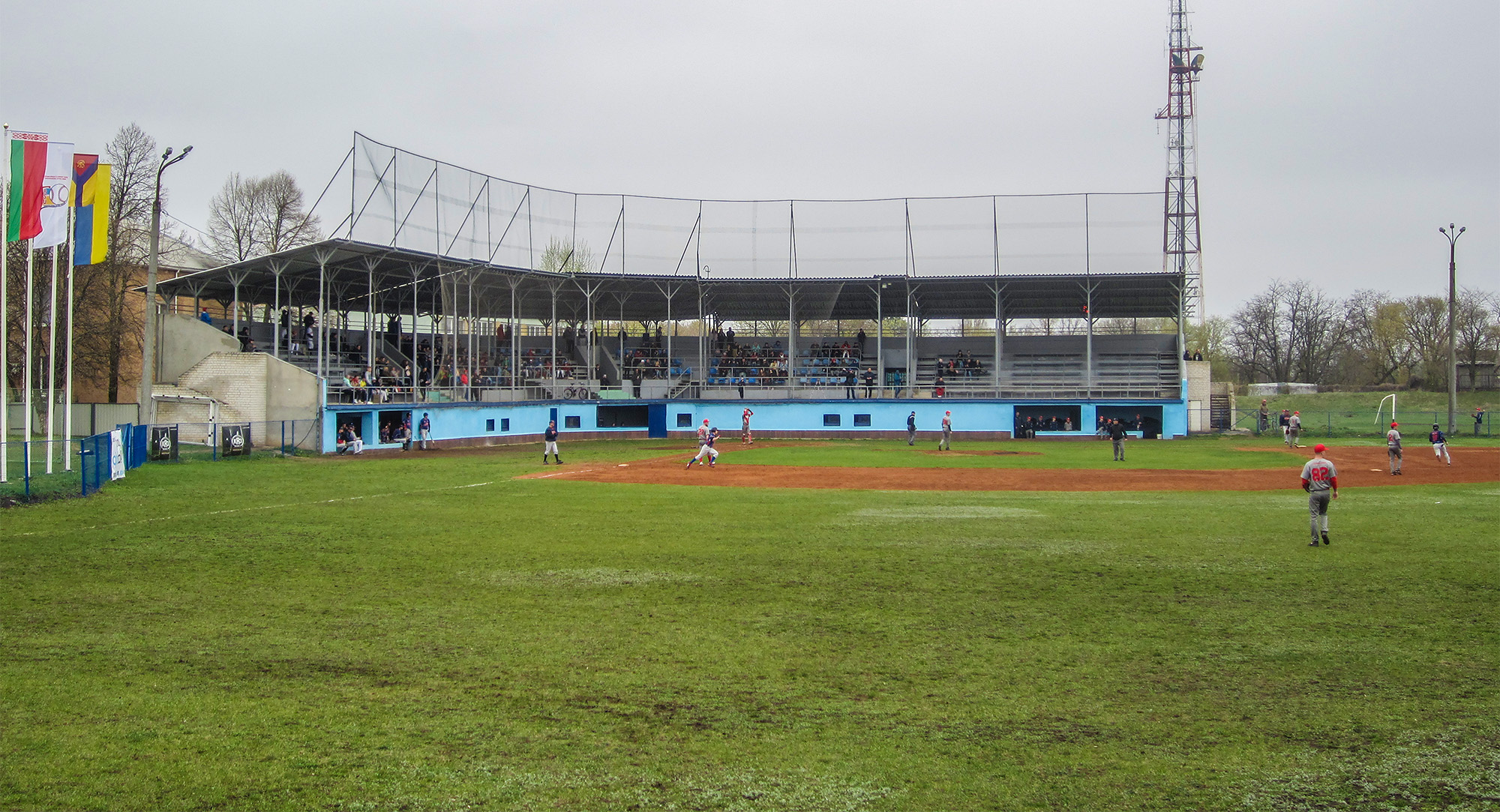
Diamond Baseball Stadium

In terms of association football, the city is mainly home to FC Zirka Kropyvnytskyi, which currently plays in the Ukrainian Amateur Football Championship. The last time they placed in the Ukrainian Premier League was in the 2017-18 season, when they were relegated in playoffs by FC Desna Chernihiv. Zirka was originally though to have been established either in 1922 (when a workers' club played from the factories), 1935 (when a friendly was played between Kirovo and Kutaisi), or 1958 (when it debuted in the USSR as a Class B team). Further research, however, indicates that the club was likely founded in 1911 by a circle of footballers from the Elworthy team against the men's gymnasium team. Zirka later entered Class A in 1966, and reached a peak in the 1970s, winning the Ukrainian SSR Cup in 1973 and 1975. After Ukrainian independence, it was variously shut down and revived until 2008, when it was finally permanently revived. The other important football club in the city is the amateur club FC Olimpik Kropyvnytskyi, which has played in both the regional championship of Kirovohrad Oblast and the Ukrainian Amateur Football Championship. Olimpik was founded in 2000 as a youth club, but began playing professional football in 2007. In July 2008, its team was swapped and renamed to "Zirka" when Zirka was revived, while Olimpik continued to exist but as an amateur club.

In addition to football, the city has a women's basketball club known as "Yelysavet-Basket". Their most notable achievement has been winning gold in the Ukrainian Women's Basketball SuperLeague during the 2013-14 season, beating out TIM-SKUF Kyiv. There is also a baseball club in the city known as Biotechkom-KNTU. The club plays professionally and is historically dominant, having won 23 national titles in baseball since 1995. They also have a junior team, which has won silver and bronze in the Ukrainian baseball cup. Most members of the Ukraine national baseball team come from the club. The city also hosts an international baseball tournament known as the "Kolodytskyi Cup". The main stadium of the city is Zirka Stadium, which is the home ground for FC Zirka Kropyvnytskyi and has a capacity of 13,667 people. In 2012 was purchased by the club from the State Property Fund. Reconstruction began in 2013 and was completed in 2014. The stadium was named after Stanislav Berezkin, a business owner and the father of Zirka club president Maksym Berezkin, following Stanislav's passing. Other stadiums include ARZ, which underwent reconstruction in the spring of 2013, and the Diamond Stadium, which is the home ground of Biotechkom-KNTU. In 2023, Serhiy Kuzmenko said work would be done on repairing the Diamond Stadium.

=== City symbols ===
==== Coat of arms ====
The earliest associated coat of arms of the city is from the Fortress of St. Elizabeth, which has an azure field, a monogram of Elizabeth the Great beneath a golden crown, and two silver sabers with golden hilts. An actual coat of arms for the city itself was first approved in August 1845, which read, "In the upper half of the shield, in a gold field, the State Arms of Russia; and in the lower half, in a red field, an earthen fortification, within which the monogram of Empress Elizaveta Petrovna; and on either side of it, the year 1754." After the establishment of Soviet power, the city did not use a coat of arms officially until the next approved one in January 1969, which has a middle azure field with golden wheat and a golden gear wheel that has the city's name, a bottom field in green with a cannon and cannonballs, and a top red field with a circle that has a hammer and sickle. Following independence, in 1996, a new coat of arms was approved, which has two forms. The smaller version on a shield has a golden field, a blue inverted forked cross cutting off a red base, and, in the centre, a black outline of the Fortress of St. Elizabeth ground plan with a red monogram of St. Elizabeth on a golden field. In the larger form the shield is within a silver Cartouche which has a golden crown on top and two silver storks next to it. There is also golden wheat at the bottom and a decorative blue ribbon that has the motto "With peace and good". The symbolism is as follows: it uses parts of the 1845 coat of arms (gold field and fortress ground plan), the blue forked cross represents the confluence of the Inhul, Sugokleia, and Biianka rivers, the St. Elizabeth monogram is a replacement of the Elizabeth the Great monogram, the red colour is in honour of the Cossacks, the storks come from the local legend of a Cossack named Leleka founding a winter settlement in the area and storks have always come to the Inhul, the crown is due to being he oblast centre, and the wheat and gold represent agriculture.

==== Flag ====
The flag of the city was also adopted in 1996 and consists of a square banner with a blue forked cross in blue, two yellow bands on the right, and a red triangle. In the centre of the red part is a golden monogram of St. Elizabeth.

Coat of arms of Kropyvnytskyi

Flag of Kropyvnytskyi

== Economy ==
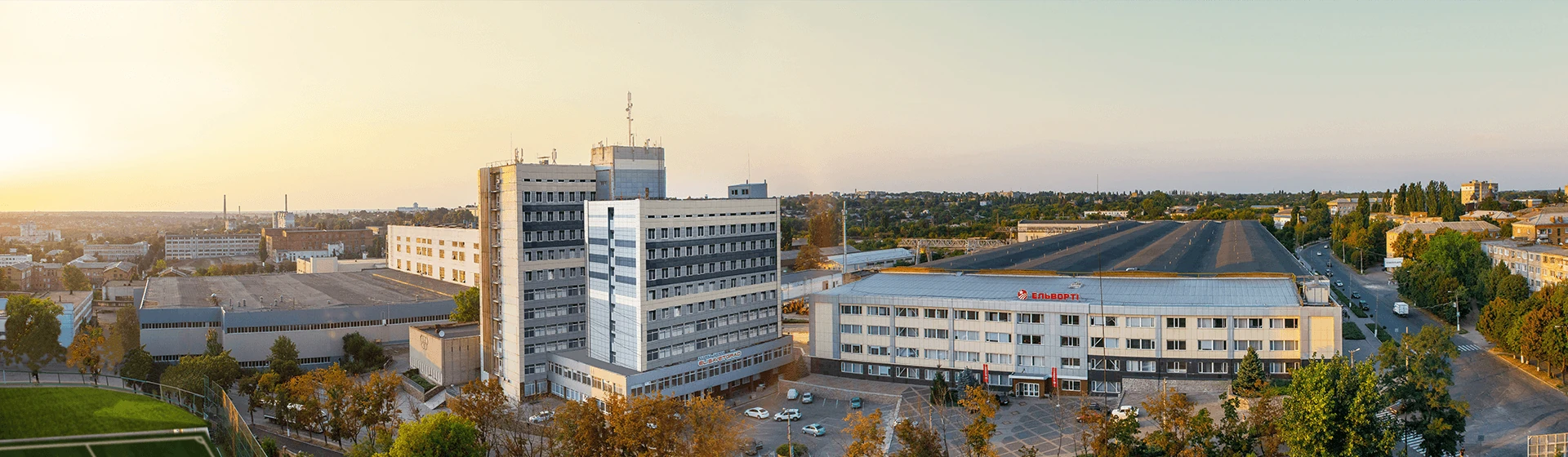
Production buildings of Elworthy (Elvorti) in the city.

Workers at the Hydrosila plant

The economy of the city is primarily based on agricultural machinery manufacturing and food processing. As of the mid-2010s, the city has 132 enterprises that are classified as major across a variety of branches such as chemicals, machine-building, woodworking, textiles, and beverage manufacturing. There are also more than 4,000 small enterprises, of which 2,700 are retail outlets, and 24 markets. Foreign investment in the city as of 2016 stands at $24.9 million, mostly from India, China, Belarus, and Russia. The enterprises in the city account for 50.7% of all goods sold across the entire oblast, and 31.3% of the oblast's capital investment, as of 2018.

The city's biggest enterprise is the company Elvorti (or Elworthy in English), which is an agricultural machinery company that was founded in 1874 by British industrialists Robert and Thomas Elworthy. The plant, after becoming one of the largest agricultural machinery manufacturers in Ukraine with 7,000 workers in 1917, was renamed Chervona Zirka in 1922 after being nationalised. Since then, it has been a public joint-stock company, and closed the year 2016 with a net profit of 170.42 million hryvnias. Another large enterprise in the city is Hydrosila, which manufactures gear pumps and hydraulic units for AvtoKrAZ, BelAZ, and Rostselmash, among other companies. The last large enterprise is Radiy, which designs automated control systems for nuclear power plants in Ukraine and acoustic systems.

Other smaller enterprises in the food-processing sector include Kirovohradoliya, which processes oilseed, a branch of the Creative Group, which does oil extraction, the Yatran meat-processing plant for sausages and other meat products, and the Sokolivskyi canning plant, which produces products for "Sonola" and "Delikon". There is also in the light industry the Zorianka sewing factory, which mostly produces outerwear for designer firms.

== Education ==
=== Higher education ===
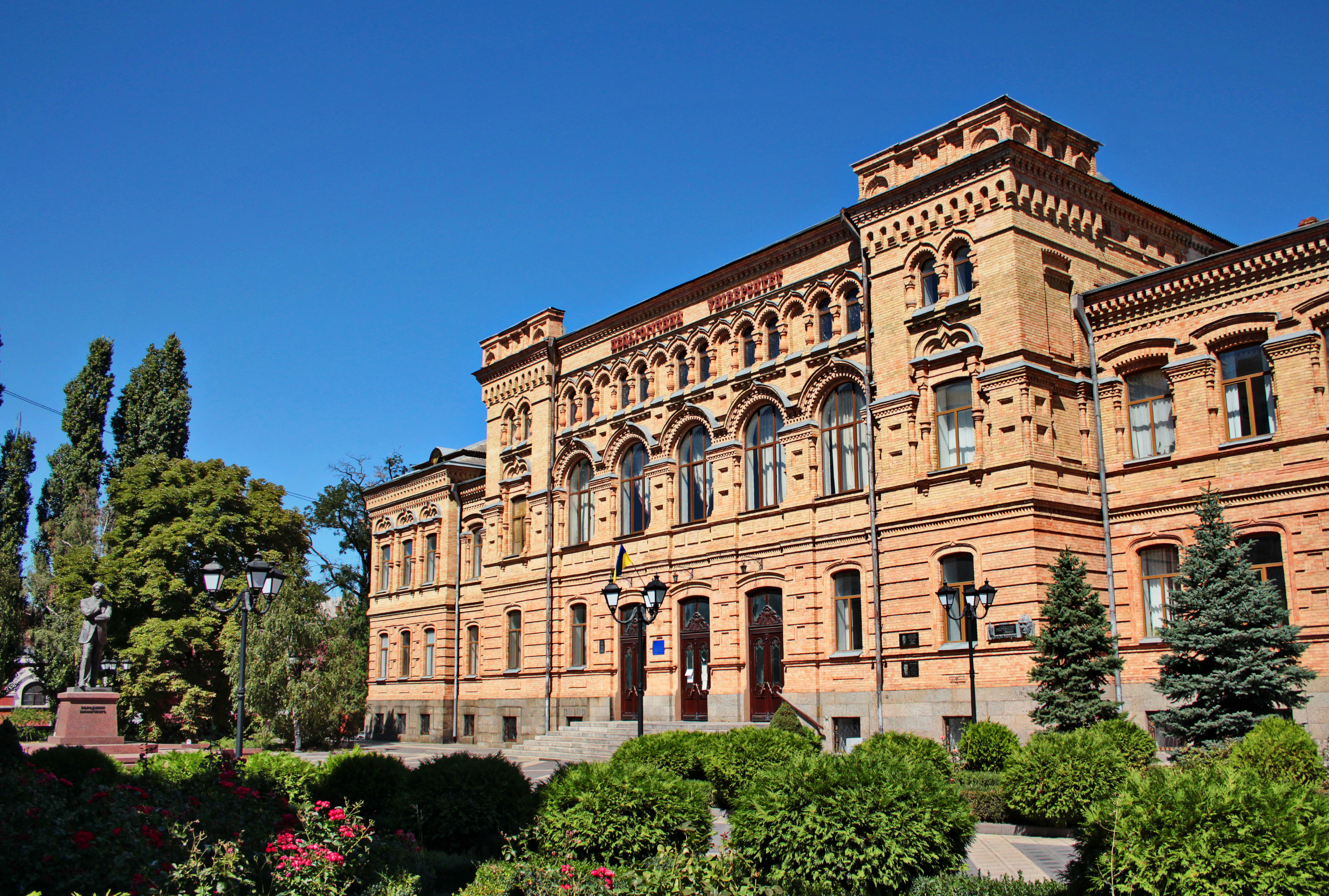
The former women's gymnasium, now used as the campus of Volodymyr Vynnychenko Central Ukrainian State University

There are 23 institutions of higher education in the city as of 2005. There are three with the highest level of accreditation, III-IV: Kirovohrad State Pedagogical University named after Volodymyr Vynnychenko, the Kirovohrad National Technical University, and the State Flight Academy of Ukraine. Other I-II institutions include the Kirovohrad Medical College, Kirovohrad Commercial Technicum, Kirovohrad Music School, Kirovohrad Construction Technicum, College of Economics and Law, Technicum of Agricultural Mechanisation, Kirovohrad Cybernetic-Technical College, and the Kirovohrad Technicum of Statistics. There are also branch colleges, such as for the Kyiv National University of Culture and Arts and the Interregional Academy of Personnel Management.

=== Secondary education ===
For secondary education, there are 38 institutions enrolling 26,000 students as of 2023. 15 of these are vocational-technical schools. Since the start of the Russian invasion of Ukraine, the department of education in the city has issued the course "Know! Be Able! Save!" that covers civil defense and basic medical skills. Some schools have also used remote learning, depending on the shelters.

=== Public libraries ===
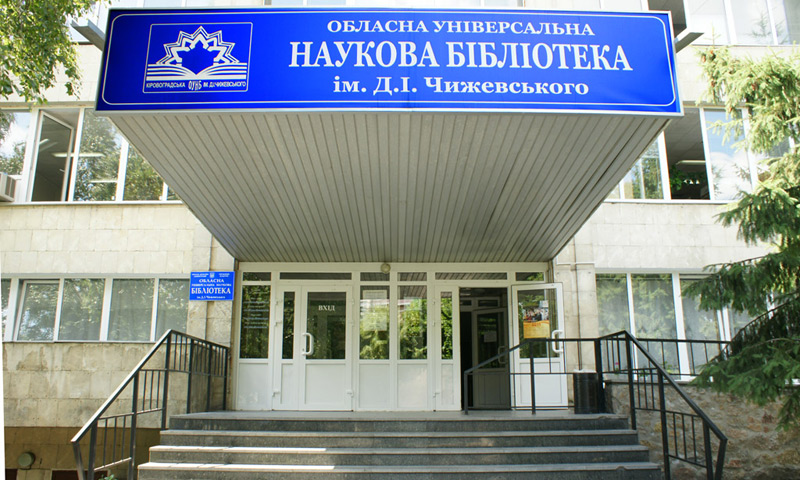
Premises of Kropyvnytskyi Region Universal Research Library

The main library of the city is the Kropyvnytskyi Region Universal Research Library, which serves as a library for the whole oblast and has the largest collections of items within the entire oblast. It was first established in February 1899 as the Yelysavethrad Public Library at the Bardakh house with 2,500 works. The collection was damaged during World War II and was later moved to a four-story building on Velyka Perspektyvna. Currently, the library has 20 subdivisions and holds roughly 800,000 works, with 17,000 being classified as rare or valuable. The other oblast-level library is the Youth Library for teenagers and young adults. It was opened in December 1978 and currently has a collection of 117,000 items. The library also holds numerous initiatives, such as "Open Doors" which was a televised youth discussion club. Locally, the city is also served by the municipal library system, with the main library being the Central Library at 6 Druzhby Narodiv Square.

== Infrastructure ==
=== Transportation ===
==== Local transportation ====
===== Trolleybuses =====
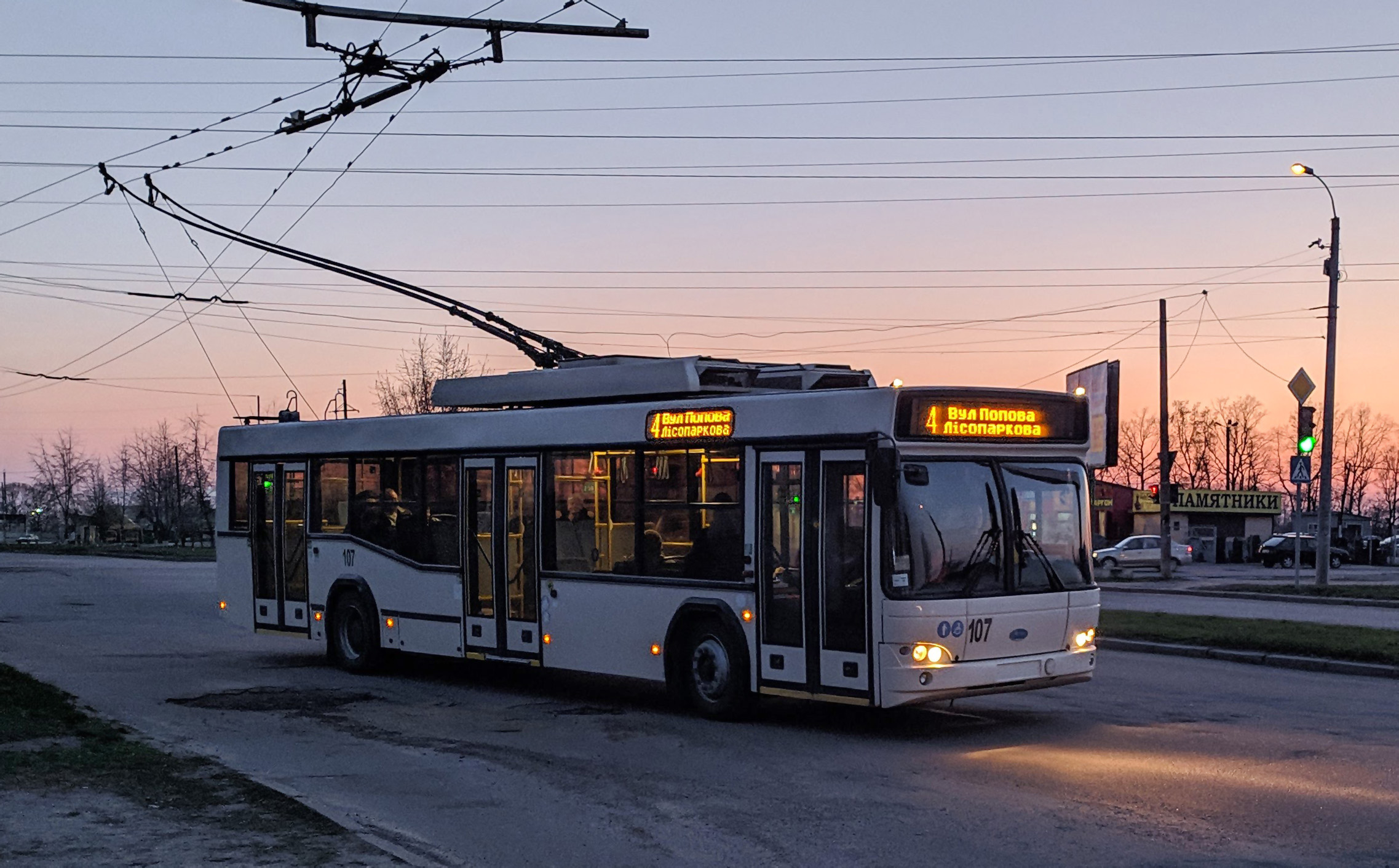
A Dnipro T103 in 2019.

Kropyvnytskyi has a trolleybus system, which is operated by KP "Elektrotrans". The system has existed since 4 November 1967, replacing the earlier tram system, going from Depo to the CHPP. The initial fleet consisted of eight Kyiv-4 model trolleys. During the rest of the Soviet era, the city mainly used MTB-82 units, which became known locally as "the blue trolleybus", and Romanian-produced Rocar DAC units starting in the 1970s. By 1990, the city had eleven trolley routes, although by the early 2000s nine of them were closed in favour of buses. After Ukrainian independence, the city also shifted to using Ukrainian-produced YuMZ-T2 (made at Pivdenmash). Starting in December 2004, the trolleybus operator was leased to the private company LLC "ETK" until 25 April 2016, when the ownership was returned to the communal enterprise "Elektrotrans". Mayor Andrii Raikovych said the move was done under his program to keep electric transit as the primary mode of public transport, and that the fleet needed to be renewed. That same year, it was announced that the city, following an auction through Prozorro, would buy 20 Dnipro T103 trolleybuses produced by DUOTRANS LLC in Dnipro.

As part of efforts to renew the fleet under Raikovych, in September 2018, an agreement was signed with the European Bank for Reconstruction and Development (EBRD) for a 282 million hryvnia loan. Under this loan, the main focus was on getting[autonomous trolleybuses, with the five-batch of autonomous Dnipro-T203 trolleybuses arriving in mid-December 2018 through a leasing arrangement with PrivatBank. The rest of the autonomous trolleybuses were eventually rolled out on routes following test runs in 2019. The number of routes also gradually recovered during this time to 10 by 2022. Following the Russian invasion of Ukraine, trolleybus frequency was curtailed under conditions of martial law, and eventually, due to Russian strikes, service was entirely stopped on 24 November 2022 until 1 December 2022. As of 2024, the city maintains 52.5 km of contact network, one depot, six traction substations, and ten routes. The last older YuMZ-T2 was retired in May 2024 also.

====== Current routes ======
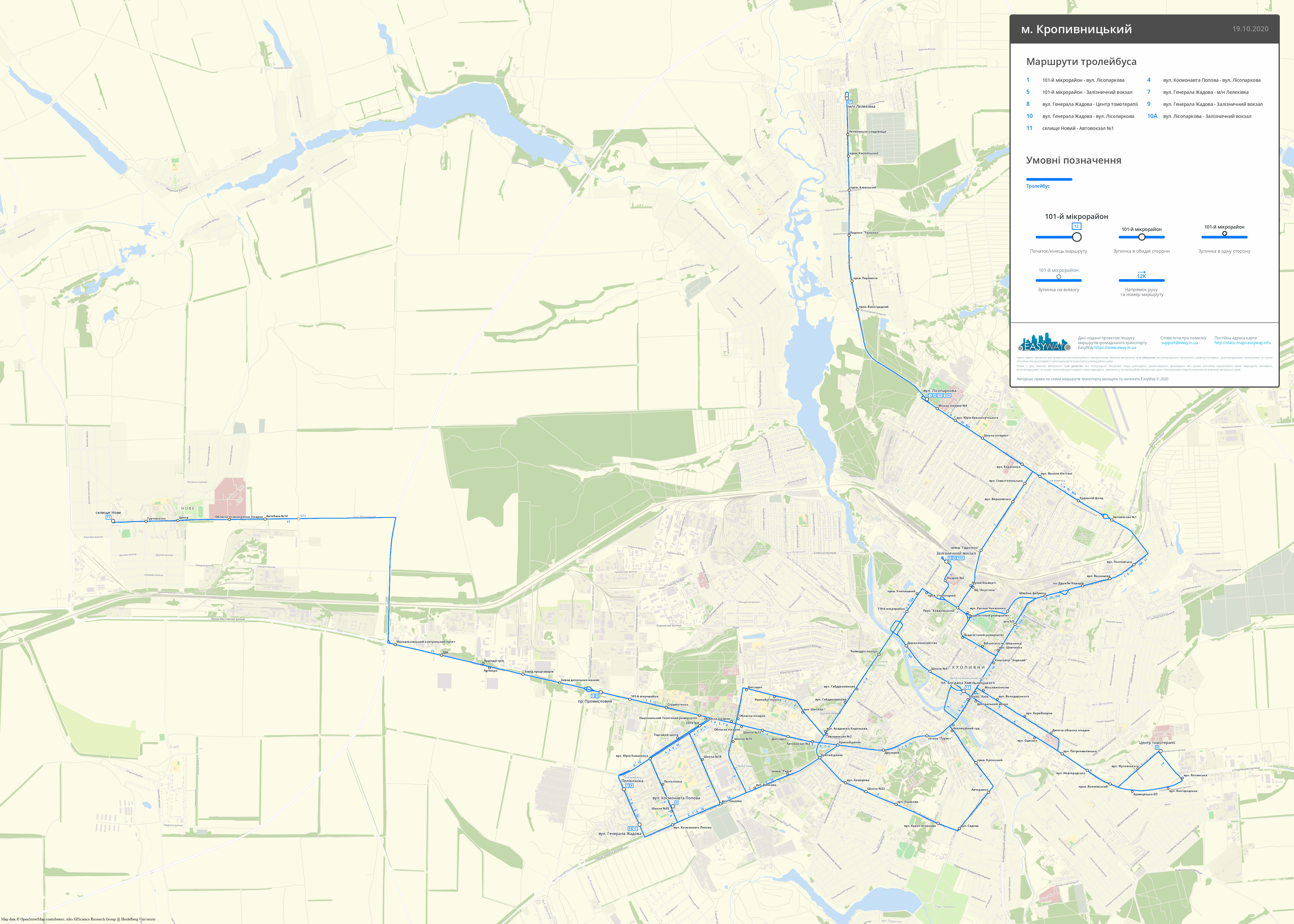
Map of trolleybus routes

As of 2026, the city operates a reduced amount of eight different routes for trolleybuses:

- Route No. 1: 101st Microdistrict to Lisoparkova Street (13.61 km)
- Route No. 4: Nezalezhnosti Street to Lisoparkova Street (12.88 km)
- Route No. 5: 101st Microdistrict to CHPP (12.22 km)
- Route No. 7: Derzhavnosti Street to Lelekivka Microdistrict (17.44 km)
- Route No. 7A: Derzhavnosti Street to Lelekivka Microdistrict (18.75 km)
- Route No. 8: Derzhavnosti Street to Oblast Oncology Center (11.43 km)
- Route No. 9: Derzhavnosti Street to Railway Station (7.8 km)
- Route No. 10: Derzhavnosti Street to Lisoparkova Street (12.39 km)

===== City buses =====
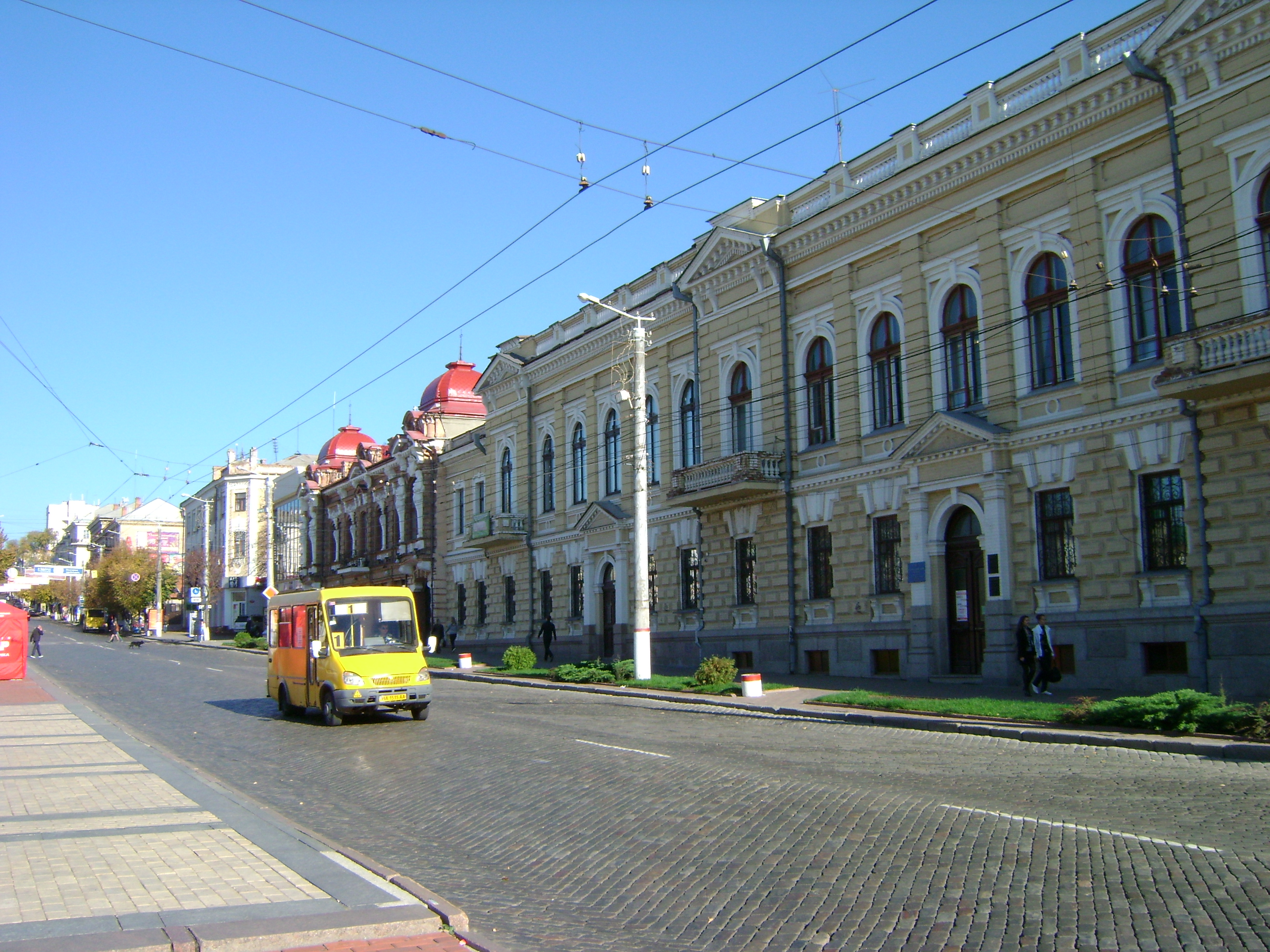
A bus near the State Bank in 2012.

Kropyvnytskyi has both suburban city buses and intercity bus service alongside Marshrutkas. PP "Ursa-trans", a private enterprise founded in 2009, operates the main intercity routes from the "Kropyvnytski-2" bus station to Svitlovodsk, Mala Vyska, Oleksandrivka, and Chervonyi Yar, among other cities. Ursa-trans primarily operates domestically made BAZ-A079 buses and Etalon-made buses, alongside some imported minibuses.

The status of marshrutkas has previously been disputed with the city council over fares, leading to silent pickets in 2009 and some drivers refusing to work. That same year, there was also a feud with marshrutkas after Oleksandr Varvansky, the owner of "Avto-Lehion" carrier, accused the city prosecutor, Oleksandr Babikov, of selective enforcement against certain carriers. He also said that the company "Avtobusnyi Park 13527", which owned 17 MAZ-made buses, was awarded a route preferentially after its owner joined the city executive committee and stopped criticising previous government actions.

====== Current routes ======
As of 2026, the city operates twelve different routes for city buses:

- Route No. 46: The village of Hirnyche to Novomykolaivka
- Route No. 103: st. General Kulchytskyi to Kiltseva Street
- Route No. 104A: Bohdan Khmelnytsky Square to Covered Market
- Route No. 111: Stara Balashivka to Bohdan Khmelnytsky Square
- Route No. 114: Nikanorovka to Epicentr K store to Kiltseva
- Route No. 116: Nykanorivka to Molodizhne village
- Route No. 118: Velyka Balka to Central Market
- Route No. 119: Velyka Balka to Covered Market to Velyka Balka
- Route No. 123: Zavadivka to CHPP
- Route No. 125: Salganni Sands to Lisoparkova
- Route No. 130A: Katranivka to Lelekivka
- Route No. 274: Bohdan Khmelnytskyi Square to Nove village

===== Former trams =====
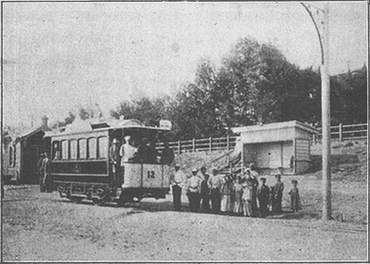
A tram in the city sometime in the 1800s.

In 1887, the first proposal for a tram system occurred in the city, for a horse-drawn one, with further proposals being considered in 1890 and 1895. Finally, in the spring of 1895, Ivan Likhachov, the executive director of the Belgian Tram Society in Moscow, proposed an electric one, which was approved, with Likhachov being granted operating rights for 50 years. Track-laying began in April 1897, with rolling stock coming from Cologne and equipment from AEG. Tram service officially began on 13 July 1897, going from the railway station to the Zelzer brewery. With the 1897 opening, the city was the fourth in the Russian Empire to have an electric tramway system after Kyiv, Nizhny Novgorod, and Dnipro. A second line was added in 1899, which ran four cars. New trams were also bought, including novelty open-topped summer cars, and by 1901 the tram system had carried over 2 million passengers.

Service was briefly stopped from 8 January 1918 to 1 May 1922 due to the Russian Civil War. Upon its resumption in 1922, 10 cars ran on the two lines. The lines were then further extended in 1929, and trams were brought in from Kharkiv to replace the older German Herbrand-made ones. Just before Operation Barbarossa, the tram network had 16.2 km of track, a depot of 29 cars, one traction substation, and a tram yard. There were also four routes after expansion. However, after the start of the war, by order, the Soviets blew up the city's power station to prevent German use, which entirely halted service. The Germans attempted to repair it, but upon this failure, they stopped and decided to instead dismantle the track and send it to Germany. The remaining tram cars were shipped to Vinnytsia, but they never arrived, and their fate is unknown. After the Soviets regained the city, there were some attempts to restore the tram network, but they were rejected in favour of trolleybuses, which were considered cheaper.

==== Railways ====
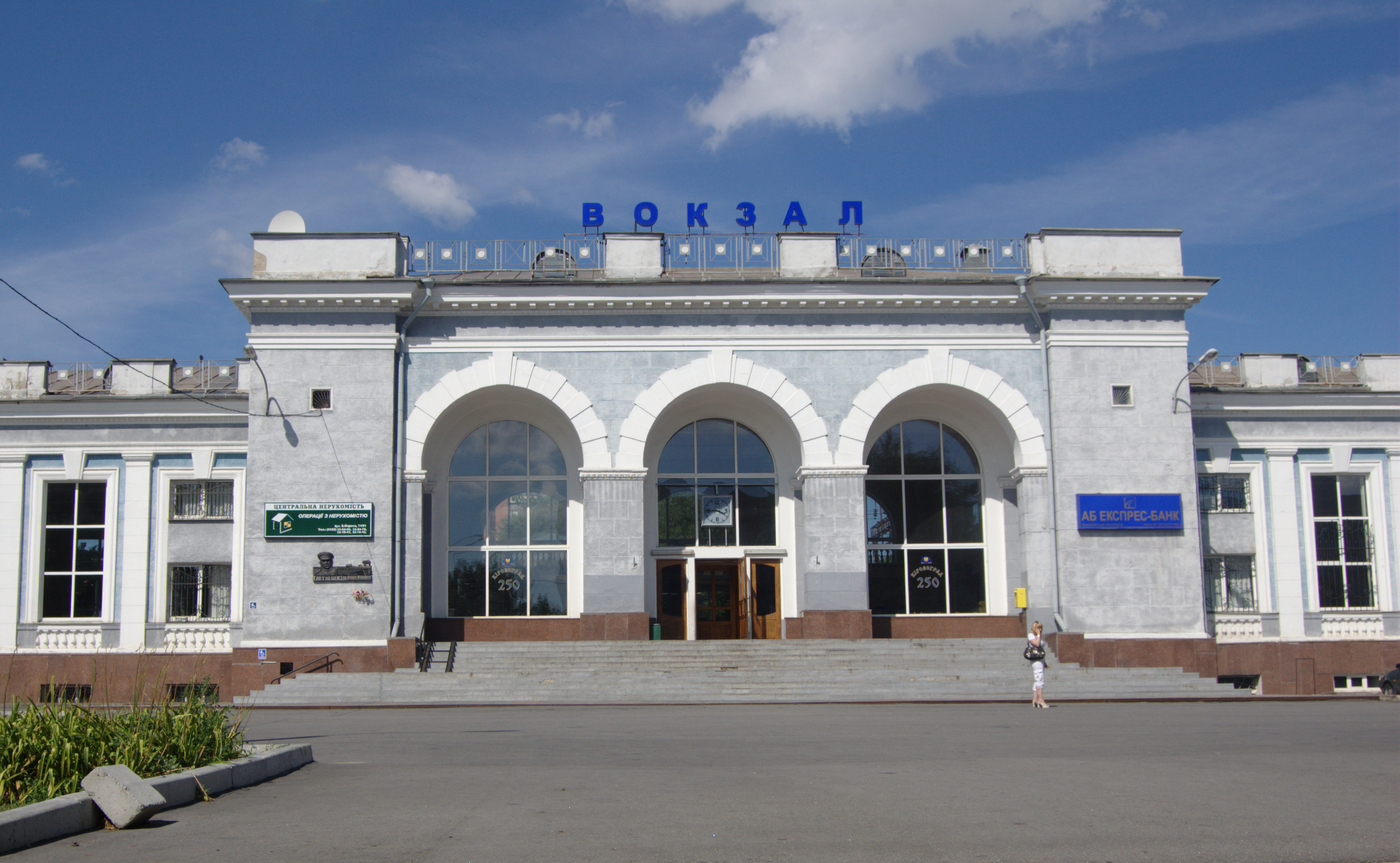
Main building of the railway station.

Kropyvnytskyi is a junction on Odesa Railways, which is a part of Ukrzaliznytsia. The city's main railway station is located near the centre of the city on Popovycha Street and is classified as class-2. The station was redesigned in 1954 to have a Neoclassical architectural style with two platforms to go to Pomichna and Znamianka. It was renamed from Kirovohrad to "Kropyvnytskyi on 1 April 2017 as part of the decommunisation effort. On average, as of 2018, the station receives around 2,200 passengers per day. Short-distance travel from the railway station includes Pomichna, Znamianka, and Kolosivka, while long-distance routes include most major cities like Kyiv, Kharkiv, Lviv, Dnipro, and Odesa, among others. The Kyiv line, in particular, was launched as express train No. 790, called the "Stolychnyi Ekspres" (Capital Express), on 11 December 2016 as a direct line.

==== Air transport ====
The former airport in the city

Kropyvnytskyi formerly had a working airport known as Kropyvnytskyi Airport (KGO). The airport was originally constructed during the Soviet era and, by 1990, was handling up to 600,000 passengers per year. After Ukrainian independence, the airport was managed by the municipal enterprise KP "Aeroport Kirovohrad", but the enterprise slowly experienced a downturn in the 2000s and was forced to sell off units of transport equipment, the air terminal building, and hangars, among other things. Due to this, in April 2008, there were plans to privatise the airport, at which point it was valued at around 3 million hryvnias. By early 2010, negotiations began for a 49-year lease lease of the airport to Air Urga to make it an international airport. However, the process was delayed due to the airport's runway situation, with only one working and the other unfinished. Urga at the time said that, in order to meet international standards, a second terminal would need to be built, and that most of the facilities failed to meet modernisation requirements. By October 2010, the new international passenger terminal was opened, and construction was ongoing to complete the second runway.

Six years later, Urga said they were planning to run Air charter service between the airport and Odesa using a Saab 340. However, nothing came of this, and by 2017 the Ministry of Infrastructure still only listed the airport as a class-D civil aerodrome that could handle Antonov An-24 aircraft and lighter aircraft. In 2019, the unfinished second runway came into dispute, with Serhiy Kuzmenko saying it would never be completed and that instead a new airport should be built on the basis of the Kanatove military airfield. Despite this, the State Flight Academy restored and certified the runway lighting in late 2020, allowing some night flights.

==== Roads and bridges ====
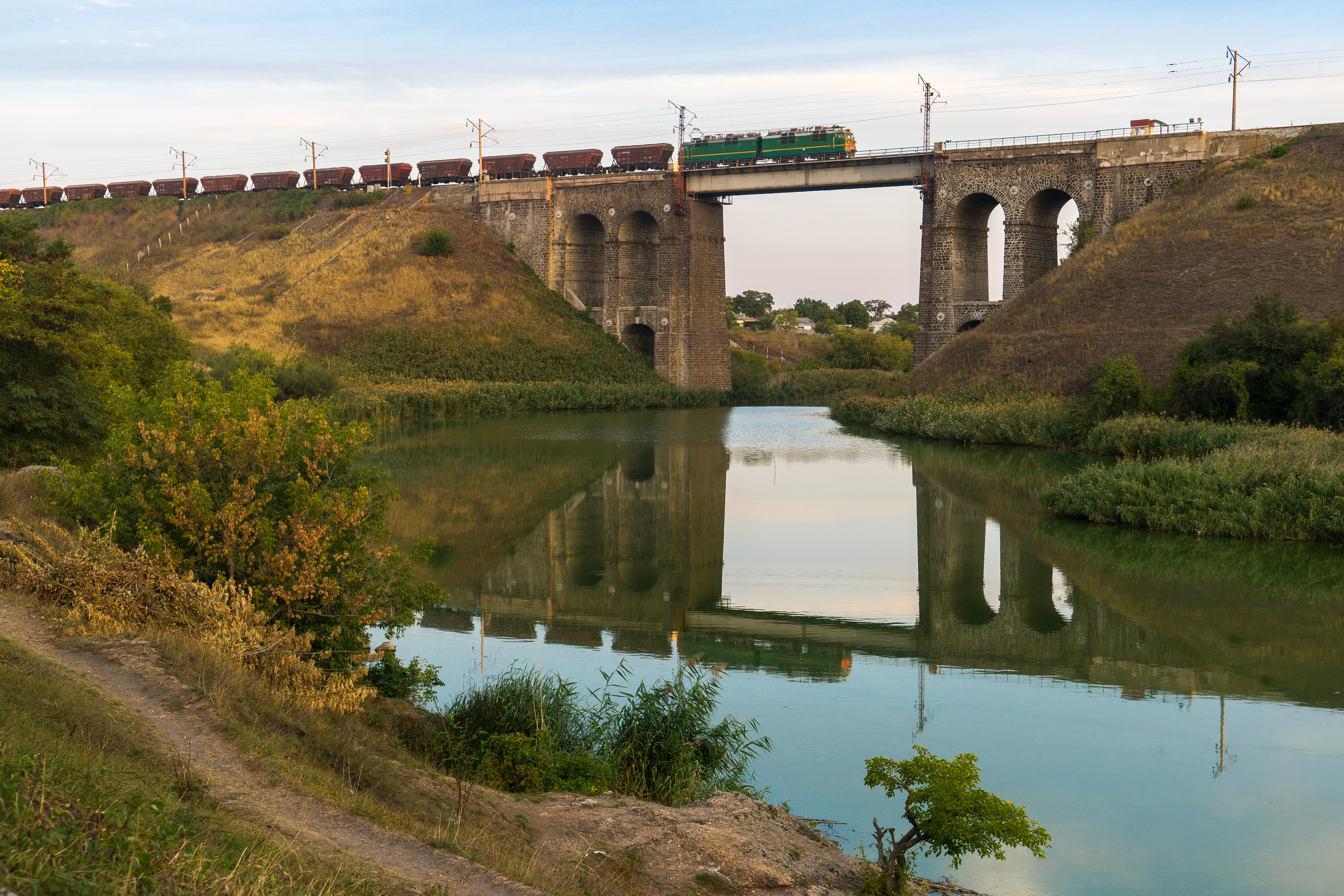
The railway bridge, the oldest bridge in the city

The international European route and crosses through the city. The Ukrainian international highways M13 and M30 do as well. In the case of M13, the road starts in the city and goes to the border with Moldova/Transnitria, and for M30, the road goes through the city to the Izvaryne-Donetsk checkpoint at the border with Russia. Kropyvnytskyi also passes through two national highways: H 14 and H 23. H14 passes through the city on the way to Mykolaiv, and H 23 starts in the city and goes to Zaporizhzhia. In terms of the T-network, the territorial route, the city is also connected to three routes: T 1201, T 1205, and T 1221. All three start in the city but go to different places, with T 1201 going to Novomyrhorod, T 1205 going to Oleksandriia, and T 1221 going to Rivne. The city also has around 151 bridges as of early 2020, which cross ten rivers and streams. The largest number of bridges cross the Inhul (28), the Biianka River and its tributaries (32), and the Sugokleia and its tributaries (29). The city's oldest bridge is the railway one near Novomykolaivka beach, which was constructed in the 1880s and revamped after World War II.

=== Energy and heating ===
Kropyvnytskyi CHPP

Energy and heat for the city primarily comes from the Kropyvnytskyi CHPP, which has operated since 1930 and is owned by the municipal enterprise KP "Teploenerhetyk". The CHPP was initially ordered to be constructed in 1926 by the All-Ukrainian Council of the National Economy (VURNH), with a formal contract being signed in Moscow in January 1927 between the DET and the city, which would also mainly help supply Chervona Zirka. The CHPP was eventually opened on 30 April 1930 with three boilers and two turbines, but was destroyed by the retreating Soviet forces. It was reconstructed after the war, and in 1968 it expanded from mainly supplying Chervona Zirka to also supplying district heating. As of 2023, the CHPP has a capacity of 15W of electrical turbine, 140 Gcal/hour boiler capacity, and 20 thousand kVa of combined transformer capacity.

The city also has 22 boiler houses and 163 km of heating lines. The main boiler house is the Southwestern boiler house at Promyslovyi Avenue, which provides heating to 2/3 of the city but is going to be decommissioned. Block-modular boiler houses are planned to be built as of 2024 to replace some of these. Most of this equipment also comes from the Soviet era and, due to this, has long since exceeded its lifespan, leading to planned repairs. In 2024, the city approved a ten-year heating development scheme for modernisation.

=== Water and sanitation ===
The city's water and sanitation services are managed by "Kropyvnytskyi Water and Sewage Utility", which is a division of the enterprise OKVP "Dnipro-Kirovohrad". Water comes from the water pipeline "Dnipro-Kirovohrad", which is fed by the Kremenchuk Reservoir and two local areas known as "Leleprivskyi" and "Kholodni Kliuchi". All water from the Kremenchuk Reservoir is processed at the Dnipro Water Treatment Station. Kholodni Kliuchi is a wellfield that has operated since 1966 and is on the right bank of the Inhul River and consists of 6 wells, while Leleprivskyi is also a wellfield that started in 1947. There are around 800.7 km of water networks with 10 pumping stations and three chlorination facilities in the city. For sewage, there are 307.7 km of lines with 24 pumping stations. There is also a sludge-dewatering facility that is under construction.

=== Medicine ===
Municipal Hospital No. 3

The city's healthcare is overseen by the Health Department of the Kropyvnytskyi City Council. The budget for the council, as of 2026, includes 12.6 million hryvnias for primary care, 18.8 million hryvnias for outpatient care, and 58.1 million hryvnias for inpatient care. There are seven public hospitals: the City Emergency Hospital, Polyclinic Association, No. 1 Centre for Primary Medical and Sanitary Care, No. 2 Centre for Primary Medical and Sanitary Care, the Ambulatory of General Practice and Family Medicine, Children's City Hospital, and the Central City Hospital. One of the hospitals, the Central City Hospital, has only around 20% of its patients coming from the city itself, and mainly cares for residents of the other five hromadas close by.

== Twin towns – sister cities ==
Kropyvnytskyi is twinned with:

- Krefeld, Germany (since 2023)
- Shaoxing, China (since 2018)
- Venlo, Netherlands (since 2023)

== Notable people ==
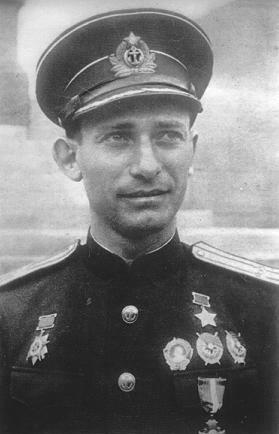
Israel Fisanovich, 1943

- Irina Belotelkin (1913–2009) a Russian-American artist and fashion designer
- Felix Blumenfeld (1863–1931) a Russian and Soviet composer, conductor and pianist
- Aaron Bodansky (1887–1960), a Russian-born American biochemist, developed the Bodansky unit
- Israel Fisanovich (1914–1944), a Soviet Navy submarine commander
- Moses Gomberg (1866–1947), a chemistry professor at the University of Michigan
- Boris Hessen (1893–1936), a Soviet physicist, philosopher and historian of science
- Oleh Korostelyov (born 1949), a Ukrainian engineer and scientist
- Boris Kotlyarov (1913-1982), a Soviet ethnomusicologist and violinist
- Heinrich Neuhaus (1888–1964), Russian pianist of German and Polish descent
- Yury Olesha (1899–1960), a Russian and Soviet writer and novelist
- Ivan Olinsky (1878–1962), a Jewish-Ukrainian and American painter and art instructor in New York and Connecticut
- Platon Poretsky (1846–1907), Russian Imperial astronomer, mathematician and logician, discovered Poretsky's law of forms
- Issachar Ber Ryback (1897–1935), a Jewish-Ukrainian-French painter and sculptor
- Nadia Lavrova Shapiro (1897–1989), Russian-American writer, translator and intelligence agent
- Afrikan Spir (1837–1890), a Russian neo-Kantian philosopher of German-Greek descent
- Arseny Tarkovsky (1907–1989), Russian poet
- Alexander Zaldastanov (born 1963), leader of the Night Wolves; Russia's largest motorcycle club
- Grigory Zinoviev (1883–1936), a prominent Old Bolshevik, executed during the Great Purge

=== Sport ===
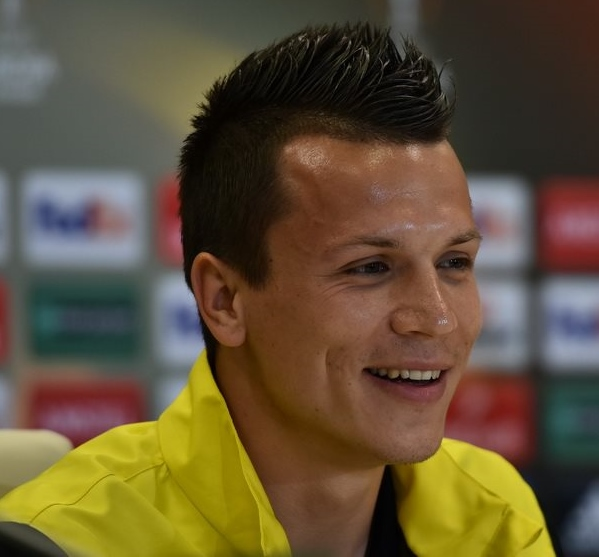
Yevhen Konoplyanka, 2016

- Andriy Pyatov (born 1984), former Ukrainian football player
- Olesya Dudnik (born 1974) a gymnastics coach and former artistic gymnast
- Grigory Gamarnik (1929–2018), Soviet wrestler, Greco-Roman world champion
- Andrei Kanchelskis (born 1969), footballer with 456 club caps and 36 for Russia
- Yevhen Konoplyanka (born 1989), footballer with 275 club caps and 86 for Ukraine
- Dmytro Mykhaylenko (born 1973), footballer with 376 club caps and 23 for Ukraine
- Serhiy Nazarenko (born 1980), footballer with 375 club caps and 56 for Ukraine
- Maurice Podoloff (1890–1985), American Hockey League and National Basketball Association administrator
- Valeriy Porkujan (born 1944), footballer with 240 club caps and 8 for the Soviet Union
- Andriy Rusol (born 1983), footballer with 252 club caps and 49 for Ukraine
- Alexei Suetin (1926–2001), Russian chess grandmaster and author
- Don Aminado (1888–1957), Russian Jewish emigre writer

== Gallery ==
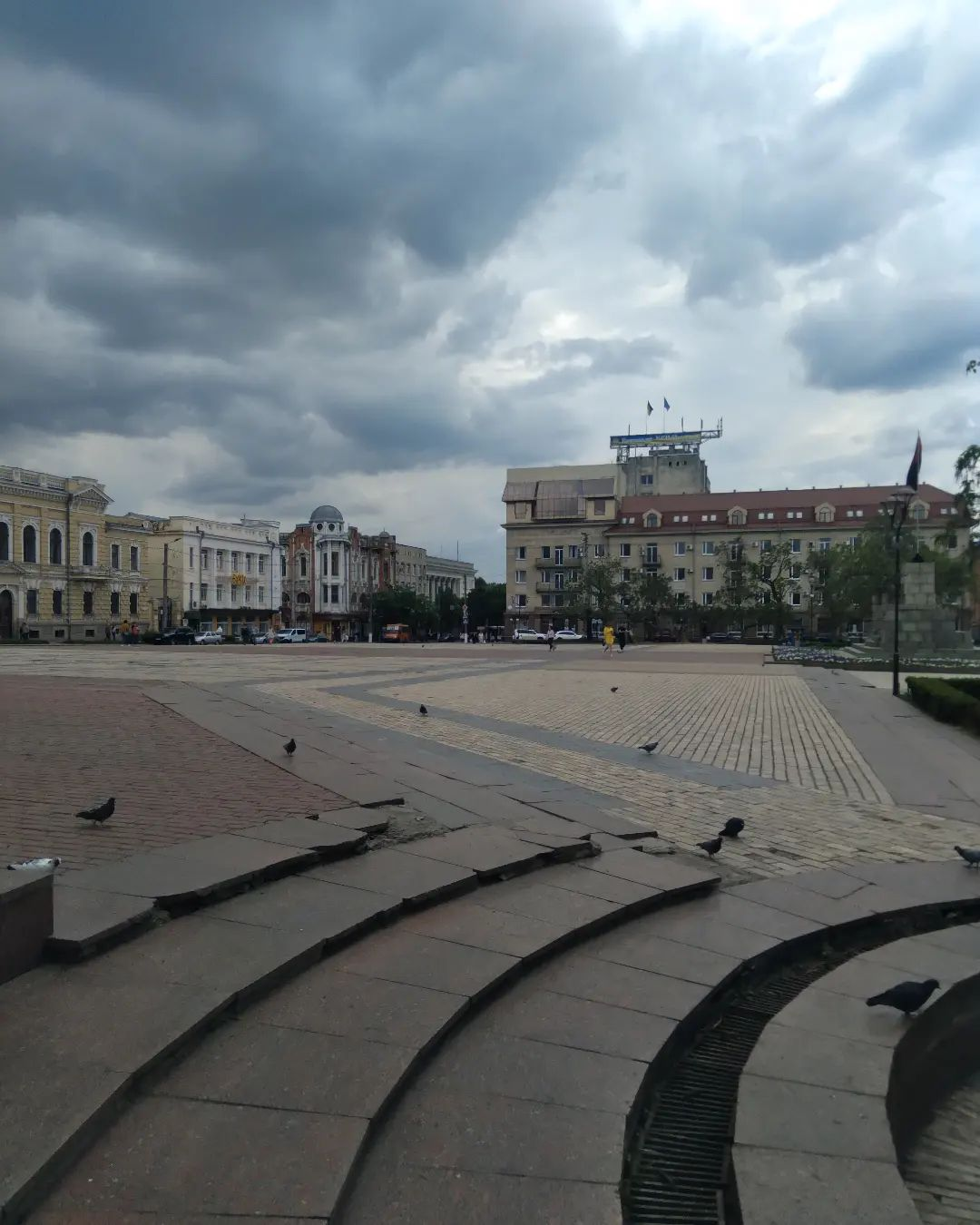
Central square, 2023

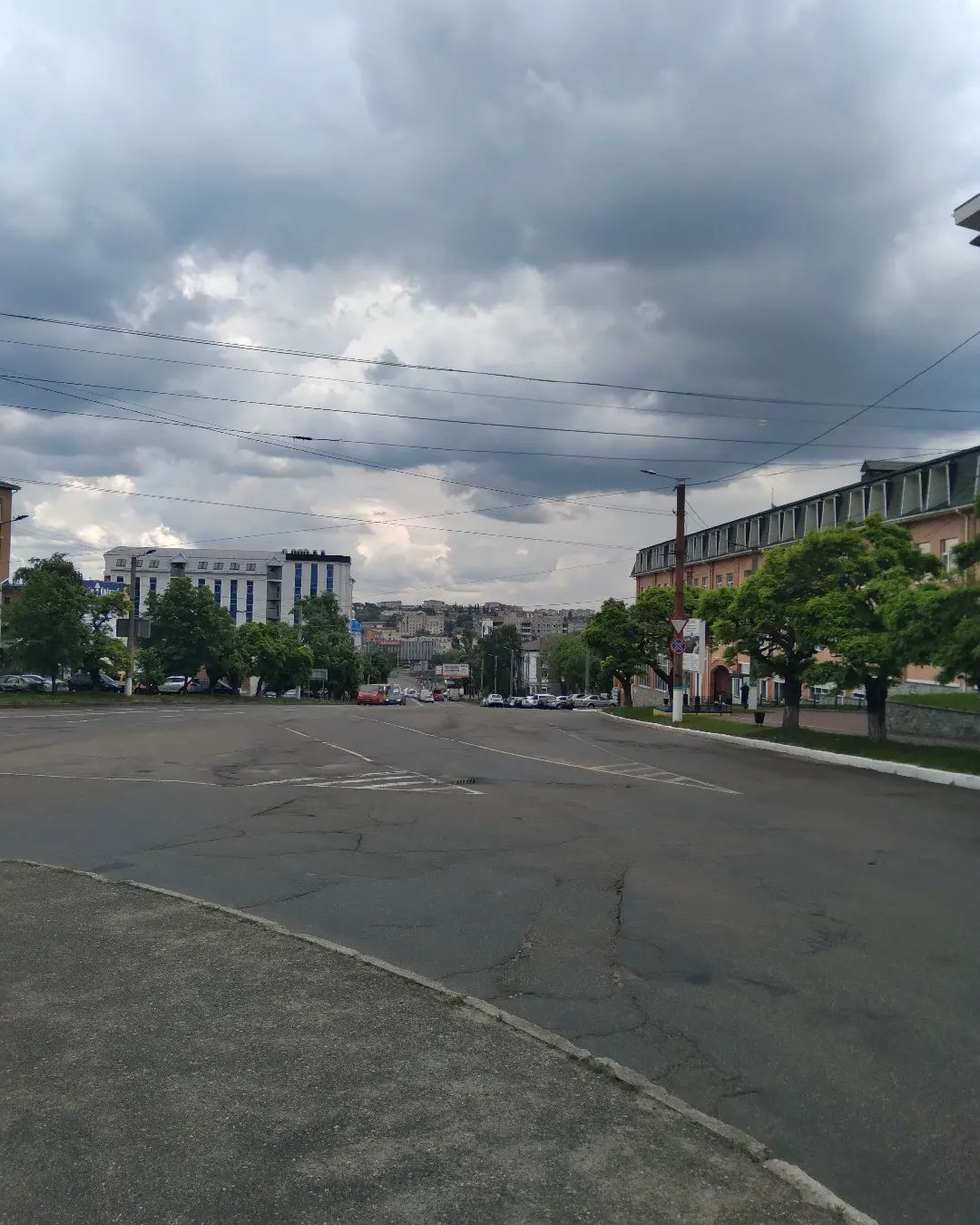
Downhill view

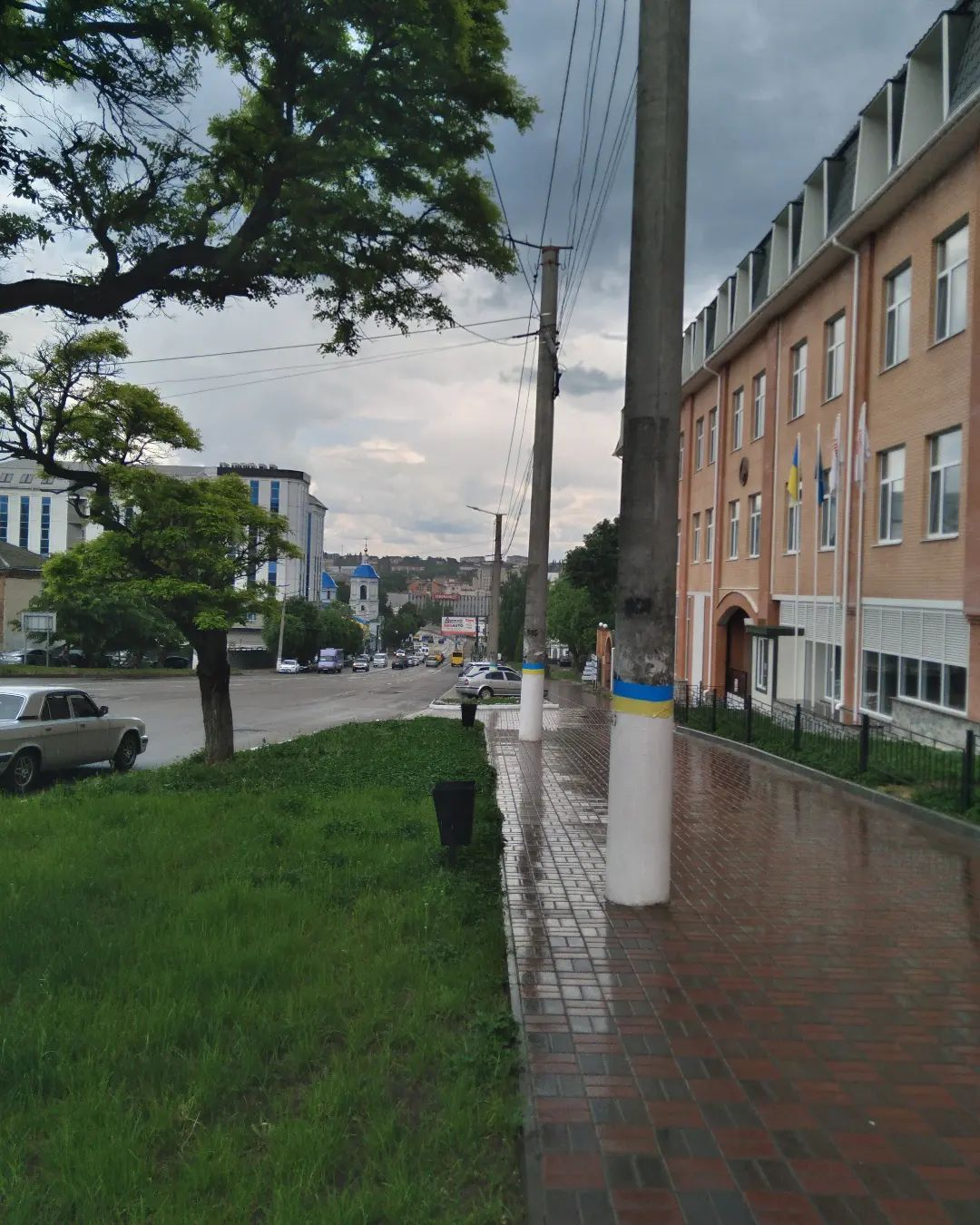
Panorama of the city, 2023

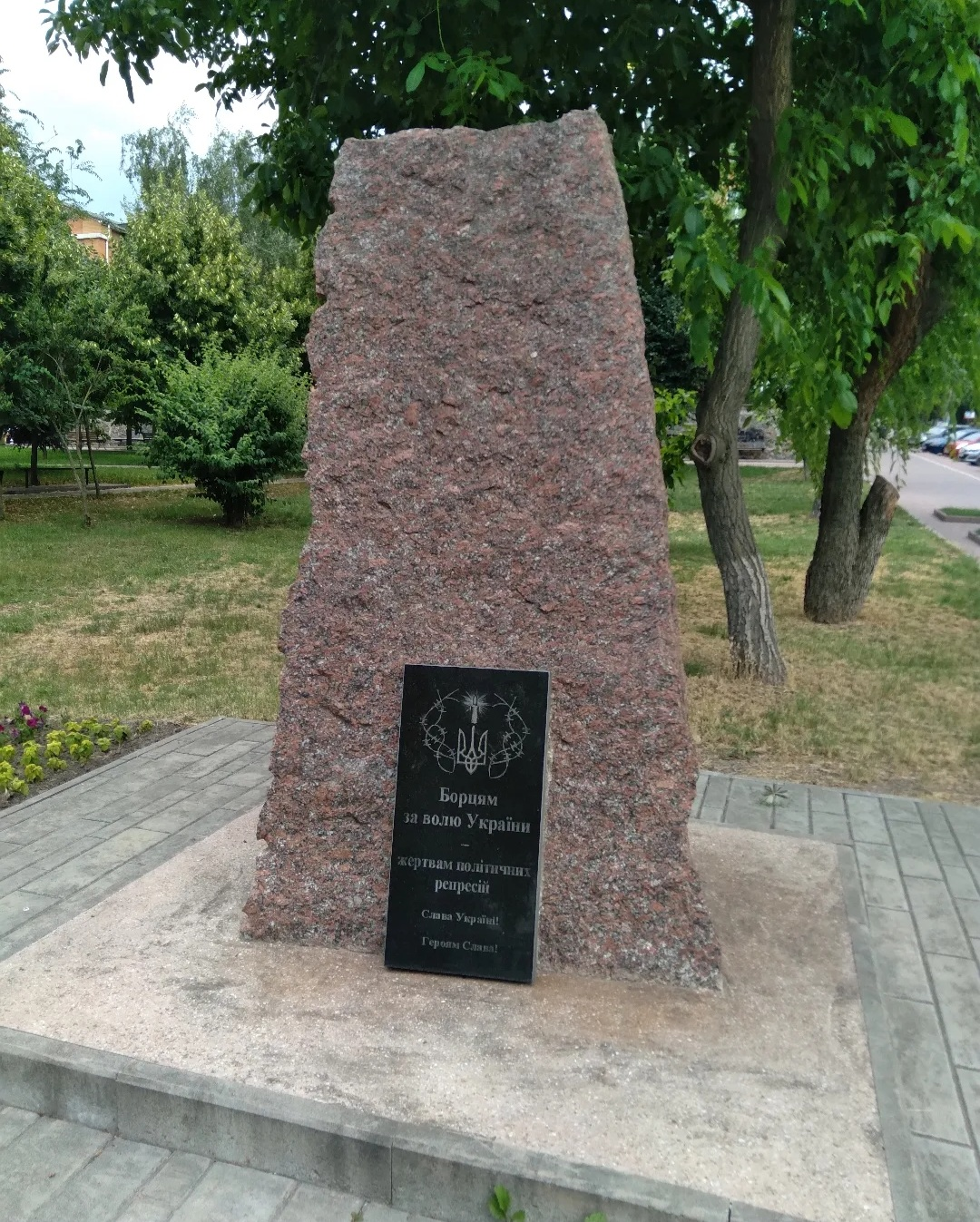
Monument to the victims of Soviet repressions

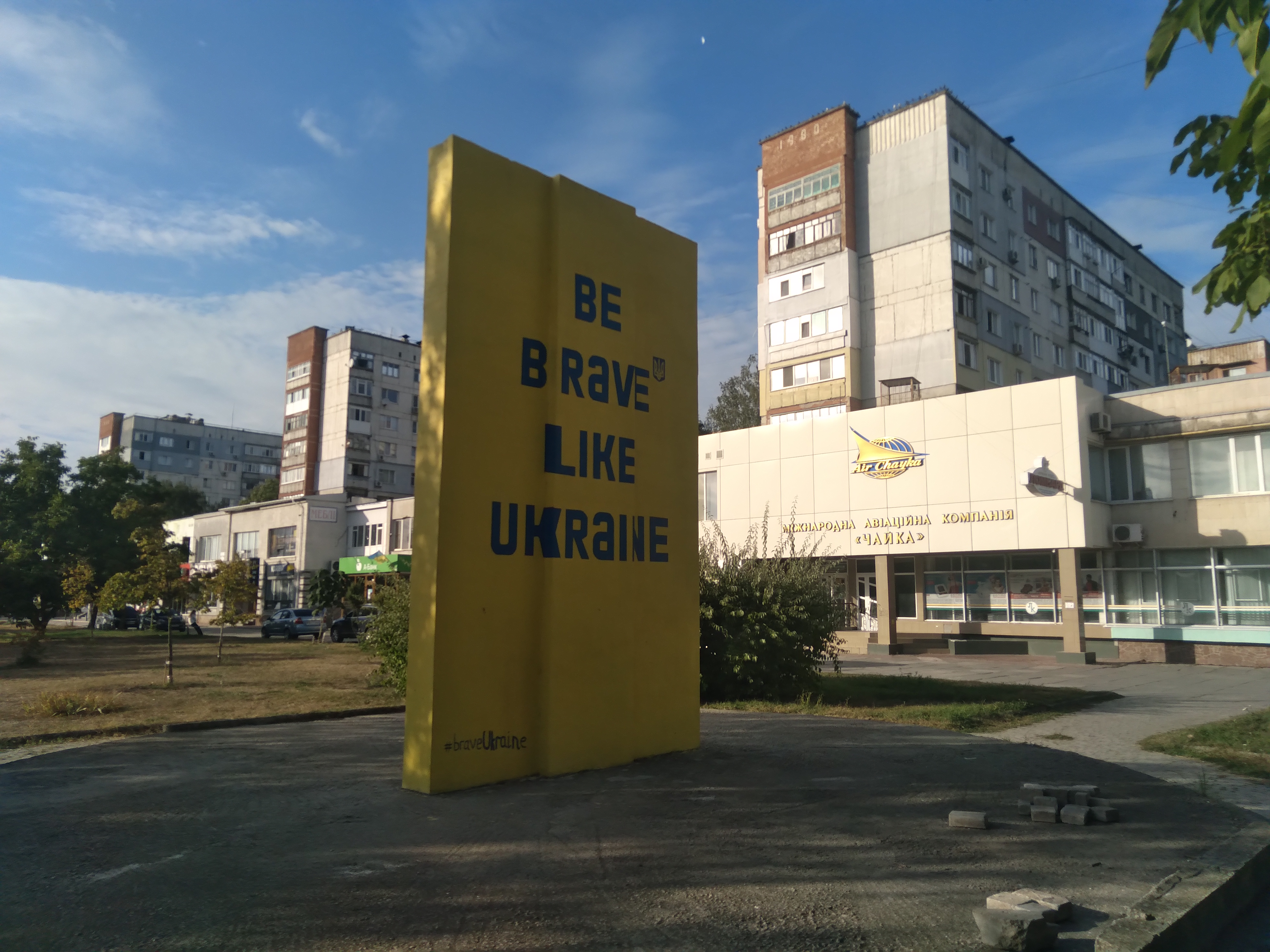
Memorial "Be brave like Ukraine"

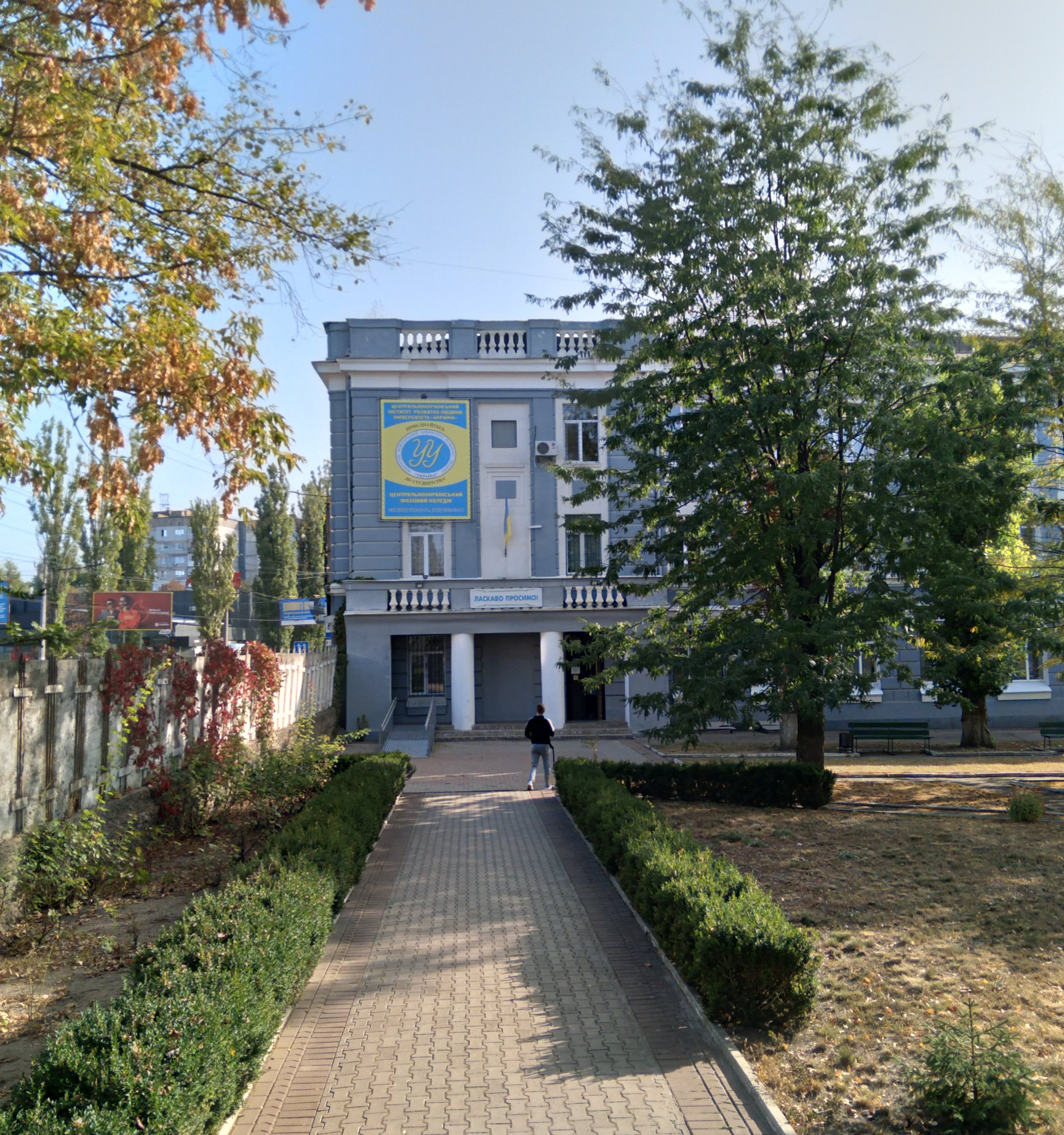
Central Ukrainian Institute of Human Development

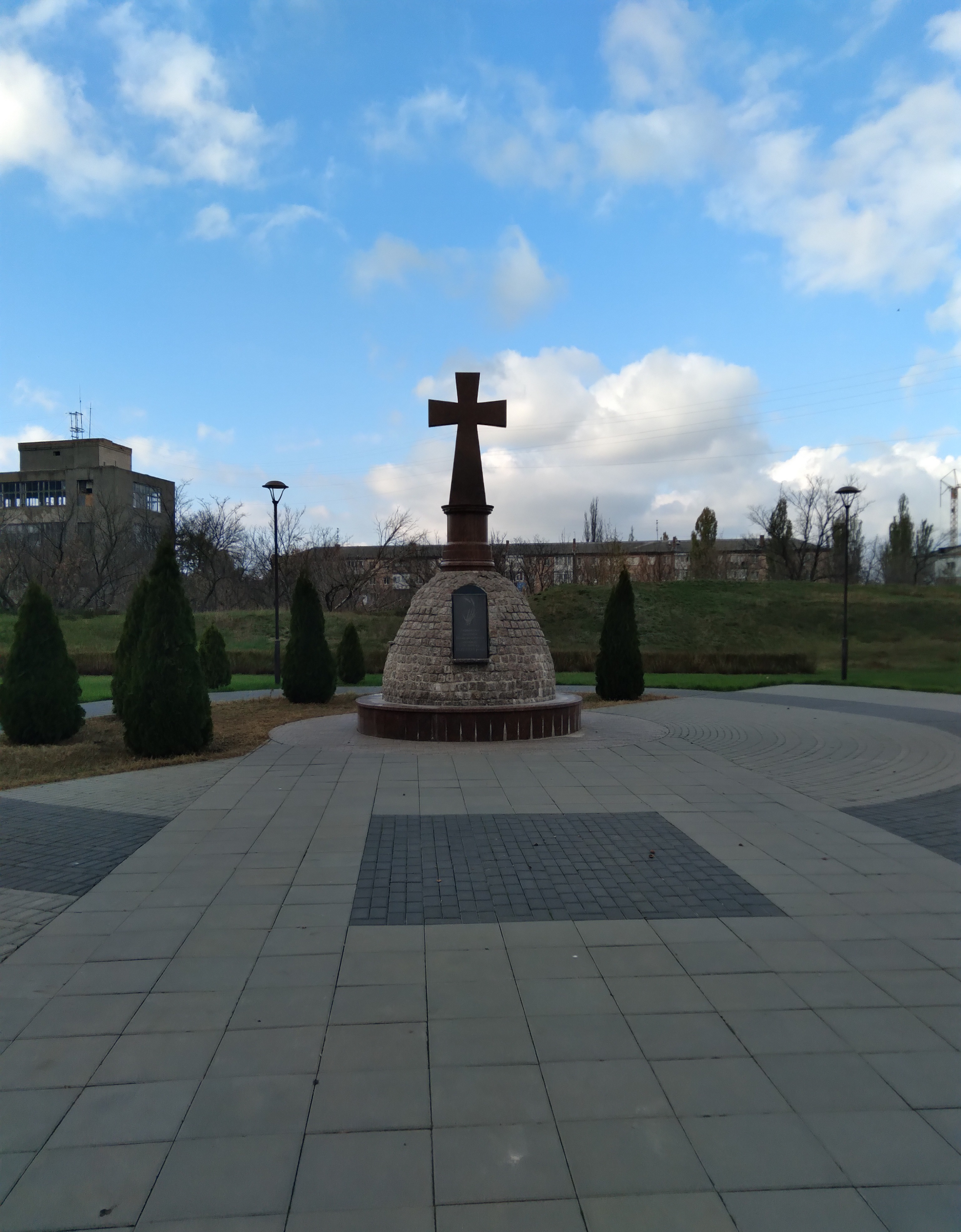
Monument to the victims of the Holodomor

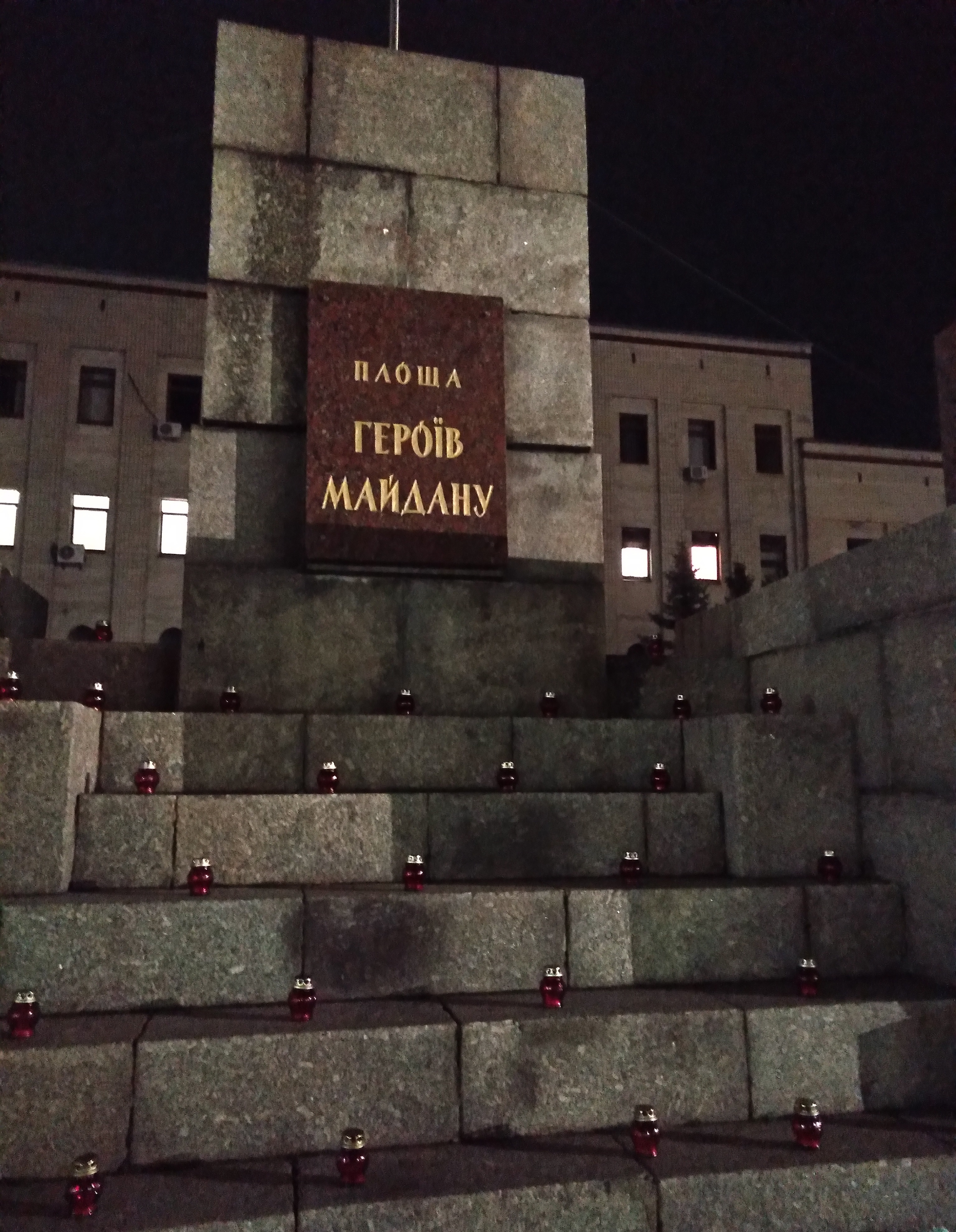
Monument to the heroes of Euromaidan

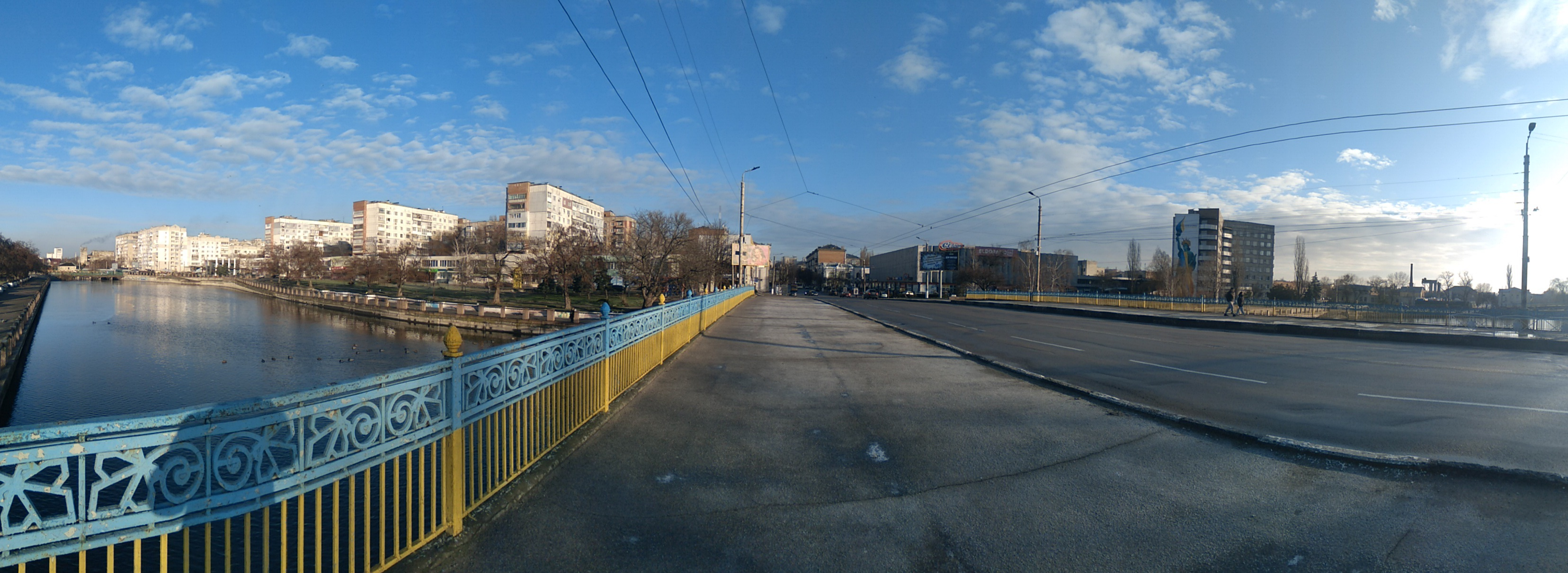
One of the bridges over Inhul

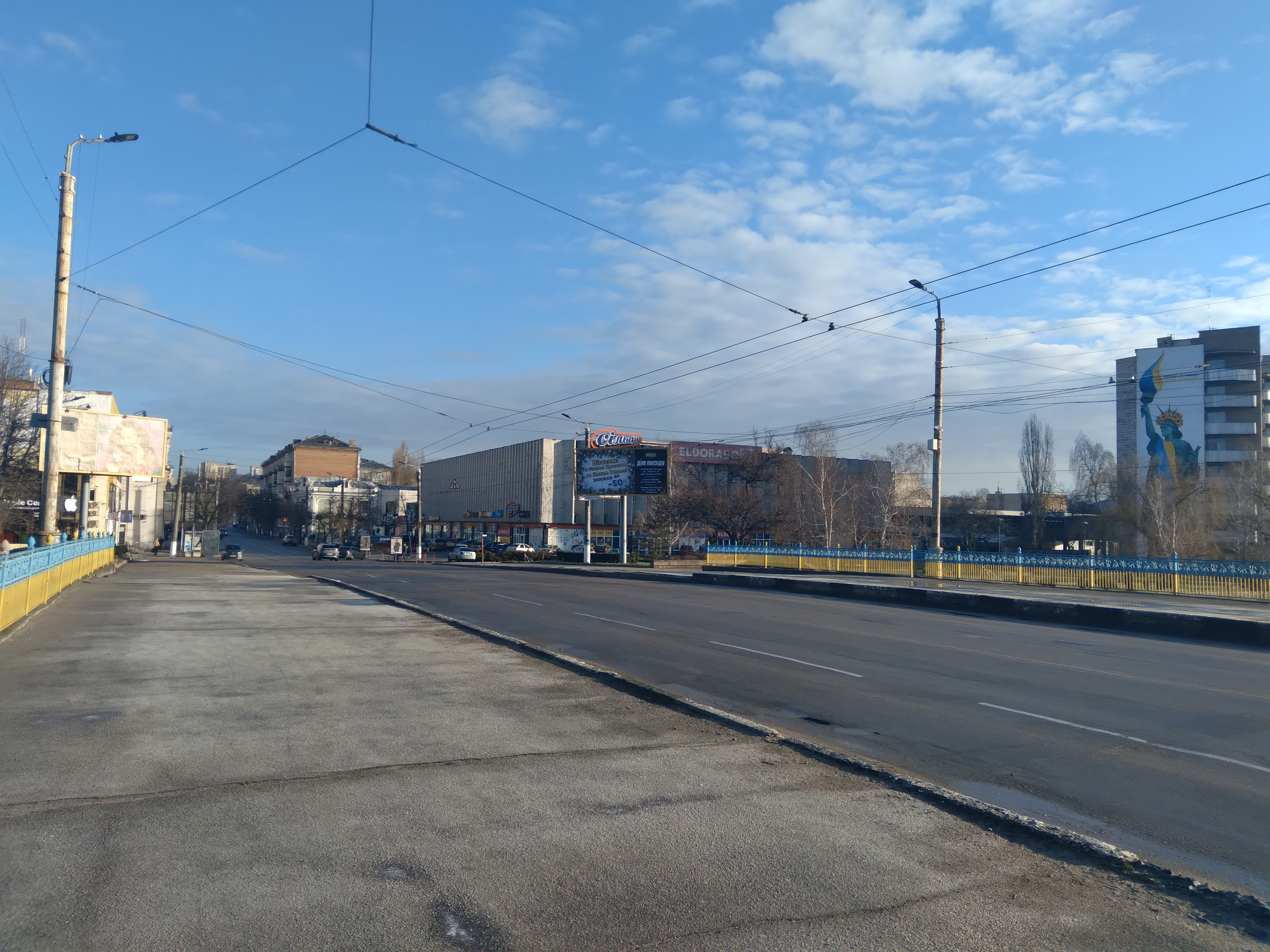
Main street (Velyka Perspektyvna)

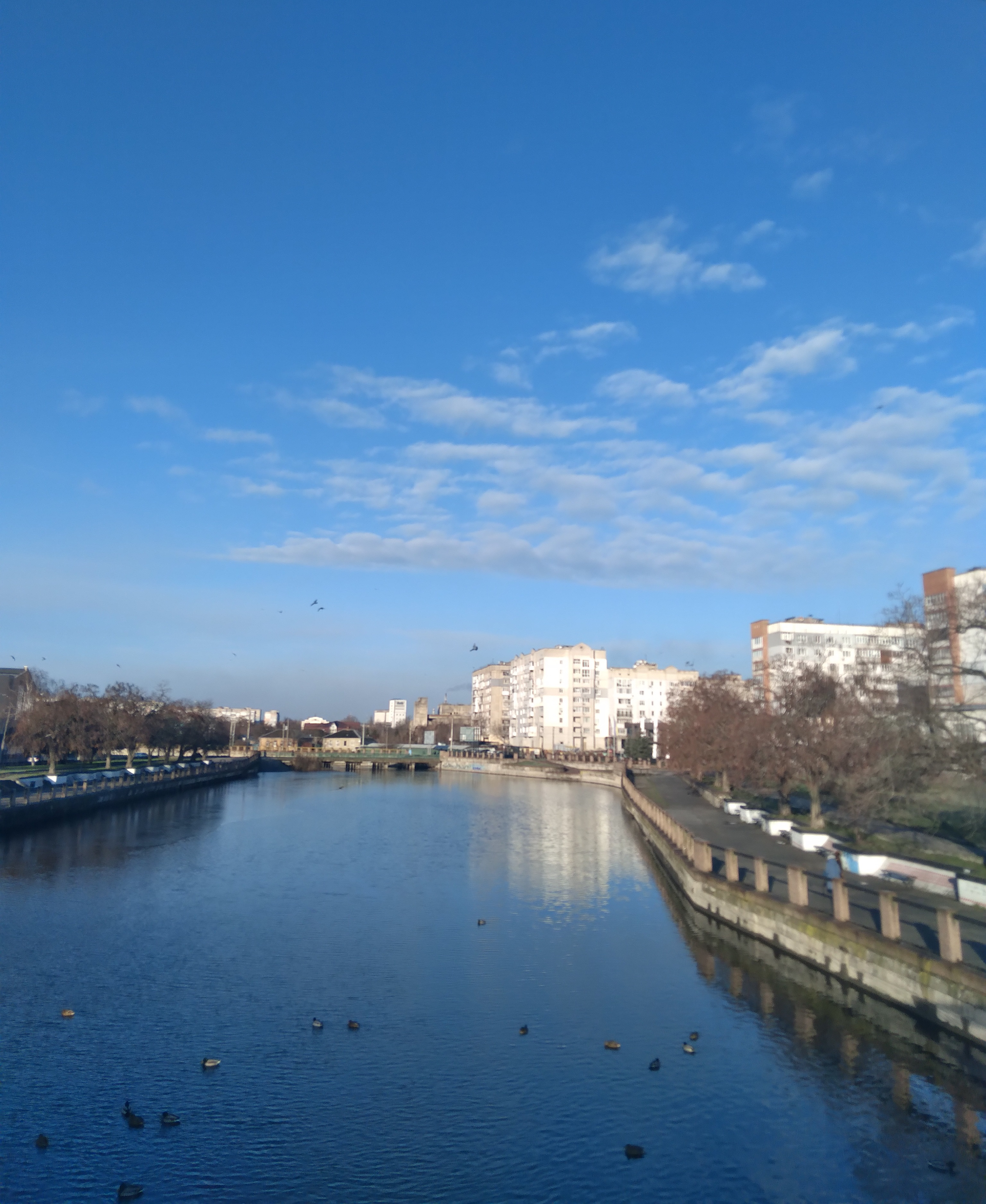
Inhul river

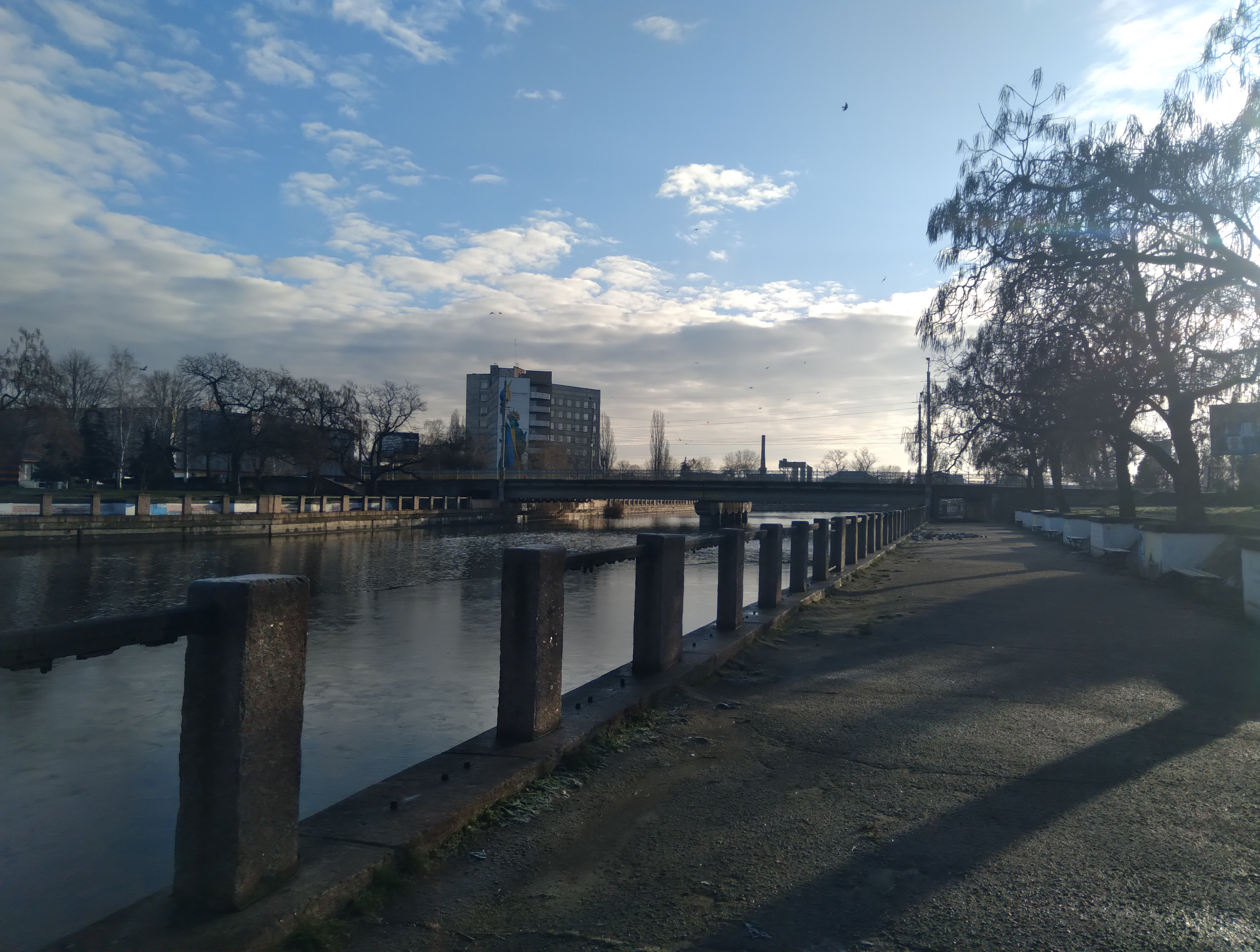
Embankment in the city center

== See also ==
- Creative Group
- Kropyvnytskyi Region Universal Research Library
- Remember about the Gas — Do not buy Russian goods!
- Yatran (typewriter)

== Sources ==
- Поліщук, Володимир (2022). Будівничі міста на берегах Інгулу (PDF) (in Ukrainian). Kropyvnytskyi: ВЦ ККТК.
- Пашутин, Александр Николаевич (1897). Исторический очерк г. Елисаветграда. Лито-Типографія Бр. Шполянскихъ.
- Даценко, B. (2014). Велика війна 1941-1945. Кіровоградський вимір. Імекс-ДТД.
- Михайлюк, М. В. (2010). Кіровоградщина і кіровоградці в роки Другої світової війни: Спогади, документи і матеріали. Кіровоградський інститут розвитку людини ВНЗ ВМУРоЛ «Україна».
