= List of longest rivers of Ukraine =

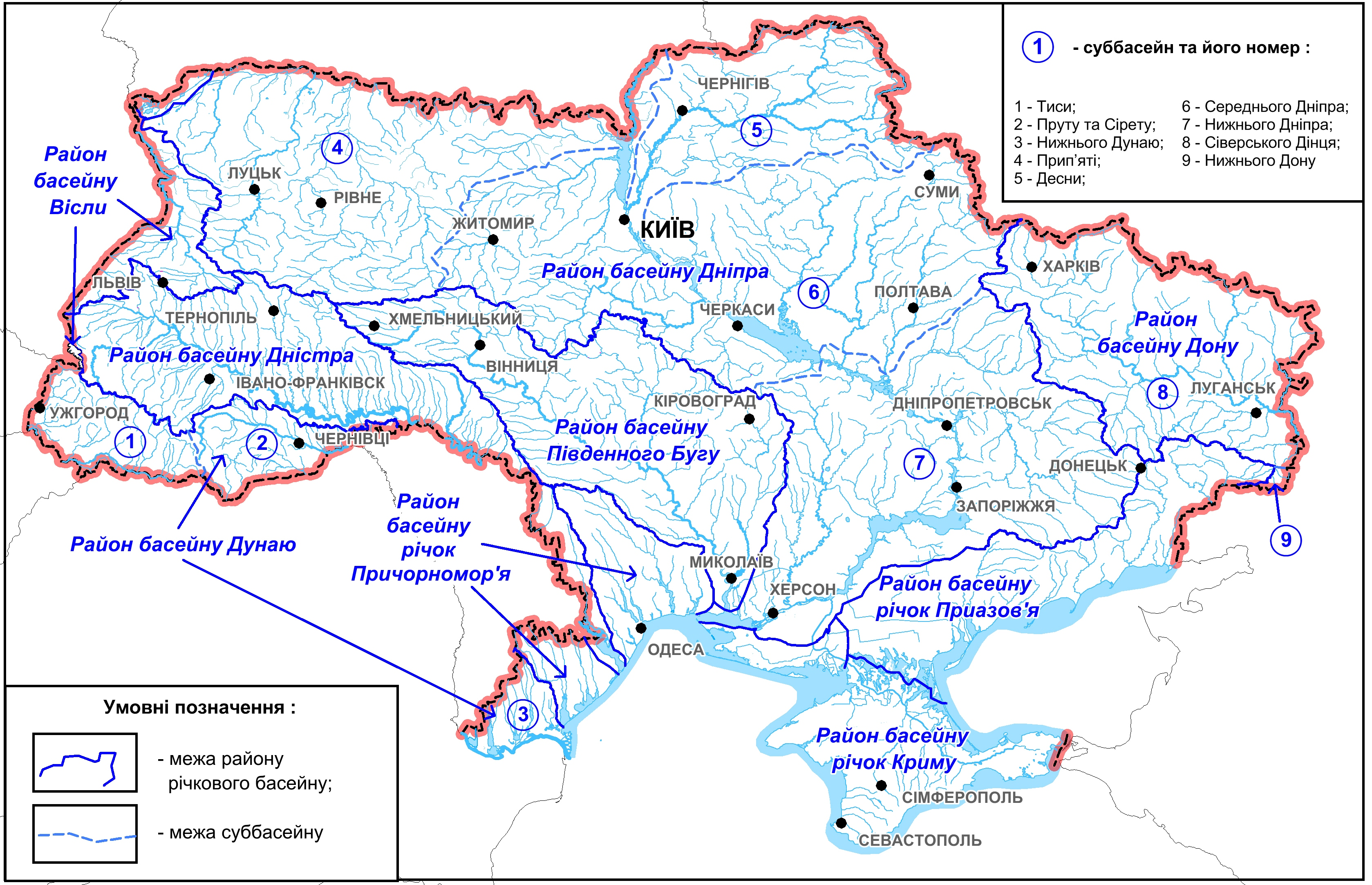
Hydrographic zoning in Ukraine

Ukraine has around 23,000 rivers, with most of the rivers draining into the Black Sea and Azov Sea and belonging to the larger Mediterranean basin. Those rivers mostly flow in a southerly direction, except for the Pripyat tributaries in Volhynia and Dniester tributaries in Prykarpattia. A few western Ukraine rivers drain to the north west through Poland to the Baltic Sea, as part of the Western Bug drainage basin. The most notable rivers of Ukraine include the Dnieper, Dniester, Southern Bug, and Siverskyi Donets. The longest river is the Dnieper, the longest tributary is the Dnieper's tributary Desna. Two of the Danube's tributaries in Ukraine, the Prut and the Tysa, are longer than the main river within Ukraine.

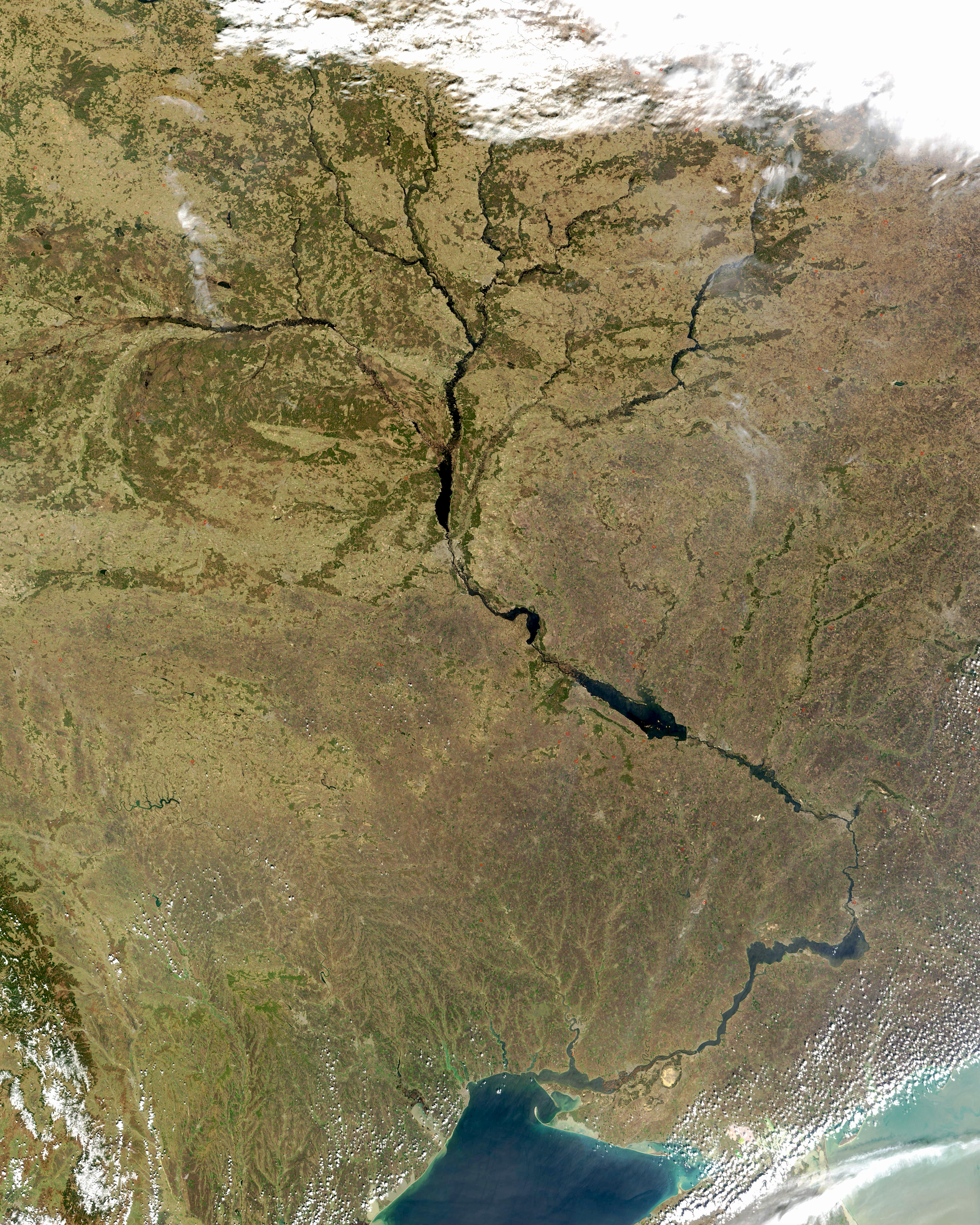
A NASA satellite image of the Dnieper and its tributaries

In 2013, in accordance with the Water Framework Directive, the territory of Ukraine has been divided into nine hydrographic zones according to major river basins, including the basins of the Vistula (Western Bug and San), Danube, Dniester, Southern Bug, Dnieper, Don, the rivers of the Black Sea littoral, the Sea of Azov littoral, and separately the rivers of Crimea. The biggest river basin by area is the Dnieper which is subdivided into the Pripyat basin, Desna basin, basin of Middle Dnieper, basin of Lower Dnieper. Beside Dnieper, basin of the Danube zoning is also subdivided into basin of Tysa, basin of Prut and Siret, and basin of the Lower Danube.

== List of major rivers in Ukraine ==
Listed are rivers over 150 km (93 mi) long.

Name	Name (Cyrillic)	Length / km (within Ukraine, including borders)	Length / km (total)	Drainage area / km^{2}	Basin
Dnieper	Дніпро	981	2201	291,400	Dnieper-Bug Estuary
Southern Bug	Південний Буг	806	806	63,700	Dnieper-Bug Estuary
Dniester	Дністер	705	1362	72,100	Black Sea
Siverskyi Donets	Сіверський Донець	672	1053	98,900	Don
Desna	Десна	591	1130	88,900	Dnieper
Horyn	Горинь	577	659	27,010	Pripyat
Inhulets	Інгулець	549	549	14,870	Dnieper
Psel	Псел	526	717	22,800	Dnieper
Sluch	Случ	451	451	13,800	Horyn
Styr	Стир	445	494	13,100	Pripyat
Western Bug	Західний Буг	401	831	73,500	Narew [Narva]
Teteriv	Тетерів	385	385	15,300	Dnieper
Sula	Сула	365	365	19,600	Dnieper
Inhul	Інгул	354	354	9,890	Southern Bug
Vorskla	Ворскла	348	464	14,700	Dnieper
Ros	Рось	346	346	12,600	Dnieper
Oril	Оріль	346	346	9,800	Dnieper
Udai	Удай	327	327	7,030	Sula
Vovcha	Вовча	323	323	13,300	Samara
Samara	Самара	320	320	22,600	Dnieper
Khorol	Хорол	308	308	3,870	Psel
Prut	Прут	272	967	27,500	Danube
Pripyat	Прип'ять	261	761	121,000	Dnieper
Uzh	Уж	256	256	8,080	Pripyat
Zbruch	Збруч	244	244	3,400	Dniester
Seret	Серет	242	242	3,900	Dniester
Stryi	Стрий	232	232	3,060	Dniester
Seim	Сейм	222	748	27,500	Desna
Aidar	Айдар	213	264	7,420	Siverskyi Donets
Kalmius	Кальміус	209	209	5,070	Sea of Azov
Salhir	Салгир	204	204	3,750	Syvash
Tysa	Тиса	201	966	11,300	Danube
Vysun	Висунь	201	201	2,670	Inhulets
Oster	Остер	199	201	2,950	Desna
Luhan	Лугань	198	198	3,740	Siverskyi Donets
Molochna	Молочна	197	197	3,450	Sea of Azov
Snov	Снов	190	253		Desna
Stokhid	Стохід	188	188	3,150	Pripyat
Turija	Турія	184	184	2,800	Pripyat
Oskil	Оскiл	177	472		Siverskyi Donets
Danube	Дунай	174	2900		Black Sea
Ubort	Уборть	171	292		Pripyat
Krynka	Кринка	170	180		Mius River
Smotrych	Смотрич	168	168	1,800	Dniester
Hirsky Tikych	Гірський Тікич	167	167	3,510	Hnylyi Tikych
Velyka Vys	Велика Вись	166	166	2,860	Synyukha
Murafa	Мурафа	163	163	2,410	Dniester
Irpin	Ірпінь	162	162	3,340	Dnieper
Tiasmyn	Тясмин	160	160	4,540	Dnieper
Bazavluk	Базавлук	157	157	4,200	Dnieper
Hnylyi Tikych	Гнилий Тікич	157	157	3,150	Synyukha
Ikva	Іква	156	156	2,250	Styr
Chychyklia	Чичиклія	156	156	2,120	Southern Bug
Tylihul	Тилігул	154	154	3,300	Black Sea
Derkul	Деркул	153	163		Siverskyi Donets
Velykyi Kuialnyk	Великий Куяльник	150	150	1,860	Black Sea
Stvyha	Ствига	66	178	5,440	Pripyat

Black Sea basin

- Dnieper's tributaries
- Southern Bug's tributaries
- Dniester's tributaries
- Danube's tributaries
- Black Sea estuaries' tributaries

Sea of Azov basin

- Siverskyi Donets' tributaries
- Kalmius's tributaries
- Salhir's tributaries
- Mius' tributaries

Baltic Sea basin

- Western Bug's tributaries

== Trivia ==
The most water in Ukraine is carried by Dnieper. Its annual drainage volume is 52.42 km^{3} (12.58 cu mi). The only other river that has higher drainage volume is the Danube which running through Central Europe within Ukraine stretches only for 174 km (108 mi). The average annual drainage of the Danube is around 123 km^{3} (30 cu mi).

The deepest river of Ukraine is Dniester. In its mid stream between Pyzhniv village and Mohyliv-Podilsky through the Dniester canyon (Podillia Upland) the river narrows to 1.5 km (0.93 mi) in width and deepens up to 10 m (33 ft).

The biggest water amount among distributaries is carried by the Chilia branch.

The biggest river delta in Ukraine belongs to Dnieper and has area of 350 km^{2} (140 sq mi), while the Danube Delta within Ukraine is only 120 km^{2} (46 sq mi).

== Gallery ==
Images of Ukrainian Rivers
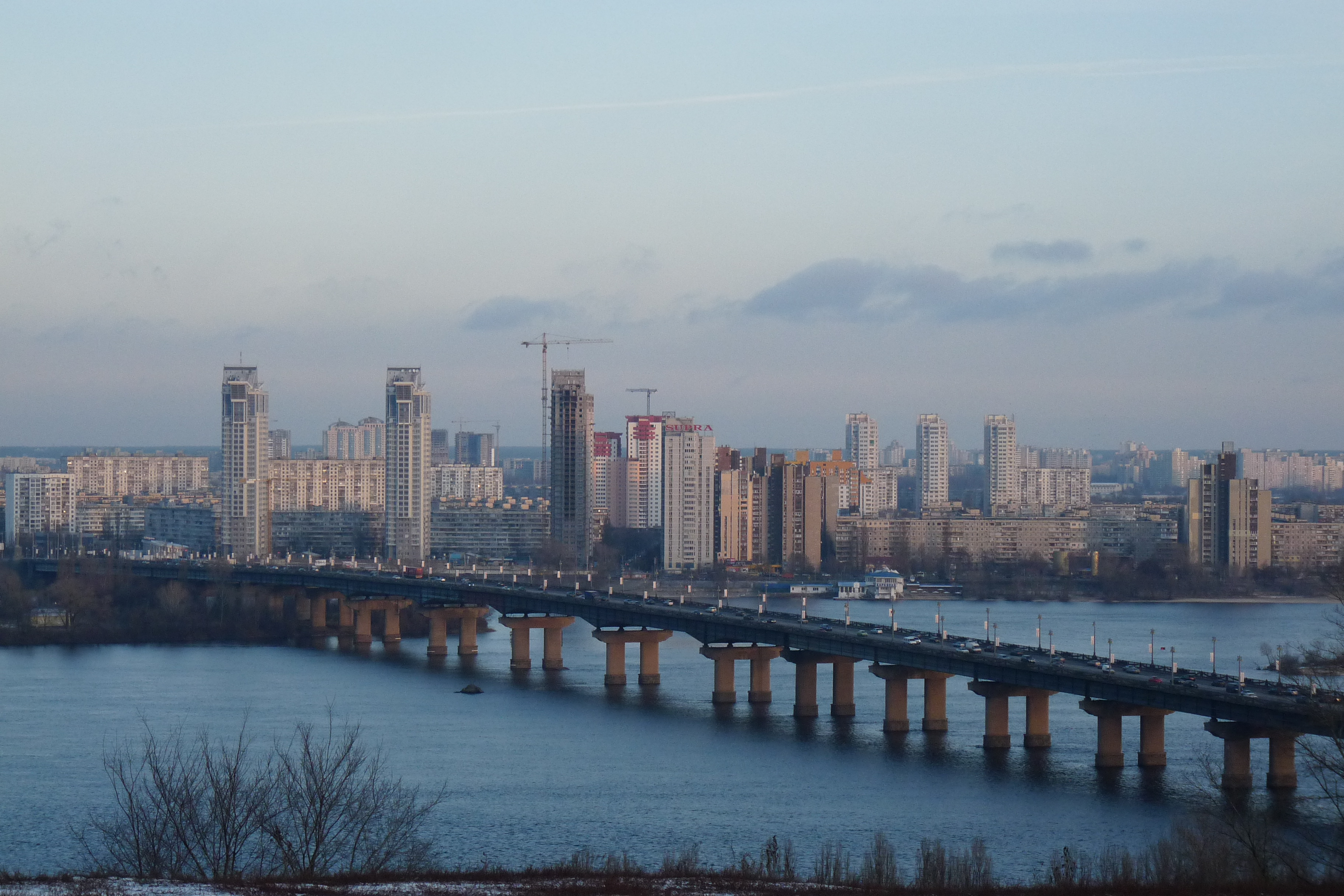
The Dnieper River passes through many cities — notably Kyiv, the capital of Ukraine. In Kyiv, more than seven bridges cross the river.

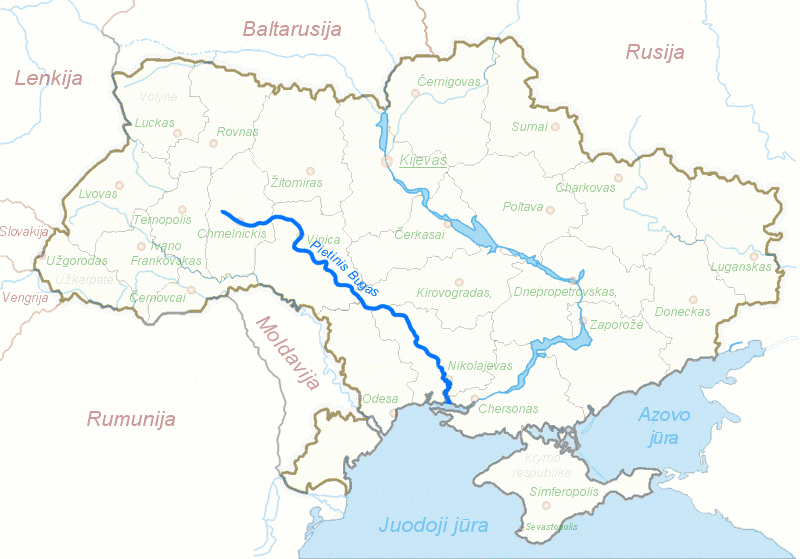
A map of the Southern Buh flowing through Ukraine (in Lithuanian).

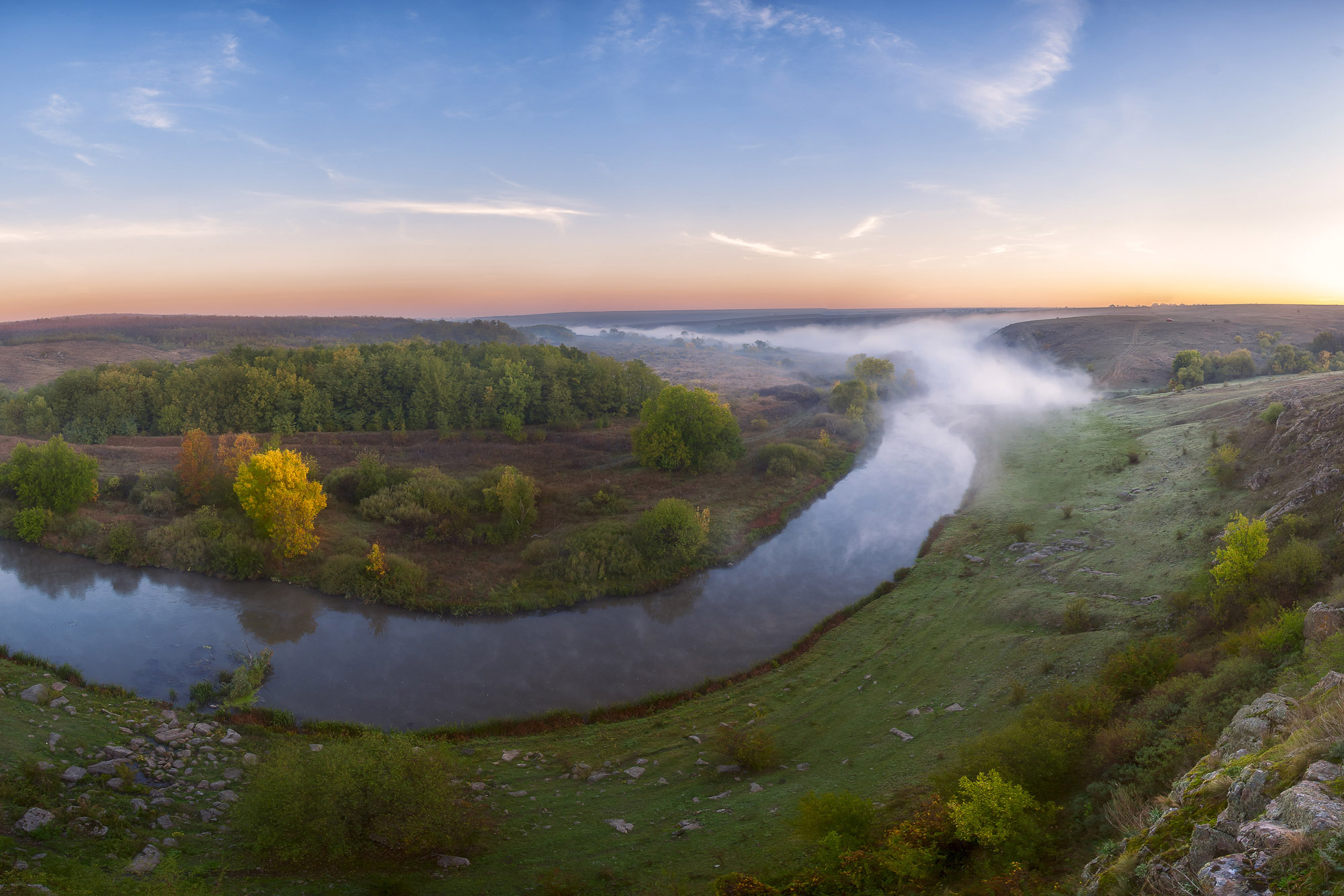
Kalmius river, Donetsk

== See also ==
- Waterfalls of Ukraine
- List of rivers of Europe
- Category:Rivers of Ukraine
