= Yatran =

Yatran (Ukrainian: Ятрань) may refer to:

- Yatran (river), river in Ukraine
- Yatran (village), village in Ukraine
- FC Yatran, Ukrainian woman's football club, currently based at Berestivets, previously FC Yatran Uman, Yatran-Basis, and Ятрань-Уманьферммаш
- Yatran (typewriter), typewriter manufactured in Ukraine
- Yatran Dance Ensemble, Ukraine, see Ukrainian dance
