= Uman–Botoșani offensive =

1944 Red Army offensive in western Ukraine during World War II

- Part of Dnieper–Carpathian offensive
- Soviet soldiers inspect a Panther tank, abandoned by the Germans in Uman in conditions of rasputitsa, 13 March 1944.
Date	5 March – 17 April 1944
Location	175-kilometre (109 mi) sector of the front between Uman and Kirovograd in western Ukraine, parts of Bessarabia, Bukovina
Result	Soviet victory

Belligerents
Soviet Union	Germany; Romania

Commanders and leaders
(Soviet Union) Ivan Konev (2nd Ukrainian Front)	(Nazi Germany) Erich von Manstein (Army Group South) (Nazi Germany) Otto Wöhler (8th Army) (Kingdom of Romania) Ioan Mihail Racoviță (4th Army)

Strength
(Soviet Union) 2nd Ukrainian Front on 1 March 1944: 691,097 men in total (ration strength); 480,279 men in combat and support units; 8,054 guns and mortars; 670 operational tanks and self-propelled guns; 325 tanks and self-propelled guns in repairs; 551 aircraft	(Nazi Germany) 8th Army; Manpower; 29 February 1944: 250,000 men in total 7 April 1944: 230,000 men in total; (reinforcements); 23 April 1944: 267,000 men in total; (reinforcements); AFV status 1 March 1944: 172 operational tanks and assault guns; 159 tanks and assault guns in short-term repair; 62 tanks and assault guns in long-term repair 27 March 1944: 37 operational tanks and assault guns; (most of the tanks lost irrevocably by this date); 11 April 1944: 111 operational tanks and assault guns; (reinforcements); 23 April 1944: 198 operational tanks and assault guns; (reinforcements) (Kingdom of Romania) 4th Army; Manpower; Start of April 1944: 200,000 men in total Start of May 1944: 300,000 men in total; (full mobilization); Equipment holdings at the start of May 1944: 10,243 machine-guns; 3,235 guns and mortars; 264 anti-aircraft guns; 1,344 anti-tank guns. Of them: 382 German 7.5 cm Pak 40 guns

Casualties and losses
(Soviet Union) March: 12,405 killed and missing; 38,702 wounded; 5,489 sick and frostbitten; 254 other non-combat losses; 56,850 in total; April: 15,896 killed and missing; 40,089 wounded; 8,072 sick and frostbitten; 294 other non-combat losses; 64,354 in total	(Nazi Germany) Exact unknown Wöhler report: 8th Army suffered heavy personnel losses and lost most of its motor vehicles, armoured vehicles and artillery during retreat to Romania. Guderian report: Approximately 300 German tanks irrevocably lost in the Uman area. (Kingdom of Romania) Unknown

The Uman–Botoșani offensive or Uman–Botoshany offensive (Russian: Уманско-ботошанская наступательная операция), known on the German side as the Defensive battle at Uman and retreat battles over the Bug and Dniester (German: Abwehrschlacht bei Uman und Rückzugskämpfe über Bug und Dnestr), was a part of the Dnieper–Carpathian offensive, carried out by the Red Army in the western Ukrainian Soviet Socialist Republic against the German 8th Army of Army Group South during World War II. Led by Marshal of the Soviet Union Ivan Konev, it became one of the most successful Red Army operations of the whole war. In over a month of combat through the deep spring mud and numerous water barriers, the 2nd Ukrainian Front advanced over 300 kilometres (190 mi), cleared German forces from southwestern Ukraine, and entered Romania and Moldova.

This offensive, alongside Marshal Georgy Zhukov's great slicing blow, split the Wehrmacht's Army Group South into two parts, north and south of the Carpathian Mountains. The northern portion was pushed back into Galicia in Poland, while the southern portion was pushed back into Romania. On 5 April 1944, the northern portion was renamed Army Group North Ukraine, while the southern portion became Army Group South Ukraine, although very little of Ukraine remained in German hands.

As a result of this split, the Soviets had cut the main supply lifeline of Army Group South, the Lviv–Odessa railway. Now, the southern group of German forces would have to use the long roundabout route through the Balkans, with all of the supplies being rerouted over the Romanian railroads, which were in poor condition.

For the Wehrmacht's defeat, the commander of Army Group South, Erich von Manstein, and the commander of Army Group A, Ewald von Kleist, were dismissed by Adolf Hitler and replaced by Walter Model and Ferdinand Schörner, respectively.

In the course of the operation, 10 German divisions were either destroyed or left with only remnants of their troops. In order to save its southern sector from complete collapse, the German high command was forced to transfer seven divisions from the neighboring German 6th Army in the south to the disintegrating front of the 8th Army, while also mobilizing the Romanian 4th Army, which consisted of eight divisions and one brigade, with another seven Romanian divisions and two Romanian brigades being incorporated directly into the German 8th Army.

This was the only operation in which the Red Army crossed six major rivers – the Gornyi Tikich, the Southern Bug, the Dniester, the Răut, the Prut, and the Siret – one after another.

== Operational scope and goals ==
The operation was conducted by the forces of 2nd Ukrainian Front from 5 March to 17 April 1944. The purpose of the operation was to inflict a crushing defeat on the German "Uman group", split the troops of Army Group South, and capture southwestern Ukraine. After the completion of the Korsun–Shevchenkovsky offensive, the main forces of 2nd Ukrainian Front (Marshal Konev) were opposed by the 8th Army of Army Group South (Generalfeldmarschall Erich von Manstein). At the start of the operation, Soviet troops had achieved a 1.5-to-1 numerical superiority in personnel and armor and 2.5-to-1 in artillery, while maintaining parity in aviation forces against their German adversaries.

== Planning ==
The Stavka concept of the operation was to destroy the 8th Army, bisect the front of Army Group South, and cut off withdrawal routes of the 1st Panzer Army in the southern direction, contributing to 1st Ukrainian Front's objective of its defeat.

The main offensive effort was to be delivered from the staging areas at Vinograd, Zvenyhorodka, and Shpola in the direction of Uman by forces of the 27th, 52nd, 4th Guards Combined Arms Armies, 2nd, 5th Guards and 6th Tank Armies (415 tanks and 147 SPAs), supported by the 5th Air Army. The 7th and 5th Guards Armies delivered supporting attacks from the region of Kirovograd in the direction of Novoukrainka. During preparation for the operation, the military councils of the Front and armies gave considerable attention the mobilisation of personnel and unit composition for overcoming of the difficulties due to rasputitsa, the generally poor weather conditions, and the need for conducting numerous assault river crossings that were expected to hinder operational mobility.

== The offensive ==
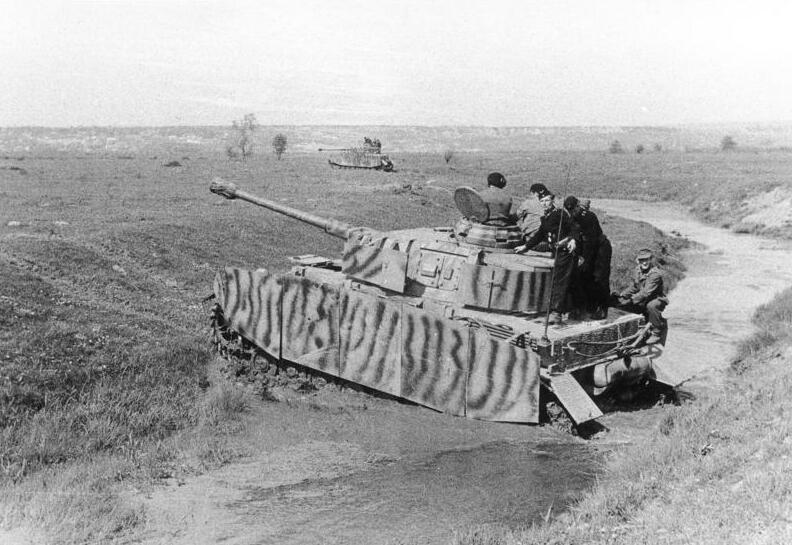
Panzer IVs in Ukraine, January 1944

The operation began on 5 March on a 175-kilometre (109 mi) sector of the front between Dnipropetrovsk (Dnepropetrovsk) and Bila Tserkva (Belaya Tserkov) after a powerful artillery barrage and developed successfully. In order to increase the force of impact and develop the offensive in the main direction, the 2nd and 5th Guards Tank Armies were introduced into the offensive on the first day. Already on the third day of the offensive, they conducted a river crossing of Hirsky Tikych (Gorny Tikach River) without pausing, overcame the last defensive line manned by German troops on the way to the Southern Bug river, and began to pursue the retreating German forces. The 6th Tank Army advanced following the 2nd and 5th Guard Tank armies. After Uman was taken on 10 March, the advance detachments of the armies reached Southern Bug. Crossing the river was accomplished on a 100-kilometre (62 mi) front, again, without pausing, via seized crossings, and also on pontoon bridges, boats and other improvised means.

In order to maintain a high rate of advance during the offensive, the Soviet 6th Tank Army was introduced after the Southern Bug crossing. At this point, the tank armies continued to advance towards the Dniester. On 17 March, advance units of the right wing of the Front took bridgeheads on the right bank south of Mohyliv-Podilsky (Mogilev-Podolskiy) area.

Soviet units had then entered the territory of Romania. As a result of the offensive, the 1st and 2nd Ukrainian Fronts, split the German Army Group South in two. The 8th German Army was cut off from the 1st Panzer Army and was assigned to Army Group A. The main effort of the 2nd Ukrainian Front was now transferred against this army group, which Soviet troops deeply enveloped from the south. An opportunity arose for the 2nd Ukrainian Front to attack in the southern direction to cut off withdrawal routes of the German army group beyond the Dniester and destroy it in cooperation with the 3rd Ukrainian Front.

Map of the offensive

The 40th Army of the 2nd Ukrainian Front, that advanced along the east bank of the Dniester, was given the task of cutting off withdrawal routes to the south to the 1st Panzer Army, by collaborating with troops of the 1st Ukrainian Front in eliminating 1st Ukrainian Front encirclement of German troops at Kamianets-Podilskyi (Kamenets-Podolsk) (see Proskurov–Chernovtsy offensive operation). Deflecting an attempted German counter-attack at Khotyn, they pressed home the attack from the bridgehead to Dniester, the 27th and 52nd armies together with detachments of the 2nd and 6th tank armies advanced to the river Prut, and on 26 March reached the State border of the USSR on an 85 kilometres (53 mi) front north of Ungheni (Ungen).

On the night of 28 March the Front's forces, while pursuing the retreating enemy, conducted another assault river crossing on the move of river Prut, transferring combat actions onto Romanian territory. Towards the middle of April, their right wing reached the Carpathian Mountains, after taking Botoșani (Botoshany), and with the central forces they approached Iași (Jassy) from the north while the left wing advanced to the approaches to Chișinău (Kishinev).

Hoping to save the southern wing of its front from complete disintegration, the German command moved 18 divisions and 3 brigades, its last strategic reserve in the southern sector, to this part of the front. Troops of the 2nd Ukrainian Front, encountering increasing resistance, in the middle of April was forced to go on the defensive at the reached positions of Dubăsari (Dubossary), north of Iași, and some 60-kilometre (37 mi) south of Botoșani.

== Outcome ==
As a result of the Uman–Botoshany offensive, Army Group South was split in two. The northern portion was regrouped as Army Group North Ukraine and placed under the command of Field Marshal Walter Model. The southern portion became Army Group South Ukraine under command of General Ferdinand Schörner. Ten Axis divisions suffered 50–75% losses in personnel, and much of their heavy equipment was lost on the retreat. In the course of the offensive, Soviet forces advanced some 200 to 250 kilometres (120 to 160 mi), taking significant parts of western Ukraine and Moldavia, and entered northeastern regions of Romania.

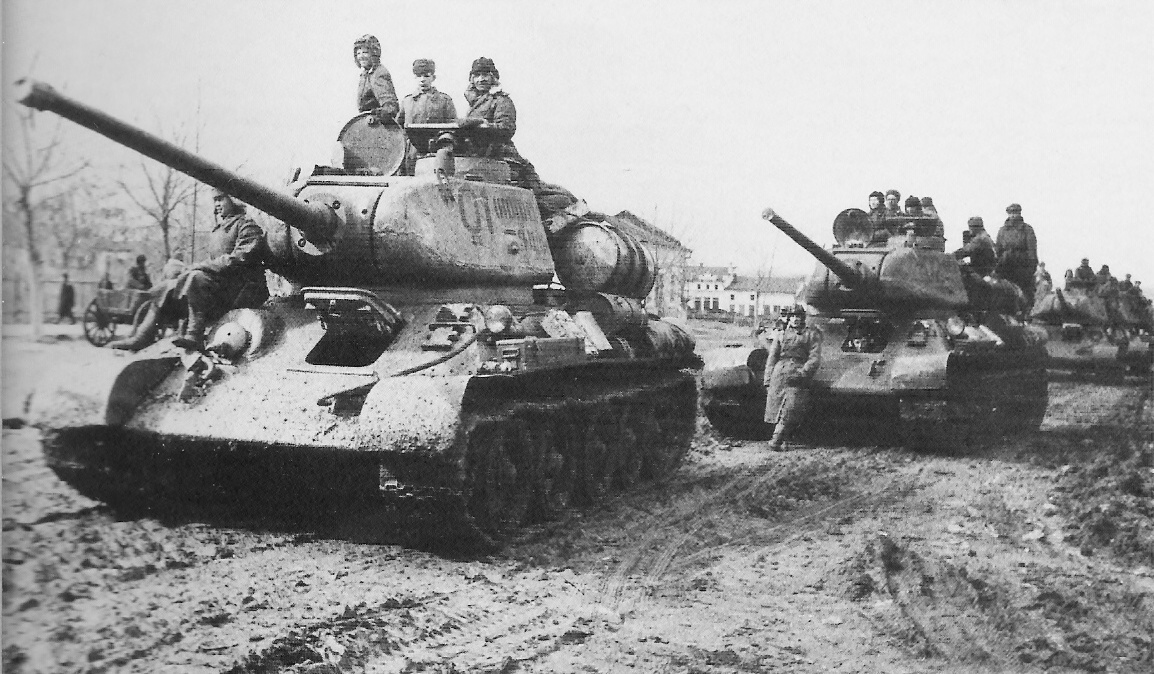
Soviet T-34/85s pause during an advance, 1944

The Soviet advance was stopped with the Battle of Târgu Frumos, which stabilized the region until August, when the Soviets renewed their efforts with the Jassy–Kishinev offensive and resumed their drive to the west.

During the offensive, the towns of Uman, Vapniarka, Pervomaisk, Novoukrainka were liberated. The offensive was the first in which three tank armies were used simultaneously as the main breakthrough force on a narrow sector of the front, all while being conducted under the conditions of spring floods and rasputitsa ("roadlessness"). Soviet units had moreover conducted consecutive assault crossings over six major rivers without pausing fully at any of them: Gorniy Tikach, Southern Bug, Dniester, Răut, Prut, and Siret, harassing and on occasion routing the German withdrawal from eastern and central Ukraine.

== Analysis ==
The operation demonstrated increased mobility of Soviet arms, and a clear desire to drive deep into enemy rear areas to create disruption and envelopment of German forces. The operation was characterised by flexible control, the quick response of command to changes in the situation and by the clear organisation of cooperation between the armies and the aviation of a front. Soviet troops showed they had gained a high degree of military skill in the conduct of operations, particularly in assault river crossings.
