= Tikych =

- Native name: Тікич (Ukrainian)

Location
- Country: Ukraine

Physical characteristics
- Mouth: Syniukha
  - coordinates: 48.7464°N 30.8892°E
- Length: 4 km (2.5 mi)

Basin features
- Progression: Syniukha→ Southern Bug→ Dnieper–Bug estuary→ Black Sea

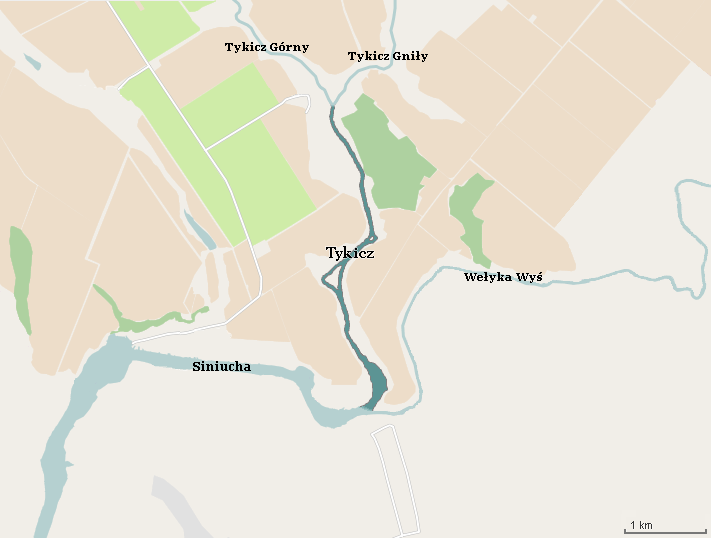
Map of the Tikych River.

The Tikych (Ukrainian: Тікич) is a short river in Cherkasy Oblast, Ukraine, only 4 kilometres (2.5 mi) long. It is formed by the confluence of the Hnyly Tikych and Hirsky Tikych rivers. The Tikych flows to its confluence with the Velyka Vys at Skaleva (Holovanivsk Raion), forming the Syniukha. The Syniukha then flows 110 kilometres (68 mi) to the Southern Bug.
