= Hnylyi Tikych =

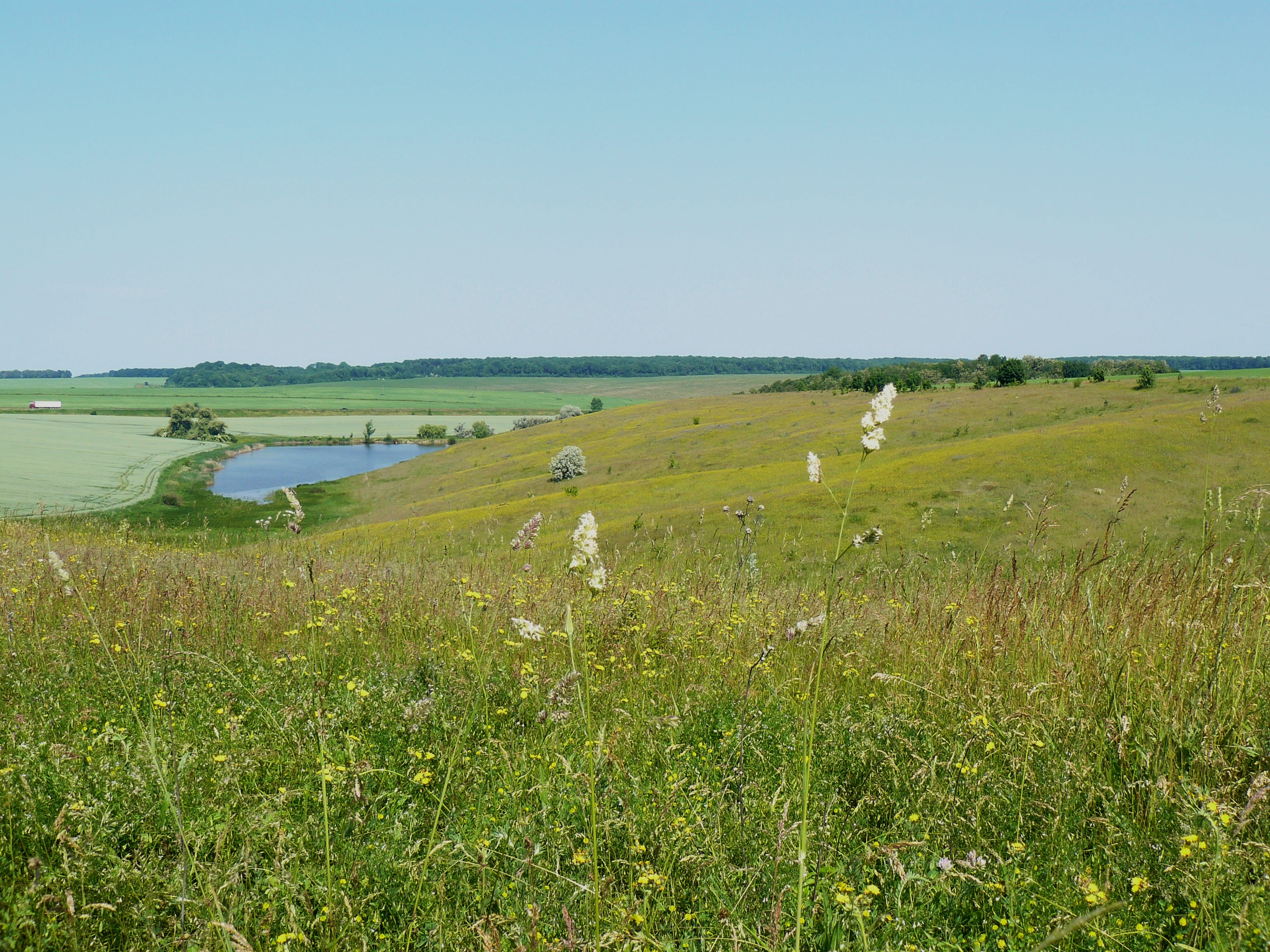

Location
- Country: Ukraine

Physical characteristics
- Source
  - location: Bila Tserkva Raion, Kyiv Oblast
- Mouth: Tikych
  - coordinates: 48°46′51″N 30°52′59″E
- Length: 157 km (98 mi)
- Basin size: 3,150 km^{2} (1,220 sq mi)

Basin features
- Progression: Tikych→ Syniukha→ Southern Bug→ Dnieper–Bug estuary→ Black Sea

The Hnylyi Tikych (Ukrainian: Гнилий Тікич), also known as Gniloy Tikich River, is a river in Ukraine, 157 km in length, a tributary of the Tikych, in the basin of Southern Bug. The Hnylyi Tikych river finds its source near the village of Snizhky in Bila Tserkva Raion, Kyiv Oblast.

It joins the Hirskyi Tikych river to form the Tikych River, which soon (after just 4 kilometres (2.5 mi)) joins the Velyka Vys river to form the Syniukha river, which flows 110 kilometres (68 mi) to join the Southern Bug.

It was in the middle of the Battle of Korsun–Cherkassy, during World War II in February 1944.
