= Wilhelm Stemmermann =

German general (1888–1944)

- Born: 23 October 1888; Rastatt, German Empire
- Died: 17 February 1944 (aged 55); Cherkassy, Ukrainian SSR, Soviet Union
- Military career
- Allegiance: German Empire; Weimar Republic; Nazi Germany
- Branch: German Army
- Service years: 1908–1944
- Rank: General der Artillerie
- Commands: XI Army Corps
- Conflicts: World War II; Invasion of Poland; Battle of France; Operation Barbarossa; Dnieper–Carpathian offensive; Battle of Korsun–Cherkassy †
- Awards: Knight's Cross of the Iron Cross with Oak Leaves

Wilhelm Stemmermann (23 October 1888 – 18 February 1944) was a German general in the Wehrmacht of Nazi Germany during World War II who commanded the XI Army Corps. He was a recipient of the Knight's Cross of the Iron Cross with Oak Leaves. He was killed on 17 February 1944 while attempting to break out of the Korsun–Cherkassy Pocket. He was posthumously awarded the Oak Leaves to his Knight's Cross.

== Awards and decorations ==
- Clasp to the Iron Cross (1939) 2nd Class (12 September 1939) & 1st Class (23 September 1939)
- German Cross in Gold on 11 January 1942 as Generalleutnant and commander of the 296. Infanterie-Division
- Knight's Cross of the Iron Cross with Oak Leaves
  - Knight's Cross on 7 February 1944 as General der Artillerie and commander of XI. Armeekorps
  - Oak Leaves on 18 February 1944 as General der Artillerie and commander of XI. Armeekorps

Military offices
Preceded by None	Commander of 296. Infanterie-Division; 5 February 1940 – 1 January 1942	Succeeded by Generalleutnant Friedrich Krischer Edler von Wehregg
Preceded by General der Panzertruppe Erhard Raus	Commander of XI. Armeekorps; 5 December 1943 – 18 February 1944	Succeeded by General der Infanterie Rudolf von Bünau
