= Yatran (typewriter) =

Typewriter manufactured in the Ukrainian SSR

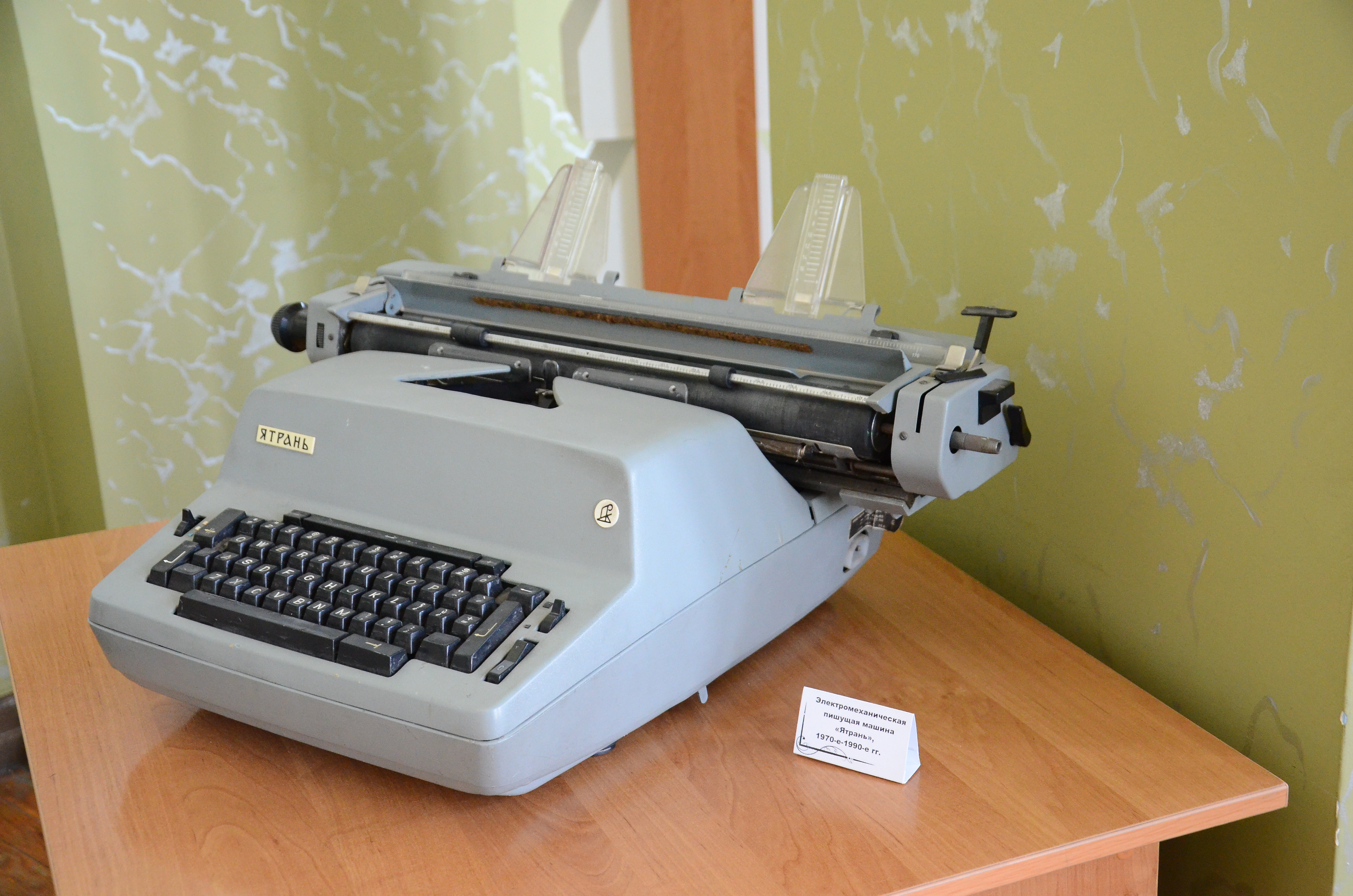
Yatran typewriter

Yatran (Russian: Ятрань) was an electromechanical typewriter manufactured in the Soviet Union at the Kirovograd Typewriter Plant (Production Association Pishmash, Пишмаш (Note: The abbreviation "Pishmash" for "пишущая машинка", 'typewriter', was also used for the names of several other Soviet typewriter plants.)), Ukrainian SSR. It was named after the nearby Yatran River. It was a licensed clone of German typewriter Olympia SGE. This typewriter was manufactured with keyboards in other languages of the Soviet Union: Latvian, Lithuanian, Estonian, Ukrainian, Kazakh, etc., as well as with the Braille keyboard for visually impaired people (model МПЭС-1М).
