= Hirskyi Tikych =

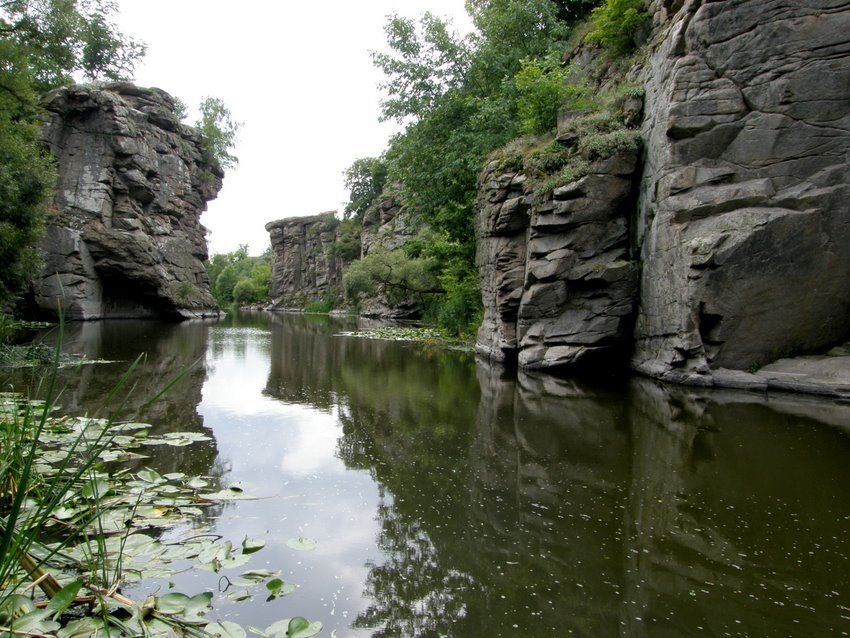
- Buky Canyon

Location
- Country: Ukraine

Physical characteristics
- Source
  - location: Vinnytsia Oblast
- Mouth: Tikych
  - coordinates: 48°46′51″N 30°52′59″E
- Length: 167 km (104 mi)
- Basin size: 3,510 km^{2} (1,360 sq mi)

Basin features
- Progression: Tikych→ Syniukha→ Southern Bug→ Dnieper–Bug estuary→ Black Sea

The Hirskyi Tikych (Ukrainian: Гірський Тікич) is a river in Ukraine, 167 km in length, a tributary of the Tikych, in the basin of Southern Bug. The Hirskyi Tikych river finds its source near the village of Frontivka in Orativ Raion, Vinnytsia Oblast. It joins the 157 km long Hnylyi Tikych to form the Tikych, which soon joins the Velyka Vys river to form the Syniukha river, which flows 110 km to join the Southern Bug.
