= Syniukha =

Syniukha River
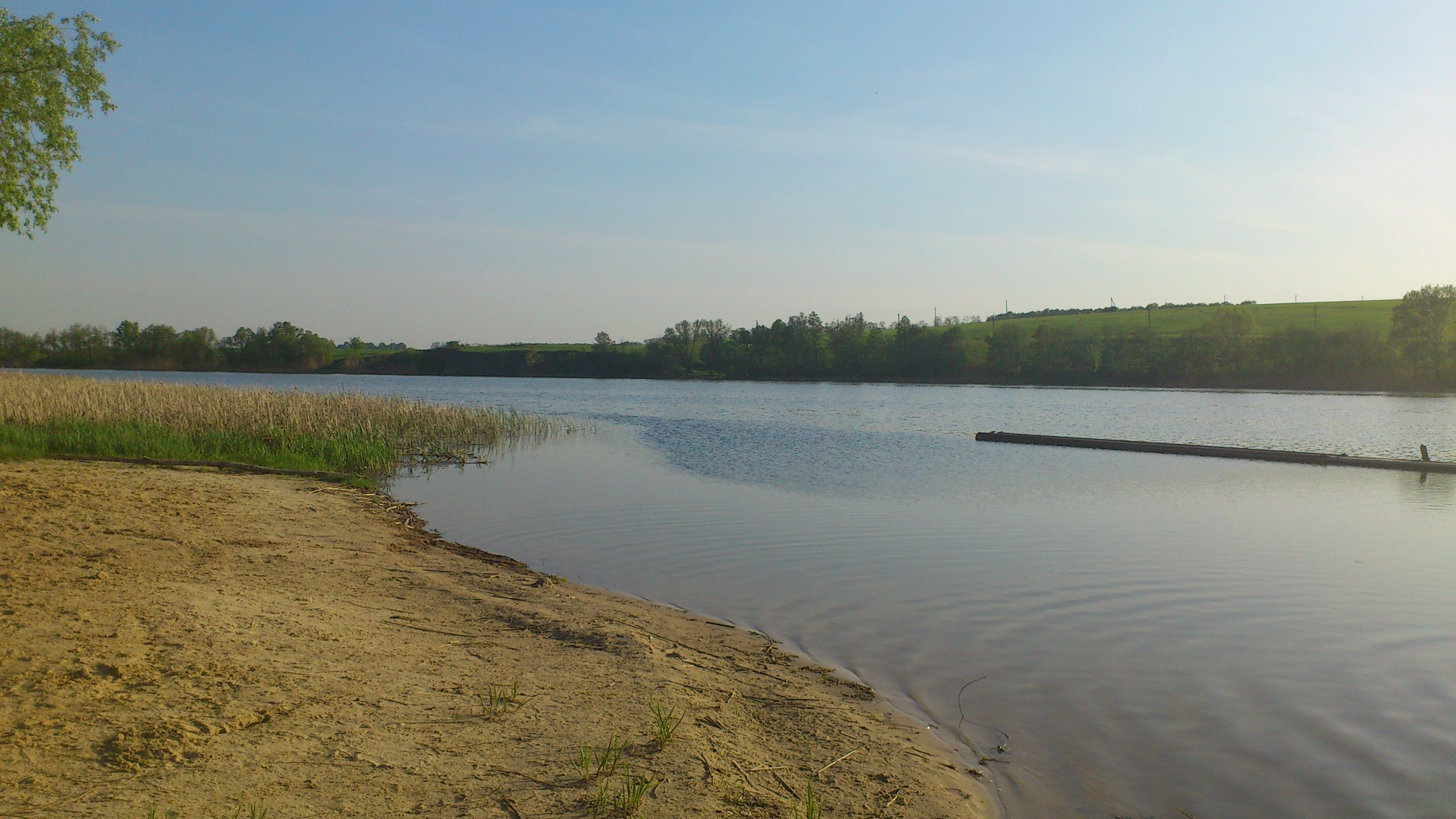

Location
- Country: Ukraine

Physical characteristics
- Source: Confluence of Tikych and Velyka Vys
  - location: Kirovohrad Oblast
  - coordinates: 48°44′45″N 30°53′30″E
- Mouth
  - location: Southern Bug
  - coordinates: 48.0423°N 30.8491°E
- Length: 111 km (69 mi)
- Basin size: 16,725 km^{2} (6,458 sq mi)

Basin features
- Progression: Southern Bug→ Dnieper–Bug estuary→ Black Sea

The Syniukha (Ukrainian: Синюха, lit. 'Blue Waters') is a river in Ukraine, a left tributary of the Southern Bug, the basin of Black Sea. Its name means blue or of blue shade. It is 111 kilometres (69 mi) long with a 16,700 square kilometres (6,448 sq mi) basin area. It is formed at the confluence of its source rivers the Tikych (itself formed at the confluence of the Hnyly Tikych and the Hirskyi Tikych) and the Velyka Vys. It flows into the Southern Bug at Pervomaisk.

It is believed that in the mid-14th century one of the major battles between the Grand Duchy of Lithuania and the Ulus Jochi, the Battle of Blue Waters, took place here.

The Kohutivka Reserve of national importance is by the Yatran village, at the confluence of Yatran River and Syniukha.

== Bibliography ==
- Географічна енциклопедія України: в 3-х томах / Редколегія: О. М. Маринич (відпов. ред.) та ін. — К.: «Українська радянська енциклопедія» імені М. П. Бажана, 1989.
