= Yatran (village) =

Village in Holovanivsk Raion, Kirovohrad Oblast, Ukraine

Coordinates: 48°28′21″N 30°44′09″E

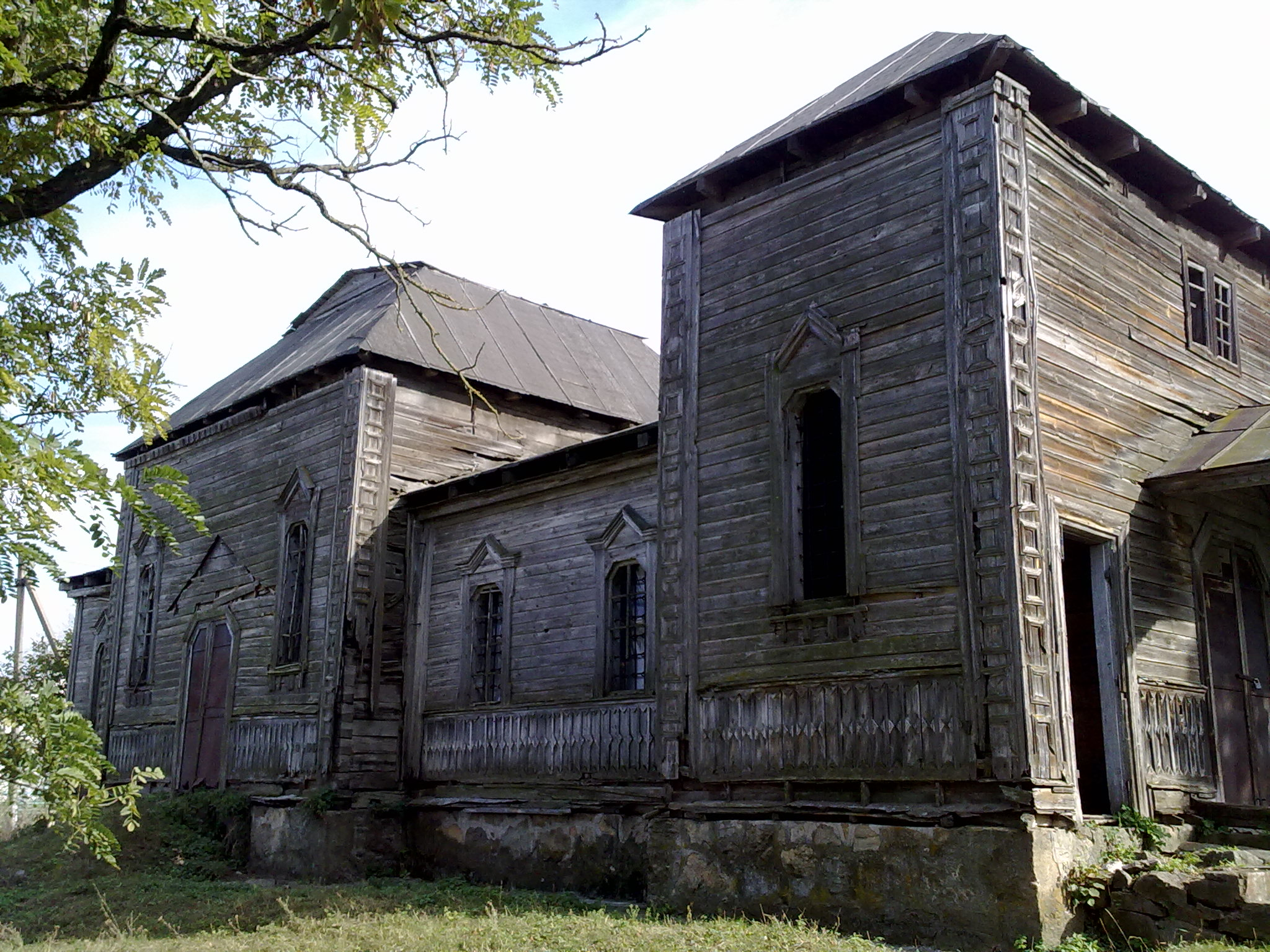
Church of the Most Pure Mother of God

Yatran (Ukrainian: Ятрань), former name: Kohutvika (Когутівка) is a village in Holovanivsk Raion, Kirovohrad Oblast, Ukraine.

The Kohutivka Reserve of national importance is by the village, at the confluence of Yatran River and Syniukha.
