= Battle of Korsun–Cherkassy =

Battle of World War II

Battle of the Korsun–Cherkassy pocket
- Part of the Dnieper–Carpathian offensive on the Eastern Front of World War II
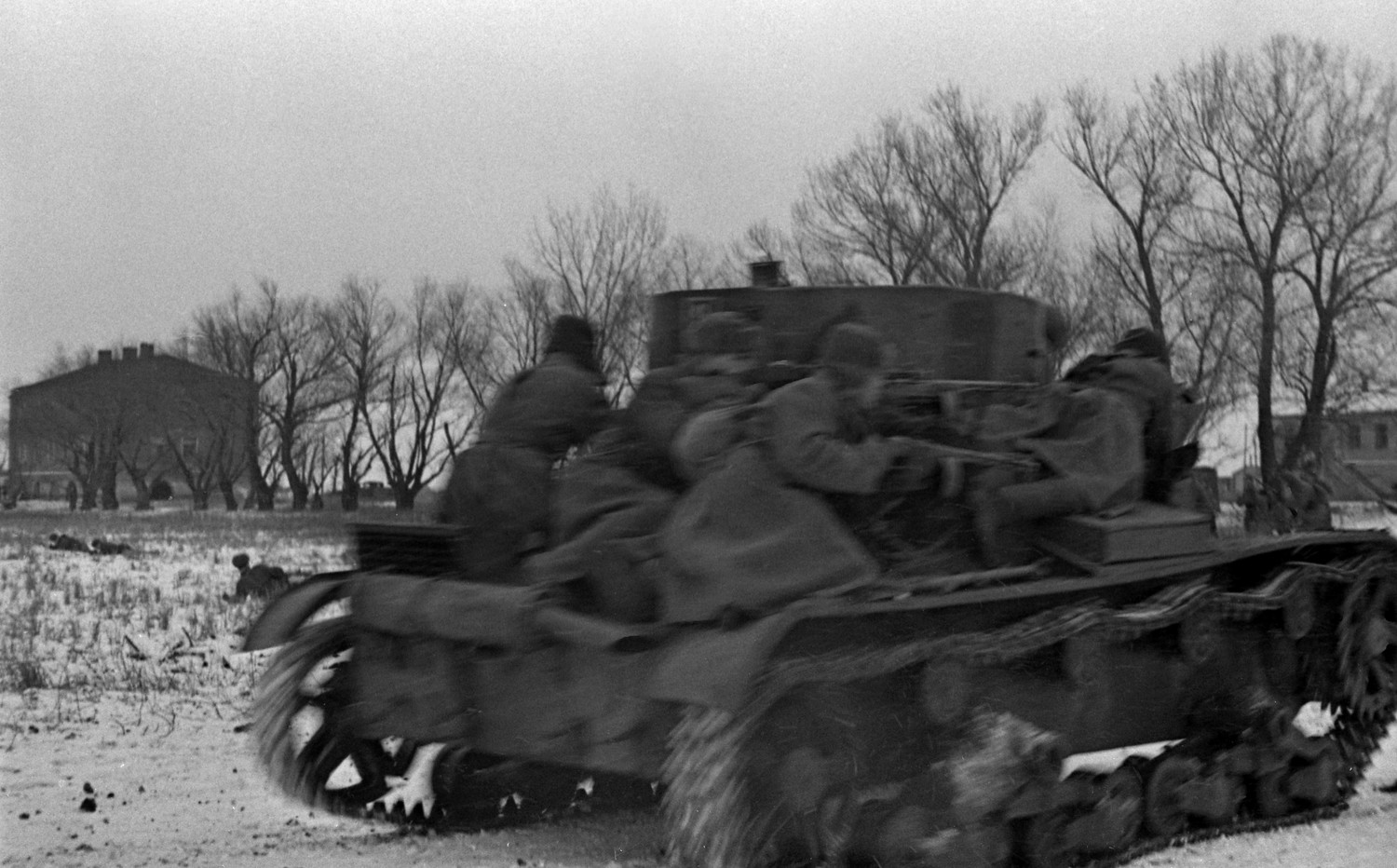
- Red Army assault force on T-26 light tank in Korsun-Shevchenkovski region
Date	24 January – 16 February 1944
Location	Cherkassy / Korsun, Ukrainian SSR, Soviet Union
Result	Soviet victory

Belligerents
Germany	Soviet Union

Commanders and leaders
Erich von Manstein; Otto Wöhler; Hermann Breith; Wilhelm Stemmermann †	Georgy Zhukov; Nikolai Vatutin; Ivan Konev

Strength
60,000–100,000+ men in pocket 59 tanks in pocket 242 artillery pieces in pocket 80,000 men (reinforcement); III Panzer Corps (201 tanks) (reinforcement); XLVII Panzer Corps (58 tanks) (reinforcement)	336,700 men 524 tanks (initially); 400 tanks (reinforcement); 1,054 aircraft 5,300 artillery pieces and mortars

Casualties and losses
Total: ~40,000–110,000+ In the pocket: 30,000–100,000+ casualties; Outside the pocket: 1st Panzer Army: 4,181 men; VII Army Corps: 1,000 men; 8th Army: 4,500 men; 300 tanks and assault guns 50 aircraft	Total: ~80,188 24,286 killed or missing 55,902 wounded and sick 728 tanks

The Battle of Korsun–Cherkassy (Russian: Корсунь-Шевченковская операция; Ukrainian: Корсунь-Шевченківська операція), also known as the Battle of the Korsun–Cherkassy Pocket, was a World War II battle fought from 24 January to 16 February 1944 in the course of the Soviet Dnieper–Carpathian offensive in Ukraine, following the Korsun–Shevchenkovsky offensive.

In the battle, the 1st and 2nd Ukrainian Fronts, commanded, respectively, by Nikolai Vatutin and Ivan Konev, encircled German forces of Army Group South in a pocket near the Dnieper River. During weeks of fighting, the two Red Army Fronts tried to eradicate the pocket. The encircled German units attempted a breakout in coordination with a relief attempt by other German forces, resulting in heavy casualties, estimates of which vary.

The Soviet victory in the Korsun–Cherkassy offensive marked the successful implementation of Soviet deep operations. Soviet deep battle doctrine envisaged the breaking of the enemy's forward defences to allow fresh operational reserves to exploit the breakthrough by driving into the strategic depth of the enemy front. The arrival of large numbers of American- and British-built trucks and halftracks gave the Soviet forces much greater mobility than they had had before. This, coupled with the Soviet capacity to hold large formations in reserve, gave the Red Army the ability to drive deep behind German defenses again and again.

Though the Soviet operation at Korsun did not result in the collapse of the German front that the Soviet command had hoped for, it marked a significant deterioration in the strength available to the German Army on that front, especially in heavy weaponry, nearly all of which was lost during the breakout. Through the rest of the war the Red Army would place large German forces in jeopardy, while the Germans were stretched thin and constantly attempting to extract themselves from one crisis to the next. Mobile Soviet offensives were the hallmark of the Eastern Front for the remainder of the war.

== January 1944 ==
In the autumn of 1943, the German forces of Field Marshal Erich von Manstein's Army Group South including General Otto Wöhler's 8th Army had fallen back to the Panther–Wotan line, a defensive position that in Ukraine followed the Dnieper River. However, when the German forces arrived, construction had only just been started, so the defensive positions essentially did not exist.

By 1 December 1943, the line had been broken and the Soviet Army had crossed the Dnieper in force. Only two corps, the XI under General Wilhelm Stemmermann, the XLII Army Corps under Lieutenant General Theobald Lieb and the attached Corps Detachment B from the 8th Army were holding a salient in the new Soviet line. The salient to the west of Cherkassy extended some 100 kilometers to the Dnieper River settlement of Kanev, with the town of Korsun roughly in the center of the salient, with the 1st Ukrainian Front to its left and the 2nd Ukrainian Front to its right.

Marshal of the Soviet Union Georgy Zhukov realized the potential for destroying Wöhler's 8th Army, using tactics similar to those used to encircle and destroy Paulus's 6th Army in the Battle of Stalingrad. Zhukov recommended to the Soviet Supreme Command (Stavka) deploying the 1st and 2nd Ukrainian Fronts to form two armored rings of encirclement: an inner ring around the pocket, followed by the destruction of the forces it contained, and an external ring to prevent relief formations from reaching the surrounded units. Despite repeated warnings from Manstein and others, Hitler refused to allow the exposed units to be pulled back.

General Konev held a conference at his headquarters at Boltushki on 15 January, with his commanders and their political commissars to pass on the orders received from Stavka. The initial attack was to be conducted by Konev's own 2nd Ukrainian Front from the southeast by the 53rd Army and 4th Guards Army, with the 5th Guards Tank Army to exploit penetrations, supported by the 5th Air Army, to be joined in progress by the 52nd Army, 5th Guards Cavalry Corps and the 2nd Tank Army. Additionally, from Vatutin's 1st Ukrainian Front, the 27th and 40th Armies were to be deployed from the northwest, with the 6th Tank Army to exploit penetrations, supported by the 2nd Air Army. Many of these formations had received an inflow of new personnel. Red Army planning further included extensive deception operations that the Soviets claimed were successful; however, the German 8th Army war diary shows clearly that the German staff was concerned about the threat at hand.

== Encirclement ==
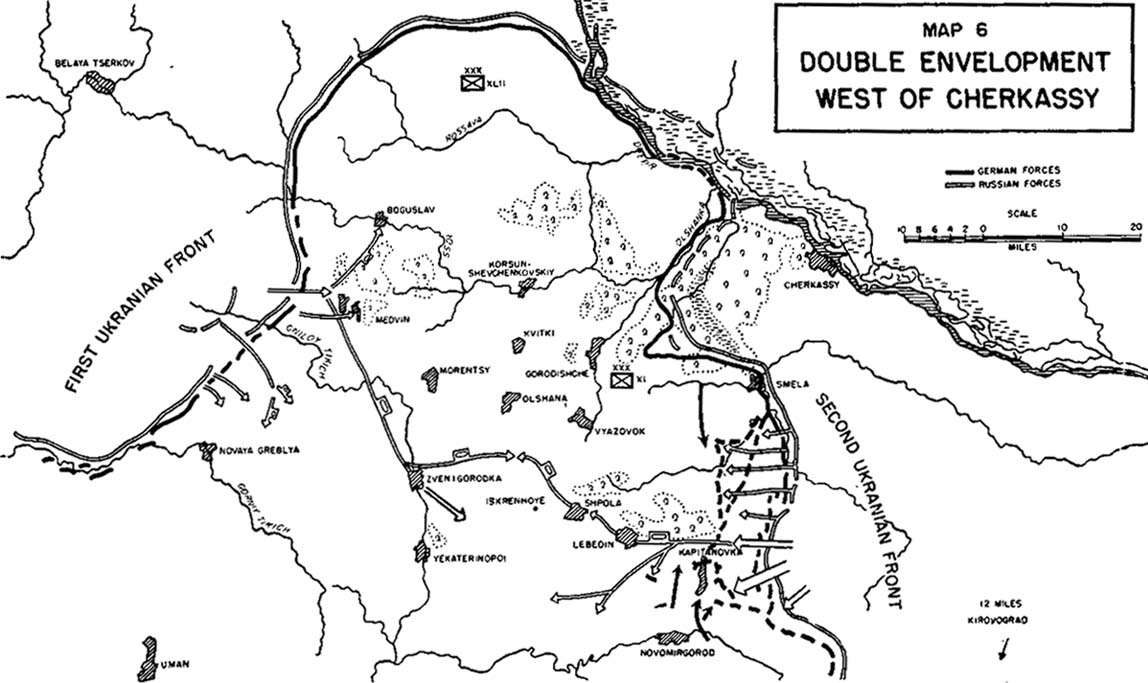
Sweeping Soviet advances that created the pocket.

The Soviet attack started on 24 January when Konev's 2nd Ukrainian Front attacked the salient from the southeast. A breakthrough was quickly achieved, and the penetration was exploited by the 5th Guards Tank Army and the 5th Guards Cavalry Corps, the following day. Despite the awareness of the German 8th Army's staff that an attack was imminent, they were surprised by the appearance of the 1st Ukrainian Front's newly formed 6th Tank Army. The 6th Tank Army, with 160 tanks and 50 self-propelled guns, was inexperienced and took longer than expected to penetrate the western flank of the salient. A "mobile group" from the 5th Mechanized Corps' 233rd Tank Brigade, under the command of General Savelev, with 50 tanks and 200 sub-machine gun armed infantrymen, occupied Lysyanka and moved into the outskirts of Zvenyhorodka by 28 January. Here, these troops of the 6th Tank Army met the 2nd Ukrainian Front's 20th Tank Corps. Over the next three days, the two tank armies formed a thinly manned outer ring around what was now the Korsun Pocket while another, inner, ring was formed by the Soviet 27th, 52nd, and 4th Guard Armies.

The Soviet commanders were optimistic about the progress of the operation. Stalin was promised a second Stalingrad, and he expected it. Konev wired: "There is no need to worry, Comrade Stalin. The encircled enemy will not escape." Inside the pocket were nearly 60,000 men from six German divisions, at about 55% of their authorized strength, along with a number of smaller combat units. Among the trapped German forces were the 5th SS Panzer Division Wiking, with the attached 5th SS Infantry Brigade Wallonien, the Estonian SS infantry battalion Narwa, and "several thousand" Russian auxiliaries. General Wilhelm Stemmermann, the commander of the XI Corps, was placed in command of the forces in the pocket. These forces were designated Gruppe Stemmermann. The 5th SS Panzer Division, with some 11,400 personnel, had 30 operational Panzer III/IV tanks and assault guns left, and six more under repair. The division further had 47 artillery pieces, of which 12 were self-propelled guns.

== German relief attacks ==
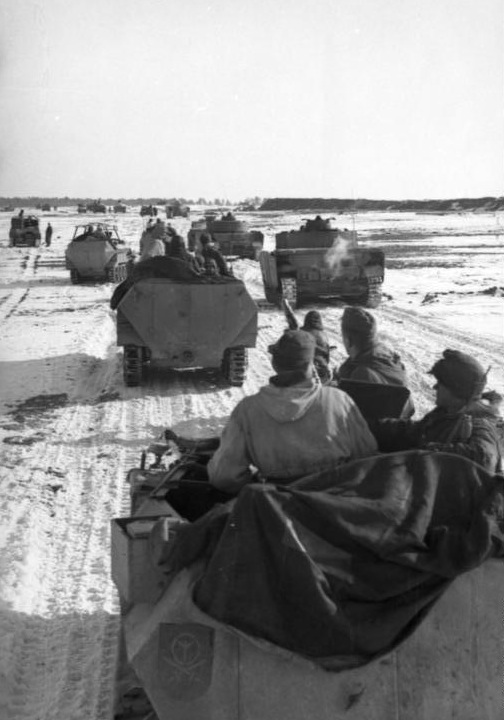
The relief attempt begins. Tanks and halftracks of 1st Panzer Division begin movements towards the pocket, early February 1944

Manstein moved quickly, and by early February the III and XLVII Panzer Corps were assembled for a relief effort. Hitler intervened, however, and ordered the attack be transformed into an effort to counter-encircle the two Soviet army groups.

General Hermann Breith, commander of the III Panzer Corps, requested the relief formations be united to attempt to force a corridor to the encircled Gruppe Stemmermann. This request was refused, and the counter-encirclement of the Soviet forces was attempted. The attack by the XLVII Panzer Corps' 11th Panzer Division on the southeastern flank of the pocket quickly stalled, as it had only 27 tanks and 34 assault guns operational. The III Panzer Corps' attempt continued until 8 February, when it became undeniable that the effort had failed. Manstein ordered the corps to instead drive directly to the relief of Gruppe Stemmermann. Pulling the III Panzer Corps back and reorganizing for the new attack 15 kilometers south of Boyarka, took three days.

On 11 February, Breith began a push with the 16th and 17th Panzer Divisions driving toward the Gniloy Tikich River. They initially made good progress. The 1st Panzer Division and 1st SS Panzer Division LSSAH covered the northern flank of the drive. As they drove deeper into the Soviet positions, Zhukov ordered Vatutin to assemble four tank corps with the goal of cutting off the attacking German spearhead. The weather warmed, turning the roads to a soft mud and bogging down German progress. Here the liabilities of Germany's wheeled vehicles became evident. The Soviet forces had been provided lend-lease U.S. built four-wheel and six-wheel drive trucks. These were largely able to get through, whereas German two-wheel-drive vehicles were not.

Konev issued orders for the 4th Guards Army and 5th Guards Cavalry Corps to attempt to split the pocket on the night of 5–6 February. The strike was to fall on the boundary between the two German corps. As fighting progressed, the Soviet goal became clear to Stemmermann and Lieb. Stemmermann ordered the 5th SS Division's armor to the scene. Together with the 72nd Infantry Division, it brought the Soviet attack to a halt, buying the Germans time. Red Army efforts were renewed between 7–10 February. This effort was hobbled by supply shortages. The III Panzer Corps' penetrations toward the Gniloy Tikich River made the supply lines for Soviet formations such as Vatutin's 6th Tank Army much longer. The Red Air Force attempted to resupply some units using Polikarpov Po-2 aircraft. Despite logistical difficulties, units from the 2nd Ukrainian Front were able to close in on Korsun by 10 February, collapsing the pocket to an area of six by seven miles.

== German maneuver within the pocket ==
On 11 February, the III Panzer Corps continued its drive east. The force reached the Gniloy Tikich River and established a small bridgehead on the eastern bank. It was unable to advance further, meaning that Group Stemmermann had to fight its way out.

Both sides realized that the Wehrmacht relief efforts had reached a critical stage. Despite heavy Soviet propaganda inducements, very few German soldiers and no Waffen-SS men in the cauldron had surrendered. Zhukov thus decided to send parlementaires under a white flag with surrender demands. Red Army emissaries presented letters for both Stemmermann and Lieb signed by Marshal Zhukov and Generals Konev and Vatutin. After cordial talks, refreshments and a handshake, the Soviet delegation departed without a positive answer.

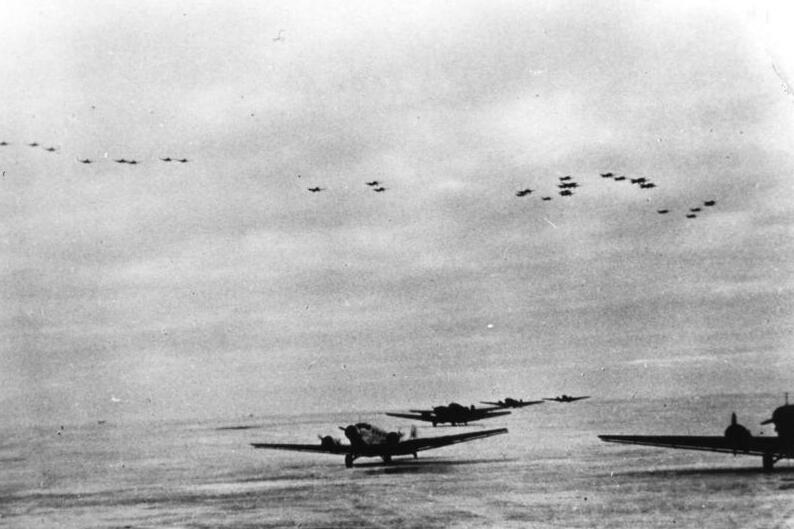
Ju 52s at Korsun airfield, Ju 87s in formation above (January 1944).

The German air force mounted an aerial resupply operation to both the encircled forces and the German relief columns. On 28 January, the VIII Aviation Corps deployed 832 transport aircraft, 478 bombers (from which supplies were dropped at low altitude), 58 fighter bombers, and 168 fighters. Over the course of the operation, 32 transport aircraft, 13 bombers, and five fighters were lost. After the Korsun airfield was abandoned on 12 February, deliveries were dropped in by parachute.

The Luftwaffe delivered 82,948 gallons of fuel, 868 tons of ammunition and four tons of medical supplies to the encircled forces and 325 tons of ammunition, 74,289 gallons of fuel and 24 tons of food to spearheads of the relief formations, as well as evacuating 4,161 wounded while the Korsun airfield remained operational. The operation had only met about half (78 tons) of the daily requirements (150 tons) of the encircled troops as estimated by the German 8th Army headquarters.

Stemmermann began withdrawing troops from the north side of the pocket, reorienting the thrust of the escape direction, and attacking south to move toward the relief forces on the north bank of the Gniloy Tikich. The encircled forces aimed to capture the villages of Novo-Buda, Komarovka, Khilki, and Shanderovka at the southwestern perimeter of the pocket to reach a favorable jump-off line for the breakout. On 11 and 12 February, elements of the 72nd Infantry Division captured Novo-Buda and Komarovka, respectively. On the evening of 15 February, Khilki was secured, against a Soviet counterattack. However, of all the German divisions in the pocket, the 5th SS Panzer Division contributed the most to continued operations. Since the SS Division Wiking was the only truly mobile force inside the pocket, the division's tracked units were repeatedly shifted from one end of the pocket to the other to shore up crumbling lines.

The pocket had "wandered" south and halfway toward the relief force and rested on the village of Shanderovka. The settlement was heavily defended by the Soviets; it was captured by 72nd Infantry troops, retaken by units of the Soviet 27th Army and recaptured by the Germania regiment of 5th SS Panzer Division. By nightfall on 16 February, the III Panzer Corps fought its way closer to the encircled formations, with spearheads now seven kilometers from Group Stemmermann.

== Appeal from the NKFD ==
The pocket led to an attempt by the Soviet Union to enlist the National Committee for a Free Germany (NKFD) and the League of German Officers (BDO) in order to convince the German troops to surrender. The prisoners of war and BDO members Generals Walther von Seydlitz-Kurzbach, Alexander Edler von Daniels and Otto Korfes visited the front on 10 February and made a personal appeal to the German commanders. Appeals were also made on the radio. More to it, the members of the NKFD were sent to the battlefield where they spread NKFD leaflets which served as safe conduct passes into captivity showing that the surrender is voluntary and that the soldiers with such leaflets should be handed over to the NKFD. The operation was relatively successful, and out of the 18,200 captured Germans each third produced an NKFD leaflet. Despite the failure to alter the fighting resolution of the German Commander at Cherkassy, this operation raised the profile of the NKFD and BDO among both the Allies and Axis. Von Seydlitz was dismissed from the army and sentenced to death in absentia and Hitler personally authorized Sippenhaft against his family.

== Breakout attempt ==
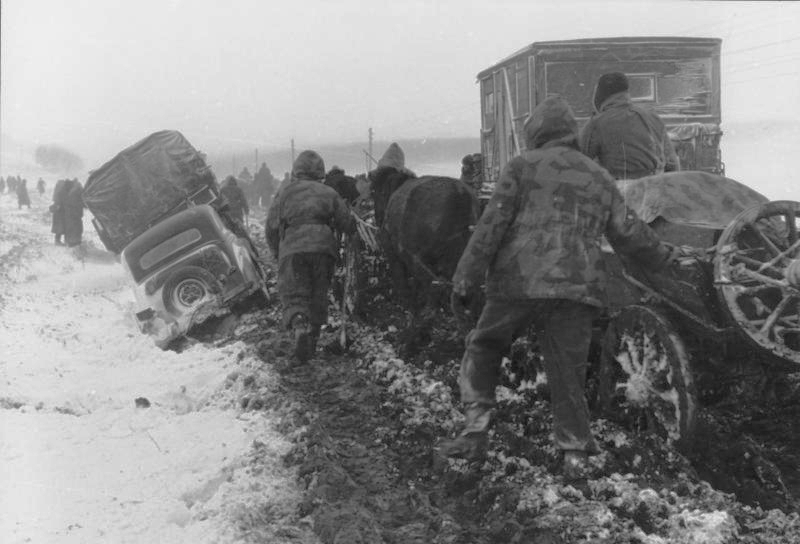
Congestion on the road

The northward thrust toward the pocket by the III Panzer Corps had been halted by Red Army determination, terrain, and fuel shortages. After several failed attempts by German armored formations to seize and hold Hill 239 (49°15.42′N 30°49.38′E Lysyanka, Cherkasy Oblast, Ukraine) and advance on Shanderovka, Soviet counterattacks by the 5th Guards Tank Army forced the III Panzer Corps into costly defensive fighting. The 8th Army radioed Stemmermann: "Capacity for action by III Panzer Corps limited by weather and supply situation. Gruppe Stemmermann must perform breakthrough as far as the line Zhurzintsy–Hill 239 by its own effort. There link up with III Panzer Corps."

The message did not specify that Zhurzintsy and the hill were still firmly in Soviet hands—a failure that caused Group Stemmermann severe casualties during the German breakout of the pocket. General Lieutenant Lieb was appointed by the 8th Army to lead the breakout. In the seven kilometers that separated Group Stemmermann and the III Panzer Corps, Konev was positioning his forces for an attack slated for 17 February. His three armies – the 4th Guards, 27th, 52nd and 5th Guards Cavalry Corps – surrounded the encircled German forces. The Red Army force also included elements of the 5th Guards Tank Army, with its armor placed in the area that separated Group Stemmermann and the III Panzer Corps.

Stemmermann elected to stay behind with a rearguard of 6,500 men, the remaining combined strength of the 57th and 88th Infantry Divisions. The pocket was at this point just five kilometers in diameter, with no room to maneuver. Shanderovka, once seen as a viable escape route, became known as "Hell's Gate". The Red Army subjected the area to intense artillery and rocket fire, while the Red Air Force ground attack aircraft bombed and strafed the encircled troops, only infrequently challenged by the Luftwaffe. Various unit diaries described a scene of gloom, with fires caused by Soviet night bombing with incendiaries, destroyed or abandoned vehicles everywhere and wounded men and disorganized units on muddy roads. Konev ordered Cossack cavalry units to perform sabre attacks on the disorganised German units. Ukrainian civilians were caught between the combatants. On 16 February 1944, Manstein, without waiting for a decision by Hitler, sent a radio message to Stemmermann to authorize the breakout: "Password Freedom, objective Lysyanka, 2300 hours."

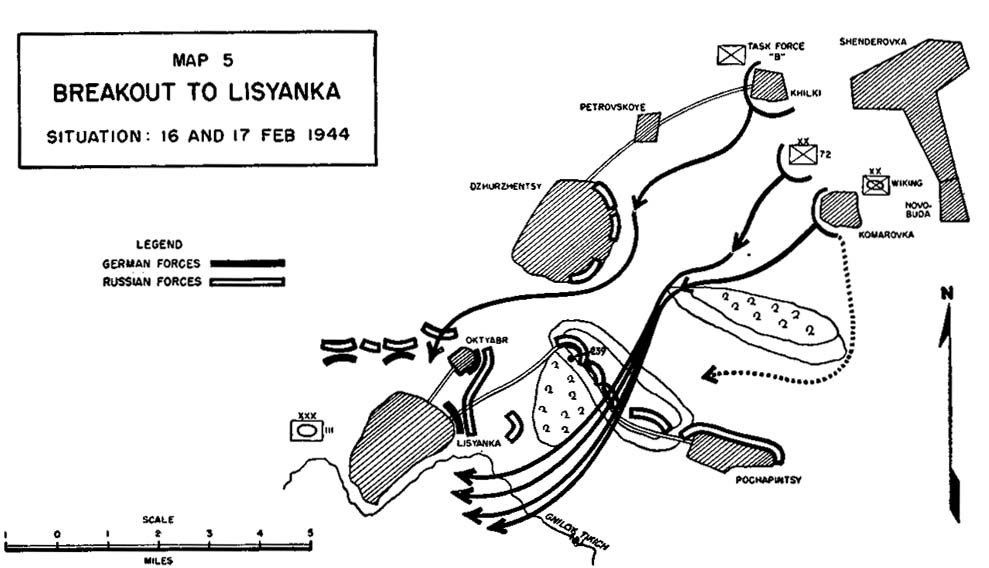
The German breakout

With extreme reluctance, Stemmermann and Lieb decided to leave 1,450 non-ambulatory wounded at Shanderovka, attended by doctors and orderlies. The troops then began to assemble at dusk into three assault columns, with Division Group 112 to the north, the 5th SS Panzer Division to the south and the 72nd Division in the center, with the reinforced 105th Regiment in the first echelon to provide assault power. Several battalions and regiments reached the German lines at Oktyabr by 0410. The 105th entered Lysyanka at 0630.

At the left flank column, a reconnaissance patrol returned with the news that Hill 239 was occupied by Soviet T-34 tanks of the 5th Guards Tank Army. The high ground had to be bypassed. The direction of the German retreat had to veer off to the south toward the Gniloy Tikich River. When daylight arrived, the German breakout plan began to unravel. Very few armored vehicles and other heavy equipment could climb the slippery, thawing hillsides and the weapons had to be destroyed and abandoned.

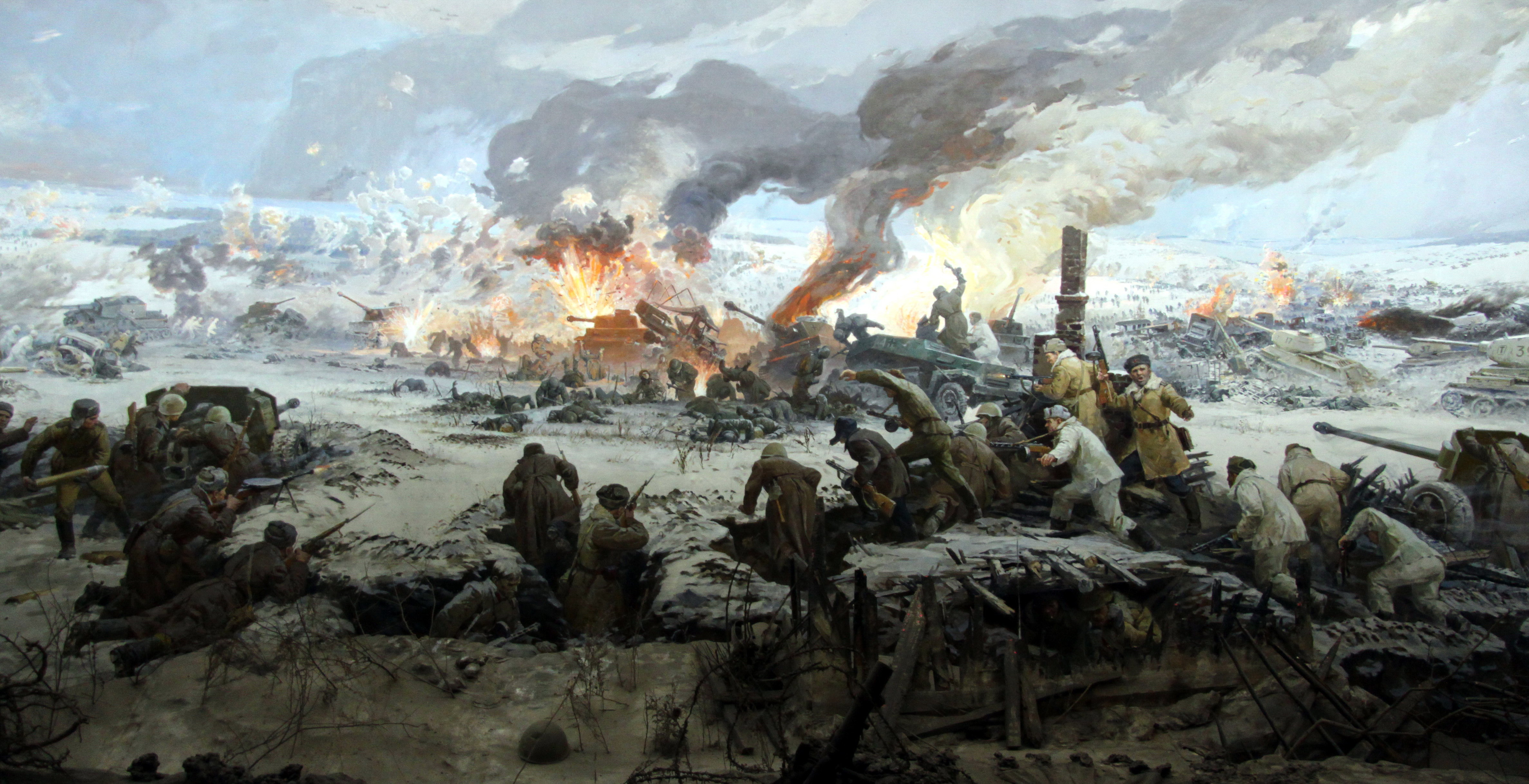
Diorama in Battle of the Korsun–Shevchenkovsky Pocket Museum, Korsun–Shevchenkovsky

General Konev, now aware of the German breakout, resolved to keep his promise to Stalin not to let the German forces escape. Soviet intelligence, however, at this stage vastly overestimated the armored strength of the III Panzer Corps, and Konev therefore proceeded in force. At this time, the 20th Tank Corps brought its brigade of the new Joseph Stalin-2s to the Korsun battlefield. Konev ordered all available armor and artillery to attack the escaping units, cut them into isolated groups and then destroy them piecemeal. The two blocking Soviet rifle divisions, the 206th Rifle and 5th Guards Airborne, had been smashed by the German assault forces; without infantry support Soviet tanks then fired into the German formations from a distance. With no anti-tank weapons in the field, T-34s commenced to wade into support troops, headquarters units, stragglers and Red-Cross identified medical columns.

Under the yellow sky of early morning and over ground covered with wet snow Soviet tanks made straight for the thick of the column, ploughing up and down, killing and crushing with their tracks. Almost simultaneously massed Cossack cavalry wheeled away from the tanks to hunt down and massacre men fleeing for the refuge of the hills: hands held high in surrender, the Cossacks sliced off with their sabres. The killing in this human hunt went on for several hours and a new round opened on the banks of the river Gniloy Tikich, where the survivors of the first collision of the German column with Soviet troops dragged and fought their way.

— John Erickson, in The Road to Berlin, p. 178.

By mid-day, the majority of the now intermingled divisions had reached the Gniloy Tikich stream, 15 meter wide and two meters deep due to melting snow. Despite the fact that the 1st Panzer Division had captured a bridge and engineers had erected another, the panicking men saw the river as their only escape. Since the main body was away and south of the bridgeheads, the last tanks, trucks and wagons were driven into the water, trees were felled to form makeshift bridges and the troops floundered across, with hundreds of men drowning, being swept downstream with horses and military debris. Many others succumbed to shock or hypothermia. Toward the end phase of the breakout, engineers had built several more bridges and rearguard units of the 57th and 88th Infantry Divisions crossed the river "dry", including 20 horse-drawn wagons with about 600 wounded.

That many escaped back to the German lines at Lysyanka was due in great measure to the exertions of the III Panzer Corps as it drove in relief of Group Stemmermann. The unit was equipped with Tigers and Panthers and an engineer battalion with specialist bridging skills.

== Outcome ==
The Red Army encirclement of Cherkassy–Korsun inflicted serious damage on six German divisions, including the 5th SS Panzer Division. Though most of the trapped men escaped, they had to leave nearly all of their heavy equipment behind. These units had to be withdrawn for rest and near complete re-equipping. The escaped wounded were transported from collection points near Uman to rehabilitation areas and hospitals in Poland, and were then sent on leave to their home towns.

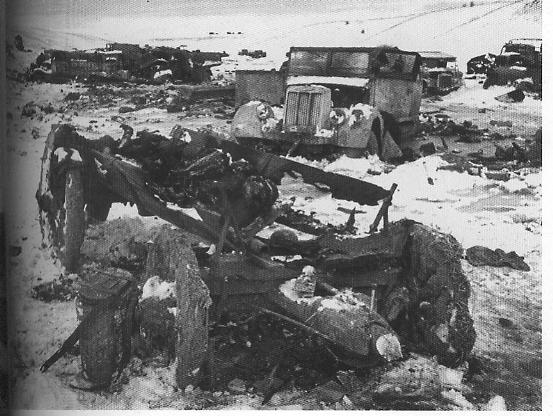
Some of the destroyed German equipment following the attempt to break out from Korsun.

In a U.S. Army brief written following the war, Lieb commented that when he assumed command of Force Stemmermann:

The 72nd and Wiking Divisions were completely intermingled. No longer did they have any tanks, artillery, vehicles or rations. Many soldiers were entirely without weapons, quite a few even without footgear. Neither division could be considered in any way able to fight. One regiment of Task Force B was intact and still had some artillery support. However, this regiment also had no vehicles and no rations left. All wounded, estimated at about 2,000, (...) were evacuated by air." He also stated: "For lack of vehicles and fuel, III Panzer Corps was unable to reinforce its units in the area of Lisyanka and Oktyabr. [It] had no extra supplies of any kind, and his forward elements were unable to provide rations for the troops emerging from the pocket.

With German armored reserves drawn to the Korsun Pocket, the Soviets struck Army Group South in two other sectors. The 13th and 60th Armies (General Vatutin's 1st Ukrainian Front) advanced south of the Pripiat' Marshes, capturing the remnants of the German XIII Corps at the Battle of Rovno and advancing to Lutsk. To the south, the 3rd and 4th Ukrainian Fronts (Generals Malinovsky and Tolbukhin) attacked along the bend of the Dnepr River, capturing Kryvyi Rih.

General Stemmermann was killed during the breakout when his command car was hit by a Soviet antitank gun. General Lieb survived the war. General Vatutin was shot by Ukrainian Nationalist UPA insurgents on 29 February 1944 and died on 15 April. The commander of 2nd Ukrainian Front, General Konev, was made a Marshal of the Soviet Union for his victory at Korsun. Konev also survived the war.

== Assessment ==
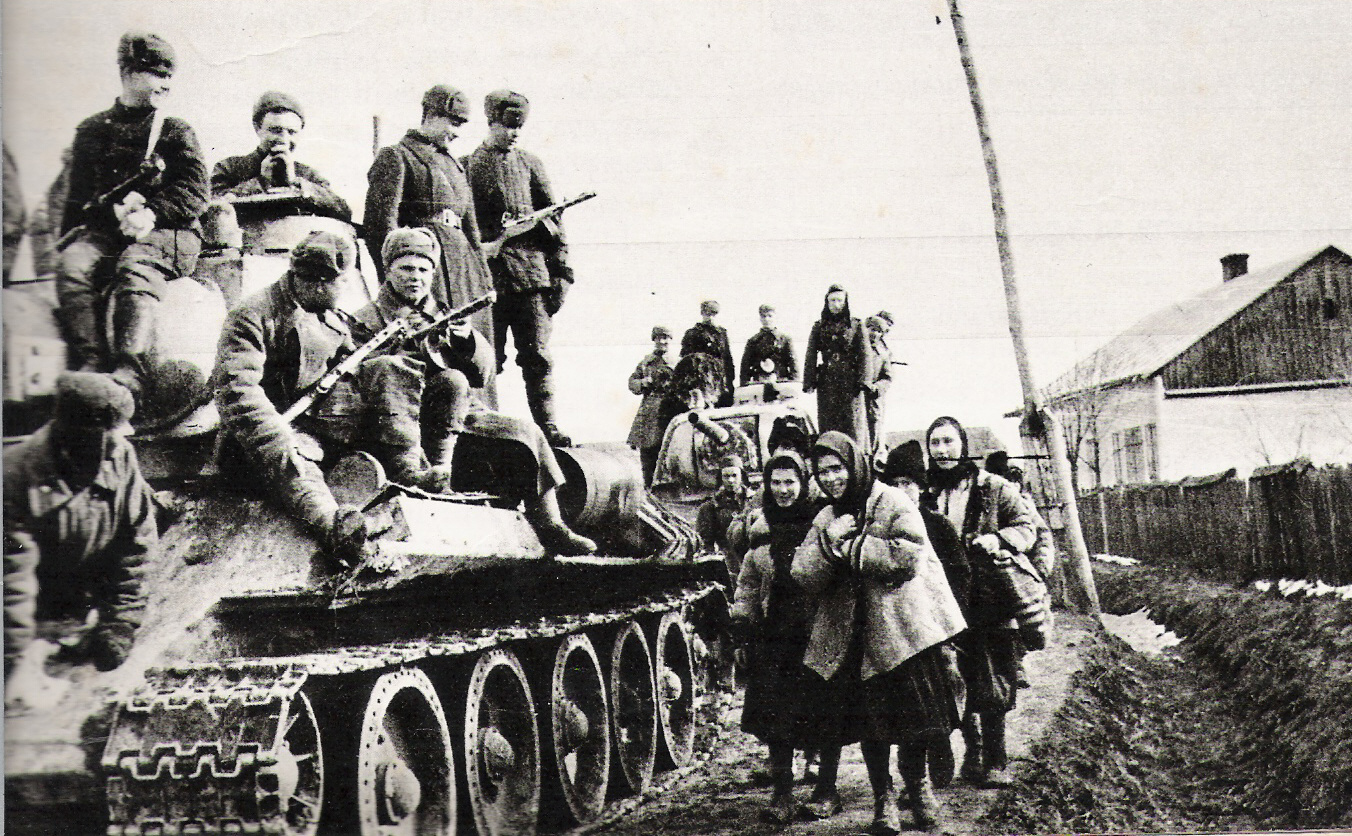
Soviet forces in Ukraine, 1944

The battle around Korsun was a major Soviet victory that enabled later advances in the next spring into Romania. An entire German army became trapped, and as the pocket collapsed the forces inside were forced to retreat through gaps in the Soviet forces surrounding them, resulting in significant losses in men and tremendous losses in equipment.

Hitler's insistence on holding the exposed salient strongly limited the options of German field commanders. Once the Soviets had encircled the German forces, relief efforts produced mixed results. The effectiveness of the German counterattack was limited by Hitler's plan for splitting his strength to attempt a counter envelopment. The XLVII Panzer Corps' attacks were ineffective due to the weakness of its divisions. Though the III Panzer Corps was far more effective, the corps wasted a week on a failed attempt to encircle the Soviet forces. When it was finally given the mission of relieving Gruppe Stemmermann, the Germans were unable to provide Bäke's heavy tank regiment with adequate fuel supplies, leading Bäke to stop his advance on Hill 239 because one group of his tanks had run out of fuel. This logistical failure was compounded by the vagueness of the radio message to General Stemmermann ordering the breakout attempt. Hill 239 remained under Soviet control, resulting in significant casualties among Stemmermann's retreating force.

The Soviet performance was also beset by errors. Soviet intelligence on German forces in the pocket was faulty in overestimating their strength. At the same time, the Soviets underestimated German capability to counterattack and hurriedly moved more forces forward to bolster the strength of their encircling rings. The Soviet air force was unable to significantly hinder the German aerial resupply effort. Ultimately, the encircling forces were unable to prevent a German breakout, allowing a significant portion of the trapped Germans to escape. Given the initial circumstances of the battle, the degree of Soviet losses makes it clear that while the Soviets won at Korsun, it was a victory that came at a high price.

Soviet sources and testimonials from the front line assert that the total loss in German men was catastrophic, with estimates collected from mass graves and the battlefield accounting for roughly 55,000 dead and 18,000 German prisoners from the encircled formations alone. German sources differ on total losses, holding that of the 60,000 men originally inside the pocket, the number had shrunk to less than 50,000 by 16 February. 45,000 of these took part in the breakout, resulting in 27,703 German soldiers and 1,063 Russian auxiliaries breaking out unscathed. Total casualties killed, wounded or missing, were claimed at 31,000, yet these numbers do not count losses from the rescuing forces. German official documents listed total escapees as 40,423, including the wounded flown out of the pocket and evacuated from Lysyanka. While there were claims that "roughly two out of three" encircled men succeeding in escaping the pocket, "almost one third of their men [were either] dead or wounded."

Soviet sources tally losses of 80,188 casualties for the 1st and 2nd Ukrainian Fronts, with 24,286 killed and missing, and 55,902 wounded. These losses were incurred over the period of 24 January – 17 February 1944 during both the encirclements and the breakout attempts.

== Use in propaganda ==
Both sides hailed the events at Korsun as a victory. Marshal Konev claimed to have inflicted 130,000 German casualties, an assertion that German official history dismissed. Soviet historian Sergey Smirnov described the victory at Korsun as a "Stalingrad on the Dnieper," and the victory was hailed as a culmination of Soviet armored strength against the ailing Wehrmacht. Marshal Zhukov disliked being overshadowed by his rival, noting that on 18 February 1944, official honors were given in Moscow to the 2nd Ukrainian Front—but not the 1st Ukrainian Front—"an unforgivable error of the part of the supreme commander [Stalin]".

On the part of the Germans, the counterattack was depicted as a glorious success in which one group of brave German soldiers freed their equally heroic comrades who had been trapped in the pocket. However, General von Vormann, who commanded the relief attempt of the XLVII Panzer Corps, bitterly noted that "the troops who took part were astonished and unbelieving when they were told they had won a great victory at Cherkassy in the Ukraine in 1944." The German high command was relieved that many troops were able to escape. Adolf Hitler supposedly only complained briefly about the amount of equipment that had to be left behind.

== Historiography ==
One of the initial historiographical works on the fighting at Korsun was a 1952 U.S. Army publication, DA Pamphlet 20–234, Operations of Encircled Forces: German Experiences in Russia. This work was written in the context of NATO's Cold War confrontation with the Soviet Union, and the authors highlighted the historical experience of the Wehrmacht which might prove useful to NATO forces had a war between the Soviet Union and the NATO countries broken out. Like most of the English-language works on the Eastern Front of this era, it was written from the German point of view and without the benefit of wartime records.

John Erickson's 1983 The Road to Berlin and David Glantz's 1995 (2015) When Titans Clashed covered events on the entire Eastern Front from a German and Soviet perspective, and devoted several pages to the fighting in the Korsun Pocket. Erickson did not question Soviet claims regarding German casualties, and Glantz questioned the veracity of German claims regarding the total of escapees from the pocket. Glantz has also translated the Soviet General Staff Study on the Korsun Operation into English as The Battle for the Ukraine: The Red Army's Korsun'-Shevchenkovkii Operation, 1944.

More recently, the 2002 work by U.S. Army historian Douglas Nash, Hell's Gate: The Battle of the Cherkassy Pocket, January–February 1944, took issue with Soviet claims that Korsun was another Stalingrad. Similarly, the Swedish historians Niklas Zetterling and Anders Frankson disputed the assertions of the Soviet General Staff Study of the Korsun Operation in their 2008 work, The Korsun Pocket. The Encirclement and Breakout of a German Army in the East, 1944, describing the staff study as "anything but accurate" and "completely unreliable." Both Nash and Zetterling/Frankson conclude that Korsun was a Soviet victory.

In 2007, Volume 8 of the German semi-official history of the war (Germany and the Second World War) was published, and part of the work authored by Karl-Heinz Frieser addressed the events at Korsun. This work also doubts Soviet claims regarding the German casualties, while discussing the situation of the German forces in detail, using available data from the German archives. However, while German casualties in this work are taken from German archives, it bases its assessment of Soviet AFV and gun losses (uncritically) on German wartime claims. In 2011 author and historian Jean Lopez published, on Economica Edition (ISBN 978-2717860290) a book named "Le chaudron de Tcherkassy-Korsun", covering the battle.

== Bibliography ==
- Armstrong, Richard N. Red Army Tank Commanders: The Armored Guards. Atglen, Pennsylvania: Schiffer Publishing Ltd., 1994. ISBN 0-88740-581-9.
- Department of the Army Pamphlet 20–234. Operations of Encircled Forces: German Experiences in Russia. Washington, DC: U.S. Government Printing Office, 1952.
- Dunn, Walter S. Hitler's Nemesis The Red Army 1930–1945. Mechanicsburg: Stackpole Books, 2009.
- Erickson, John. The Road to Berlin, New Haven: Yale University Press, 1999.
- Frieser, Karl-Heinz; Schmider, Klaus; Schönherr, Klaus; Schreiber, Gerhard; Ungváry, Kristián; Wegner, Bernd (2007). Die Ostfront 1943/44 – Der Krieg im Osten und an den Nebenfronten [The Eastern Front 1943–1944: The War in the East and on the Neighbouring Fronts] (in German). Vol. VIII. München: Deutsche Verlags-Anstalt. ISBN 978-3-421-06235-2.
- Glantz, David & House, Jonathan M. When Titans Clashed: How the Red Army Stopped Hitler. Lawrence: University Press of Kansas, 1995. ISBN 0-7006-0717-X
- Haupt, Werner (1998). Army Group South: The Wehrmacht in Russia 1941–1945. Atglen, PA: Schiffer Military History. ISBN 0-7643-0385-6.
- Krivosheev, G. F. Soviet Casualties and Combat Losses in the Twentieth Century. London: Greenhill Books, 1997. ISBN 1-85367-280-7.
- Liddell Hart, B. H. (1970). History of the Second World War. New York, NY: Putnam.
- Loeffel, Robert (2012). Family Punishment in Nazi Germany: Sippenhaft, Terror and Myth. Palgrave Macmillan. ISBN 978-0-230-34305-4.
- Nash, Douglas E. No Stalingrad on the Dnieper (Paper written for the Command and General Staff College of the U.S. Army), Fort Leavenworth: 1995
- Nash, Douglas E. Hell's Gate: The Battle of the Cherkassy Pocket, January–February 1944 . Southbury, Connecticut: RZM Publishing, 2002. ISBN 0-9657584-3-5
- Perrett, Bryan. Knights of the Black Cross, Hitler's Panzerwaffe and Its Leaders. New York: St. Martin's Press, 1986. ISBN 0-7090-2806-7
- Shukman, Harold, ed. Stalin's Generals. New York: Grove Press, 1993. ISBN 1-84212-513-3
- Tessin, Georg. Verbände und Truppen der deutschen Wehrmacht und Waffen-SS 1939 – 1945, Vol. 14, Osnabrück: Biblio Verlag, 1980. ISBN 3-7648-1111-0.
- Willmott, H. P. (1984). June, 1944. New York, NY: Blandford Press. ISBN 0-7137-1446-8.
- Zetterling, Niklas & Frankson, Anders. The Korsun Pocket: The Encirclement and Breakout of a German Army in the East, 1944. Drexel Hill (Philadelphia), Pennsylvania: Casemate Publishers. 2008. ISBN 978-1-932033-88-5.
