= Yatran (river) =

River in Ukraine

Coordinates: 48°29′12″N 30°44′43″E

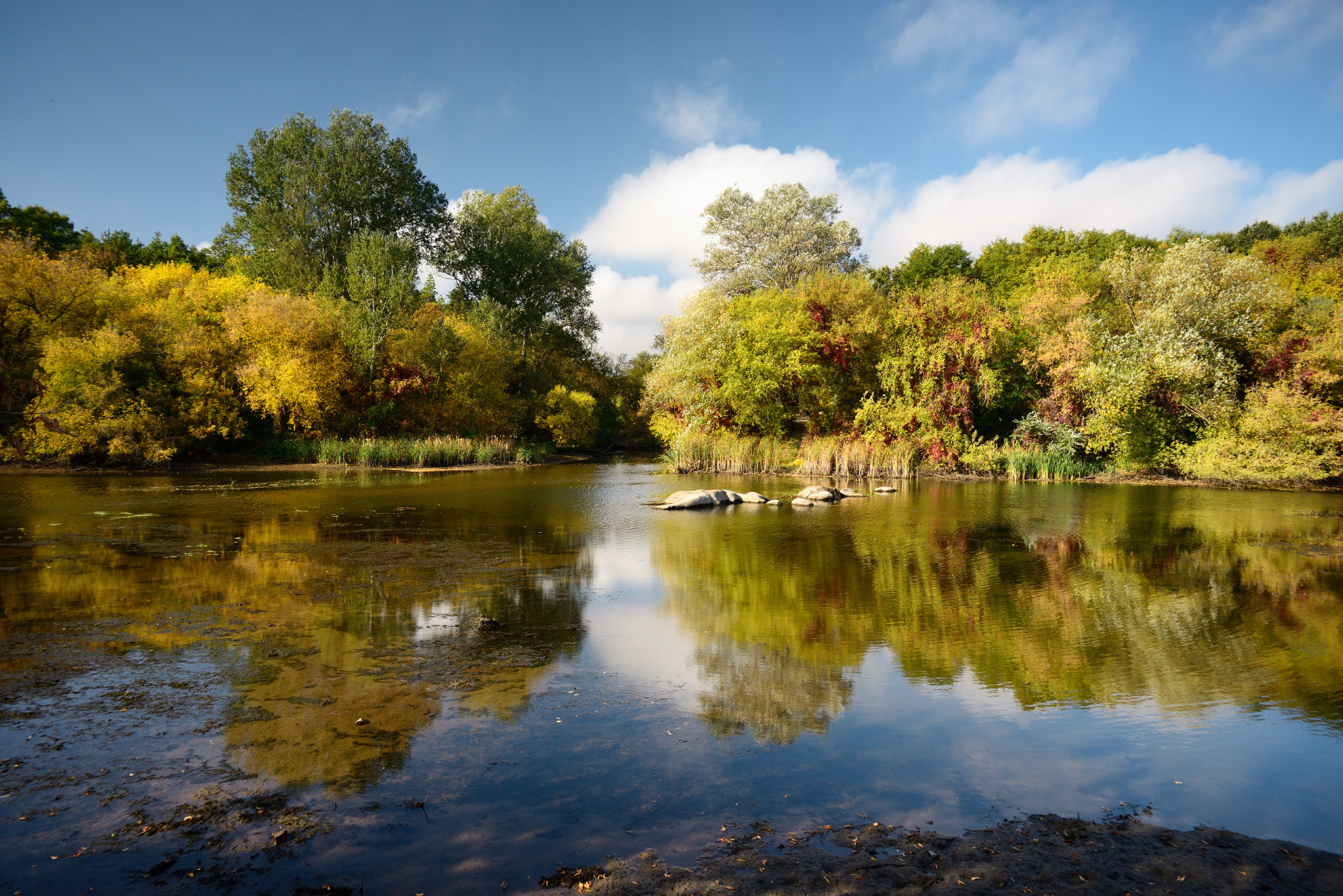
Yatran within Kohutivka Reserve

Yatran (Ukrainian: Ятрань) is a river in Ukraine, flowing in Cherkasy Oblast and Kirovohrad Oblast, a right tributary of Syniukha of the Southern Bug river basin.

The Kohutivka Reserve of national importance is by the Yatran village, at the confluence of Yatran River and Syniukha.
