= Velyka Vys =

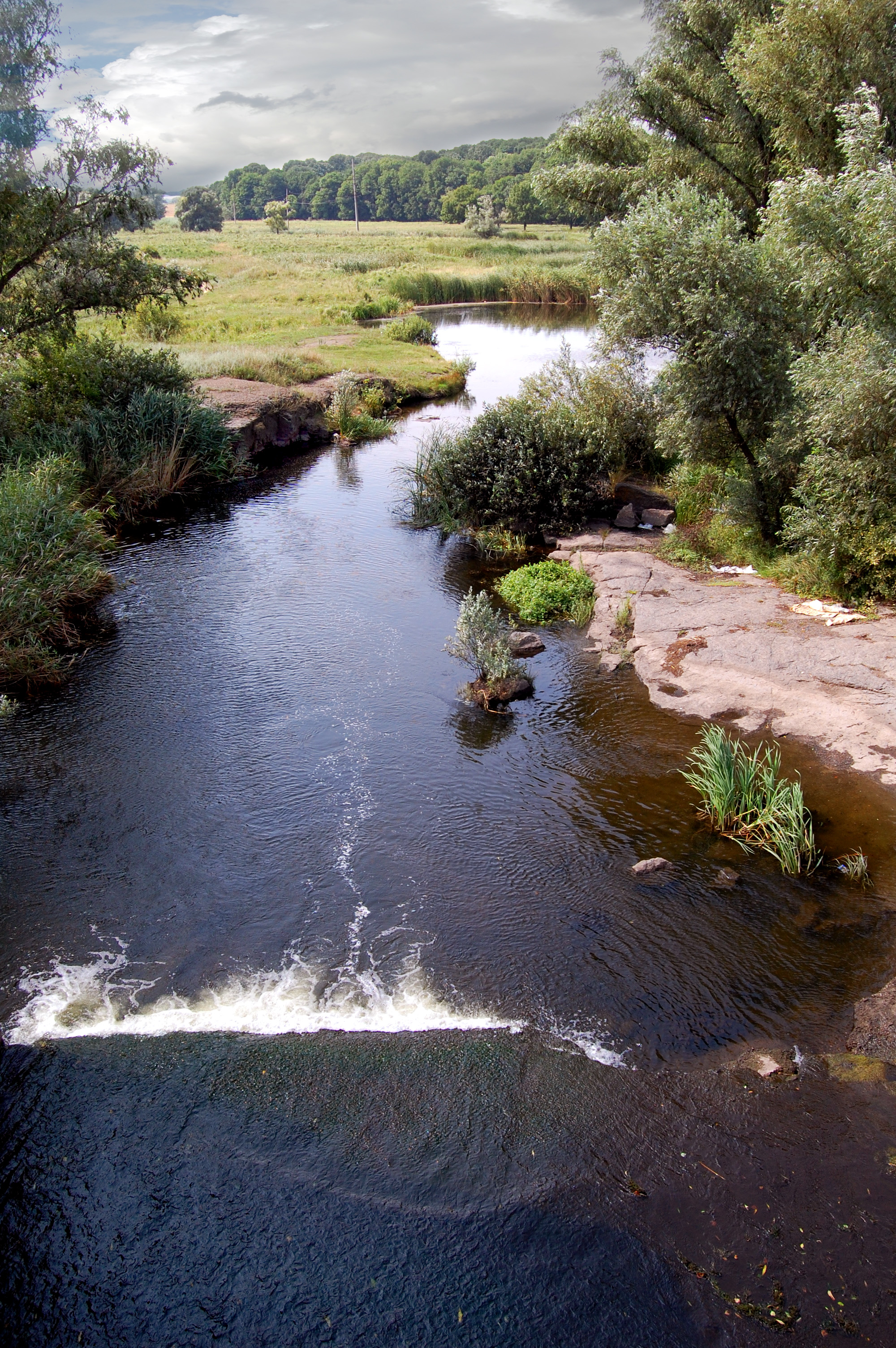
- Velyka Vys near Kamianka
- Native name: Велика Вись (Ukrainian)

Location
- Country: Ukraine

Physical characteristics
- Source
  - location: Kirovohrad Oblast, Ukraine
- Mouth
  - location: Syniukha
  - coordinates: 48.7464°N 30.8892°E
- Length: 166 km (103 mi)
- Basin size: 2,860 km^{2} (1,100 sq mi)

Basin features
- Progression: Syniukha→ Southern Bug→ Dnieper–Bug estuary→ Black Sea

The Velyka Vys (Ukrainian: Велика Вись) is a river in Ukraine, a left tributary of the Syniukha, in the basin of the Southern Bug. It is 166 kilometres (103 mi) long and its basin area is 2,860 square kilometres (1,104 sq mi). The Velyka Vys river finds its source near the village of Onykiieve in Novoukrainka Raion, Kirovohrad Oblast. It flows through Novomyrhorod.
