= Polesskoe offensive =

Soviet offensive operation

Polleskoe offensive/Battle of Kovel
- Part of Dnieper–Carpathian offensive
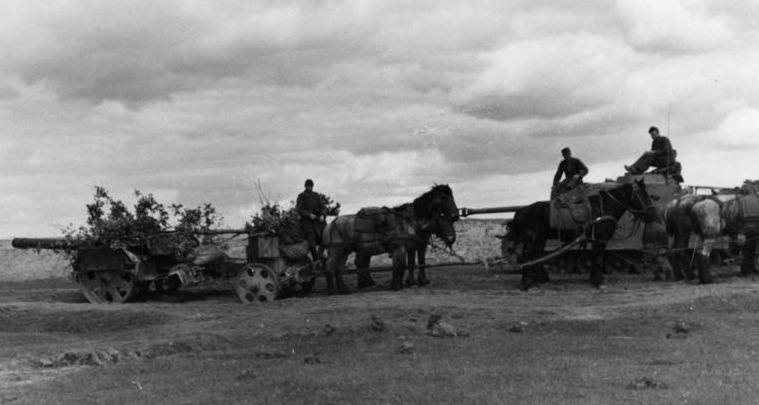
- German artillery and tanks are deployed in the combat area southwest of Kovel, March 1944.
Date	15 March – 5 April 1944
Location	Polesie region, Kovel, Ukraine
Result	German victory

Belligerents
Germany; Hungary	Soviet Union

Commanders and leaders
(Nazi Germany) Herbert Gille	(Soviet Union) Pavel Kurochkin

Units involved
Elements of: (Nazi Germany) 4th Panzer Army (Nazi Germany) 2nd Army	(Soviet Union) 2nd Belorussian Front

The Polesskoe offensive operation (Russian: Полесская наступательная операция, Polesskaya nastupatelnaya operatsiya), known on the German side as the Battle of Kovel (German: Schlacht um Kowel), was a major Soviet offensive operation, executed in the Polesie region between 15 March and 5 April 1944. Launched by the newly activated 2nd Belorussian Front, the offensive targeted the strategic rail hub of Kovel, located at the boundary line of the German Army Group Center and Army Group South. The primary strategic objective was to bypass Kovel, secure a path toward Brest, cut the Brest–Kovel highway, and threaten the deep rear of Army Group Center. It was part of a greater Dnieper-Carpathian strategic offensive.

The offensive started out successfully, with the 2nd Belorussian Front advancing 30–40 kilometers during the first four days of the offensive, crossing the Stokhod and Turya rivers. As a result, the German forces were pushed back towards the then Polish city of Kovel, a key town declared to be a fortress (Festung) by the Germans, which was encircled by Soviet units on 18 March 1944. The German High Command, recognizing the danger to the rear of Army Group Center and the possible consequences of the fall of Kovel garrison, took energetic measures to reinforce this sector. All told, between March–April 1944, the Germans transferred 9 divisions (including 2 panzer), 1 heavy panzer battalion and 2 StuG Assault Gun brigades from the main front of Army Group Center, which was protruding far to the east, to its far right flank located deep in the rear of the army group. Additionally, elements of the 5th SS Panzer Division Wiking, which was refitting west of Kovel after the breakout from the Korsun-Cherkassy pocket the previous month, were transferred for the relief operation.

Starting from 23 March, the German relief forces began to launch numerous attacks in order to break the siege of Kovel. A Kampfgruppe from the 5th SS-Panzer-Division Wiking under SS-Obersturmführer Karl Nicolussi-Leck, which consisted of 17 panthers and a bergepanther, along with an infantry battalion from SS-Panzergrenadier-Regiment Germania, set out to de-blockade Kovel. After gradual arrival of more reinforcements, the Kovel Garrison was de-blockaded by the German relief forces on 5 April, with Soviet forces being pushed back to the outskirts of Kovel, after which the front-lines stabilized. The trapped German forces began to withdraw on 10 April.

As a result of the operation, Soviet troops, in conditions of wooded and marshy terrain and muddy roads, advanced 30–40 km to the west, crossed the Stokhod and Turya rivers and advanced to the approaches of the towns of Ratno, Kovel, Turiysk. On the right wing, the forces of the 2nd Belorussian Front cleared the southern coast of Pripyat river from the German forces for a considerable distance. However, the Germans managed to keep in their hands the cities of Turov, Stolin, David-Gorodok. The poorly prepared attempt of the 47th Army to seize Kovel, a small Volyn town, but at the same time an important transport hub, which in the course of the battle suddenly acquired almost strategic importance, was ultimately unsuccessful. The Germans, on the contrary, managed to achieve a small, but important tactical victory, which stood out against the background of a whole series of heavy defeats suffered by Army Group South around the same time during the second stage of the Dnieper-Carpathian Offensive. As a result, of the 10 offensive operations during the winter-spring of 1944 in Ukraine, which comprised the Dnieper-Carpathian Offensive, the Polesskoe Offensive was the only one that did not achieve its goals.
