= Per Pedersen =

Per Pedersen is the name of:

- Per Pedersen Tjøstland (formerly Per Pedersen) (1918-2004), Norwegian Nazi activist
- Per Pedersen (footballer) (born 1969), Danish footballer
- Per Pedersen (cyclist) (born 1964), Danish road racing cyclist
