= 5th SS Panzer Division Wiking =

German armored division

- 5. SS-Panzerdivision Wiking
- Unit insignia
- Active: 1941–1945
- Country: Nazi Germany
- Branch: (Schutzstaffel) Waffen-SS
- Type: Infantry; Panzer
- Role: Armoured warfare
- Size: Division
- Engagements: World War II; Eastern Front; Operation Barbarossa; Case Blue; Third Battle of Kharkov; Operation Citadel; Operation Spring Awakening; Operation Harvest Festival

Commanders
- Notable commanders: Felix Steiner; Herbert Gille; Eduard Deisenhofer; Johannes Mühlenkamp; Karl Ullrich

The 5th SS Panzer Division Wiking (German: 5. SS-Panzerdivision Wiking) or SS Division Wiking was an infantry and later an armoured division among the thirty-eight Waffen-SS divisions of Nazi Germany. During World War II, the division served on the Eastern Front. It surrendered on 9 May 1945 to the American forces in Austria.

The division contained contingents of foreign volunteers from Northern European countries including, Denmark, Norway, Sweden, Finland, Estonia, Iceland, the Netherlands and Belgium. Although the role of foreign volunteers was played up by German wartime propaganda, the vast majority of the division’s personnel (over 90% at times) remained German, with the Nordic volunteers being from the “Westland” and “Nordland” SS regiments. Like other Waffen-SS divisions, Division Wiking participated in war crimes in Eastern Europe.

== Formation, training and demographics ==
After the German invasion of Poland in 1939, Heinrich Himmler, the head of the SS, sought to expand the Waffen-SS with foreign military volunteers for the Nazi "crusade against Bolshevism". The enrollment began in April 1940 with the creation of two regiments: the Waffen-SS Regiment Nordland (for Danish, Norwegian, Swedish and a minority of Icelandic volunteers), and the Waffen-SS Regiment Westland (for Dutch and Flemish volunteers).

The Nordic formation, originally organised as the Nordische Division (Nr. 5), was to be made up of Nordic volunteers mixed with German Waffen-SS personnel. The SS Infantry Regiment Germania of the SS-Verfügungs-Division, which was formed mostly from Germans, was transferred to help form the nucleus of a new division in late 1940. In December 1940, the new SS motorised formation was to be designated as SS-Division Germania, but after its formative period, the name was changed, to SS Division Wiking in January 1941. The division was formed around three motorised infantry regiments: Germania, Westland, and Nordland; with the addition of an artillery regiment. Command of the newly formed division was given to Felix Steiner, the former commander of the Verfügungstruppe SS Regiment Deutschland.

After formation, the division was sent to Heuberg in Germany for training; by April 1941, it was ready for combat. The division was ordered east in mid-May, to take part with Army Group South's advance into Ukraine during Operation Barbarossa, the invasion of the Soviet Union. In June 1941, the Finnish Volunteer Battalion of the Waffen-SS was formed from volunteers from that country. This unit was attached to the SS Regiment Nordland of the division. About 430 Finns who fought in the Winter War served in the SS Division Wiking from the beginning of Barbarossa. In spring 1943, the Finns' two-year contract ended, and the Finnish battalion was withdrawn. During that same timeframe, Regiment Nordland was transferred to help form the core of the new SS Division Nordland. They were replaced by the Estonian Battalion Narwa.

== Operational history ==
=== Invasion of the Soviet Union ===
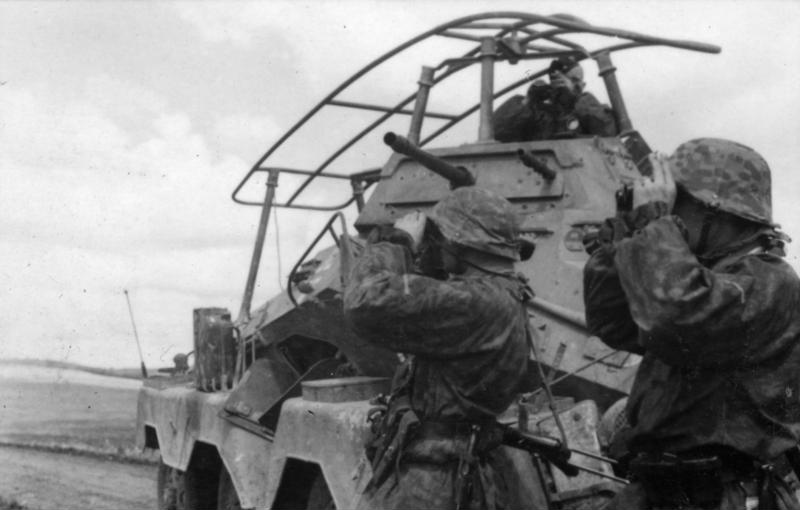
Troops of the division in the Soviet Union in 1941.

The division took part in Operation Barbarossa, the invasion of the Soviet Union, advancing through Galicia, today's Ukraine. In July and August, Wiking participated in the encirclement battles at Uman and Kiev. Later in August, the division fought for the bridgehead across the Dnieper River at Dnepropetrovsk. Finally, the division took part in the heavy fighting for Rostov-on-Don before retreating to the Mius River line in November, to hold for the winter.

In February 1942, the Soviet winter offensive had established breakthroughs on either side of the transportation hub of Izium. A Kampfgruppe was formed around the 1st battalion of the Germania regiment and the division's assault gun battery and sent north to help contain the Soviet thrusts. By the 25th of February, this Kampfgruppe was virtually annihilated in defensive battles near Izium against superior Soviet armored forces. Ultimately the front had been stabilized however, and conditions had been set for the devastating Axis counterattack at the Second Battle of Kharkov a few months later.

During the spring of 1942, the division received reinforcements for the coming offensive, including a battalion of Finnish infantry and a battery of StuG III's to replace earlier losses. In early June 1942, Wiking received its panzer battalion, making it among the first SS Divisions to be given its own armored contingent. The panzer battalion had just under sixty tanks, and was made up of two companies of Panzer IIIs and one company of Panzer IVs. The battalion was commanded by veteran SS officer Johannes Mühlenkamp.

In the summer of 1942, the unit took part in Army Group South's offensive Case Blue, with orders to capture Rostov and the Maikop oil fields. After capturing both targets, the division came to a halt in the foothills of the Caucasus on 14 August. In late September 1942, Wiking participated in the operation aimed to capture the city of Grozny, alongside the 13th Panzer Division. After much difficulty, the division captured the Malgobek ridge on 6 October, but the objective of seizing Grozny and opening a road to the Caspian Sea was not achieved. The division took part in the attempt to seize Ordzhonikidze. The Soviet Operation Uranus, the encirclement of the 6th Army at Stalingrad, brought any further advances to a halt and later necessitated a retreat from the Caucasus.

After Operation Winter Storm, the failed attempt to relieve the 6th Army, Erich von Manstein, the commander of Army Group South, proposed another attempt towards Stalingrad. To that end, Wiking entrained on 24 December; however, by the time it arrived at Zimovniki on 30 December, the Wehrmacht was retreating westwards. The Wiking Division was tasked with covering the retreat of Kleist's First Panzer Army back across the Don. Wiking held Simovniki for seven days, covering the retreat of several large German formations, taking high casualties in the process. The division escaped through the Rostov gap and took up a new defensive position at Stalino on 5 February.

=== Ukraine, 1943/44 ===
In early 1943, the division fell back to Ukraine south of Kharkov, recently abandoned by the II SS Panzer Corps commanded by Paul Hausser. In the remaining weeks of February, the Corps, including Wiking, engaged Mobile Group Popov, the major Soviet armoured force named after Markian Popov during the Third Battle of Kharkov. As the post-Stalingrad Soviet offensive exhausted itself, Manstein was able to stabilize the front.

In 1943, Herbert Gille was appointed to command the division. The SS Regiment Nordland, along with its commander Fritz von Scholz, were removed from the division and used as the nucleus for the new SS Division Nordland. The Finnish Volunteer Battalion was also withdrawn and they were replaced by the Estonian Battalion Narwa.

In the summer of 1943, the division, along with the 23rd Panzer Division, formed the reserve for Manstein's Army Group in Operation Citadel. Immediately following the German failure in the Battle of Kursk, the Red Army launched two counter-offensives, Operation Kutuzov and Operation Rumyantsev. Wiking, together with the SS Divisions Totenkopf and Das Reich, was sent to the Mius-Bogodukhov sector. The Soviets took Kharkiv on 23 August and began advancing towards the Dnieper. In October the division was pulled out to a quiet sector of the line just as the Dnieper–Carpathian Offensive overtook Army Group South.

In November 1943 the division participated in Operation Harvest Festival, engaging in the mass murder of thousands of Jews at Majdanek concentration camp.

In the aftermath of the fall of Kiev in late December 1943, the 1st and 2nd Ukrainian Fronts of the Red Army encircled several German divisions during the Battle of the Korsun–Cherkassy Pocket in January 1944. Over 60,000 soldiers, including the Wiking division, were trapped along the Dnieper River. Roughly half of German forces broke out of the encirclement. Similar to other formations in the pocket, Wiking suffered heavy casualties and lost nearly all of its heavy equipment.

In early March 1944, while still refitting after its ordeal in the Cherkassy Pocket, the division was ordered to the town of Kovel to help contain a Soviet breakthrough. Only a portion of the division's strength, equipped only with small arms, and the division commander Gruppenführer Herbert Gille, made it into Kovel before being surrounded by Soviet forces. A breakout was deemed impractical, as there were over 2,000 German wounded in the city.

By the end of March 1944, a relief force had been assembled outside of the pocket, led by Obersturmführer Karl Nicolussi-Leck. This force was built around the 8th Company of Wiking's 5th Panzer regiment, which had just received sixteen new Panther tanks. Fighting through determined Soviet resistance and heavy snow, the relief force broke through to the pocket on 30 March. Now able to be resupplied and receive reinforcements, Gille conducted counterattacks throughout April, culminating in the scattering of Soviet forces around Kovel on 24 April.

Through May, the division received replacements for earlier losses, including Panzer IVs, Stug IVs, and Panther tanks. In early June the division was ordered west, to new defensive positions at Maciejow. On 6 July, the Soviet armored advance reached Maciejow. Wiking's tanks and AT guns were well dug-in and camouflaged, and were able to destroy over 300 Soviet armored vehicles in three days of fighting. After bringing the Red Army's advance to a standstill in that sector, Wiking was dispatched to Poland on July 13, 1944.

=== Warsaw ===
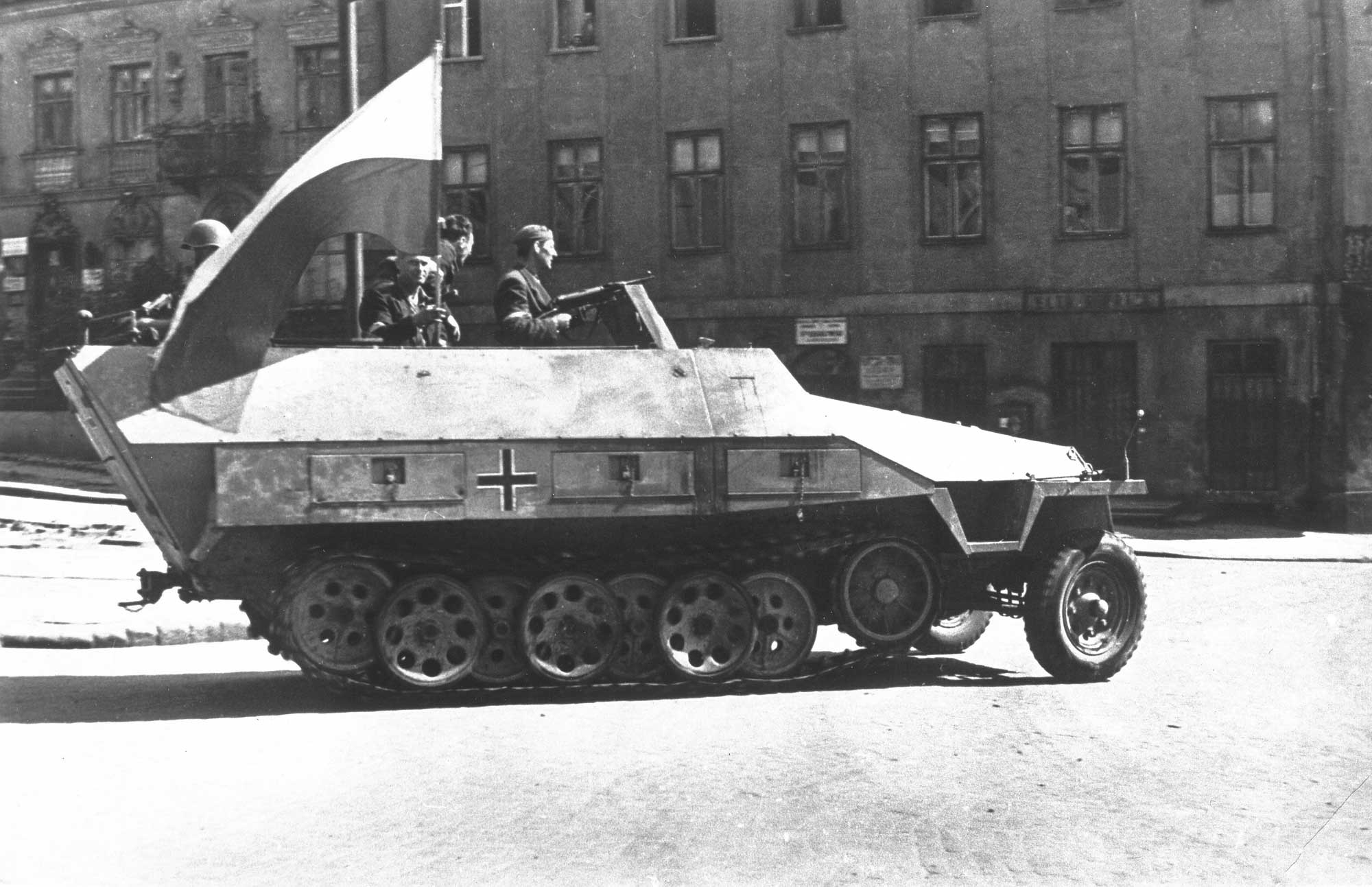
A German Sd.Kfz. 251 armoured fighting vehicle of the Wiking Division captured by the Polish insurgents

In late-August 1944, the division was ordered back to Modlin Fortress on the Vistula River line near Warsaw where it joined the newly formed Army Group Vistula. Fighting alongside the Luftwaffe's "Hermann Göring" Panzer Division and SS Division Totenkopf the division participated in the Battle of Radzymin. The German counterattacks brought the Soviet offensive to a halt and the front line stabilized for the rest of the year.

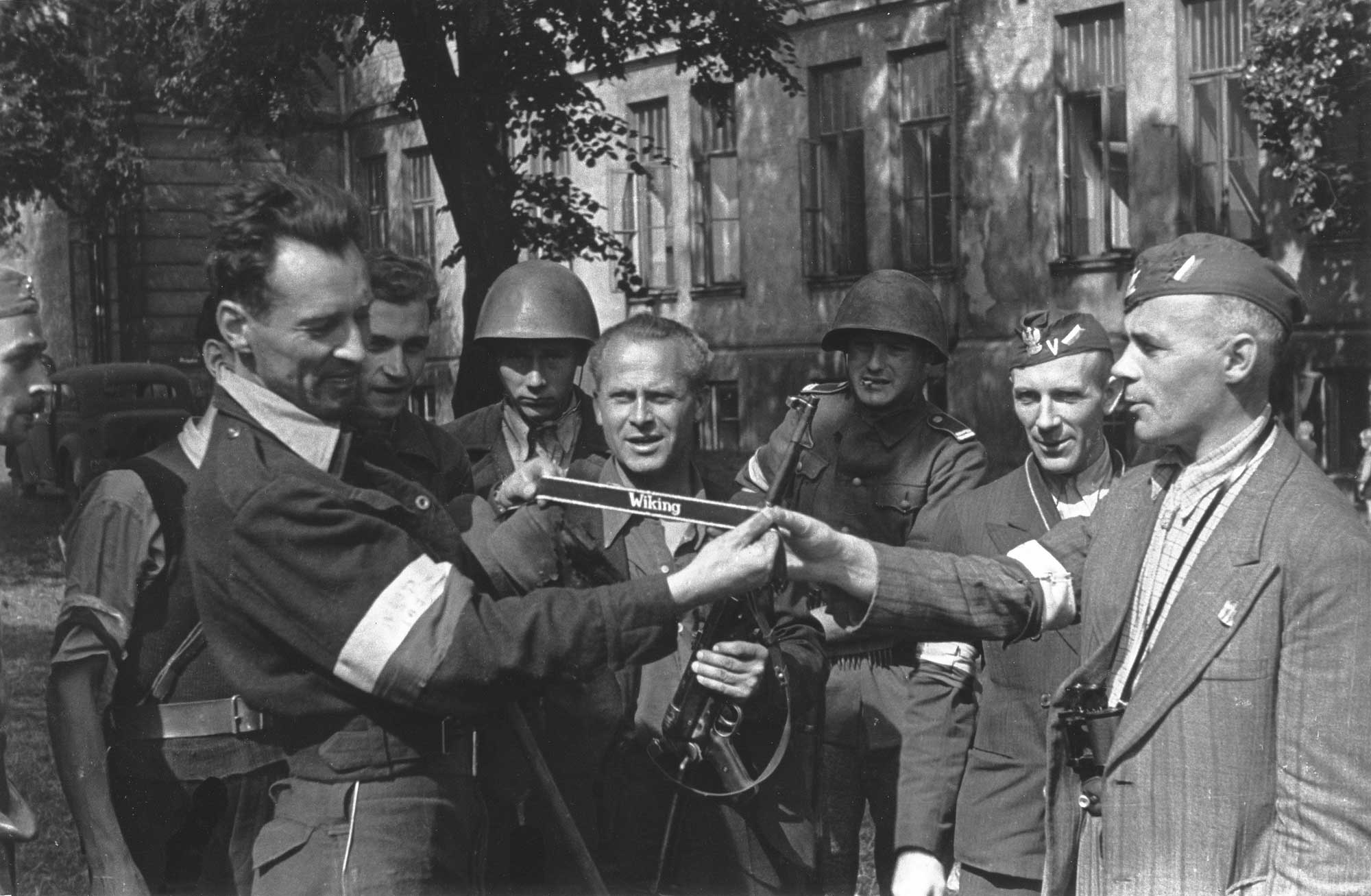
Warsaw Uprising insurgents inspect war trophies including an armband with the Wiking name

The division remained in the Modlin area, grouped with the 3 SS Totenkopf and the IV SS Panzer Corps. Gille was promoted to the command of the new SS Panzer Corps, and after a brief period with Oberführer Eduard Deisenhofer in command, Standartenführer Johannes Mühlenkamp, commander of the SS Panzer Regiment 5 Wiking, took command. Battles around Modlin followed for the rest of the year. In October, Mühlenkamp was replaced by Oberführer Karl Ullrich, who led the division for the rest of the war.

=== Hungary ===
In late-December 1944, the German forces, including IX SS Mountain Corps, were encircled in Budapest. The IV SS Panzer Corps was ordered south to join Hermann Balck's 6th Army for a relief effort codenamed Operation Konrad.

As a part of Operation Konrad I, the 5th SS Panzer Division Wiking was committed to action on 1 January 1945, fighting alongside the 3rd SS Panzer Division Totenkopf. Near Tata, the advance columns of the Wiking attacked the 4th Guards Army. The Soviet forces halted the German advance at Bicske, 28 kilometres from Budapest. After the failure of Konrad I, Wiking was moved south of Esztergom, near the Danube bend.

The second relief attempt, Operation Konrad II, got under way on 7 January with Wiking advancing south towards Budapest. By 12 January, the SS Panzergrenadier Regiment Westland had reached Pilisszentkereszt, 20 kilometres from Buda. Despite initial successes, the division was unable to exploit its breakthrough and was ordered to pull back and regroup.

A third attempt, Operation Konrad III, in cooperation with the III Panzer Corps, took place 100 kilometres to the south. It started on 20 January and achieved initial tactical success. The quick redeployment of more Red Army troops prevented a German breakthrough, turning the German forces back by 28 January. By the end of January, Wiking and Totenkopf had suffered 8,000 casualties, including 200 officers.

On 13 February 1945, the division was ordered west to Lake Balaton, where Oberstgruppenführer Sepp Dietrich's 6th SS Panzer Army was preparing Operation Spring Awakening, an offensive at Lake Balaton. Gille's remained as a support to the 6th SS Panzer Army during the beginning of the operation. Dietrich's army made "good progress" at first, but as they drew near the Danube, the combination of the muddy terrain and strong Soviet resistance ground them to a halt. The division performed a holding operation on the left flank of the offensive, in the area between Lake Velence-Székesfehérvár. As the operation progressed, the division was engaged in preventing Soviet efforts to outflank the advancing German forces. On 16 March, the Soviets forces counterattacked in overwhelming strength, causing the Germans to be driven back to their starting positions. On 24 March, another Soviet attack threw the IV SS Panzer Corps back towards Vienna; all contact was lost with the neighbouring I SS Panzer Corps, and any resemblance of an organised line of defence was gone. Wiking withdrew into Czechoslovakia. The division surrendered to the American forces near Fürstenfeld, Austria on 9 May.

== War crimes ==
Following the killing of Hilmar Wäckerle, one of the division's high ranking field officers, in the city of Lviv, Jews in the area were rounded up by members of the division's logistics units led by Obersturmführer Braunnagel and Untersturmführer Kochalty. A gauntlet was then formed by two rows of soldiers. Most of these soldiers were from the Wiking's logistics units, but some were members of the German 1st Mountain Division. The Jews were then forced to run down this path while being struck by rifle butts and bayonets. At the end of this path stood a number of SS and army officers who shot the Jews as soon as they entered a bomb crater being used as a mass grave. About 50 or 60 Jews were killed in this manner.

In addition, historian Eleonore Lappin, from the Institute for the History of Jews in Austria, has documented several cases of war crimes committed by members of Wiking in her work The Death Marches of Hungarian Jews Through Austria in the Spring of 1945. On 28 March 1945, 80 Jews from an evacuation column, although fit for the journey, were shot by three members of Wiking and five military policemen. On 4 April, 20 members of another column that left Graz tried to escape near the town of Eggenfelden, not far from Gratkorn. Troops from the division stationed there apprehended them in the forest near Mt. Eggenfeld, then herded them into a gully, where they were shot. On 7–11 April 1945, members of the division executed another eighteen escaped prisoners.

In 1943, elements of the division participated in the suppression of the Warsaw Ghetto Uprising and in Operation Harvest Festival.

In 2013 the NRK quoted "the first Norwegian [to publicly admit] that he participated in war crimes and extermination of Jews in Eastern Europe" during World War II, former soldier of the division Olav Tuff, who admitted: "In one instance in Ukraine during the autumn of 1941, civilians were herded like cattle—into a church. Shortly afterwards soldiers from my unit started to pour gasoline onto the church and somewhere between 200 and 300 humans were burned inside [the church]. I was assigned as guard, and no one came out."

The 2014 Norwegian book Morfar, Hitler og jeg (Grandfather, Hitler and I) quotes the diary of a division soldier from 1941 to 1943: "and then we cleaned a Jew hole".

== Organisation ==
=== Commanders ===
No.	Portrait	Commander	Took office	Left office	Time in office
1	Felix Steiner	SS-Obergruppenführer; Felix Steiner (1896–1966)	1 December 1940	1 May 1943	2 years, 151 days
2	Herbert Gille	SS-Gruppenführer; Herbert Gille (1897–1966)	1 May 1943	6 August 1944	1 year, 97 days
3	Eduard Deisenhofer	SS-Standartenführer; Eduard Deisenhofer (1909–1945)	6 August 1944	12 August 1944	6 days
4	Johannes-Rudolf Mühlenkamp	SS-Standartenführer; Johannes-Rudolf Mühlenkamp (1910–1986)	12 August 1944	9 October 1944	58 days
5	Karl Ullrich	SS-Oberführer; Karl Ullrich (1910–1996)	9 October 1944	5 May 1945	208 days

=== Order of battle ===
The organisation structure of this SS formation was as follows:

- SS-Panzergrenadierregiment 9 "Germania"
- SS-Panzergrenadierregiment 10 "Westland"
- SS-Panzerregiment 5
- SS-Panzerartillerieregiment 5
- 5th SS Panzer Division Structure (1940):
  - SS Regiment Germania
    - 1. Battalion
    - 2. Battalion
    - 3. Battalion
  - SS Regiment Nordland
    - 1. Battalion
    - 2. Battalion
    - 3. Battalion
  - SS Regiment Westland
    - 1. Battalion
    - 2. Battalion
    - 3. Battalion
  - 5. SS Artillerie
    - 1. Battalion
    - 2. Battalion
    - 3. Battalion
    - 4. Battalion
  - 5. SS Support Battalion
  - 5. SS Engineer Battalion
  - 5. SS Tank-Destroyer Battalion
  - 5. SS Anti-Tank Battalion
  - 1. Sanitary Company
  - 2. Sanitary Company
  - 1. Defense and Works Company
  - 2. Defense and Works Company
  - 3. Defense and Works Company

== See also ==
- List of Waffen-SS divisions
- SS Panzer Division order of battle
- Battle of Jaworów – the final battle of SS Germania regiment
- Per Pedersen Tjøstland
- Waffen-SS in popular culture
