= Karl Ullrich =

SS officer & last commander of the SS Division Wiking (1910–1996)

- Ullrich as an SS-Standartenführer
- Born: 1 December 1910; Saargemünd,German Empire (today Sarreguemines,France)
- Died: 8 May 1996 (aged 85)
- Military career
- Allegiance: Nazi Germany
- Branch: Waffen-SS
- Service years: 1934–45
- Rank: SS-Oberführer
- Service number: NSDAP #715,727; SS #31,438
- Unit: SS Division Totenkopf
- Commands: SS Division Wiking
- Conflicts: World War II
- Awards: Knight's Cross of the Iron Cross with Oak Leaves

Karl Ullrich (1 December 1910 – 8 May 1996) was the last commander of the SS Division Wiking in the Waffen-SS during World War II. After the war he authored an account of the SS Division Totenkopf.

== Early life ==
Karl Ullrich was born on December 1, 1910 in Saargemünd, Germany, although it would become part of France after World War I. He apprenticed at both an engineering firm and electrical firm before attending technical school to study engineering, qualifying as a mechanical engineer in 1933. Ullrich joined the Reichswehr briefly in 1933 before joining the SS-Verfügungstruppe (SS-VT) in 1934. He became an NCO that year, and the following year was selected for officer training. In 1936 he was commissioned as an SS-Untersturmführer and proceeded to the army's Pioneer School because of his engineering background. Prior to the outbreak of the war, Ullrich took part in the occupations of Austria and the Sudetenland as well as being promoted to SS-Hauptsturmführer.

== World War II ==
Leading his pioneer company in both the Polish and Western campaign, he earned the Iron Cross second and first class in quick succession. Staying with his unit for the Greek campaign, in May 1941 he was transferred to the SS Division Totenkopf, where he took command of 3rd pioneer battalion.

In early 1942, the division found itself trapped in the Demyansk Pocket. Ullrich commanded a battlegroup holding a bridge over the river Lovat winning the Knight's Cross for the holding of the position despite being encircled. Following the breakout from the pocket, he was appointed commander of Pioneers for the SS-Panzerkorps, a position he held during the 42/43 winter battles in and around Kharkov, after which he requested a return to Totenkopf being given command of SS Panzer Grenadier Regiment 5 "Thule" in time for the lead up to Kursk operation. Promoted again toward the end of 1943 and appointed commander of SS Panzer Grenadier Regiment 6 "Theodor Eicke", the unit fought the battles of 1943/1944 being pushed back constantly. In March 1944, the Soviets succeeded in breaking through the lines, Ullrich drew whatever troops were available and fought off the attack, halting the breakthrough, in the process earning the Oakleaves to his Knight's Cross.

He was given command of the SS Division Wiking in October 1944, fighting around Warsaw before being moved to Hungary in December, attempting to relieve the 8th SS Cavalry Division "Florian Geyer" and 22nd SS Volunteer Cavalry Division Maria Theresia. Following the failure of the relief of Budapest, the division took part in the battle around Lake Balaton as part of 6th Panzer Army. The 6th Panzer Army then withdrew west into Austria in a rearguard action. A short time before the end of the war he was promoted to Oberführer and he surrendered to the Americans in May 1945.

== Post-war ==
After three years in American captivity, Ullrich was released. He died on 8 May 1996 in Bad Reichenhall, Germany.

After the war, Ullrich wrote the book Like a Cliff in the Ocean: A History of the 3. SS-Panzer-Division "Totenkopf" in which he claimed that only a single member of the Totenkopf division ever committed a war crime.

== Works ==
- Karl Ullrich (2002): Like a Cliff in the Ocean, J.J. Fedorowicz Publishing, ISBN 0-921991-69-X

== Awards ==
- Iron Cross (1939) 2nd Class (18 May 1940) & 1st Class (1 July 1940)
- Knight's Cross of the Iron Cross with Oak Leaves
  - Knight's Cross on 19 February 1942 as SS-Sturmbannführer and commander of SS-Pionier-Bataillon 3 "Totenkopf"
  - 480th Oak Leaves on 14 May 1944 as SS-Obersturmbannführer and commander of SS-Panzergrenadier-Regiment 6 "Theodor Eicke"

Military offices
| Preceded by SS-Standartenführer Johannes Mühlenkamp | Commander of 5. SS-Panzer-Division Wiking; 9 October 1944 – 5 May 1945 | Succeeded by disbanded |
