= Eduard Deisenhofer =

Nazi commander (1909–1945)

- Deisenhofer in 1942
- Born: 27 June 1909
- Died: MIA 31 January 1945 (aged 35) disappeared near Arnswalde, Nazi Germany
- Military career
- Allegiance: Nazi Germany
- Branch: Waffen-SS
- Service years: 1930–1945
- Rank: SS-Oberführer
- Service number: NSDAP #250,226; SS #3,642
- Units: SS-VT; SS Division Totenkopf; SS Division Frundsberg; SS Division Wiking; SS Division Götz von Berlichingen
- Conflicts: World War II
- Awards: Knight's Cross of the Iron Cross

Eduard Deisenhofer (27 June 1909 – MIA 31 January 1945) was a German commander in the Waffen-SS of Nazi Germany. He was an early member in the SS, and served with the Leibstandarte SS Adolf Hitler and at the Dachau concentration camp in 1930s. During World War II, Deisenhofer served with several combat divisions on both the Eastern and Western fronts, earning the Knight's Cross of the Iron Cross. He held a PhD in political economy.

== Early SS career ==
Deisenhofer received his PhD as a political economist. During his time at university, he had come into contact with the Nazi Party, and soon applied to join the Sturmabteilung (SA). A few months with the SA, Deisenhofer transferred to the Schutzstaffel (SS), beginning his service on 1 October 1930. Deisenhofer held various low level command positions, including service with the Leibstandarte SS Adolf Hitler in 1934 and at the Dachau concentration camp in 1935. Over the next two years he served in both the Totenkopfverbände units SS Totenkopf Verbande Sachsen and SS Totenkopf Standarte Thuringen.

== World War II ==
At the outbreak of war Deisenhofer served in the SS Totenkopf Standarte, which was responsible for the police and security measures during the Invasion of Poland. After the Polish campaign, his unit was absorbed into the newly formed SS Division Totenkopf, where he served as a battalion commander during the Campaign in the West, receiving the Iron Cross First Class for his bravery in combat. In May Deisenhofer was appointed commander of a battalion of the newly formed Dutch and Belgian volunteer formation SS Volunteer Standarte Nordwest.

In August 1941, Deisenhofer was transferred to the command of the Regiment Germania, one of the Infantry regiments of the SS Division Wiking, currently serving on the Eastern Front. Deisenhofer was sent back to the Totenkopf division in February 1942 as a regimental commander. The division was encircled in the Demyansk Pocket, where he commanded a battle group during the breakout, receiving a Knight's Cross of the Iron Cross for his actions. Deisenhofer then served as an SS training officer. In March 1944, Deisenhofer was sent back to a combat formation, this time to command a regiment of the 10th SS Panzer Division Frundsberg, which took part in the operation to relieve the encircled 1st Panzer Army of Generaloberst Hans-Valentin Hube in what was known as the Kamenets-Podolsky pocket.

The Frundsberg was sent to the Normandy to attempt to halt the advance of Field Marshal Bernard Montgomery's 21st Army Group, currently advancing on Caen. Deisenhofer's unit saw action during Operation Epsom, which resulted in German defeat. In mid July, Deisenhofer was ordered back east to take command of the SS Division Wiking, currently engaged in heavy fighting in the area near Modlin. However, he was rejected by SS General Herbert Gille, the new commander of the IV SS Panzer Korps, who decided to keep Standartenführer Johannes Mühlenkamp in place as commander of the Wiking Division. At the end of August, he took over command of the 17th SS Panzergrenadier Division Götz von Berlichingen. Near the end of January, Deisenhofer disappeared when traveling to a new command post. His staff car was attacked by a Soviet Ground Attack Aircraft. He was classified as missing in action.

== See also ==
- List of people who disappeared

== Summary of SS career ==
- NSDAP #: 250,226
- SS-#: 3,642

Awards

- German Cross in Gold (1942)
- Iron Cross Second (1940) and First (1940) Classes
- Knight's Cross of the Iron Cross on 8 May 1942 as SS-Sturmbannführer and commander of the I./SS-"Totenkopf"-Infanterie-Regiment 1.

Military offices
Preceded by SS-Obergruppenführer Herbert Otto Gille	Commander of 5. SS-Panzer-Division Wiking; 6 August 1944 – August 1944	Succeeded by SS-Standartenführer Johannes Mühlenkamp
