= Karl Nicolussi-Leck =

SS officer (1917–2008)

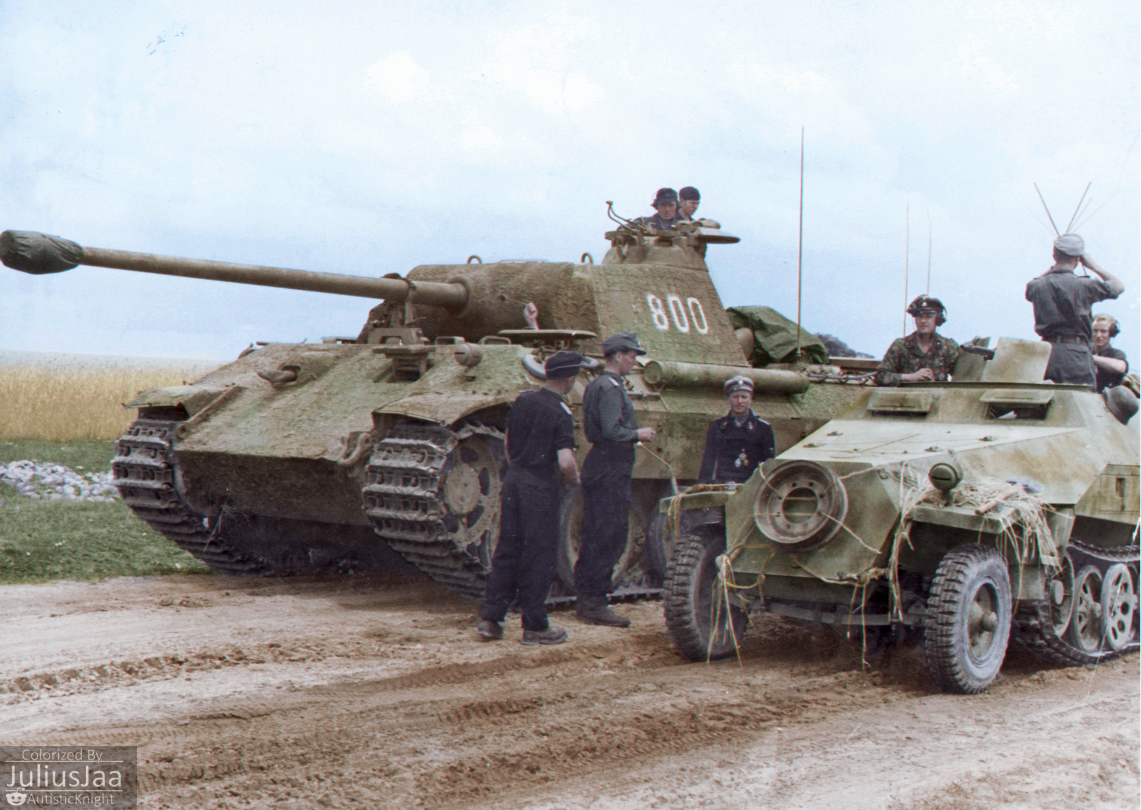
- Nicolussi-Leck (centre), near Warsaw (1944)
- Born: 14 March 1917; Vadena
- Died: 30 August 2008 (aged 91)
- Occupations: Waffen-SS commander Nazi activist
- Awards: Knight's Cross of the Iron Cross

Karl Nicolussi-Leck (14 March 1917 – 30 August 2008) was a mid-ranking Panzer commander in the Waffen-SS of Nazi Germany during World War II. In the post-war years, he helped many Waffen-SS soldiers flee Europe.

== Political and post-war life ==
In the late interwar period, Nicolussi-Leck helped to found the Nazi movement Völkischer Kampfring Südtirol which opposed the Fascist attempts to Italianise his native, widely German-speaking region South Tyrol, annexed by Italy in 1919, and backed in 1939 the South Tyrol Option Agreement. In January 1940, Nicolussi-Leck volunteered for the Waffen-SS and served in the SS divisions Das Reich and Wiking. He was awarded the Knight's Cross of the Iron Cross for his actions during the Soviet Polesskoe offensive and encirclement of the Polish city of Kowel. After the war, Nicolussi-Leck helped many Waffen-SS soldiers leave Europe for South America. He emigrated to Argentina in 1948, but returned in the early 1950s to the South Tyrol, his native region, where he worked as an entrepreneur for Mannesmann.

== Death ==
Karl Nicolussi-Leck died in 2008, in Bolzano (Bozen), Italy.
