= Johannes-Rudolf Mühlenkamp =

German SS officer (1910–1986)

- Born: 9 October 1910; Montigny-lès-Metz, German Empire
- Died: 23 September 1986 (aged 75); Goslar, West Germany
- Military career
- Allegiance: Nazi Germany
- Branch: Waffen-SS
- Service years: 1933–1945
- Rank: SS-Standartenführer
- Service number: NSDAP #2,800,042; SS #86,065
- Commands: SS Division Wiking
- Conflicts: World War II
- Awards: Knight's Cross of the Iron Cross with Oak Leaves

Johannes-Rudolf Mühlenkamp (9 October 1910 – 23 September 1986) was a German Waffen-SS officer and divisional commander during World War II who led SS Division Wiking. He was a recipient of the Knight's Cross of the Iron Cross with Oak Leaves.

== Early life ==
Mühlenkamp was born in 1910 in the city of Metz, at the time part of the German Empire but which reverted to French control after WW I. Mühlenkamp joined the NSDAP (Nazi Party) and the Schutzstaffel (SS) in April 1933 while living in Hamburg. In the following year, September 1934, he began his military career, joining the SS-Verfügungstruppe or SS-VT (later known as the Waffen-SS), and being assigned to the Germania Regiment. After a year as an enlisted member, Mühlenkamp attended the SS Junkerschule to train as an officer, graduating as an Untersturmführer in 1936. After Junkerschule, he was attached to the German army's 2nd Panzer Division to train with their motorcycle units. Returning to the SS-VT in May, Mühlenkamp was posted again to the Germania Regiment, as platoon leader in November 1937 after promotion to Obersturmführer, before taking command of the Motorcycle Company in May 1938.

== World War II ==
Mühlenkamp took part in the Polish campaign as a Hauptsturmführer and commander of the Motorcycle Company of Germania, earning the Iron Cross 2nd class on 3 October, and the 1st class on 11 November. After Poland Deutschland Germania and Der Führer Regiments were reorganized to form SS Verfügungs-Division (later Reich and Das Reich), and Mühlenkamp became the Divisional Adjutant under Paul Hausser, serving as the commander of the Reconnaissance Battalion in the Western and Balkan Campaigns as well as the invasion of the Soviet Union. He received the German Cross in gold while recovering from a severe head wound on 2 January 1942. On his release from hospital, Mühlenkamp was posted to 5 SS Panzer Grenadier Division Wiking in command of its new Panzer Battalion. On 3 September he was awarded the Knight's Cross in recognition of his command during the divisions drive south that year, and in particular Wiking's part in the capture of Rostov. After being wounded again in early 1943, Mühlenkamp returned to Germany to organize a second tank battalion and regimental headquarters for Wiking. His battalion grew to a regiment and Mühlenkamp was promoted to Standartenführer. He assumed command of Wiking in August 1944. His first weeks in command were spent fighting in the Warsaw area for which he received the Oakleaves to the Knight's Cross on 21 September 1944.

Mühlenkamp was made Inspector of Waffen-SS Panzer Troops in October 1944, with Karl Ullrich replacing him as divisional commander. In 1945 he was tasked with raising a new division, 32nd SS Volunteer Grenadier Division 30 Januar, which he commanded during its work up in January and February, resuming his Inspectorate afterwards.

== Post war ==
Mühlenkamp died on 23 September 1986 in Langelsheim-Bredelm, West Germany.

== Awards ==
- Iron Cross 2nd class (3 October 1939) & 1st class (11 November 1939)
- German Cross in Gold on 2 January 1942 as SS-Hauptsturmführer in the Aufklärungs-Abteilung SS-Division "Reich"
- Knight's Cross of the Iron Cross with Oak Leaves
  - Knight's Cross on 3 September 1942 as SS-Sturmbannführer and commander of the SS-Panzer-Abteilung 5 "Wiking"
  - 596th Oak Leaves on 21 September 1944 as SS-Standartenführer and division leader of the 5. SS-Panzer-Division "Wiking"
- Wound Badge in gold on 13 January 1943

Military offices
| Preceded by SS-Oberführer Eduard Deisenhofer | Commander of 5. SS-Panzer-Division Wiking; August 1944 – 9 October 1944 | Succeeded by SS-Oberführer Karl Ullrich |
