= Dnieper–Carpathian offensive =

1944 Soviet offensive on the Eastern Front of WW2

- Part of the Eastern Front of World War II
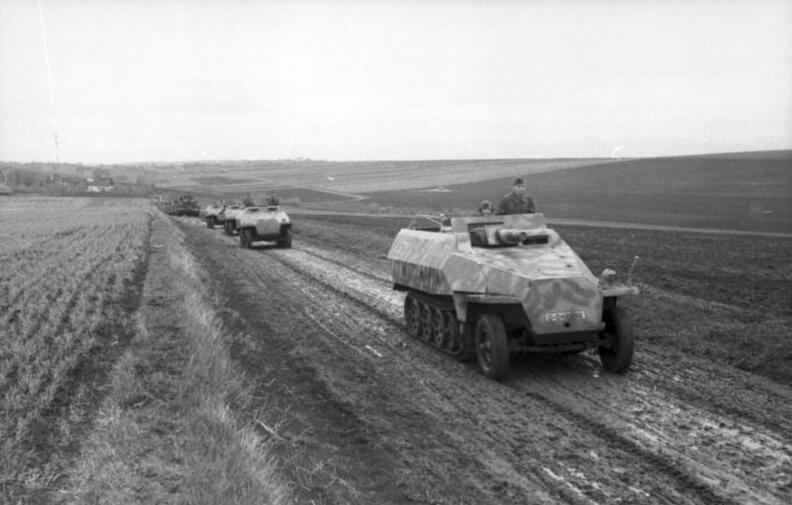
- German Sd.Kfz. 251 half-tracks on the move during defensive battles in Ukraine, early 1944.
Date	24 December 1943 – 6 May 1944 (4 months, 1 week and 5 days); Winter phase (1st stage): 24 December 1943 – 29 February 1944; Spring phase (2nd stage): 4 March – 17 April (for the 1st Ukrainian Front) – 6 May 1944 (for the 2nd and 3rd Ukrainian Front)
Location	Right-bank Ukraine, Southern Ukraine, Western Ukraine, Polesia. Eastern Poland, northern Romania.
Result	Soviet victory
Territorial changes	Soviets reclaim most of the Ukrainian SSR, expulsion of Axis forces; Red Army enters Romania and Eastern Poland

Belligerents
Soviet Union (Czechoslovakia) Czechoslovak Army Corps	Germany; Romania; Hungary

Commanders and leaders
(Soviet Union) Joseph Stalin (Soviet Union) Georgy Zhukov (Soviet Union) Nikolai Vatutin † (Soviet Union) Ivan Konev (Soviet Union) Aleksandr Vasilevsky (Soviet Union) Rodion Malinovsky (Soviet Union) Feodor Tolbukhin (Soviet Union) Pavel Kurochkin (Soviet Union) Lev Vladimirsky	(Nazi Germany) Adolf Hitler (Nazi Germany) Erich von Manstein (Nazi Germany) Walther Model (Nazi Germany) Ewald von Kleist (Nazi Germany) Ferdinand Schörner (Nazi Germany) Hans-Valentin Hube (Nazi Germany) Erhard Raus (Nazi Germany) Otto Wöhler (Nazi Germany) Karl-Adolf Hollidt (Nazi Germany) Wilhelm Stemmermann † (Kingdom of Romania) Petre Dumitrescu (Kingdom of Romania) Ioan Mihail Racoviță (Kingdom of Hungary (1920–1946)) Géza Lakatos

Units involved
(Soviet Union) 1st Ukrainian Front (Soviet Union) 2nd Ukrainian Front (Soviet Union) 3rd Ukrainian Front (Soviet Union) 4th Ukrainian Front (until February 1944) (Soviet Union) 2nd Belorussian Front (from March 1944)	(Nazi Germany) Army Group South: (Nazi Germany) 1st Panzer Army; (Nazi Germany) 4th Panzer Army; (Nazi Germany) 8th Army; (Kingdom of Hungary (1920–1946)) VII Army Corps (Dec. 1943 - Mar. 1944); (Kingdom of Hungary (1920–1946)) 1st Army (from April 1944); (Nazi Germany) Army Group A: (Nazi Germany) 6th Army; (Kingdom of Romania) 3rd Army; (Kingdom of Romania) 4th Army (from April 1944); (Nazi Germany) Army Group Center: (Nazi Germany) 2nd Army (from March 1944)

Strength
(Soviet Union) On 24 December 1943: 2,406,100 personnel 2,015 operational tanks and self-propelled guns 28,654 guns and mortars 2,600 aircraft (Soviet Union) On 1 March 1944: 2,111,987 personnel 2,652 operational tanks and self-propelled guns 611 tanks and self-propelled guns in repair 27,718 guns and mortars 1,621 aircraft	(Nazi Germany) Army Group South, late 1943 – early 1944: 1,156,325 personnel in total on 1 January 1944 (ration strength); AFV status on 20 December 1943: 605 operational tanks; 1,101 tanks in repair; 423 operational assault guns; 339 assault guns in repair Luftflotte 4 status on 20 January 1944: 625 operational combat aircraft; 849 combat aircraft in total (incl. in repairs); 264 operational non-combat aircraft; 322 non-combat aircraft in total (incl. in repairs); (Nazi Germany) On 1 March 1944: 915,721 personnel (Kingdom of Romania) 300,000+ personnel (April 1944); 3,235 guns and mortars 1,344 anti-tank guns (Kingdom of Hungary (1920–1946)) VII Army Corps on 1 February 1944: 51,400 personnel 1st Army in April 1944: 150,000–180,000 personnel 30 operational tanks 30 operational assault guns 75 tanks in repairs

Casualties and losses
270,198 killed or missing 839,330 wounded & sick 4,666 tanks/assault guns destroyed 7,532 artillery pieces lost 676 aircraft destroyed Total: 1,109,528 (including ~850,000 combat casualties)	Germany; Frieser: 41,907 killed 157,888 wounded 51,161 missing Total: 250,956 (incomplete); OKH Report: 379,688 total casualties (incl. evacuated sick); 2nd Army losses in the Kovel area: ~10,000 killed, wounded and missing (March-April 1944); Grylev: 500,000 total casualties Hungary; VII Corps, January-February 1944: 257 killed 546 wounded 837 missing 1st Army, 17-30 April 1944: 15,571 killed, wounded and missing in total Romania Exact unknown

The Dnieper–Carpathian Operation (Russian: Днепровско-Карпатская операция), known on the German side as the Defensive battles in Southern Ukraine and west of Kiev (German: Abwehrschlachten in der Südukraine und westlich Kiew), was a strategic offensive executed in right-bank, southern, and western Ukraine by the Soviet 1st, 2nd, 3rd, and 4th Ukrainian Fronts, along with the 2nd Belorussian Front, against the German Army Group South, most of Army Group A and parts of Army Group Center. Fought from late December 1943 to early May 1944, this campaign in the southern sector was the focal point of the entire 1944 winter-spring campaign on the Eastern Front. This was the only offensive in which all six Soviet tank armies participated at the same time, while 22 out of the 30 panzer and panzer-grenadier divisions available to the Germans on the Eastern Front in late 1943 were stationed in Ukraine.

Consisting of a series of linked operations, the offensive aimed to split Army Group South and clear Axis forces from Ukrainian territories west of the Dnieper. It was one of the largest offensives of World War II, spanning a 1,200 km (745 mi) front to a depth of 450 km (280 mi) and involving almost 3,500,000 troops from both sides In the course of it, 20 Wehrmacht divisions were either destroyed or rendered combat-ineffective, while all the rest were severely depleted. Even worse were material losses, with thousands of armoured vehicles, motor vehicles and artillery lost, principally through abandonment in the spring mud. According to German General Kurt von Tippelskirch, this was the biggest Wehrmacht defeat since Stalingrad. The offensive split Army Group South north and south of the Carpathian Mountains. The northern portion was pushed into Galicia and renamed Army Group North Ukraine, while the southern portion retreated into Romania and became Army Group South Ukraine, effective 5 April 1944, though little of Ukraine remained in German hands. During this advance, the Red Army reached the pre-invasion June 1941 Soviet borders for the first time. The defeat prompted Hitler to dismiss Army Group South commander Erich von Manstein, and Army Group A commander Ewald von Kleist, replaced by Walther Model and Ferdinand Schörner respectively, ending Manstein's career.

To save the southern sector from collapse, the German command transferred eight divisions in the winter of 1943-44 and another 26 German divisions as reinforcements that spring from across occupied Europe and other Eastern Front army groups. This amounted to 34 divisions, over 350,000 troops and at least 1,200 armoured vehicles. Consequently, this offensive played a key role in influencing the future successes of the Allied Normandy landings and the Soviet Operation Bagration, as German forces in France and Army Group Centre were critically weakened by the transfers. During the Kamenets-Podolsky pocket crisis, OB West was deprived of 45,827 troops and 363 armored vehicles on 6 June 1944. Meanwhile, Army Group Center was stripped of 125,380 troops and 552 armoured vehicles on 22 June 1944. Additionally, as the Red Army approached the borders of Hungary and Romania, both countries mobilized and committed a combined total of 25 divisions.

The Soviet success convinced the German command that the southern sector would host the main Soviet 1944 summer offensive. Consequently, southern forces—especially the panzer divisions—received priority reinforcements. This expectation was driven by the new front line, which created a westward-protruding "Ukrainian Balcony" and left Army Group Centre in an exposed, eastward-facing "Belorussian Balcony". This layout, combined with the weakening of Army Group Centre during the Polesskoe offensive, had catastrophic consequences for the Germans during Operation Bagration.

== Background ==
Following the autumn 1943 Battle of the Dnieper, which secured Left-bank or eastern Ukraine and isolated the German 17th Army in Crimea, the Red Army established and expanded several bridgeheads on the right bank. These positions served as the launching pads for the subsequent Dnieper–Carpathian Offensive.

One of these bridgeheads centered around Kiev was up to 240 km wide and 120 km deep, and was occupied by the troops of the 1st Ukrainian Front. The other, in the region of Cherkasy, Znamenka, and Dnepropetrovsk, was up to 350 km wide and 30 to 100 km deep, and was occupied by troops of the 2nd and 3rd Ukrainian fronts. Meanwhile, the troops of the 4th Ukrainian Front reached the lower reaches of the Dnieper in the Kakhovka-Tsyurupinsk sector, and had cut off the German 17th Army stationed in the Crimean peninsula, while also seizing a bridgehead on the southern coast of Sivash.

== Forces involved and their plans ==
=== Axis ===
After a heavy defeat in the summer-autumn campaign of 1943, the German forces adopted a posture of strategic defense. The main line of the strategic behavior of the German forces on the Soviet-German front was stubborn defense in order to keep the occupied lines. Plans for stubborn defense on the Soviet-German front were determined by political and, most importantly, economic factors.

By holding the lines in Ukraine, the German High Command, Hitler foremost, hoped to prevent the German allies, namely Romania, Hungary and Bulgaria, from leaving the Axis military-political bloc. German General Kurt von Tippelskirch wrote the following:

The front was rapidly approaching the Balkans. We had to fear that if events continued to develop with the same speed, Romania, Bulgaria and Hungary, despite their fear of Bolshevism, would become unreliable allies. The example of Italy was in this sense highly indicative.

The most important reason for holding the right-bank Ukraine was economic. The control of Ukraine allowed the German leadership to export food and important strategic raw materials to Germany. In their calculations for stubborn defense, the Germans attached particular importance to the retention of the right-bank Ukraine and Crimea with their rich food resources, manganese production centers around Nikopol, iron ore production centers around Krivoy Rog and Kerch, as well as the Black Sea basin with first-class seaports.

The German command took into account the important strategic position of the right bank of Ukraine and Crimea, as areas covering the approaches to southern Poland and the Balkans and ensuring control over the central and western parts of the Black Sea.

Erich von Manstein's Army Group South and Ewald von Kleist's Army Group A consisted of 2 panzer and 2 field armies (from north to south):

- 4th Panzer Army in the Zhitomir region, west of Kiev, commanded by Erhard Raus;
- 1st Panzer Army of Hans-Valentin Hube, in the Vinnitsa region and as far as Cherkassy to the south;
- 8th Army commanded by Otto Wöhler in the region of Kirovograd;
- 6th Army (recreated after its destruction at Stalingrad) under Karl-Adolf Hollidt in the Krivoy-Rog-Nikopol salient.

The German forces were also supported by the following Axis armies:

- 3rd Romanian Army, also rebuilt after Stalingrad, under command of Petre Dumitrescu in the Tavridia area, just north of Crimea;
- 4th Romanian Army hastily assembled under command of Ioan Mihail Racoviţă in the area of Soviet Moldavian Republic;
- 1st Hungarian Army, held in reserve in the north-western Ukraine.

All told, on the right-bank Ukraine the combined German-Romanian-Hungarian forces had a total of 93 divisions (including 18 panzer and 4 panzer-grenadier), 2 motorized brigades, 3 heavy panzer battalions of Tiger tanks, 18 StuG Assault Gun Brigades, a battalion of "Ferdinand" or Elefant tank destroyer, several anti-tank battalions, as well as a large number of artillery, construction, engineering and other units. In general, this amounted to 40% of all German troops and 72% of all panzer divisions stationed on the Eastern Front. Army Group South was supported by the Luftwaffe's Luftflotte 4 (1st, 4th and 8th Air Corps), as well as the bulk of the Romanian Air Force. The headquarters of the Luftflotte 4 was in Proskurov, the 8th Air Corps in Vinnitsa, the 4th Air Corps in Balta, the 1st Air Corps in Pervomaisk, and the headquarters of the Romanian Air Corps in Odessa.

All along the vast front, the Germans hastily built defenses. The main defense zone with a depth of 4–6 km had a developed system of trenches, communications and various kinds of engineering barriers. On the most important directions, 6–15 km from the front line, a second line of defense was built. In the operational depth along the banks of the Goryn, Southern Bug, Ingulets, Dniester and Prut rivers, new fortifications were erected while the available fortifications were modernized.

The German forces operating on the right-bank Ukraine intended not only to keep the occupied lines, but also to try and liquidate the Soviet bridgeheads on the right bank of the Dnieper, as well as to strike from the Nikopol bridgehead to the south and from the Crimea to the north, in order to re-establish a land connection with the German forces stationed in Crimea.

By the end of 1943, the German forces operating in Ukraine were driven back to the line of Ovruch, Radomyshl, Kanev, Bashtina, Marganets, Kachachrovka. On the left bank of the Dnieper, south of Nikopol, the Germans kept a bridgehead with a depth of 30 km and a width of 120 km, which was called the "Nikopol Bridgehead".

Both Manstein and Kleist demanded that their forces be allowed to pull back to more defensible positions, however, they were overruled by Hitler who ordered his armies to stand where they were. Despite Hitler's orders, German troops retreated anyway, often in direct disregard of orders or after submitting fictitious reports to justify their actions.

=== Soviet ===
The Stavka committed four Fronts to the operation. In accordance with the general military-political task of completely clearing the German forces from the Ukrainian territories west of the Dnieper and reaching the USSR's state borders, Stavka planned a series of major offensive operations in the southerm sector of the Eastern Front for the winter of 1943/44.The strategic objective was to rout Army Group South, reclaim the agricultural lands of Ukraine and Crimea, and recover vital economic hubs like Krivoy Rog, Kerch, and Nikopol alongside Black Sea ports, creating staging areas for subsequent advances into Poland, the Balkans, and against Army Group Center's flank in Belarus.

The original December 1943 plan tasked the 1st Ukrainian Front with striking from Kiev toward Mogilev-Podolsky to crush the German northern wing,[3] while the 2nd, 3rd, and 4th Fronts executed converging blows to destroy the Nikopol–Krivoi Rog grouping. Operational realities altered this layout in early January 1944: the 1st Ukrainian Front shifted its primary axis toward Vinnitsa and Mogilev-Podolsky, with secondary vectors toward Lutsk and Khristinovka, while the 2nd Ukrainian Front attacked toward Kirovograd and Pervomaisk. These combined thrusts aimed to shatter Army Group South and split its front at the Carpathian Mountains under the overall coordination of Stavka representative Marshal Georgy Zhukov.

Concurrently, the 3rd and 4th Ukrainian Fronts struck toward Nikopol and Novo-Vorontsovka to liquidate the Nikopol–Krivoi Rog grouping before advancing to clear Odessa, Nikolaev, and the Black Sea coast. The 4th Ukrainian Front initially supported this push before switching exclusively to recapture of Crimea alongside the Separate Coastal Army, the Black Sea Fleet, and the Azov Flotilla. The actions of both fronts were coordinated by Stavka representative Marshal Aleksandr Vasilevsky.

The offensive followed a strict sequence. First, clearing the Dnieper and driving the Axis back to the Southern Bug and Ingulets rivers. Then, breaking through to the west and southwest to reach the Lutsk–Mogilev-Podolsky–Dniester line. While partisan sabotage targeted German rear logistics, the Crimean operation was delayed until April due to deteriorating weather and the prerequisite liquidation of the Nikopol–Krivoi Rog pocket. By January 1944, the four fronts aggregated 21 combined-arms armies, 3 tank armies, and 4 air armies—totaling 169 rifle divisions, 9 cavalry divisions, 18 tank and mechanized corps, 31,530 artillery pieces, 1,908 tanks and self-propelled guns, and 2,364 combat aircraft.

== The territory of the right-bank Ukraine ==
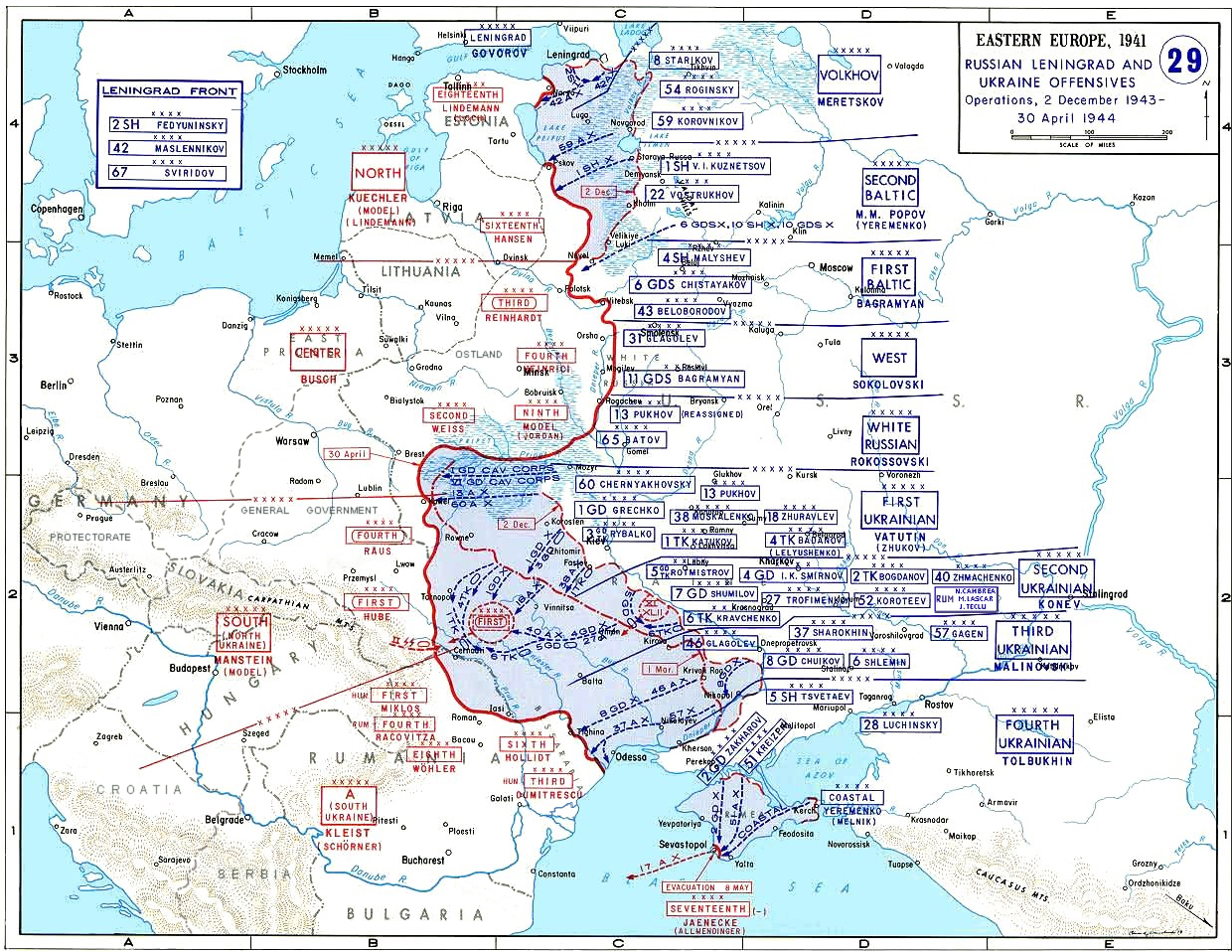
Soviet advances during this operation.

The hostilities that unfolded in January–May 1944 in the southern section of the Soviet-German front covered a vast territory from the Dnieper to the Carpathians, from Polesia to the Black Sea, including the right-bank Ukraine, Western Ukraine, Southern Ukraine, Crimea, part of Moldova and Romania.

The terrain in the combat areas was very diverse, ranging from vast wooded swampy areas, endless steppes, to mountains and hills. On the right-bank Ukraine there are many rivers flowing mainly from the northwest to the southeast: for example, the Dnieper, Southern Bug, Ingulets, Dniester, Prut and Siret. Those rivers were serious natural barriers for the advancing Red Army troops that could be used by the Germans to organize defense. In general, the vast territory of the right-bank Ukraine allowed the Soviets to launch broad offensive operations and use all types of troops, including large armored and mechanized formations.

Right-bank Ukraine makes up more than half of the territory of all Ukraine and is of extreme economic importance. There are many large administrative and industrial centers such as Odessa, Dnepropetrovsk, Krivoy Rog, Nikolaev, Kirovograd, and Vinnitsa. In the areas of the right-bank Ukraine, important industries were developed: iron ore (Krivoy Rog), manganese ore (Nikopol), oil extracting (Drohobych district), shipbuilding (Nikolaev), sugar, textile and other industries. Wheat, sugar beet, maize, rye, and barley are grown on the territory of the right-bank Ukraine. Cattle breeding is well developed in the Polesie regions, while horticulture is well developed in the central and southern regions. Crimea is a horticulture and viticulture district. The iron ore development of the Kerch Peninsula is important. In the Crimea there are 4 large ports: Sevastopol, Feodosiya, Kerch, Yevpatoria.

The capture of the right-bank Ukraine and the Crimea would open the doors for the Red Army troops to Poland, Slovakia, Romania and the Balkans. It would also ensure the domination of the Soviet Black Sea Fleet in the Central and Western parts of the Black Sea.

== Weather and its effect on combat operations ==
One of the defining features of the Dnieper–Carpathian Offensive was the weather, which had a major impact on combat operations.Compared to previous winters on the Eastern Front, the winter of 1943-1944 in Ukraine was unusually warm. During the winter of 1941-1942 around Moscow, the temperatures reached as low –40 °C. Meanwhile, during the winter 1942-1943 Soviet offensives in southern Russia, after the German 6th Army was destroyed at Stalingrad, the temperatures reached at least as low as –20 °C.

In 1944, spring in Ukraine was early. Already in January 1944, melting of the snow began, the wet snow was soon followed by rain. In February, there were frosts and snowstorms in places, but not for long, then it got warmer again by the end of the month. For 10 days in the period from 27 January to 18 February 1944, there were constant rains and wet snowfalls, for 5 days there were no precipitation, while the rest of the days there were snowfalls. Daily mean temperature in Ukraine during this period ranged from –5.5 °C to +4.9 °C. The rivers became flooded, the roads became very muddy, the terrain outside roads became difficult to pass.

Alexander Werth, a British journalist and wartime correspondent, who was with the 2nd Ukrainian Front at the time, described what he saw in Ukraine in the spring of 1944:

The Ukrainian mud in spring has to be seen to be believed. The whole country is swamped, and the roads are like rivers of mud, often two feet deep, with deep holes to add to the difficulty of driving any kind of vehicle, except a Russian T-34 tank. Most of the German tanks could not cope with it.

The flooded rivers became serious obstacles for both sides. For the Germans attempting to break out of Korsun Pocket in February 1944, the last obstacle was the Gniloy Tikich shallow river. Usually, in the hot summer the river was no bigger than a brook that can be easily forded, but in February 1944, after a three-week thaw, the Gniloy Tikich flooded to a width of 20–30 meters. The river was transformed into a fast flowing river, deeper than a person's height. It was a serious obstacle for the encircled German units that had lost their engineering equipment, as there was no bridge or fishing boat on the river. Soon Soviet tanks approached the river and their shots began to pierce gaps in the ranks of the Germans who had gathered on its banks. The banks of the Gniloy Tikich became a grave for thousands of German soldiers. The retreat turned into a disorderly flight. German soldiers threw themselves into the icy water, trying to swim across the river, and many drowned or succumbed to frostbite.

All this sharply reduced the maneuverability of the troops of both sides, especially the Soviet troops that were on continuous advance with supply bases being over 300 km behind. It also limited the use of tanks and artillery, and hampered the supply of rations, fuel and ammunition. In connection with the spring thaw, most of the ground airfields were no longer usable, which complicated the deployment and usage of aviation.However, much to the disappointment of the Germans, the Red Army continued their offensives, becoming the only force in the history of warfare that was able to launch large-scale and successful offensives in the conditions of the spring mud (rasputitsa) and amid flooded rivers.

== Battle ==
=== First phase ===
The initial phase of the offensive, it lasted from 24 December 1943, to 29 February 1944. It included the following operations:

- Zhitomir–Berdichev Offensive (24 December 1943 – 14 January 1944);
- Kirovograd Offensive (5–16 January 1944);
- Korsun–Shevchenkovsky Offensive (24 January 1944 – 17 February 1944);
- Rovno–Lutsk Offensive (27 January 1944 – 11 February 1944);
- Nikopol–Krivoi Rog Offensive (30 January 1944 – 29 February 1944).

==== Zhitomir–Berdichev offensive ====
The offensive was launched on December 24, 1943, by Vatutin's 1st Ukrainian Front, with attacks against the German 4th Panzer Army, to the west and south-west of Kiev. Manstein attempted to counter the attack with a flank attack by the Fourth Panzer Army, while simultaneously requesting reinforcements and permission to shorten the line by withdrawing. Vatutin's offensive continued west, and the Fortieth Army passed south of Fastov. Manstein's attempted counterattack failed when Erhard Raus, the commander of the Fourth Panzer Army, said that he did not have time to organize for an offensive and preferred to attempt to directly stop the attacking troops. On December 27, Manstein directly asked Hitler for permission to pull back his troops, but he was ordered to hold. Soviet troops attacked Kazatin on December 28. After several hours of confused fighting, Soviet forces captured the town later that day. Korosten fell on December 29, and Zhitomir followed on December 31. The Fourth Panzer Army began to fall apart, as a 35-mile gap opened around Zhitomir between its southern flank and the XIII Corps. Another gap developed between the XXXXII Corps and VII Corps. Raus advised Manstein to forgo attempts to close the gaps, and instead focus on keeping the remaining Corps intact. Around the time of the new year, however, Soviet forces began an attempt to encircle German forces, particularly the XIII, XXXXVIII, and XXIV Panzer Corps. As attacks on areas surrounding Berdichev continued, the XIII Corps was reduced to the strength of one infantry regiment. A gap of almost 70 miles was opened between Fourth Panzer Army and the First Panzer Army. Planned German reinforcements were stopped by the Soviet Kirovograd offensive.

In the course of the operation the Soviets achieved notable success. Having advanced to a depth of 80 to 200 km, they almost completely cleared the German forces from the Kiev and Zhytomyr regions, a number of districts of the Vinnitsa and Rovno regions. The Soviets now dangerously threatened Army Group South from the north, while the 27th and 40th Armies had deeply enveloped the German troops that continued to hold the right bank of the Dnieper in the area of Kanev. This created the conditions for the subsequent Korsun-Schevchenkovsky Operation.

The blow of the 1st Ukrainian Front was struck at the most sensitive place of Army Group South – its northern flank, which threatened to cut off its main forces from the paths leading to Germany. The 1st and 4th Panzer Armies operating in the front line had suffered serious losses- the 143rd and 147th Reserve Infantry Divisions were disbanded, the 68th Infantry Division due to heavy losses was withdrawn from the front-line and sent to Poland for extensive refits, while 8th Panzer Division, 20th Panzer-Grenadier Division, 112th, 291st and 340th Infantry Divisions were halved in strength. All told, 8 Wehrmacht divisions were either destroyed or halved in strength.

To close the gaps in their defense and to stop the Soviet offensive on this sector, the Germans had to urgently transfer 12 divisions of the 1st Panzer Army from the southern Ukraine to this area. The reserves turned out to be almost completely spent, which affected the further course of operations. To parry the subsequent attacks of the Soviet troops, the German command was forced to deploy troops from Western Europe, as well as from Romania, Hungary, Yugoslavia.

==== Kirovograd offensive ====
Konev's 2nd Ukrainian Front next joined the fray by launching the Kirovograd offensive on January 5, 1944. One of the first accomplishments was to stop III Panzer Corps' attempted reinforcement of the Fourth Panzer Army, which was simultaneously being attacked by Vatutin's Front in the Zhitomir–Berdichev offensive. At this point, Manstein flew to Hitler's headquarters in East Prussia to ask permission to withdraw, but was again refused.

As a result of the Kirovograd operation, the troops of the 2nd Ukrainian Front pushed back the Germans from the Dnieper 40–50 km. During intense battles, the German 8th Army suffered significant losses- the 167th Infantry Division was disbanded due to heavy losses, while the 10th Panzer-Grenadier Division, 106th, 282nd and 376th infantry divisions suffered 50 to 75% losses in personnel and lost a large number of equipment.

The most important result of the operation was the liberation of Kirovograd – a major stronghold and an important road junction, which broke the stability of the defense of the 8th German Army. The capture of Kirovograd threatened from the south the flanks of German forces which were located around Korsun-Schevchenkovsky. In turn, the Kirovograd Operation, alongside the neighboring Zhitomir-Berdichev Operation, created the conditions for the subsequent Korsun-Schevchenkovsky Operation.

==== Korsun–Shevchenkovsky offensive ====
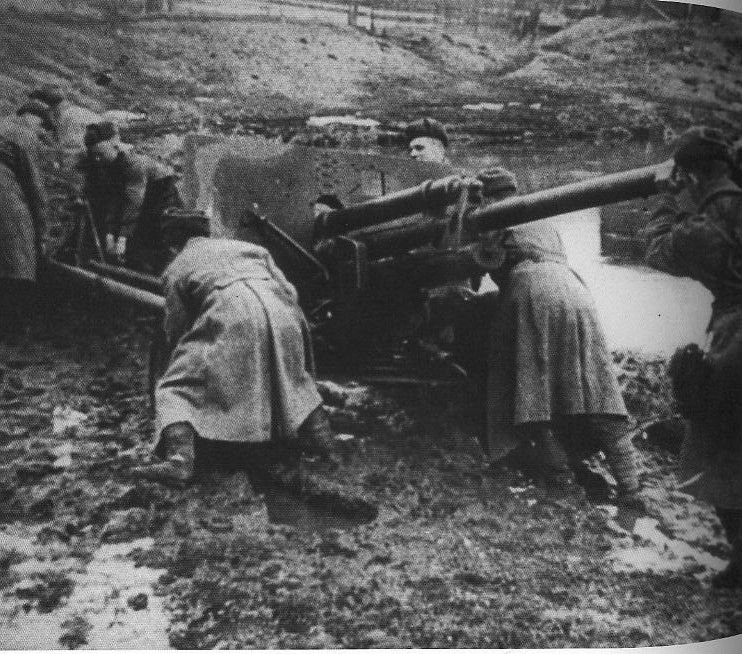
The spring thaw created very muddy conditions which encumbered both armies.

The main effort was to the south, where the Korsun–Shevchenkovsky offensive was launched on January 24. After a massive bombardment, 2nd Ukrainian Front's 4th Guards and 53rd Armies attacked to the south of the Korsun bulge, and were joined the next day by the 5th Guards Tank Army. They broke through and easily repelled a German counter-attack. On January 26, 1st Ukrainian Front dispatched 6th Guards Tank Army from the north, which met up with the forces advancing from the south on January 28, encircling about 60,000 Germans in XI and XXXXII Army Corps around Korsun, in a pocket named "Little Stalingrad" due to the ferocity of the fighting in it. In total, twenty-seven Soviet divisions were assigned to destroy the pocket. Soviet efforts, however, were hindered by the onset of an early thaw, which made the ground muddy.

On February 4 Manstein dispatched Hans Hube, commanding the 1st Panzer Army, including XLVII and III Panzer Corps to assist in a breakout attempt. XLVII Panzer Corps attacked from the south-east, while III Panzer Corps attacked the west, but they were both bogged down by the mud. Zhukov issued a surrender demand to the forces trapped in the pocket on February 8, but was turned down. III Panzer Corps was eventually, after a hard battle of attrition, able to reach Lysyanka, close to the trapped forces, and German forces in the pocket attempted to break out, with a majority perhaps escaping, albeit with heavy losses in abandoned wounded and heavy equipment. Running out of supplies and harried by airstrikes and advancing ground forces, Wilhelm Stemmermann, commander of the trapped forces, decided to attempt a final break-out on the night of February 16–17. The Soviets took approximately 15,000 prisoners, and killed at least 10,000 Germans, including Stemmermann. The battle was waged under incredibly brutal conditions, with Russian POWs shot by the Germans during the retreat, and Konev admitted to allowing his cavalry to massacre troops attempting surrender with upraised hands.

==== Rovno–Lutsk offensive ====
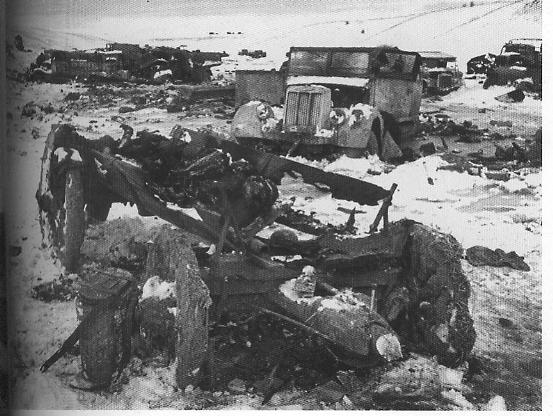
Some of the destroyed German equipment following the attempt to break out from Korsun

Vatutin's forces continued attacking on the right flank, coming near to the important supply centers of Lvov and Ternopol in the Rovno–Lutsk Offensive, which opened a 110-mile gap between Army Group South and Army Group Center, which was stationed to the north.

==== Nikopol–Krivoi Rog offensive ====
The Nikopol–Krivoi Rog offensive was meanwhile launched by 3rd Ukrainian Front to the south against forces in Kleist's Army Group A, and proceeded slowly at first. However, it eventually destroyed the salient projecting around Kryvyi Rih and Nikopol, costing the Germans the important mining operations there as well as nearly encircling the defenders.

While the offensive appeared to slow down in late February, the Soviets were preparing for the second phase of the offensive, soon to be launched on an even larger scale.

=== Second phase ===
These operations were included in the second phase by Soviet planners:

- Proskurov–Chernovtsy offensive (4 March 1944 – 17 April 1944);
- Uman–Botoşani offensive (5 March 1944 – 17 April 1944);
- Bereznegovatoye–Snigirevka offensive (6–18 March 1944);
- Polesskoe offensive (15–5 April 1944);
- Odessa offensive (26 March 1944 – 14 April 1944).

==== Proskurov–Chernovtsy offensive ====
This was the biggest and most important Soviet operation of the Dnieper–Carpathian offensive. Launched on 4 March 1944 by the Soviet 1st Ukrainian Front, the offensive targeted the junction of the German 1st and 4th Panzer Armies. The strategic plan was a deep southern strike to sever the vital Lvov–Odessa railway line supplying Army Group South. The German front soon collapsed, and by 10 March, Soviet spearheads cut the railway between Tarnopol and Proskurov, advancing 60–100 kilometers. Concurrently, the 60th Army reached the outskirts of Tarnopol, which was declared to be a "fortress" (Festung) by Hitler. At that point, the main drive temporarily halted due to the arrival of German reserves and logistical difficulties caused by the spring mud (rasputitsa). Meanwhile, parallel offensives locked down German forces around Brody, Dubno, and Vinnitsa.

Zhukov resumed the offensive on the main axis on 21 March, shattering the German front. The newly introduced Soviet 1st Tank Army advanced south, capturing Chortkov on 23 March and reaching the Dniester on 24 March, while the 4th Tank Army wheeled toward Kamenets–Podolsky. As a result, the 1st Panzer Army lost contact with the 4th Panzer Army, and the 1st Tank Army reached the Dniester on 24 March.Major communication centers fell in rapid succession—Proskurov was cleared on 25 March, Kamenets–Podolsky on 26 March, and Chernovtsy on 29 March—loosely encircling the 1st Panzer Army. The army held a ration strength of 200,000 personnel, but only a small fraction were actual combat troops. This encirclement, however, was incomplete, as understrength Soviet units operating on overextended lines over muddy terrain could not establish a tight ring, especially in the west. Moreover, anticipating a German breakout south across the Dniester into Romania, the Soviet command ordered the 1st Tank Army to the southern bank of the Dniester, excluding it from active combat against the encircled German forces.

1st Panzer Army commander Generaloberst Hans Hube intended to break out south as the Soviets had expected, but was overruled by Generalfeldmarschall Erich von Manstein, who insisted on a westward breakout, utilizing the element of surprise against the weak Soviet forces there. As a relief force attacking from the west, Manstein received the II SS Panzer Corps from France. Supported by a major Luftwaffe airlift, the westward breakout of the 1st Panzer Army began at the end of March. Around the time this westward movement commenced, the escalating strategic crisis prompted Hitler to sack Manstein, replacing him with Generalfeldmarschall Walther Model as commander of Army Group South, which was soon renamed to Army Group North Ukraine. Only at the start of April did the Soviet command realize that the 1st Panzer Army was breaking out westward. In response, parts of the 1st Tank Army were redeployed from southern bank of the Dniester, but this was hampered by the destruction of the river crossings by the Germans. Starting from 4 April, the II SS Panzer Corps, whose arrival was undetected by the Soviets, began launching attacks from the west. By 10 April, contact between the 1st and 4th Panzer Armies was reestablished.

After the breakout, the combat power of the 1st Panzer Army was greatly weakened. All of its divisions were rendered combat-ineffective or suitable only for limited defensive operations. Material losses were extremely high, with divisions and general headquarters combat units having only a small number of heavy weapons, motor vehicles and armoured vehicles afterwards. As a result of continuous combat for several months and severe attrition, the actual combat strength of the 1st Panzer Army divisions, infantry foremost, was reduced to just a fraction of their authorized strength, forcing the German command to assign specialists and personnel from rear services to the frontline Furthermore, the German troops emerged from the pocket physically debilitated from malnutrition and severe lice infestations, with the logistical breakdown triggering a decrease in discipline and the unauthorized seizure of supplies. According to the army’s field post inspection office, the hardships of this campaign had a devastating impact on morale, with four-year veterans describing it as the most difficult experience of the war. On 5 April, the 1st Panzer Army High Command reported the following condition of its divisions:

Due to their material and personnel condition, the following divisions are certainly no longer operational: 1st, 68th, 75th, 82nd, 96th, 254th, 291st Infantry Divisions, 18th Artillery Division, Combat Groups [Kampfgruppen] of the [1st SS Panzer Division] LSSAH, SS-Reich, 11th Panzer Division. The other divisions are also only operational to a very limited extent due to the loss of heavy weapons, artillery, motor vehicles and large parts of their supply facilities, as well as low combat strengths [Gefechtsstärken] and a severe reduction in the overall strength of formations, and are in urgent need of rest and refitting before taking on new decisive tasks. The condition of the divisions will be reported in detail later.

After the breakout and subsequent stabilization of the front, the combat-ineffective 1st SS Panzer Division and the 6th, 11th, 19th, and 25th Panzer Divisions were withdrawn between April and May 1944 and sent to Germany and various parts of occupied Europe for extensive refitting. Furthermore, the worn-out 82nd Infantry Division was disbanded, while the shattered 17th Flak Division was withdrawn to German-occupied Poland for refitting. Just how badly depleted the formations of the 1st Panzer Army were after the breakout is illustrated by the strength report of the LIX Army Corps, which had operated as an attacking force to the west during the encirclement. On 16 April 1944, the corps reported the following personnel and materiel strengths for several of its key divisions.

Strength of the LIX Army Corps units. Status: 16 April 1944.
Division	Ration strength (Verpflegungsstärke)	Combat strength (Gefechtsstärke)	Operational AFVs
1st Panzer Division	7,693	3,389	2 Panthers, 1 StuG, 7 Marder
20th Panzergrenadier Division	5,073	2,866	6 Marder
371st Infantry Division	4,510	2,474	5 Marder

While the 1st Panzer Army fought its way westward to connect with the arriving II SS Panzer Corps, the right-flank forces of the 1st Ukrainian Front focused on the liquidation of the trapped German Tarnopol garrison in the sector of the 4th Panzer Army, which was encircled since 23 March. Lacking heavy anti-tank weaponry, artillery, and vital provisions, the garrison steadily shrank under continuous Soviet attacks. When a last-ditch breakout toward German relief units failed, the Tarnopol garrison was destroyed. Out of the initial strength of 4,600 troops, only 55 successfully reached safety by 18 April. The commander of the garrison, Generalmajor Egon von Neindorff, was killed during the breakout attempt.

On 17 April 1944, due to exhaustion, the arrival of German reinforcements, and the deployment of the recently mobilized Hungarian 1st Army, the Stavka ordered the 1st Ukrainian Front to dig in and transition to the defense. Operating in conditions of rasputitsa, the 1st Ukrainian Front had advanced between 80 and 350 kilometers from March to April 1944, recapturing vast territories and major cities of regional significance: Vinnytsia, Proskurov, Kamenets-Podolsky, Chernovtsy and Tarnopol. By advancing to the foothills of the Carpathian Mountains, the Red Army split the strategic front of Army Group South in two. This split and the loss of vital railways severely disrupted the flow of German logistics, forcing most of subsequent German supply movements to the southern wing to be carried out using the long roundabout route through Romania.

==== Uman–Botoshany offensive ====
On March 5 Koniev launched the Uman–Botoshany offensive, advancing rapidly and soon cutting off the supply line for First Panzer Army by capturing Chortkov on March 23. On March 10, the 2nd Ukrainian Front destroyed two Panzer Corps by capturing them at the fall of Uman.

==== Bereznegovatoye–Snigirevka offensive ====
Malinovsky joined with the Bereznegovatoye–Snigirevka offensive the next day, while Tolbukhin was detached to begin preparations for the Crimean offensive. The 3rd Ukrainian Front was advancing on Odessa and into the Romanian-administered Transnistria. After three days of heavy fighting, his spearheading 8th Guards Army had advanced only 5 miles (8.0 km), but it had broken the crust of Karl-Adolf Hollidt's Sixth Army, and quickly advanced 25 miles (40 km) towards Novyi Buh, nearly encircling the defenders. Despite Hitler's orders forbidding retreat, German forces fell back to the Bug River by March 11. The same day, Hollidt managed to break out from his encirclement – primarily because Malinovsky had divided his forces at Nikolaev – and was able to improvise a defensive line on the Bug by March 21. However, he had lost Hitler's confidence, and was sacked, to be replaced with Maximilian de Angelis. On March 28, pressed hard all over the line, German troops began to fall back from the Bug.

==== Polesskoe offensive ====
The Polesskoye offensive began on 15 March, launched by the 2nd Belorussian Front against the junction of Army Group South and Army Group Center to attack into the rear of Army Group Center. Although initially successful, the Soviet troops were unable to take the festung of Kovel, which they encircled. The German command rushed reinforcements to the area which successfully broke the siege. The Polesskoye offensive was the only one of the offensives within the Dniper–Carpathian offensive that failed to achieve its goals.

==== Odessa offensive ====
Soviet T-34 tanks near Odessa, April 1944

By March 25, the Prut had fallen and the 3rd Ukrainian Front was dispatched to secure Odessa. On April 2, Vasili Chuikov's 8th Guards Army and 46th Army attacked through a blizzard and, by April 6, had driven the defenders past the Dniester River and isolated Odessa. Odessa capitulated on April 10, and Soviet troops began entering Romania proper.

== Aftermath ==
The battles on the right-bank Ukraine and in the Crimean offensive were the most important events of the 1944 winter-spring campaign on the Eastern Front and were of the greatest political, economic and strategic importance.

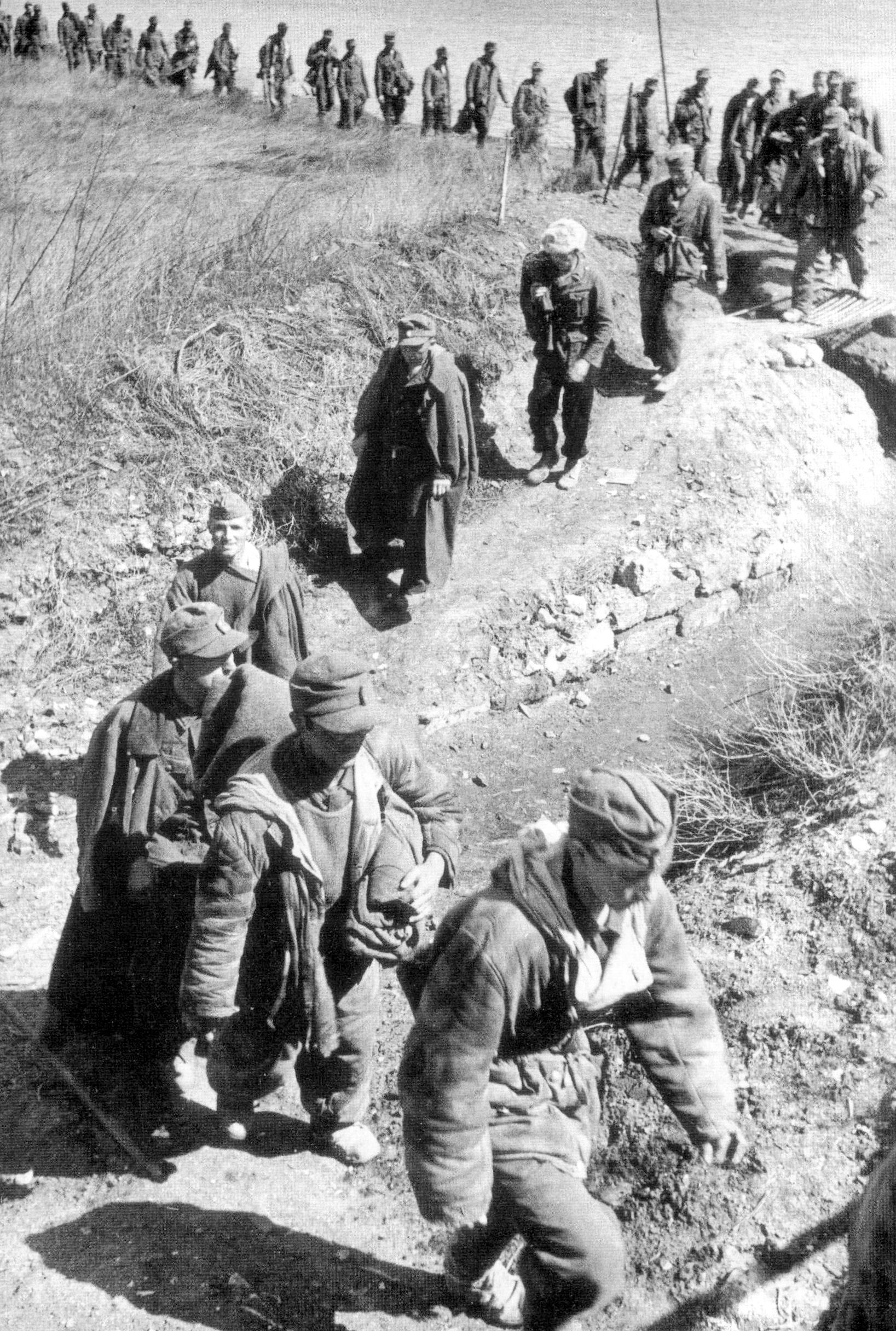
German POWs near Odessa, April 1944

Between late December 1943 and early May 1944, the Red Army troops defeated the strongest German force on the territory of the right-bank, western, and southern Ukraine, which was Army Group South and Army Group A, and forced the battered army groups to retreat 250–450 km to the west, into eastern Poland (Galicia) and Romania.

The defeat of Army Group South and Army Group A, and the clearing of the German forces from the Right-Bank Ukraine and Crimea had radically changed the strategic situation in the south. With the Red Army capturing the Lvov-Odessa railway, the main supply lifeline of Army Group South, and reaching the Carpathian Mountains, the front of Army Group South was split into two parts, north and south of the Carpathians. The northern portion was pushed back into Galicia (Poland), while the southern portion was pushed back into Romania.

The northern portion was renamed to Army Group North Ukraine, while the southern portion to Army Group South Ukraine, which was effective from 5 April 1944, although very little of Ukraine remained in German hands. As a result of this split, the connection between these two new army groups had been broken. Now, the southern group of German forces would have to use the long roundabout route through the Balkans, with all of the supplies being rerouted over the Romanian railroads, which were in poor condition.

For the German forces deployed in Ukraine, the personnel losses were significant. During the campaign, nine infantry and one Luftwaffe field division were destroyed, while seven panzer and panzergrenadier, one parachute, and two infantry divisions were so badly damaged that they were withdrawn from the front and sent to the West for extensive refits. Nearly all the rest of the divisions were heavily damaged as well, suffering at least 50% losses in personnel, while some were left with just remnants of their troops. For instance, 18 of the 39 divisions belonging to Army Group A were categorized as Kampfgruppen, or battle groups, meaning that the divisions were so depleted as to actually be the equivalent of little more than reinforced regiments.

According to Tippelskirch, the defeat of the German forces on the right-bank Ukraine was the biggest since Stalingrad: "Since the time when the German armies followed a thorny path from the Volga and the Caucasus, retreating to the Dnieper, this was their biggest defeat. Even such skilled generals as Manstein and Kleist could not save the German troops."

In Crimea, during the April–May 1944 Crimean offensive, the German 17th Army was annihilated. The five German and seven Romanian divisions that were part of it were largely destroyed.

In reaction to the German defeat, Hitler took repressive measures against the senior command. Manstein and Kleist were dismissed by Hitler and replaced by Model and Schörner, respectively. Many commanders of corps, divisions and commandants of the "fortresses" were removed from their posts and put on trial. Thousands of middle and junior officers were convicted by military courts.

With crushing blows between January and May 1944, the Red Army thwarted the intentions of the German command to wage a protracted defensive war and overturned all attempts by the Germans to create a stable defense on the southern part of the Soviet-German front.

The huge losses of the German troops significantly shook the stability of the German defenses on the entire Soviet-German front, weakening the forces of the neighboring Army Group Center, as well as weakening the German forces stationed in France prior to the opening of the second front in Europe.

The Dnieper–Carpathian offensive had a major impact upon the future course of events during the summer of 1944 in the East and West. In essence, the battle turned out to be a huge bloodsucker that absorbed huge amounts of German resources from across France, Germany, Denmark, Poland, the Balkans and Army Group Center. All told, between January–May 1944, a total of 34 divisions, 550,000 men and 853 tanks, assault guns, and self-propelled anti-tank guns were transferred to Ukraine from across Europe and Army Group Center.

To deal with the crises and to stabilize the front-lines in western Ukraine, the Wehrmacht was forced to redirect huge amounts of men, equipment, and reinforcements to that area. These resources were desperately necessary to prepare the forces in France for the upcoming Allied invasion and whose redirection critically weakened Army Group Center.

This Soviet offensive also ended any prospects the Germans may had about creating a sizable strategic reserve, since most of the German reserves were exhausted in this battle. In turn, this set the Wehrmacht up for a new series of even greater disasters in the summer of 1944. While German defeat was inevitable at this point in the war, the Soviet success during this offensive had sped up the process of the eventual Allied victory and saved the Allies a great deal of time, blood, and treasure.

The Soviet success during this offensive created the conditions for a series of major offensives in the summer of 1944. First, conditions were created to develop attacks in the Lublin direction to the flank and rear of Army Group Center, which were accomplished during the Lublin–Brest offensive. Secondly, conditions were created to develop attack in the Lvov direction and towards eastern Poland, which was accomplished during the Lvov–Sandomierz offensive. Thirdly, conditions were created to develop attack deeper into Romania and the Balkans, which were accomplished during the second Jassy–Kishinev offensive.

The operation, along with the Crimean offensive, resulted in very heavy casualties for the unmotorized Romanian troops stationed in Ukraine. The heavy casualties and the proximity of Soviet forces to the Romanian border were the primary motivations for Romanian leaders when they began secret peace talks in Moscow soon after the completion of the offensive.

In Soviet propaganda, this offensive was listed as one of Stalin's ten blows.

=== Territory recaptured ===
In the course of the operation the Vinnitsa, Volyn, Zhytomir, Kiev, Kirovohrad, Rivne, Khmelnytskyi (Khmelnitskiy) and parts of Poltava Oblasts, and the Moldavian Soviet Socialist Republic were taken by the Red Army.

=== Modern view ===
During the Cold War the operation was not very widely recognized in Western history for the significant strategic victory that it really was. Also, under the influence of German historiography and biographies, Western historians until the end of the Cold War focused on the German successes in the extrication of the 1st Panzer Army instead of the Soviet operations themselves that liberated much of Ukraine.

Postwar Soviet historiography also tended to ignore the operation. Some of the commanders involved were disgraced, and Stalin widely eliminated most references of the operation.

== Sources ==
- Bellamy, Chris (2007). "Destroying the Wehrmacht". Absolute War: Soviet Russia in the Second World War. Alfred A. Knopf. ISBN 978-0-375-41086-4.
- Clark, Alan (1965). ""The Floodgates are Creaking"". Barbarossa: The Russian–German Conflict, 1941–1945. HarperCollins. ISBN 978-0-688-04268-4.
- Erickson, John R. (1983). "The Drive to the Western Frontiers: October 1943 – March 1944". Road to Berlin: Continuing the History of Stalin's War with Germany. Boulder, Colorado: Westview Press. ISBN 0-300-07813-7.
- Glantz, David; House, Jonathan (1998). "Third Winter of the War". When Titans Clashed: How the Red Army Stopped Hitler. Lawrence, Kansas: University Press of Kansas. ISBN 0-7006-0899-0.
- Keegan, John (1989). "Kursk and the Recapture of Western Russia". The Second World War. Harmondsworth, Middlesex: Penguin Books, Ltd. ISBN 0-14-011341-X.
- Liddell Hart, Basil (1970). "The Liberation of Russia". History of the Second World War. New York: G. P. Putnam's Sons. ISBN 0-306-80912-5.
- Pimlott, John; et al. (1989). "Russian Ring of Steel at Korsun". The World at Arms: The Reader's Digest Illustrated History of World War II. London: The Reader's Digest Association Limited. ISBN 0-89577-333-3.
- Werth, Alexander (1964). "Close-Up I: Ukrainian Microcosm". Russia at War, 1941–1945. New York: E. P. Dutton & Co., Inc. ISBN 9788013045928.
- Willmott, H.P. (1989). "Western Ukraine Offensive". The Great Crusade: A New Complete History of the Second World War. New York: The Free Press. ISBN 0-02-934715-7.
- Ziemke, Earl F. (1968). "Offensives on Both Flanks–The South Flank". Stalingrad to Berlin: The German Defeat in the East. Washington, DC: The U.S. Army Center of Military History. ISBN 1-4102-0414-6.
- Frieser, Karl-Heinz; Schmider, Klaus; Schönherr, Klaus; Schreiber, Gerhard; Ungváry, Kristián; Wegner, Bernd (2007). "Die Rückzugsoperationen der Heeresgruppe Süd" [The Retreat of Army Group South]. Die Ostfront 1943/44 – Der Krieg im Osten und an den Nebenfronten [The Eastern Front 1943–1944: The War in the East and on the Neighbouring Fronts] (in German). Vol. VIII. München: Deutsche Verlags-Anstalt. ISBN 978-3-421-06235-2.
- Djilas, Milovan (1962). Conversations with Stalin. Orlando, Florida: Harcourt Brace& Company. ISBN 0-15-622591-3.
