= Per Pedersen Tjøstland =

Norwegian Nazi activist

SS-Rottenführer Per Pedersen (Tjøstland from 1943)
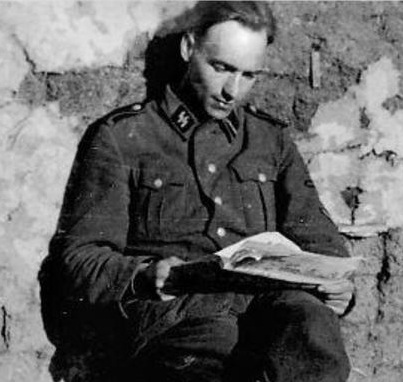
- SS-Rottenführer Per Pedersen Tjøstland on the Eastern Front during the Second World War
- Born: 27 February 1918; Fister, Rogaland, Norway
- Died: 14 December 2004 (aged 86); Stavanger, Norway
- Spouse: Gerd Ingebjørg Essén
- Military career
- Branch: Waffen-SS

Per Asbjørn Pedersen Tjøstland (27 February 1918 – 14 December 2004), né Per Asbjørn Pedersen, was a Norwegian Nazi activist and SS volunteer. As editor of the Norwegian SS newspaper Germaneren, he belonged to the radical and anti-capitalist wing of Nazism, and was a proponent of "a total revolution" and racial war.

== SS volunteer ==
In 1941, he was among the first Norwegians to volunteer for service with the SS, where he held the rank of Rottenführer, and by his own admission took part in massacres of Jews on the Eastern Front.

== Nazi writer and editor in Norway ==
After returning to Norway in 1943, he became deputy editor and then, in 1944, editor of the newspaper Germaneren, the official publication of Germanske SS Norge. Tjøstland belonged to a radical and anti-capitalistic Nazi faction that supported Pan-Germanism. His newspaper was, to the extent permitted by the circumstances, openly critical of the ruling Norwegian fascist party Nasjonal Samling for not being supportive of Pan-Germanism, for not being radical enough, for being unremarkable Nazis, for its perceived corruption and infiltration by people motivated by opportunism rather than conviction, and for being more concerned with Norwegian national interests than Nazism. Tjøstland was a supporter of a "total revolution" and racial war. He chastised "false National Socialists" who "declared themselves to be National Socialists in order to destroy National Socialism." He adopted the name Tjøstland in 1943.

== Prison ==
Tjøstland was arrested in 1945. In 1946, he was sentenced to five years of forced labour for treason, and was released from prison in 1949.

== Family and legacy ==
He had six children and 20 grandchildren. In 2014, his granddaughter Ida Jackson (née Tjøstland Søland) published the book Morfar, Hitler og jeg ("My Grandfather, Hitler, and I"), after discovering by reading the Norwegian Wikipedia article about her grandfather that he was a well-known Nazi activist.
