= Tyshkivka =

Tyshkivka may refer to several places in Ukraine:

- Tyshkivka, a village in Ukraine, located in the Vinnytsia Oblast, Haisyn Raion
- Tyshkivka, a village in Ukraine, located in the Kirovohrad Oblast, Novoukrainka Raion, Novomyrhorod urban territorial hromada (formerly Novomyrhorod Raion)
- Tyshkivka, a village in Ukraine, located in Kirovohrad Oblast, Novoukrainka Raion, Tyshkivka rural territorial hromada (formerly Dobrovelychkivka Raion)
- Tyshkivka, a village in Ukraine, located in Luhansk Oblast, Starobilsk Raion
- Tyshkivka, a village in Ukraine, located in Chernihiv Oblast, Pryluky Raion
