= Tsukrovariv =

Former settlement in Ukraine

Tsukrovariv (Ukrainian: Цукроварів) is a former settlement and part of the selo of Lypniazhka in Novoukrainka Raion of Kirovohrad Oblast. It belongs to Dobrovelychkivka settlement hromada, one of the hromadas of Ukraine. The town, located close to the urban-type settlement of Dobrovelychkivka, was established for the workers of a giant sugar refinery that was once on the site (tsukrovar means sugar plant in Ukrainian). Nowadays the place is abandoned and mostly a ghost town, keeping just some tens of residents.

Until 18 July 2020, Tsukrovariv and Lypniazhka belonged to Dobrovelychkivka Raion. The raion was abolished in July 2020 as part of the administrative reform of Ukraine, which reduced the number of raions of Kirovohrad Oblast to four. The area of Dobrovelychkivka Raion was merged into Novoukrainka Raion.
