= Andriivka, Tyshkivka rural hromada =

Andriivka Андріївка
- Village
- Location within Ukraine Kirovohrad Oblast Location within Ukraine
- Coordinates: 48°25′36″N 30°58′09″E
- Country: Ukraine
- Oblast: Kirovohrad Oblast
- Raion: Novoukrainka Raion
- Hromada: Tyshkivka rural hromada
- Established: 1870

Area
  - Total: 139 km^{2} (54 sq mi)

Population (2001)
  - Total: 313
  - Density: 2.25/km^{2} (5.83/sq mi)
- Time zone: UTC+2 (EET)
  - Summer (DST): UTC+3 (EEST)

Andriivka is a village in Ukraine, which belongs to the Tyshkivka rural territorial hromada in Novoukrainka Raion, Kirovohrad Oblast. Until 2020, it was part of the Dobrovelychkivka Raion, Kirovohrad Oblast.

== Population ==
According to the 1989 census of the Ukrainian SSR, the village's population was 354 people, of whom 144 were men and 210 were women. According to the 2001 Ukrainian census, the village had a population of 313 people.
