= Fedorivka, Novoukrainka Raion, Kirovohrad Oblast =

Rural locality in Kirovohrad Oblast, Ukraine

Coordinates: 48°25′50″N 30°50′40″E

Fedorivka is a selo in Novoukrainka Raion, Kirovohrad Oblast of Ukraine. Fedorivka belongs to Tyshkivka rural hromada, one of the hromadas of Ukraine. The village is best known as the site of an ancient mega-settlement dating to 4100 BC belonging to the Cucuteni–Trypillia culture. The settlement was very large for that time, covering an area of 50–100 hectares (120–250 acres) and an estimated population of 6,700.

Until 18 July 2020, Fedorivka belonged to Dobrovelychkivka Raion. The raion was abolished in July 2020 as part of the administrative reform of Ukraine, which reduced the number of raions of Kirovohrad Oblast to four. The area of Dobrovelychkivka Raion was merged into Novoukrainka Raion.
