= Novomyrhorod urban territorial hromada =

Urban hromada of Kirovohrad Oblast, Ukraine

Novomyrhorod urban territorial hromada Новомиргородська міська територіальна громада
- Hromada
- Location within Ukraine Kirovohrad Oblast Location within Ukraine
- Coordinates: 48°47′00″N 31°39′00″E
- Country: Ukraine
- Oblast (province): Kirovohrad Oblast
- Raion (district): Novoukrainka Raion
- Founded: June 12, 2020

Area
  - Total: 998.5 km^{2} (385.5 sq mi)

Population (2020)
  - Total: 27,170
- Website: https://rada-novomirgorod.gov.ua

Novomyrhorod urban territorial hromada (Ukrainian: Новомиргородська міська територіальна громада, romanized: Novomyrhorod urban territorial hromada) is an urban territorial hromada in Novoukrainka Raion, Kirovohrad Oblast, Ukraine. The administrative center is the city of Novomyrhorod. The area of the hromada is 998.5 km^{2}, and the population is 27,170 inhabitants (2020).

The hromada includes 1 city (Novomyrhorod), 1 rural settlement (Kapitanivka) and 45 villages.
