= Furmanivka =

Furmanivka (Ukrainian: Фурманівка) may refer to the following places in Ukraine:

- Furmanivka, village in Kamianets-Podilskyi Raion, Khmelnytskyi Oblast
- Furmanivka, village in Novoukrainka Raion, Kirovohrad Oblast
- Furmanivka, village in Kiliya Raion, Odesa Oblast
