= Mala Vyska Raion =

Former subdivision of Kirovohrad Oblast, Ukraine

Mala Vyska Raion Маловисківський район
- Raion
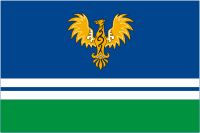
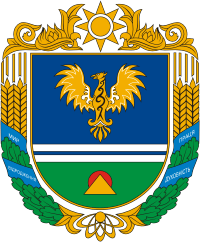
- Flag Coat of arms

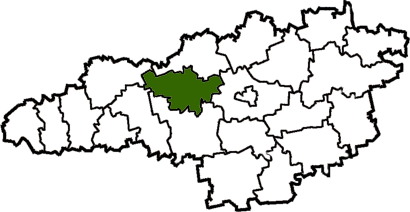
- Coordinates: 48°31′43″N 32°25′22″E
- Country: Ukraine
- Region: Kirovohrad Oblast
- Established: 1923
- Disestablished: 18 July 2020
- Admin. center: Mala Vyska
- Subdivisions: List: 1 — city councils; 1 — settlement councils; 18 — rural councils; Number of localities: 1 — cities; 1 — urban-type settlements; 54 — villages; — rural settlements

Government
  - Governor: Viktor Reznik

Area
  - Total: 1,111 km^{2} (429 sq mi)

Population (2020)
  - Total: 41,251 ▼
  - Density: 37.13/km^{2} (96.17/sq mi)
- Time zone: UTC+02:00 (EET)
  - Summer (DST): UTC+03:00 (EEST)
- Postal index: 26200—26245
- Area code: +380 5258
- Website: http://mvrada.org.ua

Mala Vyska Raion (Ukrainian: Маловисківський район) was a raion (district) of Kirovohrad Oblast in central Ukraine. The city of Mala Vyska was the administrative center of the raion. The raion was abolished on 18 July 2020 as part of the administrative reform of Ukraine, which reduced the number of raions of Kirovohrad Oblast to four. The area of Mala Vyska Raion was merged into Novoukrainka Raion. The last estimate of the raion population was 41,251 (2020 est.).

The raion was mostly agricultural with some industries located around the regional center. Major products included sugar beets and sugar, milk and some cereal products. Mala Vyska was also the location for the regional boarding school and the regional administration. Outside of Mala Vyska, the raion was composed of several small towns and villages.

At the time of disestablishment, the raion consisted of four hromadas:

- Mala Vyska urban hromada with the administration in Mala Vyska;
- Marianivka rural hromada with the administration in the selo of Marianivka;
- Smoline settlement hromada with the administration in the urban-type settlement of Smoline;
- Zlynka rural hromada with the administration in the selo of Zlynka.
