= Pomichna =

City in Kirovohrad Oblast, Ukraine

Pomichna Помічна
- City
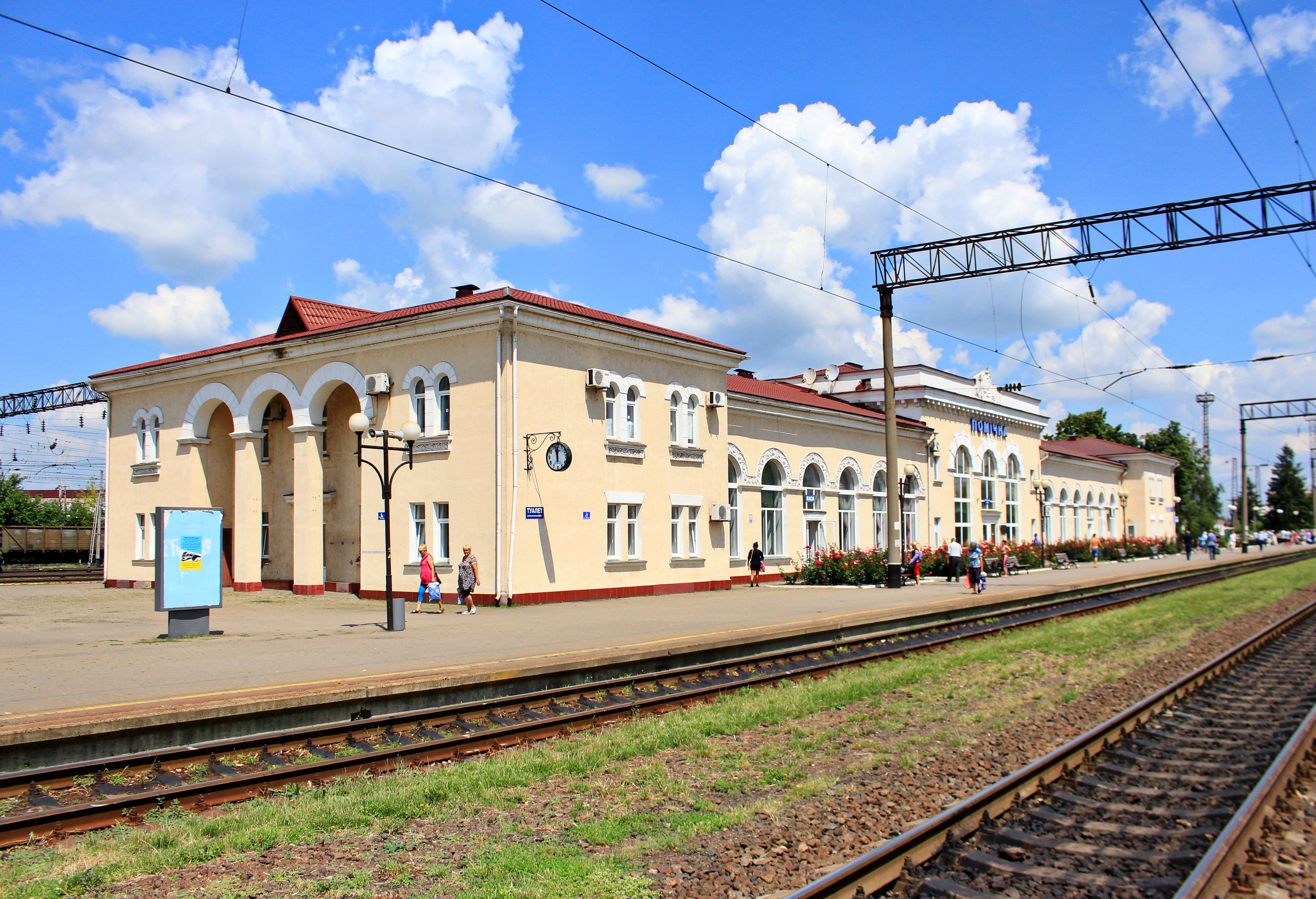
- Pomichna railway station

- Flag Coat of arms
- Interactive map of Pomichna
- Location within Ukraine Location within Ukraine Kirovohrad Oblast
- Coordinates: 48.25°N 31.42°E
- Country: Ukraine
- Oblast: Kirovohrad Oblast
- Raion: Novoukrainka Raion
- Hromada: Pomichna urban hromada

Population (2022)
  - Total: 8,608
  - Estimate (2024): ▲9,534

Pomichna (Ukrainian: Помічна, IPA: [pomitʃˈnɑ]) is a city in Novoukrainka Raion, Kirovohrad Oblast, Ukraine. It hosts the administration of Pomichna urban hromada, one of the hromadas of Ukraine. Population: 8,608 (2022 estimate).

== History ==
In 1775, after the liquidation of Zaporozhian Sich, the Cossacks, leaving the Cossack winter quarters, settled in the slobodas, turning into peasants.

One of these slobodas was located in the modern city of Pomichna. The fortress of St. Elizabeth (in modern-day Kropyvnytskyi) was garrisoned by Zaporozhian Cossacks, and the village of Pomichna provided the garrison with food, thereby providing help (поміч, pomich), hence the name of the settlement "Pomichna".

Pomichna was formerly in the Kherson Governorate of the Russian Empire.

During World War II, the settlement was occupied by German troops. On March 18, 1944, Pomichna was liberated from the Nazi occupiers by the troops of the 2nd Ukrainian Front.

On May 14, 1967, by the Decree of the Presidium of the Supreme Soviet of the Ukrainian SSR, Pomichna received the status of a city.

In 1989, population was 12,322 people.

In 2013, population was 9,210 people.

Until 18 July 2020, Pomichna belonged to Dobrovelychkivka Raion. The raion was abolished in July 2020, as part of the administrative reform of Ukraine, which reduced the number of raions of Kirovohrad Oblast to four. The area of Dobrovelychkivka Raion was merged into Novoukrainka Raion.

== Geography ==
=== Climate ===
Climate data for Pomichna (1981–2010)
Month	Jan	Feb	Mar	Apr	May	Jun	Jul	Aug	Sep	Oct	Nov	Dec	Year
Mean daily maximum °C (°F)	−1.1 (30.0)	−0.1 (31.8)	6.0 (42.8)	14.8 (58.6)	21.4 (70.5)	24.5 (76.1)	26.8 (80.2)	26.5 (79.7)	20.4 (68.7)	13.6 (56.5)	5.4 (41.7)	0.3 (32.5)	13.2 (55.8)
Daily mean °C (°F)	−3.8 (25.2)	−3.2 (26.2)	1.6 (34.9)	9.2 (48.6)	15.4 (59.7)	18.7 (65.7)	20.9 (69.6)	20.3 (68.5)	14.8 (58.6)	8.7 (47.7)	2.1 (35.8)	−2.3 (27.9)	8.5 (47.3)
Mean daily minimum °C (°F)	−6.4 (20.5)	−6.2 (20.8)	−1.9 (28.6)	4.2 (39.6)	9.7 (49.5)	13.4 (56.1)	15.2 (59.4)	14.6 (58.3)	9.8 (49.6)	4.7 (40.5)	−0.6 (30.9)	−4.8 (23.4)	4.3 (39.7)
Average precipitation mm (inches)	29.7 (1.17)	29.5 (1.16)	31.5 (1.24)	34.4 (1.35)	49.6 (1.95)	80.5 (3.17)	63.9 (2.52)	61.5 (2.42)	54.8 (2.16)	38.6 (1.52)	37.4 (1.47)	34.5 (1.36)	545.9 (21.49)
Average precipitation days (≥ 1.0 mm)	7.1	6.5	6.6	6.2	7.5	9.2	6.6	5.9	6.1	5.1	6.3	6.8	79.9
Average relative humidity (%)	86.8	84.1	78.2	66.4	62.9	68.5	66.9	64.7	72.0	78.4	86.9	88.7	75.4
Source: World Meteorological Organization

== Gallery ==
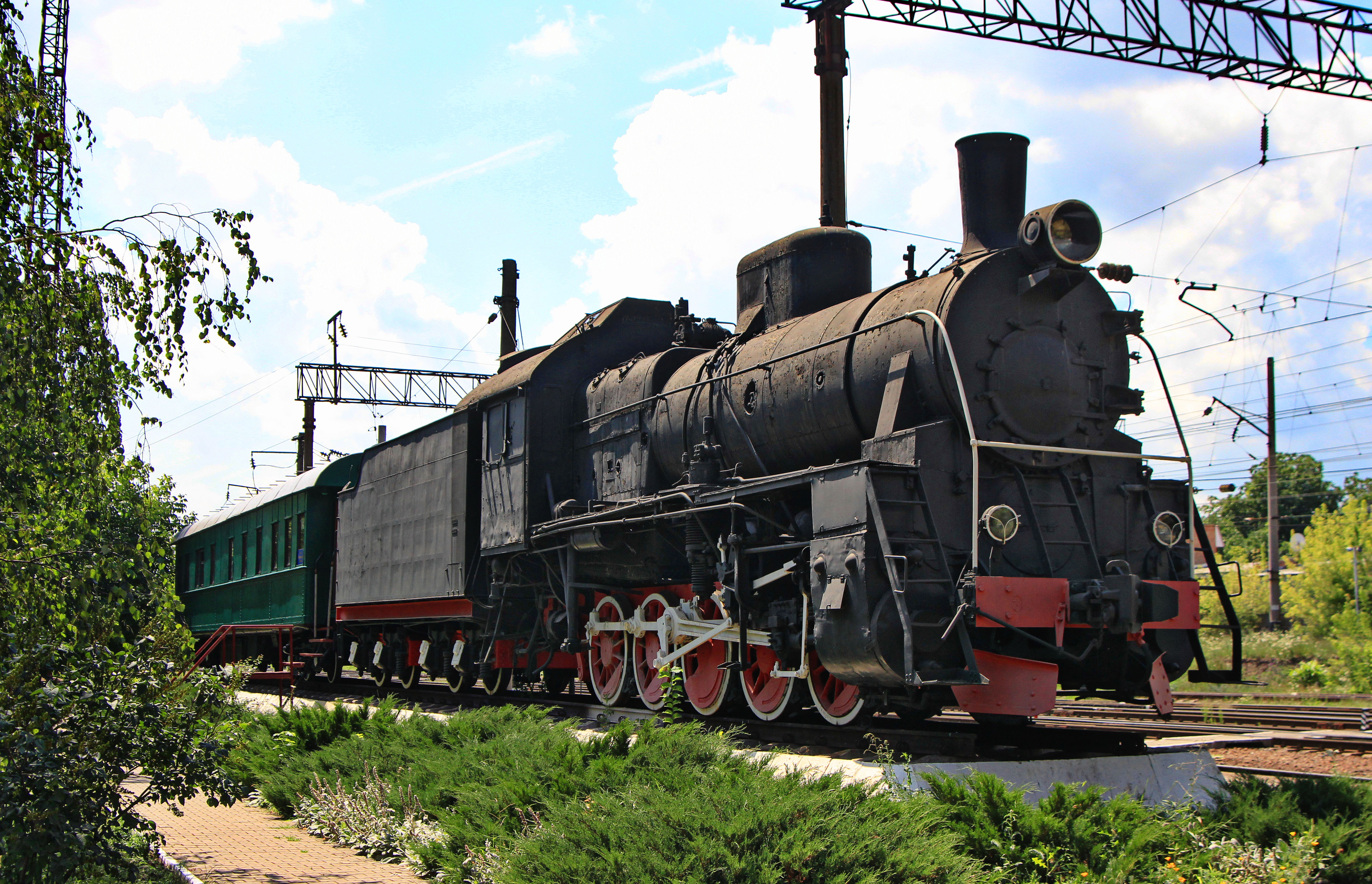
Locomotive-museum

Old water tower

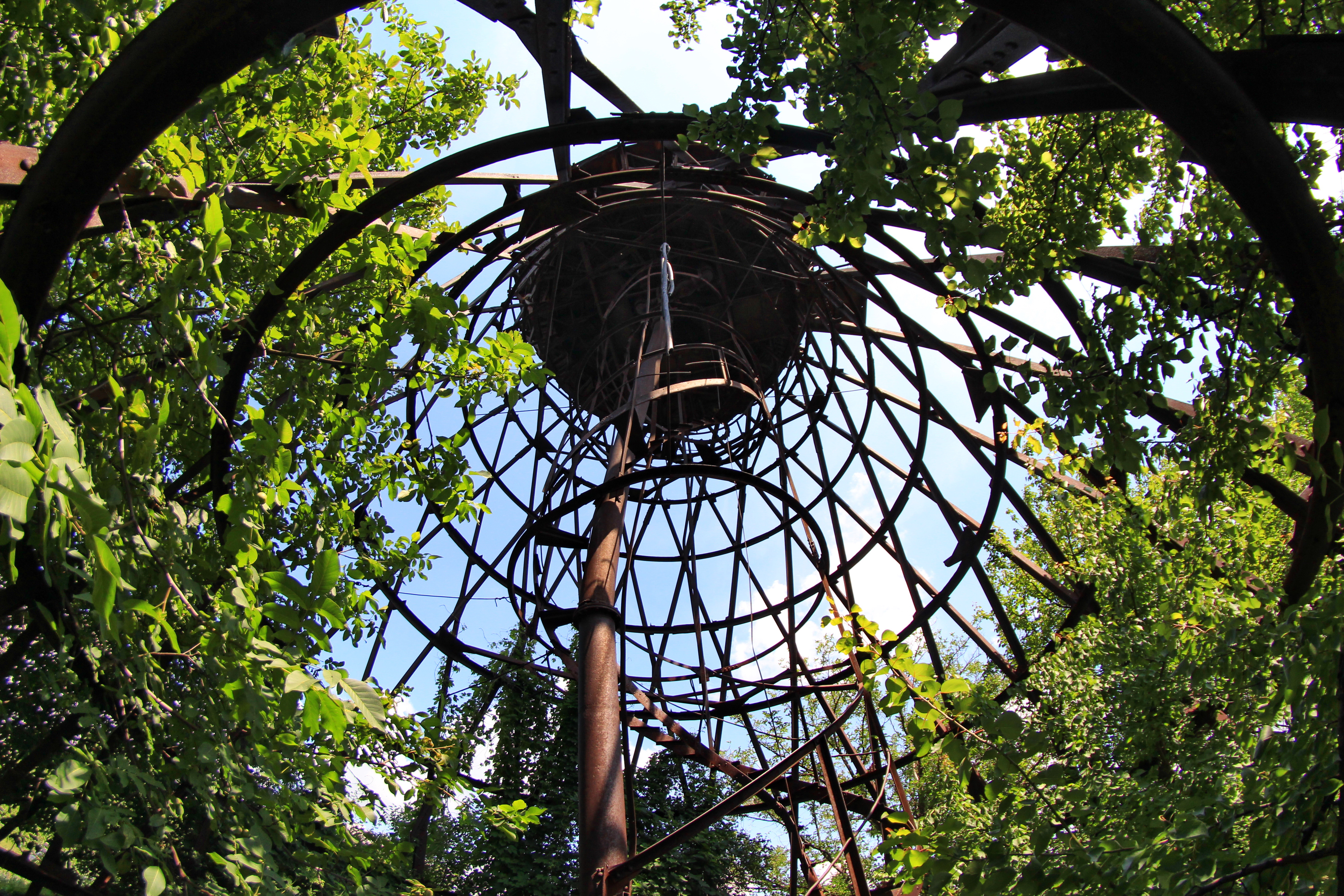
Interior of the old water tower
