= Furmanivka, Kirovohrad Oblast =

Rural locality in Kirovohrad Oblast, Ukraine

Furmanivka Фурманівка
- Location in Ukraine Furmanivka (Ukraine)
- Coordinates: 48°21′46″N 31°21′48″E
- Country: Ukraine
- Oblast: Kirovohrad Oblast
- Raion: Novoukrainka Raion
- Elevation: 166 m (545 ft)

Population (2001)
  - Total: 604
- Time zone: UTC+2 (EET)
  - Summer (DST): UTC+3 (EEST)
- Postal code: 27122
- Area code: +380 5251

Furmanivka (Ukrainian: Фурма́нівка) is a village in Novoukrainka Raion, Kirovohrad Oblast, Ukraine. It forms part of Novoukrainka urban hromada, one of the hromadas of Ukraine.

== Demographics ==
According to the 1989 Soviet census, the population of Furmanivka was 625 people, of whom 271 were men and 354 women.

According to the 2001 Ukrainian census, 604 people lived in the village.

=== Languages ===
According to the 2001 census, the primary languages of the inhabitants of Furmanivka were:

Language	Percentage
Ukrainian	91.39 %
Moldovan (Romanian)	4.47 %
Armenian	1.66 %
Russian	1.16 %
Belarusian	0.50 %
Bulgarian	0.50 %
Romanian (self-declared)	0.17 %
