= Smoline =

Rural locality in Kirovohrad Oblast, Ukraine

Smoline Смоліне
- Rural settlement
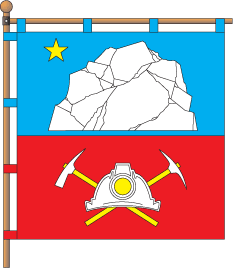
- Flag Coat of arms

- Location in Ukraine Smoline (Ukraine)
- Coordinates: 48°36′6″N 31°17′41″E
- Country: Ukraine
- Oblast: Kirovohrad Oblast
- Raion: Novoukrainka Raion
- Hromada: Smoline settlement hromada

Population (2022)
  - Total: 9,243
- Time zone: UTC+2 (EET)
  - Summer (DST): UTC+3 (EEST)

Smoline (Ukrainian: Смоліне) is a rural settlement located in Novoukrainka Raion, Kirovohrad Oblast, Ukraine. It hosts the administration of Smoline settlement hromada, one of the hromadas of Ukraine. Population: 9,243 (2022 estimate).

== History ==
Until 18 July 2020, Smoline belonged to Mala Vyska Raion. The raion was abolished in July 2020 as part of the administrative reform of Ukraine, which reduced the number of raions of Kirovohrad Oblast to four. The area of Mala Vyska Raion was merged into Novoukrainka Raion.

Until 26 January 2024, Smoline was designated urban-type settlement. On this day, a new law entered into force which abolished this status, and Smoline became a rural settlement.

== Population ==
Population growth
1979	1989	1992	2001	2014
4,995	9,976	10,200	9,454	9,841

Sources: 1979–1989; 2001–2014
