= Novoukrainka =

City in Kirovohrad Oblast, Ukraine

Novoukrainka Новоукраїнка
- City
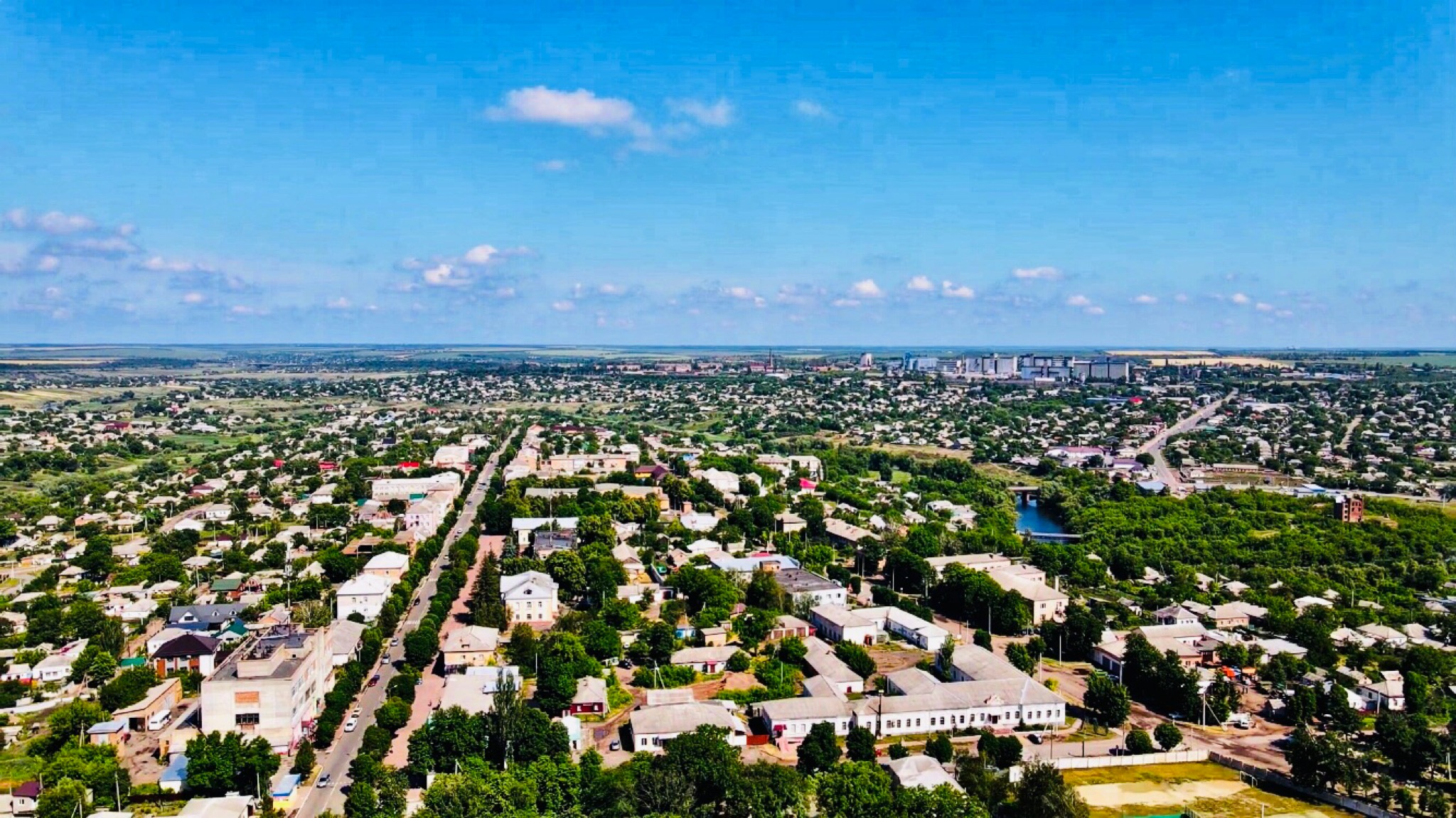
- Skyline of Novoukrainka

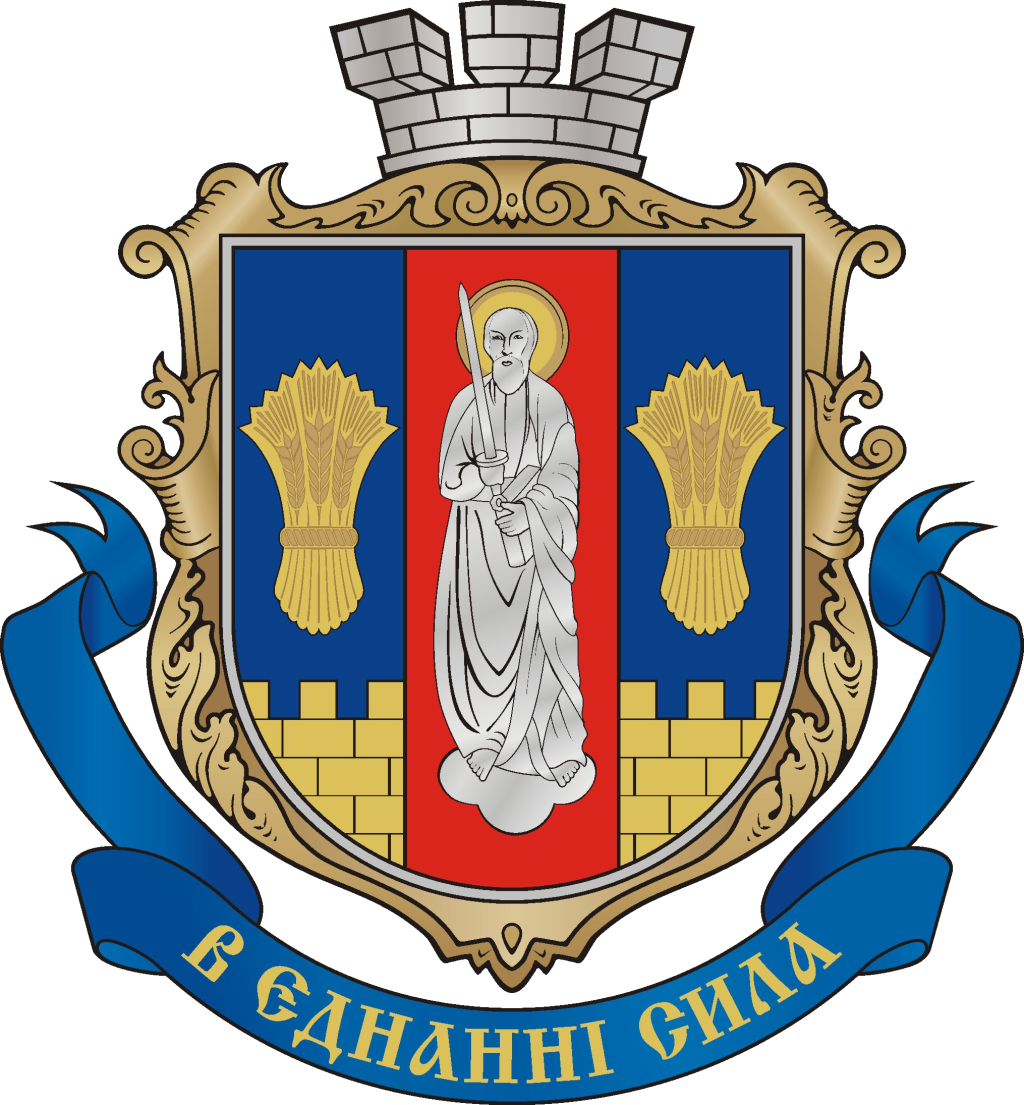
- Flag Coat of arms
- Interactive map of Novoukrainka
- Location in Ukraine Novoukrainka (Ukraine Kirovohrad Oblast)
- Coordinates: 48°19′23″N 31°31′27″E
- Country: Ukraine
- Oblast: Kirovohrad Oblast
- Raion: Novoukrainka Raion
- Hromada: Novoukrainka urban hromada

Population (2022)
  - Total: 16,080
- Postal code: 27100

Novoukrainka (Ukrainian: Новоукраїнка, IPA: [ˌnɔwoʊkrɐˈjinkɐ]; lit. 'New Ukraine') is a city in Kirovohrad Oblast, Ukraine. It serves as the administrative center of Novoukrainka Raion. It hosts the administration of Novoukrainka urban hromada, one of the hromadas of Ukraine. Population: 16,080 (2022 estimate).

== History ==
The territory of the modern city was part of the western part of the possessions of Zaporozhian Sich and belonged to the Buh Hard Palanka (a palanka being an administrative unit of the Sich). Actually, it was part of Dyke Pole (Wild Fields) for many centuries, even before the Hetmanate.

After the beginning of the Russo-Turkish War (1768–1774), according to the project of the commander of the 2nd Russian army, Count Pyotr Panin, the st. Pauls Fort was laid with the placement of the first company and headquarters of the Moldavian hussar regiment of the settlement, formed by Captain Zverev from Moldova.

The same fortification was built on the right bank of the Chorny Tashlyk River. Two fortifications, each with ten guns on the shafts, formed a serious defensive unit. Settlements of the same name were built around them, which became the core of the modern city of Novoukrainka. In June 1774, academician Johann Güldenstedt, while traveling in the Elizavetgrad governorship, noted: "Until 1769, this place was deserted, in the same year a settlement was founded, which today is the administrative center of the Moldavian regiment.".

After the establishment of military settlements in the south of Ukraine, Novopavlivsk (St. Paul's Fort) was transferred to the 3rd Ukrainian Lancer Division in 1821 and the headquarters of the 1st Ukrainian Lancer Regiment was located here, so in 1832 this settlement was renamed Novoukrainka.

In 1857, 6,346 people lived here.

A local newspaper is published here since March 1930.

The exact number of people killed during the Holodomor of 1932–1933 is unknown, but witnesses estimated that the losses during the Second World War were half that of the Holodomor in Novoukrainka.

City since 1938.

From August 2, 1941 to March 17, 1944, it was occupied by the Nazis.

In 1974, 21,000 residents lived here.

In 1989 population was 20 675 people.

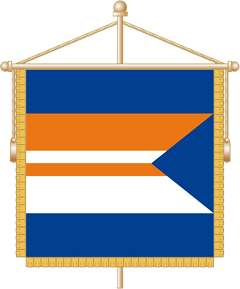
Mayor's banner of Novoukrainka

In 2011, the city adopted new symbols.

== Gallery ==
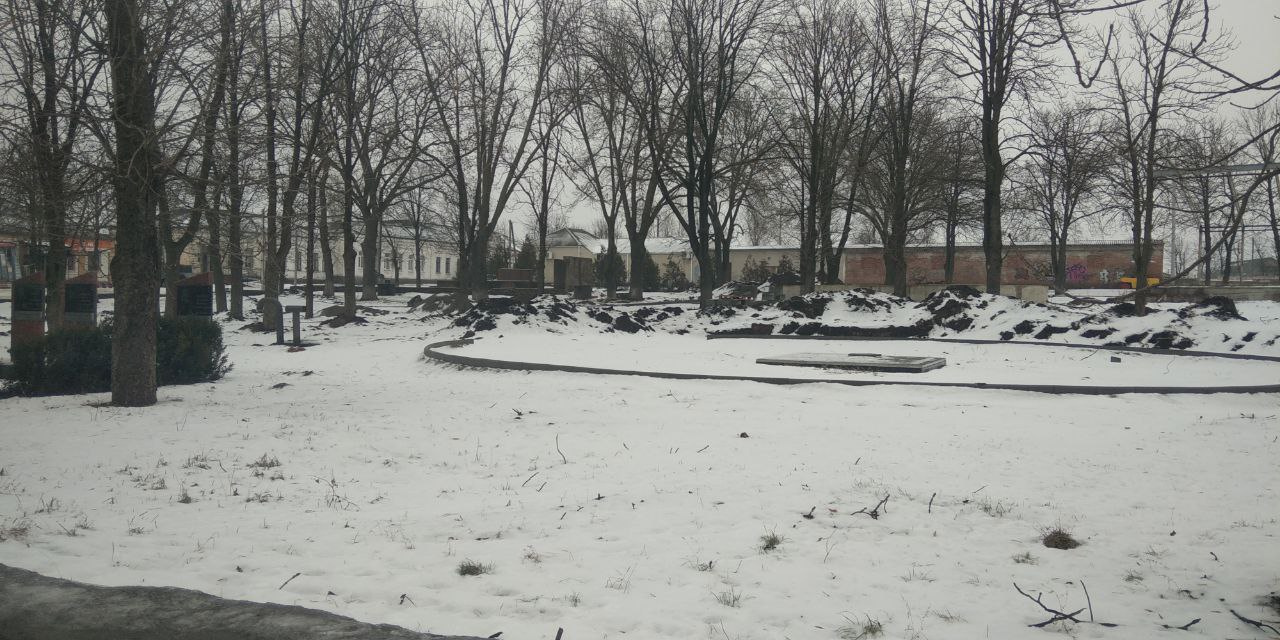
City park

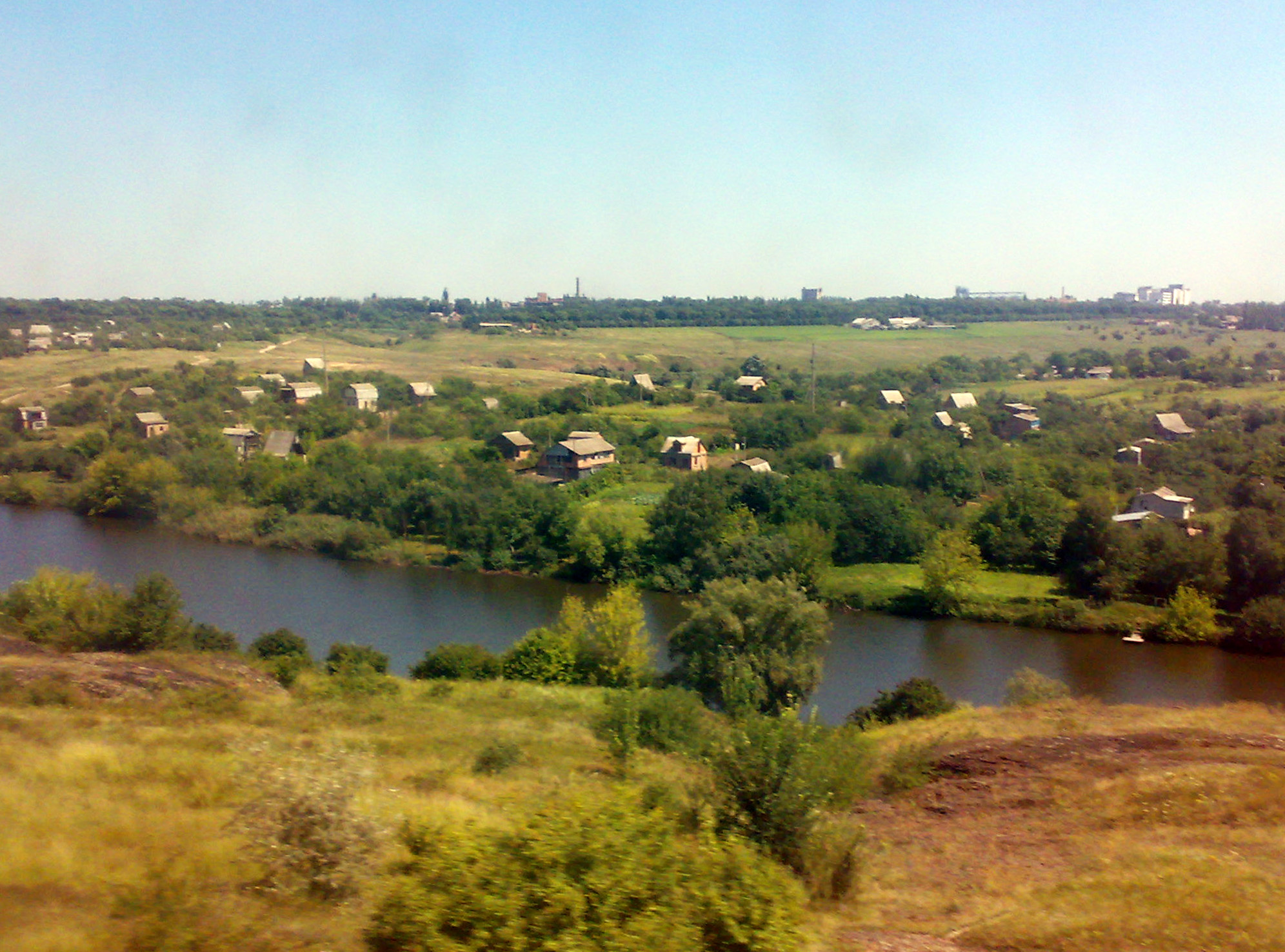
Landscape

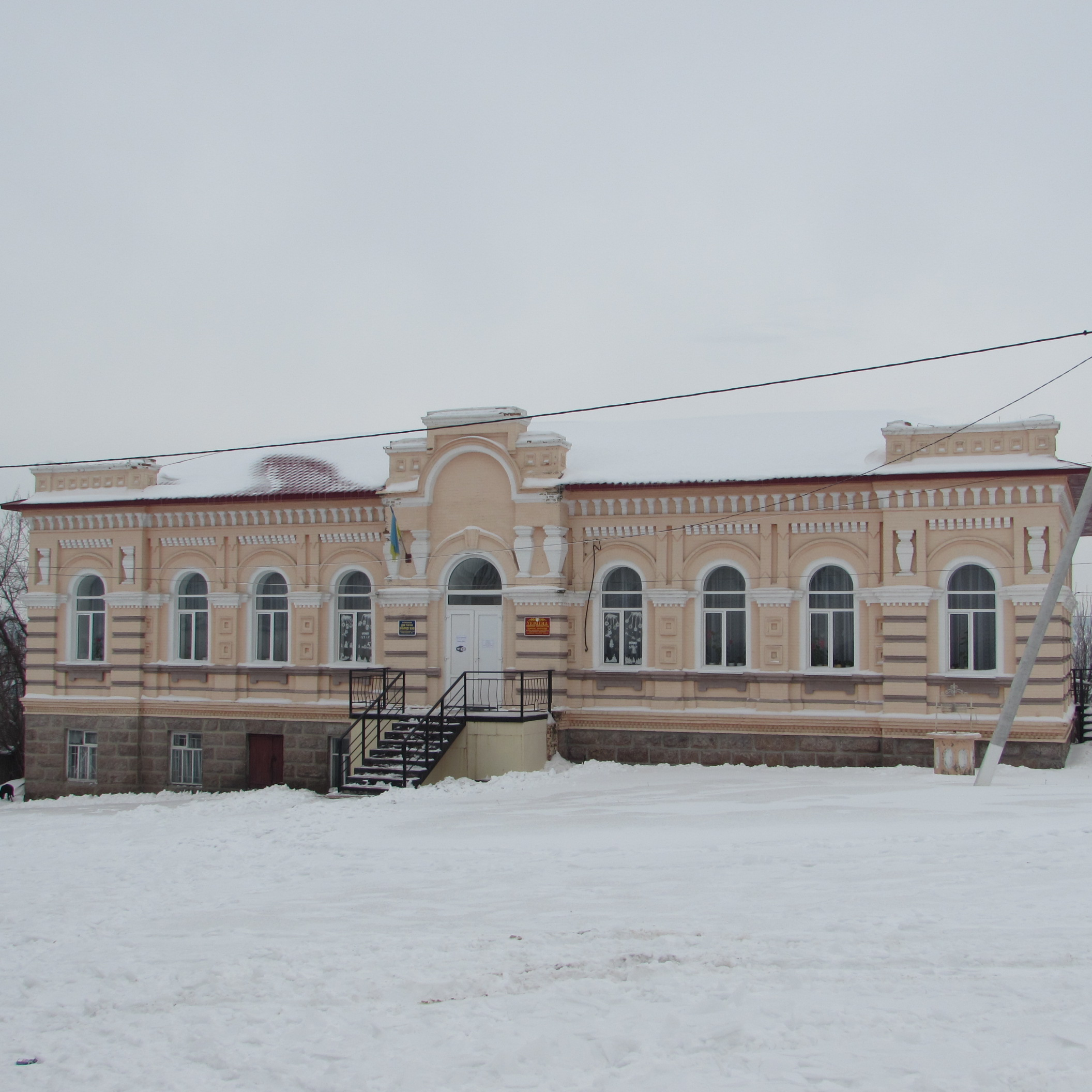
Building of the volost administration

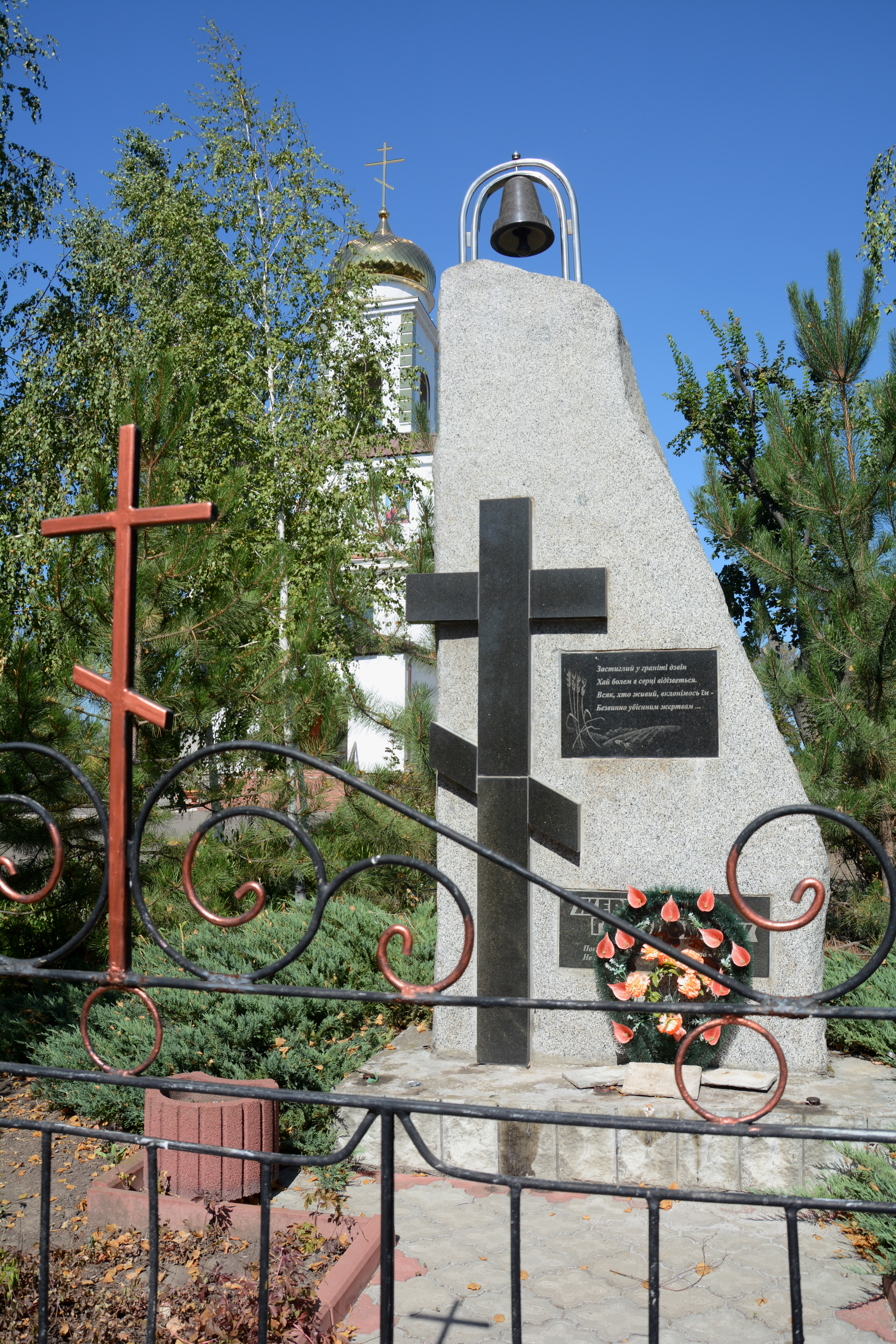
Monument to the victims of the Holodomor

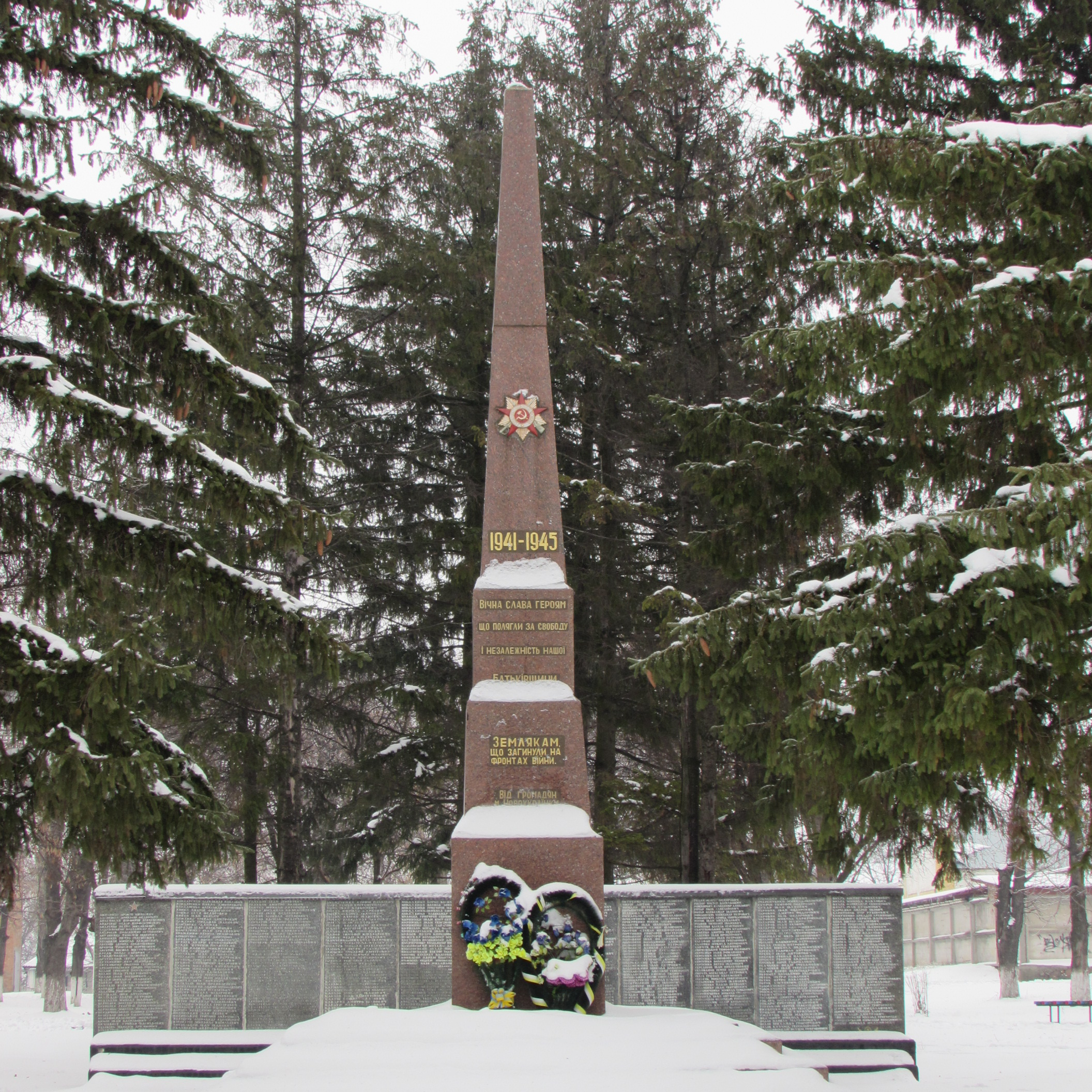
Obelish of the Glory
