= Mala Vyska =

City in Kirovohrad Oblast, Ukraine

Mala Vyska Мала Виска
- City
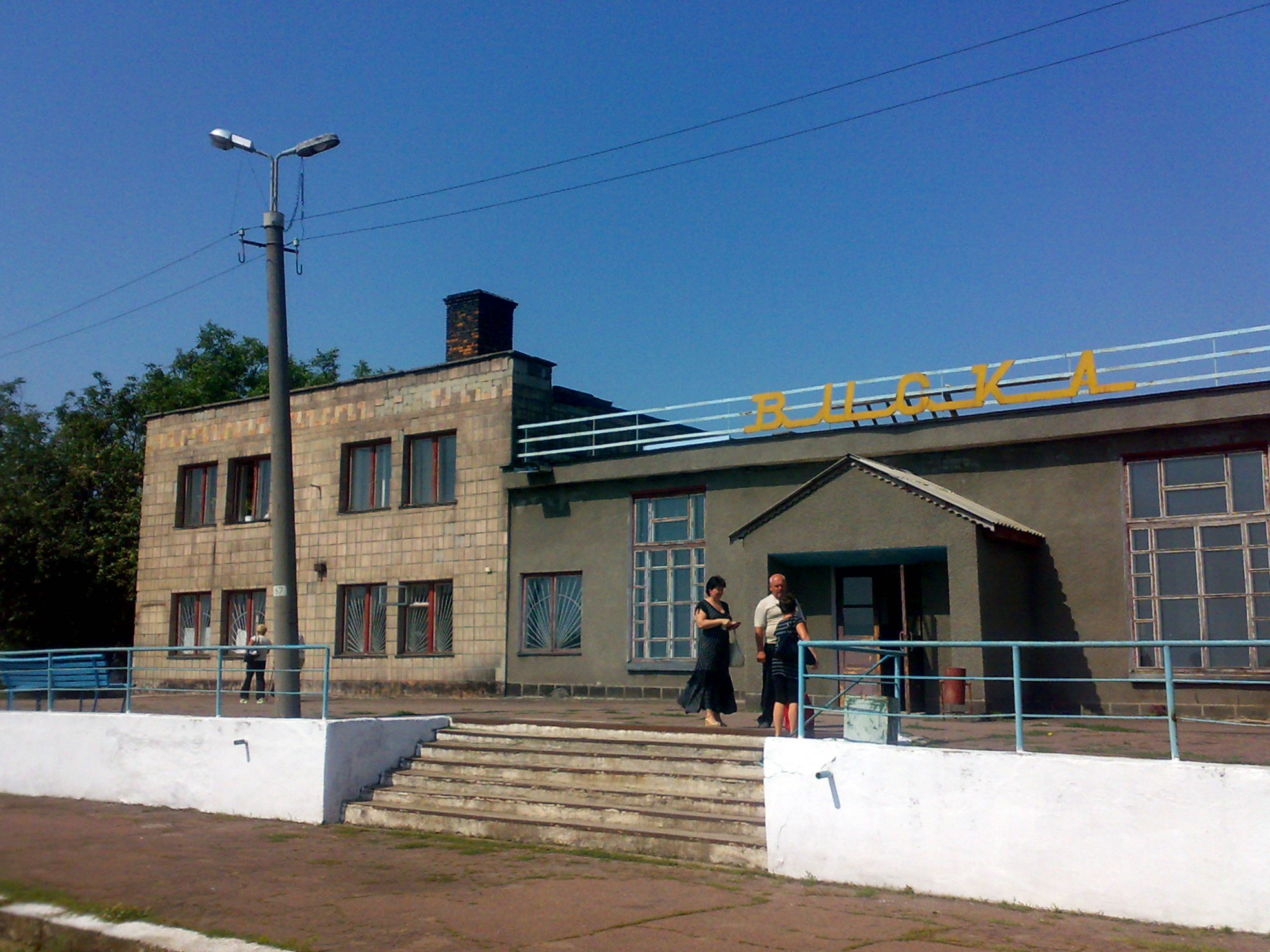
- Mala Vyska railway station

- Flag Coat of arms
- Interactive map of Mala Vyska
- Location within Ukraine Location within Ukraine Kirovohrad Oblast
- Coordinates: 48°39′N 31°38′E
- Country: Ukraine
- Oblast: Kirovohrad Oblast
- Raion: Novoukrainka Raion
- Hromada: Mala Vyska urban hromada
- Founded: 1752

Population (2001)
  - Total: 13,132
- Postal code: 26200

Mala Vyska (Ukrainian: Мала Виска, IPA: [mɐˈlɑ ˈwɪskɐ]) is a city in Novoukrainka Raion, Kirovohrad Oblast (region) of Ukraine. It hosts the administration of Mala Vyska urban hromada, one of the hromadas of Ukraine. As of 2022, the population is 9,960 (2022 estimate), down from 13,132 in 2001.

The city is situated on the river Vys (Вись).

== History ==
According to some sources, on most of the territory of a modern town known as Mala Vyska, Nykodymiv Khutir was located (those times Ukrainian kozaks' slobodas were there).

Despite the fact that a lot of tribes, including Scythian, went through the territory of Mala Vyska, no one lived there permanently. Officially, the history of Mala Vyska dated back to the year 1752, when the first Moldovan emigrants arrived and founded a village at the bench of the river Vysi. Nowadays, that settlement is one of the town's districts called Bessarabia.

In the early 19th century, some of the lands were given as a gift to prince Kudashev by Katherine II. That very prince named the town after himself, Kudesheve.

The modern name Mala Vyska was given by Kniaz Ulashyn, who happened to buy Kudashev's land in the middle of the 19th century.

Until 18 July 2020, Mala Vyska was the administrative center of Mala Vyska Raion. The raion was abolished in July 2020 as part of the administrative reform of Ukraine, which reduced the number of raions of Kirovohrad Oblast to four. The area of Mala Vyska Raion was merged into Novoukrainka Raion.

== Life in the present day ==
Nowadays, 6 districts constitute Mala Vyska. There are Mistechko (northern part of the town separated from the central part by the river Vysi); Mikrorayon Vysi (sleeping area of the town); Bessarabia (rural area of the town); Storchakivka; Kudrivka; Raion piaty hektar.

=== Education and cultural life ===
There are three secondary schools functioning in Mala Vyska and liceum. There is also a boarding school, youth centre, school of arts and two kindergartens. In the town there is a higher vocational school, where people can get secondary professional education. Cultural center functions in Mala Vyska. In this centre the Museum of Local History is placed. In addition, there is also a library named by Lesia Ukrainka.

=== Economy ===
In Mala Vyska there are some agricultural companies. "Mayak", "Zoriane", "Ptahivnyk", "Stepove" are among them:

Small business is particularly prolific in the town. There is a big number of specialized shops besides the town market in the town centre and three supermarkets.

Before the year 1993 sugar and spirit factory were functioning for a long period of time, providing Ukrainian Republic with their production in addition to exporting them into other countries.

=== Religion ===
The population of Mala Vyska are predominantly Orthodox. Due to this fact, there are three Orthodox churches in the town.

=== Mass media ===
In Mala Vyska Raion, a newspaper called "Malovyskivski Visti" is published. In addition, every organization and company's website or webpage can be found on the Mala Vyska official website.
