= Stepan Kozhumyaka =

Stepan Kozhumyaka

Kozhumyaka Stepan Demydovych (Russian: Kozhemyakin) (4 December 1898 – 31 August 1989) was a Ukrainian engineer, bridge-builder and linguist. He took an active part in the 1917–1920 struggle for national liberation, fighting for the cultural, moral and political rights of the Ukrainian people.

Kozhumyaka was born in 1898 in Novomyrgorod in the Yelysavetgrad (now Kirovograd) region, Ukraine. He graduated in 1917 from Yelysavetgrad as a teacher. While he was a student, he issued a magazine called Lisovyi Strumok ("Forest Brook"), in which he criticized the Soviet government. He played the bandura, wore Ukrainian national clothes, and spoke out about the events of 1918 in Ukraine.

In Novomyrgorod in 1922, Kozhumyaka began publishing an illustrated magazine, Persha Lastivka ("The First Swallow"). He took part in an agricultural community called "Rillya". Because of his sharp political views, he was fired from the position of head of Novomyrgorod School Number 4 and deprived of his membership of the Teachers' Union. He sought justice at the Yelysavetgrad Department of Education, and they sent him in 1923 to study in Odessa. In 1926 he got a degree in Social Upbringing, and in 1928 he graduated from the Language and Literature faculty in the Odessa Institute of People’s Education. His graduation paper was about Borys Grinchenko.

Kozhumyaka was due to pass his state exam in the spring of 1928, but at night on 7 March he was arrested and sentenced to three years in Yoshkar-Ola. Nevertheless, he got his diploma: on his return he graduated from Kharkiv Autoway Institute.

From 1932 - Linear engineer on highway construction in Cherkassy.

In 1937 he was arrested for anti-Soviet agitation and propaganda and sentenced to ten years in the concentration camp in Samara, Russia, where he worked in the aircraft factory, which provided the front with IL-14 and IL-15 aircraft. He was so weak that he expected to die, but was saved because of his knowledge of cement production technology. He was assigned to work on secret projects: he constructed a radio mast to replace the Moscow one and built a huge underground refuge for the Moscow government, in case pressure from German troops forced their evacuation. After his prison term he was freed and became a paid worker.

In 1949 Kozhumyaka was arrested for a third time because of his political views and driven to the eternal settlement in Krasnoyarsk Region. He did a lot to revive road-building in the Bolsheuluysky District. After Stalin's death he returned to Ukraine, and on 9 July 1958 the Cherkassy Regional Trial rehabilitated him.

Bridge-opening ceremony in Novomyrgorod

In 1954–1973 he worked as an engineer and road builder in Zla-topil and Novomyrgorod. The 417-km Cherkassy–Uman–Gaisyn road was made under his guidance. 1966-1973 he carried out projects and constructed bridges across the river Velyka Vys in Kirovograd Region, in places such as Velyka Vyska, Holovanivsk, Novomyrgorod, Haivoron, Martonoscha village, Kanizh, Panchevo, Rubaniy Mist and Korobchyno.

Kozhumyaka took an active part in Ukrainian national life. He organized the construction of the monument to Taras Schevchenko by sculptor Ivan Honchar in the village of Lypjanka. He left several memoirs, photos and letters to his friends, famous people like B. Antonenko-Dovydovych, M. Stelmah, I. Romanchenko and V.Lazoorskiy. His letters are a record of his philosophical, political and national views.

In 1969 he initiated a tradition of bringing March wreaths to the monuments to Taras Schevchenko in the Shpola Region. He exerted himself to publish works of progressive world literature and the UNESCO Courier magazine in Ukrainian. He made efforts to restore the ancient letter "ґ" (g) to the Ukrainian alphabet, uniting his friends and colleagues for the purpose. He also compiled the Autoway Dictionary himself.

In order to maintain interest and to promulgate a clear picture of Ukrainian history, Kozhumyaka published his own historical research under the titles "Brick Miracle", "St.Mykola’s Cathedral", "Monument to Cobsar" and others. He also wrote letters to the Supreme Rada, the Writers’ Union of Ukraine and the editorial offices of newspapers and magazines, demanding an end to language discrimination against the Ukrainian people and the distribution of politically important documents, including the United Nations Universal Declaration of Human Rights, "Internationalism or Russian assimilation?" by Ivan Dziuba and uncensored poems by Vasyl Symonenko.

Kozhumyaka argued for Ukraine to be recognized as an independent state and foretold its sovereignty. He believed that "an intelligent person is a light that should illuminate all the best qualities. He should lead and be an example of progress, justice, consciousness, truth and beauty".

Kozhumyaka aroused the national consciousness of the citizens of Ukraine. His literary heritage is still current. In July 2007 a Museum to Stepan Kozhumyaka was opened in Novomyrhorod.

== Sources ==
- Бондар Василь. Винниченко промовляє до земляків // Літературна Україна. – 1990. – 22 листоп.;
- Гончар Олесь. Щоденники. Спогади Олеся Гончара про Степана Кожум'яку. – К.: Веселка, 2008. – Т.2. (1968–1983). – С. 266–267;
- Лепеха Сергій. До діда, у курінь // Червона зірка. – 1991. – 20 жовт.;
- Маевская Ирина. Вольное поселение (книга). – М.: Возвращение, 1993. – 73 с.;
- Олійник Микола. Свята зріднила їх мета // Черкаський край. – 2000. – 24 берез.;
- Орел Світлана. Український аристократ з "куреня" // Дзеркало тижня. – 2009. – 28 лют. – 6 берез.;
- Орел Світлана. Юний Шевченко знову… в Новомиргороді // Слово просвіти. – 2010. – 13 лип.;
- Пісковий Володимир. За круглим столом радіостудії // Червона зірка. – 1988. – 15 верес.;
- Пісковий Володимир. Зразок поступу, справедливості, правди та краси // Новомиргородщина. – 2007. – 20 жовт.;
- Селецький Петро. Останній Міст // Молодий комунар. – 1988. – 14 трав.;
- Суржок Микола. А як ви себе почуваєте? // Вільний голос. – 1992. – 2 лип.;
- Устимів Б. Громада – великий чоловік // Народне слово. – 2010. – 1 лип.;
- Багацький Леонід. Тарасовими шляхами // Козацький Iнтернет-журнал "Cурма". – 2011. – 24 січ.;
- Степан Кожум'яка у пам'ятi очевидців // Спомини про Ст. Кожум'яку, записанi в 1992–1999 рр.;
- Степан Кожемяка. Письма из ссылки // Красноярское общество "Мемориал". – 2009. – 29 мая;
- Книга "Планида Степана Кожум'яки". Сер.: Життя славетних / Упоряд. та авт. передм. Ю. Колісник. – Черкаси: Брама, 2004. – 224 с.
- Презентація PowerPoint "Степан Кожум'яка": Життя й діяльність / Упоряд. Ю. Колісник, В. Олексенко. – Черкаси: 2010.
