= Tyshkivka, Haisyn Raion =

Tyshkivka Тишківка
- Village
- Location within Vinnytsia Oblast Location within Ukraine
- Coordinates: 48°47′40″N 29°35′13″E
- Country: Ukraine
- Oblast: Vinnytsia Oblast
- Raion: Haisyn Raion
- Hromada: Krasnopil rural hromada
- Established: 1600

Area
  - Total: 1,296 km^{2} (500 sq mi)

Population (01.01.2017)
  - Total: 109
  - Density: 0.0841/km^{2} (0.218/sq mi)
- Time zone: UTC+2 (EET)
  - Summer (DST): UTC+3 (EEST)
- Postal code: 23700

Tyshkivka (Ukrainian: Тишківка) is a village in the Krasnopil rural hromada, Haisyn Raion, Vinnytsia Oblast, Ukraine. Located 16 km east of the city of Haisyn and 2 km from the M30 highway.

== History ==
On November 7 (20), 1917, in accordance with the Third Universal of the Ukrainian Central Rada, it became part of the Ukrainian People's Republic.
