= Tyshkivka rural hromada =

Rural hromada of Kirovohrad Oblast, Ukraine

Tyshkivka rural hromada Тишківська сільська громада
- Hromada
- Location within Ukraine Kirovohrad Oblast Location within Ukraine
- Coordinates: 48°29′49″N 30°56′11″E
- Country: Ukraine
- Oblast: Kirovohrad Oblast
- Raion: Novoukrainka Raion
- Founded: June 12, 2020

Area
  - Total: 271.73 km^{2} (104.92 sq mi)

Population (2019)
  - Total: 3,957
- Website: https://tyshkivska.gromada.org.ua

Tyshkivka rural hromada (Ukrainian: Тишківська сільська громада, romanized: Tyshkivs'ka sil's'ka hromada) is a hromada in Novoukrainka Raion, Kirovohrad Oblast, Ukraine. The administrative center is the village of Tyshkivka.

The area of the hromada is 271.73 km², and the population is 3,957 inhabitans (2019). Formed on May 4, 2018 by merging the Haivka, Tyshkivka, and Fedorivka village councils of Dobrovelychkivka Raion.

The hromada includes 11 villages: Tyshkivka, Andriivka, Bohdanivka, Virne, Haivka, Novomykhaylivka, Novotyshkivka, Osykove, Pokazove, Popivka, Fedorivka.
