= Tyshkivka, Tyshkivka rural hromada =

Tyshkivka Тишківка
- Village
- Location within Ukraine Kirovohrad Oblast Location within Ukraine
- Coordinates: 48°29′49″N 30°56′11″E
- Country: Ukraine
- Oblast: Kirovohrad Oblast
- Raion: Novoukrainka Raion
- Hromada: Tyshkivka rural territorial hromada
- Established: 1743

Area
  - Total: 6,662 km^{2} (2,572 sq mi)

Population (2001)
  - Total: 3,497
  - Density: 0.5249/km^{2} (1.360/sq mi)
- Time zone: UTC+2 (EET)
  - Summer (DST): UTC+3 (EEST)

Tyshkivka is a village in Ukraine, which is center of the Tyshkivka rural territorial hromada in Novoukrainka Raion, Kirovohrad Oblast. The village is home to the Village Council of the Tyshkivka rural territorial hromada.

== History ==
In 1752–1764 it was part of the Novoslobodsk Cossack Regiment. In 1856, the village was part of the Bobrynetsky uezd of the Kherson governorate. At that time, there were 592 households in the village. As of 1886, Tyshkivka was part of the Novoarkhangelsk volost, Elisavetgrad uezd, Kherson governorate, and had a population of 3,810 people, 757 households, an Orthodox church, a school, 5 shops, 2 wine cellars, and a Rhenish cellar. At least 243 villagers died during the Soviet-organized Holodomor of 1932–1933.

In 1935–1957, Tyshkivka was the administrative center of the Tyshkivka raion. After the raion was abolished, the village became part of the Dobrovelychkivka raion. In 2020, the Dobrovelychkivka raion was disbanded, and the village became the center of the Tyshkivka rural territorial hromada of the Novoukrainka raion.

== See also ==
- List of settlements affected by the Holodomor of 1932–1933 (Kirovohrad Oblast)
