= Novomyrhorod =

City in Kirovohrad Oblast, Ukraine

Novomyrhorod Новомиргород
- City
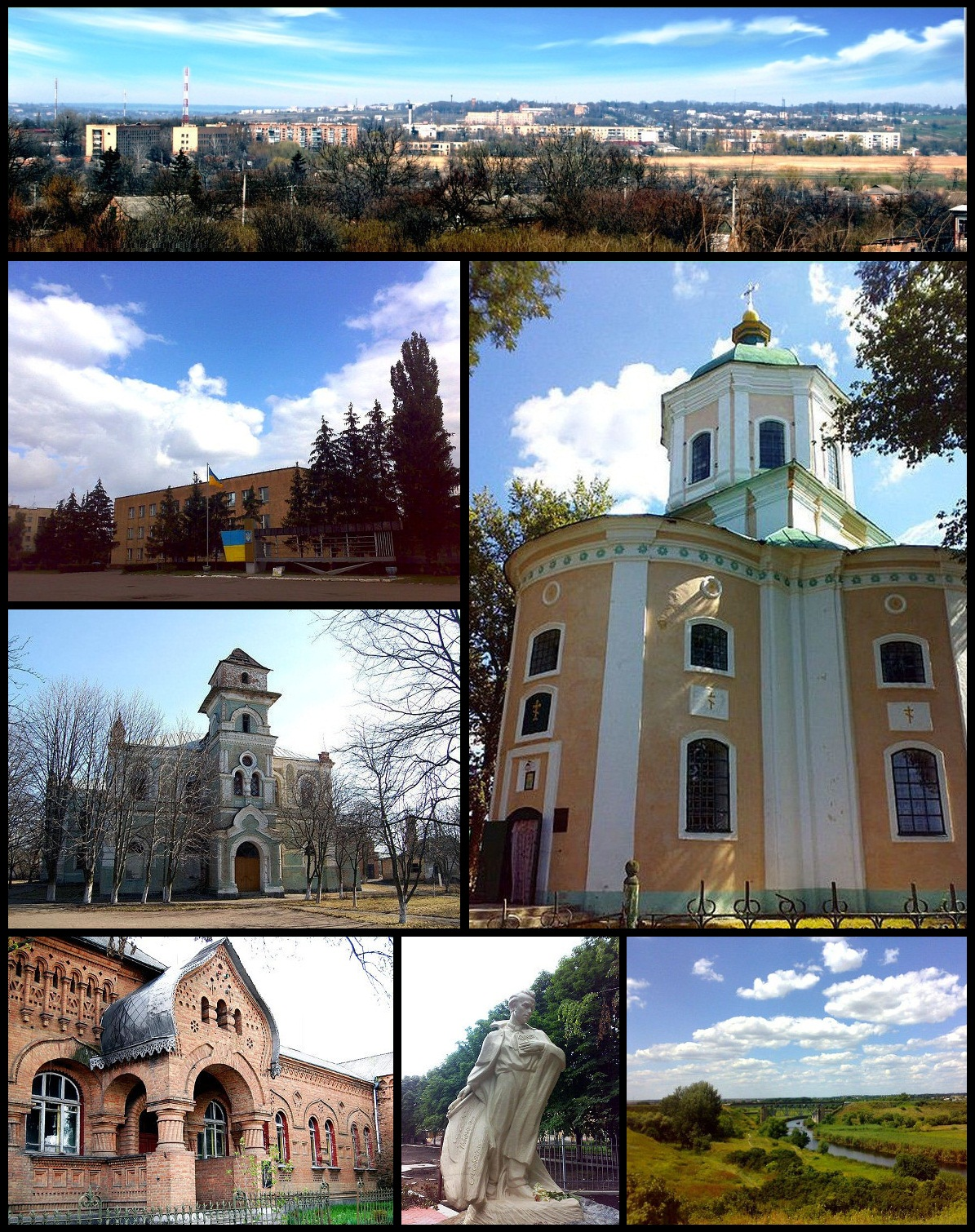
- Clockwise from top right: Skyline of the town; Elias Church (1786); Panski Hory Reserve; Monument to Taras Shevchenko; Former Hospital (1913); Zlatopil Gymnasium; Central Square

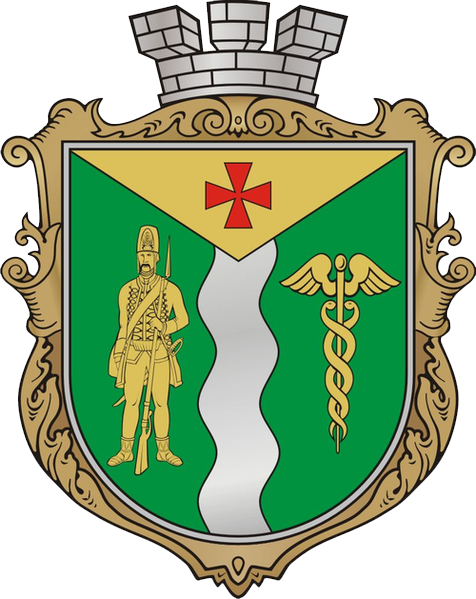
- Flag Coat of arms
- Interactive map of Novomyrhorod
- Location within Ukraine Location within Ukraine Kirovohrad Oblast
- Coordinates: 48°47′N 31°39′E
- Country: Ukraine
- Oblast: Kirovohrad Oblast
- Raion: Novoukrainka Raion
- Hromada: Novomyrhorod urban hromada

Area
  - Total: 88.52 km^{2} (34.18 sq mi)

Population (2022)
  - Total: 10,715
  - Density: 121.0/km^{2} (313.5/sq mi)
- Postal code: 26000-26001
- Area code: +380 5256
- Website: novomirgorod.com.ua

Novomyrhorod (Ukrainian: Новомиргород, IPA: [nowoˈmɪrɦorod]) is a city in Novoukrainka Raion, Kirovohrad Oblast, central Ukraine, in the southern part of the Middle Dnieper area. It hosts the administration of Novomyrhorod urban hromada, one of the hromadas of Ukraine. The population of Novomyrhorod is approximately 10,715 (2022 estimate).

Novomyrhorod is situated on the banks of the Velyka Vys River.

== Name and history ==
The name literally means "New Myrhorod" or "new peace town".The town was founded in 1746.

Between 1752 and 1764, Novomyrhorod was the capital of New Serbia, a military frontier established by the Russian Empire that had an ethnic Romanian majority.

Since 1802 it was a town in Kherson Governorate of Russian Empire.

Since 1923 Novomyrhorod was the district center of Yelysavethradsky District, Ukrainian SSR.

City since 1960.

In 1989 the population was 16 349 people.

In 2013 population was 11 569 people.

Until 18 July 2020, Novomyrhorod was the administrative center of Novomyrhorod Raion. The raion was abolished in July 2020 as part of the administrative reform of Ukraine, which reduced the number of raions of Kirovohrad Oblast to four. The area of Novomyrhorod Raion was merged into Novoukrainka Raion.

== Notable people ==
- Stepan Kozhumyaka (1898–1989) — Ukrainian engineer, bridge-builder and linguist
- Viacheslav Petrov (b. 1994) — Ukrainian professional basketball player.

== Gallery ==
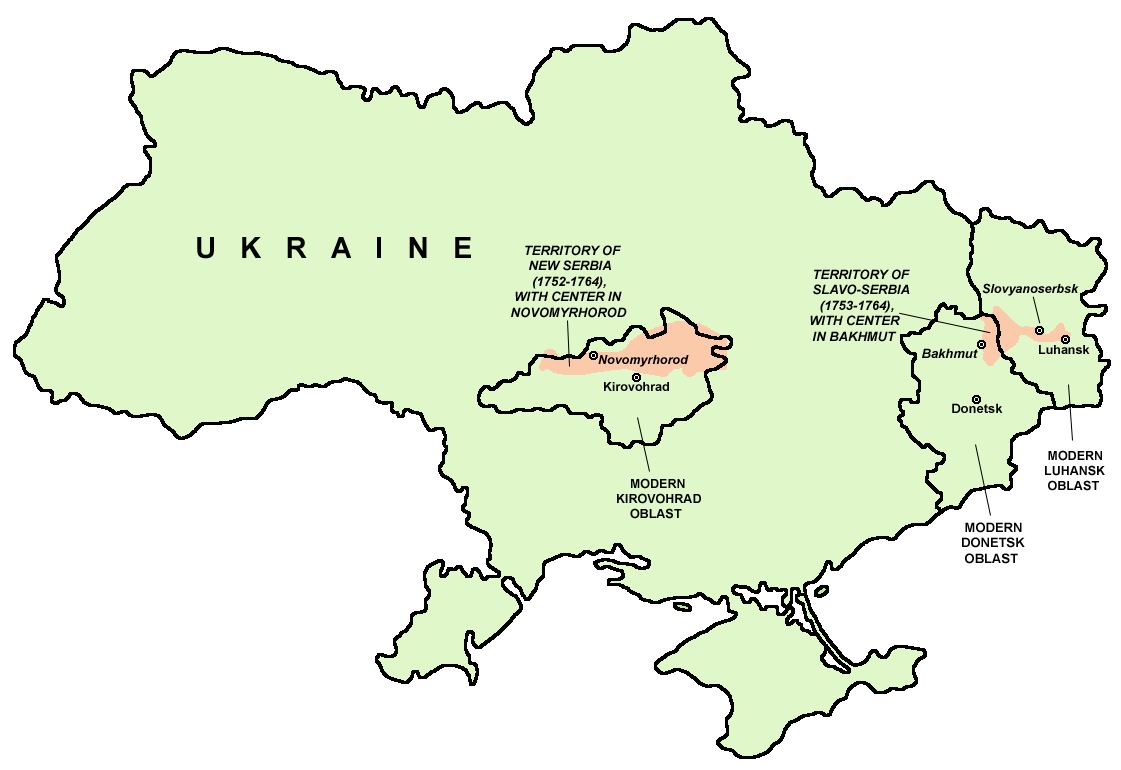
Location of Novomyrhorod and former New Serbia

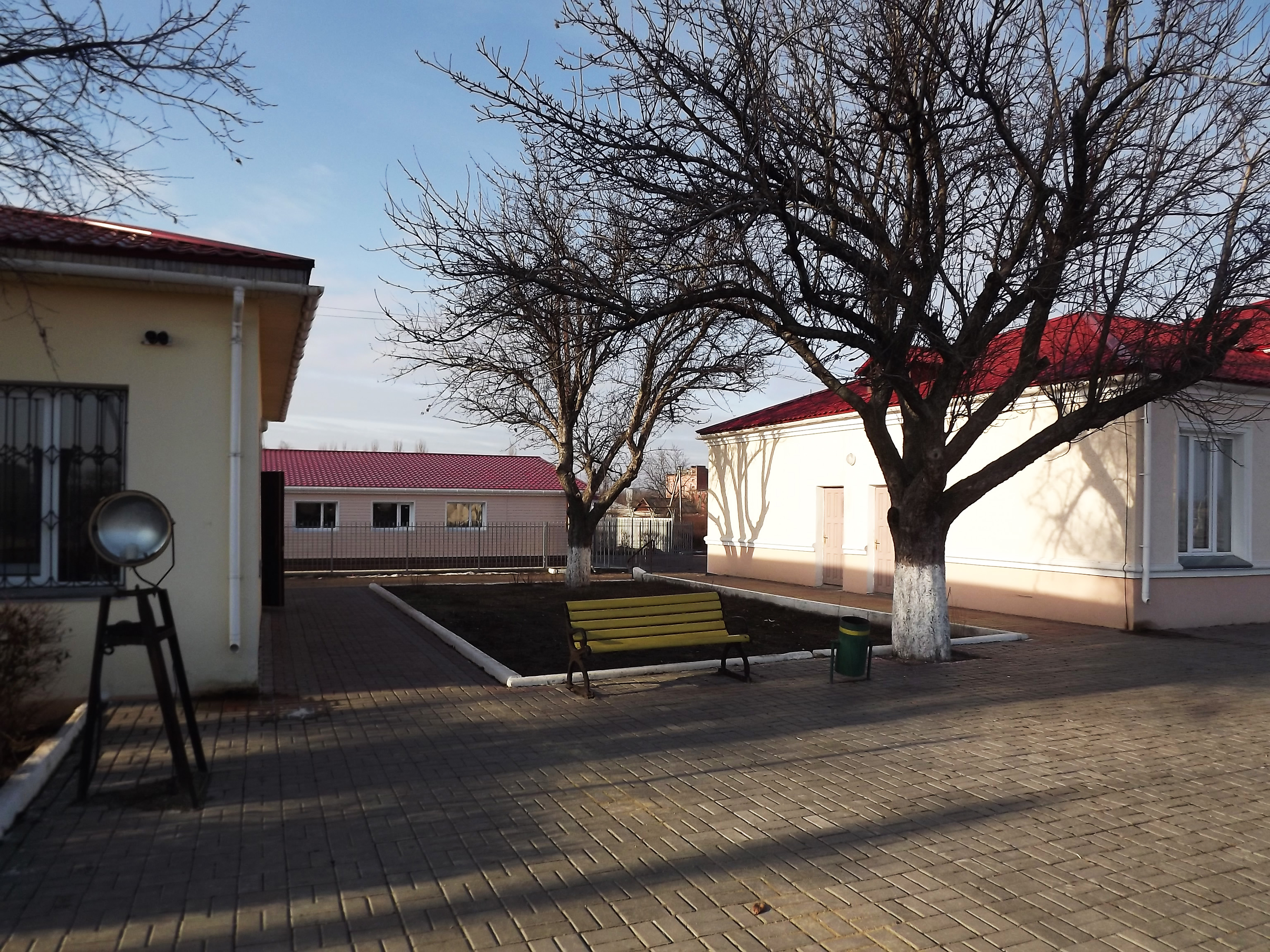
Novomyrhorod railway station

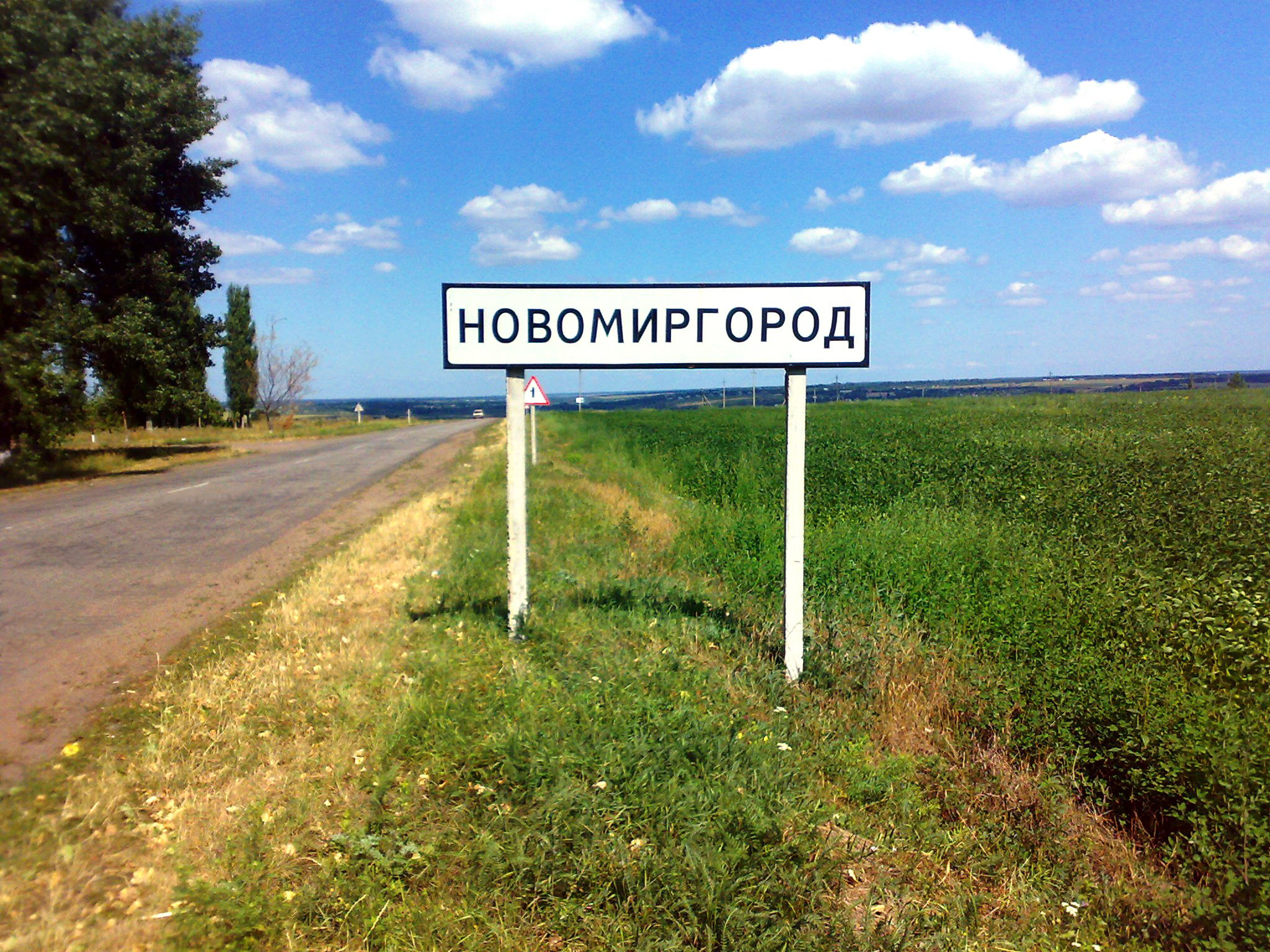
Entering the Novomyrhorod from the direction of Kropyvnytskyi

== See also ==
- Zlatopol — former town, Jewish shtetl, now it is a part of Novomyrhorod.
