= Dobrovelychkivka =

Rural settlement in Kirovohrad Oblast, Ukraine

Dobrovelychkivka Добровеличківка
- Rural settlement
- Location within Ukraine Kirovohrad Oblast Location within Ukraine
- Coordinates: 48.35°N 31.17°E
- Country: Ukraine
- Oblast: Kirovohrad Oblast
- Raion: Novoukrainka Raion
- Hromada: Dobrovelychkivka settlement hromada
- Established: 18 December 1776
- Founder: Major Velychkivskyi

Population (2022)
  - Total: 5,358
- Time zone: UTC+2 (EET)
  - Summer (DST): UTC+3 (EEST)
- Postal Code: 27000-27005

Dobrovelychkivka (Ukrainian: Добровеличківка) is a rural settlement in Novoukrainka Raion, Kirovohrad Oblast, southern Ukraine. Dobrovelychkivka hosts the administration of Dobrovelychkivka settlement hromada, one of the hromadas of Ukraine. The population of the settlement is 5,358 (2022 estimate).

== Geography ==
Dobrovelychkivka is located in the western part of Dnieper Upland. It is noted for being the purported geographical center of Ukraine.

== History ==
The settlement was founded as a khutir in 1776 by Major Velychkivskyi, who sold it next year to poruchik Revutskyi.

Until 1883, it was known as Revutske.

Until World War I,

Halyna Kuzmenko, wife of Nestor Makhno, lived in the settlement. In 1916, she graduated from the settlement's Women Teachers Seminary.

Dobrovelychkivka was occupied by Nazi Germany on 1 August 1941, during World War II. Jewish homes were soon registered and marked with Stars of David. In late December 1941, all Jews from the town were taken to the village of Maryevka and shot to death. Dobrovelychkivka was liberated from Nazi Germany by the Red Army on 17 March 1944.

Until 18 July 2020, Dobrovelychkivka was the administrative center of Dobrovelychkivka Raion. The raion was abolished in July 2020 as part of the administrative reform of Ukraine, which reduced the number of raions of Kirovohrad Oblast to four. The area of Dobrovelychkivka Raion was merged into Novoukrainka Raion.

Until 26 January 2024, Dobrovelychkivka was designated urban-type settlement. On this day, a new law entered into force which abolished this status, and Dobrovelychkivka became a rural settlement.

== Economy ==
Dobrovelychkivka hosts a regional bazaar on Wednesday and Friday mornings.
