= Dobrovelychkivka Raion =

Former subdivision of Kirovohrad Oblast, Ukraine

Dobrovelychkivka Raion Добровеличківський район
- Raion
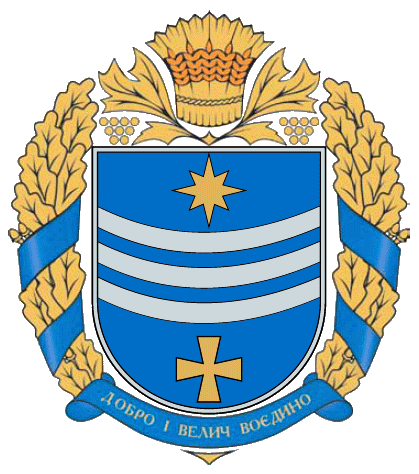
- Flag Coat of arms

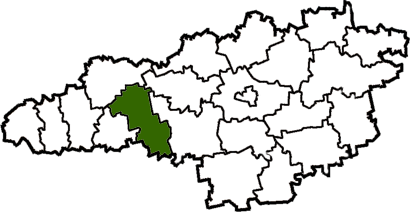
- Coordinates: 48°22′10″N 31°9′48″E
- Country: Ukraine
- Region: Kirovohrad Oblast
- Established: 1923
- Disestablished: 18 July 2020
- Admin. center: Dobrovelychkivka
- Subdivisions: List: 1 — city councils; 1 — settlement councils; 17 — rural councils; Number of localities: 1 — cities; 1 — urban-type settlements; 61 — villages; — rural settlements

Government
  - Governor: Oleg Yaremenko

Area
  - Total: 1,297 km^{2} (501 sq mi)

Population (2020)
  - Total: 32,511 ▼
  - Density: 25.07/km^{2} (64.92/sq mi)
- Time zone: UTC+02:00 (EET)
  - Summer (DST): UTC+03:00 (EEST)
- Postal index: 27000 — 27043
- Area code: +380 5253
- Website: http://dv.kr-admin.gov.ua/

Dobrovelychkivskyi Raion was a raion (district) of Kirovohrad Oblast in central Ukraine. The administrative center of the district was the urban-type settlement of Dobrovelychkivka. The raion was abolished on 18 July 2020 as part of the administrative reform of Ukraine, which reduced the number of raions of Kirovohrad Oblast to four. The area of Dobrovelychkivka Raion was merged into Novoukrainka Raion. The last estimate of the raion population was 32,511 (2020 est.).

At the time of disestablishment, the raion consisted of four hromadas:

- Dobrovelychkivka settlement hromada with the administration in Dobrovelychkivka;
- Pishchanyi Brid rural hromada with the administration in the selo of Pishchanyi Brid;
- Pomichna urban hromada with the administration in the city of Pomichna;
- Tyshkivka rural hromada with the administration in the selo of Tyshkivka.
