= Novoukrainka Raion =

Subdivision of Kirovohrad Oblast, Ukraine

Novoukrainka Raion Новоукраїнський район
- Raion
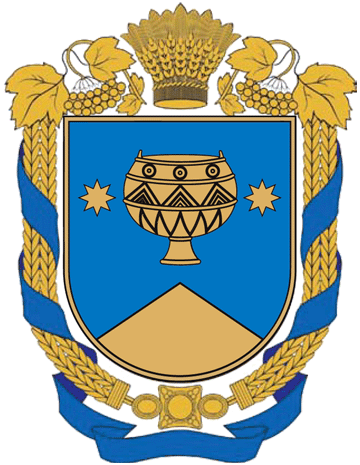
- Flag Coat of arms

- Coordinates: 48°18′13″N 31°38′34″E
- Country: Ukraine
- Oblast: Kirovohrad Oblast
- Established: 1921
- Admin. center: Novoukrainka
- Subdivisions: 13 hromadas

Government
  - Governor: Valerii Savenko

Area
  - Total: 5,202.9 km^{2} (2,008.9 sq mi)

Population (2022)
  - Total: 135,842
  - Density: 26.109/km^{2} (67.622/sq mi)
- Time zone: UTC+02:00 (EET)
  - Summer (DST): UTC+03:00 (EEST)
- Postal index: 27100—27167
- Area code: +380 5251
- Website: http://nu.kr-admin.gov.ua

Novoukrainka Raion is a raion (district) of Kirovohrad Oblast in central Ukraine. The administrative center of the district is the town of Novoukrainka. Population: 138,842 (2022 estimate).

On 18 July 2020, as part of the administrative reform of Ukraine, the number of raions of Kirovohrad Oblast was reduced to four, and the area of Novoukrainka Raion was significantly expanded. Three abolished raions, Dobrovelychkivka, Mala Vyska, and Novomyrhorod Raions, were merged into Novoukrainka Raion. The January 2020 estimate of the raion population was 39,968 (2020 est.).

== Subdivisions ==
=== Current ===
After the reform in July 2020, the raion consisted of 13 hromadas:

- Dobrovelychkivka settlement hromada with the administration in the rural settlement of Dobrovelychkivka, transferred from Dobrovelychkivka Raion;
- Hannivka rural hromada with the administration in the selo of Hannivka, retained from Novoukrainka Raion;
- Hlodosy rural hromada with the administration in the selo of Hlodosy, retained from Novoukrainka Raion;
- Mala Vyska urban hromada with the administration in the city of Mala Vyska, transferred from Mala Vyska Raion;
- Marianivka rural hromada with the administration in the selo of Marianivka, transferred from Mala Vyska Raion;
- Novomyrhorod urban hromada with the administration in the city of Novomyrhorod, transferred from Novomyrhorod Raion;
- Novoukrainka urban hromada with the administration in the city of Novoukrainka, retained from Novoukrainka Raion;
- Pishchanyi Brid rural hromada with the administration in the selo of Pishchanyi Brid, transferred from Dobrovelychkivka Raion;
- Pomichna urban hromada with the administration in the city of Pomichna, transferred from Dobrovelychkivka Raion;
- Rivne rural hromada with the administration in the selo of Rivne, retained from Novoukrainka Raion;
- Smoline settlement hromada with the administration in the rural settlement of Smoline, transferred from Mala Vyska Raion;
- Tyshkivka rural hromada with the administration in the selo of Tyshkivka, transferred from Dobrovelychkivka Raion;
- Zlynka rural hromada with the administration in the selo of Zlynka, transferred from Mala Vyska Raion.

=== Before 2020 ===
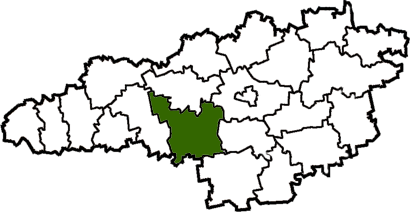
Novoukrainka Raion in Kirovohrad Oblast before 2020

Before the 2020 reform, the raion consisted of four hromadas:

- Hannivka rural hromada with the administration in Hannivka;
- Hlodosy rural hromada with the administration in Hlodosy;
- Novoukrainka urban hromada with the administration in Novoukrainka;
- Rivne rural hromada with the administration in Rivne.
