= Kropyvnytskyi Region Universal Research Library =

Library in Ukraine

Kropyvnytskyi Regional Universal Research Library named after D. Chyzhevskyi
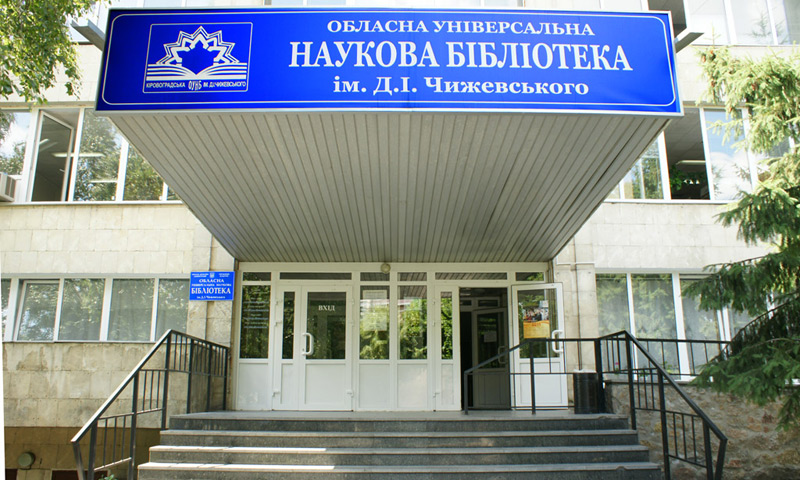
- The main building of the Regional Universal Research Library named after D. Chyzhevskyi; Kropyvnytskyi
- Location: Big perspective St., 24, Kropyvnytskyi, 25006, Ukraine
- Type: Universal Research
- Established: February 2, 1899

Collection
- Size: 766,000 copies

Access and use
- Circulation: 616,000
- Population served: 33,000 users

Other information
- Director: Olena Harashchenko
- Employees: 128
- Website: www.library.kr.ua

The Kropyvnytskyi Regional Universal Research Library (RURL) is one of the oldest research libraries in Ukraine and the largest in the region. The library was named after D.I. Chyzhevskyi. It has universal books and documents on traditional and modern media. It houses collections of precious and rare publications and is the depositary of publications on local lore.

== Library History ==
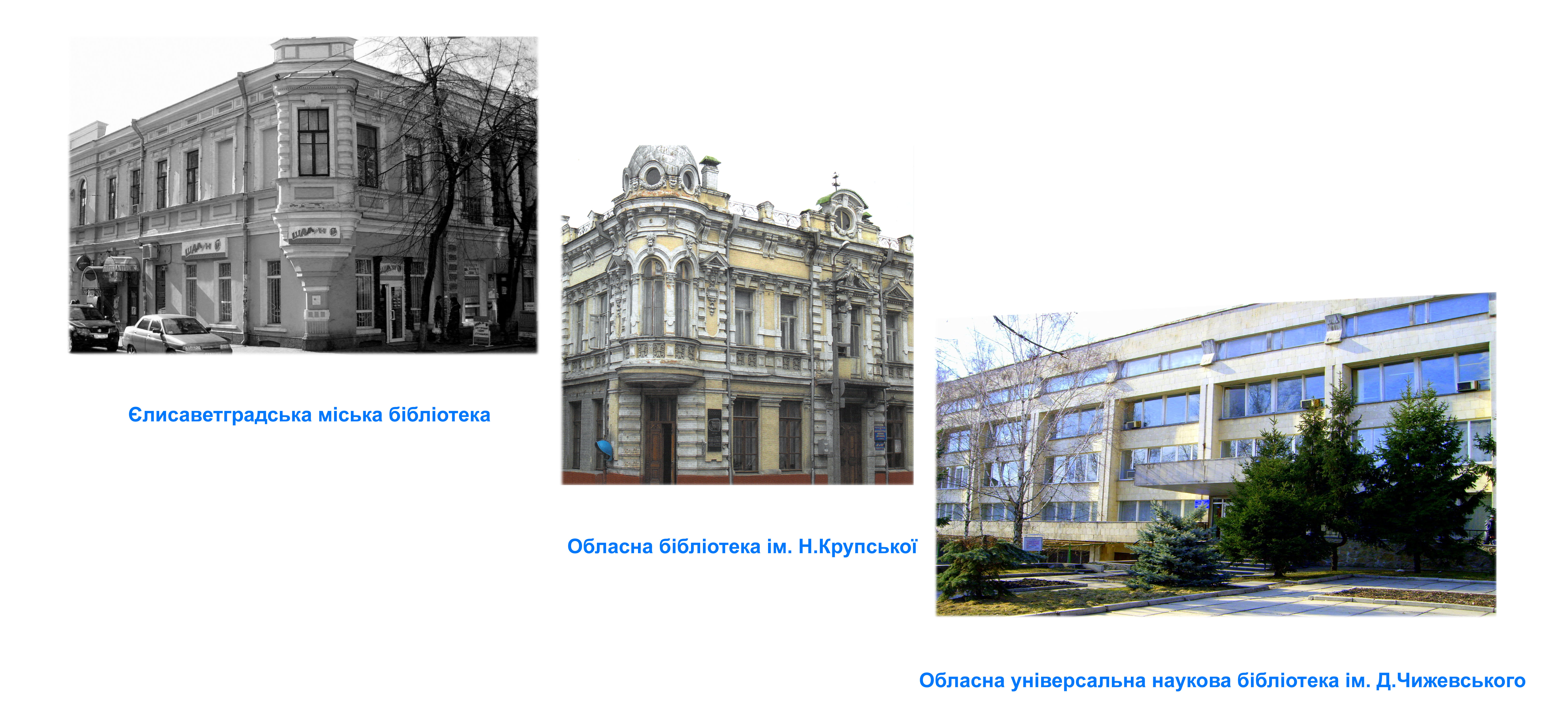
Library History

1889..........	Citizens of Yelisavetgrad request the Internal Affairs Ministry to establish a public Library
January 1, 1897..........	Public appeal to city mayor O. M. Pashutin for permission to hold a meeting for the library status approval.
April 19, 1897 ..........	First general meeting of the founders of the public library. First Library Board is elected.
July 17, 1897..........	Approval of the Elisavetgrad public library status.
February 2 (February,15) 1899	First public library opens on the corner of Ingulska St. and Dvirtseva St. It works as a reading parlor.
March 19, 1899..........	Library starts to lend books to readers.
September 1, 1900 ..........	Public library moves to the S. K. Ostrouhov House on Great Perspective Street.
1904..........	Establishment of commission for books acquisition.
1909..........	Making a decision on construction special premises for the library.
1911..........	Making a decision on creating card catalog for readers.
1918..........	Establishing a book store on Dvirtseva St. in implementation of the decree of November 29, 1918 "On the requisition of libraries, book stores and books in general."
1919..........	Creation of a County department of Public Education in Elisavetgrad.
March 1, 1920 ..........	Elisavetgrad Central Library opens on Decembrists Street. Jakov Illich Lyubarsky is elected Head of the Central Library.
1921..........	Creation of Gubernia Accounting and Distribution Committees (Gurki) at provincial Departments of Education.
1922..........	“Regulation on the Unified Library Network of the Republic" is adopted. Under this regulation the library network receives official operating approval.; The library also begins receiving a mandatory (statutory) copy of all printed documents.
1923..........	Library is allowed to sell doublets of publication copies and to use money from their realization for acquisition.; In connection with the reorganization of Elisavetgrad County into Elisavetgrad district Library is renamed Elisavetgrad District Central Library.
1924..........	Yelisavetgrad is renamed to Zinov'yevsk. Library changes name to Zinov'yevska District library.
June 9, 1926..........	Per the order of the Zinov'yevsk County Executive Committee of the Council of Workers, Peasants and Red Army Deputies from 04.06.1926, No. 5153, the library is renamed into N. K. Krupskaya District Central Library.
1929..........	CPSU (b) adopts the Resolution "On the improvement of Library Work" (October 30, 1929). To its implementation unfolds "Library Campaign" aimed at "funds cleansing" and repressive actions against librarians, the so-called "enemies of people”.
1932..........	The library starts providing interlibrary loan services.
1937..........	Library bears the name N. K. Krupskaya Odessa Regional City Central Library, city of Kirov.
1939..........	Kirovohrad region is formed under The Decree of the Presidium of the Supreme Soviet of the USSR of 10 January 1939. Kirov is renamed into Kirovohrad.; The Central City Library begins to function as the regional library and is renamed into N. K. Krupskaya Kirovohrad Regional Library.
August 5, 1941..........	Kirovohrad is occupied by German troops
1941..........	Kosovs’ka Inna Sergiyvna acts as Library Director
January 1, 1942 ..........	Eugene Belinsky is appointed Library Director
January 8, 1944 ..........	Kirovohrad is freed from Nazi occupation
January 15, 1944 ..........	Inna Kosovo is appointed Director of N. K. Krupskaya Regional Library by the Regional Library Order No. 1
May 1, 1944..........	Library re-opens its doors to readers
1945..........	Establishment of the Department of Cultural and Educational work
1946..........	The library receives assistance from the Government Fund in Moscow–in the form of 5631 books
March 1947 ..........	The USSR Council of Ministers adopts the Resolution "On Measures for Strengthening Regional and Rural libraries"
1947..........	The Regional Committee of the Ukrainian CP (b) adopts the resolution "On Strengthening Cultural-Educational Institutions"
July 1947 ..........	O. Solovyov is named Library Director
1948..........	Library participates in the Socialist Competition with the Poltava and Odessa libraries
1949..........	Library was deprived of the mandatory copy
March 1950..........	Per the USSR Council of Ministers Order No. 1490 from 3 December 1947, the Library establishes 11-month courses for preparing librarians to work in district libraries
1951..........	The Library again starts to receive gratuitous all-union mandatory book copies
1952..........	Apprentice training of librarians for rural libraries on the basis of N. Krupskaya Regional library is officially approved
August 10, 1955 ..........	Nalyvaiko E.I. is appointed N. K. Krupskaya Library Director by the Department of Culture order
June 1957..........	Patent department is established at Kirovohrad N. Krupskaya Regional Library
1959..........	284 libraries of the region implement a new form of service - open access to books and documents
1960..........	In connection with implementing a new system of books classification librarians carry out modifications to the systematic catalog
May 18, 1960 ..........	Order of the library director canceled collecting mortgage for the books from readers of the Regional N. K. Krupskaya Library
January 1962 ..........	Library introduces unified library card service
March 1, 1962 ..........	Departments of library interloan and correspondence loan are separated off the Book Storage Department into an independent unit
1965..........	N. K. Krupskaya Regional Library closes its so-called "special literature fund"
1973..........	Some structural changes take place. The Department of Foreign Literature opens at the library, with Ella Yanchukova as its head (from 1978 - Goncharova L.N heads this department)
1976..........	Changes in the Library leadership. Up to 1976 Petro Pivnyak served as Library Director; from 1976 to 1983 - Maria Babenko served as Library Director
1978..........	Two new structural units are formed: Department of Arts, headed by Ella Yanchukova, and Sector of Information on Cultural Affairs
1979..........	The Library celebrates the 110th anniversary of the birth of N. K. Krupskaya - the Soviet political, cultural and party public figure, after whom the library is named. That same year, the Department of Arts makes a television show of the art magazine "Sources". The twelve programs promote books on art, prominent figures of the land, and art teams of the region
1980..........	The Library introduced additional charged services.; Library launches the Movie Club "Screen".
1982..........	Library relocates into new premises on Karl Marx St., 24
February 1982 ..........	Demeschenko L. I. is appointed Library Director
1983..........	Library establishes permanent exhibitions of paintings by Kirovohrad artists
1984..........	Soviet-Bulgarian Friendship Room opens
1985..........	Room for New Revenues is opened.; In implementation of the decisions of the CPSU Central Committee "On Measures to Prevent Drunkenness and Alcoholism" unfolds extensive propaganda of literature on sober lifestyle.
1987..........	Conversion of funds and directories to the new standards of Library-Bibliographical Classifications (LBC) System
1988..........	Establishment of exhibitions of pre-revolutionary editions from the Library fund
1991..........	Collapse of the Soviet Union
January 1991 ..........	Library establishes Department of Local History and Rare Books
August 1991 ..........	Library Director L. Demeschenko participates in the International Federation of Library Associations and Institutions (IFLA) conference in Moscow
March 1993..........	The Library is renamed in honor of D. I. Chyzhevskyi
October 1993..........	Club “Pereveslo” renews its activity
1994..........	The Library receives books from O. B. Ilyin collection
April 1994..........	Celebration of the 100th anniversary of the birth of D. I. Chyzhevskyi
July 1994 ..........	Library Director L. Demeschenko is awarded the title "Honored Worker of Culture of Ukraine"
1995..........	Library receives financial assistance from the International Renaissance Foundation in support of the program "Language - Communication Without Borders" introduced by O. Harashchenko
1995..........	Library joins the International Library Association
1996..........	for the first time the automation library system IRBIS was used in Ukrainian language; The automated library system IRBIS is used in the Ukrainian language for the first time
June 1996..........	Library staff participates in the Third International Conference "Libraries and Associations in a changing world: new technologies and new forms of cooperation" CRIMEA – 96”
1997..........	The library establishes the Marketing, Advertising, and Coordination of Mass Work Department
1997..........	The library introduces computer technologies for processing and description of documents
March 1997..........	The Library creates an electronic Library catalog
1998..........	Literary club "Yevshan" is established
August 1998 ..........	Olena Harashchenko is named Library Director
1998..........	Two projects for modernizing library local computer network introduced by Volokhin A. and D. Yashchenko receive grants from the International Renaissance Foundation and Open Society Fund from Budapest
1998..........	Library Web-site www.library.kr.ua is created
1998..........	Library Prize named after D.Chyzhevskyi is established
February 1999..........	The Library celebrates its 100th anniversary and holds an international conference: "Libraries at the Turn of the Century"
1999..........	Library joins the international mega-project "Pushkin Library", which is dedicated to the 200th anniversary of the birth of Alexander Pushkin
1999..........	The first free video-lending department in Ukraine is opened in Department of Arts
1999..........	Library subscribes to full-text electronic databases "EBSCO" and "SPRINGER”
1999..........	Library hosts the international conference "Consolidation. Initiative. Creativity" as part of «10 +10 " project (a partnership between Ukraine and Latvia)
2000..........	International Renaissance Foundation fund enables the creation of an Electronic Books Museum.; The Program for Preservation of Library and Archives Funds of Kirovohrad region for 2000-2005 is adopted. Regional state administration Head issues an order "On providing D.I. Chyzhevskyi Regional Universal Research Library with mandatory free copies of documents published in the region". Library launches an electronic database on regional studies, and creates an Online Center for Cooperative Cataloging for Ukrainian libraries (CUCC). British Council in Ukraine opens an information center "British Corner. International Fund "Renaissance" enables creation of Electronic Books Museum.
2001..........	Library launches new electronic databases "Music scores", "Documents on alternative media"; implementation of the project of the U.S. Embassy in Ukraine Information and Resource Center "Window on America"; Library partners with U.S. Embassy in Ukraine for creating the Information and Resource Center "Window on America". Library participates in the mega project "Pushkin Library". The information centre for regional studies "Portal - Kirovohrad Region" opens at the library.
2002..........	The library: • Installs building ramps for people with special needs. • Establishes legal consulting office. • Completes systematization of subject catalogues and bibliographical description of printed documents from Ilyin collection (in Russian and Ukrainian). Receives the Diploma of the Cabinet of Ministers of Ukraine for the staff's active work for preservation and promotion of Ukrainian and world literary heritage.
2003..........	• Library Director Harashchenko O.M. is awarded Note of Acknowledgement from the Cabinet of Ministers of Ukraine for significant contribution to the development of Ukrainian culture, professional skills and with Honors as the "Best Director of a Regional Universal Library”. • Creation of a new site subdivision "Chronicle of the Kirovohrad cultural life". • Creation and presentation of the digital book «The history of Central Ukraine". • Opening of Internet center, funded by the U.S. Embassy in Ukraine program "Library Electronic Access Program (LEAP)". Library hosts all-Ukrainian scientific-practical conference "Electronic Library Resources". Yvonne Hoft from Queens Library (NY) pays a visit to the Library with the aim of experience exchange. O. Harashchenko participates in broad panel session of the Ministry of Culture and Arts of Ukraine.
2004..........	• 105th anniversary of the founding of the library. • 110th anniversary of the birth of Dmitry Chyzhevskyi. • Creation of the Library wap-site. • Creation of video resources database at the Department of documents in foreign languages • Library participates in the European Commission project "CALIMERA": "Usage in culture: local institutions as intermediaries in organizing access to electronic resources". Creation of a new Web site subdivision "Archive of Dmitry Ivanovich Chyzhevskyi".
2005..........	Library joins Joint Information Service of Ukrainian libraries meant at providing bibliographical references in the on-line mode.; Creation of regional information portal "Kirovohrad region". Library establishes an exhibition and issues a CD-ROM "War Autograph" dedicated to the 60th Victory anniversary.
2006..........	Library opens reading room for researchers. Library presents an exhibition and issues "Jacov Pauchenko’s Abris" CD-ROM dedicated to the 140th anniversary of his birth. Library opens European Information Center. Library creates a new Web-site subdivision devoted to the life and works of Ivan Franko. Implementation of project "In harmony with nature", supported by S. Batory's fund “Solving local problems of local communities"
2007..........	• Library stages all-library book exhibitions competition. Library organizes and presents the international exhibition "Latvia Silhouettes"; Library participates in all-Ukrainian scientific-practical conference "Modern Times Ecological Problems " • Opening of gender center at library. • Library implements project "Functional limitations do not restrict our rights". • Creation of Kirovohrad regional cooperative Catalog (KRCC)
2008..........	• Canadian-Ukrainian Library Center opens. • Introduction of free wireless Internet throughout the library. Library participates in the international project "Global Library".
2009..........	• 110th Anniversary of D.I. Chyzhevskyi RURL. Library holds First International Scientific Conference under the title "The 21st century library: history, transformation, overcoming stereotypes".
2010..........	• Polish Cultural Center opens at the Library. • Bibliomist Regional Training Center opens at the library. • First regional forum for rural libraries of Kirovohrad Region. Library hosts the second international scientific conference, the theme of which is "Peace: the significance of libraries in shaping tolerance and spirituality of society".

In order to comply with decommunization laws Kirovohrad was renamed in July 2016 to Kropyvnytskyi.

== Organizational structure ==
The Kropyvnytskyi Regional Scientific Library Named After Chyzhevskyi has 20 structural units which are divided into customer service departments and departments that provide industrial and technological processes.

Registry Department carries out registration of users. Here one can get information on the basic rules of Library Policy, departments’ work schedule and library services.

Internet Center started its work in 2003 under the Program of the U.S. Embassy in Ukraine "Internet for Public Libraries Users “LEAP." At the Internet Center, people can use modern PCs to access high-speed Internet and get help from specially-trained librarians/consultants. Trainings are provided to users and the Internet Center enables users to access information free of charge.

City Circulation Department - is a popular department, it serves all categories of users. Here users can loan books and magazines. The fund consists of about 45 thousands publications in various fields of knowledge. Part of the fund (about 1000) is on media carriers, including documents on CD and DVD-ROMs. These are mainly encyclopedias, essays and term papers, documents of popular and entertaining nature, audio books. This department uses various forms of informing users: thematic literature exhibitions, displays of new editions, presentations of publications with authors’ participation. Here adults can select books, while their children spend their time playing with toys in a children's corner. For more than 10 years the department replenishes the fund of books of increased demand, which contains more than 1000 books, - these are novelty books of Ukrainian and foreign authors and the latest manuals on various disciplines.

The Arts Department is one of the cultural centers of the city and the region. It contains collections of albums, books and magazines, music scores, slides, a collection of recordings, audio and video materials of all kinds of art. Library patrons can utilize a bibliographic search, receive professional advice, listen to and record music, see presentations of the exhibitions of professional and folk artists, and attend master classes, lectures, concerts and performances. The cinema club "Screen" has met every Friday for over thirty years.

The Foreign Languages Department offers documents in 43 languages. Thanks to joint library projects, the department has received a large number of books and documents in electronic form from the U.S., UK, Germany, Canada, Japan and France. Department partners include the Goethe Institute, The Library of Congress, the British Council in Ukraine, and "Sabre-Svitlo" Foundation. Department patrons actively use computers, search for information on the Internet, and watch educational and feature films in their original languages. They also participate in foreign-language clubs free of charge.

The Department of Rare and Valuable Documents has more than 17,000 publications in its collection, including: ancient manuscripts of the 15th century in Old Slavonic language; early printed books by Fedorov, P. Mstislavets; Kiev-Pechersk editions with handwritten notes on the marginalia. Books from the Elisavetgrad Public Library constitute the basis of this collection. The department also contains books from private libraries of Polish composer Karol Szymanowski, General Alexander Samsonov, writer Vynnychenko, philosopher D. Chyzhevskyi and O. Ilyin collection, pre-revolutionary periodicals, a collection of miniature books, and masterpieces of modern art printing.

The Department of Economy, Production and Natural Sciences has scientific, industrial, reference, and educational literature on Economics, Technology, Agriculture, Design, Interior Design, Natural Sciences and Computer Technology. The department organizes book exhibitions, retrospective displays of documents, reading conferences, roundtables, photo exhibitions, quizzes, workshops and book presentations.

The Reference and Information Department offers access to the library's bibliographic resources (catalogs, card files, bibliography, encyclopedias, CD-ROMs). The Department gives full insight on the Library fund and allows one to select and order the necessary information, get factual and thematic references (either directly or with the help of a librarian-consultant). Reference, encyclopedic, bibliographic publications and CD-ROMs from various fields of knowledge, info-discs «Ukrainian Legislation" and Internet resources can satisfy all patrons's needs.

The Local History Department contains materials on the history, economics, social and political life, culture and art of the Kropyvnytskyi region. The department also conducts investigative and research work and maintains direct contacts with local publishing organizations, scientists, ethnographers, and writers. The department created and maintained the bibliographic database "Local history: database of analytical descriptions of newspaper articles of the Kropyvnytskyi region." The department also operates a public center of regional information, which encourages patrons to get acquainted with the orders of the Kropyvnytskyi Regional State Administration and Regional Council newsletters.

The Reading Halls’ Department oversees the areas of Humanities, Social Sciences, Philosophy and Law. It is one of the largest and most visited divisions in the Library where patrons can find books, reference editions and periodicals on history, philosophy, psychology, law, linguistics, medicine, literature. The department also schedules scientific and practical conferences, literary and musical evenings, and presentations of new publications.

Library structure includes departments that do not serve users, but are engaged in productive and technological processes necessary for proper work of customer service departments.

The Acquisitions Department - the primary purpose of this department is the replenishment of the library's collection with new national and foreign documents from all fields of knowledge and on various media. The department includes an exchange-reserve sector, whose employees perform work on the redistribution of literature and on additional literature acquisition for regional libraries.

The Division of Documents Processing and Catalog Maintenance – The primary purpose of this department is systematization and bibliographic descriptions of documents that the library obtains. The department is also responsible for organizing and maintaining the systems of electronic and card catalogs and the creation of specialized directories, which provide greater flexibility when taking into account the interests of users and significantly accelerate search for necessary publications.

Librarians of the Storage Department maintain the fund of permanent storage in order, and provide easy access to information for the patrons.

Automation Department – this department is tasked with expanding and maintaining the local library network and library equipment, providing technical support to library employees, and acquiring licensed software. Department employees also maintain the library facility; administer LIS (Library Information System) "Irbis" and the library's online electronic catalog; administer CUCC (Central Ukrainian Cooperative Catalog) and KRCC (Kropyvnytskyi Regional Cooperative Catalog); partners with the department of rare and valuable documents to create the electronic book museum. They introduce new electronic services on the Library Web-site, including its socialization with the help of Web 2.0 technologies.

Scientific-methodological Department and Sector of Sociological research – This department serves as the main base for best practices and training for regional libraries, the training center for computer knowledge dissemination for libraries all over Ukraine. Leading specialists of the library focus on advisory and practical assistance to specialists of the region, organize regional and local social studies.

== Library Services ==
=== Regional "Bibliomist" Training Centre ===
- Provides training on computer basics, effective use of advanced library technologies, promotes transformation of library work based on project, personnel management and library initiatives;
- Organizes and conducts IT literacy trainings for computer users of the city and the region;
- Develops and shares best practices of cooperation between libraries and local communities to strengthen the role of libraries and to provide new library services for users.

=== Canadian-Ukrainian Library Center ===
- Promotes publications on Ukrainian history, culture, literature and art that are printed in the west;
- Organizes informational and educational activities such as exhibitions, presentations, lectures, trainings, round tables, seminars, and tours which are aimed at increasing public awareness about the life of the Ukrainian Diaspora in Canada and the relationships between the two nations;
- Provides access to information resources on the Ukrainian Diaspora in Canada.

=== Polish Cultural Center ===
- Promotes Polish culture and the political and economic status of Poland;
- Maintains information on Polish-Ukrainian cooperative programs;
- Organizes informational and educational activities such as exhibitions, presentations, festivals, roundtables, and films review;
- Offers Polish language classes.

=== Center for European Information ===
- Increases public awareness about various aspects of European integration;
- Maintains electronic databases on European integration;
- Provides advice on finding information on European integration;
- Organizes informational and educational activities such as exhibitions, presentations, lectures, trainings, round tables, seminars, information days, etc.;
- Provides online consultations through a virtual reference portal.

=== Aarhus Information Centre ===
- Provides users with information on global environmental problems;
- Enhances the ecological education of the population;
- Hosts activities such as seminars, roundtables, exhibitions, literature reviews on environmental issues;
- Provides information summaries to customers.

=== Information and Resource Center "Window on America" ===
- Provides information about the USA;
- Promotes the cultural, political, and economic diversity of the USA;
- Conducts informational and educational activities;
- Hosts weekly movie club, where Native American speakers show films in English and lead post-film discussions;
- Provide free English-language classes, taught by native speakers using the newest educational methods.

=== Regional Information and Advisory Gender Center ===
- Conducts informational and educational activities on gender discrimination elimination, including overcoming stereotypes about the role of women and men in family and society;
- Promotes equal opportunity policies for women in the social, economic, political and cultural life of Ukraine;
- Advocates the right of women and men to receive quality, up-to-date information.

=== Legal Clinic ===
- Offers legal services free of charge every Thursday for various categories of citizens, first of all for the poor, disabled people and families with dependent children and also for single-parent families.

== Library funds ==
=== Structure of funds ===
The library fund includes 775,000 units. This is a collection of books, periodicals and serial publications, maps, music scores, editions on the figurative arts, manuscripts, early printed books, documents on alternative carriers in different languages. The fund contains Library Collection of Alexander Ilyin, books received under the mega-project "Pushkin Library", books donated by the Canadian Association of Friends of Ukraine and by "Polonia" (the Union of Poles of Kropyvnytskyi region), etc.

Each year, the library adds ten to twelve thousand new documents (books, pamphlets, magazines, newspapers, documents on electronic media, etc.) to its collection, from sources as diverse as publishers, bookstores, subscriptions, book exchanges (both domestic and international), and donations from public institutions, authors and sponsors. Based on data submitted by the city libraries, the library annually compiles a consolidated directory of Kropyvnytskyi periodicals.

=== Library Treasures ===
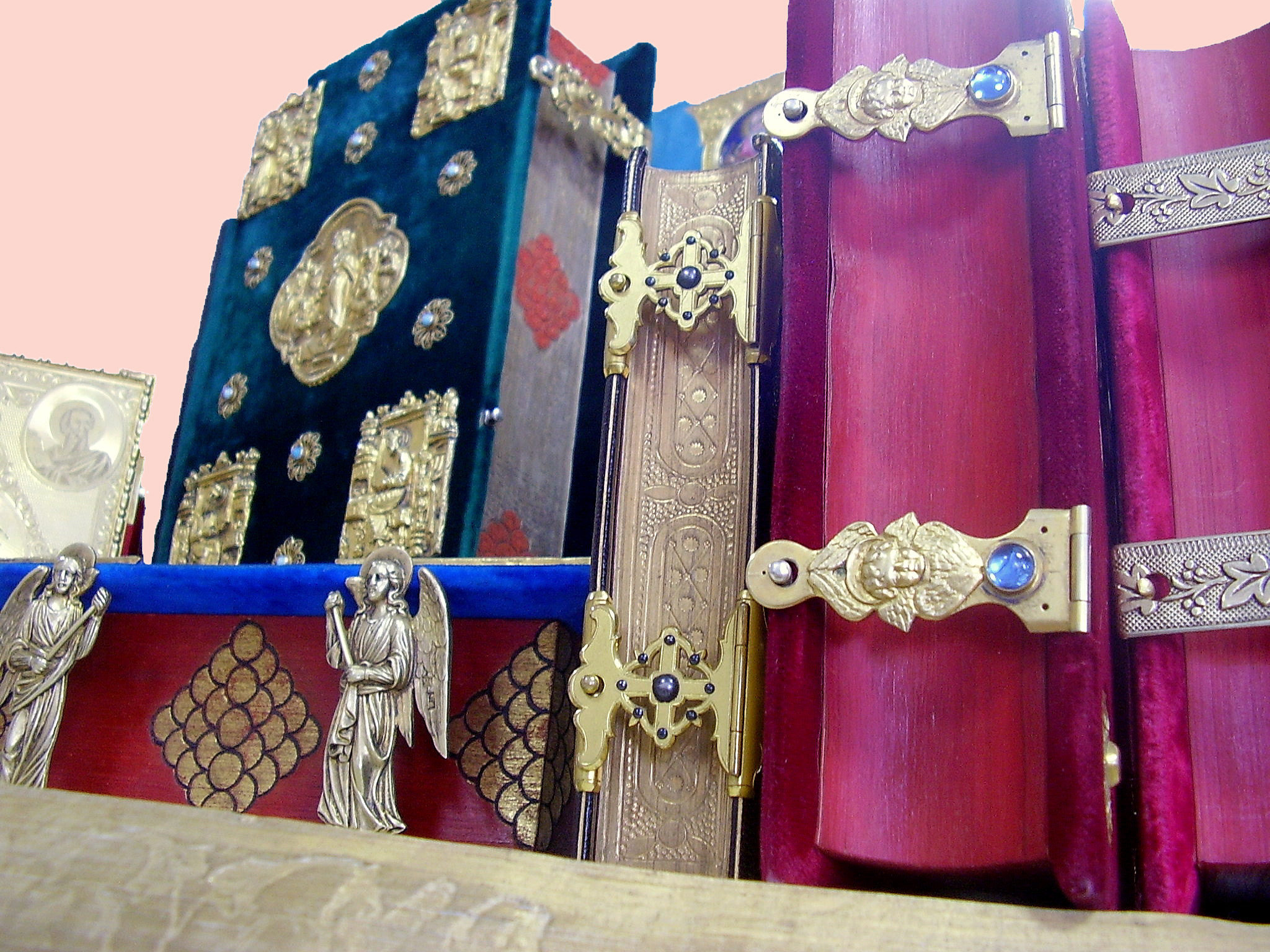
Rare and valuable documents

Some of the rare and valuable books in the library's collection include: - Two sheets of manuscript on parchment - 14th centuries.
- Handwritten Evangelistaries - mid. 16th century.
- Ostrog New Testament with Psalms (written from 1580 – 81. There are currently only 250 known copies in existence).
- Editions of Mstislavets P. and A. Nevezha (16th century). - Collection of Bibles from Fedorov to the present day (including two copies of the " Yelysavetynskaya Bible” (1758).
- " Flowery Triodion" with marginalia of donative contribution of this book to Kyrylivsky monastery by metropolitan Petro Mohyla in 1632.
- Editions of Lavra printing house of 17th-18th centuries.
- "Council code" of Tsar Alexei Mikhailovich, 17th century.
- "The Gospel" presented by the Empress Elizabeth to St. Trinity Church of St.Yelysaveta Fortress in 1760r.
- " Account of the Crowning of Elysaveta Petrovna" (1744r.) - the most luxurious edition of the 18th century.
- "Arithmetic" by L. Magnitsky (1703r.)
- Manuscript of "Reflections on Divine Liturgy" by Nikolai Gogol.
- Manuscripts of Pushkin and Lermontov (presumably).
- Lifetime editions of E. Hrebenka, M. Kropivnitsky, Pushkin, Gogol, Dostoevsky and other Russian and foreign classics.

== Library services ==
About thirty-three thousand readers use the library's informational resources, borrowing more than six hundred thousand documents on an annual basis. About 700 people visit the library daily – from scientists, to specialists, students and scholars, the elderly and the disabled. The employees of the D. Chyzhevskyi Regional Universal Research Library strive to promote awareness of and access to the library's collections by organizing exhibitions, literature displays, and conducting about a thousand educational and cultural events each year

In addition, more and more people address the library virtually: in 2010, the library's website received 600,000 visits, during which more than 1.5 million pages were viewed. A special category of subscribers are users of "Virtual Reference". In 2010 there were provided 430 virtual references.

== The Library’s Reference-Search engine ==
The library's work is based on a library reference search engine that includes traditional and electronic reference and bibliographic publications, library catalogs and card indexes.

Fund of reference and bibliographic publications includes documents of normative nature (laws, decrees, resolutions, etc.), encyclopedias, dictionaries, directories and bibliographic guides.

The system of library catalogs and card indexes includes a general alphabetic catalog and alphabetic and systematic catalogs for patrons organized according to Library Bibliographic Classification and Tables of Bibliographic Classification. Since 1997 data are entered into an electronic catalog that offers the following databases:

KNIGI - Database of books;
VIDEO - DB of videocassettes;
OUNBP-DB of periodicals;
INOST - Database of books of the Foreign Languages Department;
INPRE - Database of periodicals of the Foreign Languages Department;
KINO - Video Database of the Foreign Languages Department;
KRAY - Local History Department database;
KPKK - DB of regional periodicals;
ART - Database of the Arts Department;
MEDIA - Documents on alternative data carriers;
NOTY - DB of musical scores.

The local library information network has 98 computers. More than 230 full-text documents are posted on the Library Web-site.

== Scientific-methodical activity ==
Activities of the D. Chyzhevskyi Regional Universal Research Library and its appropriate structural units in the scientific and methodical realms are aimed at upgrading regional libraries management, studying different aspects of library work, conducting sociological studies, organizing continuing education of regional librarians, computerisation of libraries by further development of information resource centres, at providing guidance and practical assistance to them. The Department of Research and methodical work and sociological studies prepares a variety of analytical materials on different aspects of libraries’ work. Special attention is given to statistical and factual analysis of the libraries’ activities. The department issues annual surveys and information materials on the libraries work under the title: "Public libraries of Kirovohrad region", which provide statistical data and other important data. They also highlight trends in libraries’ development. The department published three issues of "Library orbit of Kirovohrad region". The Department annually prepares short information and analytical materials following the results of regional libraries work.

The department conducted the 1st stage of all-republican research "distribution among the regions of the books received under the state program of development and functioning of Ukrainian language for 2004-2010."

The library participated in the scientific study of the library fund (the scientific research of the National Parliamentary Library of Ukraine "Condition of public libraries’ funds in Ukraine," fund section - "Social Sciences" - Politics. History. Economics. Law by chronology, type, species, languages). The study was conducted on the basis of Novgorodskivska, Alexandria district libraries and Kirovohrad city centralized library system.

Latest sociological studies are aimed at clarifying readers' assessment of search and content characteristics of electronic library resources, at defining priorities of patrons in the election of search sources "Internet by users eyes," "Needs and requests of city loan department users and extent to which the fund satisfies them" and others. Latest sociological studies are aimed at assessing readers' estimation of search and content characteristics of electronic library resources, at defining patrons’ priorities in search sources "Internet through the eyes of the users" "Needs and demands of city loan department patrons. Does the fund satisfy them?", and others.

Every year the Library conducts trainings of the Region's librarians using seminars, workshops, creative laboratories, and master classes. Workshops are delivered at the D. Chyzhevskyi Regional Library and at the libraries of the region.

A regional review-competition "The best rural library of Kirovohrad region" was conducted in 2010. Its aim was to support and develop rural libraries of the region. First Regional Forum of Rural Kirovohrad librarians took place on September 30, 2010. Its goal was to attract attention of local authorities and the public to village libraries problems, to highlight their achievements, to honor the best libraries’ representatives, to determine priorities and perspectives of their development.

== Project Activities ==
The library is involved in project work that draws off-budget sources of financing, provides additional opportunities for replenishing information and material resources not only for D.I. Chyzhevskyi RURL., but also for the Region libraries. The library is engaged in project activities since 1995. The project "Network of Civic Education" realized in cooperation with the NGO Regional Information Service for contemporary Women's Issues (OZHIS), and which lasts for more than 10 years now, can be given as an example of a success story. This project allowed computerizing and providing internet access to almost all district and city libraries of the region. Their staff was trained to work with computers and to search for information on the Internet. It is aimed at diversifying and increasing quality of information services for libraries’ patrons. The "Fair of social initiatives" received wide response in the region. It was attended by the representatives of 17 information-resource centers from central district and city libraries of the Kirovohrad region. The fair brought to light the most successful social initiatives of NGOs, regional institutions and citizens aimed at solving socially important problems by the efforts of the local community without drawing from local budgets. The information on the project "Network of Civic Education" and in general on the activities of the regional information service for Women's Issues can be found at https://web.archive.org/web/20111227102115/http://www.ozis.kr.ua/

The EC project "Usage in Culture: Local institutions as intermediaries in organizing access to electronic resources» (CALIMERA) was among the most important and resonant. This project was financed under the program “Information society technologies (IST)” and it was in action for eighteen months (2004–2005). The project involved 47 countries: full and associate members of the European Union, it also envisaged participation of Russia, Ukraine, Belarus, Georgia and Kazakhstan.

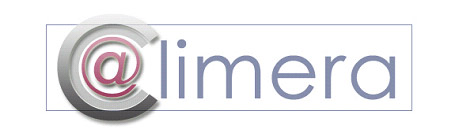
The EC project "Usage in Culture: Local institutions as intermediaries in organizing access to electronic resources"

Ukraine became a full participant in this project. Ukraine was represented by Kropyvnytskyi D.I.Chyzhevskyi Regional Universal Research Library. It led a group of experts representing libraries, museums and archives of Kropyvnytskyi region. The project was aimed at giving citizens access to modern information services in any European country through coordination of actions of cultural institutions (libraries, museums, archives), creation of advanced networks and systems helping to use various databases on knowledge and education. Studying of the best innovative experience, organization of a stable pan-European infrastructure accumulating and disseminating via the Internet digitized information on cultural heritage at local and European levels became the key elements of the project. A briefing meeting, held in the capital of the European Union, Brussels gave a start to this project. Ukraine was represented there by Helen Garashchenko, Director of RURL. All participants, and there were about 100 of them, got informed on the priorities of the European Union in the library, museum, archives affairs and on the sixth Framework Programme - Frame Programme 6 (FP6).

Over the past two years the Library is active in the All Ukrainian program "Bibliomist" - partnership program of IREX (International Research and Exchanges Board), USAID (U.S. Agency for International Development) and the Ministry of Culture and Tourism of Ukraine. Bill and Melinda Gates Foundation gave a $25 million grant in support of this project.

"Bibliomist" helps libraries to better meet the needs of local communities through training people modern technologies usage. The main goals of the program are as follows: to equip libraries with techniques for giving community members better access to information, to train librarians how to use new technologies for serving their patrons; to develop the resource database of the Library Association for more effective representation of the interests of libraries and librarians and for enlisting governmental support in recognition of the libraries’ role in society. A regional training center was established at the Library under this Project.

== International cooperation ==
Library is engaged in a broad international cooperation in the field of library science, it maintains close relationships with libraries in other countries and with international professional organizations. Library Specialists take part in international conferences and seminars. They did trainings at Libraries of Latvia, Germany, USA, Poland, Denmark, Finland and other countries. They also conduct annual scientific - practical conferences at their library. The library staff developed and implemented a number of projects supported by the International Fund "Renaissance", the Peace Corps, the Canadian Cooperation Fund, Public Affairs Section of U.S. Embassy, Open Society Institute, CCC and other charitable organizations and foundations. An international scientific - practical conference "The 21st century library: history, transformation, overcoming stereotypes" was held at the Library in May 2009. Another International scientific - practical conference “Library contribution to forming tolerant and highly spiritual society” took place in September 2010. Our Polish partners from Dolnoslaska public Library, Wroclaw, took part in these conferences held at a high professional level.

International cooperation contributes to local libraries development allowing them to benefit from modern development trends, to assess their activities, achievements and problems in a broader context in comparison with other libraries and also to align with international standards.

A recent project was the one-month exhibition 'Silhouettes of Latvia', dedicated to Latvia's Independence Day. Prior to the exhibition, Iris Araya and Gunta Ozola from the Central Library of Riga visited the library to share their work experience, leading to ongoing cooperation between the institutions.
