= Waffen-SS =

Military branch of the SS (1933–1945)

Armed SS
- Waffen-SS
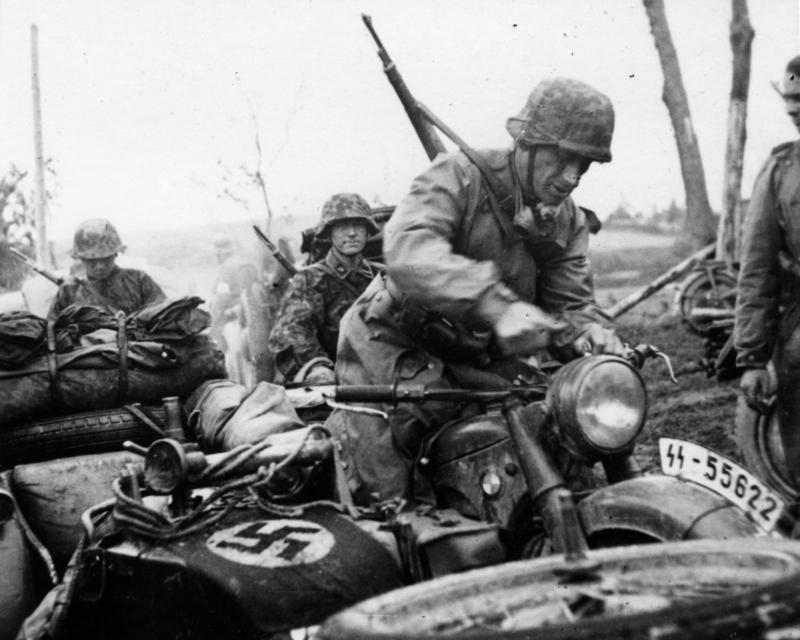
- Waffen-SS troops in the Soviet Union, 1941
- Founder: Sepp Dietrich
- Leader: Heinrich Himmler (Note: The Waffen-SS fell under the tactical command of the army in the field, though Himmler retained ultimate authority. Some prominent Waffen-SS field commanders included: Sepp Dietrich: Commanded the 1st SS Panzer Division "Leibstandarte SS Adolf Hitler" and the Sixth SS Panzer Army.; Paul Hausser: Led the II SS Panzer Corps and was a veteran of the Wehrmacht before joining the SS.; Theodor Eicke: The former commandant of the Dachau concentration camp who became commander of the 3rd SS Panzer Division "Totenkopf".)
- Founded: 17 March 1933; 93 years ago
- Dissolved: 10 May 1945; 81 years ago
- Country: Nazi Germany
- Allegiance: Adolf Hitler
- Headquarters: SS Führungshauptamt, Berlin
- Active regions: German-occupied Europe
- Size: 900,000 (peak 1944 est.)
- Part of: Schutzstaffel

The Waffen-SS (German: [ˈvafn̩ʔɛsˌʔɛs]; lit. 'Armed SS') was the combat branch of the Nazi Party's paramilitary Schutzstaffel (SS) organisation. Its formations included men from Nazi Germany, along with volunteers and conscripts from both German-occupied Europe and unoccupied lands. With the start of World War II, tactical control was exercised by the Oberkommando der Wehrmacht (OKW, "High Command of the Armed Forces"), with some units being subordinated to the Kommandostab Reichsführer-SS (lit. 'Command Staff Reich Leader-SS') directly under Reichsführer-SS Heinrich Himmler's control. It was disbanded in May 1945.

The Waffen-SS grew from three regiments to over 38 divisions during World War II. Combining combat and police functions, it served alongside the German Army (Heer), Ordnungspolizei (Order Police), and other security units. Originally, it was under the control of the SS Führungshauptamt (SS operational command office) beneath Himmler.

Initially, in keeping with the racial policy of Nazi Germany, membership was open only to people of Germanic origin (so-called "Aryan ancestry"). The rules were partially relaxed in 1940, and after the invasion of the Soviet Union in June 1941, Nazi propaganda claimed that the war was a "European crusade against Bolshevism" and subsequently units consisting largely or solely of foreign volunteers and conscripts were also raised. These Waffen-SS units were made up of men mainly from among the nationals of Nazi-occupied Europe. Despite relaxation of the rules, the Waffen-SS was still based on the racist ideology of Nazism, and ethnic Poles (who were viewed as subhumans) were specifically barred from the formations.

The Waffen-SS was involved in numerous atrocities. As an "integral part" of the SS, it was declared a criminal organisation by the International Military Tribunal in Nuremberg in 1946, due to its involvement in the Holocaust, the Porajmos, and numerous war crimes, including executions of prisoners of war and mass killing of civilians, often carried out during anti-partisan operations. Therefore Waffen-SS members, with the exception of conscripts, who comprised about one-third of the membership, were denied many of the rights afforded to military veterans.

== Origins (1929–39) ==
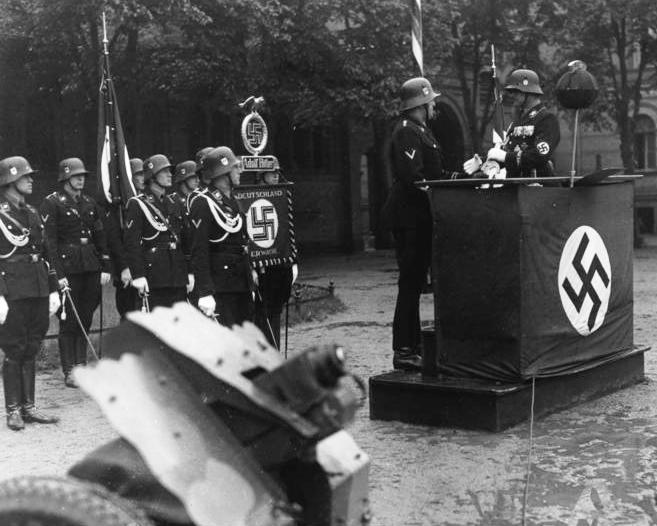
Parade for the third anniversary of the LSSAH on the barracks' grounds with Sepp Dietrich at the lectern, May 1935

The origins of the Waffen-SS can be traced back to the selection of a group of 120 SS men on 17 March 1933 by Sepp Dietrich to form the Sonderkommando Berlin. By November 1933, the formation had 800 men, and at a commemorative ceremony in Munich for the tenth anniversary of the failed Beer Hall Putsch the regiment swore allegiance to Adolf Hitler. The oaths pledged were "Pledging loyalty to him alone" and "Obedience unto death". The formation was given the title Leibstandarte (transl. Bodyguard Regiment) Adolf Hitler (LAH). On 13 April 1934, by order of Himmler, the regiment became known as the Leibstandarte SS Adolf Hitler (LSSAH).

The Leibstandarte demonstrated their loyalty to Hitler in 1934 during the "Night of the Long Knives", when the Nazi regime carried out a series of political murders and the purge of the Sturmabteilung (SA). Led by one of Hitler's oldest comrades, Ernst Röhm, the SA was seen as a threat by Hitler to his newly gained political power. Hitler also wanted to appease leaders of the Reichswehr (the Weimar Republic's armed forces) and conservatives of the country, people whose support Hitler needed to solidify his position. When Hitler decided to act against the SA, the SS was put in charge of killing Röhm and the other high-ranking SA officers. The Night of the Long Knives occurred between 30 June and 2 July 1934, claiming up to 200 victims and murdering almost the entire SA leadership, effectively ending its power. This action was largely carried out by SS personnel (including the Leibstandarte) and the Gestapo.

In September 1934, Hitler authorised the formation of the paramilitary wing of the Nazi Party and approved the formation of the SS-Verfügungstruppe (SS-VT), a special service troop under Hitler's overall command. The SS-VT had to depend on the German Army for its supply of weapons and military training, and its local draft boards responsible for assigning conscripts to the different branches of the Wehrmacht to meet quotas set by the German High Command (Oberkommando der Wehrmacht or OKW in German); the SS was given the lowest priority for recruits.

Even with the difficulties presented by the quota system, Heinrich Himmler formed two new SS regiments, the SS Germania and SS Deutschland, which together with the Leibstandarte and a communications unit made up the SS-VT. At the same time Himmler established two SS-Junker Schools (SS officer training camps) that, under the direction of former Lieutenant General Paul Hausser, prepared future SS leaders. In addition to military training, the courses aimed to instill a proper ideological worldview, with antisemitism being the main tenet. Instructors such as Matthias Kleinheisterkamp, or future war criminals, such as Franz Magill of the notorious SS Cavalry Brigade were of questionable competence.

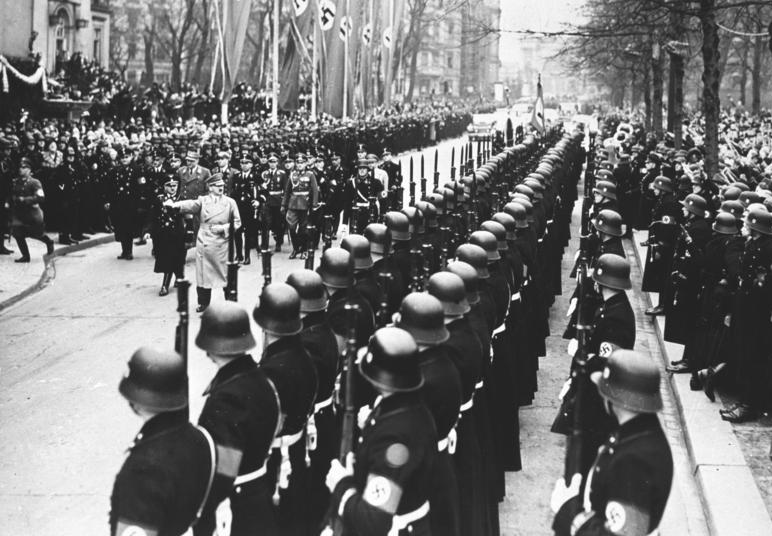
The Leibstandarte SS Adolf Hitler on parade in Berlin, 1938

In 1934, Himmler set stringent requirements for recruits. They were to be German nationals who could prove their Aryan ancestry back to 1800, unmarried, and without a criminal record. A four-year commitment was required for the SS-VT and LSSAH. Recruits had to be between the ages of 17 and 23, at least 1.74 metres (5 ft 9 in) tall (1.78 metres (5 ft 10 in) for the LSSAH). Concentration camp guards had to make a one-year commitment, be between the ages of 16 and 23, and at least 1.72 metres (5 ft 8 in) tall. All recruits were required to have 20/20 eyesight, no dental fillings, and to provide a medical certificate. By 1938, the height restrictions were relaxed, up to six dental fillings were permitted, and eyeglasses for astigmatism and mild vision correction were allowed. Once the war commenced, the physical requirements were no longer strictly enforced, and any recruit who could pass a basic medical exam was considered for service. Members of the SS could be of any religion except Judaism, but atheists were not allowed according to Himmler in 1937. Hitler expounded on the attitude he wanted during a talk in the Wolf's Lair: "I have six divisions of SS composed of men absolutely indifferent in matters of religion. It doesn't prevent them from going to their deaths with serenity in their souls."

Historian Bernd Wegner found in his study of officers that a large majority of the senior officers corps of the Waffen-SS were from an upper-middle-class background and would have been considered for commissioning by traditional standards. Among later Waffen-SS generals, approximately six out of ten had a "university entrance qualification (Abitur), and no less than one-fifth a university degree".

Hausser became the Inspector of the SS-VT in 1936. In this role, Hausser was in charge of the troops' military and ideological training but did not have command authority. The decision on deployment of the troops remained in Himmler's hands. This aligned with Hitler's intentions to maintain these troops exclusively at his disposal, "neither [a part] of the army, nor of the police", according to Hitler's order of 17 August 1938.

On 17 August 1938, Hitler declared that the SS-VT would have a role in domestic as well as foreign affairs, which transformed this growing armed force into the rival that the army had feared. He decreed that service in the SS-VT qualified to fulfill military service obligations, although service in the SS-Totenkopfverbände (SS-TV) would not. Some units of the SS-TV would, in the case of war, be used as reserves for the SS-VT, which did not have its own reserves. For all its training, the SS-VT was untested in combat. In 1938, a battalion of the Leibstandarte was chosen to accompany the army troops in occupying Austria during the Anschluss, and the three regiments of the SS-VT participated in the occupation of the Sudetenland that same year in October. In both actions no resistance was met.

Recruiting ethnic Germans from other countries began in April 1940, and units consisting of non-Germanic recruits were formed beginning in 1942. Non-Germanic units were not considered to be part of the SS, which still maintained its racial criteria, but rather were considered to be foreign nationals serving under the command of the SS. As a general rule, an "SS Division" was made up of Germans or other Germanic peoples, while a "Division of the SS" was made up of non-Germanic volunteers and conscripts.

== World War II ==
=== 1939 ===
==== Invasion of Poland ====
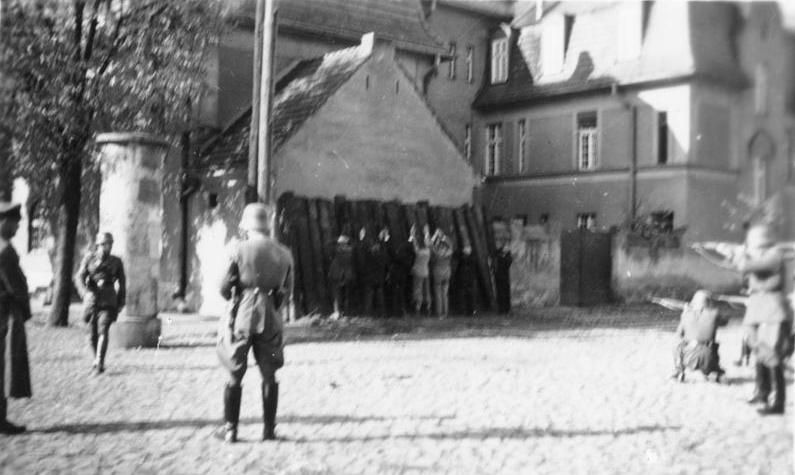
Members of the Einsatzgruppen murdering Polish civilians in Kórnik shortly after the outbreak of World War II in Europe

Himmler's military formations at the outbreak of the war comprised several subgroups that would become the basis of the Waffen-SS:

- The Leibstandarte SS Adolf Hitler (LSSAH), under then SS-Obergruppenführer (Note: Equivalent to a full general. The independence of the LSSAH can be partly explained by Dietrich's rank, as well as his personal friendship with Hitler.) Josef "Sepp" Dietrich
- The Inspectorate of Verfügungstruppe (SS-VT), under then SS-Gruppenführer Paul Hausser, which commanded the Deutschland, Germania and Der Führer regiments. The latter was recruited in Austria after the Anschluss and was not yet combat-ready.
- The Inspectorate of Concentration Camps, under SS-Gruppenführer Theodor Eicke, which fielded four infantry and one cavalry Death's Head Standarten, comprising camp guards of the SS-Totenkopfverbände (SS-TV). These troops wore the SS-TV skull and crossbones rather than the SS-VT "SS" runes.
- Police units of Obergruppenführer und General der Polizei Kurt Daluege's Ordnungspolizei, which reported to Himmler in his capacity as Chief of German Police. These troops used police ranks and insignia rather than those of the SS.

In August 1939, Hitler placed the Leibstandarte and the SS-VT under the operational control of the Army High Command (OKH). Himmler retained command of the Totenkopfstandarten for employment behind the advancing combat units in what were euphemistically called "special tasks of a police nature".

In spite of the swift military victory over Poland in September 1939, the regular army felt that the performance of the SS-VT left much to be desired; its units took unnecessary risks and had a higher casualty rate than the army. They also stated that the SS-VT was poorly trained and its officers unsuitable for combat command. As an example, the OKW noted that the Leibstandarte had to be rescued by an army regiment after becoming surrounded by the Poles at Pabianice. In its defence, the SS insisted that it had been hampered by having to fight piecemeal instead of as one formation, and was improperly equipped by the army to carry out its objectives. Himmler insisted that the SS-VT should be allowed to fight in its own formations under its own commanders, while the OKW tried to have the SS-VT disbanded altogether. Hitler was unwilling to upset either the army or Himmler, and chose a third path. He ordered that the SS-VT form its own divisions but that the divisions would be under army command. Hitler resisted integrating the Waffen-SS into the army, as it was intended to remain the armed wing of the party and to become an elite police force once the war was won.

During the invasion, numerous war crimes were committed against the Polish people. The Leibstandarte became notorious for torching villages without military justification. Members of the Leibstandarte also committed atrocities in numerous towns, including the murder of 50 Polish Jews in Błonie and the massacre of 200 civilians, including children, who were machine gunned in Złoczew. Shootings also took place in Bolesławiec, Torzeniec, Goworowo, Mława, and Włocławek. Eicke's SS-TV field forces were not military.

Their military capabilities were employed instead in terrorizing the civilian population through acts that included hunting down straggling Polish soldiers, confiscating agricultural produce and livestock, and torturing and murdering large numbers of Polish political leaders, aristocrats, businessmen, priests, intellectuals, and Jews.

His Totenkopfverbände troops were called on to carry out "police and security measures" in the rear areas. What these measures involved is demonstrated by the record of SS Totenkopf Standarte "Brandenburg". It arrived in Włocławek on 22 September 1939 and embarked on a four-day "Jewish action" that included the burning of synagogues and the execution en-masse of the leaders of the Jewish community. On 29 September the Standarte travelled to Bydgoszcz to conduct an "intelligentsia action".

==== First divisions ====
In October 1939, the Deutschland, Germania, and Der Führer regiments were reorganised into the SS-Verfügungs-Division. The Leibstandarte remained independent and was increased in strength to a reinforced motorised regiment. Hitler authorised the creation of two new divisions: the SS Totenkopf Division, formed from militarised Standarten of the SS-Totenkopfverbände, and the Polizei Division, formed from members of the national police force. Almost overnight the force that the OKW had tried to disband had increased from 18,000 to over 100,000 men. Hitler next authorised the creation of four motorised artillery battalions in March 1940, one for each division and the Leibstandarte. The OKW was supposed to supply these new battalions with artillery, but was reluctant to hand over guns from its own arsenal. The weapons arrived only slowly and, by the time of the Battle of France, only the Leibstandarte battalion was up to strength.

=== 1940 ===
==== France and the Netherlands ====
The three SS divisions and the Leibstandarte spent the winter of 1939 and the spring of 1940 training and preparing for the coming war in the west. In May, they moved to the front, and the Leibstandarte was attached to the army's 227th Infantry Division. The Der Führer Regiment was detached from the SS-VT Division and attached to the 207th Infantry Division. The SS-VT Division minus Der Führer was concentrated near Münster awaiting the invasion of the Netherlands. The SS Totenkopf and Polizei Divisions were held in reserve.

On 10 May, the Leibstandarte overcame Dutch border guards to spearhead the German advance of X Corps into the Netherlands, north of the rivers towards the Dutch Grebbe Line and subsequently the Amsterdam region. The neighbouring Der Führer Regiment advanced towards the Grebbe Line in the sector of the Grebbeberg with as a follow-up objective the city of Utrecht. The Battle of the Grebbeberg lasted three days and took a toll on Der Führer. On 11 May, the SS-VT Division crossed into the Netherlands south of the rivers and headed towards Breda. It fought a series of skirmishes before Germania advanced into the Dutch province of Zeeland on 14 May. The rest of the SS-VT Division joined the northern front against the forces in Antwerp. On the same day, the Leibstandarte entered Rotterdam. After the surrender of Rotterdam, the Leibstandarte left for The Hague, which they reached on 15 May, capturing 3,500 Dutch soldiers as prisoners of war.

In France, the SS Totenkopf Division was involved in the only Allied tank counterattack in the Battle of France. On 21 May, units of the 1st Army Tank Brigade, supported by the 50th (Northumbrian) Infantry Division, took part in the Battle of Arras. The SS Totenkopf, on the southern flank of the 7th Panzer Division, was overrun, finding their standard anti-tank gun, the 3.7 cm PaK 36, was no match for the British Matilda II tank.

After the Dutch surrender, the Leibstandarte moved south to France on 24 May. Becoming part of the XIX Panzer Corps under the command of General Heinz Guderian, they took up a position 15 miles south west of Dunkirk along the line of the Aa Canal, facing the Allied defensive line near Watten. A patrol from the SS-VT Division crossed the canal at Saint-Venant, but was destroyed by British armour. A larger force from the SS-VT Division then crossed the canal and formed a bridgehead at Saint-Venant; 30 miles from Dunkirk. That night the OKW ordered the advance to halt, with the British Expeditionary Force trapped. The Leibstandarte paused for the night. However, on the following day, in defiance of Hitler's orders, Dietrich ordered his 3rd Battalion to cross the canal and take the heights beyond, where British artillery observers were putting the regiment at risk. They assaulted the heights and drove the observers off. Instead of being censured for his act of defiance, Dietrich was awarded the Knight's Cross of the Iron Cross. On that same day, British forces attacked Saint-Venant, forcing the SS-VT Division to retreat.

On 26 May, the German advance resumed. On 27 May, the Deutschland Regiment of the SS-VT Division reached the Allied defensive line on the Leie River at Merville. They forced a bridgehead across the river and waited for the SS Totenkopf Division to arrive to cover their flank. What arrived first was a unit of British tanks, which penetrated their position. The SS-VT managed to hold on against the British tank force, which got to within 15 ft (4.6 m) of commander Felix Steiner's position. Only the arrival of the Totenkopf Panzerjäger platoon saved the Deutschland Regiment from being destroyed and their bridgehead lost.

That same day, as the SS Totenkopf Division advanced near Merville, they encountered stubborn resistance from British Army units, which slowed their advance. The SS Totenkopf 4 Company, then committed the Le Paradis massacre, where 97 captured men of the 2nd Battalion, Royal Norfolk Regiment were machine gunned after surrendering, with survivors finished off with bayonets. Only two men survived.

By 28 May, the Leibstandarte had taken the village of Wormhout, only ten miles from Dunkirk. After their surrender, soldiers from the 2nd Battalion, Royal Warwickshire Regiment, along with some other units (including French soldiers), were taken to a barn in La Plaine au Bois near Wormhout and Esquelbecq. It was there that troops of the Leibstandarte's 2nd Battalion committed the Wormhoudt massacre, where 81 British and French prisoners of war were murdered.

By 30 May, the British were cornered at Dunkirk, and the SS divisions continued the advance into France. The Leibstandarte reached Saint-Étienne, 250 miles south of Paris, and had advanced further into France than any other unit. By the next day, the fighting was all but over. German forces arrived in Paris unopposed on 14 June and France formally surrendered on 25 June. Hitler expressed his pleasure with the performance of the Leibstandarte in the Netherlands and France, telling them, "Henceforth it will be an honour for you, who bear my name, to lead every German attack."

==== 1940 expansion and naming ====
Recruitment poster

On 19 July 1940, Hitler gave a speech to the Reichstag, where he gave a summary of the western campaign and praised the German forces involved. He used the term "Waffen-SS" when describing the units of the LSSAH and SS-VT that took part. From that day forward, the term Waffen-SS became the official designation for the SS combat formations. Himmler gained approval for the Waffen-SS to form its own high command, the Kommandoamt der Waffen-SS within the SS Führungshauptamt, which was created in August 1940. It received command of the SS-VT (the Leibstandarte and the Verfügungs-Division, renamed Reich) and the armed SS-TV regiments (the Totenkopf Division together with several independent Totenkopf-Standarten).

In 1940, SS chief of staff Gottlob Berger approached Himmler with a plan to recruit volunteers in the conquered territories from the ethnic German and Germanic populations. At first, Hitler had doubts about recruiting foreigners, but he was persuaded by Himmler and Berger. He gave approval for a new division to be formed from foreign nationals with German officers. By June 1940, Danish and Norwegian volunteers had formed the SS Regiment Nordland, with Dutch and Flemish volunteers forming the SS Regiment Westland. The two regiments, together with Germania (transferred from the Reich Division), formed the SS Division Wiking. A sufficient number of volunteers came forward requiring the SS to open a new training camp just for foreign volunteers at Sennheim in Alsace-Lorraine.

=== 1941 ===
At the beginning of the new year, the Polizei Division was brought under FHA administration, although it would not be formally merged into the Waffen-SS until 1942. At the same time, the Totenkopf-Standarten, aside from the three constituting the TK-Division, lost their Death's Head designation and insignia and were reclassified SS-Infanterie- (or Kavallerie-) Regimente. The 11th Regiment was transferred into the Reich Division to replace Germania; the remainder were grouped into three independent brigades and a battle group in Norway.

By spring of 1941, the Waffen-SS consisted of the equivalent of six or seven divisions: the Reich, Totenkopf, Polizei, and Wiking Divisions and Kampfgruppe (later Division) Nord, the Leibstandarte, the 1st SS Infantry, 2nd SS Infantry and SS Cavalry Brigades.

==== Balkans ====
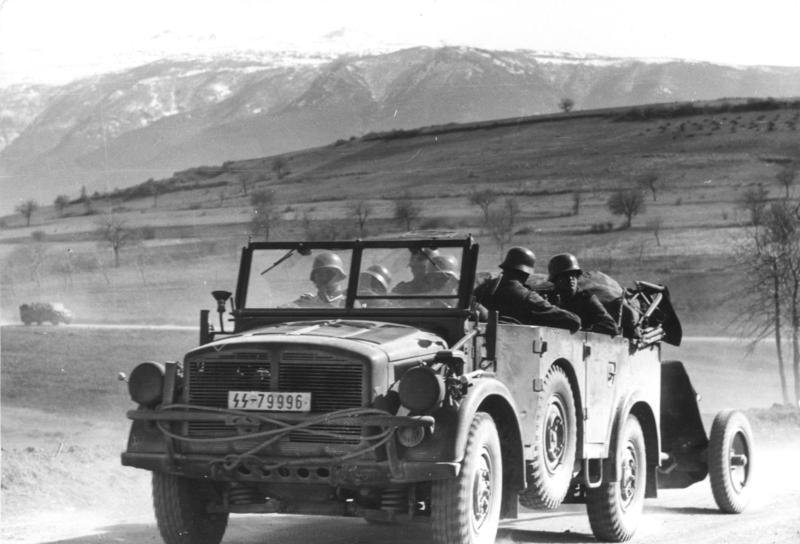
Troops of the Leibstandarte SS Adolf Hitler Division advancing into the Balkans, 1941

In March 1941, a major Italian counterattack against Greek forces failed, and Germany came to the aid of its ally. Operation Marita began on 6 April 1941, with German troops invading Greece through Bulgaria and Yugoslavia in an effort to secure its southern flank.

Reich was ordered to leave France and head for Romania, and the Leibstandarte was ordered to Bulgaria. The Leibstandarte, attached to the XL Panzer Corps, advanced west then south from Bulgaria into the mountains, and by 9 April had reached Prilep in Yugoslavia, 30 miles from the Greek border. Further north the Reich Division, with the XLI Panzer Corps, crossed the Romanian border and advanced on Belgrade, the Yugoslav capital. Fritz Klingenberg, a company commander in the Reich, led his men into Belgrade, where a small group in the vanguard accepted the surrender of the city on 13 April. A few days later the Royal Yugoslav Army surrendered.

The Leibstandarte had now crossed into Greece, and on 10 April engaged the 6th Australian Division in the Battle of the Klidi Pass. For 48 hours they fought for control of the heights, often engaging in hand-to-hand combat, eventually gaining control with the capture of Height 997, which opened the pass and allowed the German Army to advance into the Greek interior. This victory gained praise from the OKW: in the order of the day they were commended for their "unshakable offensive spirit" and told that "the present victory signifies for the Leibstandarte a new and imperishable page of honour in its history."

The Leibstandarte continued the advance on 13 May. When the Reconnaissance Battalion under the command of Kurt Meyer came under heavy fire from the Greek Army defending the Klisura Pass, they broke through the defenders and captured 1,000 prisoners of war at the cost of only six dead and nine wounded. The next day, Meyer captured Kastoria and took another 11,000 prisoners of war. By 20 May, the Leibstandarte had cut off the retreating Greek Army at Metsovo and accepted the surrender of the Greek Epirus-Macedonian Army. As a reward, the Leibstandarte was nominally redesignated as a full motorised division, although few additional elements had been added by the start of the Soviet campaign and the "division" remained effectively a reinforced brigade.

==== Soviet Union ====
Operation Barbarossa, the German invasion of the Soviet Union, started on 22 June 1941, and all the Waffen-SS formations participated (including the Reich Division, which was formally renamed to Das Reich by the fall of 1941).

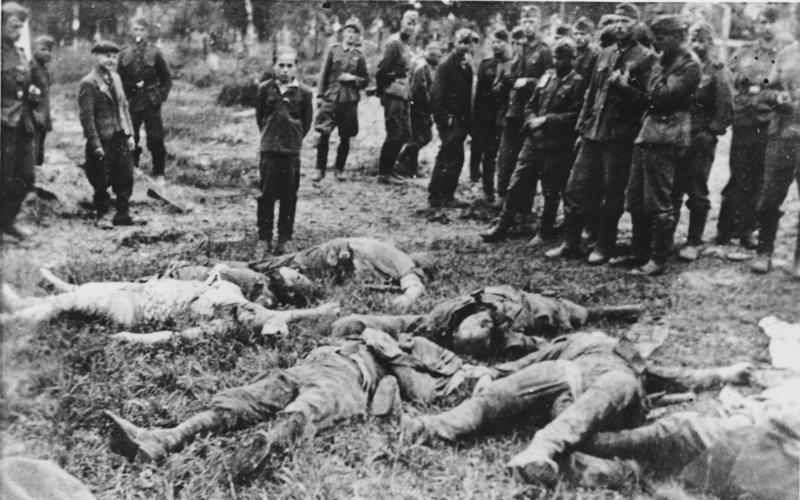
Einsatzgruppen members at a murder site of Jews in the village of Zboriv, Ukraine, 1941

SS Division Nord, which was in northern Finland, took part in Operation Arctic Fox with the Finnish Army and fought at the battle of Salla, where against strong Soviet forces they suffered 300 killed and 400 wounded in the first two days of the invasion. Thick forests and heavy smoke from forest fires disoriented the troops and the division's units completely fell apart. By the end of 1941, Nord had suffered severe casualties. Over the winter of 1941–42 it received replacements from the general pool of Waffen-SS recruits, who were supposedly younger and better trained than the SS men of the original formation, which had been drawn largely from Totenkopfstandarten of Nazi concentration camp guards.

The rest of the Waffen-SS divisions and brigades fared better. The Totenkopf and Polizei divisions were attached to Army Group North, with the mission to advance through the Baltic states and on to Leningrad. The Das Reich Division was with Army Group Centre and headed towards Moscow. The Leibstandarte and Wiking Divisions were with Army Group South, heading for Ukraine and the city of Kiev.

The invasion of the Soviet Union proceeded well at first, but the cost to the Waffen-SS was extreme: by late October, the Leibstandarte was at half strength due to enemy action and dysentery that swept through the ranks. Das Reich lost 60% of its strength and was still to take part in the Battle of Moscow. The unit was later decimated in the following Soviet offensive. The Der Führer Regiment was reduced to 35 men out of the 2,000 that had started the campaign in June. Altogether, the Waffen-SS had suffered 43,000 casualties.

While the Leibstandarte and the SS divisions were fighting in the front line, behind the lines it was a different story. The 1st SS Infantry and 2nd SS Infantry Brigades, which had been formed from surplus concentration camp guards of the SS-TV, and the SS Cavalry Brigade moved into the Soviet Union behind the advancing armies. At first, they fought Soviet partisans and cut off units of the Red Army in the rear of Army Group South, capturing 7,000 prisoners of war, but from mid-August 1941 until late 1942 they were assigned to the Reich Security Main Office headed by Reinhard Heydrich. The brigades were now used for rear area security and policing, and were no longer under army or Waffen-SS command. In the autumn of 1941, they left the anti-partisan role to other units and actively took part in the Holocaust. While assisting the Einsatzgruppen, they participated in the extermination of the Jewish population of the Soviet Union, forming firing parties when required. The three brigades were responsible for the murder of tens of thousands by the end of 1941.

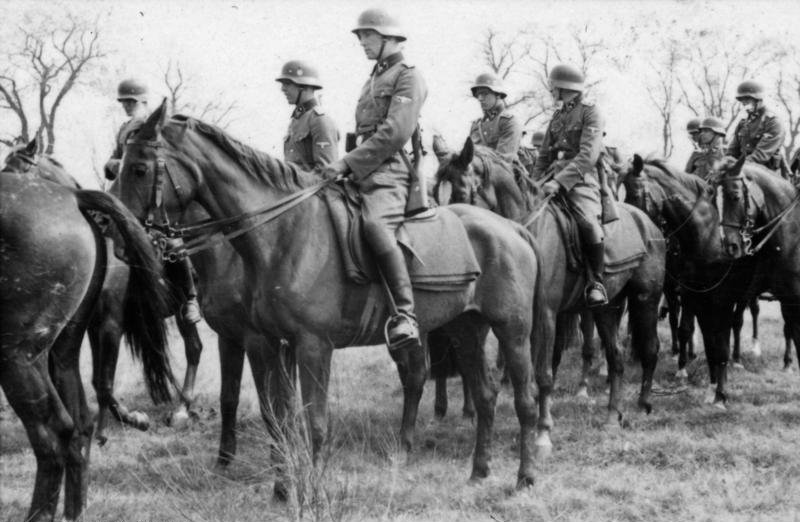
Cavalrymen of the SS Cavalry Brigade, September 1941

Because it was more mobile and better able to carry out large-scale operations, the SS Cavalry Brigade had 2 regiments with a strength of 3500 men and played a pivotal role in the transition to the wholesale extermination of the Jewish population. In the summer of 1941, Himmler assigned Hermann Fegelein to be in charge of both regiments. On 19 July 1941, Himmler assigned Fegelein's regiments to the general command of HSSPF Erich von dem Bach-Zelewski for the "systematic combing" of the Pripyat swamps, an operation designed to round up and exterminate Jews, partisans, and civilians in that area of the Byelorussian SSR.

Fegelein split the territory to be covered into two sections divided by the Pripyat River, with the 1st Regiment taking the northern half and the 2nd Regiment the south. The regiments worked their way from east to west through their assigned territory, and filed daily reports on the number of people killed and taken prisoner. By 1 August, 1st SS Cavalry Regiment under the command of Gustav Lombard was responsible for the death of 800 people; by 6 August, this total had reached 3,000 "Jews and partisans". Throughout the following weeks, the regiment's personnel under Lombard's command murdered an estimated 11,000 Jews and more than 400 dispersed soldiers of the Red Army. Thus Fegelein's units were among the first in the Holocaust to wipe out entire Jewish communities. Fegelein's final operational report dated 18 September 1941, states that they killed 14,178 Jews, 1,001 partisans, 699 Red Army soldiers, with 830 prisoners taken and losses of 17 dead, 36 wounded, and 3 missing. Historian Henning Pieper estimates the actual number of Jews killed was closer to 23,700.

=== 1942 ===
==== 1942 expansion ====
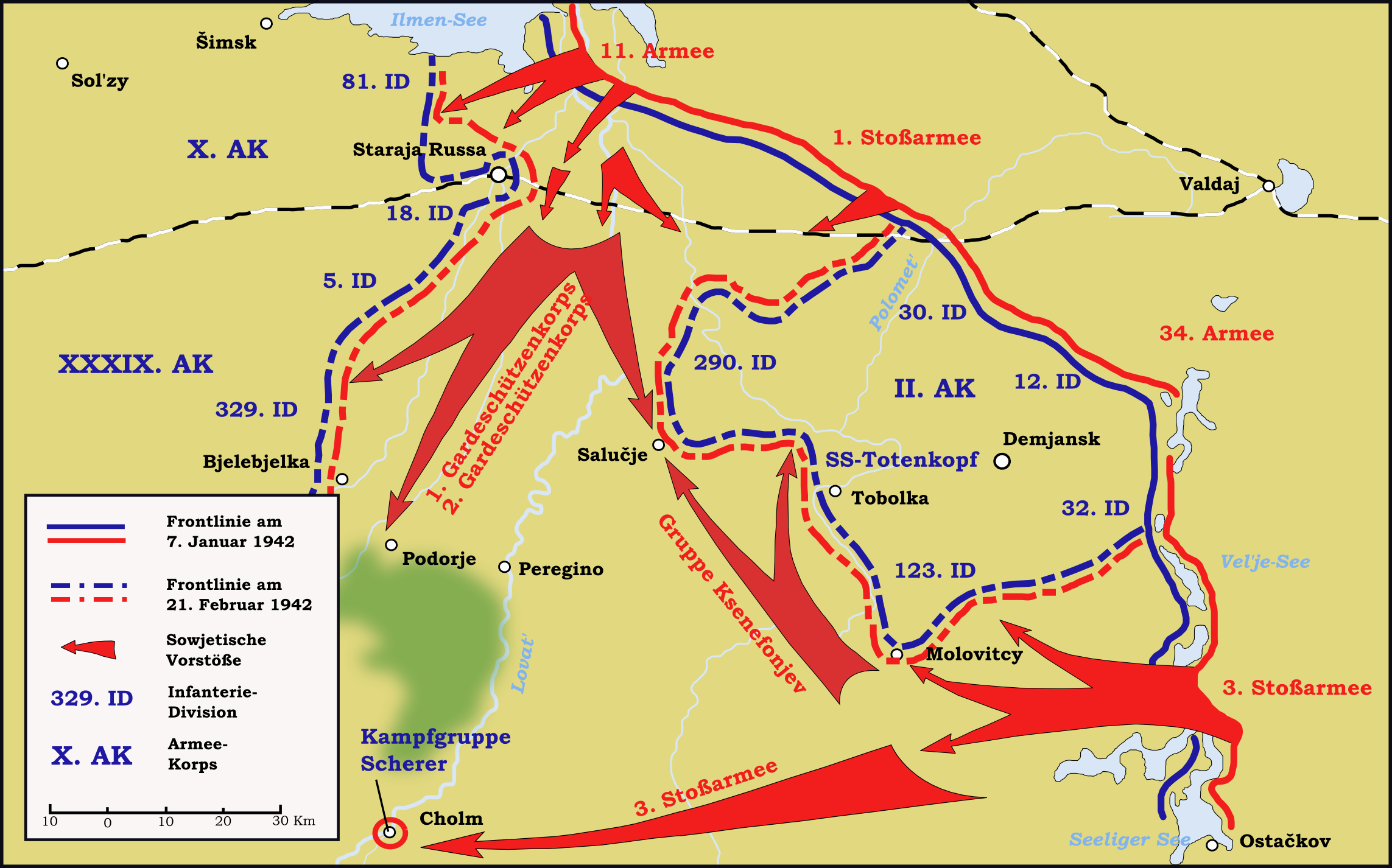
Offensive of the Red Army south of Lake Ilmen, 7 January – 21 February 1942, which created the Demyansk Pocket

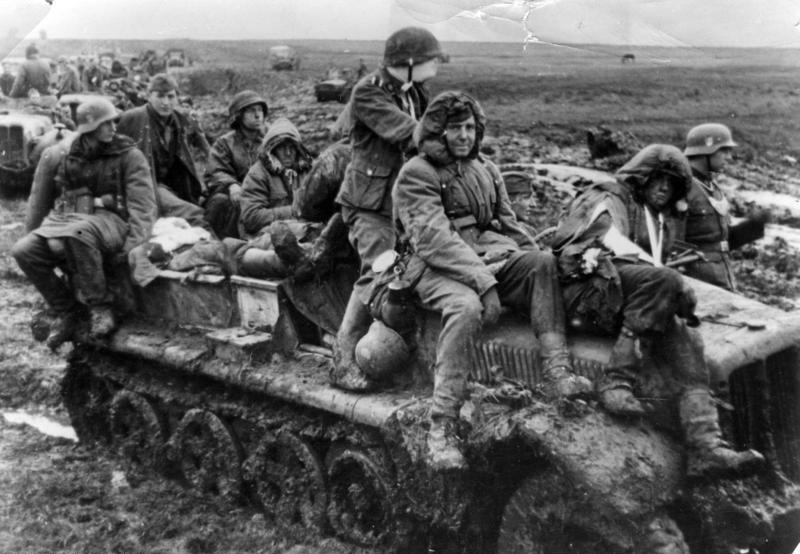
Troops of the 3rd SS Division on the Eastern Front, 1942

In 1942, the Waffen-SS was further expanded and a new division was entered on the rolls in March. By the second half of 1942, an increasing number of foreigners, many of whom were not volunteers, began entering the ranks. The 7th SS Volunteer Mountain Division Prinz Eugen was recruited from Volksdeutsche (ethnic Germans) drafted under threat of punishment by the local German leadership from Croatia, Serbia, Hungary, and Romania and used for anti-partisan operations in the Balkans. Himmler approved the introduction of formal compulsory service for the Volksdeutsche in German-occupied Serbia. Another new division was formed at the same time, when the SS Cavalry Brigade was used as the cadre in the formation of the 8th SS Cavalry Division Florian Geyer.

==== Panzergrenadier divisions ====
The front line divisions of the Waffen-SS that had suffered losses through the winter of 1941–1942 and during the Soviet counter-offensive were withdrawn to France to recover and be reformed as Panzergrenadier divisions. Due to the efforts of Himmler and Hausser, the new commander of the SS Panzer Corps, the three SS Panzergrenadier divisions Leibstandarte, Das Reich, and Totenkopf were to be formed with a full regiment of tanks rather than only a battalion. This meant that the SS Panzergrenadier divisions were full-strength Panzer divisions in all but name. They each received nine Tiger tanks, which were formed into the heavy panzer companies.

==== Demyansk Pocket ====
The Soviet offensive of January 1942 trapped a number of German divisions in the Demyansk Pocket between February and April 1942; the 3rd SS Totenkopf Division was one of the divisions encircled by the Red Army. The Red Army liberated Demyansk on 1 March 1943 with the retreat of German troops. "For his excellence in command and the particularly fierce fighting of the Totenkopf", Eicke was awarded Oak Leaves to the Knight's Cross on 20 May 1942.

=== 1943 ===
==== 1943 expansion ====
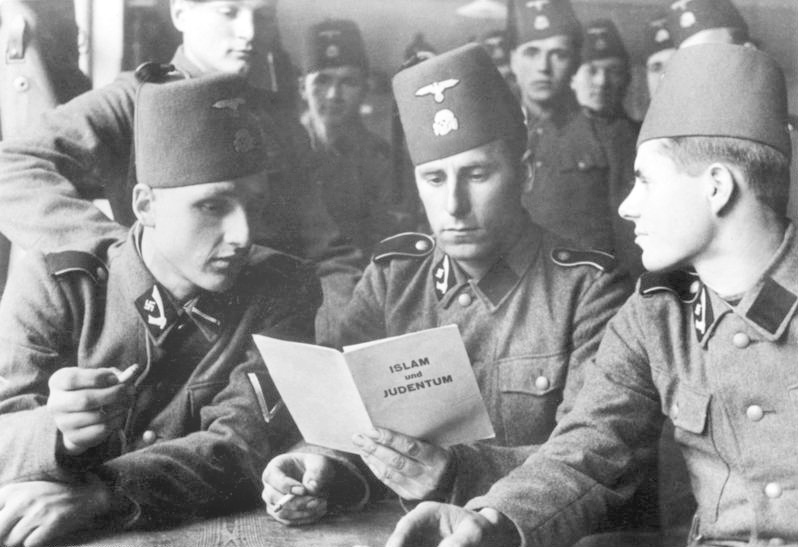
Bosnian Muslims (ethnic Bosniaks), members of the Handschar Division, the first non-Germanic, multi-ethnic Waffen-SS division reading a pamphlet entitled Islam and Judaism in 1943

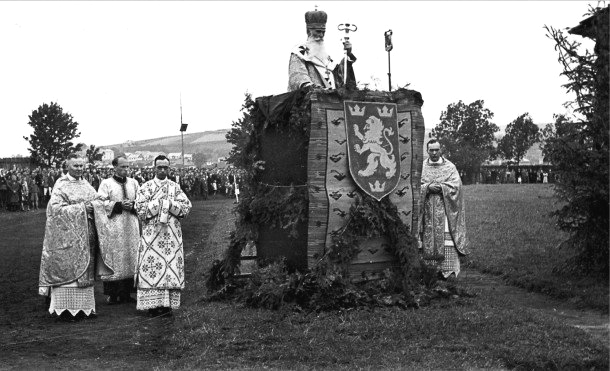
Uniate Catholic Bishop Joseph Iosafat Kotsilovsky blesses the troops of the Galician Division

The Waffen-SS expanded further in 1943: in February the 9th SS Panzer Division Hohenstaufen and its sister division, the 10th SS Panzer Division Frundsberg, were formed in France. They were followed in July by the 11th SS Volunteer Panzergrenadier Division Nordland created from Norwegian and Danish volunteers. September saw the formation of the 12th SS Panzer Division Hitlerjugend using volunteers from the Hitler Youth. Himmler and Berger successfully appealed to Hitler to form a Bosnian Muslim division, and the 13th Waffen Mountain Division of the SS Handschar (1st Croatian), the first non-Germanic division, was formed, to fight Josip Broz Tito's Yugoslav Partisans. This was followed by the 14th Waffen Grenadier Division of the SS (1st Galician) formed from volunteers from Galicia in western Ukraine. The 15th Waffen Grenadier Division of the SS (1st Latvian) was created in 1943, using compulsory military service in the Ostland. The final new division of 1943 was the 16th SS Panzergrenadier Division Reichsführer-SS, which was created using the Sturmbrigade Reichsführer SS as a cadre. By the end of the year, the Waffen-SS had increased in size from eight divisions and some brigades to 16 divisions. By 1943 the Waffen-SS could no longer claim to be an "elite" fighting force. Recruitment and conscription based on "numerical over qualitative expansion" took place, with many of the "foreign" units being good for only rear-guard duty.

==== Kharkov ====
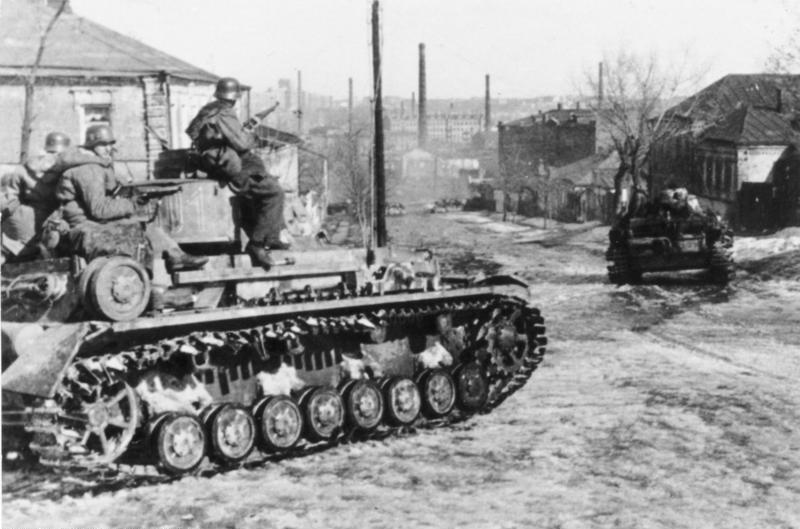
German tanks at Kharkov, 1943

On the Eastern Front, the Germans suffered a devastating defeat when the 6th Army was destroyed during the Battle of Stalingrad. Hitler ordered the SS Panzer Corps back to the Eastern Front for a counter-attack with the city of Kharkov as its objective. The SS Panzer Corps was in full retreat on 19 February, having been attacked by the Soviet 6th Army, when they received the order to counter-attack. Disobeying Hitler's order to "stand fast and fight to the death", Hausser withdrew in front of the Red Army. During Field Marshal Erich von Manstein's counteroffensive, the SS Panzer Corps, without support from the Luftwaffe or neighbouring German formations, broke through the Soviet line and advanced on Kharkov. Despite orders to encircle Kharkov from the north, the SS Panzer Corps directly attacked in the Third Battle of Kharkov on 11 March. This led to four days of house-to-house fighting before Kharkov was recaptured by the Leibstandarte Division on 15 March. Two days later, the Germans recaptured Belgorod, creating the salient that, in July 1943, led to the Battle of Kursk. The German offensive cost the Red Army an estimated 70,000 casualties but the house-to-house fighting in Kharkov was particularly bloody for the SS Panzer Corps, which lost approximately 44% of its strength by the time operations ended in late March.

==== Warsaw Ghetto uprising ====
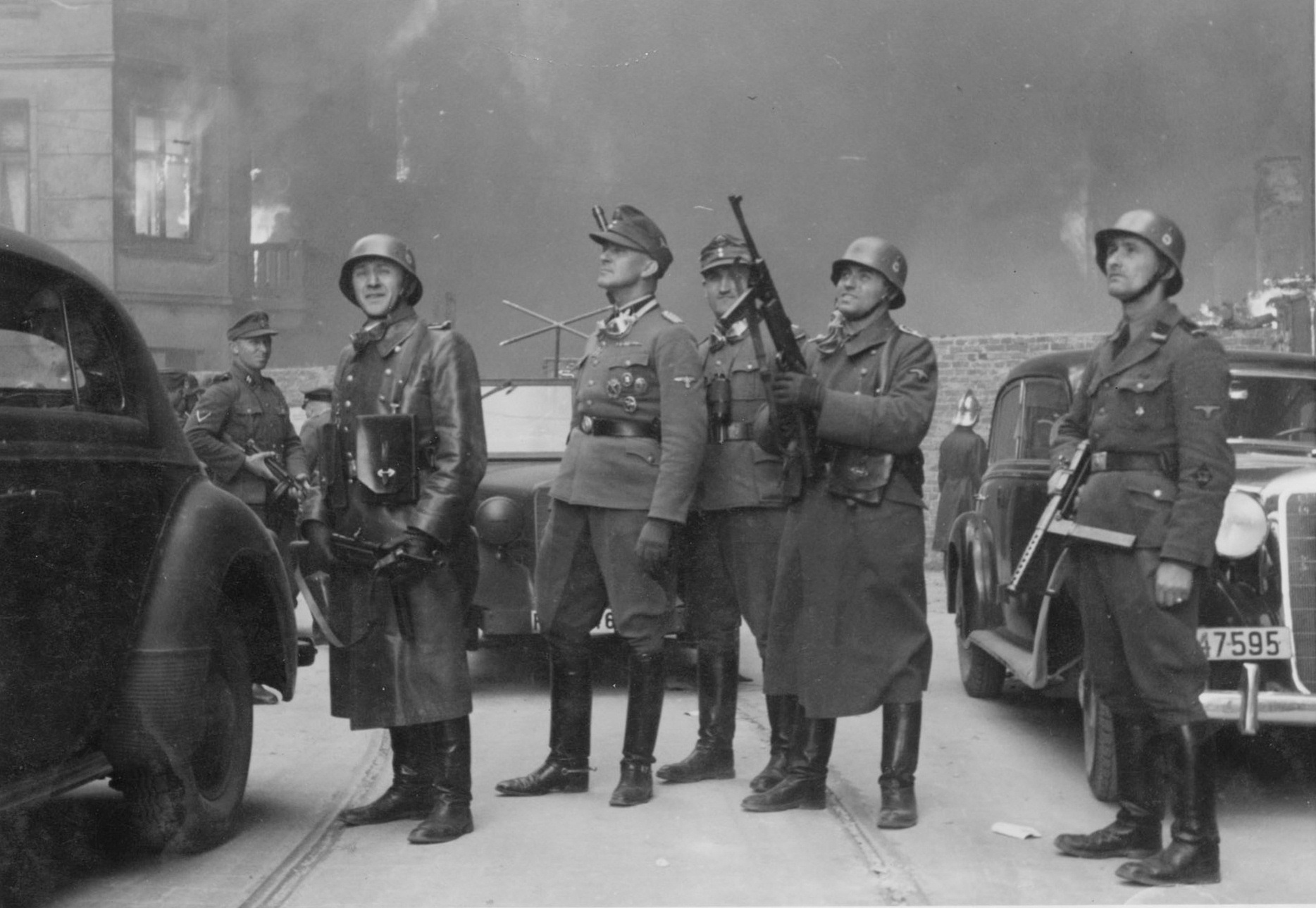
Original caption from the Stroop Report: "The leader of the grand operation." SS-Brigadeführer Jürgen Stroop (center) watches housing blocks burn.

The Warsaw Ghetto Uprising was a Jewish insurgency that arose within the Warsaw Ghetto from 19 April to 16 May, an effort to prevent the transportation of the remaining population of the ghetto to Treblinka extermination camp. Units involved from the Waffen-SS were 821 Waffen-SS Panzergrenadiers from five reserve and training battalions and one cavalry reserve and training battalion.

==== Kursk ====
For the Battle of Kursk, the SS Panzer Corps was renamed the II SS Panzer Corps and was part of the 4th Panzer Army. The II SS Panzer Corps spearheaded the attack through the Soviet defences. The attack penetrated to a depth of 35 kilometres (22 mi) and was then stopped by the Soviet 1st Tank Army.

The Soviet reserves had been sent south to defend against a German attack by the III Panzer Corps. With the loss of their reserves, any hope they may have had of dealing a major defeat to the II SS Panzer Corps ended. But the German advances now failed – despite appalling losses, the Soviet tank armies held the line and prevented the II SS Panzer Corps from making the expected breakthrough.

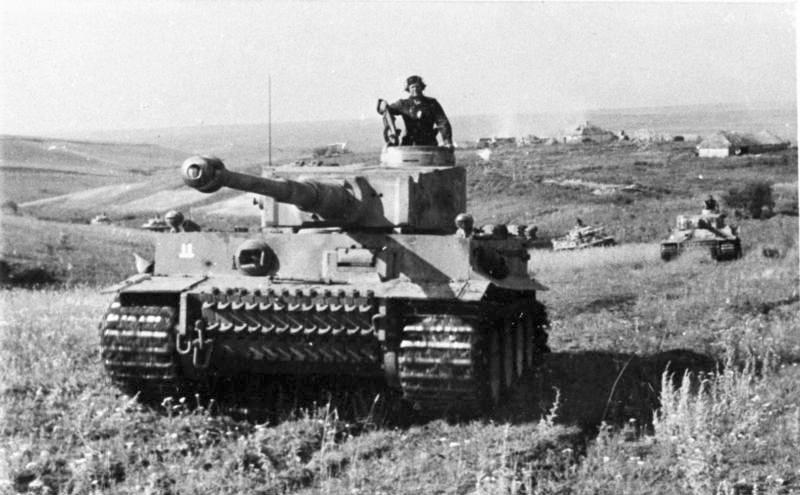
Tiger I tank company of the Das Reich division during the Battle of Kursk, July 1943

The failure to break through the Soviet tactical zone and the need to break off the assault by the German 9th Army on the northern shoulder of the Kursk salient due to Operation Kutuzov contributed to Hitler's decision to halt the offensive. A parallel attack by the Red Army against the new 6th Army on the Mius river south of Kharkov necessitated the withdrawal of reserve forces held to exploit any success on the southern shoulder of Kursk. The OKW also had to draw on some German troops from the Eastern Front to bolster the Mediterranean theatre following the Allied invasion of Sicily. On 17 July, Hitler called off the operation and ordered a withdrawal. The Soviet Union was not beaten, and the strategic initiative had swung to the Red Army. The Germans were forced onto the defensive as the Red Army began the liberation of Western Russia.

==== Italy ====
The Leibstandarte was thereafter sent to Italy to help stabilise the situation there following the disposal of Benito Mussolini by the Badoglio government and the Allied invasion of Sicily, which marked the beginning of the Italian campaign. The division left behind its armour and equipment, which was given to the Das Reich and Totenkopf Divisions. After the Italian surrender and collapse of 8 September 1943, the Leibstandarte was ordered to begin disarming nearby Italian units. It also had the task of guarding vital road and rail junctions in the north of Italy and was involved in several skirmishes with partisans. This went smoothly, with the exception of a brief skirmish with Italian troops stationed in Parma on 9 September. By 19 September, all Italian forces in the Po River plain had been disarmed, but the OKW received reports that elements of the Italian 4th Army were regrouping in Piedmont, near the French border. Joachim Peiper's mechanised 3rd Battalion, 2nd SS Panzergrenadier Regiment, was sent to disarm these units. On arriving in the province of Cuneo, Peiper was met by an Italian officer who warned that his forces would attack unless Peiper's unit vacated the province immediately. After Peiper refused, the Italians attacked. Peiper's battalion defeated the Italians, and subsequently shelled and burnt down the village of Boves, killing at least 34 civilians. Peiper's battalion then disarmed the remaining Italian forces in the area.

While the Leibstandarte was operating in the north, the 16th SS Reichsführer-SS Division sent a small battlegroup to contain the Anzio landings in January 1944. In March, the bulk of the 1st Italienische Freiwilligen Sturmbrigade (or Brigata d'Assalto, Volontari in Italian) was sent to the Anzio beachhead, where they fought alongside their German allies, receiving favourable reports and taking heavy losses. In recognition of their performance, Himmler declared the unit to be fully integrated into the Waffen-SS.

=== 1944 ===
==== 1944 expansion ====
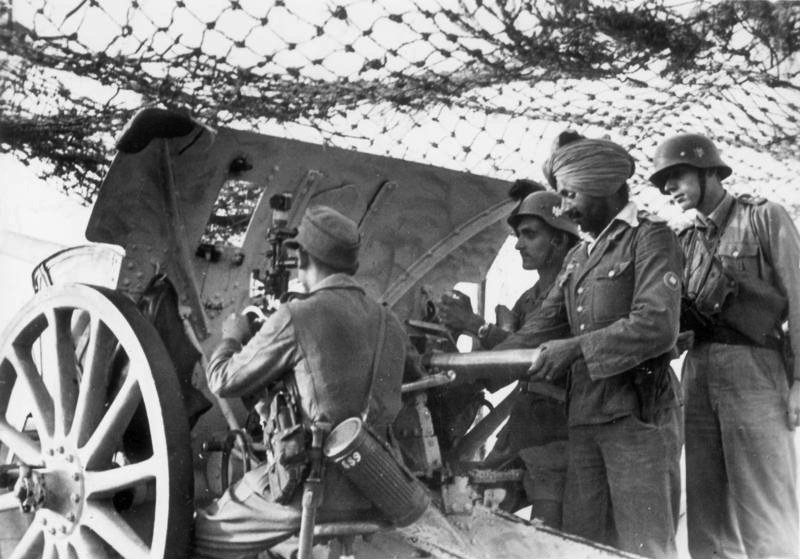
After D-Day, the Indian Legion was transferred from the Heer to the Waffen-SS.

The Waffen-SS expanded again during 1944. January saw the formation of the 19th Waffen Grenadier Division of the SS (2nd Latvian), formed from the two SS infantry brigades as cadre with Latvian conscripts. The 20th Waffen Grenadier Division of the SS (1st Estonian) was formed via general conscription in February 1944, around a cadre from the 3rd Estonian SS Volunteer Brigade. The 21st Waffen Mountain Division of the SS Skanderbeg (1st Albanian) was formed in March 1944 from Albanian and Kosovan volunteers, which as with other "eastern formations" were intended for use against "irregular forces". A second Waffen-SS cavalry division followed in April 1944, the 22nd SS Volunteer Cavalry Division. The bulk of the troops were Hungarian Army Volksdeutsche conscripts transferred to the Waffen-SS following an agreement between Germany and Hungary. The 23rd SS Volunteer Panzergrenadier Division Nederland followed, formed from the 4th SS Volunteer Panzergrenadier Brigade Nederland, but it was never more than a large brigade. The 24th Waffen Mountain Division of the SS Karstjäger was another division that was never more than brigade size, consisting mainly of ethnic German volunteers from Italy and Yugoslavia, along with volunteers from Slovenia, Croatia, Serbia, and Ukraine. They were primarily involved in fighting partisans in the Kras region of the Alps on the frontiers of Slovenia, Italy, and Austria, the mountainous terrain requiring specialised mountain troops and equipment. Two Hungarian divisions followed: the 25th Waffen Grenadier Division of the SS Hunyadi (1st Hungarian) and the 26th Waffen Grenadier Division of the SS (2nd Hungarian). These were formed under the authority of the Hungarian defence minister, at the request of Himmler. One regiment from the Hungarian Army was ordered to join, but they mostly consisted of Hungarian and Romanian volunteers.

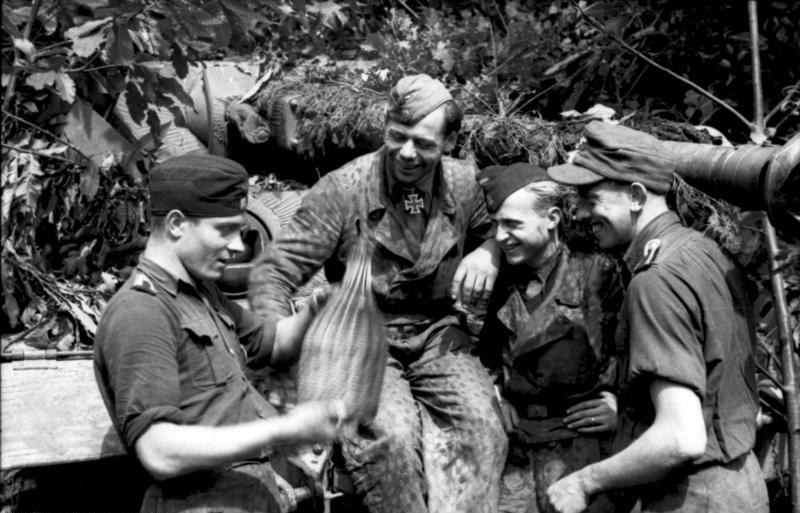
Members of the Waffen-SS in front of a camouflaged tank in France, June 1944

The SS Division Langemarck was formed next in October 1944, from Flemish volunteers added to the 6th SS Volunteer Assault Brigade Langemarck, but again it was nothing more than a large brigade. The 5th SS Volunteer Assault Brigade Wallonien was also upgraded to the SS Division Wallonien, but it too was never more than a large brigade. Plans to convert the Kaminski Brigade into the 29th Waffen Grenadier Division of the SS RONA (1st Russian) were dropped after the execution of their commander, Bronislav Kaminski; instead the Waffen Grenadier Brigade of SS (Italian no. 1) became the 29th Waffen Grenadier Division of the SS (1st Italian). The 30th Waffen Grenadier Division of the SS (2nd Russian) was formed from the Schutzmannschaft-Brigade Siegling. The final new division of late 1944 was the 31st SS Volunteer Grenadier Division, formed from Hungarians and conscripted Volksdeutsche.

In November 1944 the 1st Cossack Division, originally mustered by the German Army in 1943, was taken over by the Waffen-SS. The SS Führungshauptamt reorganised the division and used further Cossack combat units from the army and the Ordnungspolizei to form a 2nd Cossack Division. Both divisions were placed under the command of the XV SS Cossack Cavalry Corps on 1 February 1945. With the transfer of the 5th Volunteer Cossack-Stamm-Regiment from the Freiwilligen-Stamm-Division on the same day the takeover of the Cossack units by the Waffen-SS was complete.

==== Korsun-Cherkassy Pocket ====
The Korsun-Cherkassy Pocket was formed in January 1944 when units of the 8th Army withdrew to the Panther-Wotan Line, a defensive position along the Dnieper River in Ukraine. Two army corps were left holding a salient into the Soviet lines extending some 100 kilometres (62 mi). The Red Army's 1st and 2nd Ukrainian Fronts encircled the pocket. Trapped in the pocket were a total of six German divisions, including the 5th SS Wiking Division, with the attached 5th SS Volunteer Assault Brigade Wallonien, and the Estonian SS Battalion Narwa. The Germans broke out in coordination with other German forces from the outside, including the 1st SS Panzer Division Leibstandarte. Roughly two out of every three encircled men successfully escaped the pocket.

==== Raid on Drvar ====
The Raid on Drvar, codenamed Operation Rösselsprung, was an attack by the Waffen-SS and Luftwaffe on the command structure of the Yugoslav partisans. Their objective was the elimination of the partisan-controlled Supreme Headquarters and the capture of Tito. The offensive took place in April and May 1944. The Waffen-SS units involved were the 500th SS Parachute Battalion and the 7th SS Prinz Eugen Division.

The assault started when a small group parachuted into Drvar to secure landing grounds for the following glider force. The 500th SS Parachute Battalion fought their way to Tito's cave headquarters and exchanged heavy gunfire resulting in numerous casualties on both sides. By the time German forces had penetrated into the cave, Tito had already escaped. At the end of the battle, only 200 men of the 500th SS Parachute Battalion remained unwounded.

==== Baltic states ====
In Estonia, the Battle of Narva started in February. The battle can be divided into two phases: the Battle for Narva Bridgehead from February to July and the Battle of Tannenberg Line from July to September. A number of volunteer and conscript Waffen-SS units from Norway, Denmark, the Netherlands, Belgium, and Estonia fought in Narva. The units were all part of the III SS (Germanic) Panzer Corps in Army Group North, which consisted of the 11th SS Panzergrenadier Division Nordland, the 4th SS Volunteer Panzergrenadier Brigade Nederland, the 5th SS Volunteer Assault Brigade Wallonien, the 6th SS Volunteer Assault Brigade Langemarck, and the conscript 20th Waffen Grenadier Division of the SS (1st Estonian), under the command of Obergruppenführer Felix Steiner.

Also in Army Group North was the VI SS Corps, which consisted of the 15th Waffen Grenadier Division of the SS (1st Latvian) and the 19th Waffen Grenadier Division of the SS (2nd Latvian). Latvian Waffen SS and German Army units held out in the Courland Pocket until the end of the war.

==== Normandy ====
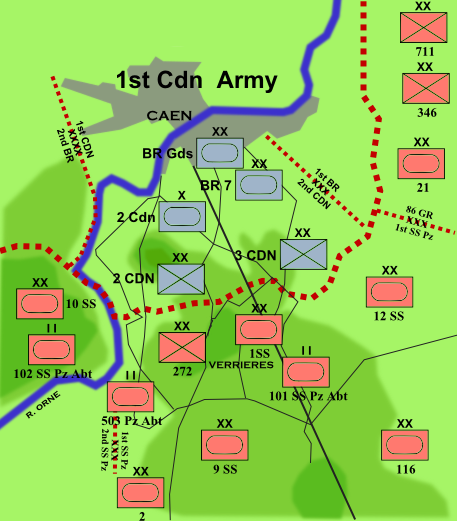
The starting lines of Operation Spring. Waffen-SS units identified are the 1st, 9th, 10th, and 12th SS Divisions and the 101st and 102nd SS Heavy Panzer Battalions.

Operation Overlord, the Allied "D-Day" landings in Normandy, took place on 6 June 1944. In preparation for the expected landings, the I SS Panzer Corps was moved to Septeuil to the west of Paris in April 1944. The corps had the 1st SS Panzer Division Leibstandarte SS Adolf Hitler, the 12th SS Panzer Division Hitlerjugend, and the 17th SS Panzergrenadier Götz von Berlichingen Divisions, along with the army's Panzer-Lehr-Division assigned to it. The corps was to form a part of General Leo Geyr von Schweppenburg's Panzer Group West, the Western theatre's armoured reserve. The corps was restructured on 4 July 1944 and only the 1st SS Leibstandarte and the 12th SS Hitlerjugend Divisions remained on strength.

After the landings, the first Waffen-SS unit in action was the 12th SS Hitlerjugend Division, which arrived at the invasion front on 7 June, in the Caen area. That same day they committed the Ardenne Abbey massacre against Canadian Army prisoners of war. The next unit to arrive was the 17th SS Division Götz von Berlichingen on 11 June, which came into contact with the US 101st Airborne Division. The 101st SS Heavy Panzer Battalion arrived next to protect the left wing of the I SS Panzer Corps. The 1st SS Division Leibstandarte arrived towards the end of the month with lead elements becoming embroiled in the British offensive Operation Epsom.

The only other Waffen-SS unit in France at this time was the 2nd SS Panzer Division Das Reich, in Montauban, north of Toulouse. They were ordered north to the landing beaches and on 9 June were responsible for the Tulle massacre, where 99 men were murdered. The next day, they reached the village of Oradour-sur-Glane where they massacred 642 civilians including 247 children.

The II SS Panzer Corps, consisting of the 9th SS Hohenstaufen and 10th SS Frundsberg Panzer Divisions and the 102nd SS Heavy Panzer Battalion, was transferred from the Eastern Front to spearhead an offensive to destroy the Allied beachhead. However, the British launched Operation Epsom and the two divisions were fed piecemeal into the battle, and launched several counterattacks over the following days.

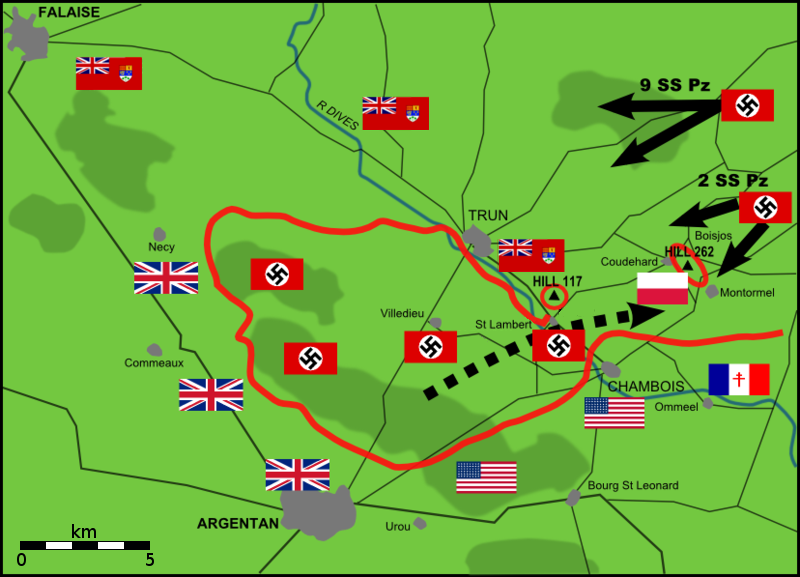
German counterattacks against Canadian-Polish positions on 20 August 1944

Without any further reinforcements in men or materiel, the Waffen-SS divisions could not stop the Allied advance. Both the 1st SS and 2nd SS Panzer Divisions took part in the failed Operation Lüttich in early August. The end came in mid August when the German Army was encircled and trapped in the Falaise pocket, including the 1st SS, 10th SS, 12th SS, and 17th SS Divisions, while the 2nd SS and 9th SS Panzer Divisions were ordered to attack Hill 262 from the outside in order to keep the gap open. By 22 August, the Falaise pocket had been closed, and all German forces west of the Allied lines were either dead or in captivity. In the fighting around Hill 262 alone, casualties totalled 2,000 killed and 5,000 taken prisoner. The 12th SS Panzer Division Hitlerjugend had lost 94 per cent of its armour, nearly all of its artillery, and 70 per cent of its vehicles. The division had close to 20,000 men and 150 tanks before the campaign started, and was now reduced to just 300 men and 10 tanks.

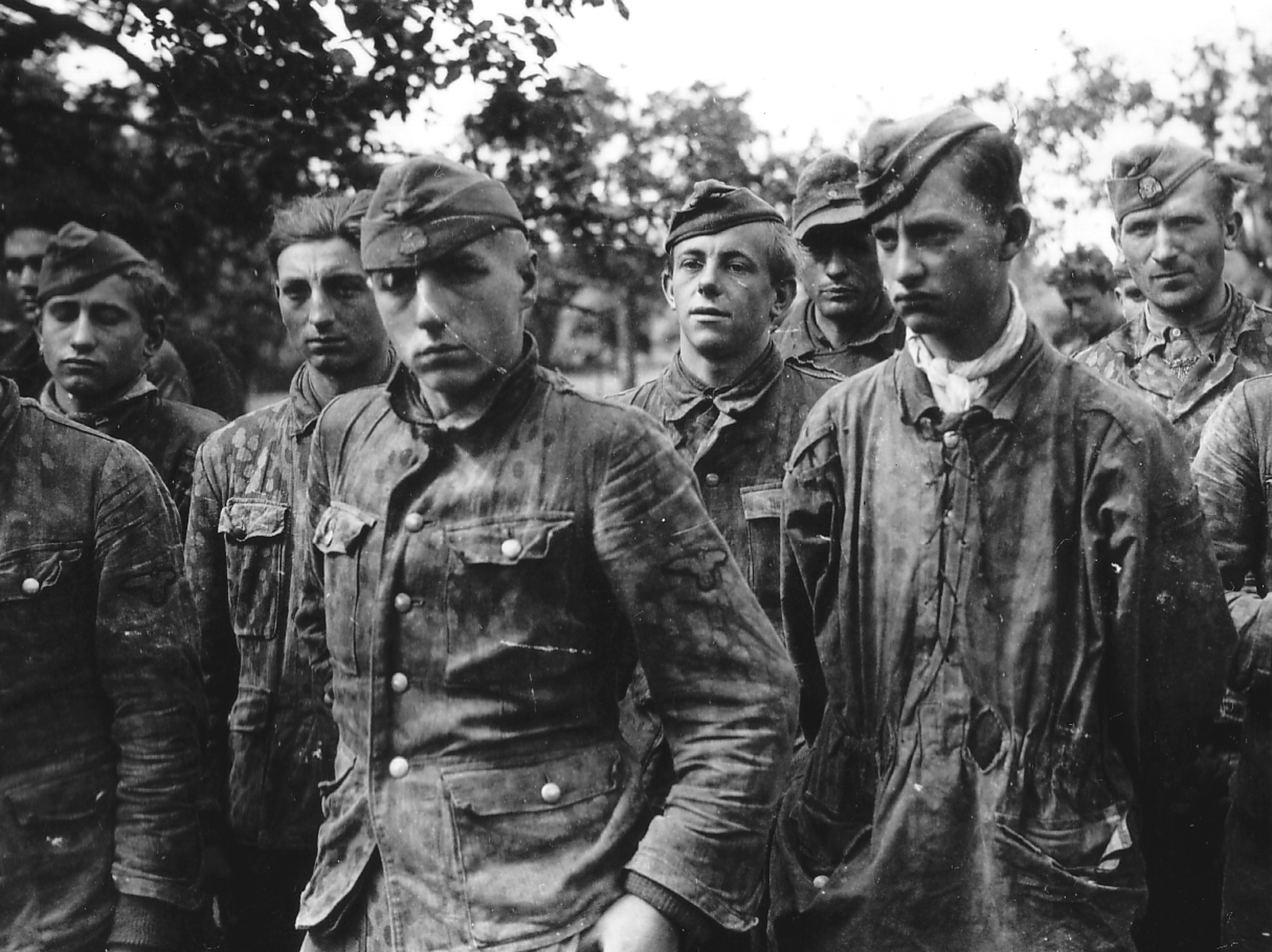
12 SS Hitlerjugend troops taken prisoner in Normandy

With the German Army in full retreat, two further Waffen-SS formations entered the battle in France, the SS Panzergrenadier Brigade 49 and the SS Panzergrenadier Brigade 51. Both had been formed in June 1944 from staff and students at the SS Junker Schools. They were stationed in Denmark to allow the garrison there to move into France, but were brought forward at the beginning of August to the area south and east of Paris. Both brigades were tasked to hold crossings over the Seine River allowing the army to retreat. Eventually, they were forced back and then withdrew, the surviving troops being incorporated into the 17th SS Division.

==== Greece ====
While the bulk of the Waffen-SS was now on the Eastern Front or in Normandy, the 4th SS Polizei Panzergrenadier Division was stationed in Greece on internal security duties and anti-partisan operations. On 10 June, they committed the Distomo massacre, when over a period of two hours they went door to door and massacred Greek civilians, reportedly in revenge for a Greek resistance attack. In total, 218 men, women, and children were murdered. According to survivors, the SS forces "bayoneted babies in their cribs, stabbed pregnant women, and beheaded the village priest."

==== Italy ====
On the Italian Front, the 16th SS Panzergrenadier Division Reichsführer-SS, conducting anti-partisan operations, is remembered more for the atrocities it perpetrated than its fighting ability; the division committed the Sant'Anna di Stazzema massacre in August 1944 and the Marzabotto massacre between September and October 1944.

==== Finland ====
In Finland, the 6th SS Mountain Division Nord had held its lines during the Soviet summer offensive until it was ordered to withdraw from Finland upon the conclusion of an armistice between Finland and the Soviet Union in September 1944. It then formed the rear guard for the three German corps withdrawing from Finland in Operation Birch, and from September to November 1944 marched 1,600 km (990 mi) to Mo i Rana, Norway, where it entrained for the southern end of the country, crossing the Skagerrak to Denmark.

==== Arnhem and Operation Market Garden ====
In early September 1944, the II SS Panzer Corps (comprising the 9th and 10th SS Panzer Divisions) was pulled out of the line and sent to the Arnhem area in the Netherlands. Upon arrival, they began the task of refitting, and the majority of the remaining armoured vehicles were loaded onto trains in preparation for transport to repair depots in Germany. On 17 September 1944, the Allies launched Operation Market Garden, and the British 1st Airborne Division was dropped in Oosterbeek, to the west of Arnhem. Realizing the threat, Wilhelm Bittrich, commander of the II SS Panzer Corps, ordered the Hohenstaufen and Frundsberg divisions to ready themselves for combat. Also in the area was the Training and Reserve Battalion of the 16th SS Division. The Allied airborne operation was a failure, and Arnhem was not liberated until 14 April 1945.

==== Warsaw Uprising ====
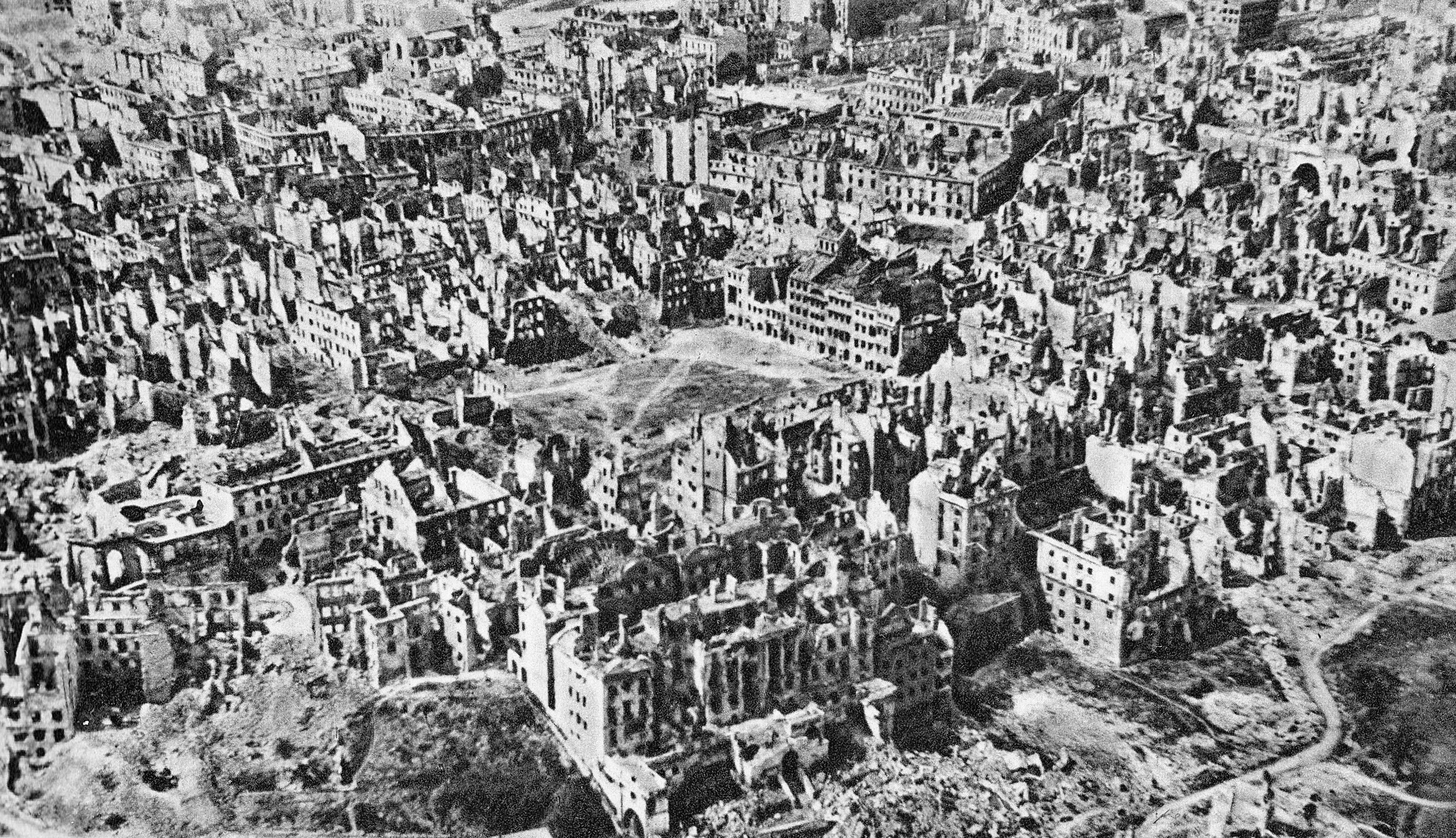
Ruins of Warsaw's Old Town Market Square. In total, eighty-five per cent of the city was destroyed and nearly 200,000 civilians killed.

At the other end of Europe, the Waffen-SS was dealing with the Warsaw Uprising. Between August and October 1944, the SS-Sonderregiment Dirlewanger (recruited from probationary troops, common criminals and the mentally ill throughout Germany), which included the Azerbaijani Legion (part of the Ostlegionen), and the SS Assault Brigade RONA (Russian National Liberation Army), which was made up of anti-Soviet Russian, Belarusian, and Ukrainian collaborators, were both sent to Warsaw to put down the uprising. During the battle, the SS-Sonderregiment Dirlewanger behaved atrociously, raping, looting, and killing citizens regardless of whether they belonged to the Polish resistance or not; the unit's commander SS-Oberführer Oskar Dirlewanger encouraged their excesses. The unit's behaviour was reportedly so bestial and indiscriminate that Himmler was forced to send a battalion of SS military police to ensure the Dirlewanger convicts did not turn their aggressions against the leadership of the brigade or other nearby German units. At the same time, they were encouraged by Himmler to terrorise freely, take no prisoners, and generally indulge their perverse tendencies. Favoured tactics during the siege, particularly of the SS-Sonderregiment Dirlewanger, included the ubiquitous gang rape of female Poles, both women and children; playing "bayonet catch" with live babies; and torturing captives to death by hacking off their arms, dousing them with gasoline, and setting them alight to run armless and flaming down the street. The Police unit under Reinefarth that followed SS-Sonderregiment Dirlewanger committed almost non-stop atrocities during this period, in particular the Wola massacre.

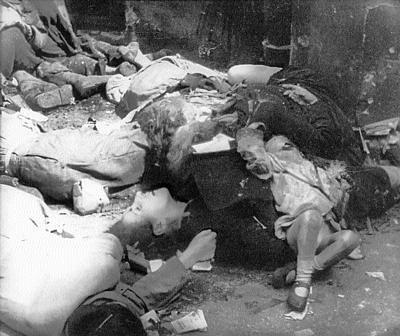
Photo taken by the Polish Underground showing the bodies of women and children murdered by SS troops during the Warsaw Uprising, August 1944

The other unit, the Kaminski Brigade, was tasked with clearing the Ochota district in Warsaw that was defended by members of the Polish Home Army. Their attack was planned for the morning of 5 August, but when the time came, the Kaminski Brigade could not be found; after some searching by the SS military police, members of the unit were found looting abandoned houses in the rear of the German column. Later, thousands of Polish civilians were killed during the events known as the Ochota massacre; many victims were also raped. (Note: "Adolf Hitler is not interested in further existence of Warsaw ... the whole population shall be executed and all buildings blown up.".) (Note: According to the evidence of Erich von dem Bach at the International Military Tribunal Nuremberg, Himmler's order (issued on the strength of an order of Hitler), read as follows: "1. Caught razed insurgents shall be killed despite whether they fight in accordance with the Hague Convention or they infringe it. 2. Non-fighting part of population, women, children, shall also be killed. 3. All the city shall be razed to the ground, i.e. buildings, streets, facilities in that city, and everything which is within its borders.".) In the following weeks, the unit was moved south to the Wola district, but it fared no better in combat there than it did in Ochota; in one incident, a sub-unit of the Kaminski Brigade advanced to loot a captured building on the front line, but was subsequently cut off from the rest of the SS formation and wiped out by the Poles. Following the fiasco, Waffen-Brigadeführer Bronislav Vladislavovich Kaminski, the unit's commander, was called to Łódź to attend an SS leadership conference. He never arrived; official Nazi sources blamed Polish partisans for an alleged ambush that killed the RONA commander. But, according to various other sources, he was arrested and tried by the SS, or simply shot on spot by the Gestapo. The behaviour of the Kaminski Brigade during the battle was an embarrassment even to the SS, and the alleged rape and murder of two German Strength Through Joy girls may have played a part in the eventual execution of the brigade's commander.

==== Vistula River line ====
In late August 1944, the 5th SS Panzer Division Wiking was ordered back to Modlin on the Vistula River line near Warsaw, where it was to join the newly formed Army Group Vistula. Fighting alongside the Luftwaffe's 1st Fallschirm-Panzer Division Hermann Göring, they were faced against the Soviet 3rd Tank Corps. The advent of the Warsaw Uprising brought the Soviet offensive to a halt, and relative peace fell on the front line. The division remained in the Modlin area, grouped with the 3rd SS Panzer Division Totenkopf in the IV SS Panzer Corps. Heavy defensive battles around Modlin followed for the rest of the year.

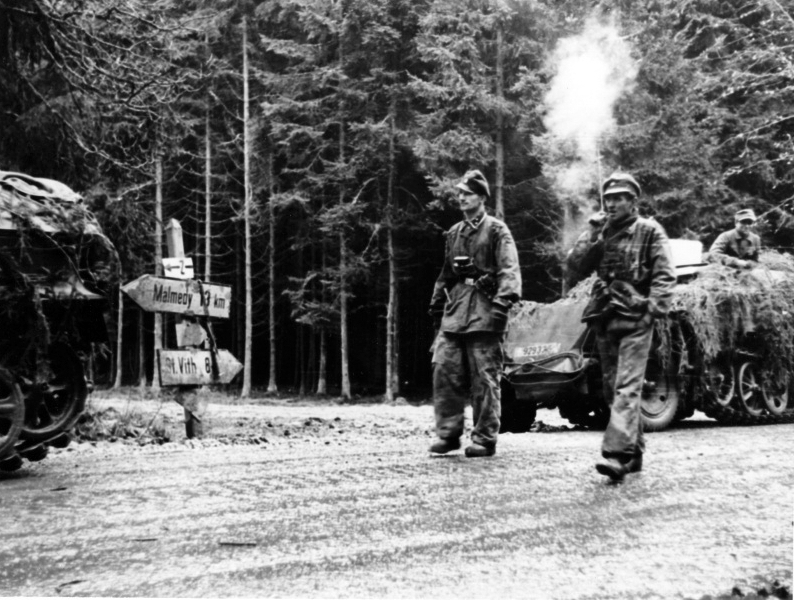
Kampfgruppe Knittel's troops on the road to Stavelot to support Peiper

The Ardennes Offensive (popularly known as the "Battle of the Bulge"), between 16 December 1944 and 25 January 1945, was a major German offensive through the forested Ardennes mountains region of Belgium. The Waffen-SS units included the 6th Panzer Army under Sepp Dietrich. Created on 26 October 1944, it incorporated the I SS Panzer Corps (the 1st and 12th SS Panzer Divisions along with the 101st SS Heavy Panzer Battalion). It also had the II SS Panzer Corps (the 2nd and 9th SS Panzer Divisions). Another unit involved was Otto Skorzeny's SS Panzer Brigade 150.

The purpose of the attack was to split the British and American line in half, capture Antwerp, and encircle and destroy four Allied armies, forcing the Western Allies to negotiate a peace treaty on terms favourable to the Axis Powers. However, advancing through the forests and wooded hills of the Ardennes proved difficult in the winter weather. Initially, the Germans made good progress in the northern end of its advance. However, they ran into unexpectedly strong resistance by the US 2nd and 99th Infantry Divisions. By 23 December, weather conditions started improving, allowing the Allied air forces, which had been grounded, to attack. In increasingly difficult conditions, the German advance slowed. The attack was ultimately a failure. Despite the efforts of the Waffen-SS and the German Army, fuel shortages, stiff American resistance, including in and around the town of Bastogne, and Allied air-assaults on German supply columns proved too much, costing the Germans 700 tanks and most of their remaining mobile forces in the west. Hitler's failed counteroffensive had used most of Germany's remaining reserves of manpower and materiel, which could not be replaced.

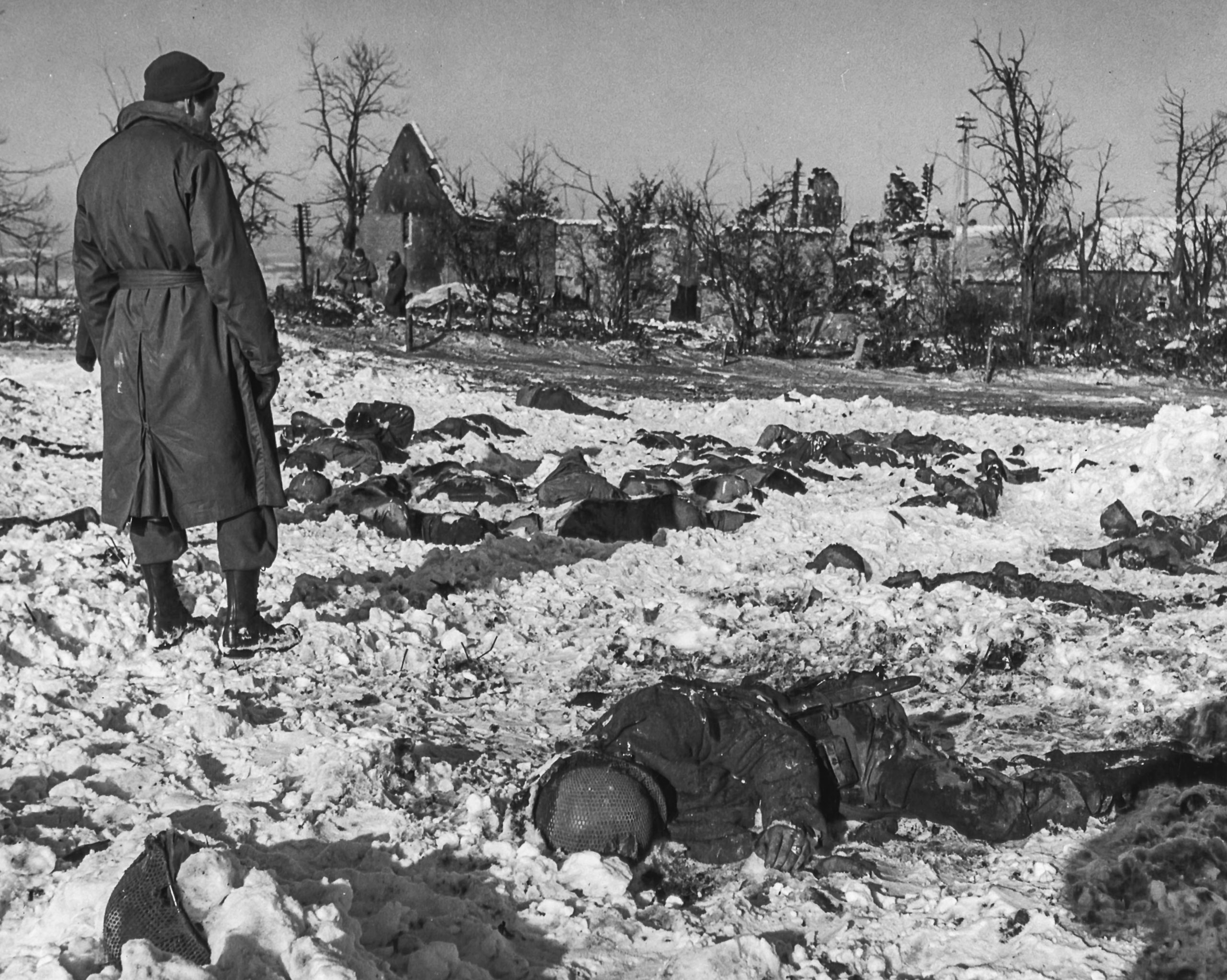
Aftermath of the Malmedy Massacre

During the battle, Kampfgruppe Peiper, part of the Leibstandarte Division, left a path of destruction, which included Waffen-SS soldiers massacring American POWs, raping Belgian women, and looting and murdering unarmed Belgian civilians. It is infamous for the Malmedy massacre, in which approximately 90 unarmed American prisoners of war were murdered on 17 December 1944. Also during this battle, 3./SS-PzAA1 LSSAH captured and shot eleven African-American soldiers from the US 333rd Field Artillery Battalion in the hamlet of Wereth. Their remains were found by Allied troops two months later. The soldiers had their fingers cut off and legs broken, and one was shot while trying to bandage a comrade's wounds.

==== Siege of Budapest ====
In late December 1944, Axis forces, including the IX SS Mountain Corps, defending Budapest, were encircled in the Siege of Budapest. The IV SS Panzer Corps (the 3rd and 5th SS Panzer Divisions) was ordered south to join General Hermann Balck's 6th Army (Army Group Balck), which was mustering for a relief effort code named Operation Konrad.

As a part of Operation Konrad I, the IV SS Panzer Corps was committed to action on 1 January 1945, near Tata, with the advance columns of the Wiking Division slamming into the Soviet 4th Guards Army. A heavy battle ensued, with the Wiking and Totenkopf Division destroying many of the Soviet tanks. In three days their panzer spearheads had driven 45 km (28 mi), over half the distance from the start point to Budapest. The Red Army manoeuvred forces to block the advance, halting them at Bicske, 28 km (17 mi) from Budapest. Two further attacks, Operations Konrad II and III, also failed.

The Hungarian Third Army was besieged in Budapest along with the IX SS Mountain Corps (the 8th and 22nd SS Cavalry Divisions). The siege lasted from 29 December 1944 until the city surrendered unconditionally on 13 February 1945. Only 170 men of the 22nd SS Cavalry Division made it back to the German lines.

=== 1945 ===
==== 1945 expansion ====
The Waffen-SS continued to expand in 1945. January saw the 32nd SS Volunteer Grenadier Division 30 Januar formed from the remnants of other units and staff from the SS Junker Schools. In February, the Waffen Grenadier Brigade of the SS Charlemagne was upgraded to a division and became known as the 33rd Waffen Grenadier Division of the SS Charlemagne (1st French). At this time, it had a strength of 7,340 men. The SS Volunteer Grenadier Brigade Landstorm Nederland was upgraded to the 34th SS Volunteer Grenadier Division Landstorm Nederland. The second SS police division followed when the 35th SS-Police Grenadier Division was formed from SS police units that had been transferred to the Waffen-SS. The Dirlewanger Brigade was reformed as the 36th Waffen Grenadier Division of the SS. As there was now a real shortage of Waffen-SS volunteers and conscripts, units from the army were attached to bring it up to strength. The third SS cavalry division, the 37th SS Volunteer Cavalry Division, was formed from the remnants of the 8th and 22nd SS Cavalry Divisions, which had both been virtually destroyed. The last Waffen-SS division was the 38th SS Grenadier Division Nibelungen, which was formed from students and staff from the SS Junker Schools, but consisted of only around 6,000 men, the strength of a normal brigade.

==== Operation Nordwind ====
Operation Nordwind was the last major German offensive on the Western Front. It began on 1 January 1945 in Alsace and Lorraine in northeastern France, and it ended on 25 January. The initial attack was conducted by three corps of the 1st Army. By 15 January, at least 17 German divisions (including units in the Colmar Pocket) were engaged, including the XIII SS Army Corps (the 17th and 38th SS Divisions) and the 6th and 10th SS Panzer Divisions. At the same time, the Luftwaffe mounted a large offensive over the skies of France. Some 240 fighters were lost and just as many pilots. It was the 'last gasp' attempt for the Luftwaffe to take back air supremacy from the Western Allies.

==== Operation Solstice ====
Operation Solstice, or the "Stargard Tank Battle" (February 1945) was one of the last armoured offensive operations on the Eastern Front. It was a limited counterattack by the three Corps of the 11th SS Panzer Army, which was being assembled in Pomerania, against the spearheads of the Soviet 1st Belorussian Front. Originally planned as a major offensive, it was executed as a more limited attack. It was repulsed by the Red Army, but helped to convince the Soviet High Command to postpone the planned attack on Berlin.

Initially, the attack achieved a total surprise, reaching the banks of the Ina River and, on 17 January, Arnswalde. Strong Soviet counterattacks halted the advance, and the operation was called off. The III (Germanic) SS Panzer Corps was pulled back to Stargard and Stettin on the northern Oder River.

==== East Pomeranian Offensive ====
The East Pomeranian Offensive lasted from 24 February to 4 April, in Pomerania and West Prussia. The Waffen-SS units involved were the 11th SS Nordland, 20th SS Estonian, 23rd SS Nederland, 27th SS Langemark, and 28th SS Wallonien Divisions all in the III (Germanic) SS Panzer Corps and the X SS Corps, which did not command any SS units.

In March 1945, the X SS Corps was encircled by the 1st Guards Tank Army, 3rd Shock Army, and First Polish Army in the area of Dramburg. This pocket was destroyed by the Red Army on 7 March 1945. On 8 March 1945, the Soviets announced the capture of General Krappe and 8,000 men of the corps.

==== Operation Spring Awakening ====
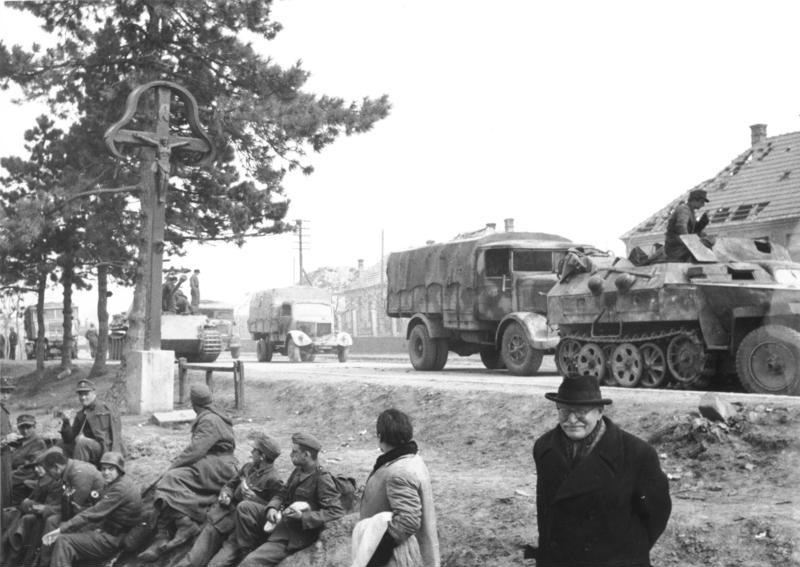
German units during the Lake Balaton Offensive, March 1945

After the Ardennes offensive failed, in Hitler's estimation, the Nagykanizsa oilfields southwest of Lake Balaton were the most strategically valuable reserves on the Eastern Front. The SS divisions were pulled out and refitted in Germany in preparation for Operation Spring Awakening (Frühlingserwachsen). Hitler ordered Dietrich's 6th Panzer Army to take the lead and move to Hungary in order to protect the oilfields and refineries there. The 6th Panzer Army was made up of the I SS Panzer Corps (the 1st and 12th SS Panzer Divisions) and the II SS Panzer Corps (the 2nd and 10th SS Panzer Divisions). Also present but not part of the 6th Panzer Army was the IV SS Panzer Corps (the 3rd and 5th SS Panzer Divisions).

This final German offensive in the east began on 6 March. The German forces attacked near Lake Balaton with the 6th Panzer Army advancing northwards towards Budapest and the 2nd Panzer Army moving eastwards and south. Dietrich's army made "good progress" at first, but as they drew near the Danube, the combination of the muddy terrain and strong resistance by the Soviets ground them to a halt. The overwhelming numerical superiority of the Red Army made any defence impossible, yet Hitler somehow had believed victory was attainable.

After Operation Spring Awakening, the 6th Panzer Army withdrew towards Vienna and was involved what became known as the Vienna Offensive. The only major force to face the attacking Red Army was the II SS Panzer Corps (the 2nd and 3rd SS Panzer Divisions), under the command of Wilhelm Bittrich, along with ad hoc forces made up of garrison and anti-aircraft units. Vienna fell to the Soviets on 13 April. Bittrich's II SS Panzer Corps had pulled out to the west that evening to avoid encirclement. The LSSAH retreated westward with less than 1,600 men and 16 tanks remaining.

This failure is famous for the "armband order" that followed. The order was issued to Dietrich by Hitler, who claimed that the troops, and more importantly, the 1st SS Division Leibstandarte, "did not fight as the situation demanded". As a mark of disgrace, the Waffen-SS units involved in the battle were ordered to remove their distinctive cuff titles. Dietrich did not relay the order to his troops.

==== Berlin ====
Army Group Vistula was formed in 1945 to protect Berlin from the advancing Red Army. It fought in the Battle of the Seelow Heights (16–19 April) and the Battle of Halbe (21 April – 1 May), both part of the Battle of Berlin. The Waffen-SS was represented by the III (Germanic) SS Panzer Corps.

On 23 April, SS-Brigadeführer Wilhelm Mohnke was appointed by Hitler as Battle Commander for the centre government district (Zitadelle sector), which included the Reich Chancellery and the Führerbunker. Mohnke's command post was in the bunkers under the Reich Chancellery. He formed Kampfgruppe Mohnke, divided into two weak regiments. It was made up of the LSSAH Flak Company, replacements from the LSSAH Training and Reserve Battalion from Spreenhagan (under Standartenfuhrer Anhalt), 600 men from the Begleit-Bataillon Reichsführer-SS, the Führer-Begleit-Company, and the core group—800 men of the LSSAH Guard Battalion assigned to guard the Führer.

On 23 April, the Reich Chancellery ordered SS-Brigadeführer Gustav Krukenberg to proceed to Berlin with his men, who were reorganised as Assault Battalion Charlemagne. Between 320 and 330 French troops arrived in Berlin on 24 April after a long detour to avoid Soviet advance columns. Krukenberg was also appointed the commander of (Berlin) Defence Sector C. This included the Nordland Division, whose previous commander, Joachim Ziegler, was relieved of command the same day. On 27 April, after a futile defence, the remnants of Nordland were pushed back into the centre government district (Zitadelle sector) in Defence Sector Z. There Krukenberg's headquarters was a carriage in the Stadtmitte U-Bahn station. The men of the Nordland Division were now under Mohnke's overall command. Among the men were French, Latvian, and Scandinavian Waffen-SS troops.

A heavy artillery bombardment of the centre government district had begun on 20 April 1945 and lasted until the end of hostilities. Under intense shelling, the SS troops put up stiff resistance which led to bitter and bloody street fighting with the Red Army. By 26 April, the defenders were pushed back into the Reichstag and Reich Chancellery. There, over the next few days, the survivors (mainly French SS troops from the former 33rd SS Division Charlemagne) fought in vain against the Soviets.

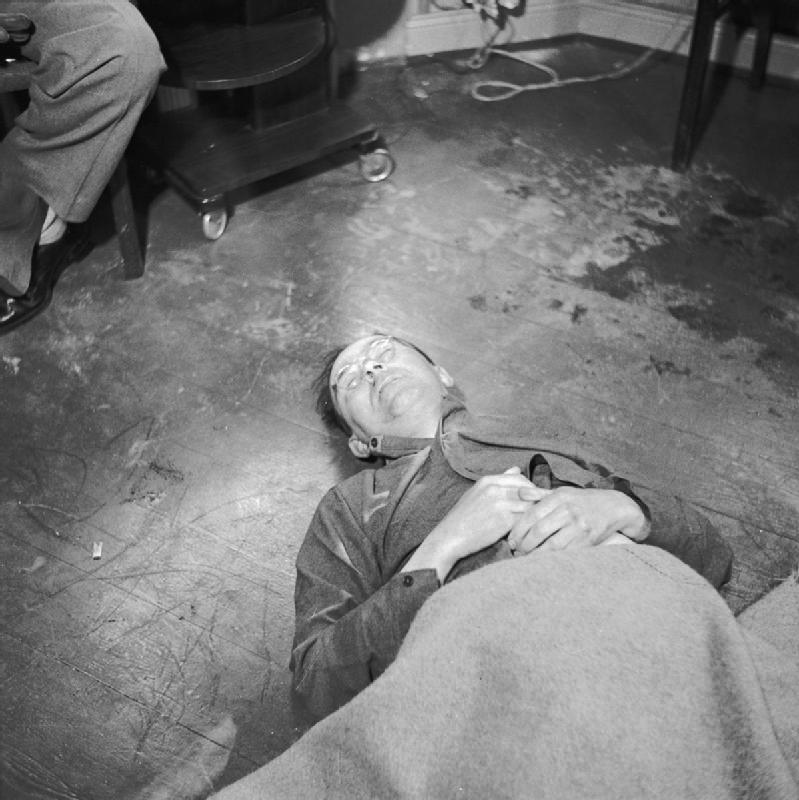
Heinrich Himmler's corpse after his suicide, May 1945

On 30 April, after receiving news of Hitler's suicide, orders were issued that those who could do so were to break out. Prior to the break-out, Mohnke briefed all commanders that could be reached within the Zitadelle sector about Hitler's death and the planned break-out. The break out started at 2300 hours on 1 May. There were ten main groups that attempted to head northwest towards Mecklenburg. Fierce fighting continued all around, especially in the Weidendammer Bridge area. What was left of the Nordland Division under Krukenberg fought hard in that area, but Soviet artillery, anti-tank guns, and tanks destroyed the groups. Several very small groups managed to reach the Americans at the Elbe's west bank, but most, including Mohnke's group, could not make it through the Soviet rings.

Himmler fled and attempted to go into hiding. Using a forged paybook under the name of Sergeant Heinrich Hitzinger, he fled south on 11 May to Friedrichskoog. On 21 May, Himmler and two aides were detained at a checkpoint set up by former Soviet POWs and then handed over to the British Army. On 23 May, after Himmler had admitted his real identity, a doctor attempted to examine him. However, Himmler bit into a hidden cyanide pill and collapsed onto the floor. He was dead within 15 minutes.

== Divisions ==
All divisions in the Waffen-SS were ordered in a single series of numbers as formed, regardless of type. A total of 39 were formed, beginning with the initial three in 1933 and ramping up to nine alone in 1945. Those tagged with nationalities were at least nominally recruited from those nationalities. Many of the late-formed higher-numbered units were in fact small battlegroups (Kampfgruppen), and divisions in name only.

== Highest ranked commanders ==
- Josef "Sepp" Dietrich, a former army sergeant with a peasant background, commanded the forerunner of the Waffen-SS, the Sonderkommando Berlin. He would command the Leibstandarte SS Adolf Hitler from its inception to regiment, brigade, and division. He was then given command of the I SS Panzer Corps and by the end of the war was the commander of the 6th Panzer Army.
- Paul Hausser, a former general in the regular army, was chosen by Himmler to transform the SS-VT into a credible military organisation. He was the first divisional commander of the Waffen-SS when the SS-VT was formed into a division for the Battle of France. He went on to command the II SS Panzer Corps and the 7th Army.

== Casualties ==
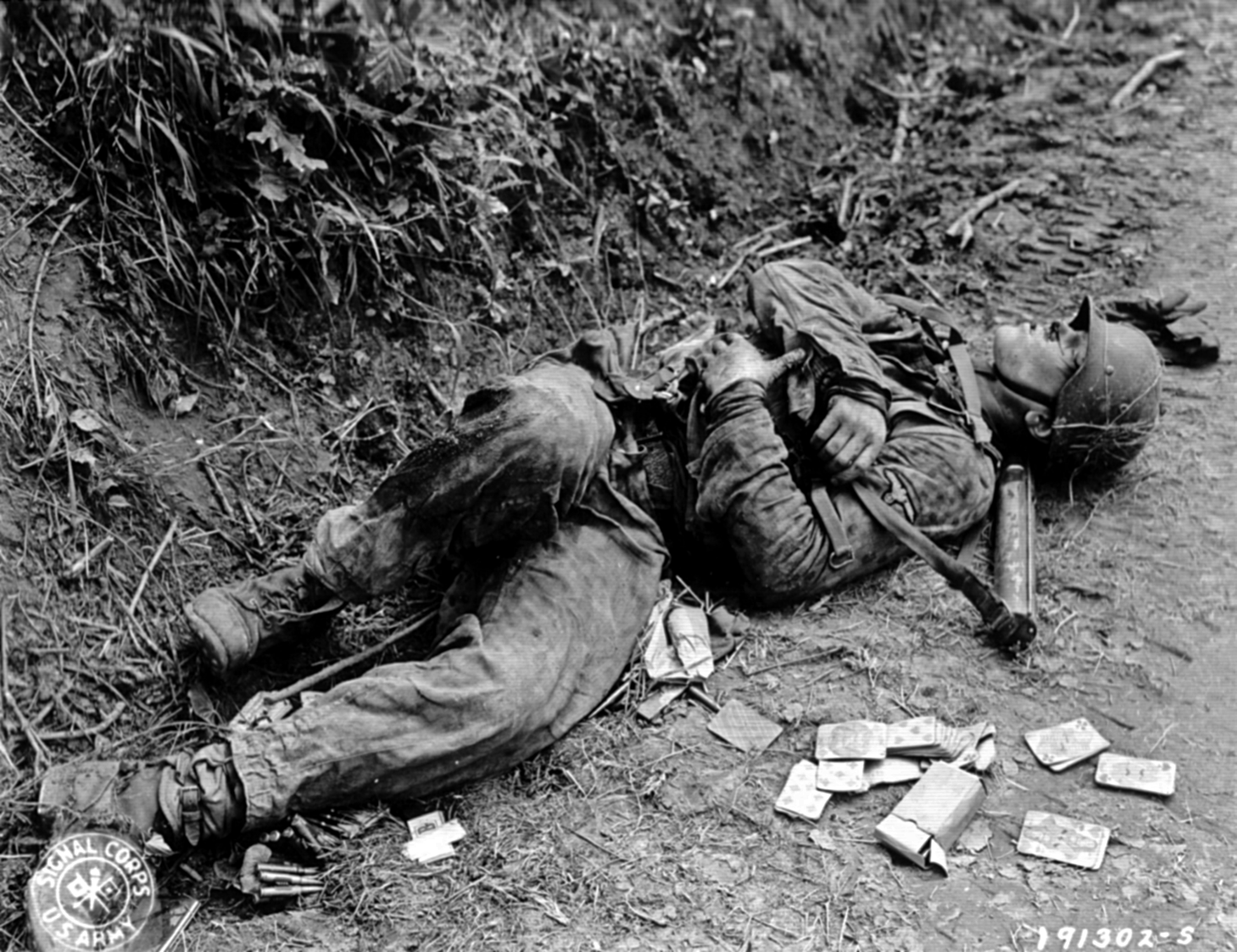
Waffen-SS casualty in northern France, June 1944

Military historian Rüdiger Overmans estimates that the Waffen-SS suffered 314,000 dead. Casualty rates were not significantly higher than in the Wehrmacht overall and were comparable to those among the armoured divisions of the army and the Luftwaffe paratroop formations.

== Criminality ==
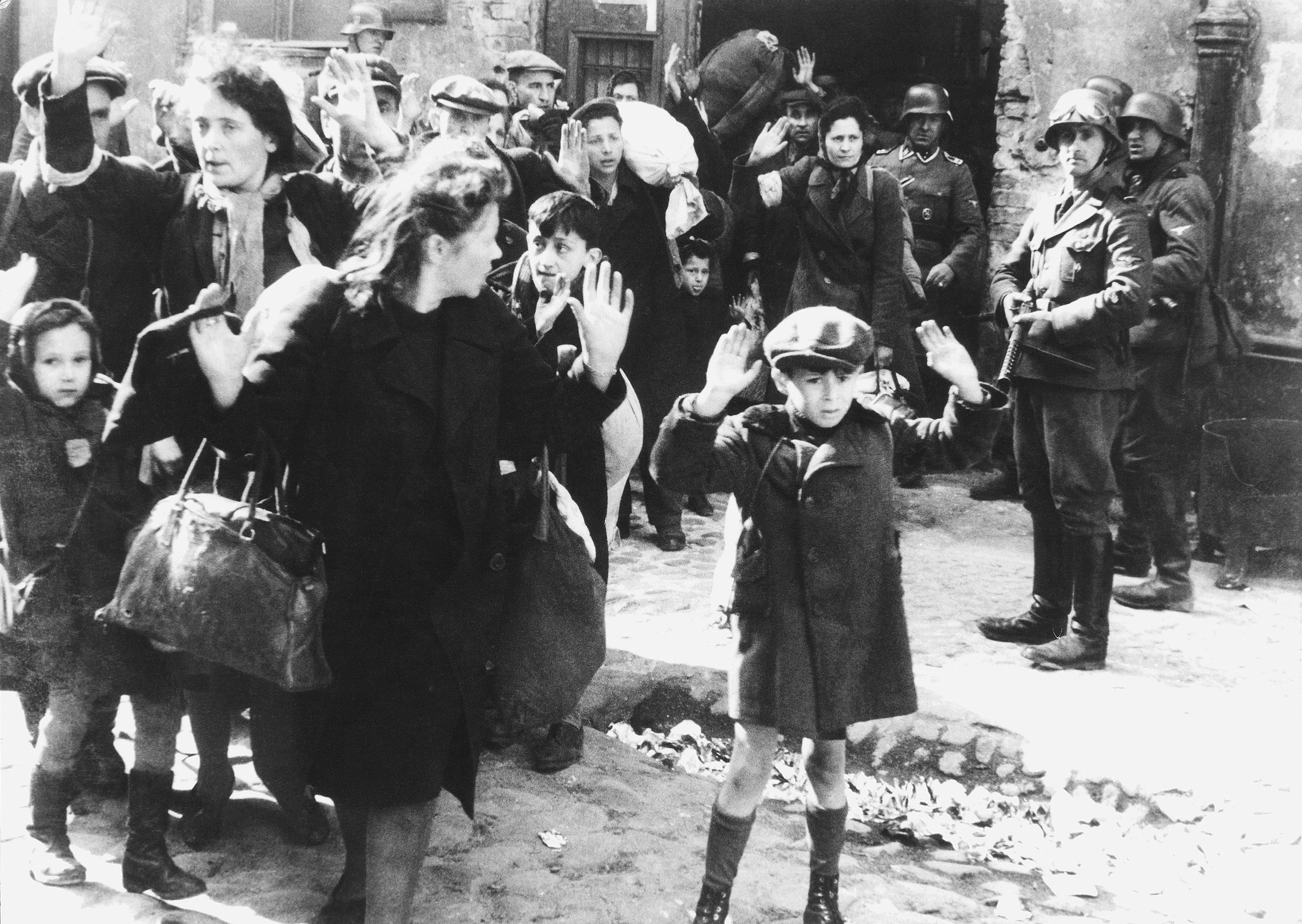
SS troops rounding up Jews for deportation to a death camp during the Warsaw Ghetto uprising

The Allgemeine SS was responsible for the administration of both the concentration and extermination camps. Many members of it and the SS-Totenkopfverbände subsequently became members of the Waffen-SS, forming the initial core of the 3rd SS Totenkopf Division. A number of SS medical personnel who were members of the Waffen-SS were convicted of crimes during the "Doctors' trials" in Nuremberg, held between 1946 and 1947 for the Nazi human experimentation they performed at the camps.

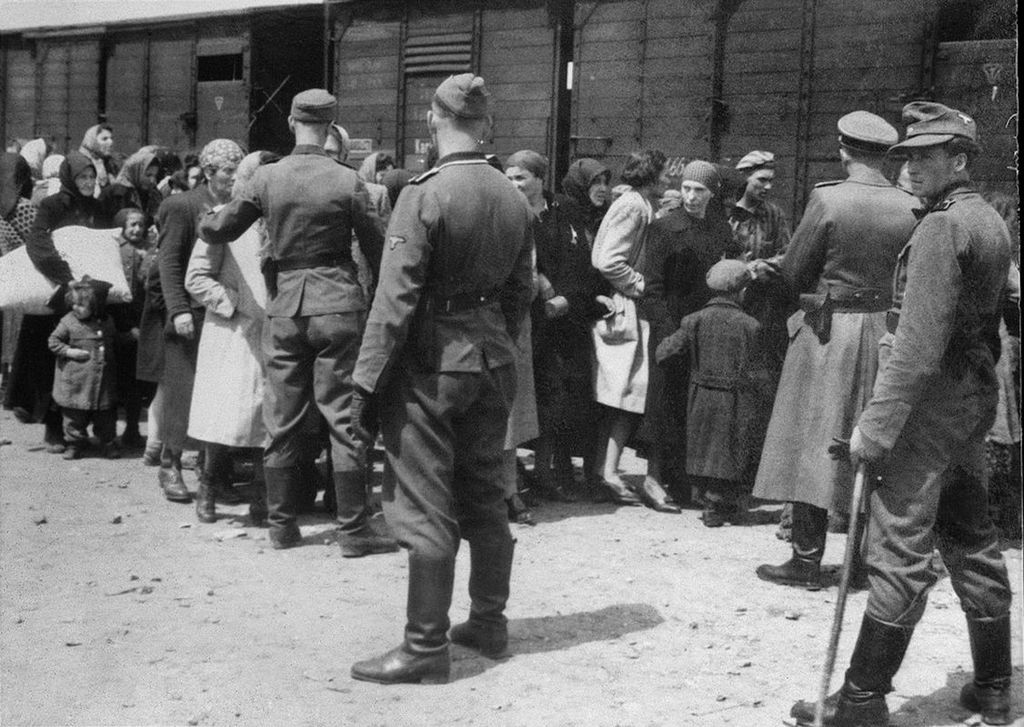
Stefan Baretzki (right), a Waffen-SS soldier, participating in a selection at Auschwitz concentration camp

According to the Modern Genocide: The Definitive Resource and Document Collection, the Waffen-SS had played a "paramount role" in the ideological war of extermination (Vernichtungskrieg), and not just as frontline or rear area security formations: a third of the Einsatzgruppen (mobile death squads) members, which were responsible for mass murder, especially of Jews, Slavs and communists, had been recruited from Waffen-SS personnel prior to the invasion of the Soviet Union. The Waffen-SS construction office built the gas chambers at Auschwitz, and, according to Rudolf Höss, about 7,000 served as guards at that camp.

Many Waffen-SS members and units were responsible for war crimes against civilians and allied servicemen. After the war the SS organisation as a whole was held to be a criminal organisation by the post-war German government. Formations such as the Dirlewanger and Kaminski Brigades were singled out, and many others participated in large-scale massacres or smaller-scale killings such as murder of 34 captured allied servicemen ordered by Josef Kieffer during Operation Bulbasket in 1944, the Houtman affair, or murders perpetrated by Heinrich Boere. The listed Waffen-SS units were responsible for the following massacres:

- Wormhoudt massacre by the SS Leibstandarte Adolf Hitler, 1940, France
- Le Paradis massacre by the SS Division Totenkopf, 1940, France
- Pripyat swamps (punitive operation) by the SS Cavalry Brigade, 1941, USSR
- Ascq massacre by the 12th SS Panzer Division Hitlerjugend, 1944, France
- Tulle massacre by 2nd SS Panzer Division Das Reich, 1944, France
- Oradour-sur-Glane massacre by the 2nd SS Panzer Division Das Reich, 1944, France
- Ochota massacre by the SS Kaminski Brigade, 1944, Poland
- Wola massacre by SS-Sonderregiment Dirlewanger, 1944, Poland
- Huta Pieniacka massacre by the 14th Galician SS Volunteer Division, 1944, Poland

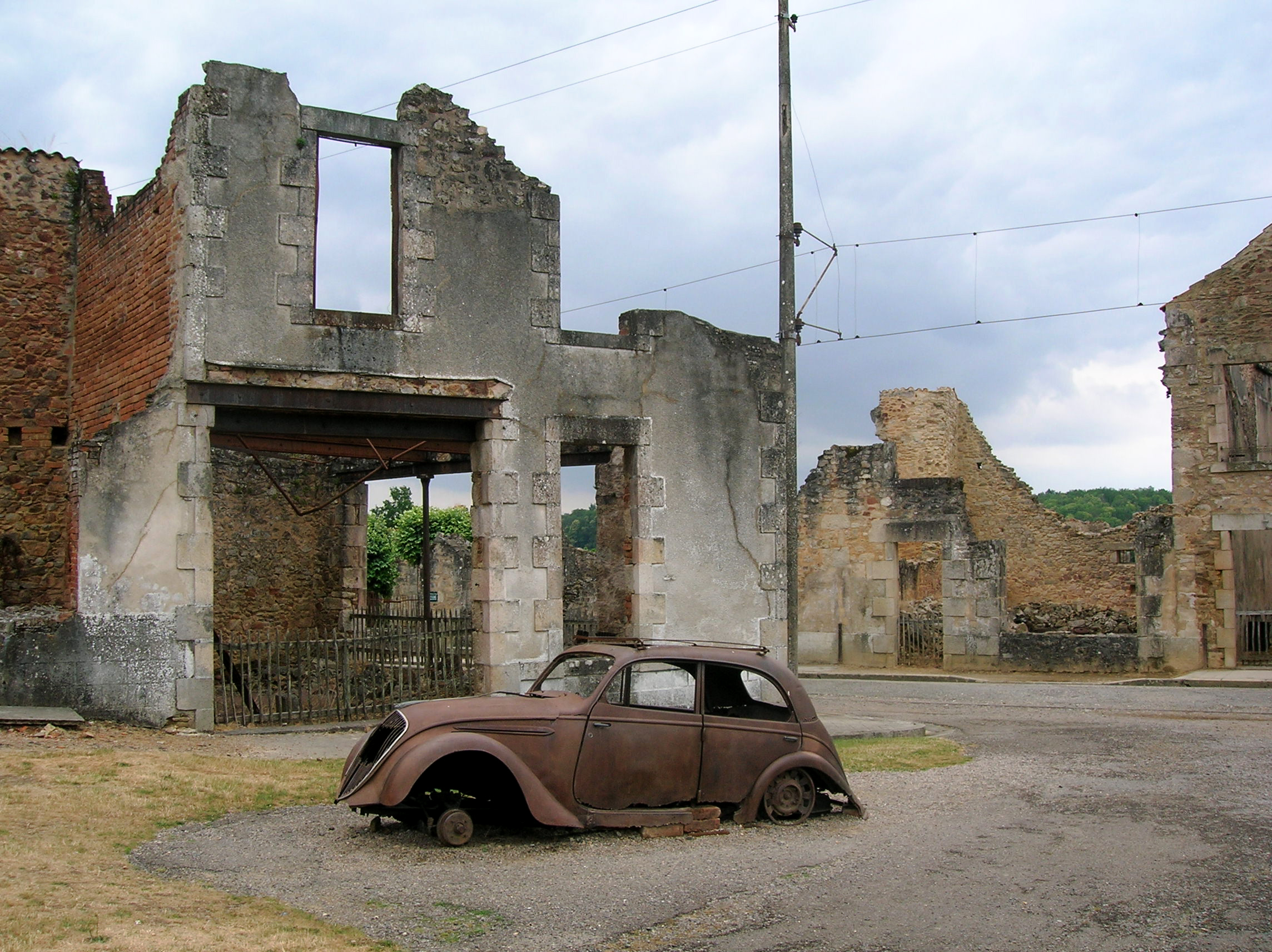
Burned out cars and buildings still litter the remains of the original village in Oradour-sur-Glane, as left by the Das Reich division.

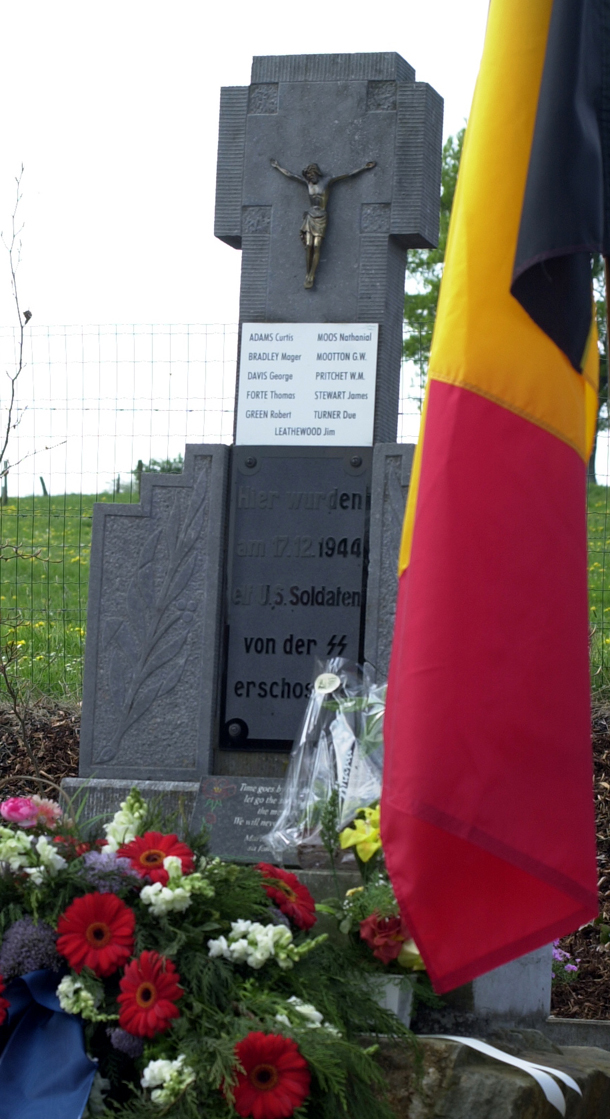
Memorial to the 'Wereth 11', a group of American POWs massacred in Belgium on 17 December 1944, during the Battle of the Bulge

- Graignes Massacre by the 17th SS Panzergrenadier Division Götz von Berlichingen, 1944, France
- Maillé massacre, also by the 17th SS Panzergrenadier Division Götz von Berlichingen, 1944, France
- Marzabotto massacre by the 16th SS Panzergrenadier Division Reichsführer-SS, 1944, Italy
- Malmedy massacre by Kampfgruppe Peiper, part of the 1st SS Panzer Division, 1944, Belgium
- Wereth 11 massacre by the 1st SS Panzer Division Leibstandarte SS Adolf Hitler, 1944, Belgium
- Ardeatine massacre by two SS officers, 1944, Italy
- Distomo massacre by the 4th SS Polizei Panzergrenadier Division, 1944, Greece
- Sant'Anna di Stazzema massacre by the 16th SS Panzergrenadier Division Reichsführer-SS, 1944, Italy
- Doli Pivski massacre by the 7th SS Volunteer Mountain Division Prinz Eugen and 13th Waffen Mountain Division of the SS Handschar (1st Croatian), 1943, Montenegro
- Ardenne Abbey massacre by the 12th SS Panzer Division Hitlerjugend, 1944, France
- Velika massacre by the 7th SS Volunteer Mountain Division Prinz Eugen and 21st Waffen Mountain Division of the SS Skanderbeg, 1944, Montenegro

The linking of the SS-VT with the SS-Totenkopfverbände (SS-TV) in 1938 raised important questions about Waffen-SS criminality, since the SS-TV were already responsible for the imprisonment, torture, and murder of Jews and other political opponents through providing the personnel for manning the concentration camps. Their leader, Theodor Eicke, who was the commandant of Dachau, inspector of the camps, and murderer of Ernst Röhm, later became the commander of the 3rd SS Totenkopf Division. With the invasion of Poland, the Totenkopfverbände troops were called on to carry out so-called "police and security measures" in rear areas. What these measures entailed is demonstrated by the record of SS Totenkopf Standarte Brandenburg. It arrived in Włocławek on 22 September 1939 and embarked on a four-day "Jewish action" that included the burning of synagogues and the execution en masse of the leaders of the Jewish community. On 29 September the Standarte travelled to Bydgoszcz to conduct an "intelligentsia action". Approximately 800 Polish civilians and what the Sicherheitsdienst (SD) termed "potential resistance leaders" were killed. Later the formation became the 3rd SS Panzer Division Totenkopf, but from the start they were among the first executors of a policy of systematic extermination.

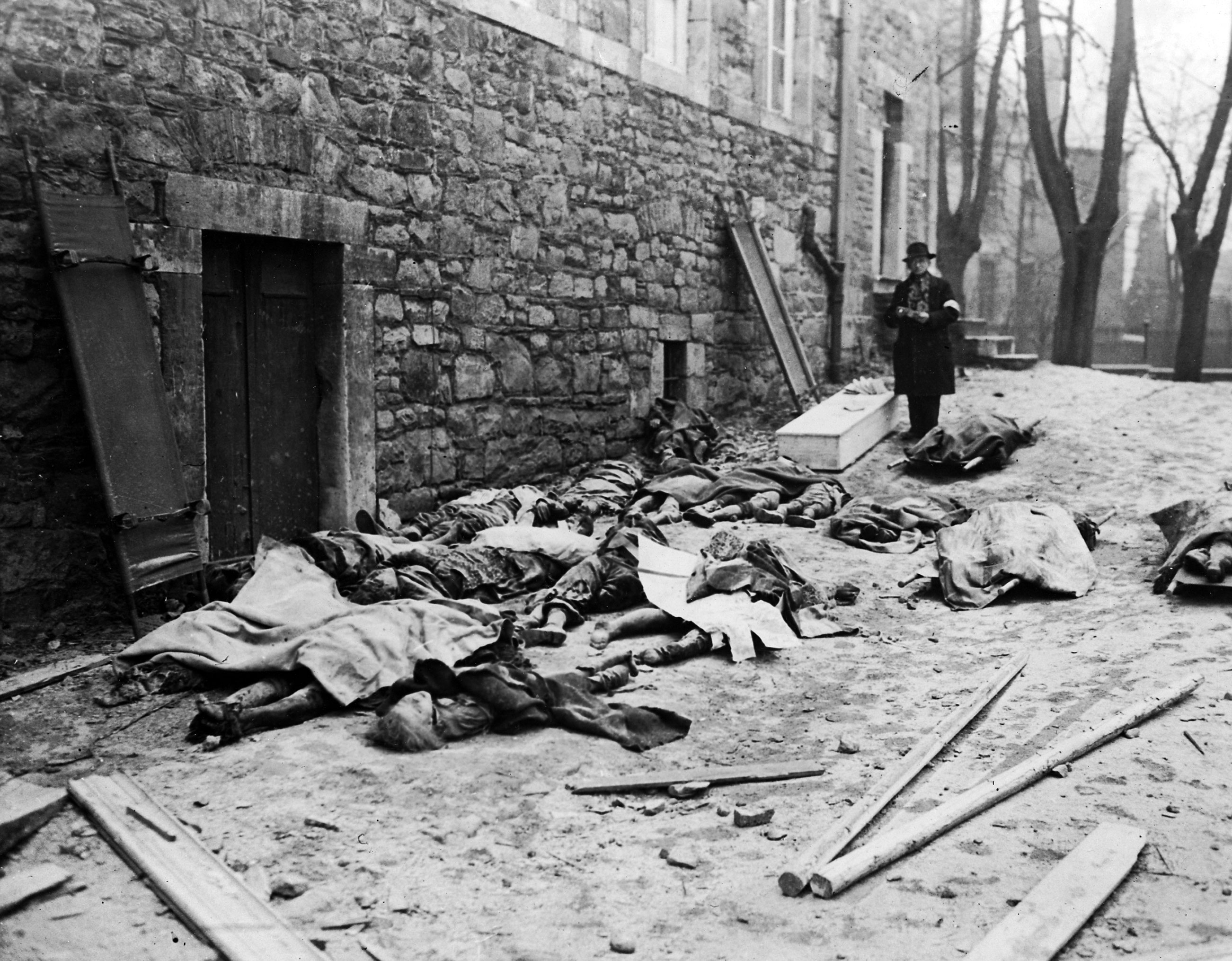
Belgian civilians killed by German units during the Battle of the Bulge

Waffen-SS formations were found guilty of war crimes, especially in the opening and closing phases of the war. In addition to documented atrocities, Waffen-SS units assisted in rounding up Eastern European Jews for deportation and utilised scorched earth tactics during rear security operations. Some Waffen-SS personnel convalesced at concentration camps, from which they were drawn, by serving guard duties. Other members of the Waffen-SS were more directly involved in genocide.

The end of the war saw a number of war crime trials, including the Malmedy massacre trial. The counts of indictment related to the massacre of more than 300 American prisoners in the vicinity of Malmedy, between 16 December 1944 and 13 January 1945, and the massacre of 100 Belgian civilians mainly in the vicinity of Stavelot.

During the Nuremberg Trials, the Waffen-SS was declared a criminal organisation for its major involvement in war crimes and for being an "integral part" of the SS. An exception was made for conscripts who were not given a choice in joining the ranks, and had not committed "such crimes". They were determined to be exempt.

In 2016, the Polish parliament classified the crimes of the 14th Grenadier Division's soldiers against the Polish population as genocide.

== Post-war ==
In the Federal Republic of Germany, the dissemination of propaganda material and the use of SS symbols are a crime and punishable by Sections 86 and 86a of the German Criminal Code.

=== Waffen-SS veterans in post-war Germany ===
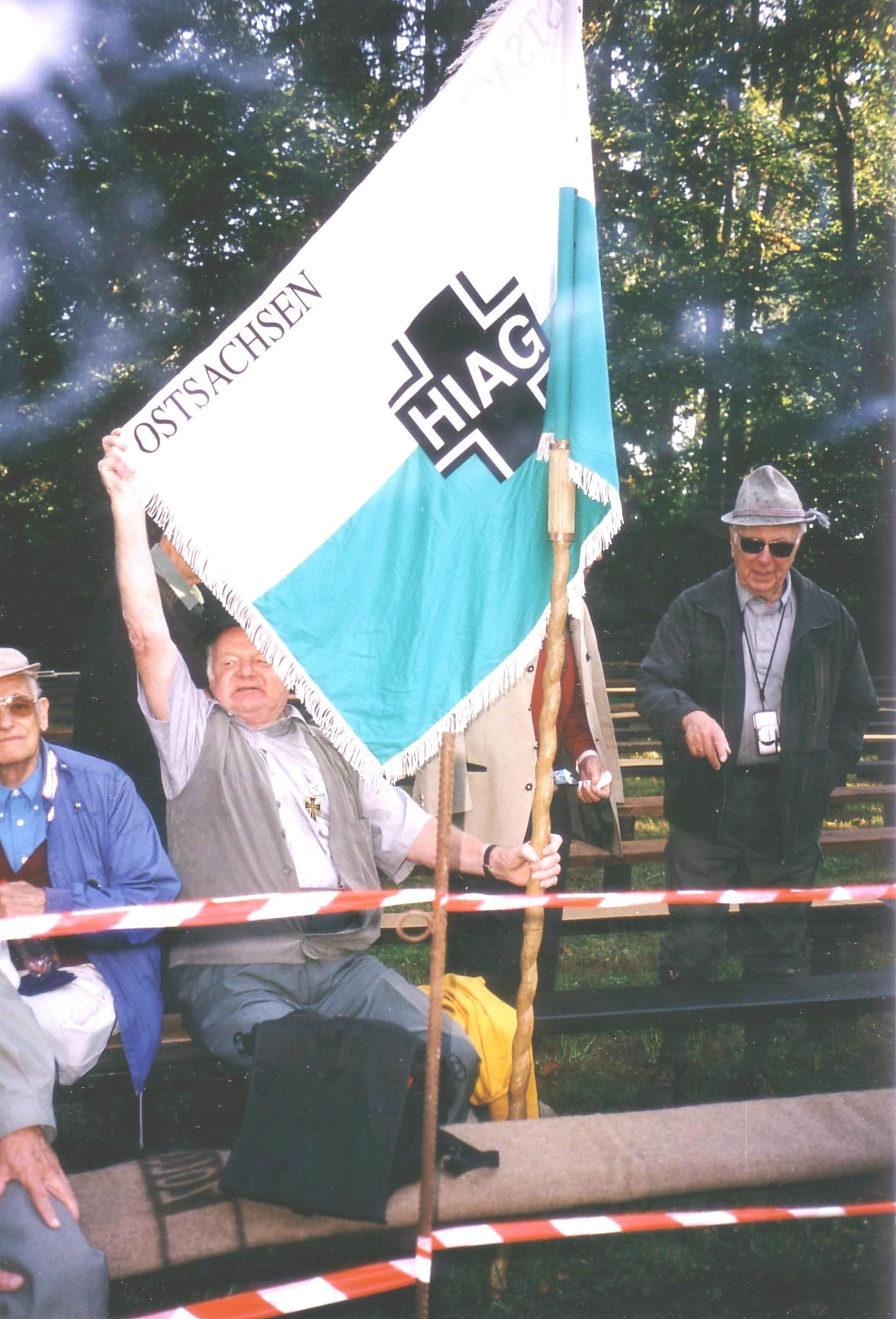
Members of the traditional group "HIAG Ostsachsen" at an Ulrichsberg gathering in 2003

Waffen-SS veterans in post-war Germany played a large role, through publications and political pressure, in the efforts to rehabilitate the reputation of the Waffen-SS, which had committed many war crimes during World War II. High ranking German politicians such as Konrad Adenauer, Franz Josef Strauss, and Kurt Schumacher courted former Waffen-SS members and their veteran organisation, HIAG, in an effort to tap into the voter potential, and helped deflect blame for war crimes onto other branches of the SS. A small number of veterans served in the new German armed forces, the Bundeswehr, something that raised national and international unease in regard to how it would affect the democratic nature of the new army.

SS-Gruppenführer Heinz Lammerding, who commanded the Das Reich Division that perpetrated the Tulle and the Oradour-sur-Glane massacres in occupied France, died in 1971, following a successful business career in West Germany. The West German government refused to extradite him to France since, as originally drafted, Article 16(2) of the German Basic Law did not permit German citizens to be extradited to foreign countries.

A historical review in Germany of the impact of Waffen-SS veterans in post-war German society continues, and a number of books on the subject have been published in recent years.

Waffen-SS veterans have received pensions (West Germany's War Victims' Assistance Act, or the Bundesversorgungsgesetz) from the German government. According to The Times of Israel, "The benefits come through the Federal Pension Act, which was passed in 1950 to support war victims, whether civilians or veterans of the Wehrmacht or Waffen-SS."

On 22 June 2005, the Italian military court in La Spezia found ten former Waffen-SS officers and NCOs living in Germany guilty of participation in the Sant'Anna di Stazzema massacre and sentenced them in absentia to life imprisonment. Extradition requests from Italy were rejected by Germany, even though the German Basic Law had been amended after 2000 to permit the extradition of German citizens to member states of the European Union.

=== HIAG lobby group ===
HIAG (German: Hilfsgemeinschaft auf Gegenseitigkeit der Angehörigen der ehemaligen Waffen-SS, literally "Mutual aid association of former Waffen-SS members") was a lobby group and a revisionist veterans' organisation founded by former high-ranking Waffen-SS personnel in West Germany in 1951. It campaigned for the legal, economic and historical rehabilitation of the Waffen-SS, using contacts with political parties to manipulate them for its purposes. Kurt Meyer, Brigadeführer of the 12th SS Division, a convicted war criminal, was HIAG's most effective spokesperson.

HIAG's historical revisionism encompassed multi-prong propaganda efforts, including periodicals, books and public speeches, alongside a publishing house that served as a platform for its publicity aims. This extensive body of work – 57 book titles and more than 50 years of monthly periodicals – have been described by historians as revisionist apologia: [a] "chorus of self-justification"; "crucible of historical revisionism"; "false" and "outrageous" claims; "most important works of [Waffen-SS] apologist literature" (in reference to books by Hausser and Steiner); and "exculpating multi-volume chronicle" (in reference to the history of the SS Division Leibstandarte).

Always in touch with its Nazi past, HIAG was a subject of significant controversy, both in West Germany and abroad, since its founding. The organisation drifted into right-wing extremism in its later history. It was disbanded in 1992 at the federal level, but local groups, along with the organisation's monthly periodical, continued to exist at least into the 2000s.

While the HIAG leadership only partially achieved the goals of legal and economic rehabilitation of Waffen-SS, falling short of their "extravagant fantasies about [Waffen-SS's] past and future", HIAG's propaganda efforts have led to a reshaping of the image of the Waffen-SS in popular culture. The results are still felt, with scholarly works being drowned out by a "veritable avalanche of titles", including amateur historical studies, memoirs, picture books, websites, and wargames.

=== Baltic states ===
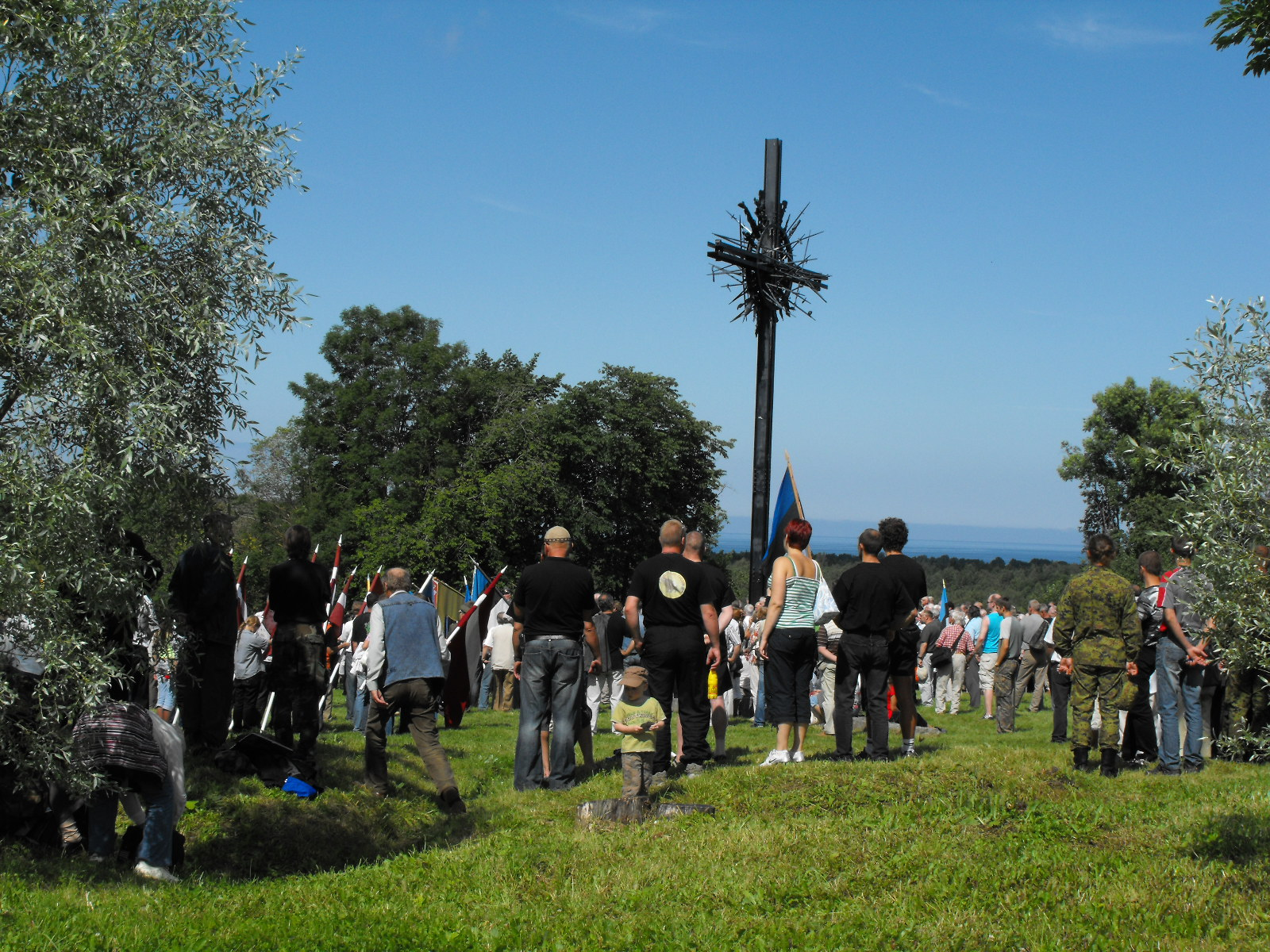
Commemoration of the Battle of Tannenberg Line in 2009

In 1990, Latvian Legion veterans started commemorating 'Legionnaire Day' (Leģionāru diena) in Latvia. On 21 February 2012, The Council of Europe's Commission against Racism and Intolerance published its report on Latvia (fourth monitoring cycle), in which it condemned commemorations of persons who fought in the Waffen-SS.

Estonian Waffen SS Grenadier Division veterans have participated in yearly commemoration of the Battle of Tannenberg Line at Sinimäed Hills in Estonia.

=== Finland ===
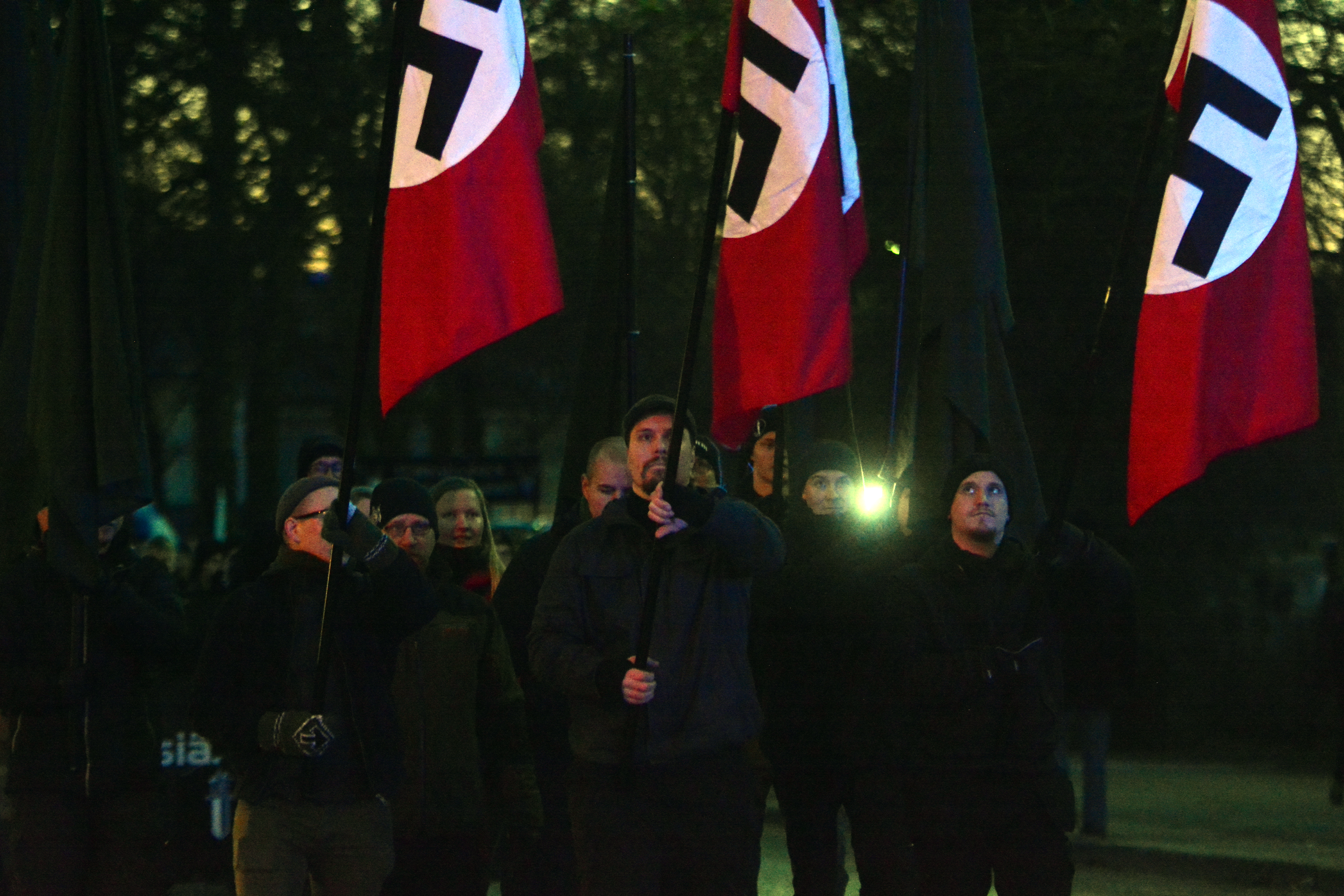
NRM Finnish independence day demonstration, 2018

Three former members of the Waffen SS served as ministers of defense; the Finnish SS Battalion officers Sulo Suorttanen and Pekka Malinen as well as Mikko Laaksonen, a soldier in the Finnish SS-Company, formed of pro-Nazi defectors.

The Nordic Resistance Movement and Finns Party, along with other nationalist organizations, organizes an annual torch march demonstration in Helsinki in memory of the Finnish SS Battalion on Finnish independence day, which ends at the Hietaniemi cemetery where participants visit the tomb of Marshal Baron Mannerheim and the monument to the Finnish SS Battalion. The event has been protested by antifascists, which has led to counterdemonstrators being violently assaulted by the NRM members who act as security. The demonstration attracted close to 3000 participants at its peak according to the estimates of the police and hundreds of officers patrol Helsinki to prevent violent clashes. By 2025, participation had dwindled to 700–800, with counter-protesters numbering 2000–3000, according to police. The march has been attended and promoted by the Finns Party, and condemned by left-wing parties, for example Green League MP Iiris Suomela characterized it as "obviously neo-Nazi" and expressed her disappointment in it being attended by such a large number of people.

In between 2019 and 2022, Finns party MP and later Minister of Economic Affairs Vilhelm Junnila made four budgetary motions in order to support Veljesapu-Perinneyhdistys, a Finnish organization that cherishes the heritage of the Finnish volunteers in the Waffen-SS. Junnila wrote in his motion, that the support would be "for the promotion of balanced historical research". According to Der Spiegel, three Finns party ministers supported a motion to provide funding for SS veterans association for a "counter-study" in response to accusations of Finnish SS men having participated in the Holocaust.

=== Ukraine ===
In 2020, the Ukrainian Supreme Court ruled that symbols of SS Division Galicia (14th Grenadier Division) do not belong to the Nazis and were not banned in the country. However, the division's insignia is classified as a Nazi and hate symbol by the non-governmental Ukrainian Helsinki Human Rights Union and Freedom House.

On 28 April, an annual march is organised in Lviv to celebrate the anniversary of the 14th Grenadier Division's foundation. On 30 April 2021, after the march was held in Kyiv, Ukrainian President Volodymyr Zelenskyy stated: "We categorically condemn any manifestation of propaganda of totalitarian regimes, in particular the National Socialist, and attempts to revise truth about World War II." The march was condemned by the German and Israeli governments.

== See also ==
- Glossary of Nazi Germany
- List of Knight's Cross recipients of the Waffen-SS
- List of SS personnel
- Ranks and insignia of the Waffen-SS
- Signal Corps of the Wehrmacht and Waffen-SS
- SS-Standarte Kurt Eggers
- SS and Police Leader
- Uniforms and insignia of the Schutzstaffel
- Waffen-SS foreign volunteers and conscripts
- Waffen-SS in popular culture
- Wewelsburg § Nazi era

== Bibliography ==
- Bartrop, Paul R.; Jacobs, Leonard, eds. (2014). "Modern Genocide". Modern Genocide: The Definitive Resource and Document Collection. Vol. 1. Santa Barbara, Ca.: ABC-CLIO. ISBN 978-1-61069-363-9.
- "Battle of the Bulge".
- Beevor, Antony (2002). Berlin: The Downfall 1945. Viking-Penguin Books. ISBN 978-0-670-03041-5.
- Beevor, Antony (2015). Ardennes 1944: Hitler's Last Gamble. London: Viking. ISBN 978-0-670-91864-5.
- Bell, Bowyer J (1966). Besieged: Seven Cities Under Siege. Chilton.
- Bercuson, David (2004) [1996]. Maple Leaf Against the Axis. Red Deer Press. ISBN 0-88995-305-8.
- Bergstrom, Christopher (2007). Kursk – The Air Battle: July 1943. Chevron/Ian Allan. ISBN 978-1-903223-88-8.
- Binkowski, Rafael; Wiegrefe, Klaus (21 October 2011). "The Brown Bluff: How Waffen SS Veterans Exploited Postwar Politics". Der Spiegel. Archived from the original on 1 December 2015.
- Bishop, Chris; Williams, Michael (2003). SS: Hell on the Western Front. St Paul, Minn: MBI Publishing. ISBN 978-0-7603-1402-9.
- Borodziej, Włodzimierz (1985). Terror i polityka: policja niemiecka a polski ruch oporu w GG 1939-1944 [Terror and politics: the German police and the Polish resistance movement in the General Government 1939–1944] (in Polish). Warsaw: Instytut Wydawniczy Pax. ISBN 83-211-0718-4.
- Borodziej, Włodzimierz (1985a). "Ruch oporu w Polsce w ś wietle tajnych akt niemieckich" [The resistance movement in Poland in the light of the German secret files]. Kierunki [Directions] (in Polish). IX (16).
- Browning, Christopher (2007). The Origins of the Final Solution: The Evolution of Nazi Jewish Policy, September 1939 – March 1942. University of Nebraska Press. ISBN 978-0-8032-5979-9.
- Butler, Rupert (2001). SS-Leibstandarte: The History of the First SS Division, 1934–45. Spellmount.
- Conot, Robert E. (1984). Justice at Nuremberg. Carrol & Graf. ISBN 9780881840322.
- Cook, Stan; Bender, Roger James (1994). Leibstandarte SS Adolf Hitler: Uniforms, Organization, & History. San Jose, CA: R. James Bender. ISBN 978-0-912138-55-8.
- Cuppers, Martin (2006). Vorreiter der Shoah, Ein Vergleich der Einsätze der beiden SS-Kavallerieregimenter im August 1941 (in German). Meidenbauer Martin Verlag. ISBN 3-89975-080-2.
- Diehl, James M. (1993). Thanks of the Fatherland: German Veterans After the Second World War. Chapel Hill: University of North Carolina Press. ISBN 978-0-8078-2077-3. Archived from the original on 23 November 2016.
- Dollinger, Hans (1967) [1965]. The Decline and Fall of Nazi Germany and Imperial Japan. New York: Bonanza. ISBN 978-0-517-01313-7.
- Duffy, Christopher (2002). Red Storm on the Reich: The Soviet March on Germany, 1945. Edison, NJ: Castle Books. ISBN 0-7858-1624-0.
- European Commission Against Racism and Intolerance (ECRI) (21 February 2012). ECRI Report on Latvia (fourth monitoring cycle) (PDF) (Report). Council of Europe. Archived from the original (PDF) on 29 June 2017.
- Ellis, L.F. (2004) [1968]. Butler, J. R. M. (ed.). Victory in the West, Volume II: The Defeat of Germany. History of the Second World War: United Kingdom Military Series. Naval & Military Press. ISBN 1-84574-059-9.
- Evans, Richard J. (2008). The Third Reich at War. New York: Penguin. ISBN 978-0-14-311671-4 – via archive.org.
- Eyre, Wayne (2006). "Operation RÖSSELSPRUNG and The Elimination of Tito, May 25, 1944: A Failure in Planning and Intelligence Support". Journal of Slavic Military Studies. 19 (2). Routledge: 343–376. doi:10.1080/13518040600697969. S2CID 144383512.
- Farmer, Sarah (1994). Oradour: Arrêt sur mémoire (in French). Paris: Calmann-Lévy. ISBN 978-2-70212-316-4.
- Fellgiebel, Walther-Peer (2000). Die Träger des Ritterkreuzes des Eisernen Kreuzes 1939–1945. Wölfersheim-Berstadt, Germany: Podzun-Pallas. ISBN 3-7909-0284-5.
- Fey, William (2003). Armor Battles of the Waffen-SS. Stackpole. ISBN 978-0-8117-2905-5.
- Fischer, Thomas (2008). Soldiers of the Leibstandarte. J.J. Fedorowicz Publishing. ISBN 978-0-921991-91-5.
- Flaherty, T. H. (2004) [1988]. The Third Reich: The SS. Time-Life. ISBN 1-84447-073-3.
- Forbes, Robert (2010) [2006]. For Europe: The French Volunteers of the Waffen-SS. Stackpole Books. ISBN 978-0-8117-3581-0.
- Fritz, Stephen (2011). Ostkrieg: Hitler's War of Extermination in the East. Lexington: The University Press of Kentucky. ISBN 978-0-81313-416-1.
- "Germany struggles to stop Nazi war payment suspicions". The Local. 28 February 2019.
- Gerwarth, Robert; Böhler, Jochen (2016). The Waffen-SS: A European History. Oxford University Press. ISBN 978-0-19250-782-2.
- Gosztony, Peter (1978). Endkampf an der Donau 1944/45 (in German). Vienna: Molden Taschenbuch Verlag. ISBN 3-217-05126-2.
- Hannes, Heer; Naumann, Klaus (2000). War of Extermination: The German Military in World War II 1941–1944. Berghahn. ISBN 1-57181-232-6.
- Harclerode, Peter (2005). Wings Of War – Airborne Warfare 1918–1945. Weidenfeld & Nicolson. ISBN 978-0-304-36730-6.
- Harman, Nicholas (1980). Dunkirk: The Necessary Myth. Hodder and Stoughton. ISBN 0-340-24299-X.
- Hastings, Max (2006) [1985]. Overlord: D-Day and the Battle for Normandy. Vintage. ISBN 0-307-27571-X.
- Jackson, Julian (2001). The Fall of France: The Nazi Invasion of 1940. Oxford University Press. ISBN 0-19-280550-9.
- Jarymowycz, Roman (2001). Tank Tactics: From Normandy to Lorraine. Lynne Rienner. ISBN 1-55587-950-0.
- Kajosevic, Samir (28 July 2021). "'Genocide' Controversy Erupts over WWII Massacres in Montenegro". Balkan Investigative Reporting Network.
- Kay, Alex J. (2021). Empire of Destruction: A History of Nazi Mass Killing. New Haven and London: Yale University Press. ISBN 978-0-300-26253-7.
- Kershaw, Ian (2008). Hitler: A Biography. New York: W. W. Norton & Company. ISBN 978-0-393-06757-6.
- Kirchmayer, Jerzy (1978). Powstanie Warszawskie (in Polish). Książka i Wiedza. ISBN 83-05-11080-X.
- Król, Eugeniusz C. (2006). Polska i Polacy w propagandzie narodowego socjalizmu w Niemczech 1919–1945 [Poland and Poles in the propaganda of National Socialism in Germany 1919-1945] (in Polish). Warsaw: Instytut Studiów Politycznych Polskiej Akademii Nauk. ISBN 978-83-7399-019-7.
- Laar, Mart (2005). "Battles in Estonia in 1944". Estonia in World War II. Tallinn: Grenamder. pp. 32–59. ISBN 9949-411-93-9.
- Langer, Howard J.; Rudowski, Marek (2008). Księga najważniejszych postaci II wojny światowej (in Polish). Warsaw: Bellona. ISBN 978-83-11-11111-0.
- Large, David C. (1987). "Reckoning without the Past: The HIAG of the Waffen-SS and the Politics of Rehabilitation in the Bonn Republic, 1950–1961". The Journal of Modern History. 59 (1). University of Chicago Press: 79–113. doi:10.1086/243161. JSTOR 1880378. S2CID 144592069.
- Langbein, Hermann (2005) [First published in German in 1972]. People in Auschwitz. Translated by Zohn, Harry. Chapel Hill: University of North Carolina Press in connection with the United States Holocaust Memorial Museum. ISBN 978-0-8078-6363-3 – via Google Books.
- Latimer, Jon (2001). "World War II: 12th SS Hitlerjugend Panzer Division Fought in Normandy". World War II (July). Archived from the original on 3 January 2020.
- Levenda, Peter (2014). The Hitler Legacy: The Nazi Cult in Diaspora: How it was Organized, How it was Funded, and Why it Remains a Threat to Global Security in the Age of Terrorism. Lake Worth, Fla.: Ibis Press. ISBN 978-0-89254-210-9.
- Littlejohn, David (1987). Foreign Legions of the Third Reich Vol. 1 Norway, Denmark, France. Bender Publishing. ISBN 978-0912138176.
- Longerich, Peter (2012). Heinrich Himmler: A Life. Oxford; New York: Oxford University Press. ISBN 978-0-19-959232-6.
- MacKenzie, S.P. (1997). Revolutionary Armies in the Modern Era: A Revisionist Approach. New York: Routledge. ISBN 9780415096904.
- Madajczyk, Czesław (1972). Polityka III Rzeszy w okupowanej Polsce (in Polish). Warsaw: Państwowe Wydawnictwo Naukowe.
- Margry, Karel (2001). The Four Battles for Kharkiv. Battle of Britain International. OCLC 254320761.
- Marrus, Michael R. (1989). The Nazi Holocaust. Part 3: The "Final Solution": The Implementation of Mass Murder (Vol.2). Berlin: De Gruyter. ISBN 978-0-88736-255-2.
- McDonald, Gabrielle Kirk; Swaak-Goldman, Olivia (2000). Substantive and Procedural Aspects of International Criminal Law: The Experience of International and National Courts: Materials. Brill Publishers. ISBN 90-411-1134-4.
- McGilvray, Evan (2005). The Black Devil's March – A Doomed Odyssey: The 1st Polish Armoured Division 1939–1945. Helion & Company. ISBN 1-874622-42-6.
- McMahon, Barbara (22 June 2005). "10 former Nazis convicted of Tuscan massacre". The Guardian.
- McNab, Chris (2009). The SS: 1923–1945. Amber Books. ISBN 978-1-906626-49-5.
- McNab, Chris (2013). Hitler's Elite: The SS 1939–45. Osprey. ISBN 978-1-78200-088-4.
- Miller, Michael (2006). Leaders of the SS and German Police, Vol. 1. San Jose, CA: R. James Bender. ISBN 978-93-297-0037-2.
- Mitcham, Samuel (2001). The Panzer Legions: A Guide to the German Army Tank Divisions of World War II and Their Commanders. Greenwood. ISBN 0-313-31640-6.
- Mitcham, Samuel (2007). German Order of Battle, Volume 3. Stackpole Books. ISBN 978-0-8117-3438-7.
- Müller, Rolf-Dieter; Ueberschär, Gerd R. (1997). Hitler's War in the East, 1941-1945: A Critical Assessment. Berghahn Books. ISBN 978-1-57181-068-7.
- Murray, Williamson; Millett, Allan R. (2001). A War To Be Won: Fighting the Second World War. Harvard University Press. ISBN 978-0-67400-680-5.
- Molt, Matthias (2007). on der Wehrmacht zur Bundeswehr personelle Kontinuität und Diskontinuität beim Aufbau der deutschen Streitkräfte 1955–1966 [From the Wehrmacht to the Bundeswehr – Continuity and dis-continuity of personnel in the formation of the German armed forces] (in German). Heidelberg: Ruprecht-Karls-Universität Heidelberg.
- Nash, Douglas E. (2002). Hell's Gate: The Battle of the Cherkassy Pocket, January–February 1944. Southbury, Connecticut: RZM Publishing. ISBN 0-9657584-3-5.
- Staff (24 May 1945). "Heinrich Himmler Kills Himself in British Prison". Bend Bulletin.
- War Crimes Office (1948). "Nazi Crimes on Trial: The Dachau Trials. Trials by U.S. Army Courts in Europe 1945 – 1948". U.S. Army Trial Reviews and Recommendations. United States War Department. Archived from the original on 25 September 2017.
- Neitzel, Sönke; Welzer, Harald (2012). Soldaten: On Fighting, Killing and Dying. Simon and Schuster. ISBN 978-1-84983-949-5.
- "Operation Nordwind in the Low Vosges 1–7 January 1945". Archived from the original on 17 September 2018.
- Overmans, Rűdiger (2000). Deutsche militärische Verluste im Zweiten Weltkrieg (in German). Munich: Oldenbourg. ISBN 3-486-56531-1.
- Parker, Danny S. (2014). Hitler's Warrior: The Life and Wars of SS Colonel Jochen Peiper. Boston: Da Capo Press. ISBN 978-0-306-82154-7.
- Picaper, Jean-Paul (2014). Les Ombres d'Oradour: 10 Juin 1944 [The Shadows of Oradour: 10 June 1944] (in French). Paris: Éditions l'Archipel. ISBN 978-2-8098-1467-5.
- Pieper, Henning (2015). Fegelein's Horsemen and Genocidal Warfare: The SS Cavalry Brigade in the Soviet Union. Houndmills, Basingstoke, Hampshire: Palgrave Macmillan. ISBN 978-1-137-45631-1.
- "Probe into Nazi massacre at Sant'Anna di Stazzema, Italy, dropped". BBC News. 1 October 2012.
- Raus, Erhard (2005). Panzer Operations. The Eastern Front Memoir of General Raus, 1941–1945. DeCapo.
- Reitlinger, Gerald (1989). The SS: Alibi of a Nation, 1922–1945. Da Capo. ISBN 978-0-306-80351-2.
- "Remembering the invisible soldiers of the Battle of the Bulge". U.S. Wereth Memorial. 2012.
- Reynolds, Michael (1997). Steel Inferno: I SS Panzer Corps in Normandy. Spellmount. ISBN 1-873376-90-1.
- Reynolds, Michael (February 2003). "Massacre at Malmédy During the Battle of the Bulge". World War II Magazine.
- "The Sant'Anna di Stazzema Massacre (August 1944)". Jewish Virtual Library.
- Rossino, Alexander B. (2003). Hitler Strikes Poland: Blitzkrieg, Ideology, and Atrocity. Lawrence, Kansas: University Press of Kansas. ISBN 0-7006-1234-3.
- Schramm, Percy E. (1982). Kriegstagebuch des Oberkommandos der Wehrmacht 1944–1945 Teilband II (in German). Herrsching: Manfred Pawlak.
- Schulte, Jan Erik; Wildt, Michael, eds. (September 2018). Die SS nach 1945: Entschuldungsnarrative, populäre Mythen, europäische Erinnerungsdiskurse [The post-1945 SS: Debt narratives, popular myths, European commemorative discourses]. Berichte und Studien (in German). Vol. 76. Göttingen: V&R unipress. ISBN 978-3847108207. [ p. 47 ]
  "another source" (PDF) – via Humboldt University of Berlin.
- Seaton, Albert (1971). The Russo-German War, 1941–45. New York: Praeger Publishers. ISBN 978-0-21376-478-4.
- Smelser, Ronald; Davies, Edward J. (2008). The Myth of the Eastern Front: The Nazi-Soviet War in American Popular Culture. New York: Cambridge University Press. ISBN 978-0-521-83365-3.
- Spajić, Hrvoje (2010). Waffen-SS: Mračne sile zločinačke politike - Vojnici nacionalsocijalizma 1933–45 [Waffen-SS: The Dark Forces of Criminal Politics – Soldiers of National Socialism 1933–45] (in Croatian). Zagreb: Naklada Stih.
- Stackelberg, Roderick (2002). Hitler's Germany: Origins, Interpretations, Legacies. London; New York: Taylor & Francis. ISBN 978-0-203-00541-5.
- Stein, George H. (2002) [1966]. The Waffen-SS: Hitler's Elite Guard at War 1939–1945. Cerberus Publishing. ISBN 978-1841451008.
- Stein, George H. (1984) [1966]. The Waffen SS: Hitler's Elite Guard at War, 1939-1945. Cornell University Press. ISBN 0-8014-9275-0.
- Stroop, Jürgen (1943). "The Stroop Report: The Warsaw Ghetto Is No More". Jewish Virtual Library.
- Sydnor, Charles W. Jr. (1990) [1977]. Soldiers of Destruction: The SS Death's Head Division, 1933–1945. Princeton, N.J.: Princeton University Press. ISBN 978-0-691-00853-0.
- Sydnor, Charles W. Jr. (1973). "The History of the SS Totenkopfdivision and the Postwar Mythology of the Waffen SS". Central European History. 6 (4). Cambridge University Press: 339–362. doi:10.1017/S0008938900000960. S2CID 144835004.
- Tauber, Kurt (1967). Beyond Eagle and Swastika: German Nationalism Since 1945, Volume I. Middletown, Conn.: Wesleyan University Press.
- Tessin, Georg (1973). Verbände und Truppen der deutschen Wehrmacht und Waffen-SS 1939–1945, Volumes II and III (in German). Biblio Verlag.
- Tessin, Georg (1977). Die Waffengattungen – Gesamtübersicht. Verbände und Truppen der deutschen Wehrmacht und Waffen SS im Zweiten Weltkrieg 1939–1945 (in German). Vol. 1. Osnabrück: Biblio.
- Tessin, Georg (1966). Verbände und Truppen der deutschen Wehrmacht und Waffen SS im Zweiten Weltkrieg 1939–1945: Die Landstreitkräfte 1–5 (in German). Vol. 2. Frankfurt am Main: Mittler.
- Tessin, Georg (1970). Die Landstreitkräfte 15–30. Verbände und Truppen der deutschen Wehrmacht und Waffen SS im Zweiten Weltkrieg 1939–1945 (in German). Vol. 4. Leipzig: Mittler.
- Thomson, Mike (23 September 2004). "Hitler's secret Indian army". BBC News.
- "Jewish Uprisings in Ghettos and Camps, 1941–1944: Resistance in Ghettos". United States Holocaust Memorial Museum.
- Ustinow, D. F (1981). Geschichte des zweiten Weltkrieges 1939–1945 (in German). Vol. X. Berlin: Militärverlag der Deutschen Demokratischen Republik.
- Vahtla, Aili, ed. (31 July 2018). "Politicians condemn Russian Embassy criticism of tribute to WWII battle". Eesti Rahvusringhääling.
- Wardzyńska, Maria (2009). Był rok 1939. Operacja niemieckiej policji bezpieczeństwa w Polsce. Intelligenzaktion [The year was 1939. Operation of German security police in Poland. Intelligenzaktion] (PDF) (in Polish). Institute of National Remembrance, IPN (Portal edukacyjny Instytutu Pamięci Narodowej). ISBN 978-83-7629-063-8. Archived from the original (PDF) on 29 November 2014.
- Weale, Adrian (2010). The SS: A New History. Little, Brown. ISBN 978-1-4087-0304-5.
- Weale, Adrian (2012). Army of Evil: A History of the SS. New York: Caliber Printing. ISBN 978-0-451-23791-0.
- Wegner, Bernd (1990). The Waffen-SS: Organization, Ideology and Function. Blackwell. ISBN 0-631-14073-5.
- Weinberg, Gerhard (1994). A World at Arms: A Global History of World War II. Cambridge; New York: Cambridge University Press. ISBN 0-521-44317-2.
- Werther, Steffen; Hurd, Madeleine (2014). "Go East Old Man: The Ritual Spaces of SS Veteran's Memory Work" (PDF). Culture Unbound. Journal of Current Cultural Research. 6 (2): 327–359. doi:10.3384/cu.2000.1525.146327. Archived from the original (PDF) on 2 January 2016.
- Westemeier, Jens (2007). Joachim Peiper: A Biography of Himmler's SS Commander. Schiffer Publishing. ISBN 978-0-7643-2659-2.
- Wiederschein, Harald (21 July 2015). "Mythos Waffen-SS: Von wegen "blonde Götter" - Hitlers Elitetruppen sind bis heute überschätzt" [Myth of the Waffen-SS: Because of the "blond gods" – Hitler's elite troops are still overrated]. Focus (in German).
- Wienand, Christiane (2015). Returning Memories: Former Prisoners of War in Divided and Reunited Germany. Rochester, N.Y: Camden House. ISBN 978-1571139047.
- Wilke, Karsten (2011). Die "Hilfsgemeinschaft auf Gegenseitigkeit" (HIAG) 1950–1990: Veteranen der Waffen-SS in der Bundesrepublik [HIAG 1950–1990: Waffen-SS veterans in the Federal Republic] (in German). Paderborn: Schoeningh Ferdinand GmbH. ISBN 978-3-506-77235-0.
- Williamson, Gordon; Andrew, Stephan (2004). The Waffen-SS (4): 24. To 38. Divisions, & Volunteer Legions. Osprey. ISBN 1-84176-589-9.
- Windrow, Martin; Burn, Cristopher (1992). The Waffen-SS, Edition 2. Osprey. ISBN 0-85045-425-5.
- Wroniszewski, Józef (1970). Ochota 1944 (in Polish). Warsaw: Wydawnictwo Ministerstwa Obrony Narodowej.
- Zentner, Christian; Bedürftig, Friedemann (1997) [1991]. The Encyclopedia of the Third Reich. New York: Da Capo Press. ISBN 978-0-3068079-3-0.
- Zetterling, Niklas; Frankson, Anders (2008). The Korsun Pocket: The Encirclement and Breakout of a German Army in the East, 1944. Philadelphia: Casemate. ISBN 978-1-932033-88-5.
- Ziemke, Earl F. (1968). Stalingrad to Berlin: The German Defeat in the East. Washington: Office of the Chief of Military History – U.S. Army. ASIN B002E5VBSE.
- Zimmermann, Elizabeth (21 January 2004). "Former SS member faces trial for war crimes in the Netherlands". World Socialist Web Site. International Committee of the Fourth International.
- Zwack, Peter (1999). "World War II: Siege of Budapest". Quarterly Journal of Military History. Archived from the original on 3 January 2020.
- Antonijević, Nenad (2009). "Albanski Zlocini nad Srbima na Kosovu i Metohiji u Drugom Svetskom Ratu" (PDF) (in Serbian). Muzej žrtava genocida. Archived from the original (PDF) on 10 August 2016.
- Zdravkovski, Aleksander (2022). The Sandžak of Novi Pazar: Millets, Nations, Empires. Rowman & Littlefield. ISBN 9781793641816.
