= List of Knight's Cross of the Iron Cross with Oak Leaves, Swords or Diamonds recipients of the Waffen-SS =

The Knight's Cross of the Iron Cross (German language: Ritterkreuz des Eisernen Kreuzes) and its variants were the highest military awards in Nazi Germany. During or shortly after World War II, 457 German servicemen of the Waffen-SS, including volunteers from Belgium, Croatia, Denmark, Estonia, France, Hungary, Latvia, Netherlands, and Norway, received the Knight's Cross of the Iron Cross. Of these, 411 presentations were formally made and evidence of the award is still available in the German Federal Archives. One recipient, Hermann Fegelein, was court-martialed and executed on 29 April 1945. According to German law, he was deprived of rank and all awards previously. Fegelein must therefore be considered a de facto but not de jure recipient. A further 46 Knight's Cross, nine Knight's Cross with Oak Leaves, and four Knight's Cross with Oak Leaves and Swords recipients are either lacking the evidence to sustain their listings or received the award under questionable legal terms. However, all of them were accepted by the Association of Knight's Cross Recipients (Ordensgemeinschaft der Ritterkreuzträger des Eisernen Kreuzes e.V.) as legitimate recipients.

== Recipients ==
Recipients are grouped by grades of the Knight's Cross and listed alphabetically for the lowest grade and chronologically by the numbering paradigm for the higher grades.

This along with the * (asterisk) indicates that the Knight's Cross was awarded posthumously.
This along with the ? (question mark) indicates that historian Veit Scherzer has expressed doubt regarding the veracity and formal correctness of the listing.

=== Knight's Cross with Oak Leaves, Swords and Diamonds ===
The Knight's Cross with Oak Leaves, Swords, and Diamonds is based on the enactment Reichsgesetzblatt I S. 613 of 28 September 1941 to reward those servicemen who had already been awarded the Oak Leaves with Swords to the Knight's Cross of the Iron Cross. Ultimately, it would be awarded to twenty-seven German soldiers, sailors and airmen, ranging from young fighter pilots to field marshals. Two recipients were members of the Waffen-SS. The list is initially sorted by the chronological number assigned to the recipient.

Number	Name	Rank	Unit	Date of award	Notes	Picture
12	Herbert-Otto Gille	SS-Gruppenführer and Generalleutnant of the Waffen-SS	commander of 5. SS-Panzergrenadier-Division "Wiking"	19 April 1944		A black-and-white photograph of a man sitting at a desk, wearing a military uniform and neck order, in shape of an Iron Cross.
16	Josef Dietrich	SS-Oberstgruppenführer	commander of I. SS-Panzerkorps "Leibstandarte SS Adolf Hitler"	6 August 1944		A black-and-white photograph of a man in semi profile wearing a military uniform and neck order, in shape of an Iron Cross. He has short, thinning hair and a determined facial expression.

=== Knight's Cross with Oak Leaves and Swords ===
The Knight's Cross with Oak Leaves and Swords is also based on the enactment Reichsgesetzblatt I S. 613 of 28 September 1941 to reward those servicemen who had already been awarded the Oak Leaves to the Knight's Cross of the Iron Cross. The list is initially sorted by the chronological number assigned to the recipient.

Number	Name	Rank	Unit	Date of award	Notes	Picture
26	Josef Dietrich	SS-Obergruppenführer	SS-Panzergrenadier-Division "Leibstandarte SS Adolf Hitler"	14 March 1943	Awarded 16th Diamonds 6 August 1944	A black-and-white photograph of a man in semi profile wearing a military uniform, peaked cap and neck order, in shape of an Iron Cross. He has a determined facial expression.
39	August Dieckmann	SS-Obersturmbannführer	SS-Panzergrenadier-Regiment 10	10 October 1943*	Killed in action 10 October 1943	
47	Herbert-Otto Gille	SS-Gruppenführer	SS-Panzergrenadier Division "Wiking"	20 February 1944	Awarded 12th Diamonds 19 April 1944	A black-and-white photograph of a man sitting at a desk, wearing a military uniform and neck order, in shape of an Iron Cross.
56	Hinrich Schuldt	SS-Oberführer	2. lett. SS-Freiwillige-Brigade	25 March 1944*	Killed in action 15 March 1944	
65	Hermann Priess	SS-Brigadeführer	3. SS-Panzer Division	24 April 1944		
71	Michael Wittmann	SS-Hauptsturmführer	schwere SS-Panzer-Abteilung 101	22 June 1944	Killed in action 8 August 1944	A black-and-white photograph of a man wearing a black military uniform, peaked cap and a neck order in shape of an Iron Cross. His cap has an emblem in shape of a human skull and crossed bones.
77	Hans Dorr	SS-Sturmbannführer	SS-Panzergrenadier-Regiment 9	9 July 1944	Died of wounds 17 April 1945	
83	Hermann Fegelein? (Note: Hermann Fegelein was sentenced to death by Hitler and executed by SS General Johann Rattenhuber's RSD on 28 April 1945 after a court martial led by SS-Brigadeführer and Generalmajor of the Waffen-SS Wilhelm Mohnke. The sentence was carried out the same day. The death sentence resulted in the loss of all orders and honorary signs.)	SS-Gruppenführer	8. SS-Freiwillige-Kavallerie-Division "Florian Geyer"	30 July 1944	Executed 29 April 1945	A black-and-white photograph of a man in semi profile wearing a military uniform and a neck order in shape of an Iron Cross.
85	Fritz von Scholz Edler von Rarancze	SS-Gruppenführer	11. SS-Freiwillige-Panzergrenadier Division	8 August 1944*	Died of wounds 28 July 1944	
86	Felix Steiner	SS-Obergruppenführer	III. (germanisches) SS-Panzerkorps	10 August 1944		A man wearing a military uniform and neck order, in the shape of a cross. His hair is combed to the back.
90	Paul Hausser	SS-Oberstgruppenführer	7. Armee	28 August 1944		
91	Kurt Meyer	SS-Standartenführer	12. SS-Panzer-Division	27 August 1944		A black-and-white photograph of a smiling man wearing a military uniform, peaked cap and neck order, in shape of an Iron Cross.
94	Theodor Wisch	SS-Brigadeführer	1. SS-Panzer Division "Leibstandarte SS Adolf Hitler"	30 August 1944		
95	Otto Baum	SS-Standartenführer	2. SS-Panzer Division	2 September 1944		
116	Heinz Harmel	SS-Brigadeführer	10. SS-Panzer Division	15 December 1944		
119	Joachim Peiper	SS-Obersturmbannführer	SS-Panzer-Regiment 1	11 January 1945		A man wearing a military uniform, peaked cap and a neck order in the shape of a cross. His cap has an emblem in shape of a human skull and crossed bones.
120	Walter Krüger	SS-Obergruppenführer	VI. Waffen-Armeekorps der SS	11 January 1945	Suicide 22 May 1945 (Note: Walter Krüger's date of death is inconclusive. According to Florian Berger date of death is 20 May 1945, Walther-Per Fellgiebel states 8 May 1945 and Veit Scherzer presents 22 May 1945.)	
129	Helmut Dörner	SS-Oberführer	4. SS-Polizei Panzergrenadier Division	1 February 1945	Killed in action 11 February 1945	
138	Otto Kumm	SS-Brigadeführer	7. SS-Freiwillige-Gebirgs-Division	17 Mar 1945		
140	Georg Bochmann	SS-Standartenführer	18. SS-Freiwillige-Panzergrenadier-Division "Horst Wessel"	26 March 1945		A black-and-white photograph of a man wearing a military uniform and neck order in shape of an Iron Cross. His hair is combed back and his facial expression is determined.
150	Otto Weidinger? (Note: No evidence of the award can be found in the German Federal Archives. The award was unlawfully presented by SS-Oberstgruppenführer Sepp Dietrich. The date is taken from the announcement made by the 6. SS-Panzerarmee. The sequential number "150" was assigned by the Association of Knight's Cross Recipients (AKCR). Weidinger was member of the AKCR.)	SS-Obersturmbannführer	SS-Panzergrenadier-Regiment 4 "Der Führer"	6 May 1945		
151	Günther-Eberhardt Wisliceny? (Note: No evidence of the award can be found in the German Federal Archives. The award was unlawfully presented by SS-Oberstgruppenführer Sepp Dietrich. The date is taken from the announcement made by the 6. SS-Panzerarmee. The sequential number "151" was assigned by the Association of Knight's Cross Recipients (AKCR). Wisliceny was member of the AKCR.)	SS-Obersturmbannführer	SS-Panzergrenadier-Regiment 3 "Deutschland"	6 May 1945		A black-and-white photograph of a man in semi profile wearing a military uniform. His hair is combed back and his facial expression is determined.
152	Sylvester Stadler? (Note: No evidence of the award can be found in the German Federal Archives, also not mentioned by the order commission of the Association of Knight's Cross Recipients (AKCR). According to Fellgiebel, the award was presented by SS-Oberstgruppenführer Sepp Dietrich, which would make it an unlawful presentation. Fellgiebel is referring to Hermann Buch, the former IIa (personnel administration) of the 2. SS-Division "Das Reich", and Wilhelm Kment, the adjutant of Heinrich Himmler and liaison officer to the Heerespersonalamt (HPA—Army Staff Office), as sources. Buch reported on 25 June 2004 that he hadn't to do anything with this case. Stadler himself claimed that Dietrich proposed him on 22 March 1945, even though the 9. SS-Panzer-Division "Hohenstaufen" was not subordinated to the 6. SS-Panzerarmee. The sequential number "152" was assigned by the AKCR. The date might have been taken from Ernst-Günther Krätschmer.)	SS-Oberführer	9. SS-Panzer Division	6 May 1945		A black-and-white photograph of a man wearing a military uniform and coat, peaked cap and a neck order in shape of an Iron Cross. His cap has an emblem in shape of a human skull and crossed bones.
153	Wilhelm Bittrich? (Note: No evidence of the award can be found in the German Federal Archives. The award was unlawfully presented by SS-Oberstgruppenführer Sepp Dietrich. The date is taken from the announcement made by the 6. SS-Panzerarmee. The sequential number "153" was assigned by the Association of Knight's Cross Recipients (AKCR). Bittrich was member of the AKCR.)	SS-Obergruppenführer	II. SS-Panzerkorps	6 May 1945		

=== Knight's Cross with Oak Leaves ===
The Knight's Cross with Oak Leaves was based on the enactment Reichsgesetzblatt I S. 849 of 3 June 1940. The last officially announced number for the Oak Leaves was 843. Higher numbers are unofficial and therefore denoted in brackets. The list is initially sorted by the chronological number assigned to the recipient.

Number	Name	Rank	Unit	Date of award	Notes	Picture
41	Josef Dietrich	SS-Obergruppenführer	SS-Division "Leibstandarte SS Adolf Hitler" (mot.)	31 December 1941	Awarded 26th Swords 14 March 1943; 16th Diamonds 6 August 1944	A black-and-white photograph of a man in semi profile wearing a military uniform and neck order, in shape of an Iron Cross. He has short, thinning hair and a determined facial expression.
88	Theodor Eicke	SS-Obergruppenführer	SS-Division "Totenkopf"	20 April 1942	Killed in action 26 February 1943	A black-and-white photograph of a man in semi profile wearing a military uniform and neck order, in shape of an Iron Cross. His dark hair is combed to the back. He has determined facial expression.
91	Alfred Wünnenberg	SS-Brigadeführer	SS-Polizei-Division	23 April 1942		A black-and-white photograph of a man wearing a military uniform and a neck order in shape of an Iron Cross.
157	Hermann Fegelein?	SS-Oberführer	SS-Kampfgruppe "Fegelein"	22 December 1942	Awarded 83rd Swords 30 July 1944	
159	Felix Steiner	SS-Gruppenführer	5. SS-Panzergrenadier-Division	23 December 1942	Awarded 86th Swords 10 August 1944	A man wearing a military uniform and neck order, in the shape of a cross. His hair is combed to the back.
195	Kurt Meyer	SS-Obersturmbannführer	SS-Aufklärungs-Abteilung "Leibstandarte SS Adolf Hitler"	23 February 1943	Awarded 91st Swords 27 August 1944	A black-and-white photograph of a smiling man wearing a military uniform, peaked cap and neck order, in shape of an Iron Cross.
200	Fritz Witt	SS-Standartenführer	SS-Panzergrenadier-Regiment 1 "Leibstandarte SS Adolf Hitler"	1 March 1943	Killed in action 14 June 1944	
220	Hinrich Schuldt	SS-Standartenführer	SS Brigade Schuldt	2 April 1943	Awarded 56th Swords 25 March 1944	
221	Otto Kumm	SS-Obersturmbannführer	SS-Panzergrenadier-Regiment "Der Führer"	6 April 1943	Awarded 138th Swords 17 March 1945	
233	August Dieckmann	SS-Sturmbannführer	I./SS-Regiment "Germania"	16 April 1943	Awarded 39th Swords 10 October 1943	
246	Georg Bochmann	SS-Sturmbannführer	II./SS-Kradschützen-Regiment "Thule"	17 May 1943	Awarded 140th Swords 26 March 1945	A black-and-white photograph of a man wearing a military uniform and neck order in shape of an Iron Cross. His hair is combed back and his facial expression is determined.
261	Paul Hausser	SS-Obergruppenführer	II. SS-Panzerkorps	28 July 1943	Awarded 90th Swords 26 August 1944	
277	Otto Baum	SS-Obersturmbannführer	SS-Panzergrenadier-Regiment "Totenkopf"	22 August 1943	Awarded 95th Swords 2 September 1944	
286	Walter Krüger	SS-Gruppenführer	SS-Panzergrenadier-Division "Das Reich"	31 August 1943	Awarded 120th Swords 11 January 1945	
296	Heinz Harmel	SS-Standartenführer	SS-Panzergrenadier-Regiment 3	7 September 1943	Awarded 116th Swords 15 December 1944	
297	Hermann Prieß	SS-Brigadeführer	3. SS-Panzergrenadier-Division "Totenkopf"	9 September 1943	Awarded 65th Swords 24 April 1944	
303	Sylvester Stadler	SS-Obersturmbannführer	SS-Panzergrenadier-Regiment "Der Führer"	16 September 1943	Awarded 152nd Swords 6 May 1945	A black-and-white photograph of a man wearing a military uniform with fur collar, side cap and a neck order in shape of an Iron Cross. His cap has an emblem in shape of a human skull and crossed bones.
310	Hubert-Erwin Meierdress	SS-Hauptsturmführer	I./SS-Panzer-Regiment 3	5 October 1943	Killed in action 4 January 1945	
315	Herbert-Otto Gille	SS-Brigadeführer	SS-Panzergrenadier-Division "Wiking"	1 November 1943	Awarded 47th Swords 20 February 1944; 12th Diamonds 19 April 1944	A black-and-white photograph of a man sitting at a desk, wearing a military uniform and neck order, in shape of an Iron Cross.
327	Hans Dorr	SS-Hauptsturmführer	I./SS-Panzergrenadier-Regiment "Germania"	13 November 1943	Awarded 77th Swords 9 July 1944	
353	Christian Tychsen (Waffen-SS)	SS-Sturmbannführer	II./SS-Panzer-Regiment 2	10 December 1943	Killed in action 28 July 1944	A black-and-white photograph of a man wearing a military uniform, peaked cap and a neck order in shape of an Iron Cross. His cap has an emblem in shape of a human skull and crossed bones. A large scar on his chin is visible.
359	Albert Frey	SS-Obersturmbannführer	SS-Panzergrenadier-Regiment "Leibstandarte SS Adolf Hitler"	29 December 1943		
375	Hugo Kraas	SS-Obersturmbannführer	SS-Panzergrenadier-Regiment 2	24 January 1944		
377	Joachim Peiper	SS-Sturmbannführer	SS-Panzer-Regiment 1	27 January 1944	Awarded 119th Swords 11 January 1945	A black-and-white photograph of a man wearing a military uniform, peaked cap and a neck order in shape of an Iron Cross. His cap has an emblem in shape of a human skull and crossed bones.
380	Michael Wittmann	SS-Untersturmführer	SS-Panzer-Regiment 1 "Leibstandarte SS Adolf Hitler"	30 January 1944	Awarded 71st Swords 22 June 1944	A black-and-white photograph of a man wearing a black military uniform, peaked cap and a neck order in shape of an Iron Cross. His cap has an emblem in shape of a human skull and crossed bones.
393	Theodor Wisch	SS-Brigadeführer	1. SS Division Leibstandarte SS "Adolf Hitler"	12 February 1944	Awarded 94th Swords 30 August 1944	
423	Fritz von Scholz Edler von Rarancze	SS-Brigadeführer	11. SS-Freiwilligen-Panzergrenadier-Division "Nordland"	12 March 1944	Awarded 85th Swords 8 August 1944	
479	Walter Schmidt	SS-Hauptsturmführer	II./SS-Panzergrenadier-Regiment "Westland"	14 May 1944		
480	Karl Ullrich	SS-Obersturmbannführer	SS-Panzergrenadier-Regiment 6 "Theodor Eicke"	14 May 1944		
546	Karl Kloskowski	SS-Obersturmführer	7./SS-Panzer-Regiment 2	11 August 1944	Missing in action 23 April 1945	A black-and-white photograph of a man wearing a camouflage military uniform, side cap and a pair of binoculars around his neck. His cap has an emblem in shape of a human skull and crossed bones.
548	Max Wünsche	SS-Obersturmbannführer	SS-Panzer-Regiment 12	11 August 1944		
554	Heinz Macher	SS-Obersturmführer	16. (Pi)/SS-Panzergrenadier-Regiment 3	19 August 1944		
559	Bruno Hinz	SS-Untersturmführer	1./SS-Panzergrenadier-Regiment 38	23 August 1944		
563	Wilhelm Bittrich	SS-Obergruppenführer	II. SS-Panzerkorps	28 August 1944	Awarded 153rd Swords 6 May 1945	
570	Friedrich-Wilhelm Bock	SS-Oberführer	9. SS-Panzer-Division	2 September 1944		
591	Helmut Scholz	SS-Obersturmführer	II./SS-Freiwillige-Panzergrenadier-Regiment 49	21 September 1944		
595	Hellmuth Becker	SS-Oberführer	3. SS-Panzer-Division "Totenkopf"	21 September 1944		
596	Johannes-Rudolf Mühlenkamp	SS-Standartenführer	5. SS-Panzer-Division "Wiking"	21 September 1944		
601	Otto Meyer	SS-Obersturmbannführer	SS-Panzer-Regiment 9	30 September 1944*	Killed in action 29 August 1944 (Note: Otto Meyer's date of death is inconclusive. According to Walther-Per Fellgiebel date of death is 24 August 1944 while Veit Scherzer presents 29 August 1944.)	A black-and-white photograph of a man wearing a military uniform, cap and a neck order in shape of an Iron Cross. His cap has an emblem in shape of a human skull and crossed bones.
608	Heinz Reinefarth	SS-Gruppenführer	Korpsgruppe von dem Bach	30 September 1944		A black-and-white photograph of a man in semi profile wearing a military uniform and neck order, in shape of an Iron Cross. His dark hair is combed to the back. He has determined facial expression and a large scar on his cheek.
639	Max Simon	SS-Gruppenführer	16. SS-Panzergrenadier-Division "Reichsführer SS"	28 October 1944		
650	Helmut Dörner	SS-Standartenführer	SS-Panzergrenadier-Regiment 8	16 November 1944	Awarded 129th Swords 1 February 1945	
651	Albrecht Krügel	SS-Obersturmbannführer	SS-Panzergrenadier-Regiment 24	16 November 1944	Killed in action 16 March 1945	
668	Gerhard Bremer	SS-Sturmbannführer	SS-Panzer-Aufklärungs-Abteilung 12	26 November 1944		
670	Artur Phleps	SS-Gruppenführer	SS-Division "Prinz Eugen"	24 November 1944*	Killed in action 21 September 1944	
680	Jürgen Wagner	SS-Brigadeführer	4. SS-Freiwillige-Panzergrenadier-Brigade "Nederland"	11 December 1944		
685	Fritz Biermeier	SS-Sturmbannführer	II./SS-Panzer-Regiment 3	26 December 1944*	Killed in action 11 October 1944	
687	Günther-Eberhardt Wisliceny	SS-Obersturmbannführer	SS-Panzergrenadier-Regiment 3 "Deutschland"	26 December 1944	Awarded 151st Swords 6 May 1945	A black-and-white photograph of a man in semi profile wearing a military uniform. His hair is combed back and his facial expression is determined.
688	Otto Weidinger	SS-Obersturmbannführer	SS-Panzergrenadier-Regiment 4	26 December 1944	Awarded 150 Swords 6 May 1945	A black-and-white photograph of a man wearing a military uniform, peaked cap and a neck order in shape of an Iron Cross. His cap has an emblem in shape of a human skull and crossed bones.
701	Bruno Streckenbach	SS-Gruppenführer	19. Waffen-Grenadier Division der Waffen-SS	16 January 1945		
714	Max Schäfer	SS-Obersturmbannführer	III. Panzerkorps	25 January 1945		
720	Kurt Wahl	SS-Sturmbannführer	SS-Panzer-Aufklärungs-Abteilung in the 17. SS-Panzergrenadier-Division "Götz von Berlichingen"	1 February 1945		
721	Joachim Rumohr	SS-Brigadeführer	8. SS-Kavallerie-Division "Florian Geyer"	1 February 1945	Suicide 11 February 1945	
722	August-Friedrich Zehender	SS-Brigadeführer	22. SS-Freiwillige-Kavallerie-Division "Maria Theresia"	1 February 1945	Killed in action 11 February 1945	
723	Karl Pfeffer-Wildenbruch	SS-Obergruppenführer	IX. SS-Gebirgskorps	1 February 1945		
755	Ernst-August Krag	SS-Sturmbannführer	SS-Panzer-Aufklärungs-Abteilung 2	28 February 1945		
756	Heinrich Schmelzer	SS-Hauptsturmführer of the Reserves	SS-Panzer-Pionier-Bataillon 2	28 February 1945		
783	Werner Pötschke	SS-Sturmbannführer	1./SS-Panzer-Regiment 1	15 March 1945	Killed in action 24 March 1945 (Note: Werner Pötschke's date of death is inconclusive. According to Walther-Per Fellgiebel date of death is 21 March 1945 while Veit Scherzer presents 24 March 1945.)	
785	Fritz Vogt	SS-Hauptsturmführer	I./SS-Panzergrenadier-Regiment 23	16 March 1945	Killed in action 3 April 1945	
802	Friedrich Jeckeln	SS-Obergruppenführer	V. SS-Gebirgskorps	8 March 1945		
814	Walter Girg	SS-Obersturmführer	502nd SS Jäger Battalion	1 April 1945		
820	Otto Paetsch	SS-Obersturmbannführer	SS-Panzer-Regiment 10	5 April 1945*	Killed in action 16 March 1945	
826	Dipl-Ing. Otto Skorzeny	SS-Obersturmbannführer	SS-Jagd-Verbände und Kampfkommandant Schwedt/Oder	9 April 1945		
835	Max Hansen	SS-Obersturmbannführer	SS-Panzergrenadier-Regiment 1	17 April 1945		A black-and-white photograph of a man wearing a military uniform, peaked cap and a neck order in shape of an Iron Cross. His cap has an emblem in shape of a human skull and crossed bones.
(844)	Franz Hack? (Note: The recommendation for Franz Hack's Oak Leaves to the Knight's Cross was submitted to the Heerespersonalamt (HPA—Army Staff Office) by the Division sometime between 16 and 19 April 1945 and approved by the commander of the IV. SS-Korps Herbert Otto Gille. Missing is the approval from the 6. Armee and Heeresgruppe Süd. There is no indication whether the recommendation was approved. The response from the Reichsführer-SS was prepared but missing is a date and signature. The existing card is not contemporary. There is no indication in the press that the award was presented. According to Fellgiebel Hack received the Oak Leaves from SS-Obergruppenführer and General of the SS Herbert-Otto Gille, commanding general IV. SS-Panzerkorps. The sequential number "844" and date of award were assigned by the Association of Knight's Cross Recipients (AKCR).)	SS-Obersturmbannführer	SS-Panzergrenadier-Regiment 10	18 April 1945		
(845)	Paul-Albert Kausch? (Note: No evidence of the award can be found in the German Federal Archives. Fellgiebel claimed that Paul-Albert Kausch, at the time wounded in the Reich Chancellery, had received news that according to a radio message received from Panzer AOK 11 had been awarded the Oak Leaves on 23 April 1945 from SS-Brigadeführer Joachim Ziegler. Ziegler, the Division commander of Kausch, was killed in action on 1 May 1945. Krätschmer however indicated that Kausch was wounded 25 April, therefore he couldn't have received the news on 25 April. The 11th SS Volunteer Panzergrenadier Division Nordland was only subordinated to the 11th Panzer Armee in February 1945. The Stab of the 11th Panzer Army then relocated to the Western Front where it surrendered on 21 April. Krätschmer claimed that the award was presented for the actions during the middle of April east of Berlin. Mr. J.S. Fischer, who was verifying the Oak Leaves presentation on behalf of Fellgiebel is not aware of a radio message received from the Panzer AOK 11. Fischer indicated that he only referenced the information presented by Kausch, which is already stated in Krätschmer. According to information by Fischer on 14 October 2004, Fellgiebel had made the note about the Panzer AOK 11. The sequential number "845" was assigned by the Association of Knight's Cross Recipients (AKCR), according to Krätschmer the number is "846", the date was accepted by the AKCR. Kausch was member of the AKCR.)	SS-Obersturmbannführer	SS-Panzer-Regiment 11	23 April 1945		
(848)	Joachim Ziegler	SS-Brigadeführer	11. SS-Freiwillige-Panzergrenadier-Division "Nordland"	28 April 1945	Killed in action 2 May 1945	
(861)	Werner Ostendorff? (Note: No evidence of the award to Werner Ostendorff can be found in the German Federal Archives. The award was unlawfully presented by SS-Oberstgruppenführer Sepp Dietrich. The date is taken from the announcement made by the 6. SS-Panzerarmee. The sequential number "861" was assigned by the Association of Knight's Cross Recipients (AKCR).)	SS-Gruppenführer	2. SS-Panzer-Division "Das Reich"	6 May 1945*	Died of wounds 1 May 1945	
(862)	Rudolf Lehmann? (Note: No evidence of the award can be found in the German Federal Archives. The award was unlawfully presented by SS-Oberstgruppenführer Sepp Dietrich. The date is taken from the announcement made by the 6. SS-Panzerarmee. The sequential number "862" was assigned by the Association of Knight's Cross Recipients (AKCR). Lehmann was member of the AKCR.)	SS-Standartenführer	2. SS-Panzer-Division "Das Reich"	6 May 1945		
(863)	Karl Kreutz? (Note: No evidence of the award can be found in the German Federal Archives. The award was unlawfully presented by SS-Oberstgruppenführer Sepp Dietrich. The date is taken from the announcement made by the 6. SS-Panzerarmee. The sequential number "863" was assigned by the Association of Knight's Cross Recipients (AKCR). Karl Kreutz was member of the AKCR.)	SS-Standartenführer	SS-Panzer-Artillerie-Regiment 2	6 May 1945		
(871)	Matthias Kleinheisterkamp? (Note: Fellgiebel claims that the nomination was received by the Heerespersonalamt (HPA—Army Staff Office) via teleprinter from the commander-in-chief of the 9. Armee, general Theodor Busse, on 21 April 1945. Busse had nominated SS-Obergruppenführer Kleinheisterkamp for the Oak Leaves. The claim is that the teleprinter message contained a note that the formal procedure for immediate approval should be waited for (Dienstwegvorschlag bzgl. Sofortverleihung abwarten). This teleprinter message cannot be found in the German Nation Archives (Bestand RH 7). Busse had also nominated by teleprinter Generalmajor Joachim von Siegroth on 21 April. This teleprinter message can be found in the Nation Archives (Bundesarchiv RH 7/300). According to Fellgiebel the same note can be found on von Siegroth's nomination. This means that a formal nomination, in this instance via the Army Group Vistula, followed. Both announced "formal nominations" never followed and were never received by the HPA. The teleprinter message nomination of von Siegroth is listed in the book of "awarded Knight Crosses" with an entry date of 21 April but Kleinheisterkamp's nomination isn't. The reason for this may be that the liaison officer of the Waffen-SS at the HPA/P5a may have forwarded the nomination to the Reichsführer-SS for approval. From here it should have been returned to the HPA which it wasn't. The distribution list of von Siegroth's nomination indicates that general Busse had informed the Army Group Vistula and the chief of the HPA general Wilhelm Burgdorf. It is very likely that Kleinheisterkamp's nomination had the same distribution list as von Siegroth's, because the same principles applied. Burgdorf therefore should have been informed of the formal procedure regarding Kleinheisterkamp's nomination. The question remains unanswered whether the Führer Headquarter or Adolf Hitler has approved the direct nomination of Kleinheisterkamp on 28 April or not. Scherzer claims that this is very unlikely because Burgdorf would not have done two things. First, submit a nomination to the Führer without having assessed the situation himself, which only would have been possible if he had studied the formal paperwork. Secondly he would not have bypassed the formal procedure which was already initiated. Additionally the radio connection to the Führerbunker was down since 5:00 on 28 April 1945. The sequential number "871" was assigned by the Association of Knight's Cross Recipients (AKCR) and the date is assumed.)	SS-Gruppenführer	XI. SS-Panzerkorps	9 May 1945*	Killed in action 29 April 1945 (Note: According to Fellgiebel on 2 May 1945 in the Battle of Halbe.)	
(872)	Hanns-Heinrich Lohmann? (Note: The nomination was received by the Heerespersonalamt (HPA—Army Staff Office) from the troop on 25 March 1943 and was approved by the commanding general of the III. (germ.) SS-Panzerkorps. Missing is the approval from the commander-in-chief of the 11. Armee, Army Group Vistula and from the Reichsführer-SS. The HPA created a formal nomination without a sequential number on 27 March 1945. Both nominations are retained in the Nation Archives. Both nominations give no information whether the nomination was approved and whether the Oak Leaves had been awarded. The nomination list of the higher grade of the Knight's Cross of the Iron Cross with Oak Leaves only dates the nomination entry on 25 March 1945. The Order Commission of the Association of Knight's Cross Recipients (AKCR) processed this case in 1974 and decided: yes, 872nd Oak Leaves. According to the AKCR the award was present in accordance with the Dönitz decree. This is illegal according to the Deutsche Dienststelle (WASt) and lacks legal justification. The sequential number "872" and date were assigned by the AKCR. Lohmann was a member of the AKCR.)	SS-Obersturmbannführer	SS-Freiwillige-Panzergrenadier-Regiment 49	9 May 1945		
(875)	Alfons Rebane? (Note: Alfons Rebane's nomination was submitted to the Heeres Personalamt (Army Staff Office) on 12 April 1945. The archives only hold a copy of the nomination. There is no indication or remark that the nomination was processed. The nomination list for the higher grade of the Knight's Cross with Oak Leaves dates the nomination on 2 April 1945. This list also gives no indication that the nomination had been processed. The Order Commission of the Association of Knight's Cross Recipients (AKCR) processed this case in 1974 and decided: 875th Oak Leaves on 8 May 1945. The sequential number "875" was assigned by the AKCR, the date was later changed by Fellgiebel to 9 May 1945. Rebane was member of the AKCR.)	Waffen-Obersturmbannführer	Waffen-Grenadier-Regiment der Waffen-SS 46	9 May 1945		
