= Kleisoura, Kastoria =

Village in Macedonia, Greece

Kleisoura Κλεισούρα Clisura, Vlahoclisura
- Municipal unit
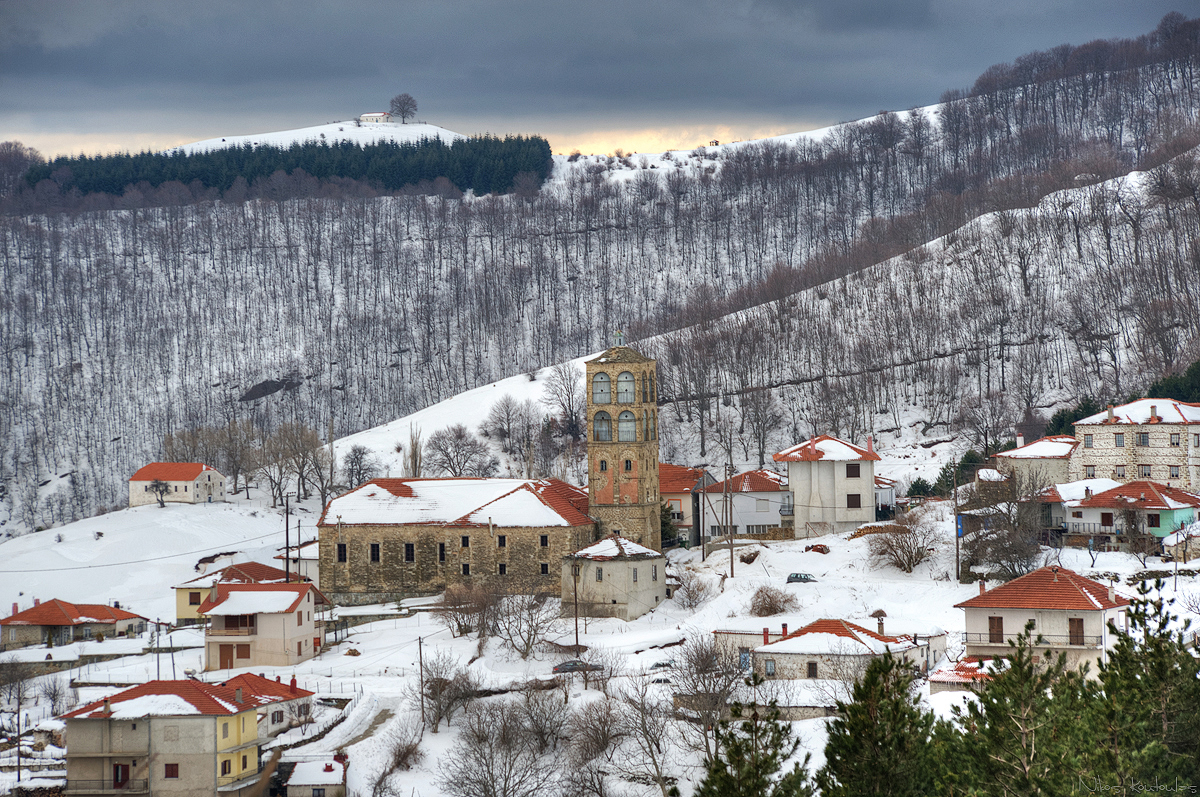

- Location within the regional unit

- Location within Greece
- Coordinates: 40°32′N 21°28′E
- Country: Greece
- Geographic region: Macedonia
- Administrative region: Western Macedonia
- Regional unit: Kastoria
- Municipality: Kastoria

Area
  - Municipal unit: 37.1 km^{2} (14.3 sq mi)

Population (2021)
  - Municipal unit: 223
  - Municipal unit density: 6.01/km^{2} (15.6/sq mi)
- Time zone: UTC+2 (EET)
  - Summer (DST): UTC+3 (EEST)
- Vehicle registration: KT

Kleisoura (formerly Vlachokleisoura; Greek: Κλεισούρα, also Βλαχοκλεισούρα, Vlachokleisoúra; Aromanian: Clisura or Vlahoclisura) is a traditionally Aromanian (Vlach) settlement and a former municipality in Kastoria regional unit, Macedonia, Greece. Since the 2011 local government reform, it is part of the municipality of Kastoria, of which it is a municipal unit. The municipal unit has an area of 37.069 km^{2} and a population of 223 (as of 2021).

== Kleisoura massacre ==
On 5 April 1944, Bulgarian militiamen as well as German occupation forces of 4th SS Polizei Panzergrenadier Division, the same unit to later that year commit the massacre in Distomo, slaughtered the women and children of Kleisoura in retaliation for the execution of three German soldiers by ELAS close to the village. The ELAS guerrillas, led by Alexis Rosios from Siatisti ("Captain Ypsilantis"), who were active in the region, had attacked a German military phalanx at Daouli, close to Kleisoura, and had killed a vanguard of three motorcyclists. According to testimonies, the male residents, fearing retaliation, fled to the mountains surrounding the village.

After finding the mutilated bodies of the Wehrmacht soldiers close to the local church, the German SS unit went to the homes, broke the doors of the majority of the houses, shot the people within, set fire to the buildings and also killed whom they found in the streets. Altogether 270 residents were killed, the overwhelming majority of them being women, children and elderly people. Involved in the atrocities was also a Bulgarian militia under German command, led by Andon Kalchev. Colonel Karl Schümers was summoned by the German administration for having ordered the slaughter of women and children. He testified that his soldiers were forced to kill the civilians because rebel forces were hiding and firing through the village, whereupon he was acquitted, despite the contradictory statements of his subordinates. After the war it was proved that his testimony was false.

== Notable people ==
- Marcu Beza (1882–1949), Aromanian writer, folklorist and diplomat in Romania
- Ion Foti (1887–1946), Aromanian writer, journalist and translator in Romania

Army General Constantine Lianis (Κωνσταντίνος Λιάνης), a war hero, and one of the founders of the Greek secret services (KYP), originated from Kleisoura. His daughter is Dimitra Liani (Δήμητρα Λιάνη), who became first the lover, and then the third and last wife of Prime Minister Andreas Papandreou.
