= IV SS Panzer Corps =

- Active: August 1943 – May 1945
- Country: Germany
- Branch: Waffen-SS
- Type: Panzer corps
- Role: Armoured warfare
- Size: Corps
- Engagements: World War II: Battle of Radzymin; Battle of Siedlce; Operation Konrad; Operation Konrad II; Operation Konrad III; Operation Spring Awakening

Commanders
- Notable commanders: SS-Obergruppenführer Herbert Otto Gille

The IV SS Panzer Corps was a panzer corps of the Waffen-SS which saw action on the Eastern Front and in the Balkans during World War II.

== History ==
The corps was formed in August 1943 in Poitiers, France. The formation was originally to be a skeleton formation to supervise those SS divisions that were being reformed as SS panzer divisions.

On 30 June 1944, the formation absorbed the VII SS Panzer Corps and was reformed as a headquarters for the 3rd SS Panzer Division "Totenkopf" and the 5th SS Panzer Division "Wiking". The corps was placed under the command of former Wiking commander SS-Obergruppenführer Herbert Otto Gille.

The corps was placed into the line around Warsaw, Poland, where it saw action against the Red Army as a part of the 9th Army. In August 1944, elements of the corps took part in the suppression of the Warsaw Uprising. After holding the line near Warsaw, the corps was pushed back to the area near Modlin, where it saw heavy fighting until December.

When SS-Obergruppenführer Karl Pfeffer Wildenbruch's IX SS Mountain Corps and large numbers of Hungarian troops were encircled in Budapest in December 1944, the corps was shifted south from Army Group A to join the 6th Army and to take part in the relief efforts. The operations were named Konrad. In Operation Konrad III, the largest of the relief operations, the corps destroyed all the tanks of the Soviet 3rd Ukrainian Front in an intense two-week battle in Transdanubia but could not relieve the city.

After the failure of Operation Konrad III, the corps was moved west to the area around Lake Balaton, where it was responsible for defending the left flank of the Operation Spring Awakening (Frühlingserwachen), near Stuhlweissenberg. After the failure of this operation, the Soviet Vienna offensive tore a gap between the corps and the neighbouring Hungarian Third Army. After escaping an encirclement thanks to the efforts of the 9th SS Panzer Division "Hohenstaufen", the corps withdrew towards Vienna. The remnants of the corps surrendered to the Americans on 9 May 1945.

== Commanders ==
- SS-Obergruppenführer Alfred Wünnenberg (5 August 1943 - 23 October 1943)
- SS-Obergruppenführer Walter Krüger (23 October 1943 - 1 July 1944)
- SS-Obergruppenführer Matthias Kleinheisterkamp (1 July 1944 - 20 July 1944)
- SS-Brigadeführer Nikolaus Heilmann (20 July 1944 - 6 August 1944)
- SS-Obergruppenfuhrer Herbert Otto Gille (6 August 1944 - 8 May 1945)

== Orders of battle ==
September 16, 1944 — Defence of Modlin

- Corps staff
- Corps Group Bach
- 19th Panzer Division
- 3rd SS Panzer Division "Totenkopf"
- 5th SS Panzer Division "Wiking"
- 73rd Infantry Division
- Hungarian 1st Cavalry Division
- 104/504th Launcher Battalion
- 504th Heavy SS Artillery Battalion
- 104th SS Corps Intelligence Department
- 104th SS Medical Battalion
- IV SS Panzer Corps Field Training Battalion
- 504th Motor Vehicle Company
- 504th Garment Repair Train
- 104th SS Military Post Office

January 17, 1945 — Operation Konrad III

- Corps staff
- 3rd SS Panzer Division "Totenkopf"
- 5th SS Panzer Division "Wiking"
- 1st Panzer Division
- 3rd Panzer Division
- 509th Heavy Panzer Battalion
- 24th Panzer Detachment
- 1335th StuG Detachment
- 219th Sturmpanzer Detachment
- 17th Volks Rocket Brigade
- 104/504th Launcher Battalion
- 504th Heavy SS Artillery Battalion
- 104th SS Corps Intelligence Department
- 104th SS Medical Battalion
- IV SS Panzer Corps Field Training Battalion
- 504th Motor Vehicle Company
- 504th Garment Repair Train
- 104th SS Military Post Office

March 1, 1945 — Operation Spring Awakening

- Corps staff
- 3rd SS Panzer Division "Totenkopf"
- 5th SS Panzer Division "Wiking"
- 356th Infantry Division
- 104/504th Launcher Battalion
- 504th Heavy SS Artillery Battalion
- 104th SS Corps Intelligence Department
- 104th SS Medical Battalion
- IV SS Panzer Corps Field Training Battalion
- 504th Motor Vehicle Company
- 504th Garment Repair Train
- 104th SS Military Post Office
