= Herbert-Ernst Vahl =

German general (1896–1944)

- Born: 9 October 1896
- Died: 22 July 1944 (aged 47); Thessaloniki, Occupied Greece
- Military career
- Allegiance: Nazi Germany
- Branch: Waffen SS
- Rank: SS-Brigadeführer
- Commands: SS Panzergrenadier Division Das Reich; 4th SS Polizei Panzergrenadier Division
- Conflicts: World War II
- Awards: Knight's Cross of the Iron Cross

Herbert-Ernst Vahl was a German SS functionary during the Nazi era. In World War II, he commanded the SS Division Das Reich and the SS Polizei Division. He was a recipient of the Knight's Cross of the Iron Cross of Nazi Germany.

In February 1943, Vahl was promoted to Oberführer, and given command of the SS Division Das Reich which was stationed in the Soviet Union. While in command during the Third Battle of Kharkov he was seriously wounded and awarded the Knight's Cross of the Iron Cross. After recovering from his wounds he became the Inspector of Panzer troops in the SS Führungshauptamt (SS Leadership Main Office). In July 1944 Vahl returned to active service with the SS Polizei Division which was stationed in Thessalonika, Greece. Vahl arrived to assume command of the Division on 13 July 1944 but was killed in an auto accident on 22 July 1944.

Military offices
Preceded by SS-Obergruppenführer Georg Keppler	Commander of 2. SS-Division Das Reich; 10 February 1943 – 18 March 1943	Succeeded by SS-Oberführer Kurt Brasack
Preceded by SS-Oberführer Friedrich-Wilhelm Bock	Commander of 4th SS Polizei Division; 7 May 1944 – 22 July 1944	Succeeded by SS-Standartenführer Karl Schümers
