= Operation Konrad III =

German military offensive on the Eastern Front of the Second World War

- Part of Budapest Offensive
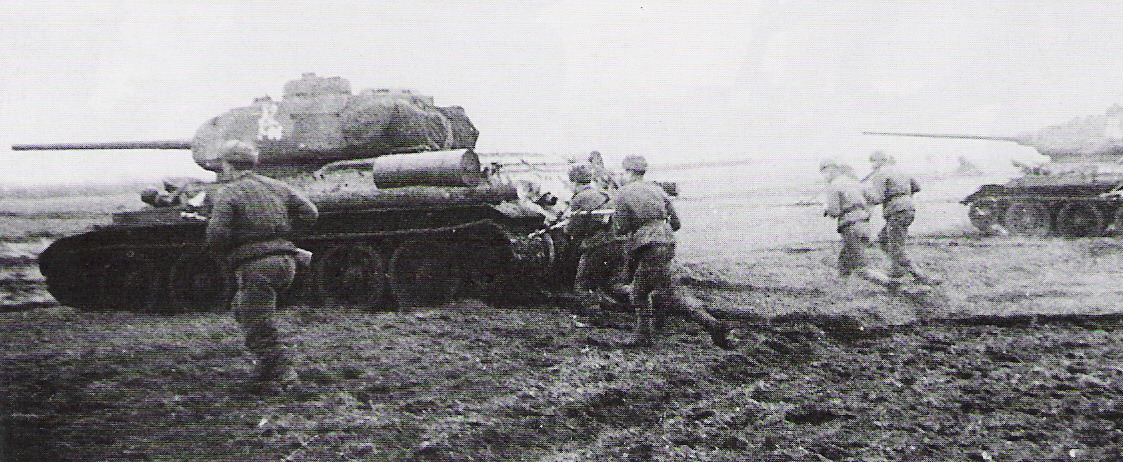
- Counterattacking Soviet infantry and T-34-85 tanks of the 18th Tank Corps near Lake Balaton, 1945
Date	18 January 1945 – 27 January 1945
Location	Lake Balaton, Hungary
Result	Inconclusive

Belligerents
Germany (Kingdom of Hungary (1920–1946)) Hungary	Soviet Union

Commanders and leaders
(Nazi Germany) Hermann Balck	(Soviet Union) Fyodor Tolbukhin

Units involved
(Nazi Germany) 6th Army	(Soviet Union) 3rd Ukrainian Front

Strength
Initial attack sector on 18 January: c. 65,000 men 376 operational AFVs	Initial attack sector on 18 January: 250 operational AFVs

Casualties and losses
164 tanks, assault guns, and tank destroyers destroyed (all of January for 6th Army)	804 tanks, assault guns, and tank destroyers destroyed (all of January for 3rd Ukrainian Front)

Operation Konrad III was a German military offensive on the Eastern Front of the Second World War. It was the third and most ambitious of the three Konrad Operations and had the objective of relieving the siege of Budapest and recapturing the entire Transdanubia region. Achieving complete surprise, the German offensive began on 18 January 1945. Supported by the Luftwaffe, the IV SS Panzer Corps, the principal German attack formation, overran the Soviet 4th Guards Army in two days, destroying hundreds of Soviet tanks along the way, reached the Danube river on 19 January and recaptured 400 square kilometres (150 sq mi) of territory in four days. After nine days of combat, and the destruction by the SS of two-thirds of Soviet tanks in the entire 3rd Ukrainian Front, the German offensive was stopped by Soviet reinforcements 25 kilometres (16 mi) short of Budapest on 26 January.

== Battle ==
The Soviet 3rd Ukrainian Front bore the brunt of the attack of the German 6th Army. Leading the assault was the IV SS Panzer Corps, which with three armored divisions and together with the III Panzer Corps, had a complement of 376 operational AFVs at the start of the offensive. 4th Guards Army, with only 250 operational AFVs, had a poor intelligence staff that completely failed to detect the arrival of IV SS Panzer Corps in front of it. The intelligence sections of the 2nd and 3rd Ukrainian Fronts falsely believed the IV SS Panzer Corps was being redeployed to western Hungary.

Enjoying the support of German airpower, the attack of the IV SS Panzer Corps achieved complete surprise, the Soviet 4th Guards Army being overrun in less than two days as the 3rd and 5th SS Panzer Divisions, well-equipped with Panther tanks qualitatively superior to the T-34s of the Soviets, destroyed many Soviet tanks in quick succession. The Soviet 18th Tank Corps and 130th Rifle Corps were encircled and a counterattack by the 7th Mechanized Corps was defeated by the SS tanks. The Germans lacked the infantry to quickly reduce the pockets and much of the Soviet forces were able to break out. By the end of the first day, a breach 30 kilometres (19 mi) wide and 60 kilometres (37 mi) deep was created in the Soviet front line and the SS tanks reached the Danube on 19 January, splitting in two the Soviet forces in Transdanubia. By 21 January, the Germans had captured 400 square kilometres (150 sq mi) of territory, an achievement comparable to the initial German gains during the Ardennes Offensive on the Western Front in December 1944.

The situation at the Soviet crossing points on the Danube bordered on panic. Subjected to constant Luftwaffe attacks, 40,000 Soviet troops and large quantities of war material were transferred to the east bank to avoid them falling into German hands. The 40,000-citizen Hungarian city and key supply transit point of Székesfehérvár was captured by the Axis on 22 January after a fight. On 19 and early 20 January there were no Soviet troops between IV SS Panzer Corps spearheads and the Axis garrison in Budapest. 3rd Ukrainian Front transferred the 5th Cavalry Corps with 100 tanks, 360 artillery pieces, three anti-tank gun regiments and six artillery regiments to block the gap. It did so in time on 20 January after a 60-kilometre (37 mi) march as the Germans had also suffered considerable human and material losses in destroying all the tanks of the 4th Guards Army. It also had critical levels of fuel and ammunition and did not yet control Székesfehérvár that day, thereby lengthening the German supply lines.

The Soviet 1st Mechanized Corps was also deployed to fight the SS, slowing down the German advance which was redirected north-east towards Lake Velence. 3rd SS Panzer Division Totenkopf pushed into the Soviet defenses and was within 25 kilometres (16 mi) of the Budapest pocket by 26 January. The 1st Panzer Division penetrated the Soviet defensive lines near Vál and established radio contact with the defenders of Budapest. It was then ordered by 6th Army commander Hermann Balck to fall back, triggering outrage with Herbert Gille, the commander of IV SS Panzer Corps. The fundamental cause behind Balck's order was the lack of infantry in the corps, which meant long and vulnerable security lines.

== Aftermath ==
Not involving the 2nd Panzer Army to the south in the initial offensive was a mistake on the part of the Army Group South commander Otto Wöhler. A simultaneous offensive by 2nd Panzer Army and Army Group F might have severed all of 3rd Ukrainian Front's supply lines. Adolf Hitler refused to authorize the operation, codenamed Icebreaker, as he was concerned with a potential Soviet offensive from the south-east that might quickly capture the Nagykanizsa oilfields. The Soviets to the south in fact had no independent offensive designs as they were concerned about the potential for a German attack in this sector.

On 21 January, Stavka ordered two pontoon bridges across the Danube (Dunapentele and Dunaföldvár) to be blown up and authorized a full withdrawal behind the Danube if necessary. Semyon Timoshenko was entrusted with coordinating the operations of the 3rd and 2nd Ukrainian Fronts. Parts of the 5th Air Army were transferred from 2nd Ukrainian Front to help out the 3rd, the 18th Tank Corps was re-equipped after losing most of its tanks in the initial battles, and elements of the 27th Army were transferred south-west of Budapest. Fyodor Tolbukhin, 3rd Ukrainian Front commander, received the 30th Rifle Corps, 54th Rifle Corps and 23rd Tank Corps as reinforcements.

On 27 January, Tolbukhin commenced his counteroffensive with the objective of using three mechanized corps and one rifle corps to encircle and destroy the advanced groups of the IV SS Panzer Corps. A second force would retake Székesfehérvár to cut off the German supply lines and a coordinated attack would be launched from southern Transdanubia to encircle the entire IV SS Panzer Corps.

Despite the disparity in the level of forces involved between the two sides, the Soviet offensive failed in its stated objectives. On 25 January, only 50 out of 306 tanks in the IV SS Panzer Corps had been operational due to battle damage, mechanical wear and lack of fuel. The Soviet failure was facilitated by the poor decisions of the Soviet higher leadership. Rodion Malinovsky, commander of 2nd Ukrainian Front, threw the 23rd Tank Corps into combat without reconnaissance or close air support. The corps was destroyed by the Germans in a single day. The Germans destroyed 122 Soviet tanks on the first day of the Soviet attack, of which about 100 belonged to 23rd Tank Corps. Regardless of such gross errors, the Red Army gained ground as the 54th Rifle Corps and the entire 57th Army attacked from the south. 28th Rifle Corps was also transferred from Stavka reserve to take part in the counteroffensive. The combat was heavy and 70 wrecked and 35 disabled tanks and assault guns remained on the edge of the village of Vereb alone. By 1 February, the Soviets had retaken most of the ground lost in Konrad III with the principal exception of Székesfehérvár.

== Sources ==
- Frieser, Karl-Heinz; Schmider, Klaus; Schönherr, Klaus; Schreiber, Gerhard; Ungváry, Kristián; Wegner, Bernd (2007). Die Ostfront 1943/44 – Der Krieg im Osten und an den Nebenfronten [The Eastern Front 1943–1944: The War in the East and on the Neighbouring Fronts]. Das Deutsche Reich und der Zweite Weltkrieg [Germany and the Second World War] (in German). Vol. VIII. München: Deutsche Verlags-Anstalt. ISBN 978-3-421-06235-2.
- Frieser, Karl-Heinz (2017). Germany and the Second World War - The Eastern Front 1943-44: the War in the East and o the Neighboring Fronts. Volume VIII. Great Britain: Oxford University Press. ISBN 9780198723462.
- Nash, Douglas E. (2020). From the Realm of a Dying Sun. Vol. 2, The IV. SS-Panzerkorps in the Budapest Relief Efforts, December 1944–February 1945. Havertown & Oxford: Casemate Publishers. ISBN 978-1-61200-8738.
- Ungváry, Kristián (2003). Budapest Ostroma [Battle for Budapest] (in Hungarian). London: I.B. Tauris. ISBN 1-86064-727-8.
