= Arthur Mülverstedt =

German general

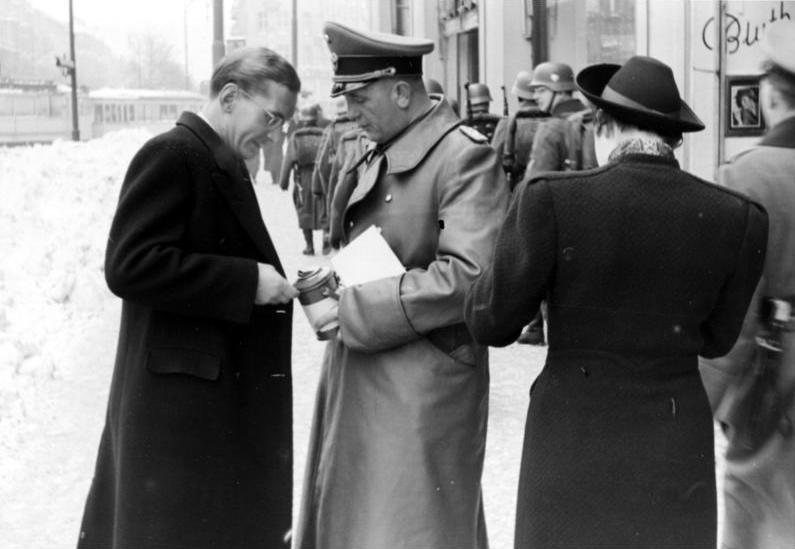
- Mülverstedt in 1939
- Born: 30 June 1894; Gebesee, Province of Saxony, German Empire
- Died: 10 August 1941 (aged 47); Luga, Soviet Union
- Military career
- Allegiance: German Empire; Weimar Republic; Nazi Germany
- Branch: Imperial German Army; Ordnungspolizei; Schutzstaffel
- Service years: 1914–1941
- Rank: SS-Gruppenführer
- Unit: SS Division Polizei
- Conflicts: World War I World War II

Arthur Mülverstedt (30 June 1894 – 10 August 1941) was a German SS and police (Ordnungspolizei) official during the Nazi era who served on the personal staff of Heinrich Himmler. During World War II, he commanded of the SS Division Polizei; he was killed in action in 1941.

== Police and SS career ==
Mülverstedt was born on 30 June 1894. He joined the army in March 1914 served during World War I. After the war, Mülverstedt joined the Sicherheitspolizei (security police) on 15 September 1919 (later redesignated the Schutzpolizei), and was assigned to posts in Berlin, Eiche, and Erfurt. Mülverstedt joined the Nazi Party on 30 July 1932. He was transferred from the Schutzpolizei to the Landespolizei in 1933. In March 1935 he left the Landespolizei and joined the Reichsheer.

Mülverstedt returned to the Schutzpolizei; he joined the SS on 20 April 1938 and was attached to Personal Staff Reichsführer-SS, command staff of Heinrich Himmler, head of the SS. In 1938 he became the Commander of Schutzpolizei Abschnitt III for the annexations of Austria and the Sudetenland .

Mülverstedt served as the Commander of Polizeigruppe 5 which was attached to the 4th Army for the invasion of Poland. On 9 November 1940 he was promoted to the rank of SS-Gruppenfuhrer and was appointed the divisional commander of the SS Division Polizei after Karl Pfeffer Wildenbruch had returned to Himmler's staff. In this period the division was transferred from Police to SS administration. Mülverstedt led the division during Operation Barbarossa, the invasion of the Soviet Union, attached to the Army Group North. Mülverstedt was killed in action by artillery fire on 10 August 1941 during the Battle of Luga–Kingisepp.
