= Čebovce =

Čebovce Csáb
- Municipality
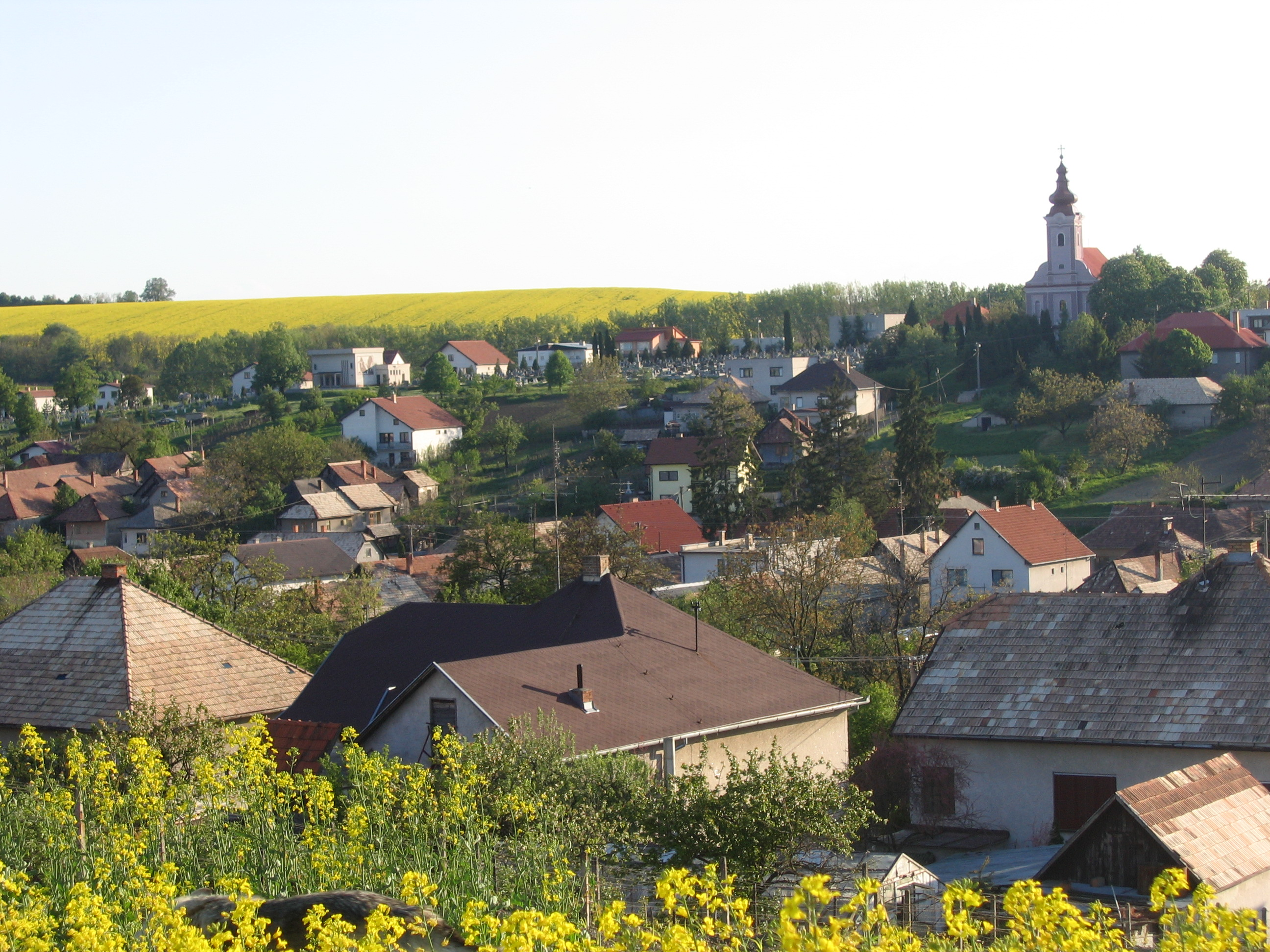

- Flag

- Location of Čebovce in the Banská Bystrica Region Location of Čebovce in Slovakia
- Coordinates: 48.18°N 19.23°E
- Country: Slovakia
- Region: Banská Bystrica Region
- District: Veľký Krtíš District
- First mentioned: 1330

Area
  - Total: 16.20 km^{2} (6.25 sq mi)
- Elevation: 215 m (705 ft)

Population (2025)
  - Total: 1,005
- Time zone: UTC+1 (CET)
  - Summer (DST): UTC+2 (CEST)
- Postal code: 991 25
- Area code: +421 47
- Vehicle registration plate (until 2022): VK

Čebovce (Hungarian: Csáb) is a village in the Veľký Krtíš District of the Banská Bystrica Region of southern Slovakia.

== History ==
This Hungarian village was first mentioned in 1240 (as Chab). Prior to the Mongol invasion of Hungary of 1241-42, the village was known as Györgymártonfalva, which was destroyed in the Mongol-Tatar invasion. The original surviving inhabitants moved further down the valley. Local legend states that the most common name in the village 'Balga' (meaning 'foolish' in Hungarian) originates from the original local populace feeling 'foolish' for being seduced from giving up the original, well naturally fortified hill-village of Györgymártonfalva for the beautiful valley of Csáb, however this is only local myth. (Csábítás meaning seduced in Hungarian.)

The first Zichy Count and Habsburg Hungary general, Zichy István's mother was from Csáb; Csábi Sara.

During the Budapest Offensive in December 1944, Čebovce was the site of battle between Soviet forces and the 4th SS Polizei Panzergrenadier Division, who were occupying the village.

It belonged to Zichy, Balassa and Somogyi noble families. After World War I, in the Peace Treaties of 1920 it was given to the newly formed Czechoslovakia. From 1938 to 1944 it returned to Hungary but the Paris Peace Treaties in 1946 gave it to Czechoslovakia, again.

== Geography ==
The municipality lies at an altitude of 215 metres (705 ft) and covers an area of 16.20 km^{2} (6.25 sq mi) (2025).

== Population ==
Population statistic (10 years)
Year	1995	2005	2015	2025
Count	1078	1025	1083	1005
Difference		−4.91%	+5.65%	−7.20%

Population statistic
Year	2024	2025
Count	1009	1005
Difference		−0.39%

It has a population of 1005 people (31 December 2025).

=== Ethnicity ===
Census 2021 (1+ %)
Ethnicity	Number	Fraction
Hungarian	641	61.39%
Slovak	498	47.7%
Not found out	19	1.81%
Total	1044	

In year 2021 was 1044 people by ethnicity 641 as Hungarian, 498 as Slovak, 19 as Not found out, 7 as German, 2 as English, 1 as Italian, 1 as Romani and 1 as Other.

Note on population: The difference values of population numbers in the table "Population statistic" and in the sections "Ethnicity" & "Religion" is caused by the use of various statistical methods.

=== Religion ===
Census 2021 (1+ %)
Religion	Number	Fraction
Roman Catholic Church	891	85.34%
None	89	8.52%
Evangelical Church	25	2.39%
Not found out	13	1.25%
Total	1044	

In year 2021 was 1044 people by religion 891 from Roman Catholic Church, 89 from None, 25 from Evangelical Church, 13 from Not found out, 8 from Greek Catholic Church, 6 from Baptists Church, 3 from Christian Congregations in Slovakia, 1 from Jewish community, 1 from Old Catholic Church, 1 from Calvinist Church, 1 from Eastern Orthodox Church, 1 from Other and not ascertained christian church, 1 from Islam, 1 from Other, 1 from United Methodist Church and 1 from Church of the Brethren.

=== Historic population ===
Historically a near whole majority ethnic Hungarian village, the census data shows the following:

According to the 2021 census, out of 1,044 inhabitants there were 578 (55.4%) Hungarians, 447 (42.8%) Slovaks, 1 Gypsy, (<0.01%), 3 Germans (<0.01%), 2 others and 13 unknowns.

1880 had a population of 575; 499 (86.8%) Hungarians, 43 (7.5%) Slovaks, 6 (1%) Germans and 27 (4.7%) other ethnics.

1910 had a population of 774; 762 (98.4%) Hungarians and 12 (1.6%) Slovaks.

1921 had a population of 769; 704 (91.5%) Hungarians, 58 (7.5%) Slovaks and 7 (0.9%) others.

1991 had a population of 1,100; 874 (79.5%) Hungarians, 222 (20.1%) Slovaks, 1 Czech and 3 unknowns.

2001 had a population of 1,056; 760 (72%) Hungarians, 285 (27%) Slovaks, 2 Czechs and 9 unknowns.

2011 had a population of 1,063; 704 (66.2%) Hungarians, 306 (28.8%) Slovaks, 9 (0.8%) Gypsies, 1 Czech, 4 others and 39 unknowns.

== Genealogical resources ==
The records for genealogical research are available at the state archive "Statny Archiv in Banska Bystrica, Slovakia"

- Roman Catholic church records (births/marriages/deaths): 1755-1890 (parish A)

== See also ==
- List of municipalities and towns in Slovakia
