= Pyrgoi massacre =

WWII massacre in Kozani, Greece

The Pyrgoi massacre was a large-scale massacre on April 23, 1944, in Kozani, Greece, perpetrated by Germans with local accomplices. Records indicate that 563 men, women, and children were killed on that day. Among the atrocities that were committed, women and children were rounded up and burned alive.

== Commanding officer ==
Colonel Karl Schümers, commander of the 7th constitution armored Grenadier police of the SS, was responsible for the massacres in Pyrgoi, Kleisoura Kastoria, and Distomo Boeotia which killed 862 men, women and children.

== Survivors ==
The survivors were forced to walk to Ptolemaida and the town was completely destroyed.

== Legacy ==
Each year the President of Greece goes to Pyrgoi to be present at the established memorial for the victims of the Holocaust. The events of April 1944 are the subject of documentaries.

== Gallery ==
The Monument of the Nazis' massacre in Pyrgoi (Katranitsa)

Wreath from small children to the monument of the Nazis' Holocaust in Pyrgoi
