= Matthias Kleinheisterkamp =

Nazi commander (1893–1945)

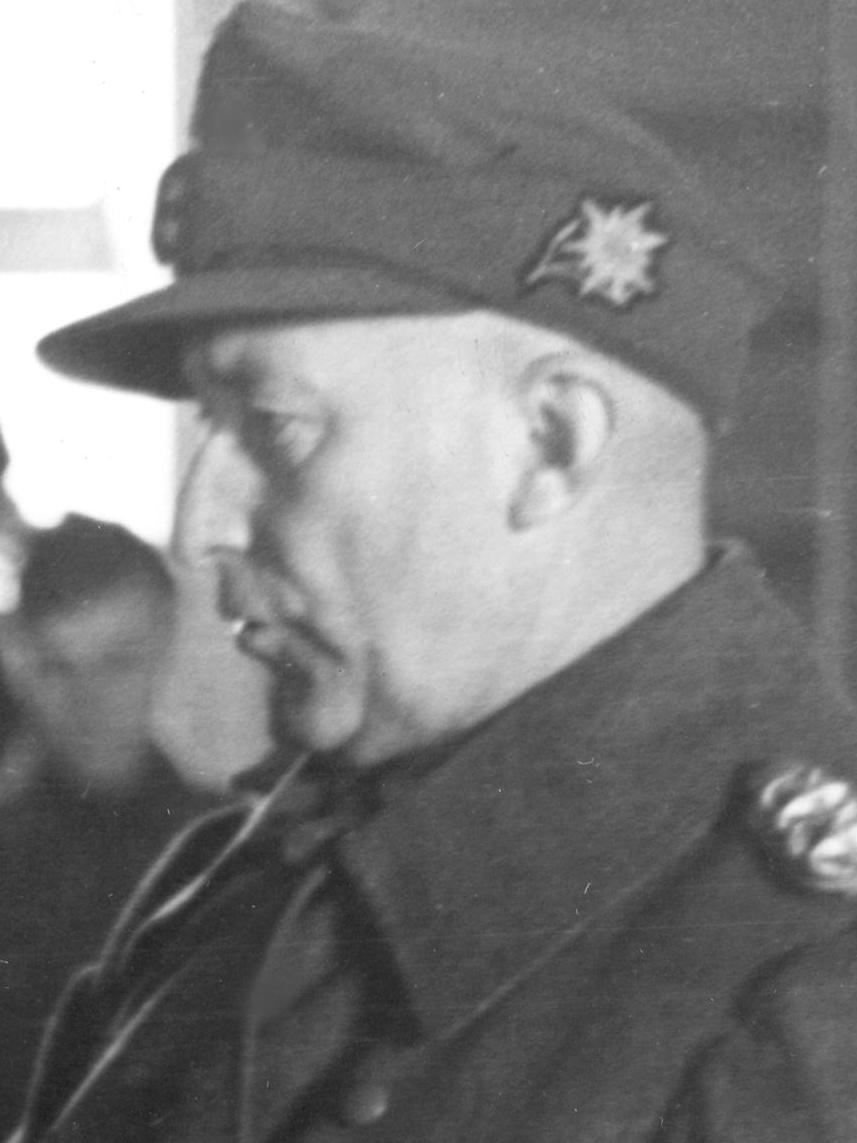
- Kleinheisterkamp c. 3 November 1944
- Born: 22 June 1893; Elberfeld, German Empire
- Died: 29 April 1945 (aged 51); Halbe, Nazi Germany
- Cause of death: Suicide
- Military career
- Allegiance: German Empire; Weimar Republic; Nazi Germany
- Branch: Prussian Army; Freikorps; Reichswehr; Waffen-SS
- Service years: 1914–1945
- Rank: SS-Obergruppenführer
- Service number: NSDAP 4,158,838; SS 132,399
- Unit: Waffen-SS Reserves
- Commands: SS Division Totenkopf SS Division Nord SS Division Das Reich
- Conflicts: World War I: World War II; Invasion of Poland; Eastern Front; Battle of Halbe
- Awards: Wound Badge; Iron Cross 1st and 2nd Class; Knight’s Cross of the Iron Cross

Signature
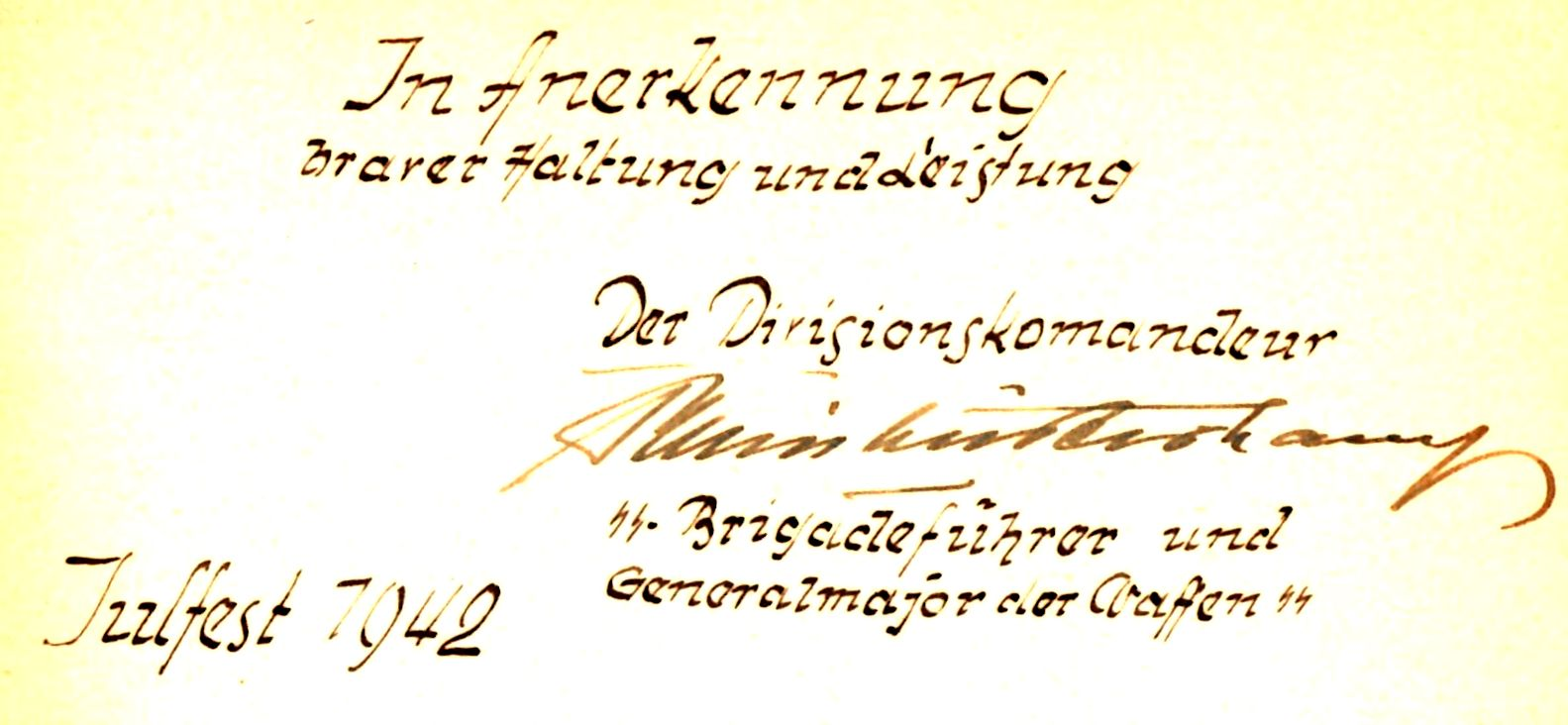

Matthias Kleinheisterkamp (22 June 1893 – 29 April 1945) was a high-ranking German SS commander during the Nazi era. Reaching the rank of SS-Obergruppenführer, he commanded the SS Division Totenkopf, SS Division Nord, SS Division Das Reich, III SS Panzer Corps, VII SS Panzer Corps, IV SS Panzer Corps, XII SS Army Corps and the XI SS Army Corps in World War II. Kleinheisterkamp died by suicide in the Battle of Halbe after being captured by the Soviets.

== Pre-war career ==
Born in 1893, Matthias Kleinheisterkamp enlisted in the Prussian Army in 1914 and served on both the Western and the Eastern Fronts of World War I. During his service in the war, he was awarded both classes of the Iron Cross and a silver grade Wound Badge. Following the war, Kleinheisterkamp joined the paramilitary group Freikorps and then served in the Reichswehr. He joined the Allgemeine-SS in November 1933, membership number 132,399. He transferred to the SS-Verfügungstruppe on 1 April 1935 and was assigned to the SS training school as an infantry instructor. In 1934, he joined the Inspectorate of the SS-VT as a senior staff officer, serving under Paul Hausser.

On 20 April 1937, Kleinheisterkamp joined the NSDAP, membership number 4,158,838. His career stalled when in June 1938 he experienced serious legal and disciplinary troubles. He was reprimanded by the SS Court Main Office and placed on leave until August 1938. Upon his return to active duty, he was assigned to the SS-Standarte Deutschland, which later became the SS Division Das Reich.

== World War II ==
With this unit, Kleinheisterkamp took part in the Invasion of Poland, where he commanded the Group Kleinheisterkamp responsible in part for the evacuation of German citizens and diplomatic personnel from Warsaw. In May 1940, he was put in charge of an infantry regiment within the SS Division Totenkopf under the overall command of Theodor Eicke. After Eicke was injured in July 1941, Kleinheisterkamp was, for a short time, commander of the Totenkopf, before being replaced by Georg Keppler. He was then transferred first to SS-Führungshauptamt (SS Leadership Main Office) and later to the SS Division Das Reich.

For his leadership of Das Reich during the operations on Eastern Front, Kleinheisterkamp was awarded the Knight's Cross of the Iron Cross. In June 1942, he took over command of the SS Division Nord, leading the unit until December 1943, when he was transferred to the Waffen-SS reserves. In January 1944, he was assigned to command the VII SS Panzer Corps, III SS Panzer Corps, IV SS Panzer Corps and the XI SS Army Corps.

== Arrest and suicide ==
Kleinheisterkamp was taken prisoner by the Soviet forces on 28 April 1945 near the village of Halbe, south-east of Berlin. He died by suicide a day later while in captivity. Other accounts state he died on 2 May in the Battle of Halbe.

== Summary of SS career ==
Dates of rank

- SS-Hauptsturmführer: 20 April 1935
- SS-Sturmbannführer: 1 June 1935
- SS-Obersturmbannführer: 20 April 1937
- SS-Standartenführer: 18 May 1940
- SS-Oberführer: 19 July 1940
- SS-Brigadeführer und Generalmajor der Waffen-SS: 9 November 1941
- SS-Gruppenführer und Generalleutnant der Waffen-SS: 1 May 1943
- SS-Obergruppenführer und General der Waffen-SS: 1 August 1944

Awards

- Clasp to the Iron Cross (1939)
  - 2nd Class (13 September 1939)
  - 1st Class (2 October 1939)
- Knight's Cross of the Iron Cross on 31 March 1942 as SS-Brigadeführer, Generalmajor of the Waffen-SS and commander of the SS-Division "Das Reich"
- 871st Oak Leaves on 9 May 1945 (posthumously) as SS-Obergruppenführer, Generalleutnant of the Waffen-SS and commanding general of the XI. SS-Panzerkorps (Note: Historian Veit Scherzer expressed doubt about the veracity of the presentation of the Oak Leaves to Matthias Kleinheisterkamp. According to Scherzer, Fellgiebel claims that the nomination was received by the Heerespersonalamt (HPA—Army Staff Office) via teleprinter from the commander-in-chief of the 9. Armee, general Theodor Busse, on 21 April 1945. Busse had nominated SS-Obergruppenführer Kleinheisterkamp for the Oak Leaves. The claim is that the teleprinter message contained a note that the formal procedure for immediate approval should be waited for (Dienstwegvorschlag bzgl. Sofortverleihung abwarten). This teleprinter message cannot be found in the German Nation Archives (Bestand RH 7). Busse had also nominated by teleprinter message Generalmajor Joachim von Siegroth on the 21 April. This teleprinter message can be found in the Nation Archives (Bundesarchiv RH 7/300). According to Fellgiebel the same note can be found on von Siegroth's nomination. This means that a formal nomination, in this instance via the Army Group Vistula, followed. Both announced "formal nominations" never followed and were never received by the HPA. The teleprinter message nomination of von Siegroth is listed in the book of "awarded Knight Crosses" with an entry date of 21 April but Kleinheisterkamp's nomination isn't. The reason for this may be that the liaison officer of the Waffen-SS at the HPA/P5a may have forwarded the nomination to the Reichsführer-SS for approval. From here it should have been returned to the HPA which it wasn't. The distribution list of von Siegroth's nomination indicates that general Busse had informed the Army Group Vistula and the chief of the HPA general Wilhelm Burgdorf. It is very likely that Kleinheisterkamp's nomination had the same distribution list as von Siegroth's, because the same principles applied. Burgdorf therefore should have been informed of the formal procedure regarding Kleinheisterkamp's nomination. The question remains unanswered whether the Führer Headquarter or Adolf Hitler has approved the direct nomination of Kleinheisterkamp on 28 April or not. Scherzer claims that this is very unlikely because Burgdorf would not have done two things. First, submit a nomination to the Führer without having assessed the situation himself, which only would have been possible if he had studied the formal paperwork. Secondly he would not have bypassed the formal procedure which was already initiated. Additionally the radio connection to the Führerbunker was down since 5:00 on 28 April 1945. The sequential number "871" was assigned by the Association of Knight's Cross Recipients (AKCR) and the date is assumed.)
- Order of the Cross of Liberty 1st Class with swords

== See also ==
- List SS-Obergruppenführer

== Sources ==
- Fellgiebel, Walther-Peer (2000) [1986]. Die Träger des Ritterkreuzes des Eisernen Kreuzes 1939–1945 — Die Inhaber der höchsten Auszeichnung des Zweiten Weltkrieges aller Wehrmachtteile [The Bearers of the Knight's Cross of the Iron Cross 1939–1945 — The Owners of the Highest Award of the Second World War of all Wehrmacht Branches] (in German). Friedberg, Germany: Podzun-Pallas. ISBN 978-3-7909-0284-6.
- Scherzer, Veit (2007). Die Ritterkreuzträger 1939–1945 Die Inhaber des Ritterkreuzes des Eisernen Kreuzes 1939 von Heer, Luftwaffe, Kriegsmarine, Waffen-SS, Volkssturm sowie mit Deutschland verbündeter Streitkräfte nach den Unterlagen des Bundesarchives [The Knight's Cross Bearers 1939–1945 The Holders of the Knight's Cross of the Iron Cross 1939 by Army, Air Force, Navy, Waffen-SS, Volkssturm and Allied Forces with Germany According to the Documents of the Federal Archives] (in German). Jena, Germany: Scherzers Militaer-Verlag. ISBN 978-3-938845-17-2.
- Thomas, Franz (1997). Die Eichenlaubträger 1939–1945 Band 1: A–K [The Oak Leaves Bearers 1939–1945 Volume 1: A–K] (in German). Osnabrück, Germany: Biblio-Verlag. ISBN 978-3-7648-2299-6.

Military offices
Preceded by SS-Obergruppenführer Theodor Eicke	Commander of 3. SS-Panzer Division Totenkopf; 7 July 1941 – 15 July 1941	Succeeded by SS-Obergruppenführer Georg Keppler
Preceded by SS-Obergruppenführer Wilhelm Bittrich	Commander of 2. SS-Division Das Reich; 1 January 1942 – 19 April 1942	Succeeded by SS-Obergruppenführer Georg Keppler
Preceded by SS-Obergruppenführer Karl-Maria Demelhuber	Commander of 6. SS-Gebirgs-Division Nord; 1 April 1942 – 20 April 1942	Succeeded by SS-Oberführer Hans Scheider
Preceded by SS-Obergruppenführer Hans Scheider	Commander of 6. SS-Gebirgs-Division Nord; 1 June 1942 – 15 December 1943	Succeeded by SS-Gruppenführer Lothar Debes
Preceded by none	Commander of VII. SS-Armeekorps; 1 May 1943 – 1 June 1943	Succeeded by absorbed into IV. SS-Panzerkorps
Preceded by SS-Obergruppenführer Walter Krüger	Commander of IV. SS-Panzerkorps; 1 June 1944 – 20 June 1944	Succeeded by SS-Brigadeführer Nikolaus Heilmann
Preceded by none	Commander of XI. SS-Armeekorps; 1 August 1944 – 30 April 1945	Succeeded by none
Preceded by SS-Obergruppenführer Georg Keppler	Commander of III.(germanische) SS-Panzerkorps; 4 February 1945 – 11 February 1945	Succeeded by Generalleutnant Martin Unrein
