= Helmut Dörner =

SS officer

- Born: 26 June 1909; Mönchengladbach, German Empire
- Died: 11 February 1945 (aged 35); Budapest, Hungary
- Military career
- Allegiance: Nazi Germany
- Branch: Waffen-SS
- Service years: 1939–1945
- Rank: SS-Oberführer
- Conflicts: Siege of Budapest †
- Awards: Knight's Cross of the Iron Cross with Oak Leaves and Swords

Helmut Dörner (26 June 1909 in Mönchengladbach – 11 February 1945 in Budapest) was a German commander in the Waffen-SS of Nazi Germany during World War II. He was a recipient of the Knight's Cross of the Iron Cross with Oak Leaves and Swords. During World War II, he was awarded both classes of the Iron Cross during the Battle of France. Dörner stayed with the Polizei division until late 1943, and was then transferred to Greece. When Karl Schümers (divisional commander) was killed, Dörner took over the command until the arrival of the new commander. In September 1944 the 4th SS Polizei Division was sent to Rumania and Hungary. During the siege of Budapest, he became the commander of a mixed battle group and died during a breakthrough attempt.

== Awards ==
- Wound Badge in Black (2 October 1941)
- Infantry Assault Badge in Silver (2 October 1941)
- Iron Cross 2nd Class (14 June 1940) & 1st Class (19 June 1940)
- German Cross in Gold on 24 December 1941 as Hauptmann in the 14./Polizei-Schützen-Regiment 2
- Knight's Cross of the Iron Cross with Oak Leaves and Swords
  - Knight's Cross on 15 May 1942 as SS-Sturmbannführer and commander of the II./SS-Polizei-Schützen-Regiment 2
  - 650th Oak Leaves on 16 November 1944 as SS-Standartenführer and commander of SS-Panzergr.-Regiment 8
  - 129th Swords on 1 February 1945 as SS-Oberführer and leader of a Kampfgruppe in the 4. SS-Polizei-Panzergrenadier-Division
