= 22nd SS Volunteer Cavalry Division =

German cavalry division

- 22. SS-Freiwilligen-Kavallerie-Division; 22. SS-Önkéntes-Lovashadosztály
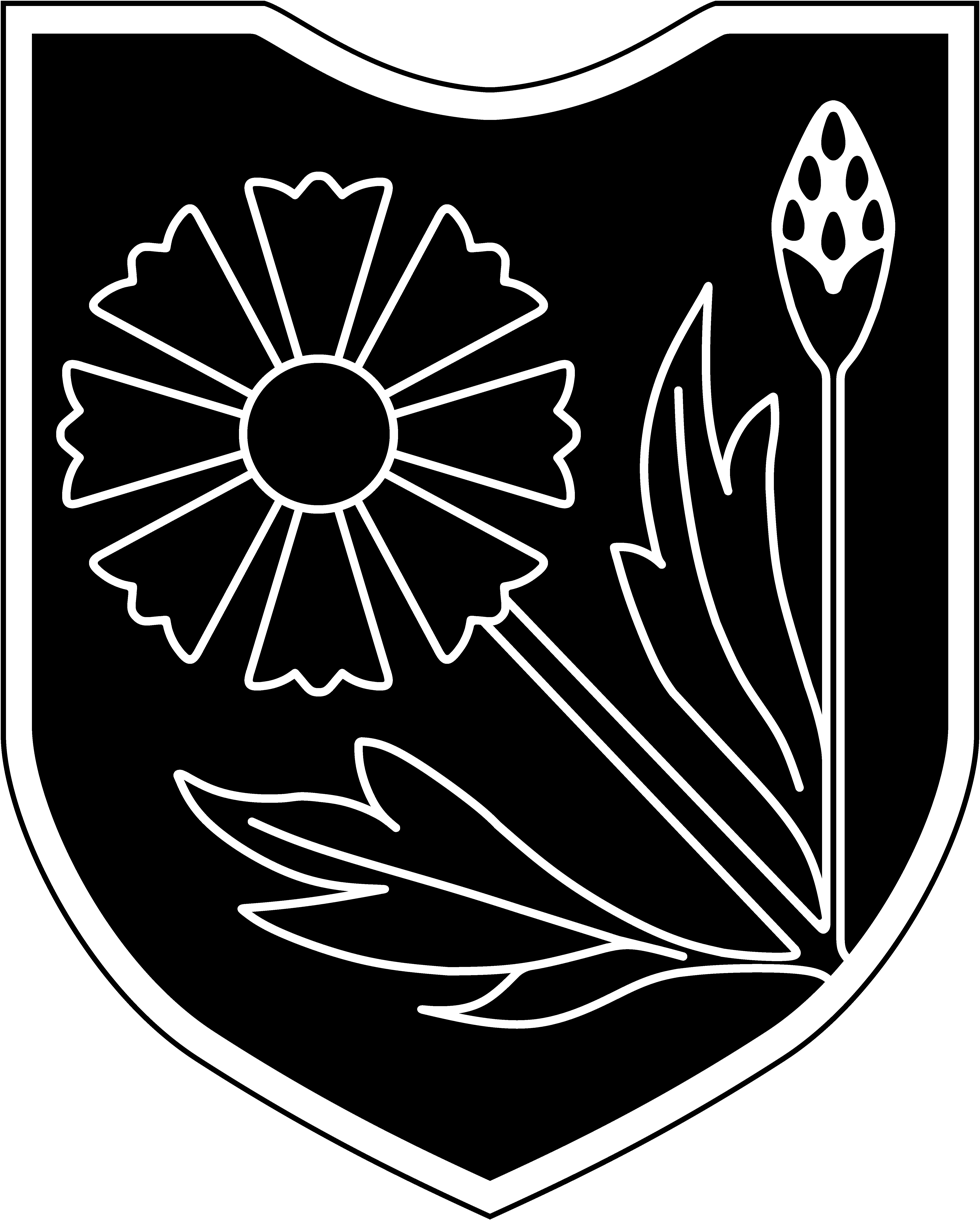
- Divisional insignia of the 22nd SS Volunteer Cavalry Division, used as early as October 1944.
- Active: 29 April 1944 – 14 February 1945
- Country: Nazi Germany
- Branch: Waffen-SS
- Type: Grenadier
- Role: Cavalry
- Size: 12,453 (20 September 1944); 13,911 (25 October 1944); 11,345 (26 December 1944)
- Part of: IX SS Mountain Corps; III Panzer Corps
- Garrison/HQ: Bicske, Budapest, Győr, Kisbér, Rétság and Zsámbék.
- Nicknames: 'Maria Theresia' (Hungarian: 'Mária Terézia')
- Motto: "Meine Ehre heißt Treue!"
- Engagements: Second World War; Eastern Front; Operation Panzerfaust; Budapest Offensive; Siege of Budapest; Operation Konrad

Commanders
- Notable commanders: SS-Brigadeführer, August Zehender

The 22nd SS Volunteer Cavalry Division (German: 22. SS-Freiwilligen Kavallerie-Division) (Hungarian: 22. SS-Önkéntes-Lovashadosztály) was a German Waffen-SS cavalry division which was active on the Eastern Front during World War II. The division was composed primarily of Royal Hungarian Army Volksdeutsche conscripts who were transferred to the Waffen-SS following an agreement between Germany and Hungary. The division is commonly known under the Maria Theresia name in publications, although no documents have been found to confirm this name.

== History ==
=== Formation and Training ===
In December 1943, the 17th SS-Cavalry Regiment from the 8th SS Cavalry Division Florian Geyer was ordered to become the cadre for a new SS cavalry division. On 29 April 1944, the SS-Führungshauptamt authorised the division to be raised on basis of the 17th SS-Cavalry Regiment. The unit was sent to Kisbér in Hungary to begin forming the new division. While personnel from the Florian Geyer formed the nucleus of the division, the bulk of the troops were Hungarian Volksdeutsche (ethnic German) conscripts, transferred to the Waffen-SS following an agreement between Germany and Hungary.

The division was designated the 22nd SS Volunteer Cavalry Division Maria Theresia. The title referred to Maria Theresa, who had ruled Austria, Hungary and Bohemia in the 18th century. The symbol of the division, a cornflower, was emblazoned on the divisional shield. In official documents the division was always referred-to only as the "22. SS-Freiw.-Kav.-Div.", and there are no records that would confirm it being officially named Maria Theresia. Although the division supposedly received this name in late 1944, it does not appear in surviving Feldpostübersicht (field-post/unit directories), official order of battles, or other archival files.

Over the next months, the division continued its organization and training in Kisber, Győr and Budapest, equipped with mostly Hungarian weapons, vehicles and equipment. By June 1944, the divisional strength reached 4,900. In early August Oberkommando des Heeres (OKH) ordered all divisions forming up in Hungary to send units to the combat zone. The 52nd SS Volunteer Cavalry Regiment entrained for the front in Romania, while the 17th SS Volunteer Cavalry Regiment remained in Hungary to train the rest of the division.

The division suffered from poor morale because most of its conscripts did not sympathize with Germany and could not speak German. The minority of Hungarian Volksdeutsche who saw Nazi Germany as their fatherland had already volunteered in 1941–1942. In the spring of 1944, when the conscripts were transferred to the Waffen-SS, the majority of them preferred to serve in the Hungarian Army.

=== Romania ===
Kampfgruppe Wiedemann consisted of SS Volunteer Cavalry Regiment 52 with attached artillery, Flak and reconnaissance elements. The Kampfgruppe was transported from Gyula-Szalonta, Hungary to Arad, Romania, where it was attached to General der Panzertruppe Hermann Breith's III Panzer Corps, stationed in the area around Debrecen. Elements of the division went into the line on 30 September, forming a defensive ring around the city of Arad along with the Hungarian 9th Infantry Division.

On 2 October, the Soviet spearheads of Marshal Rodion Malinovsky's 2nd Ukrainian Front began probing towards Arad. On 6 October, Malinovsky launched a major offensive, thus beginning the Battle of Debrecen. Units of the division were quickly outflanked and encircled. The second echelon of Soviet forces sought to destroy the pocket; on 8 October it was split in two. One unit broke out however, with troops swimming across the Harmas river to German lines on the other side.

=== Operation Panzerfaust - Budapest ===
In mid-October 1944, pro-German Honvédség officers had revealed that the Hungarian Regent, Admiral Miklós Horthy, was negotiating a secret surrender to the Soviets. Hitler sent SS-Obersturmbannfüher Otto Skorzeny to deal with the problem. Skorzeny commandeered all available elements of the 22nd SS to take part in Operation Panzerfaust, which began at 0600 on 15 October. In little over half an hour, a German column led by four Tiger IIs, including a number of 22nd SS men, stormed Buda Castle and forced Horthy to abdicate. Simultaneously, Operation Panzerfaust resulted in the forced detainment of Horthy's youngest son, the pro-peace Nicholas Horthy. Pro-German Arrow Cross leader Ferenc Szálasi replaced Horthy, negotiations were broken off and Hungary remained in the war.

The battle-ready units of the division were assigned to the IX SS Mountain Corps, which was deployed in Budapest. The division arrived in early November 1944 and took up defensive positions on the Atilla Line near Pest. By November 1944, the division was described as "totally demoralized" and assessed as having the lowest combat value of all the German divisions encircled during the Siege of Budapest. Soldiers of the 22nd SS were the most frequent deserters. The division was destroyed in Budapest, along with the rest of the IX SS Mountain Corps and Hungarian forces encircled in the Hungarian capital.

== Order of Battle, Budapest Jan 1945 ==
- 52nd SS Cavalry Regiment
- 53rd SS Cavalry Regiment
- 54th SS Cavalry Regiment
- 17th SS Cavalry Regiment
- 22nd SS Artillery Regiment
- 22nd SS Panzer Reconnaissance Battalion
- 22nd SS Panzer Jäger Battalion
- 22nd SS Pionier Battalion
- 22nd SS Nachrichten Battalion
- 22nd SS Division Nachschubtruppen
- 22nd SS Verwaltungstruppen Battalion
- 22nd SS Sanitäts Battalion

== See also ==
- List of Waffen-SS units
- Ranks and insignia of the Waffen-SS
- Waffen-SS foreign volunteers and conscripts
- List of military units named after people
