= Nikolaus Heilmann =

German general

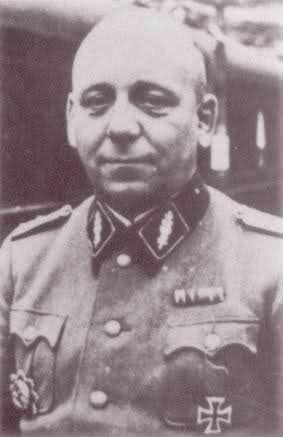
- Born: 20 April 1903; Schlüchtern, German Empire
- Died: 30 January 1945 (aged 41); Altdamm, Nazi Germany
- Military career
- Allegiance: Nazi Germany
- Branch: Waffen-SS
- Service years: 1939–1945
- Rank: SS-Brigadeführer
- Unit: 15th Waffen Grenadier Division of the SS (1st Latvian)
- Conflicts: World War II; Eastern Front; Eastern Allied invasion of Germany (KIA)
- Awards: Knight's Cross of the Iron Cross

Nikolaus Heilmann (20 April 1903 – 30 January 1945) was a high-ranking commander in the Waffen-SS during World War II. He was a recipient the Knight's Cross of the Iron Cross of Nazi Germany.

Born in 1903, Heilmann joined the police force in 1925. In May 1939 he joined the SS (SS service number 327324) and at the start of World War II, he was posted to the SS Polizei Division and served during the occupation of France and the Low Countries. In June 1943, he was promoted to Standartenführer and appointed chief of staff to the IV SS Panzer Corps whose entire staff was transferred to the VI SS Army Corps.

He remained on the Army staff until February 1944 when he was given command of the 15th Waffen Grenadier Division of the SS (1st Latvian) and promoted to Oberführer. He was transferred to command the 14th Waffen Grenadier Division of the SS (1st Galician) in August 1944, when he was wounded and also awarded the Knight's Cross. He returned to command the 15th SS in January 1945. He was killed in action on 4 January 1945 and posthumously promoted to the rank of Brigadeführer.

== Awards ==
- Knight's Cross of the Iron Cross on 23 August 1944 as SS-Oberführer and commander of the 15th Waffen-Grenadier-Division of the SS

== Bibliography ==
- Scherzer, Veit (2007). Die Ritterkreuzträger 1939–1945 Die Inhaber des Ritterkreuzes des Eisernen Kreuzes 1939 von Heer, Luftwaffe, Kriegsmarine, Waffen-SS, Volkssturm sowie mit Deutschland verbündeter Streitkräfte nach den Unterlagen des Bundesarchives [The Knight's Cross Bearers 1939–1945 The Holders of the Knight's Cross of the Iron Cross 1939 by Army, Air Force, Navy, Waffen-SS, Volkssturm and Allied Forces with Germany According to the Documents of the Federal Archives] (in German). Jena, Germany: Scherzers Militaer-Verlag. ISBN 978-3-938845-17-2.
