= VII SS Panzer Corps =

VII SS Army Corps
- VII. SS-Panzerkorps
- Active: 3 October 1943 – 30 June 1944
- Country: Nazi Germany
- Branch: Waffen-SS

Commanders
- Notable commanders: Matthias Kleinheisterkamp

The VII SS Panzer Corps was an armoured corps of the Waffen-SS during World War II which never took part in hostilities. On 30 June 1944, the corps was merged into the IV SS Panzer Corps.

== History ==
The headquarters of the VII SS Panzer Corps were established on 3 October 1943 in the training camp in Morhange (north-eastern France). The new corps was intended to include the 10th SS Panzer Division "Frundsberg" and the 17th SS Panzergrenadier Division "Götz von Berlichingen". Both divisions were still in training.

At the end of December 1943, SS-Gruppenführer Matthias Kleinheisterkamp was commissioned to lead the corps, but in February 1944 he was also given command of the III (Germanic) SS Panzer Corps. Without the presence of a commander, staff personnel were transferred to other units. In February 1944, the staff only consisted of 1 officer and 1 non-commissioned officer. In March 1944, the 10th SS Panzer Division was relocated to the Eastern Front. After the Allied landings in Normandy, the 17th SS Panzergrenadier Division was added to the 7th Army.

In May 1944, Kleinheisterkamp returned to the corps and was formally appointed commander. He restarted building the staff, but on 30 June 1944 the staff was merged with the IV SS Panzer Corps, also led by Kleinheisterkamp.

== Corps commanders ==
- May 25, 1944 – June 30, 1944: SS-Obergruppenführer Matthias Kleinheisterkamp

== Sources ==
- This is a translation of an article in the Dutch Wikipedia, VII SS Korps.

As of July, 2023, the Dutch article about this subject is named nl:VII SS Pantserkorps.
