= IX SS Mountain Corps =

- Active: 21 June 1944 – 12 February 1945
- Country: Germany
- Branch: Waffen-SS
- Type: Gebirgsjäger
- Role: Mountain warfare
- Size: Corps
- Engagements: World War II; Eastern Front

Commanders
- Notable commanders: SS-Gruppenführer Karl-Gustav Sauberzweig; SS-Obergruppenführer Karl Pfeffer-Wildenbruch

The IX Waffen Mountain Corps of the SS (Croatian) (German: IX. Waffen-Gebirgskorps der SS (Kroatisches)), later simply IX SS Mountain Corps, was a Waffen-SS corps during World War II. Originally set up to command Croatian and Albanian SS divisions, it also commanded a variety of other German and Hungarian units of the Waffen-SS. It saw action on the Eastern Front between July 1944 and January 1945 when it was virtually destroyed during the Siege of Budapest.

== History ==
The corps was raised on 21 June 1944 in Bácsalmás, Hungary as a command formation for the 13th Waffen Mountain Division of the SS "Handschar" (1st Croatian) and the 23rd Waffen Mountain Division of the SS "Kama" (2nd Croatian) under the command of SS-Gruppenführer Karl-Gustav Sauberzweig. The 13th SS Division was not initially transferred to the corps, being involved in fighting against the Yugoslav Partisans in the Independent State of Croatia. In August, due to high rates of desertion from the 13th SS Division, Sauberzweig proposed to disarm the Bosnians in both the 13th and 23rd SS Divisions, but Heinrich Himmler instead opted to transport the 2,000 Bosnians of the 23rd SS Division from Hungary to Bosnia and reorganise the remaining troops of both divisions there, with key support units from the 13th SS Division centralised under the IX SS Mountain Corps, which would also move to Bosnia from Hungary.

By September 1944, the Red Army had advanced to the border of Hungary, which placed the corps training area close to the front lines. Kama was not ready for combat and was disbanded; its volunteers went to strengthen the Handschar and the 31st SS Volunteer Grenadier Division. In mid-September, the corps was strengthened by several combat divisions, including the Handschar and went into action against the Yugoslav Partisans.

In October, the corps was moved to the frontline in Hungary, where it took command of four combat divisions, the 13th Panzer Division, the 60th Panzergrenadier Division "Feldherrnhalle", the 8th SS Cavalry Division "Florian Geyer", and the 22nd SS Volunteer Cavalry Division. All these divisions had been involved in the recent heavy fighting around Debrecen. Between them, the divisions barely had 60 tanks.

As all subordinate units were now Germanic, the corps was redesignated as the IX SS Mountain Corps. The renamed corps was ordered to form a part of the 6th Army, defending the approaches to Budapest.

On 24 November 1944, the corps staff arrived in Budapest, the combat divisions already in action against the advancing Soviet forces. After a month's heavy fighting, the corps was encircled in the city. The corps was placed in command of all encircled German units, and Karl Pfeffer-Wildenbruch was placed in command. Having spent his career as a police commander, Pfeffer-Wildenbruch lacked even a basic military understanding, and as the 6th Army commander Hermann Balck said "At best, one could say that Budapest was being led by a politician". Pfeffer-Wildenbruch established his corps command centre on Castle Hill, in the centre of the Hungarian Government District, and ordered the encircled forces to attempt breakouts, which they were unable to accomplish. A rescue effort was being assembled by Balck's army group.

On 1 January 1945, the IV SS Panzer Corps launched Operation Konrad I, the first in a series of relief attempts. After initial gains, the assault stalled. Konrad II followed, which reached to within sight of the city before being halted by stubborn Soviet defences.

By 17 January, the remainder of the corps along with the Hungarian I Corps, commanded by General Iván Hindy, were evacuated across the Danube to Buda. The final relief effort, Konrad III, was halted on 28 January. By this stage, the Axis forces in Buda had been pushed into a one square kilometer pocket. On 11 February, the corps was ordered to attempt a breakout. Only 785 troops were able to reach the German lines, including 170 Waffen-SS men. On 12 February, the remainder of the corps was destroyed, with small groups of men, including Pfeffer-Wildenbruch and his staff, surrendering to the Soviets.

== Commanders ==
- SS-Gruppenführer Karl-Gustav Sauberzweig (1 June – mid-November 1944)
- SS-Obergruppenführer Karl Pfeffer-Wildenbruch (mid-November 1944 – 11 February 1945)

== Orders of battle ==
16 September 1944 – Croatia

- Corps staff
  - 109th SS Corps Signals Battalion
  - 509th SS Mountain Artillery Regiment
  - 509th SS Observation Battery
  - 509th SS Flak Battalion
  - 509th SS Military Police Troop
  - SS Kampfgruppe Dörner
- 118th Jäger Division
- 7th SS Mountain Division "Prinz Eugen"
- 369th (Croatian) Infantry Division
- 13th Waffen Mountain Division of the SS "Handschar" (1st Croatian)

26 December 1944 – Budapest

- Corps staff
  - 509th SS Mountain Artillery Regiment
  - 509 SS Heavy Observation Battalion
  - 509th SS Flak Battalion
  - 509th SS Military Police Troop
- 8th SS Cavalry Division "Florian Geyer"
- 22nd SS Volunteer Cavalry Division
- 13th Panzer Division
- 60th Panzergrenadier Division "Feldherrnhalle"
- 271st Infantry Division
  - 12th Flaksturm Regiment
  - 4th SS Police Regiment
  - 4 x ad hoc infantry battalions (comprising surviving elements from other units)
