= Distomo massacre =

Mass-killing in Distomo, Nazi-occupied Greece

Coordinates: 38°26′00″N 22°40′00″E

- German troops in front of buildings set ablaze in Distomo, during the massacre.
- Location: Distomo, Kingdom of Greece (under German-occupation)
- Date: 10 June 1944
- Deaths: 228 civilians
- Perpetrators: Karl Schümers, Fritz Lautenbach; 4th SS Polizei Panzergrenadier Division

The Distomo massacre (Greek: Σφαγή του Διστόμου; German: Massaker von Distomo or the Distomo-Massaker) was a Nazi war crime which was perpetrated by members of the Waffen-SS in the village of Distomo, Greece, in 1944, during the German occupation of Greece during World War II.

== Background ==
The 2nd company of the 4th Waffen-SS Polizei Panzergrendier Division was serving in Greece in 1944, mostly formed of volksdeutsche (ethnic German) teenagers from Hungary and Romania. It was commanded by zealous SS officers. The heavy losses taken on the Eastern Front had caused the SS to lower its standards as the war went on and many of the teenagers in the company were underaged with some as young as 14 or 15. British historian Mark Mazower described the 2nd Company as being made up of a "lethal combination" of ill-trained volksdeutsche teenagers determined to prove their sense of deutschtum (Germanness) with fanatical SS officers. This was especially the case as almost all of the Hungarian and Romanian volksdeutsche teenagers serving in the division did not have the requisite family histories proving that they were of pure German descent, and instead had only vague written statements from their local volksdeutsche community associations attesting to their pure German descent. These statements were not considered satisfactory by the SS, which noted that though the volksdeutsche serving in the SS were German in terms of language and culture, they suspected many had Hungarian and/or Romanian blood.

The commanding officer of the division, SS-Brigadeführer Fritz Schmedes had taken part as a young Freikorps officer in the "vicious fighting" in Upper Silesia in 1921 and fought the Greeks in precisely the same manner that he had fought the Poles. The regimental commander, SS-Standartenführer Karl Schümers, was an ultra-aggressive man prone to "extremely draconian" methods, as even a sympathetic SS evaluation had put it, whose zeal and aggression had not been curbed by a serious head wound he had taken on the Eastern Front in 1942. SS-Hauptsturmführer Fritz Lautenbach began his career in the elite 1st SS Panzer Division Leibstandarte SS Adolf Hitler and was known to be a militant Nazi. However, Mazower wrote that, though the composition of the division and its cast of commanders made it more likely to commit atrocities, the massacre should be put into context - namely it operated as part of Army Group E and the standing orders of the Wehrmacht in Greece was to use terror as a way to frighten the Greeks into not supporting the andartes (guerrillas).

The main andarte force that fought the Germans during the war was the ELAS (Ellinikós Laïkós Apeleftherotikós Stratós – Greek People's Liberation Army), which was the military arm of the EAM (Ethnikó Apeleftherotikó Métopo – National Liberation Front), which was dominated by cadres of the KKE (Kommounistikó Kómma Elládas – Communist Party of Greece). Throughout the war against the Soviet Union, German propaganda portrayed the war as a noble struggle to protect "European civilization" from "Bolshevism". Likewise, German officials portrayed the Reich as nobly occupying Greece to protect it from Communists and presented EAM as a demonic force. The andartes, especially those of the ELAS, were portrayed in both the Wehrmacht and the SS as "savages" and "criminals" who committed all sorts of crimes and who needed to be hunted down without mercy.

The British engaged in numerous intelligence deceptions designed to fool the Germans into thinking that the Allies would be landing in Greece in the near-future, and as such Army Group E was reinforced to stop the expected Allied landing in the Balkans. From the viewpoint of General Alexander Löhr, the commander of Army Group E, the attacks of the andartes, which forced his men to spread themselves out to hunt them down, were weakening his forces by leaving them exposed and spread out in the face of an expected Allied landing. However, the mountainous terrain of Greece ensured that there were only a limited number of roads and railroads bringing down supplies from Germany and even the destruction of a single bridge by the andartes caused major supply problems for German forces. The best known andarte operation of the war, namely the blowing up of the Gorgopotamos viaduct on the night of 25 November 1942, had caused the Germans serious logistical problems as it severed the main railroad linking Thessaloniki to Athens. To secure its supply lines, Army Group E had to eliminate the andartes, but at the same time, the sweeps designed to eliminate the swift moving and lightly armed andarte bands forced Army Group E to spread its force out thinly, which would have been dangerous had the Allies landed in Greece. After the failure of numerous sweeps designed to hunt down the andartes over the course of 1942–1943, Lohr in the winter of 1943–1944 started to employ what Mazower called "indiscriminate slaughter of civilians" as the best way to fight the andartes.

== The massacre ==
On 10 June 1944, for over two hours, Waffen-SS troops of the 2nd company, I/7 battalion, 4th SS Polizei Panzergrenadier Division under the command of the 26-year-old SS-Hauptsturmführer Fritz Lautenbach went door to door and massacred Greek civilians as part of "savage reprisals" for a partisan attack upon the unit's convoy.

A Greek housewife living in Distomo in a postwar affidavit known only as Nitsa N. stated on the afternoon of 10 June, she saw the Waffen-SS drive into the village and they immediately shot down everyone they saw on the streets. She reported that one of the SS kicked in the door to her house and shot down her husband and her children in the kitchen. Other accounts mentioned that 2nd company engaged extensively in rape, looting, and mutilation. A Greek schoolgirl known as Sofia D. reported that she was with her father and brother working the fields outside of the village when they saw smoke rising up to blacken the sky. Sofia D. reported that her father told the children to stay in the field while he headed back for their mother. While heading away from Distomo, Sofia and her brother encountered Waffen-SS men on a truck headed towards the village and both were shot down as they attempted to run away.

A total of 228 men, women and children were killed in Distomo, a small village near Delphi. Approximately 40 of the victims were children and 20 infants. According to survivors, SS forces "bayoneted babies in their cribs, stabbed pregnant women, and beheaded the village priest." However, another source ("Life, The First Decade", Time Inc., 1979, p. 138. LCCN 79-88091) refers to "the 1,000 citizens slaughtered by the Germans". An appalled Red Cross team from Athens which arrived at the ruins of Distomo a few days later reported seeing mutilated bodies hanging from the trees all along the road to Distomo.

Following the massacre, a Secret Field Police agent, Georg Koch, accompanying the German forces informed the authorities that, contrary to Lautenbach's official report, the German troops had come under attack several miles from Distomo and had not been fired upon "with mortars, machine-guns and rifles from the direction of Distomo". Following a complaint from the collaborationist Hellenic State regime of Ioannis Rallis to Hermann Neubacher of the Auswärtiges Amt, an investigation was opened. As a diplomat, Neubacher was concerned at maintaining the increasingly shaky Rallis government whose authority was collapsing by 1944. An inquiry was convened. As Lautenbach was operating under the command of the Army Group E at the time of the massacre, the inquiry was conducted by Wehrmacht officers, not SS officers. Lautenbach admitted that he had gone beyond standing orders, but the tribunal found in his favour, holding that he had been motivated, not by negligence or ignorance, but by a sense of responsibility towards his men.

== Legal proceedings ==
Four relatives of victims brought legal proceedings against the German government to court in Livadeia, Greece, demanding reparations. On October 30, 1997, the court ruled in favour of the plaintiffs and awarded damages of 28 million Euros. Eventually in May 2000, the Supreme Civil and Criminal Court of Greece, confirmed this ruling. The judgment, however, could not be enforced in Greece because, as necessary under Greek law, the execution of a judgment against a sovereign state is subject to the prior consent of the Minister of Justice, which was not given.

The plaintiffs brought the case to court in Germany, demanding the aforementioned damages be paid to them. The claim was rejected at all levels of German court, citing the 1961 bilateral agreement concerning enforcement and recognition of judgements between Germany and Greece, and Section 328 of the German Code of Civil Procedure. Both required that Greece have jurisdiction, which it does not as the actions in question were sovereign acts by a state. According to the fundamental principles of international law, each country is immune from another state's jurisdiction.

In November 2008, an Italian court ruled that the plaintiffs could take German property in Italy as compensation that was awarded by the Greek courts. The plaintiffs were awarded a villa in Menaggio, near Lake Como, which is owned by a German state nonprofit organization, as part of the restitution.

In December 2008, the German government filed a claim at the International Court of Justice in the Hague. The German claim was that the Italian courts should have dismissed the case under the international law of sovereign immunity.

In January 2011, the Prime Minister of Greece, George Papandreou, announced that the Greek Government would be represented at the International Court of Justice in relation to the claim for reparations by relatives of victims. In its 2012 final judgement, the court ruled that Italy had violated Germany's state immunity, and directed that the judgment by the Italian courts be retracted. In 2014 the Italian Constitutional Court ruled that sovereign immunity for crimes such as Distomo violated the core rights guaranteed by the Italian constitution. Sovereign immunity would therefore no longer be applicable law in Italy for the war crimes cases in question. New claims for compensation for the Distomo massacre could therefore be brought before Italian courts.

== In film ==
A Song for Argyris is a 2006 documentary film that details the life story of Argyris Sfountouris, a survivor of the massacre.

The massacre is described in Peter Nestler's experimental documentary Von Griechenland (1966).

== Memorial ==
A monument was built in the 1980s outside the city to remember the lives lost.

== See also ==
- List of massacres in Greece
- Hellmuth Felmy
- Krupki massacre
- Marzabotto massacre
- Massacre of Kalavryta
- The 200 of Kaisariani
- Oradour-sur-Glane massacre, which occurred on the same date
- Sant'Anna di Stazzema massacre
- Szczurowa massacre
- Ivanci massacre

== Books ==
- Mazower, Mark (1993). Inside Hitler's Greece: The Experience of Occupation, 1941–44. New Haven: Yale University Press. ISBN 0300089236.
