= August Dieckmann =

Waffen-SS officer (1912-1943)

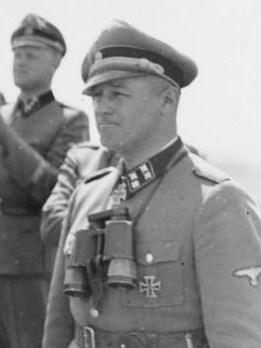
- Born: 29 May 1912; Cuxhaven
- Died: 10 October 1943 (aged 31) at the Dnieper
- Military career
- Allegiance: Nazi Germany
- Branch: Waffen SS
- Service years: 1934–43
- Rank: SS-Standartenführer (posthumous)
- Service number: NSDAP #4,455,713; SS #183,917
- Units: I./SS-Rgt "Germania"; SS-PzGrenRgt 10 "Westland"
- Conflicts: World War II
- Awards: Knight's Cross of the Iron Cross with Oak Leaves and Swords

August Hinrich Dieckmann (29 May 1912 – 10 October 1943) was a commander in the Waffen-SS of Nazi Germany during World War II. He was a recipient of the Knight's Cross of the Iron Cross with Oak Leaves and Swords.

== Awards ==
- SS Degen (13 September 1936)
- Iron Cross (1939) 2nd Class (28 September 1939) & 1st Class (3 June 1940)
- German Cross in Gold on 28 February 1942 as SS-Sturmbannführer in the I./SS-Regiment "Germania"
- Knight's Cross of the Iron Cross with Oak Leaves and Swords
  - Knight's Cross on 23 April 1942 as SS-Sturmbannführer and commander of the I./SS-Regiment "Germania"
  - 233rd Oak Leaves on 16 April 1943 as SS-Sturmbannführer and commander of the I./SS-Panzergrenadier-Regiment "Germania"
  - 39th Swords on 10 October 1943 (posthumous) as SS-Obersturmbannführer and commander of SS-Panzergrenadier-Regiment 10 "Westland"
