= VI SS Army Corps =

VI SS Army Corps (Latvian)
- Active: 1943–45
- Country: Nazi Germany
- Branch: Waffen-SS
- Size: Corps
- Engagements: World War II

Commanders
- Notable commanders: Karl Pfeffer-Wildenbruch

VI SS Volunteer Army Corps (Latvian) (German: VI. SS-Freiwilligen-Armeekorps (Lettisches)), was a corps of the Waffen-SS during World War II. It was formed in October 1943 to command the Latvian Waffen-SS divisions. It fought in the northern sector of the Eastern Front as part of the 18th Army. They were part of Army Group North until early 1945, when it was subordinated to Army Group Courland. In October 1944, they were encircled by the Red Army and spent the remainder of the war in the Courland Pocket, until they surrendered at the end of the war.

== Commanders ==
- SS-Obergruppenführer Karl Pfeffer-Wildenbruch (8 Oct 1943 – 11 June 1944)
- SS-Obergruppenführer Friedrich Jeckeln (11 June – 21 July 1944)
- SS-Gruppenführer Karl Fischer von Treuenfeld (21–25 July 1944)
- SS-Obergruppenführer Walther Krüger (25 July 1944 – 8 May 1945)

== Area of operations ==
- Eastern Front, Northern Sector (October 1943 – September 1944)
- Latvia (September 1944 – May 1945)

== Order of battle ==
- Corps staff
  - 106th SS Signals Battalion
  - 506th SS Nebelwerfer Battalion
  - 506th Heavy SS Artillery Ranging Battery
  - 106/506th SS Flak Battalion
  - VI SS Corps Pioneer Company
  - VI SS Corps Lehr Battalion
  - 106th SS Transport Company
  - 106th SS Feldgendarmerie Company
- 15th Waffen Grenadier Division of the SS (1st Latvian)
- 19th Waffen Grenadier Division of the SS (2nd Latvian)
