= Walter Krüger (SS general) =

German Waffen-SS commander, SS-Obergruppenführer

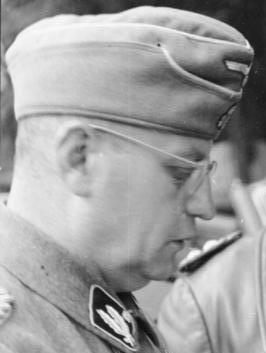
- Krüger in 1941
- Born: 27 February 1890; Straßburg, Alsace-Lorraine, German Empire
- Died: 22 May 1945 (aged 55); Liepāja, Ostland
- Cause of death: Suicide
- Military career
- Allegiance: German Empire; Weimar Republic; Nazi Germany
- Branch: Imperial German Army; Freikorps; Reichswehr; Waffen-SS
- Service years: 1908–1920; 1935–1945
- Rank: SS-Obergruppenführer
- Service number: SS #266,184
- Commands: SS Division Das Reich; VI SS Army Corps (Latvian)
- Conflicts: World War I; World War II
- Awards: Knight's Cross of the Iron Cross with Oak Leaves and Swords

Walter Krüger (27 February 1890 – 22 May 1945) was a German Waffen-SS general during the Nazi era. In World War II, he commanded the SS Division Polizei, the SS Division Das Reich, and the VI SS Army Corps (Latvian). At the end of the war, Krüger committed suicide.

== Career ==
Born in Straßburg in the German Empire (today Strasbourg, France), Krüger was the son of an army officer. He was the older brother of Friedrich-Wilhelm Krüger, who also became a high-ranking SS general. Krüger attended cadet school and, as a young officer, joined an artillery regiment during World War I. After the war, he joined the paramilitary Freikorps and fought in the Baltic region during 1919.

From 1933, Krüger worked in the Reichswehr and Wehrmacht training department. In 1935, he joined the SS-Verfügungstruppe and served as an instructor at the SS officer school at the SS-Junker School Bad Tölz.

During World War II, he earned the Knight's Cross of the Iron Cross after taking command of the SS Division Polizei, which fought on the Leningrad front. Krüger became commander of the SS Division Das Reich in March 1943. After that, he went on to become the inspector general of infantry troops of the Waffen-SS. He was then posted to the VI SS Army Corps (Latvian), a paper command. On 22 May 1945^{[a]}, Krüger committed suicide in the Courland Pocket fourteen days after the surrender of Nazi Germany.

== Awards ==
- Iron Cross (1939) 2nd Class (13 June 1940) & 1st Class (22 June 1940)
- Knight's Cross of the Iron Cross with Oak Leaves and Swords
  - Knight's Cross on 13 December 1941 as commander of the SS Polizei Division
  - Oak Leaves on 31 August 1943 as commander of SS Division Das Reich
  - Swords on 11 January 1945 as commanding general of the VI SS Army Corps

Military offices
Preceded by SS-Oberführer Kurt Brasack	Commander of SS Division Das Reich; 29 March 1943 – 23 October 1943	Succeeded by SS-Brigadeführer Heinz Lammerding
Preceded by SS-Obergruppenführer Alfred Wünnenberg	Commander of IV. SS-Panzerkorps; 23 October 1943 – 1 July 1944	Succeeded by SS-Obergruppenführer Matthias Kleinheisterkamp
