= Alfred Wünnenberg =

German Nazi, SS Police official, and SS-Obergruppenführer (1891–1963)

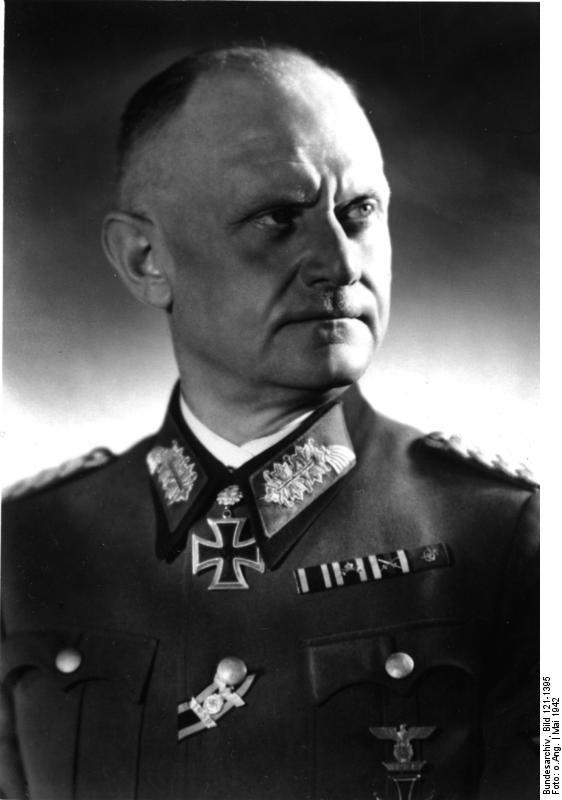
- Wünnenberg in 1942

Chief of Order Police
- In office 31 August 1943 – 8 May 1945
- Leader: Heinrich Himmler as Chief of German Police; Karl Hanke as Chief of German Police
- Preceded by: Kurt Daluege
- Succeeded by: Office abolished

Personal details
- Born: 20 July 1891 Saarburg, Alsace-Lorraine, German Empire
- Died: 30 December 1963 (aged 72) Krefeld, West Germany

Military service
- Allegiance: German Empire; Weimar Republic; Nazi Germany
- Branch/service: Imperial German Army; Prussian Army; Reichswehr; Schutzstaffel; Waffen-SS; Ordnungspolizei
- Years of service: 1913–1945
- Rank: SS-Obergruppenführer and General of the Waffen-SS and Police
- Unit: IV SS Panzer Corps; SS Polizei Division
- Battles/wars: World War I World War II
- Awards: Knight's Cross of the Iron Cross with Oak Leaves

Alfred Wünnenberg (20 July 1891 – 30 December 1963) was a high-ranking commander in the Waffen-SS and the police of Nazi Germany. He commanded the SS Polizei Division between December 1941 and June 1943. He was a recipient of the Knight's Cross of the Iron Cross with Oak Leaves. On 10 June 1943, he was moved to command the IV SS Panzer Corps, where he remained until 31 August. That same year he became chief of the Ordnungspolizei (Orpo; uniformed police). After the war, Wünnenberg was interned in Dachau, Bavaria, but was released in 1947. He was a infantry soldier in the Prussian Army from 1913–1919 and an officer in the Reichsheer from 1921–1930s, and later became an officer and General in the Orpo and Waffen-SS during the 1940s.

== Awards and decorations ==
- Iron Cross (1914) 2nd Class (10 February 1915) & 1st Class (9 September 1915)
- Clasp to the Iron Cross (1939) 2nd Class (18 June 1940) & 1st Class (21 August 1941)
- Knight's Cross of the Iron Cross with Oak Leaves
  - Knight's Cross on 15 November 1941 as SS-Standartenführer and Oberst of the Schupo, and commander of SS-Polizei-Schützen-Regiment 3
  - Oak Leaves on 23 April 1942 as SS-Brigadeführer and Generalmajor of the Police, and commander of SS-Polizei-Division

== Ranks in the Orpo and SS ==
- Oberfuhrer (senior colonel or brigadier); 1940–1941
- Brigadefuhrer (brigadier-general or major-general); 1941–1942
- Gruppenfuhrer (major-general or Lt-general); 1942–1943
- Obergruppenführer (Lt-general or general); 1943–1945

== See also ==
- List SS-Obergruppenführer

Military offices
Preceded by none	Commander of IV. SS-Panzerkorps; 5 August 1943 – 23 October 1943	Succeeded by SS-Obergruppenführer Walter Krüger
Preceded by SS-Oberstgruppenführer und Generaloberst der Polizei Kurt Daluege	Commander of the Ordnungspolizei; 23 October 1943 – 23 May 1945	Succeeded by None
