= Herbert Gille =

German Waffen-SS commander, SS-Obergruppenführer (1897–1966)

Herbert Otto Gille
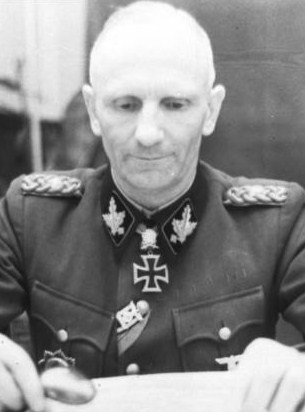
- Born: 8 March 1897; Bad Gandersheim, Lower Saxony, German Empire
- Died: 26 December 1966 (aged 69); Stemmen, Lower Saxony, West Germany
- Military career
- Allegiance: German Empire; Weimar Republic; Nazi Germany
- Branch: German Army; Waffen-SS
- Service years: 1914–1919; 1934–1945
- Rank: SS-Obergruppenführer and General of the Waffen-SS
- Commands: SS Division Wiking; IV SS Panzerkorps
- Conflicts: World War I World War II
- Awards: Knight's Cross of the Iron Cross with Oak Leaves, Swords and Diamonds
- Other work: HIAG, Waffen-SS lobby group

Herbert Otto Gille (8 March 1897 – 26 December 1966) was a high-ranking German SS general, and divisional & corps commander of the Waffen-SS. He commanded the SS Division Wiking during World War II. After the war, Gille became active in HIAG, a lobby group and a negationist veteran's organisation founded by former high-ranking Waffen-SS personnel in West Germany in 1951.

== Career ==
Gille served in World War I and was awarded the Iron Cross First and Second Classes. Gille joined the Nazi Party and the SS in 1931. In 1934 he joined the SS combat support forces. As the commander of a battalion in an SS-V regiment, Gille participated in the invasion of Poland and in the western campaign. In 1940 he was appointed a regimental commander in the SS Division Wiking, led by Felix Steiner.

With his regiment, Gille participated in the Operation Barbarossa in 1941 and in advance to Kuban in 1942; he received the Knight's Cross on 8 October 1942. He then took command of the Wiking Division on the Eastern Front. Early in 1944, Gille participated in the breakout of the Group Stemmermann from the Korsun-Cherkassy Pocket. Gille received the diamonds to his Knight's Cross with Oak Leaves and Swords on 19 April 1944. In January 1945 Gille, as leader of the IV SS Panzer Corps, participated in a failed attempt to relieve the encircled German and Hungarian troops in the Battle of Budapest. In March 1945 he led the IV SS Panzer Corps in the failed Lake Balaton Offensive. He surrendered to the U.S. forces in Austria. Gille was a recipient of the Knight's Cross of the Iron Cross with Oak Leaves, Swords and Diamonds, making him the most highly decorated Waffen-SS member of the war.

== Activities within HIAG ==
Gille was released in 1948. In the early 1950s, Gille became active in HIAG, a lobby group and a revisionist veteran's organisation founded by former high-ranking Waffen-SS personnel in West Germany to campaign for their legal, economic and historical rehabilitation. Gille, alongside Felix Steiner, Otto Kumm and Paul Hausser, became an early leading figure within HIAG. In 1951 Gille launched the periodical Wiking-Ruf ("Viking Call"). Initially it was aimed at the veterans of the SS Division Wiking. Within its first year of existence, in 1952, it became the official publication of HIAG and was eventually renamed to Der Freiwillige ("The Volunteer").

Gille faced his share of controversy with the organisation. In 1952, HIAG held its first major meeting in Verden. It began respectably, with Gille announcing that the veterans were ready to 'do their duty for the Fatherland' and Steiner declaring support for 'freedom, order and justice'. But the next speaker delivered a different message. Former paratroop general Hermann-Bernhard Ramcke, who had been invited to demonstrate so-called solidarity with the Wehrmacht, condemned the Western Allies as the 'real war criminals' and insisted that the blacklist on which all former SS members then stood would soon become "a list of honor". The outburst caused a furor within West Germany. Periodicals as far as the U.S. and Canada carried headlines Hitler's Guard Cheers Ex-chief and Rabble-Rousing General Is Worrying the Allies, with the latter article reporting that Ramcke's speech had been greeted with "roars of approval and cries 'Eisenhower, Schweinehund!' ("Eisenhower, pig-dog")."

Internal disagreements began to emerge within HIAG in the mid-1950s as to the stance of the organisation: Steiner and Gille favored a more political, outspoken orientation, while the rest of the leadership favored a moderate approach so as not to jeopardize HIAG's goals of legal and economic rehabilitation, which, in their opinion, could only come from the establishment. Gille died in 1966.

== Awards ==
- German Cross in Gold on 28 February 1942 as SS-Oberführer in SS-Artillerie-Regiment 5
- Knight's Cross of the Iron Cross with Oak Leaves, Swords and Diamonds
  - Knight's Cross on 8 October 1942 as commander of SS-Artillerie-Regiment 5 "Wiking"
  - 315th Oak Leaves on 1 November 1943 as commander of SS-Panzergrenadier-Division "Wiking"
  - 47th Swords on 20 February 1944 as commander of SS-Panzergrenadier-Division "Wiking"
  - 12th Diamonds on 19 April 1944 as commander of 5th SS-Panzer-Division "Wiking"

Military offices
Preceded by SS-Obergruppenführer Felix Steiner	Commander of 5. SS-Panzer-Division Wiking; 1 May 1943 – 6 August 1944	Succeeded by SS-Oberführer Eduard Deisenhofer
Preceded by SS-Brigadeführer Nikolaus Heilmann	Commander of IV. SS-Panzerkorps; 6 August 1944 – 8 May 1945	Succeeded by dissolved on 8 May 1945
