= Operation Konrad =

1945 Axis operation near Budapest, Hungary

Operation Konrad was the German-Hungarian effort to relieve the encircled garrison of Budapest during the Battle of Budapest in January 1945. The operation was divided into three parts:

- Operation Konrad I - 1 January 1945 - Led by IV SS Panzer Corps from Tata. Halted near Bicske.
- Operation Konrad II - 7 January 1945 - Led by IV SS Panzer Corps from Esztergom. Halted at Pilisszentkereszt.
- Operation Konrad III - 17 January 1945 - Led by IV SS Panzer Corps and III Panzer Corps from south of Budapest near Székesfehérvár. Attempt to encircle ten Soviet divisions. Halted south of Ercsi.

== See also ==
- 1st Panzer Division - Part of relief force
- IV SS Panzer Corps - Part of relief force
- III Panzer Corps - Part of relief force
- IX SS Mountain Corps - Besieged in Budapest
- Hungarian Third Army - Besieged in Budapest
