= Karl Schümers =

German police commander

- Born: 17 October 1905; Düsseldorf, German Empire
- Died: 16 August 1944 (aged 38); Árta, German-occupied Greece
- Military career
- Allegiance: Nazi Germany
- Branch: Waffen-SS
- Service years: 1939–1944
- Rank: SS-Brigadeführer
- Unit: SS Polizei Division
- Conflicts: World War II
- Awards: Knight's Cross of the Iron Cross

Karl Schümers (17 October 1905 – 16 August 1944) was a high-ranking commander in the Waffen-SS and Ordnungspolizei (police) of Nazi Germany during World War II. He commanded the SS Polizei Division in July – August 1944 and was directly or indirectly involved in many of the major atrocities committed in Greece during 1944. He was awarded the Knight's Cross of the Iron Cross on 30 September 1942.

== War-time atrocities ==
- On 5 April 1944, Schümers commanded the 7th unit of the 4th SS Polizei Panzergrenadier Division in the execution of 277 unarmed women, children and elders in the village of Kleisoura in Greece in retaliation for the killing of 3 German soldiers. In the official investigations by his command hierarchy for the massacre he testified that his soldiers had to kill them all because guerrilla forces were hiding in the village, and was acquitted, while it was proven after the war that his testimony was false.
- On 24 April his 7th unit committed the Pyrgoi massacre where 368 men, women, and children were killed.
- Men from the same 7th unit, under the command of Hans Zampel and Fritz Lautenbach committed the Distomo massacre, on 10 June 1944, where 228 civilians were killed in retaliation. No one was tried for this war crime.
- On 17 June 1944 Schümers ordered the execution of 28 civilians and destruction of Ipati, and the next day, the burning down of Spercheiada and the killing of 35 civilians.
- After he was assigned the command of the 4th Panzer Grenadier Division, on 22 July 1944, the 8th unit of his forces took part in the operation Kreuzotter (5-31 August 1944) in a failed attempt to eradicate ELAS bases from the mountains of central Greece, Roumeli, Greece, that resulted, among others, in the killing of approximately 170 civilians and the partial or complete destruction of dozens of villages and cities.

He was killed on 16 August 1944 when his car drove over a landmine in the area of Arta (northwestern Greece).

== Commands ==
- II.Battalion, 7th SS Polizei Panzer Grenadier Regiment
- 7th SS Panzer Grenadier Regiment
- 4th SS Polizei Panzer Grenadier Division

=== Further reading ===
- Fellgiebel, Walther-Peer (2000) [1986]. Die Träger des Ritterkreuzes des Eisernen Kreuzes 1939–1945 — Die Inhaber der höchsten Auszeichnung des Zweiten Weltkrieges aller Wehrmachtteile [The Bearers of the Knight's Cross of the Iron Cross 1939–1945 — The Owners of the Highest Award of the Second World War of all Wehrmacht Branches] (in German). Friedberg, Germany: Podzun-Pallas. ISBN 978-3-7909-0284-6.
- Mitcham, Samuel W (2007). Retreat to the Reich : the German defeat in France, 1944. Mechanicsburg, PA: Stackpole Books. ISBN 978-0-8117-3384-7.
