= Karl Pfeffer-Wildenbruch =

German Waffen-SS commander, SS-Obergruppenführer

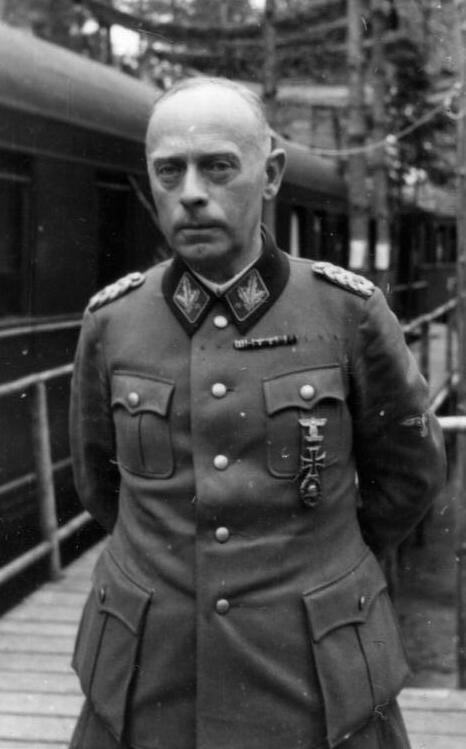
- Pfeffer-Wildenbruch in 1943
- Born: 12 June 1888; Kalkberge, German Empire
- Died: 29 January 1971 (aged 82); Bielefeld, West Germany
- Military career
- Allegiance: German Empire; Weimar Republic; Nazi Germany
- Branch: Imperial German Army; Ordnungspolizei; Waffen-SS
- Service years: 1907–1945
- Rank: SS-Obergruppenführer
- Units: 4th SS Polizei Division; VI SS Army Corps (Latvian); IX SS Mountain Corps
- Conflicts: World War I World War II
- Awards: Knight's Cross of the Iron Cross with Oak Leaves

Karl Pfeffer-Wildenbruch (12 June 1888 – 29 January 1971) was a German SS and police (Ordnungspolizei) official during the Nazi era, who served on the personal staff of Heinrich Himmler, head of the SS. During World War II, he commanded the SS Division Polizei, VI SS Army Corps (Latvian) and the IX SS Mountain Corps of the Waffen-SS; he was awarded the Knight's Cross of the Iron Cross with Oak Leaves.

== Career ==
Born in 1888, Karl Pfeffer-Wildenbruch joined the army in 1907 and served in World War I. He joined the German General Staff, and served as a military attaché to the German military mission in Constantinople and as a staff officer with the 11th Infantry Division. At the end of the war, he remained on the General staff of the ZBV 55 and XXIV reserve corps. In August 1919 Pfeffer-Wildenbruch joined the police service and spent time in the Reich Ministry of the Interior. He became the police commander in Osnabrück and Magdeburg. In 1928 he went to Santiago de Chile, to serve as Chief of the Chilean Carabineros de Chile.

In June 1933, Pfeffer-Wildenbruch became an Oberstleutnant in the National Police Regiment at Frankfurt an der Oder and from May 1936 he was the Inspector General of Police schools, being promoted to Generalmajor in the Ordnungspolizei (uniformed police) in May 1937. In March 1939 Pfeffer-Wildenbruch joined the SS (No. 292 713) and served on the Personal Staff Reichsführer-SS, command staff of Heinrich Himmler, head of the SS. At the end of 1939, following the invasion of Poland, Pfeffer-Wildenbruch was given command of the 4th SS Polizei Division with the rank of SS-Gruppenführer. After the Battle of France he returned to the staff of the Reichsführer-SS, serving as chief of the colonial police from 1941 to 1943.

In October 1943, Pfeffer-Wildenbruch was appointed commander of the newly formed VI SS Army Corps (Latvian), a paper command over the two Latvian Waffen-SS divisions. He was promoted to SS-Obergruppenführer und General der Waffen-SS und Polizei. In December 1944 Pfeffer-Wildenbruch was appointed commander of the IX SS Mountain Corps, stationed in Budapest, Hungary. He was in command of the German forces during the Battle of Budapest from 24 December 1944 to 11 February 1945. Pfeffer-Wildenbruch was awarded the Knight's Cross on 11 January 1945 and the Oak Leaves on 1 February 1945. During the attempt to break out from Budapest, he was seriously wounded and was taken prisoner by the Soviet forces. On 10 August 1949 he was sentenced to 25 years. In 1955, he was released together with some 10,000 other prisoners of war and war criminals due to an informal agreement concluded in September 1955 between German Chancellor Konrad Adenauer and Soviet Premier Nikolai Bulganin. Pfeffer-Wildenbruch was killed in a traffic accident on 29 January 1971 at Bielefeld.

== Awards ==
- Iron Cross (1914) 1st Class (14 September 1917)
- Clasp to the Iron Cross (1939) 2nd Class (20 June 1940) & 1st Class (22 June 1940)
- Knight's Cross of the Iron Cross with Oak Leaves
  - Knight's Cross on 11 January 1945 as SS-Obergruppenführer and General of the Waffen-SS and commanding general of the IX. SS-Gebrigskorps
  - 723th Oak Leaves on 1 February 1945 as SS-Obergruppenführer and General of the Waffen-SS and commanding general of the IX. Waffen-Gebrigskorps of the SS
