= 4th SS Polizei Panzergrenadier Division =

German armored division

- 4. SS-Polizei-Panzergrenadier-Division
- Divisional insignia
- Active: 1939–45
- Country: Nazi Germany
- Branch: Waffen-SS
- Type: Infantry; Panzergrenadier
- Size: Division

Commanders
- Notable commanders: Karl Pfeffer-Wildenbruch; Alfred Wünnenberg; Karl Schümers

The 4th SS Polizei Panzergrenadier Division (German: 4. SS-Polizei-Panzergrenadier-Division) or SS Division Polizei was one of the thirty-eight divisions fielded as part of the Waffen-SS during World War II.

== Formation ==
The division was formed in October 1939, when thousands of members of the Ordnungspolizei (Orpo) were drafted to fill the ranks of the new SS division. These men were not enrolled in the SS and remained policemen, retaining their Orpo rank structure and insignia. They did not have to meet the racial and physical requirements imposed for the SS. Himmler's purpose in forming the division was to get around the recruitment caps the Wehrmacht had succeeded in placing on the SS, it also provided a means for his policemen to satisfy their military obligation and avoid army conscription.

The first commander was Generalleutnant der Polizei (Major-General) Karl Pfeffer-Wildenbruch, a career police commander who had been a general staff officer during World War I; simultaneous with his appointment he was also commissioned as an SS-Gruppenführer. The division was equipped largely with captured Czech materiel and underwent military training in the Black Forest combined with periods on internal security duties in Poland.

== France 1940 ==
The division, at this time an infantry formation with horse-drawn transport, was held in reserve with Army Group C in the Rhineland during the Battle of France until 9 June when it first saw combat during the crossing of the Aisne river and the Ardennes Canal. The division was engaged in heavy fighting and after securing its objectives, moved to the Argonne Forest, where it came into contact with the French and fought a number of actions with their rear guard. In late June 1940, the division was pulled out of combat and transferred to the reserve of Army Group North in East Prussia.

In January 1941, administrative responsibility for the division passed from the police to the SS-Führungshauptamt (SS operations office), the materiel and training headquarters for the Waffen-SS; its personnel however, remained policemen, not members of the SS.

== Eastern Front ==
During the invasion of the Soviet Union (Operation Barbarossa), the division was initially part of the reserve within Army Group North. In August 1941, the division saw action near Luga. During heavy fighting for the Luga bridgehead the division lost over 2,000 soldiers including the commander, Arthur Mülverstadt. After a series of failed attacks in swampy and wooded terrain, the division, along with army formations, fought its way into the northern part of Luga, encircling and destroying the Soviet defenders.

In January 1942, the division was moved to the Volkhov River sector, and on 24 February it was transferred to the Waffen-SS; its personnel changing their police insignia to that of the SS. The formation was involved in heavy fighting between January and March which resulted in the destruction of the Soviet 2nd Shock Army during the Battle of Lyuban. The remainder of the year was spent on the Leningrad front.

== 1943 ==
In February 1943, the division saw action south of Lake Ladoga and was forced to retreat to a new defensive line at Kolpino where it was successful in holding the Red Army, despite suffering heavy casualties.

It was at this point that units of the division were transferred to the west to retrain and upgrade to a Panzergrenadier division; leaving a small Kampfgruppe (battlegroup) in the east and a Dutch Volunteer Legion, the Niederland, to make up the numbers. The Kampfgruppe was disbanded in May 1943, when the division became operational. The division's training battalion participated in the suppression of the Warsaw Ghetto Uprising. The division was sent to Greece where it engaged in Nazi security warfare in the northern part of the country.

== 1944 and Distomo massacre ==
The division remained in Greece until August 1944 before being recalled to face the advancing Red Army at Belgrade. It again suffered heavy losses.

While in Greece, the division committed war crimes and atrocities against the civilian population while undertaking anti-partisan operations. In particular they were responsible for the Kleisoura massacre and the Distomo massacre; the latter being one of the worst atrocities committed by the Waffen-SS during World War II. On June 10, 1944, for over two hours, troops of the division under the command of Fritz Lautenbach went door to door and massacred Greek civilians in retaliation for a Greek Resistance attack upon the unit. A total of 214 men, women and children were killed in Distomo, a small village near Delphi. According to survivors, SS men "bayoneted babies in their cribs, stabbed pregnant women, and beheaded the village priest."

Elements of this division committed atrocities in the mountains of central Greece ("Ρούμελη") during May and June 1944 that resulted in the destruction of Sperchiada and the massacre of 28 civilians in Ipati. The division later participated in Operation Kreuzotter (5–31 August 1944), an attempt to eradicate Greek People's Liberation Army (ELAS) bases from the same mountains. The operation was a military failure, but resulted in the killing of 170 civilians and the partial or complete destruction of dozens of villages and cities.

The division was moved to Serbia in September 1944, and was stationed outside Belgrade to defend the Danube on the Belgrade-Timisoara-Arad line against Soviet advances in Transylvania. After the capture of Debrecen by the 2nd Ukrainian Front, the division was forced to withdraw to Senta and Sannicolau Mare on 6 October 1944, and eventually destroying the Tisza bridge crossings and withdrawing to Szeged, on 9 October.

After Soviet successes on the Tisza's east bank, 4th SS was ordered to cover Soviet movements against the west bank of the Tisza and hold Szolnok, which fell to the Soviets at the start of the Budapest Offensive on 4 November. Committing to a fighting retreat north, 4th SS pulled west of Jászberény on 12 November, only for the city to fall on 14 November, retreating further to Hatvan; falling to the Soviet forces on 25 November. 4th SS dug in further north of Hatvan. They had however, taken heavy casualties, with only 800 men and 13 functional armoured assault guns available for defensive operations, and starting 5 December, a very strong Soviet advance pierced 6 kilometres deep behind the German lines north of the village of Szucsi, allowing the 2nd Ukrainian Front to enter the Cserhát mountain range by 15 December. Facing extreme casualties on the Bátonyterenye line, much of the division withdrawn to the then Slovak-Hungarian border at Čebovce; arriving between 27–28 December, with the units suffering the worst casualty rates withdrawing to Banská Bystrica. Only 450 men and 3 heavy guns were available at Čebovce, which facing three Soviet rifle divisions became the scene of heavy fighting; where the village changed hands many times. After the loss of the village's highlands on 31 December, 4th SS was fully withdrawn to Slovakia, and eventually back to Germany, with any remaining forces fighting with 1st Panzer Army.

== 1945 ==
The depleted division was moved to a front line north in Pomerania. Hitler assigned it to Army Detachment Steiner for the relief of Berlin. They were supposed to be part of the northern pincer that would meet the IV Panzer Army coming from the south and envelop the 1st Ukrainian Front before destroying it. Steiner explained to General Gotthard Heinrici that he did not have the divisions to perform this action and the troops lacked the heavy weapons needed, so the attack did not take place as Hitler had planned. Moved to Danzig, the SS-Polizei Division was encircled by the Red Army and was shipped across the Hela Peninsula to Swinemünde. After a brief rest, what remained of the division fought its way across the Elbe river, in order to surrender to the Americans near Wittenberge-Lenzen.

== Commanders ==
- Karl Pfeffer-Wildenbruch (15 November 1939 – 1 September 1940)
- Konrad Ritzer (1 September 1940 – 8 September 1940)
- Karl Pfeffer-Wildenbruch (8 September 1940 – 10 November 1940)
- Arthur Mülverstadt (10 November 1940 – 10 August 1941)
- Emil Höring (16 August 1941 – 18 August 1941)
- Walter Krüger (18 August 1941 – 15 December 1941)
- Alfred Wünnenberg (15 December 1941 – 14 May 1942)
- Alfred Borchert (15 May 1942 – 18 July 1942) - for Alfred Wünnenberg
- Alfred Wünnenberg (19 July 1942 – 10 June 1943)
- Fritz Schmedes (10 June 1943 – 5 July 1943)
- Otto Binge (5 July 1943 – 18 August 1943)
- Fritz Freitag (18 August 1943 – 20 October 1943)
- Friedrich-Wilhelm Bock (20 October 1943 – 19 April 1944)
- Jürgen Wagner (19 April 1944–? May 1944)
- Friedrich-Wilhelm Bock (? May 1944–7 May 1944)
- Hebert Ernst Vahl (7 May 1944 – 22 July 1944)
- Karl Schümers (22 July 1944 – 16 August 1944)
- Helmut Dörner (16 August 1944 – 22 August 1944)
- Fritz Schmedes (22 August 1944 – 27 November 1944)
- Walter Harzer (27 November 1944 – 1 March 1945)
- Fritz Göhler (1 March 1945–? March 1945)
- Walter Harzer (? March 1945–8 May 1945)

== Order of battle ==
Area of operations

- Germany (September 1939–May 1940)
- Luxembourg, Belgium & France (May 1940 – June 1941)
- Eastern front, northern sector (June 1941–May 1943)
- Czechoslovakia and Poland (May 1943–January 1944)
- Greece (January 1944–September 1944)
- Yugoslavia and Romania (September 1944–October 1944)
- Hungary (October 1944–December 1944)
- Czechoslovakia and Eastern Germany (December 1944–May 1945)

1939

- Polizei-Schützen-Regiment 1
- Polizei-Schützen-Regiment 2
- Polizei-Schützen-Regiment 3
- Polizei-Panzerjäger (anti-tank) Battalion
- Polizei-Pionier (Engineer) Battalion
- Radfahr (Bicycle) Company
- Artillerie Regiment 300
- Nachrichten (Signals) Battalion 300
- Versorgungstruppen 300 (Supply Unit)

1943

- SS-Panzergrenadier Regiment 7
- SS-Panzergrenadier Regiment 8
- SS-Artillerie Regiment 4
- SS-Panzer Battalion 4
- SS-Sturmgeschütz (Assault gun) Battalion 4
- SS-Panzerjäger (Anti-tank) Battalion 4
- SS-Flak (Anti-aircraft) Battalion 4
- SS-Nachrichten (Signals) Battalion 4
- SS-Panzer-Aufklärungs (Armoured Reconnaissance) Battalion 4
- SS-Pionier (Engineer) Battalion 4
- SS-DiNA Divisions-Nachschub-Abteilung (Divisional Supply Battalion) 4
- SS-Panzer-Instandsetzungs (Maintenance) Battalion 4
- SS-Wirtschafts Battalion 4 - (no direct translation, but it concerns the administration of captured equipment, property and so on)
- SS-Sanitäts (Medical) Battalion 4
- SS-Polizei-Veterinär-Kompanie 4
- SS-Kriegsberichter (War Reporter) Platoon 4
- SS-Feldgendarmerie (Military Police) Troop 4
- SS-Ersatz (Replacement) Battalion 4

== Manpower strength ==
- June 1941 = 17,347
- December 1942 = 13,399
- December 1943 = 16,081
- June 1944 = 16,139
- December 1944 = 9,000

== See also ==
- List of Waffen-SS divisions
