= List of Knight's Cross of the Iron Cross recipients of the Waffen-SS =

The Knight's Cross of the Iron Cross (German: Ritterkreuz des Eisernen Kreuzes) and its variants were the highest award in the military and paramilitary forces of Nazi Germany. During World War II, 457 servicemen of the Waffen-SS, including volunteers and conscripts from Belgium, Croatia, Denmark, Estonia, France, Hungary, Latvia, Netherlands and Norway, received the Knight's Cross of the Iron Cross. Of these, 411 presentations were formally made and evidence of the award is available in the German Federal Archives. One recipient, Hermann Fegelein, was court-martialed and executed on 29 April 1945. According to German law he was deprived of rank and all awards previously. Fegelein must therefore be considered a de facto but not de jure recipient. A further 46 Knight's Cross, 8 Knight's Cross with Oak Leaves and 4 Knight's Cross with Oak Leaves and Swords recipients are either lacking the evidence to sustain their listings or received the award under questionable legal terms. All of them were accepted by the Association of Knight's Cross Recipients (Ordensgemeinschaft der Ritterkreuzträger des Eisernen Kreuzes e.V.) as legitimate recipients.

The Oberkommando der Wehrmacht kept separate Knight's Cross lists, one for each of the three military branches, Heer (Army), Kriegsmarine (Navy), Luftwaffe (Air force) and for the Waffen-SS. Within each of these lists, a unique sequential number was assigned to each recipient. The same numbering paradigm was applied to the higher grades of the Knight's Cross, one list per grade.

== Background ==
The Knight's Cross of the Iron Cross and its higher grades were based on four separate enactments. The first enactment, Reichsgesetzblatt I S. 1573 of 1 September 1939 instituted the Iron Cross (Eisernes Kreuz), the Knight's Cross of the Iron Cross and the Grand Cross of the Iron Cross (Großkreuz des Eisernen Kreuzes). Article 2 of the enactment mandated that the award of a higher class be preceded by the award of all preceding classes. As the war progressed, some of the recipients of the Knight's Cross distinguished themselves further and a higher grade, the Oak Leaves to the Knight's Cross of the Iron Cross, was instituted. The Oak Leaves, as they were commonly referred to, were based on the enactment Reichsgesetzblatt I S. 849 of 3 June 1940. In 1941, two higher grades of the Knight's Cross were instituted. The enactment Reichsgesetzblatt I S. 613 of 28 September 1941 introduced the Knight's Cross of the Iron Cross with Oak Leaves and Swords and the Knight's Cross of the Iron Cross with Oak Leaves, Swords and Diamonds. At the end of 1944 the final grade, the Knight's Cross of the Iron Cross with Golden Oak Leaves, Swords, and Diamonds, based on the enactment Reichsgesetzblatt 1945 I S. 11 of 29 December 1944, became the final variant of the Knight's Cross authorized.

== Recipients ==
The list is initially sorted alphabetically.

This along with the * (asterisk) indicates that the Knight's Cross was awarded posthumously.
This along with the ? (question mark) indicates that author Veit Scherzer has expressed doubt regarding the veracity and formal correctness of the listing.

Name	Rank	Role and unit (Note: For an explanation of the various naming schemes used by the Luftwaffe, Heer, Kriegsmarine and Waffen-SS refer to nomenclature used by the Wehrmacht and Waffen-SS.)	Date of award	Notes	Image
Miervaldis Ādamsons	SS-Untersturmführer	Chief of the 6./Waffen Grenadier-Regiment 44 (lettische Nr. 6) der SS	25 January 1945	—	—
Hermann Alber	SS-Sturmmann	Company messenger in the 9./SS-Panzergrenadier-Regiment 20 "Hohenstaufen"	16 December 1944*	Killed in action 2 August 1944	—
Anton Ameiser	SS-Sturmbannführer of the Reserves	Leader of SS Freiwilligen-Kavallerie-Regiment 52 "Ungarn"	1 November 1944	—	—
Roberts Ancāns	Waffen-Untersturmführer	Leader of Waffen Feld Ersatz-Bataillon der SS Nr. 19 (Note: According to Scherzer as leader of the Divisionskampfschule (divisions combat school) of the 19. Waffen-Grenadier-Division of the SS (lettische Nr. 2).)	25 January 1945	—	—
Günther Anhalt	SS-Standartenführer and Oberst of the Schupo	Commander of SS-Polizei-Regiment 2	12 August 1944	Killed in action 27 April 1945	—
Žanis Ansons	Waffen-Hauptscharführer	Zugführer (platoon leader) in the 3./Waffen Grenadier-Regiment 44 der SS (Note: According to Scherzer as Zugführer (platoon leader) in the 3./Waffen Grenadier-Regiment 44 der SS (lettische Nr. 6).)	16 January 1945	—	—
Karlis Aperats	Waffen-Obersturmbannführer	Commander of Waffen-Grenadier-Regiment 32 (lettische Nr. 1) der SS	21 September 1944	Suicide after severe wounds 15 July 1944	
Josef Armberger	SS-Obersturmführer	Chief of the 8./SS-Panzer-Regiment 1 "Leibstandarte SS Adolf Hitler"	31 October 1944*	Killed in action 20 August 1944	—
Karl Auer	SS-Hauptsturmführer	Leader of the I./SS-Polizei-Panzergrenadier-Regiment 8	31 October 1944	—	—
Franz Augsberger	SS-Brigadeführer and Generalmajor of the Waffen-SS	Commander of the 20. Waffen-Grenadier-Division der SS (estnische Nr. 1)	8 March 1945	Killed in action 19 March 1945	
Adolf Ax? (Note: Adolf Ax's nomination shows no indication that the request had been processed or granted, not even an entry date is noted. The nomination list indicates that the request was filed on 28 April 1945. A Heerespersonalamt (HPA—Army Staff Office) nomination with the number 5092 had been created. The nomination, according to the book "Verliehene Ritterkreuze" (Awarded Knight Crosses), was forwarded to the HPA on 25 April 1945. No proof exists that the Knight's Cross was awarded. The Order Commission of the Association of Knight's Cross Recipients (AKCR) processed this case in 1981 and decided: "Knight's Cross yes, 9 May 1945". Ax was member of the AKCR.)	SS-Oberführer	Leader of the 15. Waffen Grenadier-Division der SS (lettische Nr. 1)	9 May 1945	—	—
Erich von dem Bach-Zelewski	SS-Obergruppenführer and General of the Police	Commanding general of the Korpsgruppe "von dem Bach" in Warsaw (Note: According to Scherzer as commanding general of the Korpsgruppe "von dem Bach".)	30 September 1944	—	A man wearing a military uniform, glasses and neck order, in the shape of a cross. He has short hair that is combed back and a determined facial expression.
Christian Bachmann	SS-Hauptsturmführer	Leader of the II./SS-Panzergrenadier-Regiment 5 "Totenkopf" (Note: According to Scherzer as leader of the II./SS-Panzergrenadier-Regiment 5.)	28 February 1945	Killed in action 13 March 1945	—
Erwin Bachmann	SS-Obersturmführer (Note: According to Scherzer as SS-Obersturmführer of the Reserves.)	Adjutant of the I./SS-Panzer-Regiment 10 "Frundsberg"	10 February 1945	—	—
Josef Bachmeier	SS-Hauptsturmführer	Leader of the II./Freiwilligen-SS-Panzergrenadier-Regiment 23 "Norge" (Note: According to Scherzer as leader of the II./SS-Panzergrenadier-Regiment 23 "Norge" (Norwegian Nr. 1).)	23 August 1944	—	—
Ernst Barkmann	SS-Unterscharführer	Panzer commander in the 4./SS-Panzer-Regiment 2 "Das Reich" (Note: According to Scherzer as panzer commander in the 4./SS-Panzer-Regiment 2.)	27 August 1944	—	—
Heinrich Bastian? (Note: No evidence of the award can be found in the German Federal Archives. The award was unlawfully presented by SS-Oberstgruppenführer Sepp Dietrich. The date is taken from the announcement made by the 6. SS-Panzerarmee. Bastian was a member of the Association of Knight's Cross Recipients (AKCR).)	SS-Obersturmführer	Leader of the II./SS-Panzergrenadier-Regiment 3 "Deutschland"	6 May 1945	—	—
Karl Bastian	SS-Hauptsturmführer	Leader of the II./SS-Panzergrenadier-Regiment 21	23 August 1944*	Killed in action 11 August 1944	—
Hans Bauer	SS-Obersturmführer	Leader of the 3./SS-Panzergrenadier-Bataillon 506	5 April 1945	—	—
Helmut Bauer	SS-Oberscharführer	Zugführer (platoon leader) in the 3./SS-Panzer-Regiment 5 "Wiking" (Note: According to Scherzer as Zugführer (platoon leader) in the 3./SS-Panzer-Regiment 5.)	12 September 1943	—	—
Otto Baum	SS-Sturmbannführer	Commander of the III./SS-"Totenkopf"-Infanterie-Regiment 3	8 May 1942	Awarded 277th Oak Leaves 22 August 1943; 95th Swords 2 September 1944	—
Willi Baumann	SS-Sturmbannführer	Quartiermeister (quartermaster general) of the XI. SS-Armeekorps and leader of a Kampfgruppe	27 January 1945	—	—
Wilhelm Beck	SS-Obersturmführer (Note: According to Scherzer as SS-Obersturmführer of the Reserves and leader of the 2./SS-Panzer-Regiment "Leibstandarte SS Adolf Hitler".)	Leader of the 2./SS-Panzer-Regiment 1 "Leibstandarte SS Adolf Hitler"	28 March 1943	Killed in action 10 June 1944	—
Hans Becker	SS-Hauptsturmführer	Chief of the 2./SS-Panzerzgrenadier-Regiment 2 "Leibstandarte SS Adolf Hitler"	28 March 1943	Killed in action 20 August 1944	—
Hellmuth Becker	SS-Standartenführer	Commander of SS-Panzergrenadier-Regiment 6 "Theodor Eicke" (Note: According to Scherzer as commander of SS-Panzergrenadier-Regiment "Theodor Eicke".)	7 September 1943	Awarded 595th Oak Leaves 21 September 1944	
Klemens Behler	SS-Obersturmführer	Chief of the 3./SS-Artillerie-Regiment 54 "Nederland" (Note: According to Scherzer as chief of the 3./SS-Artillerie-Regiment 54.)	17 March 1945	—	—
Georg-Robert Besslein	SS-Obersturmbannführer	Commander of SS-Festungs-Regiment 1 "Beßlein" in the Festung Breslau (fortress Breslau) (Note: According to Scherzer as commander of SS-Regiment "Besslein"/Festung Breslau (fortress Breslau).)	30 April 1945	—	—
Walter Bestmann	SS-Sturmbannführer	Commander of Aufklärungs-Abteilung "Totenkopf" (Note: According to Scherzer as commander of SS-"Totenkopf"-Aufklärungs-Abteilung (motorized).)	28 September 1941	—	—
Fritz Biegi	SS-Oberscharführer	Zugführer (platoon leader) in the 5./SS-Panzergrenadier-Regiment 9 "Germania"	16 June 1944	Killed in action 15 March 1945	—
Fritz Biermeier	SS-Hauptsturmführer	Leader of the II./SS-Panzer-Regiment 3 "Totenkopf" (Note: According to Scherzer as leader of the II./SS-Panzer-Regiment 3.)	10 December 1943	Awarded 685th Oak Leaves 26 December 1944; Killed in action 11 October 1944	—
Wilhelm Bittrich	SS-Oberführer	Commander of SS-Infanterie-Regiment "Deutschland"	14 December 1941	Awarded 563rd Oak Leaves 28 August 1944 (153rd) Swords 6 May 1945? (Note: The German Federal Archives hold no records for the presentation of the Swords to Wilhelm Bittrich. The award was unlawfully presented by SS-Oberstgruppenführer Sepp Dietrich. The date is taken from the announcement made by the 6. SS-Panzerarmee. The sequential number "153" was assigned by the Association of Knight's Cross Recipients (AKCR). Bittrich was a member of the AKCR.)	
Friedrich Blond? (Note: No evidence of the award can be found in the German Federal Archives. According to Krätschmer the award was presented together with the Oak Leaves to Matthias Kleinheisterkamp. Presumably the announcement was made via radio transmission on 28 April 1945 from the Führer Headquarters in Berlin to the 9. Armee (9th Army) in the Halbe pocket. The radio transmissions received by the AOK 9 (Armeeoberkommando 9 — high command of the 9th army) in April 1945 were not retained. All communication to the Führerbunker in Berlin were out of order as of 5AM on 28 April. The order commission of the Association of Knight's Cross Recipients (AKCR) processed the case in 1981 and decided: "Knight's Cross yes, 28 April 1945", Friedrich Blond was a member of the AKCR.)	SS-Untersturmführer	Leader of the 12./SS-Panzergrenadier Ausbildung und Ersatz Bataillon 1 "Leibstandarte SS Adolf Hitler"	28 April 1945	—	—
Georg Bochmann	SS-Hauptsturmführer	Commander of SS-Panzer-Jäger-Abteilung "Totenkopf" (Note: According to Scherzer as leader of SS "Totenkopf"-Panzer-Jäger-Abteilung.)	3 May 1942	Awarded 246th Oak Leaves 17 May 1943; 140th Swords 26 March 1945	A man wearing a military uniform and neck order in the shape of a cross. His hair is combed back and his facial expression is determined.
Friedrich-Wilhelm Bock	SS-Obersturmführer and Oberstleutnant of the Schupo	Commander of the II./SS-Polizei-Artillerie-Regiment 4	28 March 1943	Awarded 570th Oak Leaves 2 September 1944	—
Joachim Boosfeld	SS-Obersturmführer	Chief of the 4./SS-Kavallerie-Regiment 16 "Florian Geyer" (Note: According to Scherzer as chief of the 4./SS-Kavallerie-Regiment 16.)	21 February 1945	—	—
Hermann Borchers	SS-Hauptsturmführer	Leader of the I./SS-Panzergrenadier-Regiment 19 "Hohenstaufen" (Note: According to Scherzer as leader of the I./SS-Panzergrenadier-Regiment 19.)	16 October 1944	—	—
Karl-Heinz Boska	SS-Obersturmführer	Adjutant of the II./SS-Panzer-Regiment 2 "Das Reich" (Note: According to Scherzer as adjutant of the II./SS-Panzer-Regiment 2.)	16 December 1943	—	—
Gerhard Bremer	SS-Obersturmführer	Leader of the 1.(Kradschützen)/Aufklärungs-Abteilung "Leibstandarte SS Adolf Hitler"	30 October 1941	668th Oak Leaves 26 November 1944	—
Karl-Heinrich Brenner	SS-Gruppenführer and Generalleutnant of the Waffen-SS (Note: According to Scherzer as SS-Gruppenführer and Generalleutnant of the Police.)	Commander of 6. SS-Gebirgs-Division "Nord"	27 December 1944	—	
Karl Brommann	SS-Untersturmführer	Leader of the 1./schwere SS-Panzer-Abteilung 503	29 April 1945	—	—
Siegfried Brosow	SS-Hauptsturmführer	Chief of the 1./SS-Panzer-Pionier-Bataillon "Das Reich" (Note: According to Scherzer as chief of the 1./SS-Panzer-Pionier-Bataillon 2.)	13 November 1943	—	—
Derk-Elsko Bruins	SS-Rottenführer	Geschützführer (gun layer) in the 1./SS-Panzer-Jäger-Abteilung 54 "Nederland" (Note: According to Scherzer as a Geschützführer (gun layer) in the 1./SS-Panzer-Jäger-Abteilung 54.)	23 August 1944	—	—
Hermann Buchner	SS-Hauptsturmführer	Commander of the III./SS-Panzergrenadier-Regiment 5 "Totenkopf" (Note: According to Scherzer as commander of the III./SS-Panzergrenadier-Regiment 5 "Thule".)	16 June 1944	Killed in action 17 November 1944	—
Friedrich Buck	SS-Oberscharführer	Leader of the 5./SS-Kavallerie-Regiment 15 "Florian Geyer" (Note: According to Scherzer as leader of the 5./SS-Kavallerie-Regiment 15.)	27 January 1945	—	—
Franz Budka	SS-Untersturmführer	Leader of the 1./SS-Festungs-Regiment 1 "Besslein" (Note: According to Scherzer as leader of the 1./SS-Festungs-Regiment "Besslein"/Festung Breslau (fortress Breslau).)	19 April 1945	Suicide after severe wounds 6 May 1945	—
Karl-Heinz Bühler? (Note: No evidence of the award to Karl-Heinz Bühler can be found in the German Federal Archives. The award was presumably awarded by SS-Oberstgruppenführer Sepp Dietrich, which would make it an unlawful presentation. The Order Commission of the Association of Knight's Cross Recipients (AKCR) processed this case in 1977 and decided: Knight's Cross no, 1 May 1945. The case Bühler was again processed in the fall of 1983. Whether or not additional or new evidence materialized remains unknown. The Order Commission decided this time: Knight's Cross yes, 8 May 1945. Von Seemen lists him on 7 May 1945, Krätschmer states 1 May 1945. Fellgiebel later re-dated the award on the 6 May 1945. It remains subject to speculation why this was done. Bühler was a member of the AKCR.)	SS-Obersturmbannführer	Commander of SS-Panzergrenadier-Regiment 9 "Germania"	6 May 1945	—	—
Fritz Bunse	SS-Sturmbannführer	Commander of SS-Freiwilligen-Pionier-Bataillon 11 "Nordland" (Note: According to Scherzer as commander of SS-Pionier-Bataillon 11.)	30 January 1944	—	—
Žanis Butkus	Waffen-Hauptsturmführer	Leader of the 10./SS-Feld-Ersatz-Bataillon 19 (Note: According to Scherzer as a company leader in the SS-Feld-Ersatz-Bataillon 19.)	21 September 1944	—	—
Hans-Georg von Charpentier	SS-Hauptsturmführer (Note: According to Scherzer as SS-Hauptsturmführer of the Reserves.)	Chief of the 3./SS-Reiter-Regiment 1	29 October 1942	Killed in action 11 February 1945	A man wearing a military uniform and peaked cap. His cap has an emblem in shape of a human skull and crossed bones.
Fritz Christen	SS-Sturmmann	Richtschütze (gunner) in the 2./SS-Panzer-Jagd-Abteilung 3 "Totenkopf" (Note: According to Scherzer as a Richtschütze (gunner) in the 2./SS-Panzer-Jagd-Abteilung of the SS-"Totenkopf"-Division.)	20 October 1941	—	—
Egon Christophersen	SS-Unterscharführer	Group leader in the 7./SS-Freiwilligen-Panzergrenadier-Regiment 24 "Danmark" (Note: According to Scherzer as a group leader in the 7./SS-Panzergrenadier-Regiment 24 "Danmark".)	11 July 1944	—	—
Hans Collani	SS-Obersturmbannführer	Commander of the SS-Freiwilligen-Panzergrenadier-Regiment 49 "De Ruyter" (niederländische Nr. 2)	19 August 1944*	Killed in action 29 July 1944	—
Hermann Dahlke	SS-Oberscharführer	Company troop leader in the 3./1. SS-Panzergrenadier-Regiment "Leibstandarte SS Adolf Hitler"	3 March 1943	Killed in action 5 July 1943	A man wearing a military uniform, coat with fur collar, peaked cap, neck order in the shape of a cross and a pair of binoculars around his neck. His cap has an emblem in shape of a human skull and crossed bones.
Werner Dallmann	SS-Untersturmführer	Regiment adjutant of SS-Kavallerie-Regiment 53 "Florian Geyer" (Note: According to Scherzer as adjutant in SS-Kavallerie-Regiment 53.)	17 January 1945	Killed in action February 1945	—
Werner Damsch	SS-Hauptsturmführer	Commander of the I./SS-Panzergrenadier-Regiment 25 "Hitlerjugend" (Note: According to Scherzer as commander of the I./SS-Panzergrenadier-Regiment 25.)	17 April 1945	—	—
Fritz Darges	SS-Obersturmbannführer	Leader of SS-Panzer-Regiment 5 "Wiking" (Note: According to Scherzer as leader of SS-Panzer-Regiment 5.)	5 April 1945	—	
Hans Dauser	SS-Oberscharführer	Zugführer (platoon leader) in the 2./SS-Panzer-Regiment 1 "Leibstandarte SS Adolf Hitler"	4 June 1944	—	—
Heinrich Debus	SS-Obersturmführer	Deputy leader of SS-Panzer-Aufklärungs-Abteilung 5 "Wiking" (Note: According to Scherzer as deputy leader of SS-Panzer-Aufklärungs-Abteilung 5.)	4 May 1944	—	—
Günther Degen	SS-Hauptsturmführer	Leader of the I./SS-Gebirgsjäger-Regiment 11 "Reinhard Heydrich"	7 October 1944	Killed in action 15 March 1945	A man wearing a military uniform and peaked cap. His cap has an emblem in shape of a human skull and crossed bones.
Léon Degrelle	SS-Hauptsturmführer (Note: According to Scherzer as SS-Hauptsturmführer of the Reserves and leader of the 5. SS-Freiwilligen-Brigade "Wallonien".)	Leader of SS-Freiwilligen-Brigade "Wallonien"	20 February 1944	(no number) Oak Leaves 27 August 1944	
Ernst Dehmel	SS-Hauptsturmführer	SS-Sturmgeschütz-Abteilung 3	15 August 1943	—	A man in semi profile wearing a military uniform and neck order, in the shape of a cross. His hair is combed to the back.
Dr. jur. Eduard Deisenhofer	SS-Sturmbannführer	3. SS-Panzer-Division	8 May 1942	Killed in action 31 January 1945	—
August Dieckmann	SS-Sturmbannführer	I./SS-Regiment "Germania"	23 April 1942	Awarded 233rd Oak Leaves 16 April 1943; 39th Swords 10 October 1943; Killed in action 10 October 1943	A man wearing a military uniform, peaked cap and a neck order in the shape of a cross.
Josef Diefenthal	SS-Hauptsturmführer	III.(gep.)/SS-Panzergrenadier-Regiment 2 "Leibstandarte SS Adolf Hitler"	5 February 1945	—	—
Hans Diergarten	SS-Sturmbannführer	8. SS-Kavallerie Division "Florian Geyer"	16 January 1944	Killed on active service 21 August 1944	—
Josef Dietrich	SS-Obergruppenführer	SS-Infanterie-Regiment (mot.) "Leibstandarte SS Adolf Hitler"	4 July 1940	Awarded 41st Oak Leaves 31 December 1941; 26th Swords 14 March 1943; 16th Diamonds 6 August 1944	A man in semi profile wearing a military uniform and neck order, in the shape of a cross. He has short, thinning hair and a determined facial expression.
Wilhelm Dietrich	SS-Hauptsturmführer	I./SS-Polizei-Schützen-Regiment	15 October 1944	Killed in action 12 March 1944	—
Bernhard Dietsche	SS-Sturmbannführer	II./SS-Gebirgsjäger-Regiment 2	17 July 1943	—	—
Dr. Oskar Dirlewanger	SS-Oberführer of the Reserves	Commander of SS-Brigade "Dirlewanger" (Note: According to Scherzer as commander of SS-Regiment "Dirlewanger".)	30 September 1944 (Note: According to MacLean, recommended on 30 September 1944 and awarded on 16 October 1944 at Wawel Royal Castle in Krakow.)	—	
Helmut Dörner	SS-Sturmbannführer und Major der Schupo	II./SS-Polizei-Schützen-Regiment 2	15 May 1942	Awarded 650th Oak Leaves 16 November 1944; 129th Swords 1 February 1945; Killed in action 11 February 1945	—
Hans Dorr	SS-Hauptsturmführer	4./SS-Infanterie-Regiment "Germania"	27 September 1942	Awarded 327th Oak Leaves 13 November 1943; 77th Swords 9 July 1944; Died of wounds 17 April 1945	—
Sepp Draxenberger? (Note: No evidence of the award can be found in the German Federal Archives. The award was unlawfully presented by SS-Oberstgruppenführer Sepp Dietrich. The date is taken from the announcement made by the 6. SS-Panzerarmee. Draxenberger was a member of the Association of Knight's Cross Recipients (AKCR).)	SS-Hauptscharführer	Platoon leander in the Stabskompanie/SS-Panzer-Regiment 5 "Wiking"	17 April 1945*	Killed in action 23 March 1945	—
Franz-Josef Dreike? (Note: No evidence of the award can be found in the German Federal Archives. The award was unlawfully presented by SS-Oberstgruppenführer Sepp Dietrich. The date is taken from the announcement made by the 6. SS-Panzerarmee. Franz Josef Dreike was a member of the Association of Knight's Cross Recipients (AKCR).)	SS-Hauptsturmführer of the Reserves	Commander of SS-Flak-Abteilung 2 "Das Reich"	6 May 1945	—	—
Hans Drexel	SS-Obersturmführer	II./SS-Panzergrenadier-Regiment 10	14 October 1943	—	—
Oskar Drexler? (Note: No evidence of the award can be found in the German Federal Archives. Presumably the award was presented by SS-Oberstgruppenführer Sepp Dietrich which would make it an unlawful presentation. The date was assumed by Fellgiebel. Von Seemen states the 23 November 1944. The author was denied access to files, which could help clarify the case, of the Association of Knight's Cross Recipients (AKCR) on the grounds of the Bundesarchivgesetz (German Archive Law). Oskar Drexler was a member of the AKCR.)	SS-Obersturmbannführer	SS-Panzer-Artillerie-Regiment 12	6 May 1945	—	—
Walter Drexler	SS-Sturmbannführer	SS-Aufklärungs-Abteilung 8	11 December 1944	Killed in action 23 February 1945	—
Emil Dürr	SS-Unterscharführer	4.(schw.)/SS-Panzergrenadier-Regiment 26 "Hitlerjugend"	23 August 1944*	Killed in action 27 June 1944	—
Erich Eberhardt	SS-Obersturmbannführer	Ia (operations officer) of the 3. SS-Panzer-Division "Totenkopf"	23 August 1944	—	—
Georg Eberhardt	SS-Sturmbannführer	Commander of estn. SS-Freiwilligen-Panzergrenadier-Bataillon "Narwa" (Note: According to Scherzer as commander of SS-Panzergrenadier-Bataillon "Narwa".)	4 August 1943*	Killed in action 21 July 1943	—
Hans Eckert	SS-Obersturmführer of the Reserves	Leader of the II./SS-Panzergrenadier-Regiment 3 "Deutschland" of the SS-Panzer-Kampfgruppe "Das Reich" (Note: According to Scherzer as leader of the II./SS-Panzergrenadier-Regiment 3 "Deutschland".)	4 May 1944	—	—
Fritz Eckstein	SS-Rottenführer	Richtschütze (gunner) in the 1./SS-Panzer-Jäger-Abteilung 12 "Hitlerjugend" (Note: According to Scherzer as Richtschütze (gunner) in the 1./SS-Panzer-Jäger-Abteilung 12.)	18 November 1944	—	—
Paul Egger? (Note: No evidence of the award can be found in the German Federal Archives. The author was denied access to files, which could help clarify the case, of the Association of Knight's Cross Recipients (AKCR) on the grounds of the Bundesarchivgesetz (German Archive Law). Paul Egger was a member of the AKCR.)	SS-Obersturmführer	Zugführer (platoon leader) in the 1./schwere SS-Panzer-Abteilung 502	28 April 1945	—	—
Fritz Ehrath	SS-Obersturmbannführer	Commander of SS-Panzergrenadier-Regiment 9 "Germania"	23 February 1944	—	—
Hugo Eichhorn	SS-Hauptsturmführer of the Reserves	In the Stab SS-Pionier-Bataillon 5 "Wiking" (Note: According to Scherzer in the Stab Pionier-Bataillon SS-Division "Wiking".)	15 January 1943	—	—
Theodor Eicke	SS-Gruppenführer and Generalleutnant of the Waffen-SS	Commander of SS-Division "Totenkopf"	26 December 1941	Awarded 88th Oak Leaves 20 April 1942; Killed in action 26 February 1943	A man in semi profile wearing a military uniform and neck order, in the shape of a cross. His dark hair is combed to the back. He has determined facial expression.
Hans Endreß	SS-Hauptsturmführer of the Reserves	II./SS-Panzergrenadier-Regiment 6	23 March 1945	—	—
Wilhelm Engelbrecht	SS-Hauptsturmführer	II./SS-Polizei-Schützen-Regiment 19	11 December 1944	—	—
Rudolf Enseling	SS-Sturmbannführer	I./SS-Panzer-Regiment 2	23 August 1944	—	—
Karl-Heinz Ertel	SS-Hauptsturmführer of the Reserves	niederl. SS-Freiwillige-Panzergrenadier-Regiment 49	23 August 1944	—	—
Willi Eßlinger	SS-Hauptscharführer	3./SS-Panzerjäger-Abteilung 5	19 June 1943	Killed in action 25 August 1944	—
Alois Etthöfer	SS-Sturmbannführer	SS-Polizei-Panzer-Abteilung 4	17 March 1945*	Killed in action 20 November 1944	—
Karl-Heinz Euling	SS-Hauptsturmführer	I./SS-Panzergrenadier-Regiment 22	15 October 1944	—	—
Markus Faulhaber	SS-Obersturmführer	3./SS-Panzergrenadier-Regiment 9	25 December 1942	—	—
Hermann Fegelein? (Note: Hermann Fegelein was sentenced to death by Hitler and executed by SS General Johann Rattenhuber's RSD on 28 April 1945 after a court martial led by SS-Brigadeführer and Generalmajor of the Waffen-SS Wilhelm Mohnke. The sentence was carried out the same day. The death sentence resulted in the loss of all orders and honorary signs.)	SS-Standartenführer	SS-Kavallerie-Brigade	2 March 1942	Awarded 157th Oak Leaves 21 December 1942; 83rd Swords 3 July 1944; Executed 29 April 1945	A man in semi profile wearing a military uniform and a neck order in the shape of a cross.
Waldemar Fegelein	SS-Sturmbannführer	SS-Reiter-Regiment 2	16 December 1943	—	—
Henri-Joseph Fénêt	Waffen-Hauptsturmführer	33. SS-Freiwillige-Grenadier-Division "Charlemagne"	29 April 1945	—	—
Willi Fey? (Note: A lawful presentation via the chain of command to the chief of the Heerespersonalamt (HPA—Army Staff Office) Wilhelm Burgdorf in Berlin submitted nomination is possible. Also possible is a direct presentation by Adolf Hitler. However no evidence of the award can be found in the German Federal Archives. The author was denied access to files, which could help clarify the case, of the Association of Knight's Cross Recipients (AKCR) on the grounds of the Bundesarchivgesetz (German Archive Law). Fellgiebel wrote in a letter dated 31 August 1976: "...He (Willhelm Fey) after joining the Bundeswehr has request a court of honor against himself. Chairman was our companion recipient of the Oak Leaves former Oberst XXXX (name was made anonymous). This court of honor has accepted him without evidence". The order commission of the AKCR accepted this. Fellgiebel wrote: "...we don't want to claim that we are smarter than the Bundeswehr." Willhelm Fey was a member of the AKCR.)	SS-Oberscharführer	Führer ein Panzer-Jagd-Kommandos bei der Kampfgruppe Mohnke in Berlin	29 April 1945	—	—
Jakob Fick	SS-Sturmbannführer	I./SS-Kradschützen-Regiment "Langemarck"	23 April 1943	—	—
Johann Fiedler	SS-Unterscharführer	5./SS-Panzergrenadier-Regiment 6	16 June 1944	—	—
Alfred Fischer? (Note: Alfred Fischer's nomination, according to a file card, was received by the Heerespersonalamt (HPA—Army Staff Office) on 11 January 1945. The nomination, according to the book "Verliehene Ritterkreuze" (Awarded Knight Crosses) and note on the file card, had been rejected without specifying a date. A HPA nomination was not created. Fischer received the Honour Roll Clasp of the Army on 5 March 1945 which may have result of the rejected Knight's Cross nomination. The nomination by the troop is missing, which may be an indication that it had been forwarded to the Referat Vg (responsible for the Honour Roll Clasp listings). The presentation date is an assumption of the Association of Knight's Cross Recipients (AKCR). Krätschmer states the 9 May 1945.)	SS-Sturmbannführer	II./SS-Panzer-Artillerie-Regiment 11	11 May 1945	—	—
Gerhard Fischer	SS-Unterscharführer	3./SS-Panzerjäger-Abteilung 5	4 May 1944	—	—
Hans Flügel	SS-Hauptsturmführer of the Reserves	II./SS-Panzer-Regiment 5	16 October 1944	—	—
Robert Frank	SS-Sturmbannführer	II./SS-Panzergrenadier-Regiment 20	4 June 1944*	Killed in action 4 June 1944	—
Kurt Franke	SS-Hauptscharführer	3./SS-Panzergrenadier-Regiment 6	3 October 1943	Killed in action 19 January 1945	—
Egon Franz	SS-Unterscharführer	3./SS-Panzergrenadier-Regiment 9	16 October 1944	—	—
Franz Frauscher	SS-Hauptscharführer	4./SS-Panzer-Regiment 2	31 December 1944	—	—
Andrejs Freimanis	Waffen-Obersturmführer	13./Waffen-Grenadier-Regiment der SS 44 (lett. Nr. 6)	5 May 1945	—	—
Fritz Freitag	SS-Brigadeführer	14. Waffen-Grenadier-Division der SS	30 September 1944	—	A man wearing a military uniform and various military decorations.
Albert Frey	SS-Sturmbannführer	I./SS-Panzergrenadier-Regiment "Leibstandarte SS Adolf Hitler"	3 March 1943	Awarded 359th Oak Leaves 27 December 1943	—
Kurt Fröhlich? (Note: No evidence of the award can be found in the German Federal Archives. Presumably the award was presented by SS-Oberstgruppenführer Sepp Dietrich which would make it an unlawful presentation. The date 6 May 1945 was assumed by Fellgiebel. Von Seemen states the 3 May 1945. Kurt Fröhlich is not mentioned in Krätschmer's book. The author was denied access to files, which could help clarify the case, of the Association of Knight's Cross Recipients (AKCR) on the grounds of the Bundesarchivgesetz (German Archive Law).)	SS-Hauptsturmführer	II./SS-Panzer-Regiment 9	6 May 1945	—	—
Carl-Heinz Frühauf	SS-Hauptsturmführer	II./niederl. SS-Freiwillige-Panzergrenadier-Regiment 49	4 June 1944	—	—
Robert Gaigals? (Note: Roberts Gaigals' nomination had been finalized by the Heerespersonalamt (HPA—Army Staff Office) and was ready for signature by the end of the war. According to the Association of Knight's Cross Recipients (AKCR) the award was presented in accordance with the Dönitz-decree. This is illegal according to the Deutsche Dienststelle (WASt) and lacks legal justification. The presentation date is an assumption of the AKCR.)	Waffen-Obersturmführer	Leader of the 6./Waffen-Grenadier-Regiment 42 of the SS "Voldemars Veiss"	5 May 1945	—	—
Nikolajs Galdiņš	Waffen-Obersturmbannführer	Commander of Waffen-Grenadier-Regiment der SS Nr. 42 "Voldemars Veiss" (Note: According to Scherzer as commander of Waffen-Grenadier-Regiment der SS 42 (lett. Nr. 1).)	25 January 1945	—	—
Wolfgang Gast	SS-Obersturmführer	Leader of the I./SS-Panzer-Artillerie-Regiment 2 "Das Reich" (Note: According to Scherzer as leader of the I./SS-Panzer-Artillerie-Regiment 2.)	4 June 1944	—	—
Gebhard? (Note: No evidence regarding the presentation of the Knight's Cross of the Iron Cross to Karl Gebhard can be found in the German Federal Archive. Fellgiebel also had no evidence and wrote on 11 July 1983 to Mr. Eichhorn: "I have to rely on Krätschmer in Rieflin Fritz's case, as well as in Gebhard's.". Krätschmer may have his information from Hermann Buch, the former IIa (personnel administration) of the 2. SS-Division "Das Reich", who mentioned the name Gebhard in a letter to von Seeman on 6 December 1970. Unlawful presentation by SS-Oberstgruppenführer Sepp Dietrich. The date is taken from the announcement made by the 6. SS-Panzerarmee.)	SS-Oberscharführer	Zugführer (platoon leader) in the 2./SS-Panzer-Pionier-Bataillon 2 "Das Reich"	6 May 1945	—	—
Walter Gerth	SS-Obersturmführer of the Reserves	Chief of the 7./SS-Panzer-Artillerie-Regiment 3 "Totenkopf" (Note: According to Scherzer as chief of the 7./SS-"Totenkopf"-Artillerie-Regiment.)	31 March 1943	—	
Karl Gesele	SS-Obersturmbannführer	Commander of SS-Sturmbrigde "Reichsführer SS" (sp. 16. SS-Panzergrenadier-Division) (Note: According to Scherzer as commander of SS-Sturmbrigde "Reichsführer SS".)	4 July 1944	—	—
Otto Gieseke	SS-Standartenführer and Oberst of the Schupo	Commander of SS-Polizei-Schützen-Regiment 1	30 September 1942	—	—
Karl-Heinz Gieseler? (Note: Karl-Heinz Gieseler is listed as a recipient in Fellgiebel as SS-Untersturmführer and Stoßtruppführer in Berlin as a member of the 11. SS-Panzergrenadier-Division "Nordland". Fellgiebel himself states that the presentation was made by SS-Brigadeführer Wilhelm Mohnke in the bunker of the Reichs Chancellery between 25 – 30 April 1945. The number of likely presentations varies between 3 and 5 soldiers. No evidence of the award can be found in the German Federal Archives. Gieseler is not listed by Scherzer.)	SS-Untersturmführer	Stoßtruppführer (shock troops leader) in Berlin (in the 11. SS-Panzergrenadier-Division "Nordland")	29 April 1945	—	—
Herbert Otto Gille	SS-Oberführer	Commander of SS-Artillerie-Regiment 5 "Wiking" (Note: According to Scherzer as commander of Artillerie-Regiment SS-Division "Wiking".)	8 October 1942	Awarded 315th Oak Leaves 1 November 1943; 47th Swords 20 February 1944; 12th Diamonds 19 April 1944	A man fat a desk, wearing a military uniform and neck order, in the shape of a cross.
Léon Gillis	SS-Untersturmführer	5. SS-Freiwillige-Sturmbrigade "Wallonie"	30 September 1944	—	—
Walter Girg	SS-Untersturmführer	1./502nd SS Jäger Battalion	4 October 1944	Awarded 814th Oak Leaves 1 April 1945	—
Johannes Göhler	SS-Obersturmführer	4./SS-Reiter-Regiment 15	17 September 1943	—	—
Erich Göstl	SS-Panzergrenadier	SS-Panzergrenadier-Regiment 1	31 October 1944	—	—
Herbert Golz? (Note: No evidence of the award can be found in the German Federal Archives. According to Krätschmer the action took place in March 1945 in Pomerania with the Army Group Vistula. Von Seemen lists Herbert Golz with the footnote: "Source: Generalmajor (Pol.) Rode, at the time chief of staff with the chief of the German Police". This posting is not verifiable. A SS-Brigadeführer and Generalmajor Rode is verifiable and was chief of staff of the field commando of the Reichsführer SS. This field commando processed at the time the nominations of the Waffen-SS and prepared them for approval by Heinrich Himmler. These nominations at the time were received by SS-Obersturmbannführer Kment, the adjutant of Himmler and liaison officer to the Heerespersonalamt (HPA—Army Staff Office). Golz nomination could have been a unlawful presentation by Himmler as commander in chief of the Army Group Vistula. The order commission of the Association of Knight's Cross Recipients (AKCR) handled this case in 1977 and decided: "Knight's Cross yes, 31 March 1945". The evidence sustaining this decision remains unclear. Access to the files was denied on the grounds of the Bundesarchivgesetz (German Archive Law). The presentation date was later changed by Fellgiebel. Golz was a member of the AKCR.)	SS-Standartenführer und Oberst der Schupo	Generalstab X. SS-Armeekorps	3 May 1945	—	—
Curt von Gottberg	SS-Gruppenführer	Führer der Kampfgruppe "von Gottberg"	30 June 1944	—	—
Heinrich Gottke	SS-Unterscharführer	3./SS-Flak-Abteilung 17	27 December 1944	—	—
Rainer Gottsein	SS-Obersturmbannführer	Kommandeur Sipo und SD Budapest und Führer einer Kampfgruppe	6 February 1945	Killed in action 13 February 1945	—
Viktor-Eberhard Gräbner	SS-Hauptsturmführer of the Reserves	SS-Panzer-Aufklärungs-Abteilung 9	23 August 1944	Killed in action 18 September 1944	—
Erich Grätz	SS-Hauptsturmführer	18.(Panzerjäger)/SS-Panzergrenadier-Regiment 1	14 May 1944	—	—
Simon Grascher	SS-Unterscharführer	9./SS-Panzergrenadier-Regiment 4	14 August 1943*	Killed in action 1 August 1943	—
Gerhard Grebarsche	SS-Hauptscharführer	3./SS-Panzergrenadier-Regiment 2	24 January 1944	—	—
Horst Gresiak	SS-Obersturmführer	7./SS-Panzer-Regiment 2	25 January 1945	—	—
Willy Grieme	SS-Obersturmführer of the Reserves	6./SS-Panzergrenadier-Regiment 4	17 September 1943	—	—
Bernhard Griese	SS-Sturmbannführer	SS-Polizei-Schützen-Bataillon 323	3 May 1942	—	—
Franz Grohmann	SS-Obersturmführer	1./SS-Panzergrenadier-Regiment 3 "Deutschland"	23 August 1944	—	—
Heinz Gropp? (Note: No evidence of the award can be found in the German Federal Archives. According to Fellgiebel the award was presented by SS-Oberstgruppenführer Sepp Dietrich, which would make it an unlawful presentation. Fellgiebel's sources are Hermann Buch and Wilhelm Kment. According to Buch—note from 25 June 2005—he has nothing to do with this presentation. And Kment cannot be the source, since Buch stated that Kment died in the early 1970s (Wilhelm Kment actually died on 15 November 1984). If Kment were the source then von Seemen would have listed Heinz Gropp in either the first or second edition of his book, which is not the case. The source thus remains uncertain. Krätschmer lists Gropp in his third edition with a date of 1 May 1945 without stating a source as well. Fellgiebel dated the award on 6 May 1945. He may have done this to justify this as a Dietrich award.)	SS-Obersturmführer of the Reserves	2./SS-Flak-Abteilung 9	6 May 1945	—	—
Martin Groß	SS-Sturmbannführer	II./SS-Panzer-Regiment 1	22 July 1943	—	—
Alfred Großrock	SS-Untersturmführer	6./SS-Panzer-Regiment 5	12 August 1944	Died of wounds 4 April 1945	—
Rudolf Grünner	SS-Unterscharführer	Regiment "Mohr" in der Festung Breslau	10 March 1945	—	—
Alfred Günther	SS-Oberscharführer	1./SS-Sturmgeschütz-Abteilung 1	3 March 1943	Killed in action 15 June 1944	A man wearing a military uniform, peaked cap and a neck order in the shape of a cross. His cap has an emblem in shape of a human skull and crossed bones.
Martin Gürz	SS-Hauptsturmführer	III./SS-Freiwillige-Panzergrenadier-Regiment 23 "Norge"	23 October 1944*	Killed in action 26 September 1944	—
Paul Guhl	SS-Hauptsturmführer	III.(gep.)/SS-Panzergrenadier-Regiment 2	4 June 1944	—	—
Franz Hack	SS-Sturmbannführer	Commander of the III.(gepanzert)/SS-Panzergrenadier-Regiment 9 "Germania"	14 May 1943	Awarded (844th) Oak Leaves 18 April 1945? (Note: The recommendation for Franz Hack's Oak Leaves to the Knight's Cross was submitted to the Heerespersonalamt by the Division sometime between 16 and 19 April 1945 and approved by the commander of the IV. SS-Korps Herbert Otto Gille. Missing is the approval from the 6. Armee and Heeresgruppe Süd. There is no indication whether the recommendation was approved. The response from the Reichsführer-SS was prepared but missing is a date and signature. The existing card is not contemporary. There is no indication in the press that the award was presented. According to Fellgiebel Hack received the Oak Leaves from SS-Obergruppenführer and General of the SS Herbert-Otto Gille, commanding general IV. SS-Panzerkorps. The sequential number "844" and date of award were assigned by the Association of Knight's Cross Recipients (AKCR).)	—
Heinz Hämel	SS-Hauptsturmführer	II./SS-Freiwillige-Panzergrenadier-Regiment 24	16 June 1944	—	—
Ernst Häußler	SS-Sturmbannführer	II./SS-Panzergrenadier-Regiment 5	15 August 1943	—	A man wearing a camouflage military uniform, side cap and neck order in the shape of a cross. His cap has an emblem in shape of a human skull and crossed bones.
Heinrich Halbeck	SS-Untersturmführer	V. SS-Gebirgskorps	17 April 1945	—	—
Desiderius Hampel? (Note: No evidence of the award can be found in the German Federal Archives. Presumably Desiderius Hampel received the Knight's Cross the same day as Karl Liecke and Hans Hanke. Letter from Krätschmer to von Seemen dated 7 August 1980. According to von Semen presumably presented by General Maximilian de Angelis. The Order Commission of the Association of Knight's Cross Recipients (AKCR) processed Hampel's case in 1980 and Fellgiebel decided: Knight's Cross yes, 3 May 1945. In his book he noted: "A justification for the presentation was not given". Hampel was a member of the AKCR.)	SS-Brigadeführer	13. Waffen-Gebirgs-Division der SS "Handschar" (kroat. Nr. 1)	3 May 1945	—	—
Hans Hanke? (Note: No evidence of the award can be found in the German Federal Archives. Hans Hanke, according to Krätschmer, was informed of the award by SS-Brigadeführer Desiderius Hampel and SS-Obersturmbannführer Karl Liecke. Both Hampel and Liecke supposedly received the Knight's Cross the same day—Letter from Krätschmer to von Seemen dated 7 August 1980. Mr Meentz of the German Federal Archive stated on 20 July 2004 that it cannot be verified that Hanke received the Knight's Cross. According to von Seemen the Knight's Cross was awarded by General Maximilian de Angelis. The order commission of the Association of Knight's Cross Recipients (AKCR) processed the case in 1980 and Fellgiebel decided: "Knight's Cross yes, 3 May 1945". Nevertheless Fellgiebel noted: No justification for the award.)	SS-Obersturmbannführer	Waffen-Gebirgsjäger-Regiment der SS 28 (kroat. Nr. 2)	3 May 1945	—	—
Heinrich Hannibal	SS-Standartenführer	SS-Polizei-Schützen-Regiment 31	23 August 1944	—	—
Max Hansen	SS-Sturmbannführer	II./SS-Panzergrenadier-Regiment 1	28 March 1943	Awarded 835th Oak Leaves 17 April 1945	A man wearing a military uniform, peaked cap and a neck order in the shape of a cross. His cap has an emblem in shape of a human skull and crossed bones.
Heinz Harmel	SS-Obersturmbannführer	SS-Panzergrenadier-Regiment 3	31 March 1943	Awarded 296th Oak Leaves 7 September 1943; 116th Swords 15 December 1944	A man wearing a military uniform, peaked cap and a neck order in the shape of a cross. His cap has an emblem in shape of a human skull and crossed bones.
Kurt Hartrampf? (Note: No evidence of the award can be found in the German Federal Archives. According to Krätschmer—letter dated on 7 August 1980 to von Seemen— the presentation was made in conjunction to the Oak Leaves presentation to Matthias Kleinheisterkamp and was announced via radio transmission on 28 April 1945 from the Führer Headquarters in Berlin to the 9. Armee (9th Army) in the Halbe pocket. The radio transmissions received by the AOK 9 (Armeeoberkommando 9 — high command of the 9th army) in April 1945 were not retained. All communication to the Führerbunker in Berlin were out of order as of 5AM on 28 April. The order commission of the Association of Knight's Cross Recipients (AKCR) processed Kurt Hartrampf's case in 1980 and decided solely relying on the letter from Krätschmer: "Knight's Cross yes, 28 April 1945", Hartrampf was a member of the AKCR.)	SS-Sturmbannführer	schwere SS-Panzer-Abteilung 502	28 April 1945	—	—
Walter Harzer	SS-Obersturmbannführer	9. SS-Panzer-Division "Hohenstaufen"	21 September 1944	—	—
Frank Hasse	SS-Obersturmführer	11./SS-Panzergrenadier-Regiment 1	6 August 1944	Killed in action 24 December 1944	—
Edgar Hauckelt? (Note: No evidence of the award can be found in the German Federal Archives. According to Krätschmer—letter dated on 7 August 1980 to von Seemen— the presentation was made in conjunction to the Oak Leaves presentation to Matthias Kleinheisterkamp and was announced via radio transmission on 28 April 1945 from the Führer Headquarters in Berlin to the 9. Armee (9th Army) in the Halbe pocket. The radio transmissions received by the AOK 9 (Armeeoberkommando 9 — high command of the 9th army) in April 1945 were not retained. All communication to the Führerbunker in Berlin were out of order as of 5AM on 28 April. The order commission of the Association of Knight's Cross Recipients (AKCR) processed Edgar Hauckelt's case in 1980 and decided solely relying on the letter from Krätschmer: "Knight's Cross yes, 28 April 1945".)	SS-Obersturmführer	1./SS-Jagdpanzer-Abteilung 561	28 April 1945	—	—
Hans Hauser? (Note: No evidence of the award can be found in the German Federal Archives. The award was unlawfully presented by SS-Oberstgruppenführer Sepp Dietrich. The date is taken from the announcement made by the 6. SS-Panzerarmee. Hauser was a member of the Association of Knight's Cross Recipients (AKCR).)	SS-Sturmbannführer und Major der Schupo	I./SS-Panzergrenadier-Regiment 4 "Der Führer"	6 May 1945	—	—
Paul Hausser	SS-Gruppenführer	2. SS-Division "Das Reich"	8 August 1941	Awarded 261st Oak Leaves 28 July 1943; 90th Swords 26 August 1944	A man in semi profile wearing a military uniform, peaked cap and a neck order in the shape of a cross. His cap has an emblem in shape of a human skull and crossed bones.
Hans Havik? (Note: The nomination by the troop was received by the Heerespersonalamt (HPA—Army Staff Office) via teleprinter on 6 April 1945. This can be verified in the book "Verliehene Ritterkreuze" (Awarded Knight Crosses) and file card. A HPA nomination was never created or was not retained and according to the file card the nomination was numbered Nr. 5023 and forwarded for further processing. The file card indicates no further information. The presentation date according to Krätschmer was the 6 May 1945. Mr Meentz of the German Federal Archive stated on 20 July 2004 that it cannot be verified that Hans Havik (Johann Havik according to Scherzer) received the Knight's Cross. The presentation date 9 May 1945 was assigned by Fellgiebel.)	SS-Untersturmführer	1./SS-Polizei-Panzer-Abteilung 4	6 May 1945	—	—
Eberhard Heder	SS-Hauptsturmführer	SS-Panzer-Pionier-Bataillon 5	18 November 1944	—	—
Nicolaus Heilmann	SS-Oberführer	15. Waffen-Grenadier-Division der SS	23 August 1944	Killed in action 30 January 1945	—
Heinrich Heimann	SS-Hauptsturmführer	SS-Sturmgeschütz-Abteilung 1	23 February 1944	Killed in action 20 August 1944	—
Willy Hein	SS-Obersturmführer	2./SS-Panzer-Regiment 5	4 May 1944	—	—
Albert Hektor	SS-Oberscharführer	7./SS-Freiwillige-Panzergrenadier-Regiment 24 "Danmark"	23 August 1944	Killed in action 9 April 1945	—
Johannes Hellmers	SS-Obersturmführer of the Reserves	6./SS-Freiwillige-Panzergrenadier-Regiment 49	5 March 1945	—	—
Fritz Henke	SS-Oberscharführer	3./SS-Sturmgeschütz-Abteilung 1	12 February 1944	—	—
Friedrich Herzig	SS-Sturmbannführer	schwere SS-Panzer-Abteilung 503	29 April 1945	—	—
Konrad Heubeck	SS-Untersturmführer	1./SS-Panzer-Regimentt 1	17 April 1945	—	A man in semi profile wearing a military uniform and various military decorations. His hair is combed back and his facial expression is determined.
Bruno Hinz	SS-Untersturmführer	2./SS-Panzergrenadier-Regiment 10	2 December 1943	Awarded 559th Oak Leaves 23 August 1944	—
Hans Hirning	SS-Rottenführer	6./SS-Totenkopf-Infanterie-Regiment 1	23 October 1942	Killed in action 30 April 1945	—
Werner Hörnicke	SS-Sturmbannführer of the Reserves	I./SS-Grenadier-Regiment 10 (mot.)	1 December 1943	—	—
Lothar Hofer	SS-Sturmbannführer	III./SS-Artillerie-Regiment 54	5 April 1945	—	—
Ludwig Hoffmann? (Note: Mr Meentz of the German Federal Archive stated on 20 July 2004 that it cannot be verified that Ludwig Hoffmann received the Knight's Cross. The presentation date was assigned by Fellgiebel. Krätschmer lists him on 9 May 1945. Hoffmann was a member of the Association of Knight's Cross Recipients (AKCR))	SS-Hauptsturmführer	III./SS-Panzergrenadier-Regiment 23 "Norge"	9 May 1945	—	—
Josef Holte	SS-Oberscharführer	2./SS-Panzer-Regiment 9	27 August 1944*	Killed in action 20 August 1944	—
Friedrich Holzer	SS-Hauptsturmführer	1./SS-Panzer-Regiment 2	10 December 1943	—	—
Willi Hund	SS-Obersturmführer	7./SS-Freiwillige-Panzergrenadier-Regiment 23 "Norge"	11 May 1945 (Note: According to Scherzer on 20 April 1945)	—	—
Georg Hurdelbrink	SS-Obersturmführer	1./SS-Panzerjäger-Abteilung 12	16 October 1944	—	—
Friedrich Jeckeln	SS-Obergruppenführer and General of the Polizei and Waffen-SS (Note: According to Scherzer as SS-Obergruppenführer and General of the Waffen-SS, Höherer SS- and Polizei and leader of the Höhere SS- und Polizeiführer Northern Russia, leader of Kampfgruppe Jeckeln (lett. Polizei) in the 18. Armee.)	Höherer SS- und Polizeiführer Ostland und Rußland-Nord and leader of a lett. SS-Polizei-Kampfgruppe	27 August 1944	Awarded 802nd Oak Leaves 8 March 1945	
Walter Jentschke	SS-Kanonier	Radio troop leader in the 5./SS-Freiwilligen-Artillerie-Regiment 54 "Nederland"	18 December 1944	—	—
Wolfgang Joerchel	SS-Obersturmbannführer	Commander of niederländ. SS-Freiwilligen-Panzergrenadier-Regiment 48 "General Seyffardt" (Note: According to Scherzer as commander of SS-Freiwilligen-Panzergrenadier-Regiment 48 "General Seyffardt" (niederländische Nr. 1).)	21 April 1944	Killed in action May 1945	—
Hans Juchem	SS-Hauptsturmführer	Commander of the II./Panzergrenadier-Regiment "Germania"	12 September 1943*	Killed in action 13 August 1943	—
Heinz Jürgens? (Note: Heinz Jürgens' nomination by the troop was received by the Heerespersonalamt (HPA—Army Staff Office) sometime between 23 and 27 April 1945 and prepared for signature with a presentation date of 28 April 1945. However it was never signed. According to the Association of Knight's Cross Recipients (AKCR) the award was presented in accordance with the Dönitz-decree. This is illegal according to the Deutsche Dienststelle (WASt) and lacks legal justification. Jürgens was a member of the AKCR.)	SS-Hauptsturmführer	Commander of SS-Panzer-Aufklärungs-Abteilung 4	9 May 1945	—	—
Arnold Jürgensen	SS-Sturmbannführer	Commander of the I./SS-Panzer-Regiment 12 "Hitlerjugend"	16 October 1944	Died of wounds 23 December 1944	—
Helmut Kämpfe	SS-Sturmbannführer	III. (Gep.)/SS-Panzergrenadier-Regiment 4	10 December 1943	Executed 10 June 1944	
Vinzenz Kaiser	SS-Hauptsturmführer	III. (Gep)/SS-Panzergrenadier-Regiment 4	6 April 1943	Killed in action 20 April 1945	—
Alois Kalss	SS-Obersturmführer	1./schwere SS-Panzer-Abteilung 502	23 August 1944	Killed in action 2 May 1945	—
Søren Kam	SS-Untersturmführer	1./SS-Panzergrenadier-Regiment 9	7 February 1945	—	
Georg Karck	SS-Obersturmführer	9./SS-Panzergrenadier-Regiment 2	3 August 1943	Killed on active service 3 July 1944	—
Friedrich-Wilhelm Karl	SS-Obersturmbannführer	SS-Freiwillige-Panzer-Artillerie-Regiment 11	26 December 1944	—	—
Paul-Albert Kausch	SS-Obersturmbannführer	Commander of SS-Panzer-Abteilung 11 "Hermann von Salza"	23 August 1944	Awarded (845th) Oak Leaves 23 April 1945? (Note: No evidence of the award can be found in the German Federal Archives. Walther-Peer Fellgiebel claimed that Paul-Albert Kausch, at the time wounded in the Reich Chancellery, had received news that according to a radio message received from Panzer AOK 11 had been awarded the Oak Leaves on 23 April 1945 from SS-Brigadeführer Joachim Ziegler. Ziegler, the Division commander of Kausch, was killed in action on 1 May 1945. Ernst-Günther Krätschmer however indicated that Kausch was wounded 25 April, therefore he couldn’t have received the news on 25 April. The 11th SS Volunteer Panzergrenadier Division Nordland was only subordinated to the 11th Panzer Armee in February 1945. The Stab of the 11th Panzer Army then relocated to the Western Front where it surrendered on 21 April. Krätschmer claimed that the award was presented for the actions during the middle of April east of Berlin. Mr. J.S. Fischer, who was verifying the Oak Leaves presentation on behalf of Fellgiebel is not aware of a radio message received from the Panzer AOK 11. Fischer indicated that he only referenced the information presented by Kausch, which is already stated in Krätschmer. According to information by Fischer on 14 October 2004, Fellgiebel had made the note about the Panzer AOK 11. The sequential number "845" was assigned by the Association of Knight's Cross Recipients (AKCR), according to Krätschmer the number is "846", the date was accepted by the AKCR. Kausch was member of the AKCR.)	—
Karl Keck	SS-Hauptsturmführer	15. (Pi)/SS-Panzergrenadier-Regiment 21	23 August 1944*	Killed in action 11 July 1944	—
Georg Keppler	SS-Oberführer	SS-Infanterie-Regiment "Der Führer"	15 August 1940	—	
Ludwig Kepplinger	SS-Hauptscharführer	11./SS-Infanterie-Regiment "Der Führer"	4 September 1940	Killed in action 6 August 1944	—
Dieter Kesten	SS-Hauptsturmführer	6./SS-Panzer-Regiment 2	12 November 1943	Killed in action 3 April 1945	—
Hans Kettgen	SS-Hauptsturmführer	I./SS-Panzergrenadier-Regiment "Schill"	14 February 1945	—	—
Helmut Kinz? (Note: No evidence of the award can be found in the German Federal Archives. Also never processed by the Order Commission of the Association of Knight's Cross Recipients (AKCR). According to von Semen presumably presented by General Maximilian de Angelis on the basis of the Dönitz-decree. Fellgiebel noted in his book: "A justification for the presentation was not given".)	SS-Hauptsturmführer und Hauptmann der Schupo	Waffen- Gebirgs-Aufklärungs-Abteilung 13	3 May 1945	—	—
Otto Kirchner	SS-Untersturmführer	SS-Reiter-Regiment 16	21 April 1944	Executed 3 May 1945	—
Franz Kleffner	SS-Sturmbannführer	SS-Kradschützen-Bataillon "Totenkopf"	19 February 1942	Killed in action 16 March 1945	—
Matthias Kleinheisterkamp	SS-Brigadeführer and Generalmajor of the Waffen-SS	Commander of SS-Division "Das Reich"	31 March 1942	Awarded (871st) Oak Leaves 9 May 1945? (Note: Scherzer expressed doubt about the veracity of the presentation of the Oak Leaves to Matthias Kleinheisterkamp. According to Scherzer, Fellgiebel claims that the nomination was received by the Heerespersonalamt (HPA—Army Staff Office) via teleprinter from the commander-in-chief of the 9. Armee, General Theodor Busse, on 21 April 1945. Busse had nominated SS-Obergruppenführer Kleinheisterkamp for the Oak Leaves. The claim is that the teleprinter message contained a note that the formal procedure for immediate approval should be waited for (Dienstwegvorschlag bzgl. Sofortverleihung abwarten). This teleprinter message cannot be found in the German Nation Archives (Bestand RH 7). Busse had also nominated by teleprinter message Generalmajor Joachim von Siegroth on the 21 April. This teleprinter message can be found in the Nation Archives (Bundesarchiv RH 7/300). According to Fellgiebel the same note can be found on von Siegroth's nomination. This means that a formal nomination, in this instance via the Army Group Vistula, followed. Both announced "formal nominations" never followed and were never received by the HPA. The teleprinter message nomination of von Siegroth is listed in the book of "Verliehene Ritterkreuze" (Awarded Knight Crosses) with an entry date of 21 April but Kleinheisterkamp's nomination isn't. The reason for this may be that the liaison officer of the Waffen-SS at the HPA/P5a may have forwarded the nomination to the Reichsführer-SS for approval. From here it should have been returned to the HPA, which it wasn't. The distribution list of von Siegroth's nomination indicates that general Busse had informed the Army Group Vistula and the chief of the HPA general Wilhelm Burgdorf. It is very likely that Kleinheisterkamp's nomination had the same distribution list as von Siegroth's, because the same principles applied. Burgdorf therefore should have been informed of the formal procedure regarding Kleinheisterkamp's nomination. The question remains unanswered whether the Führer Headquarter or Adolf Hitler has approved the direct nomination of Kleinheisterkamp on 28 April or not. Scherzer claims that this is very unlikely because Burgdorf would not have done two things. First, submit a nomination to the Führer without having assessed the situation himself, which only would have been possible if he had studied the formal paperwork. Secondly he would not have bypassed the formal procedure which was already initiated. Additionally the radio connection to the Führerbunker was down since 5:00 on 28 April 1945. The sequential number "871" was assigned by the Association of Knight's Cross Recipients (AKCR) and the date is assumed.); Killed in action 29 April 1945 (Note: According to Fellgiebel on 2 May 1945 in the Battle of Halbe.)	
Albert Klett	SS-Obersturmführer of the Reserves	6./SS-Kavallerie-Regiment 15	16 October 1944	Killed in action 14 March 1945	A man wearing a military uniform and neck order in the shape of a cross. His black hair is parted and his facial expression is determined.
Heinrich Kling	SS-Hauptsturmführer	13. (schw.)/SS-Panzer-Regiment 1	23 February 1944	—	—
Fritz Klingenberg	SS-Hauptsturmführer	2./Kradschützen-Bataillon 2	14 May 1941	Killed in action 25 March 1945	A smiling man wearing a military uniform, peaked cap and a neck order in the shape of a cross. His cap has an emblem in shape of a human skull and crossed bones.
Karl Kloskowski	SS-Hauptscharführer	4./SS-Panzer-Regiment 2	11 July 1943	Awarded 546th Oak Leaves 11 August 1944; Missing in action 23 April 1945	A man wearing a camouflage military uniform, side cap and a pair of binoculars around his neck. His cap has an emblem in shape of a human skull and crossed bones.
Walter Kniep	SS-Sturmbannführer	SS-Sturmgeschütz-Abteilung 2	14 August 1943	Killed on active service 22 April 1944	—
Gustav Knittel	SS-Sturmbannführer	SS-Panzer-Aufklärungs-Abteilung 1	4 June 1944	—	—
Fritz Knöchlein	SS-Obersturmbannführer	SS-Freiwillige-Panzergrenadier-Regiment 23	16 November 1944	—	
Alfred Koch? (Note: No evidence of the award can be found in the German Federal Archives. The award was unlawfully presented by SS-Oberstgruppenführer Sepp Dietrich. The date is taken from the announcement made by the 6. SS-Panzerarmee.)	SS-Obersturmführer	II./SS-Panzergrenadier-Regiment 3	6 May 1945	—	—
Ludwig Köchle	SS-Oberscharführer	5./SS-Totenkopf-Infanterie-Regiment 1	28 February 1942	Killed in action 9 June 1942	—
Karl Körner	SS-Hauptscharführer	2./schwere SS-Panzer-Abteilung 503	29 April 1945	—	—
Walter Körner? (Note: Walter Körner's nomination by the troop was received by the Heerespersonalamt (HPA—Army Staff Office) end of March 1945. There is no entry date listed on the file card nor in the book "Verliehene Ritterkreuze" (Awarded Knight Crosses). The HPA created a nomination request with the number 4980, which does not exist anymore, and according to the file card was submitted for further processing on 4 April 1945. No further comments or notes indicate that the nomination was finalized. Mr Meentz of the German Federal Archive stated on 20 July 2004 that it cannot be verified that Körner received the Knight's Cross. Fellgiebel assigned the presentation date. Krätschmer claims that the award was approved on 9 May 1945.)	SS-Hauptsturmführer	SS-Freiwillige-Panzergrenadier-Regiment 23 "Norge"	11 May 1945*	Died of wounds 6 March 1945	—
Siegfried Korth	SS-Obersturmführer	3./SS-Kavallerie-Regiment 18	9 February 1945	—	—
Boris Kraas	SS-Sturmbannführer	SS-Panzerjäger-Abteilung 3	28 February 1945*	Died of wounds 13 February 1945	—
Hugo Kraas	SS-Sturmbannführer	I./SS-Panzergrenadier-Regiment 2	28 March 1943	Awarded 375th Oak Leaves 24 January 1944	—
Ernst-August Krag	SS-Sturmbannführer	SS-Panzer-Aufklärungs-Abteilung 2	23 October 1944	Awarded 755th Oak Leaves 28 February 1945	—
Bernhard Krause	SS-Sturmbannführer	I./SS-Panzergrenadier-Regiment 26	18 November 1944	Killed in action 19 February 1945	—
Oswald Krauss	SS-Sturmbannführer	SS-Kavalerie-Regiment 15	27 January 1945	Killed in action 9 March 1945	—
Karl Kreutz	SS-Standartenführer	SS-Panzer-Artillerie-Regiment 2	27 August 1944	Awarded 863rd Oak Leaves 6 May 1945	—
Franz-Josef Krombholz	SS-Hauptsturmführer	III./SS-Freiwillige-Gebirgsjäger-Regiment 14	28 March 1945	—	—
Otto Kron	SS-Hauptsturmführer	SS-Flak-Abteilung 3	28 June 1942	—	—
Albrecht Krügel	SS-Sturmbannführer	II./SS-Freiwillige-Panzergrenadier-Regiment 23	12 March 1944	Awarded 651st Oak Leaves 16 November 1944; Killed in action 16 March 1945	—
Friedrich-Wilhelm Krüger	SS-Obergruppenführer	6. SS-Gebirgs-Division "Nord"	22 October 1944	Suicide 9 May 1945	
Joachim Krüger	SS-Untersturmführer	10./SS-Panzergrenadier-Regiment 4	24 June 1944*	Died of wounds 14 August 1943	—
Walter Krüger	SS-Brigadeführer	SS-Polizei-Division	13 December 1941	Awarded 286th Oak Leaves 31 August 1943; 120th Swords 11 January 1945; Suicide 22 May 1945 (Note: Walter Krüger's date of death is inconclusive. According to Florian Berger date of death is 20 May 1945, Walther-Per Fellgiebel states 8 May 1945 and Veit Scherzer presents the 22 May 1945.)	
Herbert Kuhlmann	SS-Sturmbannführer	I./SS-Panzer-Regiment 1 "Leibstandarte SS Adolf Hitler"	13 February 1944	—	—
Otto Kumm	SS-Obersturmbannführer	SS-Infanterie-Regiment "Der Führer"	16 February 1942	Awarded 221st Oak Leaves 6 April 1943; 138th Swords 17 March 1945	
Ortwin Kuske	SS-Untersturmführer	3./SS-Aufklärungs-Abteilung 17	26 November 1944	—	—
Josef Lainer	SS-Oberscharführer	Zugführer (platoon leader) in the 1./SS-Panzergrenadier-Regiment "Der Führer"	8 October 1943	—	—
Heinz Lammerding	SS-Oberführer	Commander of Panzer-Kampfgruppe "Das Reich"	11 April 1944	—	
Paul Landwehr	Major of the Schupo	Commander of the II./SS-Polizei-Regiment 14	17 March 1945*	Killed in action 28 February 1945	—
Hermann Lang	SS-Unterscharführer	Meldestaffelführer (messenger squad leader) in the I./SS-Panzergrenadier-Regiment 5 "Totenkopf" (Note: According to Scherzer as Meldestaffelführer (messenger squad leader) in the I./SS-Panzergrenadier-Regiment 5 "Thule".)	23 October 1944	—	—
Fritz Langanke	SS-Standartenoberjunker	Zugführer (platoon leader) of the 2./SS-Panzer-Regiment 2 "Das Reich" (Note: According to Scherzer as Zugführer (platoon leader) of the 2./SS-Panzer-Regiment 2.)	27 August 1944	—	—
Günther Lange? (Note: No evidence of the award can be found in the German Federal Archives. The award was unlawfully presented by SS-Oberstgruppenführer Sepp Dietrich. The date is taken from the announcement made by the 6. SS-Panzerarmee.)	SS-Sturmmann	Group leader in the 16.(Pi)/SS-Panzer-Regiment 4 "Der Führer"	6 May 1945	—	—
Georg Langendorf	SS-Untersturmführer of the Reserves	Leader of the 5.(schwere)/SS-Panzer-Aufklärungs-Abteilung 11 "Nordland" (Note: According to Scherzer as leader of the 5./SS-Panzer-Aufklärungs-Abteilung 11.)	12 March 1944	—	—
Bernhard Langhorst	SS-Sturmbannführer	SS-Freiwillige-Panzerjäger-Abteilung 20	5 April 1945	—	—
Kurt Launer	SS-Sturmbannführer	II./SS-Panzergrenadier-Regiment 6	15 August 1943	—	—
Rudolf Lehmann	SS-Obersturmbannführer	Ia (operations officer) of the 1. SS-Panzer-Division "Leibstandarte SS Adolf Hitler"	23 February 1944	Awarded (862nd) Oak Leaves 6 May 1945? (Note: No evidence of the award can be found in the German Federal Archives. The award was unlawfully presented by SS-Oberstgruppenführer Sepp Dietrich. The date is taken from the announcement made by the 6. SS-Panzerarmee. The sequential number "862" was assigned by the Association of Knight's Cross Recipients (AKCR). Lehmann was member of the AKCR.)	—
Jacques Leroy? (Note: No evidence regarding Jacques Leroy's nomination can be found in the German Federal Archive. A presentation, as assumed by Fellgiebel, by the chief of the Heerespersonalamt (HPA—Army Staff Office) Wilhelm Burgdorf, is very unlikely because the 28th SS Volunteer Grenadier Division Wallonien was deployed in Pomerania with the Army Group Vistula in March/April 1945 and not in or near Berlin. The author was denied access to files, which could help clarify the case, of the Association of Knight's Cross Recipients (AKCR) on the grounds of the Bundesarchivgesetz (German Archive Law). The presentation, according to Krätschmer, was confirmed by the former adjutant to the divisional commander in 1957 and divisional commander in 1973. Fellgiebel himself, in a letter dated 31 August 1976, considered this evidence as Quatsch (a hoke or nuts). Leroy was a member of the AKCR.)	SS-Untersturmführer	1./SS-Freiwillige-Panzergrenadier-Regiment 69	20 April 1945	—	—
Alfred Lex	SS-Hauptsturmführer	I./SS-Panzergrenadier-Regiment 4	10 December 1943	—	—
Karl-Heinz Lichte? (Note: No evidence of the award can be found in the German Federal Archives. According to Fellgiebel the Knight's Cross was presented by SS-Oberstgruppenführer Sepp Dietrich, which would make it an unlawful presentation. Fellgiebel states the sources Hermann Buch and Wilhelm Kment. Buch had nothing to do with this presentation (note from 25 June 2004). The 5th SS Panzer Division Wiking was not under the command of Dietrich in the respective timeframe. Krätschmer presents a presentation date of 25 March 1945 and von Seemen the 25 April 1945. Fellgiebel has changed this to the 6 May 1945. It has to be speculated whether Fellgiebel did this to hide the presentation among the Dietrich awards. Unfortunately Karl-Heinz Lichte, member of the Association of Knight's Cross Recipients (AKCR), did nothing to help clarify the situation. Two letters from the general manager of the AKCR had been sent to Lichte, the first on 24 July 2004 and the second on 22 August 2004.)	SS-Hauptsturmführer	5./SS-Panzer-Regiment 5	6 May 1945	—	—
Franz Liebisch	SS-Obersturmführer	8. SS-Kavallerie-Division	9 February 1945	—	—
Karl Liecke? (Note: No evidence of the award can be found in the German Federal Archives. Presumably the Knight's Cross was awarded on the same day as Desiderius Hampel's and Hans Hanke's, as stated in a letter from Krätschmer to von Seemen dated 7 August 1980. According to von Seemen the award was presented by General Maximilian de Angelis. Fellgiebel accepted Karl Liecke as Knight's Cross recipient but noted in his book: "A justification for the presentation was not given". Liecke was a member of the Association of Knight's Cross Recipients (AKCR).)	SS-Obersturmbannführer	Waffen-Gebirgs-Regiment 27 der SS (kroat. Nr. 1)	3 May 1945	—	—
Dr. Ing. Hans Lipinski	SS-Obersturmführer of the Reserves	11./SS-Flak-Abteilung 18	2 January 1945	—	—
Jakob Lobmeyer? (Note: Jakob Lobmeyer may have received a lawful presentation via the command chain via the Heerespersonalamt (HPA—Army Staff Office) Wilhelm Burgdorf in Berlin. Also probable is a direct presentation from Adolf Hitler. However, no evidence of the award can be found in the German Federal Archives. Veit Scherzer was denied access to files, which could help clarify the case, of the Association of Knight's Cross Recipients (AKCR) on the grounds of the Bundesarchivgesetz (German Archive Law). The order commission of the AKCR handled this case in 1973. In the 1980s Lobmeyer also claimed and requested to have received the German Cross in Gold as well as the Oak Leaves to the Knight's Cross. Walther-Peer Fellgiebel stated in a letter dated 17 December 1987: "Lobmeyer had never received the German Cross nor the Oak Leaves. He is already very well off that we list him under article 8 [a footnote in Fellgiebel's book] and keep things quiet, that he may have received the Knight's Cross in the timeframe 20 April to 30 April 1945." In the same letter he refers to Lobmeyer as Spinner (a wacko or crank). Ernst-Günther Krätschmer lists him with an approval date of 20 April 1945 and a presentation date of 28 April 1945. Gerhard von Seemen noted: "Presentation was made after the radio message receipt from commanding general SS-Obergruppenführer Friedrich Jeckeln of the V. SS Mountain Corps." SS-Obersturmführer Lobmeyer had been nominated for the Honor Roll in March by the Army Group Centre. This nomination had been approved but the presentation was never made. Lobmeyer was a member of the AKCR.)	SS-Hauptsturmführer	SS-Jagdpanzer-Abteilung 561	20 April 1945	—	—
Hanns-Heinrich Lohmann	SS-Sturmbannführer	Commander of the III./SS-Freiwilligen-Panzergrenader-Regiment 23 "Norge"	12 March 1944	Awarded (872nd) Oak Leaves 9 May 1945? (Note: The nomination was received by the Heerespersonalamt (HPA—Army Staff Office) on 25 March 1943 and was approved by the commanding general of the III. (germ.) SS-Panzerkorps. However, the approval from the commander-in-chief of the 11. Armee, Army Group Vistula and from the Reichsführer-SS is missing. The HPA created a formal nomination without a sequential number on 27 March 1945. Both nominations are retained in the National Archives. Both nominations give no information whether the nomination was approved and whether the Oak Leaves had been awarded. The nomination list of the higher grade of the Knight's Cross of the Iron Cross with Oak Leaves only dates the nomination entry on 25 March 1945. The Order Commission of the Association of Knight's Cross Recipients (AKCR) processed this case in 1974 and decided: yes, 872nd Oak Leaves. According to the AKCR the award was presented in accordance with the Dönitz-decree. This is illegal according to the Deutsche Dienststelle (WASt) and lacks legal justification. The sequential number "872" and date were assigned by the AKCR. Hanns-Heinrich Lohmann was a member of the AKCR.)	—
Gustav Lombard	SS-Obersturmbannführer	SS-Kavalllerie-Regiment 1	10 March 1943	—	
Gerhard Lotze	SS-Obersturmführer	5./SS-Panzergrenadier-Regiment 10	1 February 1945*	Killed in action 13 October 1944	—
Siegfried Lüngen	SS-Hauptscharführer	6./SS-Freiwillige-Panzergrenadier-Regiment 23	16 November 1944	—	—
Heinz Macher	SS-Untersturmführer	Leader of the 16.(Pi)/SS-Panzergrenadier-Regiment "Deutschland"	3 April 1943	Awarded 554th Oak Leaves 19 August 1944	—
Paul Maitla	Waffen-Hauptsturmführer	Leader of the I./Waffen-Grenadier-Regiment 45 of the SS (estn. Nr. 1) (Note: According to Scherzer as leader of the I./Waffen-Grenadier-Regiment of the SS 45 (estn. Nr. 1).)	23 August 1944	—	—
Hans Malkomes	SS-Obersturmführer	Chief of the 2./SS-Panzer-Regiment 1 "Leibstandarte SS Adolf Hitler" (Note: According to Scherzer as chief of the 2./SS-Panzer-Regiment 1.)	30 October 1944	—	—
Hermann Maringgele	SS-Hauptscharführer	Zugführer (platoon leader) in the 2./SS-Kavallerie-Regiment 15 "Florian Geyer" (Note: According to Scherzer as Zugführer (platoon leader) in the 2./SS-Kavallerie-Regiment 15.)	21 February 1945	—	—
Lino Masarié	SS-Hauptsturmführer	Leader of SS-Panzer-Aufklärungs-Abteilung 3 "Totenkopf" (Note: According to Scherzer as leader Aufklärungs-Abteilung of the "Totenkopf"-Division.)	3 April 1943	—	A man wearing a military uniform, peaked cap and neck order, in the shape of a cross. His cap has an emblem in shape of a human skull and crossed bones.
Walter Mattern	SS-Obersturmführer	Leader of the 7./SS-Panzer-Regiment 3 "Totenkopf" (Note: According to Scherzer as leader of the 7./SS-Panzer-Regiment 3.)	20 October 1944	—	—
Walter Mattusch? (Note: No evidence of the award can be found in the German Federal Archives. The award was unlawfully presented by SS-Oberstgruppenführer Sepp Dietrich. The date is taken from the announcement made by the 6. SS-Panzerarmee.)	SS-Hauptsturmführer	Commander of the II./SS-Panzergrenadier-Regiment 3 "Deutschland"	6 May 1945	—	—
Hubert-Erwin Meierdress	SS-Obersturmführer	Leader of SS-Sturmgeschütz-Batterie "Totenkopf" (Note: According to Scherzer as leader of Sturmgeschütz-Batterie SS-Division-"Totenkopf".)	13 March 1942	Awarded 310th Oak Leaves 5 October 1943; Killed in action 4 January 1945	—
Hans Meyer	SS-Hauptsturmführer	Leader of the I./SS-Freiwilligen-Panzergrenadier-Regiment 49 "De Ruyter" (Note: According to Scherzer as leader of the I./SS-Freiwilligen-Panzergrenadier-Regiment 49 "De Ruyter" (niederl. Nr. 2).)	2 September 1944	—	—
Kurt Meyer	SS-Sturmbannführer	SS-Aufklärungs-Abteilung "Leibstandarte SS Adolf Hitler"	18 May 1941	Awarded 195th Oak Leaves 23 February 1943; 91st Swords 27 August 1944	A smiling man wearing a military uniform, peaked cap and neck order, in the shape of a cross.
Otto Meyer	SS-Obersturmbannführer	SS-Panzer-Regiment 9	4 June 1944	Awarded 601st Oak Leaves 30 September 1944; Killed in action 29 August 1944 (Note: Otto Meyer's date of death is inconclusive. According to Walther-Per Fellgiebel date of death is 24 August 1944 while Veit Scherzer presents the 29 August 1944.)	A man wearing a military uniform, cap and a neck order in the shape of a cross. His cap has an emblem in shape of a human skull and crossed bones.
Werner Meyer	SS-Obersturmführer	1./SS-Panzergrenadier-Regiment 9	4 May 1944	—	—
Berndt Lubich von Milovan	SS-Obersturmführer	1./SS-Sturmgeschütz-Abteilung 3	14 October 1943	—	—
Erhard Mösslacher	SS-Obersturmführer	6./SS-Kavallerie-Regiment 16	9 February 1945	—	—
Wilhelm Mohnke	SS-Obersturmbannführer	SS-Panzergrenadier-Regiment 26	11 July 1944	—	—
Gerardus Mooyman	SS-Sturmmann	14./SS-Freiwillige-Legion "Nederland"	20 February 1943	—	—
Karl Mühleck	SS-Untersturmführer	2./SS.Panzergrenadier-Regiment 2	4 June 1944	—	—
Johannes-Rudolf Mühlenkamp	SS-Sturmbannführer	SS-Panzer-Abteilung 5	3 September 1942	Awarded 596th Oak Leaves 21 September 1944	—
Albert Müller	SS-Hauptscharführer	4./SS-Panzergrenadier-Regiment 10	4 August 1943	—	—
Heinz Müller	SS-Hauptsturmführer	III./SS-Panzergrenadier-Regiment 6	23 March 1945*	Killed in action 17 March 1945	—
Siegfried Müller	SS-Sturmbannführer	SS-Panzergrenadier-Regiment 25	19 December 1944	—	—
Heinz Murr	SS-Hauptsturmführer	III./SS-Panzergrenadier-Regiment 9	21 September 1944	—	—
Eggert Neumann	SS-Sturmbannführer of the Reserves	Commander of SS-Gebirgs-Aufklärungs-Abteilung 7 "Prinz Eugen" (Note: According to Scherzer as commander of SS-Gebirgs-Aufklärungs-Abteilung 7.)	3 November 1944	—	—
Karl Nicolussi-Leck	SS-Obersturmführer	Chief of the 8./SS-Panzer-Regiment 5 "Wiking" (Note: According to Scherzer as chief of the 8./SS-Panzer-Regiment 5.)	9 April 1944	—	—
Alfred Nowak	SS-Oberscharführer of the Reserves	Zugführer (platoon leader) of the 3./SS-Reiter-Regiment 1 "Florian Geyer" (Note: According to Scherzer as Zugführer (platoon leader) of the 3./SS-Reiter-Regiment 1.)	1 November 1943*	Killed in action 13 September 1943	—
Heinz Nowotnik	SS-Untersturmführer of the Reserves	Leader of the 14.(MG)/SS-Panzergrenadier-Regiment 1 "Leibstandarte SS Adolf Hitler" (Note: According to Scherzer as leader of the 14./SS-Panzergrenadier-Regiment 1 "Leibstandarte SS Adolf Hitler".)	14 May 1944	—	—
Harald Nugiseks	Waffen-Unterscharführer (Note: According to Scherzer as Waffen-Untersturmführer.)	Zugführer (platoon leader) in the 1./SS-Freiwilligen-Grenadier-Regiment 46 (estn. Nr. 2)	9 April 1944	—	
Alois Obschil	SS-Obersturmführer (Note: According to Scherzer as SS-Untersturmführer.)	Leader of the 2./Grenadier-Regiment 1126	28 March 1945	—	—
Erich Olboeter	SS-Sturmbannführer	Commander of the III.(gepanzert)/Panzergrenadier-Regiment 26 "Hitlerjugend"	28 July 1944	—	—
Werner Ostendorff	SS-Obersturmbannführer	Ia (operational officer) of SS-Division "Das Reich"	13 September 1941	Awarded (861st) Oak Leaves 6 May 1945 (Note: No evidence of the award to Werner Ostendorff can be found in the German Federal Archives. The award was unlawfully presented by SS-Oberstgruppenführer Sepp Dietrich. The date is taken from the announcement made by the 6. SS-Panzerarmee. The sequential number "861" was assigned by the Association of Knight's Cross Recipients (AKCR).); Died of wounds 1 May 1945	A man wearing a military uniform, peaked cap and a neck order in the shape of a cross. His cap has an emblem in shape of a human skull and crossed bones.
Otto Paetsch	SS-Obersturmbannführer	SS-Panzer-Regiment 10	23 August 1944	Awarded 820th Oak Leaves 5 April 1945; Killed in action 16 March 1945	—
Harry Paletta	SS-Obersturmführer	SS-Sturmgeschütz-Batterie 1007	26 November 1944	—	—
Rudolf Pannier	Major	I./SS-Polizei-Schtützen-Regiment 2	11 May 1942	—	A man wearing a military uniform, facing left of the viewer. Dressed in German World War II Officer uniform with a neck order in the shape of a cross.
Fred Papas	SS-Untersturmführer	SS-Panzer-Aufklärungs-Abteilung 17	27 December 1944	—	—
Adolf Peichl	SS-Hauptscharführer	12. (Gep.)/SS-Panzergrenadier-Regiment 4	16 October 1944	—	—
Joachim Peiper	SS-Sturmbannführer	III. (Gep.)/SS-Panzergrenadier-Regiment 2	9 March 1943	Awarded 377th Oak Leaves 27 January 1944; 119th Swords 11 January 1945	A man wearing a military uniform, peaked cap and a neck order in the shape of a cross. His cap has an emblem in shape of a human skull and crossed bones.
Heinrich Petersen	SS-Obersturmbannführer	SS-Gebirgsjäger-Regiment 1	13 November 1943	—	—
Otto Petersen	SS-Hauptsturmführer	II./SS-Freiwillige-Panzergrenadier-Regiment 49	11 December 1944	—	—
Karl Pfeffer-Wildenbruch	SS-Obergruppenführer	IX. SS-Gebirgskorps	11 January 1945	Awarded 723rd Oak Leaves 1 February 1945	A man in semi profile wearing a military uniform and various military decorations. He has short, thinning hair.
Helmut Pförtner	SS-Obersturmführer	6./SS-Regiment "Germania"	18 January 1942	—	—
Artur Phleps	SS-Gruppenführer	SS-Division "Prinz Eugen"	4 July 1943	Awarded 670th Oak Leaves 24 November 1944; Killed in action 21 September 1944	
Harry Phönix	SS-Hauptsturmführer	II./SS-Artillerie-Regiment 8	21 February 1945	—	—
Karl Picus	SS-Obersturmführer	SS-Panzer-Regiment 5	17 April 1945	—	—
Walter Pitsch? (Note: No evidence of the award can be found in the German Federal Archives. According to Walther-Peer Fellgiebel the award was presumably awarded by SS-Oberstgruppenführer Sepp Dietrich, which would make it unlawful. Fellgiebel names Hermann Buch, the former IIa (personnel administration) of the 2. SS-Division "Das Reich", and Wilhelm Kment as sources. Buch stated on 25 June 2006 that he has nothing to do with this presentation. Walter Pitsch is mentioned the first in Ernst-Günther Krätschmer 2nd edition of "Die Ritterkreuzträger der Waffen-SS—The Knight's Cross Bearers of the Waffen-SS". The Association of Knight's Cross Recipients (AKCR) initially did not accept Pitsch as a recipient since he was not listed in Gerhard von Seemen's 2nd edition of "Die Ritterkreuzträger 1939–1945—The Knight's Cross Bearers 1939–1945". The order commission of the AKCR processed the case in 1977 and decided: "Knight's Cross yes, 3 May 1945". The presentation date was later changed by Fellgiebel to 6 May 1945. Krätschmer who does not present a source for Pritsch's listing also states 6 May 1945. Unfortunately Pritsch, a member of the AKCR, did not help clarify the situation. Twice, on 24 July 2004 and 22 July 2004, did he not respond to a request from the president of the AKCR.)	SS-Hauptscharführer	4./SS-Flak-Artillerie-Abteilung 1	6 May 1945	—	—
Adolf Pittschellis	SS-Sturmbannführer	SS-Panzerjäger-Abteilung 3	23 August 1944	—	—
Gerhard Pleiß	SS-Obersturmführer	1./"Leibstandarte SS Adolf Hitler" (mot.)	20 April 1941	—	A man in semi profile standing in front of a tree and wearing a military uniform, peaked cap and a neck order in the shape of a cross. His cap has an emblem in shape of a human skull and crossed bones.
Werner Pötschke	SS-Hauptsturmführer	1./SS-Panzer-Regiment 1	4 June 1944	Awarded 783rd Oak Leaves 15 March 1945; Killed in action 24 March 1945 (Note: Werner Pötschke's date of death is inconclusive. According to Walther-Per Fellgiebel date of death is 21 March 1945 while Veit Scherzer presents the 24 March 1945.)	—
Harry Polewacz	SS-Sturmbannführer	III./SS-Panzergrenadier-Regiment "Nordland"	23 December 1942	—	—
Hermann Potschka	SS-Sturmbannführer of the Reserves	II./SS-Freiwillige-Panzer-Artillerie-Regiment 11	26 December 1944	—	—
Otto Prager	SS-Sturmbannführer	SS-Polizei-Panzergrenadier-Regiment 7	9 December 1944	—	—
Georg Preuß	SS-Obersturmführer	10.(Gep.)/SS-Panzergrenadier-Regiment 2	5 February 1945	—	—
Hermann Prieß	SS-Oberführer	SS-Panzer-Artillerie-Regiment 3	28 April 1943	Awarded 297th Oak Leaves 9 September 1943; 65th Swords 24 April 1944	
Karl-Heinz Prinz	SS-Sturmbannführer	II./SS-Panzer-Regiment 12	11 July 1944	—	—
Felix Przedwojewski	SS-Unterscharführer	2./SS-Sturmgeschütz-Abteilung 3	16 December 1943	—	—
Gustav-Peter Reber? (Note: No evidence of the award can be found in the German Federal Archives. According to Krätschmer (letter to von Seemen dated 7 August 1980) the award was presented together with the Oak Leaves to Matthias Kleinheisterkamp. Presumably the announcement was made via radio transmission on 28 April 1945 from the Führer Headquarters in Berlin to the 9. Armee (9th Army) in the Halbe pocket. The radio transmissions received by the AOK 9 (Armeeoberkommando 9 — high command of the 9th army) in April 1945 were not retained. All communication to the Führerbunker in Berlin were out of order as of 5AM on 28 April. The order commission of the Association of Knight's Cross Recipients (AKCR) processed the case in 1981 and decided: "Knight's Cross yes, 28 April 1945", Gustav-Peter Reber was a member of the AKCR.)	SS-Obersturmführer	XI SS Panzer Corps	28 April 1945	—	—
Erich Rech	SS-Oberscharführer	2./SS-Panzer-Aufklärungs-Abteilung 10	23 August 1944	—	—
Walter Reder	SS-Hauptsturmführer	I.(Gep.)/SS-Panzergrenadier-Regiment 5	3 April 1943	—	
Adolf Reeb	SS-Untersturmführer	7./SS-Panzer-Regiment 2	23 August 1944	—	A man wearing a military uniform, side cap and neck order in the shape of a cross. His cap has an emblem in shape of a human skull and crossed bones.
Erwin Reichel	SS-Sturmbannführer	SS-Panzergrenadier-Regiment "Westland"	28 February 1943	Died of wounds 28 February 1943	—
Hans Reimling	SS-Oberscharführer	2./SS-Panzer-Regiment 1	28 February 1943	—	A man wearing a military uniform, peaked cap and a neck order in the shape of a cross. His cap has an emblem in shape of a human skull and crossed bones.
Leo-Hermann Reinhold	SS-Sturmbannführer	II./SS-Panzer-Regiment 10	16 October 1944	—	—
Voldemars Reinholds? (Note: Voldemars Reinholds' nomination by the troop was received by Heerespersonalamt (HPA—Army Staff Office) on 25 March 1945. The HPA created a nomination numbered 4940 on 30 March 1945. A file card listing the same information is filed among the rejected nominations. The column verliehen (Awarded) in the book "Verliehene Ritterkreuze" (Awarded Knight Crosses) is blank. No proof exists that the Knight's Cross was awarded. The presentation date was assigned by the Association of Knight's Cross Recipients (AKCR))	Waffen-Sturmbannführer	Waffen-Grenadier-Regiment der SS 43 "Hinrich Schuldt" (lett. Nr. 2)	11 May 1945	—	—
Paul Reißmann	SS-Oberscharführer	4./SS-Kavallerie-Regiment 17	16 November 1944*	Died of wounds 8 November 1944	—
Hans Reiter	SS-Untersturmführer	SS-Panzergrenadier-Regiment 21	23 August 1944*	Killed in action 15 August 1944	—
Albin Freiherr von Reitzenstein	SS-Obersturmbannführer	SS-Panzer-Regiment 2	13 November 1943	—	—
Fritz Rentrop	SS-Obersturmführer	2./SS-Flak-Abteilung 2	13 October 1941	—	A man wearing a military uniform, side cap and neck order in the shape of a cross. His cap has an emblem in shape of a human skull and crossed bones.
Gottlieb Renz	SS-Hauptsturmführer	SS-Schützen-Bataillon 6	12 August 1944	—	—
Rudolf Rettberg? (Note: No evidence of the award can be found in the German Federal Archives. Presumably the award was presented by SS-Oberstgruppenführer Sepp Dietrich which would make it an unlawful presentation. The author was denied access to files, which could help clarify the case, of the Association of Knight's Cross Recipients (AKCR) on the grounds of the Bundesarchivgesetz (German Archive Law). The presentation date 6 May 1945 was assigned by Fellgiebel. Scherzer questions whether this was done to place Rudolf Rettberg among the Sepp Dietrichawards. Krätschmer and von Seemen state the 1 May 1945.)	SS-Sturmbannführer	II./SS-Panzer-Regiment 9	6 May 1945	—	—
Karl Rettlinger	SS-Hauptsturmführer	3./SS-Sturmgeschütz-Abteilung 1	20 December 1943	—	—
Rudolf von Ribbentrop	SS-Obersturmführer	6./SS-Panzer-Regiment 1	15 July 1943	—	—
Friedrich Richter? (Note: The nomination by the troop via teleprinter message was sent on 25 March 1945, according to file card on 28 March 1945, according to the book "Verliehene Ritterkreuze" (Awarded Knight Crosses) on 5 April 1945. The nomination was returned to the HPA/P5a (Army personnel office) by SS-Obersturmbannführer Kment with the approval of Heinrich Himmler on 29 April 1945. Retained by the German Federal Archive are four identical copies listing the approval of Friedrich Richter's divisional commander Heinz Harmel and the Reichsführer SS, as well as three almost finished nominations by the HPA. Missing is the confirmation of the commander-in-chief of the 9. Armee and Army Group Vistula. The nomination of the HPA Nr. 4729 is listed in the book "Verliehene Ritterkreuze" (Awarded Knight Crosses), however lacks reference to this number and remained unfinished by the end of the war. The order commission of the Association of Knight's Cross Recipients (AKCR) processed this case in 1977 and decided "Knight's Cross yes, 6 May 1945". Fellgiebel later changed this date again. Krätschmer lists the 9 May 1945. Richter was a member of the AKCR.)	SS-Sturmbannführer	III./SS-Panzergrenadier-Regiment 21	9 May 1945	—	—
Joachim Richter	SS-Obersturmbannführer of the Reserves	SS-Panzer-Artillerie-Regiment 5	23 February 1944	—	—
Wilfried Richter	SS-Obersturmführer	SS-Sturmgeschütz-Batterie "Totenkpopf"	21 April 1942	—	—
Franz Riedel	SS-Obersturmführer	7./SS-Panzer-Regiment 10	28 March 1945	—	—
Waldemar Riefkogel	SS-Obersturmführer	1./SS-Panzer-Regiment 3	11 July 1943	—	—
Fritz Rieflin? (Note: No evidence regarding the presentation of the Knight's Cross of the Iron Cross to Fritz Rieflin can be found in the German Federal Archive. Fellgiebel also had no evidence and wrote on 11 July 1983 to Mr. Eichhorn: "I have to rely on Krätschmer in Rieflin's case...". Unlawful presentation by SS-Oberstgruppenführer Sepp Dietrich. The date is taken from the announcement made by the 6. SS-Panzerarmee. Rieflin was a member of the Association of Knight's Cross Recipients (AKCR).)	SS-Obersturmführer	2./SS-Panzer-Pionier-Bataillon 2	6 May 1945	—	—
Alfrēds Riekstiņš	Waffen-Unterscharführer	1./Waffen-Füsilier-Bataillon 19	28 April 1945	—	
Julius Riepe	SS-Sturmbannführer	I./SS-Panzergrenadier-Regiment 40	13 January 1945	—	—
Herbert-Albert Rieth	SS-Untersturmführer	5./SS-Freiwillige-Artillerie-Regiment 54	11 December 1944	—	—
Harald Riipalu	Waffen-Obersturmbannführer	SS-Freiwillige-Grenadier-Regiment 45	23 August 1944	—	
Dr. Wolfgang Röhder	SS-Obersturmführer	3./SS-Sturmgeschütz-Abteilung 2	1 December 1943	—	—
Josef Rölleke	SS-Unterscharführer	III./SS-Panzergrenadier-Regiment 5	16 June 1944	—	—
Erwin Franz Rudolf Roestel? (Note: No evidence regarding the presentation of the Knight's Cross of the Iron Cross to Erwin Franz Roestel can be found in the German Federal Archive. Walther-Peer Fellgiebel states about Roestel: "Presentation Heeresgruppe Mitte before 3 May 1945", thus making it unlawful. Fellgiebel certified, as head of the order commission of the Association of Knight's Cross Recipients (AKCR), in a letter dated 11 June 1974 to Roestel that the AKCR has accepted him as a recipient of the Knight's Cross of the Iron, legitimized by the Dönitz-decree. The files of the AKCR reveal the following facts: Roestel assumed that Ferdinand Schörner had nominated him for the Knight's Cross in April 1945 because Schörner had said he would do so: " ... Schörner and I were standing with the famous test pilot Hanna Reitsch ... at a street in Marklissa ... Schörner then asked me ... Why don't you have the Knight's Cross already?... I answered: Because I am an assault artillerist. ... But this time ... you will definitely get the Knight's Cross, because I will take care of it!", so Schörner. Roestel therefore strongly believes that Schörner had nominated him. To the question, why the presentation was not made before the war ended, Roestel answered: "I can only assume that his nomination for my Knight's Cross was lost." Roestel sent an affidavit 24 years later to Schörner asking him for confirmation. Schörner answered: "Even though I cannot remember every detail I can confirm the factual content ... in all relevant points. The presentation to Roestel, based on my nomination, was the last honor bestowed by the 10th SS Panzer Division Frundsberg." Veit Scherzer concluded: Schörner did not confirm that he made the presentation to Roestel. He claimed to have made a nomination. Therefore it cannot be a direct presentation by Schörner himself. This leaves two alternatives, a presentation via the command chain or a direct presentation by Hitler. A nomination by the troop via the Heerespersonalamt (HPA—Army Staff Office) is not verifiable. A presentation via the command chain must therefore be ruled out. Roestel's reference to Hanna Reitsch, who managed to evacuate Feldmarschall Robert Ritter von Greim from Berlin on 28 April 1945, indicates that the meeting of Roestel, Reitsch and Schörner could only have taken place after 28 April. This however rules out a direct presentation by Hitler. All the radio connection to the Führerbunker were down since 5:00 on 28 April 1945. According to the AKCR the award was presented in accordance with the Dönitz-decree. This is illegal according to the Deutsche Dienststelle (WASt) and lacks legal justification. The presentation date "3 May 1945" was assigned by Fellgiebel. Roestel was a member of the AKCR.)	SS-Obersturmbannführer	SS-Panzerjäger-Abteilung 10	3 May 1945	—	—
Alfred Roge? (Note: Only a copy of the teleprinter message submitted nomination by the troop to the Heerespersonalamt (HPA—Army Staff Office) was retained. There is not a single comment or indication on this copy indicating that the nomination was further processed. A file card listing the same information is filed among the rejected nominations. According to the Association of Knight's Cross Recipients (AKCR) the award was presented in accordance with the Dönitz-decree. This is illegal according to the Deutsche Dienststelle (WASt) and lacks legal justification. The presentation date was copied by Fellgiebel and Krätschmer.)	SS-Obersturmführer	1./SS-Festungs-Regiment 1 "Besslein" in the Fortress Breslau	9 May 1945	Died of wounds 12 May 1945	—
Erich Rossner	SS-Unterscharführer	2./SS-Panzerjäger-Abteilung 2	25 August 1941	—	—
Rudolf Rott	SS-Obersturmführer	1./SS-Panzer-Abteilung 11	28 February 1945	—	—
Rudolf Roy	SS-Oberscharführer	1./SS-Panzerjäger-Abteilung 12	16 October 1944	—	—
Karl Rubatscher	SS-Obersturmführer	I./SS-Grenadier-Regiment 8	27 December 1943	—	—
Richard Rudolf	SS-Oberscharführer	SS-Panzerjäger-Abteilung 12	18 November 1944	—	—
Adolf Rüd	SS-Oberscharführer	Stabskompanie/SS-Panzergrenadier-Regiment 3	23 August 1944*	Killed in action 2 August 1944	—
Dr. rer. pol. Hans-Joachim Rühle von Lilienstern	SS-Hauptsturmführer	I./niederl. SS-Freiwillige-Panzergrenadier-Regiment 48	12 February 1944	—	—
Hugo Ruf	SS-Oberscharführer	3./SS-Panzer-Regiment 5	16 October 1944	—	—
Joachim Rumohr	SS-Obersturmbannführer	SS-Artillerie-Regiment 8	16 January 1944	Awarded 721st Oak Leaves 1 February 1945; Suicide 11 February 1945	A man in semi profile wearing a military uniform and neck order, in the shape of a cross. His hair is combed to the back.
Rudolf Saalbach	SS-Hauptsturmführer	SS-Panzer-Aufklärungs-Abteilung 11	12 March 1944	—	—
Rudolf Säumenicht	SS-Hauptsturmführer	2./SS-Panzer-Regiment 3	13 October 1943	—	—
Johann Sailer? (Note: No evidence of the award to Johann Sailer can be found in the German Federal Archives. According to Fellgiebel presumably awarded by SS-Oberstgruppenführer Sepp Dietrich, which would make it an unlawful presentation. The sources for this assumption are Hermann Buch and Wilhelm Kment. According to Buch—note from 25 June 2005—he has nothing to do with this presentation. And Kment can't be the source, since Buch stated that Kment died in the early 1970s. If indeed Kment would have been the source then von Seemen would have listed Sailer in either the first or second edition of his book, which isn't the case. Sailer himself states in his book "Kriegslebenslauf" (war diary) that he received the award on 4 May 1945. Fellgiebel dated the award on 6 May 1945. He may have done this to justify this as an Dietrich award. Krätschmer lists Sailer for the first time in the 3rd edition of his book without referencing a source. Sailer also claims to have received the German Cross in Gold on 19 March 1945, which also cannot be verified. Author Manfred Dörr was given insight into Sailer's pay book and noticed that the Knight's Cross entry was formally incorrect. The entry thus doesn't appear to be authentic. Sailer was a member of the Association of Knight's Cross Recipients (AKCR).)	SS-Obersturmführer	3./SS-Panzerjäger-Abteilung 9	6 May 1945	—	—
Kurt Sametreiter	SS-Oberscharführer	3. (schw.)/SS-Panzerjäger-Abteilung 1	31 July 1943	—	A man wearing a military uniform, peaked cap and a neck order in the shape of a cross. His cap has an emblem in shape of a human skull and crossed bones.
Rudolf Sandig	SS-Sturmbannführer	II./SS-Panzergrenadier-Regiment 2	5 May 1943	—	—
Karl Sattler	SS-Sturmbannführer	SS-Regiment "Sattler"	16 January 1945	—	—
Hans Schabschneider	SS-Unterscharführer	5./SS-Panzer-Artillerie-Regiment 2	27 August 1944	—	—
Max Schachner	SS-Obersturmführer of the Reserves	2./SS-Panzerjäger-Abteilung 8	14 May 1944	—	—
Ernst Schäfer	SS-Sturmbannführer	III./SS-Infanterie-Regiment 10 (mot.)	14 October 1943	—	
Max Schäfer	SS-Obersturmbannführer	SS-Panzer-Pionier-Bataillon 5	12 February 1943	Awarded 714th Oak Leaves 25 January 1945	—
Oskar Schäfer	SS-Untersturmführer	3./schwere SS-Panzer-Abteilung 503	29 April 1945	—	—
Siegfried Scheibe? (Note: Siegfried Scheibe's nomination was received by the Heerespersonalamt (HPA—Army Staff Office) on 2 April 1945, the number 5047 had been created and according to the file card forwarded for further processing on 11 April 1945. No further comments or notes indicate that the nomination was finalized. Mr Meentz of the German Federal Archive stated on 20 July 2004 that it cannot be verified that Scheibe received the Knight's Cross. Fellgiebel assigned the presentation date. Krätschmer claims that the award was approved on 9 May 1945.)	SS-Obersturmbannführer	SS-Freiwillige-Panzergrenadier-Regiment 48	11 May 1945*	Killed in action 17 April 1945	—
Conrad Schellong	SS-Obersturmbannführer	SS-Freiwillige-Sturmbrigade "Langemarck"	28 February 1945	—	—
Johannes Scherg	SS-Obersturmführer	1./SS-Polizei-Panzer-Aufklärungs-Abteilung 4	23 October 1944	—	—
Franz Scherzer	SS-Obersturmführer	I./SS-Panzergrenadier-Regiment 10	28 March 1945	—	—
Karl Schlamelcher	SS-Sturmbannführer	III./SS-Artillerie-Regiment 5	1 March 1942	—	—
Wilhelm Schlüter	SS-Sturmbannführer	SS-Artillerie-Regiment 54 "Nederland"	23 August 1944	—	—
Georg Schluifelder	SS-Standartenoberjunker	1./SS-Freiwillige-Panzergrenadier-Regiment 49	26 November 1944	—	—
Heinrich Schmelzer	SS-Obersturmführer of the Reserves	2./SS-Panzer-Kampfgruppe "Das Reich"	12 March 1944	Awarded 756th Oak Leaves 28 February 1945	—
Walter Schmidt	SS-Hauptsturmführer	III./SS-Panzergrenadier-Regiment 10	4 August 1943	Awarded 479th Oak Leaves 14 May 1944	—
Alois Schnaubelt	SS-Unterscharführer	3./SS-Flak-Abteilung 5	16 November 1944	—	—
Otto Schneider	SS-Obersturmführer	7./SS-Panzer-Regiment 5	4 May 1944	—	—
Alfred Schneidereit	SS-Rottenführer	8./SS-Panzer-Gruppe 1	20 December 1943	—	—
Georg Schönberger	SS-Obersturmbannführer	SS-Panzer-Regiment 1	20 December 1943	—	A man wearing a military uniform and side cap. His cap has an emblem in shape of a human skull and crossed bones.
Manfred Schönfelder	SS-Obersturmbannführer	Ia of the 5. SS-Panzer-Division "Wiking"	23 February 1944	—	A man in semi profile wearing a military uniform and neck order, in the shape of a cross. His hair is combed to the back.
Fritz von Scholz Edler von Rarancze	SS-Oberführer	SS-Regiment "Nordland"	18 January 1942	Awarded 423rd Oak Leaves 12 March 1944; 85th Swords 8 August 1944; Died of wounds 28 July 1944	—
Helmut Scholz	SS-Untersturmführer	7./SS-Freiwillige-Panzergrenadier-Regiment 49	4 June 1944	Awarded 591st Oak Leaves 21 September 1944	—
Franz Schreiber	SS-Standartenführer	SS-Gebirgsjäger-Regiment 12	26 December 1944	—	—
Gustav Schreiber	SS-Hauptscharführer	7./SS-Panzergrenadier-Regiment 9	2 December 1943	—	A man wearing a peaked cap with skull emblem, a military uniform with various military decorations and an Iron Cross displayed at the front of his uniform collar.
Helmuth Schreiber	SS-Hauptsturmführer	10./SS-Panzergrenadier-Regiment 3	30 July 1943	—	—
Richard (Remi) Schrijnen	SS-Sturmmann	SS-Freiwillige-Sturmbrigade "Langemarck"	21 September 1944	—	—
Joachim Schubach	SS-Sturmbannführer	II./SS-Panzergrenadier-Regiment 5	3 April 1943	—	—
Karl Schümers	SS-Sturmbannführer	II./SS-Polizei-Schützen-Regiment 1	30 September 1942	—	—
Hinrich Schuldt	SS-Obersturmbannführer	SS-Totenkopf-Regiment 4	5 April 1942	Awarded 220th Oak Leaves 2 April 1943; 56th Swords 25 March 1944; Killed in action 15 March 1944	—
Karlheinz Schulz-Streeck? (Note: Karlheinz Schulz-Streeck was nominated by the commander-in-chief North via teleprinter message on 11 May 1945. The Heerespersonalamt Außenstelle (HPA/A—Branch of the Army Staff Office) received the message on 13 May 1945. There is no further indication available that the nomination was processed or awarded. Schulz-Streeck is not listed on the HPA/A presentation list. The registry of rejected or deferred nominations contains his nomination file card only. According to the Association of Knight's Cross Recipients (AKCR) the presentation was made in accordance with the Dönitz-decree. This is illegal according to the Deutsche Dienststelle (WASt) and lacks legal justification. The presentation date was assigned by Walther-Peer Fellgiebel. Schulz-Streeck was a member of the AKCR.)	SS-Sturmbannführer	SS-Sturmgeschütz-Abteilung 11	9 May 1945	—	—
Hans-Christian Schulze	SS-Standartenführer	SS-Polizei-Schützen-Regiment 2	11 September 1941	Died of wounds 13 September 1941	—
Herbert Schulze	SS-Sturmbannführer	II./SS-Panzergrenadier-Regiment 4	16 December 1943	—	—
Kurt Schumacher	SS-Untersturmführer	3./SS-Panzer-Regiment 5	4 May 1944	—	—
Oskar Schwappacher	SS-Hauptsturmführer	V./SS-Artillerie-Ausbildungs und Ersatz-Regiment	26 December 1944	—	—
Willi Schweitzer? (Note: No evidence of the award can be found in the German Federal Archives. Fellgiebel claims that the award was presented by SS-Brigadeführer Wilhelm Mohnke in the Bunker of the Reich Chancellery. Willi Schweitzer however and his unit where stationed southwest of Rechnitz and had nothing to do with the Reich Chancellery. The presentation date, according to Krätschmer, is the 14 April 1945. Schweitzer is not listed in either issues of "von Seemen". The author was denied access to the files of the Association of Knight's Cross Recipients (AKCR) on the grounds of the Bundesarchivgesetz (German Archive Law).)	SS-Sturmbannführer	SS-Panzergrenadier Ausbildungs-Bataillon 11	24 April 1945	—	—
Walter Seebach	SS-Obersturmführer	5./SS-Freiwillige-Panzergrenadier-Regiment 24	12 March 1944	—	—
Max Seela	SS-Hauptsturmführer	3./SS-Pionier-Bataillon 3	3 May 1942	—	a man wearing a military uniform with various military decorations including an Iron Cross at his neck.
Emil Seibold? (Note: No evidence of the award can be found in the German Federal Archives. The award was unlawfully presented by SS-Oberstgruppenführer Sepp Dietrich. The order commission of the Association of Knight's Cross Recipients (AKCR) processed the case in 1982 and decided: "Knight's Cross yes, 6 May 1945". The date is taken from the announcement made by the 6. SS-Panzerarmee. Seibold was a member of the AKCR.)	SS-Hauptscharführer	8./SS-Panzer-Regiment 2	6 May 1945	—	—
Rudolf Seitz	SS-Unterscharführer	1./SS-Polizei-Panzerjäger-Abteilung 4	21 October 1942	—	—
Paul Senghas	SS-Obersturmführer	1./SS-Panzer-Regiment 5	11 December 1944	—	—
Kārlis Sensbergs? (Note: According to Scherzer Kārlis Sensbergs' last name is spelled Senbergs. His nomination to the Knight's Cross by the troop was received by teleprinter on 5 April 1945. According to the file card it was immediately forwarded for further processing. The file card of the Heerespersonalamt (HPA—Army Staff Office) was not retained and remained unfinished by the end of the war. Mr Meentz of the German Federal Archive stated on 20 July 2004 that it cannot be verified that Senbergs received the Knight's Cross. The order commission of the Association of Knight's Cross Recipients (AKCR) processed the case in 1981 and decided: "Knight's Cross yes, 9 May 1945". While Krätschmer also states the 9 May 1945, Fellgiebel changed this again later.)	Waffen-Unterscharführer	19. Waffen-Grenadier-Division der SS (lett. Nr. 2)	11 May 1945	—	—
Bernhard Siebken	SS-Obersturmbannführer	SS-Panzergrenadier-Regiment 2	17 April 1945	—	—
Hans Siegel	SS-Hauptsturmführer	8./SS-Panzer-Regiment 12	23 August 1944	—	—
Alfred Siegling	SS-Oberscharführer	1./SS-Panzer-Aufklärungs-Abteilung 2	2 December 1943	—	—
Hans Sigmund	SS-Oberscharführer	11./SS-Panzergrenadier-Regiment 9	5 April 1944	—	—
Willy Simke	SS-Hauptscharführer	5./SS-Panzer-Regiment 2	16 December 1943	—	—
Max Simon	SS-Oberführer	SS-Totenkopf-Infanterie-Regiment 1	20 October 1941	Awarded 639th Oak Leaves 28 October 1944	A man wearing a military uniform, glasses, side cap and neck order in the shape of a cross. His cap has an emblem in shape of a human skull and crossed bones.
Günther Sitter	SS-Hauptsturmführer	II./SS-Panzergrenadier-Regiment 10	12 September 1943	—	—
Dipl-Ing. Otto Skorzeny	SS-Hauptsturmführer	Sonderverband z.b.V. Friedenthal	13 September 1943	Awarded 826th Oak Leaves 9 April 1945	A man in semi profile wearing a military uniform, steel helmet and a neck order in the shape of a cross.
Heinrich Sonne	SS-Obersturmführer	1. SS-Infanterie-Brigade	10 December 1943	—	—
Ludwig Spindler	SS-Sturmbannführer	I./SS-Panzer-Artillerie-Regiment 9	27 September 1944	—	—
Richard Spörle	SS-Hauptsturmführer	II./SS-Freiwillige-Panzergrenadier-Regiment "Norge"	16 November 1944	—	—
Casper Sporck	SS-Unterscharführer	5./SS-Freiwillige-Panzer-Aufklärungs-Abteilung 11	23 October 1944	—	—
Heinrich Springer	SS-Hauptsturmführer	3./SS-Infanterie-Regiment "Leibstandarte SS Adolf Hitler"	12 January 1942	—	—
Sylvester Stadler	SS-Sturmbannführer	Commander of the II./SS-Panzergrenadier-Regiment "Der Führer"	6 April 1943	Awarded 303rd Oak Leaves 16 September 1943 (152nd) Swords 6 May 1945? (Note: No evidence of the award can be found in the German Federal Archives, also not mentioned by the order commission of the Association of Knight's Cross Recipients (AKCR). According to Walther-Peer Fellgiebel, the award was presented by SS-Oberstgruppenführer Sepp Dietrich, which would make it an unlawful presentation. Fellgiebel is referring to H. Buch and W. Kment as sources. Buch reported on 25 June 2004 that he had not had anything to do with this case. Stadler himself claimed that Dietrich proposed him on 22 March 1945, even though the 9. SS-Panzer-Division "Hohenstaufen" was not subordinated to the 6. SS-Panzerarmee. The sequential number "152" was assigned by the AKCR. The date might have been taken from Ernst-Günther Krätschmer.)	A man wearing a military uniform and coat, peaked cap and a neck order in the shape of a cross. His cap has an emblem in shape of a human skull and crossed bones.
Ernst Stäudle	SS-Oberscharführer	8./SS-Artillerie-Regiment 3	10 April 1942	—	—
Franz Staudegger	SS-Unterscharführer	13./SS-Panzer-Regiment 1	10 July 1943	—	—
Felix Steiner	SS-Oberscharführer	SS-Infanterie-Regiment (mot.)	15 August 1940	Awarded 159th Oak Leaves 23 December 1942; 86th Swords 10 August 1944	A man wearing a military uniform and neck order, in the shape of a cross. His hair is combed to the back.
Albert Stenwedel? (Note: No evidence of the award can be found in the German Federal Archives. Also no mentioned by the order commission of the Association of Knight's Cross Recipients (AKCR). According to von Seemen presumably awarded by general Maximilian de Angelis on the basis of the Dönitz-decree of 3 May 1945. Fellgiebel noted: No justification for the award. Albert Stenwedel was a member of the AKCR.)	SS-Sturmbannführer	II./Waffen-Gebirgsjäger-Regiment 27	3 May 1945	—	—
Arnold Stoffers	SS-Obersturmbannführer	SS-Freiwillige-Panzergrenadier-Regiment 23	12 March 1944	—	—
Stefan Strapatin	SS-Rottenführer	II./niederl. SS-Freiwillige-Panzergrenadier-Regiment 49	16 November 1944	—	—
Bruno Streckenbach	SS-Brigadeführer	19. Waffen-Grenadier-Division der SS (lett. Nr. 2)	27 August 1944	Awarded 701st Oak Leaves 16 January 1945	—
Josef Styr	SS-Hauptscharführer	1./SS-Panzergrenadier-Regiment 9	5 April 1945	—	—
Friedrich Suhr	SS-Obersturmbannführer	Kampfgruppe beim Befehlshaber der Sipo & SD Frankreich	11 December 1944	—	
Josef Swientek	SS-Obersturmbannführer	SS-Panzer-Artillerie-Regiment 3	16 June 1944	—	—
Lothar Swierzinski	SS-Rottenführer	10./SS-Panzergrenadier-Regiment 5	16 December 1943	Died of wounds 29 October 1944	—
Martin Tappe	SS-Obersturmbannführer	II./SS-Polizei-Panzergrenadier-Regiment 8	28 March 1945	—	—
Eberhard Telkamp	SS-Sturmbannführer	II./SS-Panzer-Regiment 9	23 August 1944	—	—
Ernst Tetsch	SS-Sturmbannführer	I./SS-Panzer-Regiment 10	28 March 1945	—	A man wearing a military uniform, peaked cap and a pair of binoculars around his neck. His cap has an emblem in shape of a human skull and crossed bones.
Johann Thaler	SS-Unterscharführer	6./SS-Panzer-Regiment 2	14 August 1943	Killed in action 7 April 1945	—
Alfred Titschkus	SS-Unterscharführer	3./SS-Panzer-Aufklärungs-Abteilung 3	11 December 1944	—	—
Paul Trabandt	SS-Hauptscharführer	2./SS-Panzerjäger-Abteilung 5	14 October 1943	—	—
Wilhelm Trabandt	SS-Standartenführer	1. SS-Infanterie-Brigade	6 January 1944	—	
Hans Traupe	SS-Sturmbannführer	I./SS-Polizei-Panzergrenadier-Regiment 3	23 February 1944	—	—
Christian Tychsen	SS-Sturmbannführer	II./SS-Panzer-Regiment 2	31 March 1943	Awarded 353rd Oak Leaves 10 December 1943	A man wearing a military uniform, peaked cap and a neck order in the shape of a cross. His cap has an emblem in shape of a human skull and crossed bones. A large scar on his chin is visible.
Karl Ullrich	SS-Sturmbannführer	Commander of SS-Pionier-Bataillon 3 "Totenkopf"	19 February 1942	Awarded 480th Oak Leaves 14 May 1944	—
Richard Utgenannt	SS-Hauptscharführer	Chief of the 3./SS-Sturmgeschütz-Abteilung 4	16 November 1944	—	—
Herbert-Ernst Vahl	SS-Oberführer	Leader of 2. SS-Panzergrenadier-Division "Das Reich"	31 March 1943	—	—
Anton Vandieken	SS-Hauptsturmführer of the Reserves	Leader of a Kampfgruppe in SS-Kavallerie-Regiment 15 (Note: According to Scherzer as chief of the 6./SS-Kavallerie-Regiment 15 and leader of a Kampfgruppe.)	26 December 1944	—	—
Eugéne Vaulôt	Waffen-Unterscharführer	Group leader in the 33. SS-Freiwilligen-Division "Charlemagne" (franz. Nr. 1) in the combat area Groß Berlin (greater Berlin)	29 April 1945	—	—
Voldemārs Veiss	Waffen-Standartenführer	Commander of lett. SS-Freiwilligen-Grenadier-Regiment 48 (Note: According to Scherzer as commander of SS-Freiwilligen-Grenadier-Regiment 42 (lett. Nr. 4).)	9 February 1944	Died of wounds 17 April 1944	
Johann Veith	SS-Obersturmführer	Leader of the 3./SS-Panzer-Regiment 2 "Das Reich"	14 February 1945*	Killed in action 7 January 1945	—
Fritz Vogt	SS-Obersturmführer	Zugführer (platoon leader) in the 2./SS-Aufklärungs-Abteilung of the SS-Verfügungs-Division	4 September 1940	Awarded 785th Oak Leaves 16 March 1945; Killed in action 3 April 1945	—
Jürgen Wagner	SS-Oberführer	Commander of SS-Panzergrenadier-Regiment 9 "Germania" (Note: According to Scherzer as commander of SS-Panzergrenadier-Regiment "Germania".)	24 July 1943	Awarded 680th Oak Leaves 11 December 1944	
Kurt Wahl	SS-Hauptsturmführer	Leader of a Kampfgruppe in SS-Panzergrenadier-Regiment 38 "Götz von Berlichingen" (Note: According to Scherzer as adjutant in SS-Panzergreadier-Regiment 38 and leader of a Kampfgruppe.)	23 August 1944	Awarded 720th Oak Leaves 1 February 1945	—
Bruno Walden	Major of the Schupo	Commander of the III./SS-Polizei-Regiment 2	18 January 1945	—	—
Hans Waldmüller	SS-Sturmbannführer	Commander of the I./SS-Panzergrenadier-Regiment 25 "Hitlerjugend" (Note: According to Scherzer as commander of the I./SS-Panzergrenadier-Regiment 25.)	27 August 1944	—	—
Günter Wanhöfer	SS-Hauptsturmführer (Note: According to Scherzer as SS-Hauptsturmführer of the Reserves and commander of SS-Pionier-Bataillon 54.)	Commander of SS-Pionier-Bataillon 54 "Nederland"	27 August 1944	—	—
Alois Weber	SS-Hauptscharführer	Zugführer (platoon leader) in the 16.(Pi)/SS-Panzergrenadier-Regiment "Deutschland" (Note: According to Scherzer as Zugführer (platoon leader) in the 16./SS-Panzergrenadier-Regiment "Deutschland".)	30 July 1943	—	—
Wilhelm Weber	SS-Obersturmführer	Leader of the divisions combat school of the 33. (französisch) SS-Freiwilligen-Grenadier-Division "Charlemagne" (Note: According to Scherzer as leader of the divisions combat school/33. Waffen-Grenadier-Division der SS "Charlemagne" (französische Nr. 1).)	29 April 1945	—	—
Otto Weidinger	SS-Sturmbannführer	Commander of SS-Panzer-Aufklärungs-Abteilung 2 "Das Reich" (Note: According to Scherzer as commander of SS-Panzer-Aufklärungs-Abteilung 2.)	21 April 1944	Awarded 688th Oak Leaves 26 December 1944 (150th) Swords 6 May 1945? (Note: No evidence of the award can be found in the German Federal Archives. The award was unlawfully presented by SS-Oberstgruppenführer Sepp Dietrich. The date is taken from the announcement made by the 6. SS-Panzerarmee. The sequential number "150" was assigned by the Association of Knight's Cross Recipients (AKCR). Weidinger was member of the AKCR.)	A man wearing a military uniform, peaked cap and a neck order in the shape of a cross. His cap has an emblem in shape of a human skull and crossed bones.
Herman Weiser	SS-Obersturmführer of the Reserves	Leader of the 2.(Aufklärungs-Abteilung)/"Leibstandarte SS Adolf Hitler" (Note: According to Scherzer as leader of the 2./SS-Aufklärungs-Abteilung "Leibstandarte SS Adolf Hitler".)	28 March 1943	—	—
Hans Weiß	SS-Hauptsturmführer	Commander of SS-Panzer-Aufklärungs-Abteilung 2 "Das Reich" (Note: According to Scherzer as commander of SS-Panzer-Aufklärungs-Abteilung 2.)	6 April 1943	—	A smiling man wearing a military uniform, peaked cap with skull emblem and neck order in the shape of a cross.
Helmut Wendorff	SS-Untersturmführer	Zugführer (platoon leader) in the 13.(schwere)/SS-Panzer-Regiment 1 "Leibstandarte SS Adolf Hitler" (Note: According to Scherzer as Zugführer (platoon leader) in the 13.(schwere)/SS-Panzer-Regiment 1.)	12 February 1944	Killed in action 6 August 1944	—
Gustáv Wendrinský	SS-Oberscharführer	Zugführer (platoon leader) in the 1./SS-Panzer-Jäger-Abteilung 8 "Florian Geyer" (Note: According to Scherzer as Zugführer (platoon leader) in the 1./SS-Panzer-Jäger-Abteilung 8.)	27 January 1945	—	—
Heinz Werner	SS-Hauptsturmführer	Leader of the III.(gepanzert)/SS-Panzergrenadier-Regiment 4 "Der Führer" (Note: According to Scherzer as leader of the III./SS-Panzergrenadier-Regiment 4 "Der Führer".)	23 August 1944	Awarded (864th) Oak Leaves 6 May 1945 (Note: No evidence of the award can be found in the German Federal Archives. The award was unlawfully presented by SS-Oberstgruppenführer Sepp Dietrich. The date is taken from the announcement made by the 6. SS-Panzerarmee. The sequential number "864" was assigned by the Association of Knight's Cross Recipients (AKCR). Werner was a member of the AKCR.)	—
Emil Wiesemann	SS-Hauptsturmführer of the Reserves	Chief of the 2./SS-Sturmgeschütz-Abteilung 1 "Leibstandarte SS Adolf Hitler" (Note: According to Scherzer as chief of the 2./SS-Sturmgeschütz-Abteilung 1.)	20 December 1943*	Killed in action 14 November 1943	—
Philipp Wild	SS-Oberscharführer	Panzer commander in the 1./SS-Panzer-Abteilung 11	21 March 1944	—	—
Theodor Wisch	SS-Sturmbannführer	Commander of the II./"Leibstandarte SS Adolf Hitler"	15 September 1941	Awarded 393rd Oak Leaves 12 February 1944; 94th Swords 30 August 1944	—
Günther-Eberhardt Wisliceny	SS-Sturmbannführer	Commander of the III./SS-Panzergrenadier-Regiment "Deutschland"	30 July 1943	Awarded 687th Oak Leaves 26 December 1944 (151st) Swords 6 May 1945? (Note: No evidence of the award can be found in the German Federal Archives. The award was unlawfully presented by SS-Oberstgruppenführer Sepp Dietrich. The date is taken from the announcement made by the 6. SS-Panzerarmee. The sequential number "151" was assigned by the Association of Knight's Cross Recipients (AKCR). Wisliceny was member of the AKCR.)	A man in semi profile wearing a military uniform. His hair is combed back and his facial expression is determined.
Fritz Witt	SS-Sturmbannführer	Commander of the I./SS-Infanterie-Regiment "Deutschland" (Note: According to Scherzer as commander of the I./SS-Standarte "Deutschland".)	4 September 1940	Awarded 200th Oak Leaves 1 March 1943; Killed in action 14 June 1944	
Michael Wittmann	SS-Untersturmführer (Note: According to Scherzer as SS-Untersturmführer of the Reserves and Zugführer (platoon leader) in the 13.(schwere)/SS-Panzer-Regiment 1.)	Zugführer (platoon leader) in the 13.(schwere)/SS-Panzer-Regiment 1 "Leibstandarte SS Adolf Hitler"	14 January 1944	Awarded 380th Oak Leaves 30 January 1944; 71st Swords 22 June 1944; Killed in action 8 August 1944	A man wearing a black military uniform, peaked cap and a neck order in the shape of a cross. His cap has an emblem in shape of a human skull and crossed bones.
Werner Wolff	SS-Untersturmführer	Adjutant of the III.(gepanzert)/SS-Panzergrenadier-Regiment "Leibstandarte SS Adolf Hitler" (Note: According to Scherzer as adjutant of the III./2. SS-Panzergrenadier-Regiment "Leibstandarte SS Adolf Hitler".)	7 August 1943	Died of wounds 29 March 1945	A man wearing a military uniform and a neck order in the shape of a cross.
Balthasar Woll	SS-Rottenführer	Richtschütze (gunner) in the 13.(schwere)/SS-Panzer-Regiment 1 "Leibstandarte SS Adolf Hitler" (Note: According to Scherzer as Richtschütze (gunner) in the 13.(schwere)/SS-Panzer-Regiment 1.)	16 January 1944	—	—
Karl-Heinz Worthmann	SS-Hauptscharführer	Zugführer (platoon leader) in the 6./SS-Panzer-Regiment 2 "Das Reich" (Note: According to Scherzer as Zugführer (platoon leader) in the 6./SS-Panzer-Regiment 2.)	31 March 1943	Killed in action 7 July 1943	A man wearing a military uniform and a neck order in the shape of a cross.
Alfred Bernhard Julius Ernst Wünnenberg	SS-Standartenführer and Oberst of the Schupo	Commander of SS-Polizei-Schützen-Regiment 3	15 November 1941	Awarded 91st Oak Leaves 23 April 1942	A man wearing a military uniform and a neck order in the shape of a cross.
Max Wünsche	SS-Sturmbannführer	Commander of the I./SS-Panzer-Regiment 1 "Leibstandarte SS Adolf Hitler" (Note: According to Scherzer as commander of the I./SS-Panzer-Regiment 1.)	28 February 1943	Awarded 548th Oak Leaves 11 August 1944	
Erich Wulff? (Note: The nomination by the troop is not documented. A file card indicates that it was received on 23 February 1945. SS-Obersturmbannführer Kment noted that he did return the Heinrich Himmler approved nomination on 29 April 1945 to the HPA/P5a (Army personnel office). Three copies for further processing were retained by the HPA but were left unfinished by the end of the war. Missing is the confirmation of the commander-in-chief of the 9. Armee and Army Group Vistula. The nomination did not receive a sequential number. The book "awarded Knight Crosses" does not list Erich Wulff. The nomination remained unfinished by the end of the war. The file card also contains a note "unfinished". A further file card can be found in the record for rejected or unfinished nominations. Mr Meentz of the German Federal Archive stated on 20 July 2004 that it cannot be verified that Wulff received the Knight's Cross.)	SS-Sturmbannführer	Ia (operations officer) in the 15. Waffen-Grenadier-Division of the SS	9 May 1945*	Killed in action 3 February 1945	—
August Zehender	SS-Obersturmbannführer	Commander of the SS-Kavallerie-Regiment 1 "Florian Geyer" (Note: According to Scherzer as commander of the SS-Kavallerie-Regiment 2.)	10 March 1943	Awarded 722nd Oak Leaves 1 February 1945; Killed in action 11 February 1945	A man wearing a military uniform, peaked cap and a neck order in the shape of a cross. His cap has an emblem in shape of a human skull and crossed bones.
Erich Zepper	SS-Hauptscharführer	Deputy leader of the 2./SS-Panzergrenadier-Regiment 10 "Westland" (Note: According to Scherzer as leader of the 2./SS-Panzergrenadier-Regiment 10 "Westland".)	2 December 1943	—	—
Joachim Ziegler	SS-Brigadeführer and Generalmajor of the Waffen-SS	Commander of the 11. SS-Freiwilligen Panzergrenadier Division "Nordland"	5 September 1944	Awarded (848th) Oak Leaves 28 April 1945; Killed in action 2 May 1945	—
August Zingel	SS-Unterscharführer	Shock troops leader in the Kampfgruppe "Krauth" n the 15./Totenkopf-Infanterie-Regiment 1	4 October 1942	—	—
