= Rudolf Seitz =

Rudolf Seitz may refer to:

- Rudolf von Seitz (1842-1920), German painter, illustrator, and designer.
- Rudolf Seitz (1919–1994), German Knight's Cross of the Iron Cross recipient (of the Waffen-SS)
- Rudolf Seitz (art teacher) (1934–2001), German art teacher
