= Desiderius Hampel =

Austrian SS member

- Born: 20 January 1895; Sisak, Kingdom of Croatia-Slavonia, Austria-Hungary (now Sisak, Sisak-Moslavina County, Croatia)
- Died: 11 January 1981 (aged 85); Graz, Styria, Austria
- Military career
- Allegiance: World War I Austro-Hungarian Empire; World War II; Kingdom of Hungary; Independent State of Croatia; Nazi Germany
- Branch: Waffen-SS
- Service years: 1914–1918 Austro-Hungarian Army; 1937–1941 Royal Hungarian Army; 1941–1942 Croatian Home Guard (NDH); 1942–1945 Waffen-SS
- Rank: World War I Oberleutnant; World War II; SS-Brigadeführer und Generalmajor der Waffen-SS
- Units: 16th Hungarian Infantry Regiment; 13th Waffen Mountain Division of the SS Handschar (1st Croatian)
- Commands: 13th Waffen Mountain Division of the SS Handschar (1st Croatian) 1944–1945
- Conflicts: World War I World War II
- Awards: World War I Iron Cross II class Wound Badge in Black; Military Merit Cross (Austria–Hungary) with War Decoration and Swords; Military Merit Medal (Austria–Hungary) in Silver; Honorary Medal for bravery (Austria); World War II; Knight's Cross of the Iron Cross; Iron Cross I Class; Iron Cross II Class; Wound Badge in Silver; War Merit Cross with Swords

Desiderius Hampel (20 January 1895 – 11 January 1981) was a SS-Brigadeführer und Generalmajor der Waffen-SS during World War II who commanded the 13th Waffen Mountain Division of the SS Handschar (1st Croatian) and was possibly awarded the Knight's Cross of the Iron Cross (Ritterkreuz), the highest award in the military and paramilitary forces of Nazi Germany during World War II. After the war the Yugoslavian government asked for his extradition to charge him with war crimes, but he managed to escape from a British internment camp.

== Early life ==
Desiderius Hampel was born 20 January 1895 in the town of Sisak, Austria-Hungary (modern-day Croatia), to Volksdeutsche (ethnic German) parents. His father was an inspector on the Imperial-Royal Austrian State Railways, and the family often had to move around the Austro-Hungarian Empire. This had the benefit of teaching the young Hampel a number of languages. After he completed his primary school education, he was sent to a military school in Karlovac. After graduation he joined the army in October 1914, as a warrant officer in the 16th Hungarian Infantry Regiment Freiherr von Giesl, and in December was sent to the front line.

== World War I ==
In April 1915, he was given command of a platoon and shortly after promoted to Leutnant and given command of the 14th Company. At the end of the year he was sent on a heavy machine gun training course at Bruck an der Leitha. When he returned to the front in November he was given command of the 4th Company of his regiment and was promoted to Oberleutnant in May 1917. In September 1918, he was appointed as the second in command of the 36th Battalion fighting in Serbia until the end of the war when he became a prisoner of war in Serbia. He escaped from captivity just over a year later and made his way to Vienna and then Budapest.

== Between the wars ==
After he returned from captivity he started work on a farm and studied forestry between 1925 and 1928 at the Ludwig-Maximilians-Universität München (LMU) in Munich. He then worked in the forestry industry until December 1937 when he rejoined the Royal Hungarian Army and served in Budapest.

== World War II ==
Hampel served in Budapest until March 1941, and was then sent to the town of Csepel, in command of the area defences until December 1941 when he was dismissed from the army. He then joined the Croatian Home Guard with the rank of major and was appointed as the intelligence officer for the IV Army Corps. In May 1942, after a request from SS-Gruppenführer und Generalleutnant der Waffen-SS Artur Phleps he joined the Waffen-SS as a SS-Sturmbannführer (major).

At the formation of the 7th SS Volunteer Mountain Division Prinz Eugen, he was given command of the III Battalion, 1st SS Gebirgsjäger Regiment, which included the 13th to 18th Companies. In October 1942 he led a kampfgruppe during the division's first major operation, Operation Kopaonik, which unsuccessfully targeted Chetnik groups in the Kopaonik mountains of central Serbia. He remained in this position until June 1943 when he was moved to command the Training and Reserve Battalion. Next he was given a position on the staff of the newly formed 13th Waffen Mountain Division of the SS Handschar (1st Croatian). On 28 September 1943, he was given command of the 27th SS Mountain Infantry Regiment of the 13th SS Division, and on 9 November 1943 he was promoted to SS-Obersturmbannführer (lieutenant colonel). In this role, he commanded the regiment during its final training at the Neuhammer training grounds in the Silesian region of Germany (present-day Poland), then when it deployed to the Independent State of Croatia in early 1944. The division participated in what may have been the largest anti-Partisan sweep of World War II: Operation Maibaum. The 13th SS Division also participated in other divisional and corps-sized anti-Partisan operations between March and May 1944.

On 2 April 1944, he was promoted to SS-Standartenführer (colonel), and after the disastrous Operation Vollmond, he was given command of the 13th SS Division on 19 June. He was promoted to SS-Oberführer on 9 November 1944, and on 30 January 1945 he was promoted to SS-Brigadeführer and Generalmajor der Waffen-SS. He was reportedly awarded the Knight's Cross of the Iron Cross for his command of the division near the end of the war in May 1945. (Note: No evidence of the award can be found in the German Federal Archives. Presumably Desiderius Hampel received the Knight's Cross the same day as Karl Liecke and Hans Hanke. Letter from Ernst-Günther Krätschmer to Von Seemen dated 7 August 1980. According to Von Seemen presumably presented by General Maximilian de Angelis. The Order Commission of the Association of Knight's Cross Recipients (AKCR) processed Hampel's case in 1980 and Fellgiebel decided: Knight's Cross yes, 3 May 1945. In his book he noted: "A justification for the presentation was not given". Hampel was member of the AKCR.) Hampel was slated for extradition to Yugoslavia to face war crime charges, but fled from a British prisoner-of-war camp in Fallingbostel.

== Post war ==
Hampel survived the war and died on 11 January 1981 in Graz, Austria.

== See also ==
- List SS-Brigadeführer
