= Hans Hanke =

SS-Obersturmbannführer Hans Hanke
- Hanke as a Hauptsturmführer
- Born: 13 March 1912; Gleiwitz, Silesia, German Empire
- Died: 13 August 1981 (aged 69); Goslar, West Germany
- Military career
- Allegiance: Nazi Germany
- Branch: Waffen SS
- Service years: 1935–1945
- Rank: Obersturmbannführer
- Unit: 13th Waffen Mountain Division of the SS Handschar (1st Croatian)
- Conflicts: World War II
- Awards: Knight's Cross of the Iron Cross; German Cross in Gold

Johannes Reinhold Hanke (13 March 1912 – 13 August 1981) was an SS-Obersturmbannführer (lieutenant colonel) in the Waffen SS during World War II. He possibly received the Knight's Cross of the Iron Cross (Ritterkreuz), the highest award in the military and paramilitary forces of Nazi Germany during World War II.

== Early life ==
Hans Hanke was born on 13 March 1912 in Gleiwitz, Silesia, and had at one time been a theology student. He joined the Allgemeine SS in 1933 and the Waffen SS in 1935.

== World War II ==
Hanke served during the Polish Campaign and then in the subsequent campaigns in France, the Netherlands, Belgium, the Balkans, the USSR, Croatia, and South West Hungary. He was awarded his first combat decoration during the Battle of France in June 1940.

=== Service with SS Handschar ===
==== Training ====
Hanke joined the staff of the 13th Waffen Mountain Division of the SS Handschar (1st Croatian) as a SS-Hauptsturmführer (captain) in May 1943 and commanded the all-German divisional signals battalion during its formation and training. He was generally well-liked by his soldiers who considered him approachable but demanding in terms of combat readiness and unit discipline. The battalion conducted its initial training at a SS training facility in Goslar, Germany.

In July 1943, the division concentrated in southern France for further training, and the signals battalion was garrisoned in Mende with divisional headquarters. In September 1943, while the division was still training in southern France, a mutiny occurred in the divisional pioneer battalion garrisoned at Villefranche-de-Rouergue. Immediately following the mutiny, the divisional commander declared martial law in the city and Hanke was appointed city commandant. In November 1943 he was promoted to SS-Sturmbannführer.

==== Battalion and Regimental command in Bosnia ====
In March 1944, just as the division was returning to north-east Bosnia, Hanke was appointed as the commander of the 2nd battalion of the 28th Regiment of the division (II/28). During Operation Save in mid-March 1944 he led II/28 as it stormed Partisan positions at Čelić, and in October 1944 his actions during this assault were included in a recommendation for an award of the German Cross in Gold.

Three months later he was appointed to command the 28th Regiment and in late June, in response to a Partisan incursion into the division's 'security zone', he forced marched his old battalion, II/28 from Vlasenica to Šekovići where they drove off a Partisan attack then counterattacked and pushed the Partisans south. His leadership in this action was also included in the recommendation for an award of the German Cross in Gold.

In August 1944, Hanke commanded elements of the 28th Regiment that scattered the Partisan 11th Border Division west of Vlasenica and then engaged in an 18-hour battle with Partisan forces holding Debelo Brdo near Šekovići which killed 121 Partisans for the loss of 18 men. These actions were also included in his recommendation for the German Cross in Gold.

==== Kampfgruppe Hanke ====
In October 1944, due to widespread desertions, about 70% of the Bosnian Muslims of the division were disarmed and transferred elsewhere. The desertions were partly due to the constant fighting the division had been doing since March 1944, and also due to the move of much of the division from the 'security zone' in north-east Bosnia to Zagreb. Due to advances by the Soviet Red Army and its creation of two bridgeheads over the Danube, elements of the seriously under-strength division were sent to Batina to assist in throwing the Soviets back across the Danube.

A task force, known as Kampfgruppe Hanke, was formed under Hanke's command. The task force consisted of three infantry battalions, one battalion of the divisional artillery regiment and elements of the divisional pioneer battalion. The task force arrived in Beli Manastir by rail on 14 November 1944, and were deployed in the blockade position near Zmajevać. Hanke set up his headquarters in Kneževi Vinogradi. The divisional reconnaissance battalion, which had been thrown into the fighting a month earlier, joined the task force, but even with these reinforcements the length of the front line was too long for more than a series of company-strength strong points. Until 20 November, when the Soviets placed pontoon bridges across the Danube and sent three divisions across at Batina, the task force was engaged in a continuous and bitter defensive fighting which caused heavy losses.

On the night of 21 November, the fresh Soviet 113th Rifle Division crossed the Danube and in the next 48 hours rolled straight over the top of Kampfgruppe Hanke which was driven back to Kneževi Vinogradi with only 200 of the original 1200 men remaining. The task force was placed under the command of the Reichsgrenadier Division Hoch und Deutschmeister and withdrew from the blocking position on 26 November and took up positions in Siklós, Hungary. The task force was soon withdrawn from the line and sent to Barcs to be re-united with the rest of the division.

==== Retreat to Austria and surrender ====
Hanke remained as commander of the 28th Regiment until the end of the war, being promoted to SS-Obersturmbannfuhrer in January 1945. The division withdrew in stages to the Reich border, with Hanke's regiment fighting its last battle at Kiesmanndorff on 19 April, and their sector of the Reich Defence Line remained quiet until the capitulation on 6 May. The division then spent the period 8–12 May marching west towards Anglo-American forces in the hope of surrendering to them rather than the Soviets. Most of the division surrendered to the British.

Hanke survived the war, and was a prisoner of war with the US Armed Forces in Nurnberg-Langwasser.

=== Awards ===
Hanke was awarded the Iron Cross (Second Class) in June 1940 and the Iron Cross (First Class) in July 1941. He was also awarded the Croatian Iron Trefoil (Second Class). He was awarded the German Cross in Gold on 28 February 1945 as a SS-Sturmbannführer in the 28th Regiment of the 13th SS Division. Just prior to the end of World War II in Europe he may also have been awarded the Knight's Cross of the Iron Cross. (Note: No evidence of the award can be found in the German Federal Archives. Hans Hanke, according to Ernst-Günther Krätschmer, was informed of the award by SS-Brigadeführer Desiderius Hampel and SS-Obersturmbannführer Karl Liecke. Both Hampel and Liecke supposedly received the Knight's Cross the same day—Letter from Krätschmer to Von Seemen dated 7 August 1980. Mr Meentz of the German Federal Archives stated on 20 July 2004 that it cannot be verified that Hanke received the Knight's Cross. According to Von Seemen the Knight's Cross was awarded by General Maximilian de Angelis. The order commission of the Association of Knight's Cross Recipients (AKCR) processed the case in 1980 and Fellgiebel decided: "Knight's Cross yes, 3 May 1945". Nevertheless Fellgiebel noted: No justification for the award.)

== Postwar life ==
From 1955 Hanke was employed by the Kurt Jacques Company, Rheinhausen, of which he eventually became manager/director. In the late 1960s, he worked as a project engineer at the construction of Ashuganj Power Station in Bangladesh (formerly East Pakistan). He died in Goslar on 13 August 1981.
