= Ernst-Günther Krätschmer =

- Born: 2 July 1920
- Died: 26 May 1984 (aged 63); Munich, West Germany
- Relatives: HIAG
- Military career
- Allegiance: Nazi Germany
- Branch: Waffen-SS
- Service years: 1937–45
- Rank: Untersturmführer
- Units: Totenkopf Standarte "Oberbayern", SS Division Totenkopf
- Conflicts: World War II

Ernst-Günther Krätschmer (July 2, 1920 – May 26, 1984) was a German SS-officer. After World War II he took part in efforts to shape a positive image of the Waffen-SS in popular culture. He published about the Knight's Cross recipients of the Waffen-SS, contributed to the publications of the HIAG, the revisionist veterans' organisation of the Waffen-SS, and organized support for Walter Reder, who was being imprisoned in Italy for war crimes.

== SS career ==
Krätschmer joined the SS in 1937 (SS-Nr. 324.367) and served as a guard at Dachau concentration camp with the Totenkopf Standarte "Oberbayern". During World War II he saw action with the 3rd SS Panzer Division Totenkopf during the Battle of France and in the Soviet Union. In 1942 he attended the SS-Junker School at Bad Tölz, but failed his exams. At the end of the war he nonetheless became an SS-Führer. According to historian Jens Westemeier, Krätschmer reached the rank of Untersturmführer. Westemeier also noted that Krätschmer declared himself to be a recipient of the German Cross in gold after the war.

== Post-war activities ==
In 1955 Krätschmer published the book Rtterkreuzträger der Waffen-SS. Featuring a foreword by Paul Hausser, formerly one of the highest ranking commanders of the Waffen-SS, Krätschmer's work was one of the earliest attempts to shape a positive image of the Waffen-SS after the war. Historians note that Krätschmer uncritically presented perpetrators like Erich von dem Bach-Zelewski, Oskar Dirlewanger, Theodor Eicke, Curt von Gottberg and Bruno Streckenbach as honest soldiers and claimed that war criminals like Walter Reder, Fritz Knöchlein, Bernhard Siebken and Jochen Peiper were victims of victor's justice. On persons who had been actively and decisively involved in the planning and execution of the Nazi policy of extermination, like Friedrich Jeckeln, Friedrich-Wilhelm Krüger, Streckenbach and Dirlewanger, only basic biographical data were given. Jens Westemeier points to erroneous claims by Krätschmer about Jochen Peiper's career, by which Peiper's involvement with Heinrich Himmler was minimized, and to Krätschmer's denial of war crimes.

The book was first published by Plesse, a publisher with close ties to the HIAG. Later editions were published by Waldemar Schütz, a veteran of the Waffen-SS himself and an active member of the HIAG and of the extreme right wing parties Deutsche Reichspartei and Nationaldemokratische Partei Deutschlands. Further editions were released by the Nation Europa-Verlag, who had taken over Schütz's publishing house in 1992, and Pour le Mérite, an imprint of publisher Dietmar Munier, who had bought Nation Europa in 2009.

Krätschmer was active with the HIAG as well and became a regular contributor to the HIAG-magazine Der Freiwillige. In 1957 he and five other former SS-men launched the so-called "Gaeta-Hilfe" (Gaeta Help) to campaign for the release of Walter Reder who in 1951 had been sentenced to life imprisonment for the Marzabotto massacre and was imprisoned in the fortress prison of Gaeta, north of Naples.

== Publications ==
- Die Ritterkreuzträger der Waffen-SS. Plesse-Verl., Göttingen 1955.
  - 3rd ed., K. W. Schütz, Preussisch Oldendorf 1982.
  - 4th ed., Nation Europa Verl., Coburg 1999.
  - 6th ed., Ed. Zeitgeschichte, Selent 2012.
- Heinz Roth und Ernst-Günther Krätschmer: Le procès de Malmédy suivi de la déclaration de Jochen Peiper (Landsberg, 1948). Et de la biographie de J. Peiper. Éditions du Baucens, Braine-le-Comte 1976.
