= Albert Frey =

Albert Frey may refer to:

- Albert Frey (architect) (1903–1998), American architect
- Albert Frey (SS officer) (1913–2003), commander 1st SS Panzer Grenadier Regiment
- Albert Frey-Wyssling (1900–1988), Swiss botanist
- Albert Frey (musician) (born 1964), German Christian musician
