= Leibstandarte SS Adolf Hitler order of battle =

The Leibstandarte SS Adolf Hitler (LSSAH) was founded in September 1933 as Adolf Hitler's personal bodyguard formation. It was given the title Leibstandarte Adolf Hitler (LAH) in November, 1933. On 13 April 1934, by order of Himmler, the regiment became known as the Leibstandarte SS Adolf Hitler (LSSAH). In 1939 the LSSAH became a separate unit of the Waffen-SS aside the SS-TV and the SS-VT.

The LSSAH independently participated in combat during the Invasion of Poland (1939). Elements of the LSSAH later joined the SS-VT prior to Operation Barbarossa in 1941 and by the end of World War II they had been increased in size from a Regiment to a Panzer Division.

== SS-Stabswache Berlin February 1933 ==
117 Men under Sepp Dietrich

== Leibstandarte Adolf Hitler November 1933 - September 1939 ==
- 1st Battalion
  - 1st Company
  - 2nd Company
  - ?
- 2nd Battalion
  - 1st Company
  - 2nd Company
  - ?

== Infantry Regiment Leibstandarte SS Adolf Hitler September 1939 ==
- Regimental Headquarters (Josef Dietrich)
- 1st Infantry Battalion
  - 1st Company
  - 2nd Company
  - 3rd Company
  - 4th (MG) Company
- 2nd Infantry Battalion
  - 5th Company
  - 6th Company
  - 7th Company
  - 8th (MG) Company
- 3rd Infantry Battalion
  - 9th Company
  - 10th Company
  - 11th Company
  - 12th (MG) Company
- Panzerabwehrkanone Company (Kurt Meyer)
- Reconnaissance Company
- Motor Cycle Company
- Engineer Company
- Signals Company
- Artillery Battalion
- 4th Wach Battalion (Ceremonial and Guard Duties)

== Infantry Regiment (mot) Leibstandarte SS Adolf Hitler—April 1941 ==
(Brigade size formation)

- Regimental Headquarters Staff (Josef Dietrich)
- 1st SS Infantry Battalion (mot): (Fritz Witt)
- 2nd SS Infantry Battalion (mot): (Theodor Wisch)
- 3rd SS Infantry Battalion (mot): (SS-Sturmbannführer Wilhelm Weidenhaupt)
- 4th SS Infantry Battalion (mot): (SS-Sturmbannführer Jahnke)
- 5th SS Infantry Battalion (mot): (SS-Sturmbannführer Van Bibber)
- SS Heavy Infantry Battalion (mot) LSSAH: (SS-Sturmbannführer Steineck)
- SS Anti-aircraft Battalion 1 LSSAH: (Bernhard Krause)
- SS Assault gun (Sturmgeschütz) Battalion 1LSSAH: (Georg Schönberger)
- SS Engineer Battalion 1 LSSAH (Christian Hansen)
- SS Reconnaissance Battalion 1 LSSAH: (Kurt Meyer)

== 1st SS Panzer Division Leibstandarte SS Adolf Hitler - Normandy 1944 ==
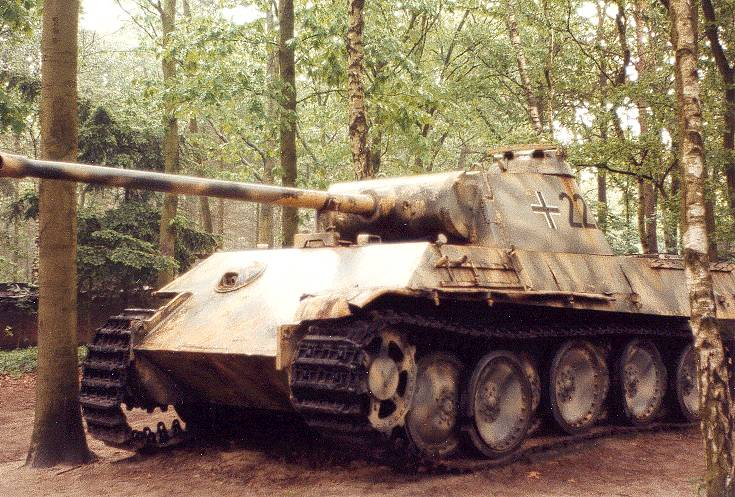
Panther tank as used by I /1st SS Panzer Battalion, LSSAH

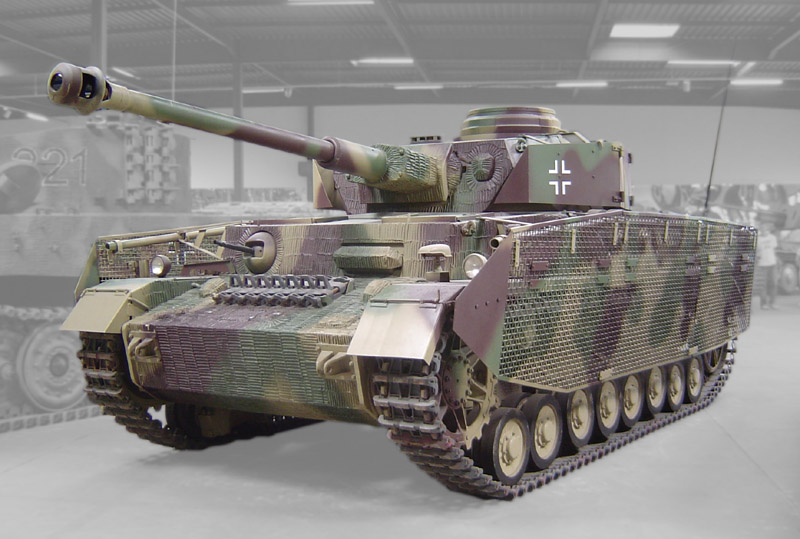
Panzer IV as used by II /1st SS Panzer Battalion, LSSAH

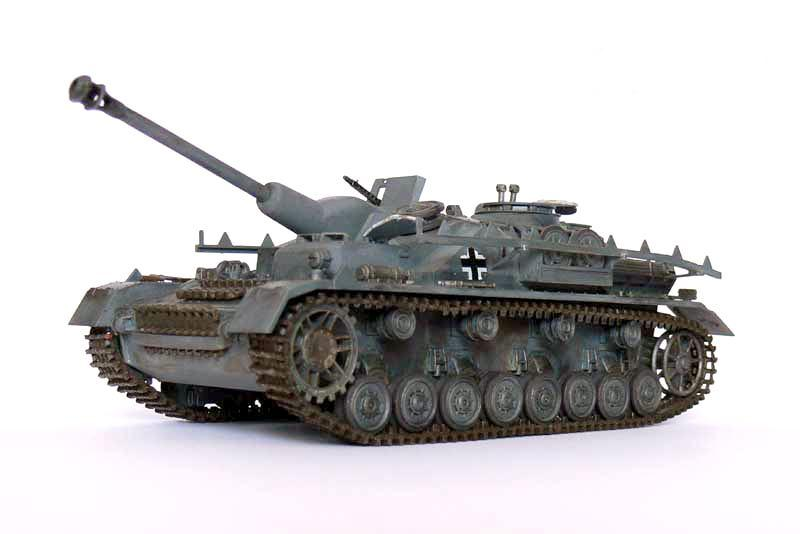
Sturmgesschutz (Assault gun) as used by 1st SS Assault Gun Battalion, LSSAH

- Divisional Headquarters Staff (Theodor Wisch)
- 1st SS Panzer Regiment (Joachim Peiper)
  - I/1st Panzer Battalion (67x Panthers)
  - II/1st Panzer Battalion (103x Panzer IVs)
- 1st SS Panzergrenadier Regiment (Albert Frey)
  - I/1st SS Panzergrenadier Battalion
  - II/1st SS Panzergrenadier Battalion
  - III/1st SS Panzergrenadier Battalion
- 2nd SS Panzergrenadier Regiment (Rudolf Sandig)
  - I/2nd SS Panzergrenadier Battalion
  - II/2nd SS Panzergrenadier Battalion
  - III/2nd SS Panzergrenadier Battalion
- 1st SS Panzer Reconnaissance Battalion (Gustav Knittel)
- 1st SS Sturmgeschütz Battalion (45x Sturmgeschütz III)(Heinrich Heimann)
- 1st SS Artillery Regiment (Franz Steineck)
  - 1st SS Artillery Battalion (2x 105mm Wespe Bty ,1x 150mm Hummel Bty)
  - 2nd SS Artillery Battalion (2x 105mm Bty [towed])
  - 3rd SS Artillery Battalion (2x 150mm Bty [towed], 1x 100mm Kanon Bty [towed])
- 1st SS Werfer Regiment (Klaus Besch) (3x 150mm Bty [towed])
- 1st SS Anti Aircraft Battalion (Hugo Ullerich) (3x 88 mm guns, 2x 37 mm guns)
- 1st SS Panzer Pioneer Battalion (Gerd Steinert)
- 1st SS Panzer Signal Battalion (Eugene Metz)
- 1st SS Medical Battalion (Dr Liebrich)
- 1st SS Admin Battalion (Obersturmbannführer Paul Tauber)
- 1st SS Repair Battalion (Alfred Gilles)
- 1st SS Supply Battalion (Klaus Stamp)

Note: a SS Panzer Regiment had two Panzer Battalions and a SS Panzer Grenadier Regiment had three Pz-Gren Battalions.

== See also ==
- Schutzstaffel
