= Kopfermann =

Kopfermann is a surname. Notable people with the surname include:

- Albert Kopfermann (1846–1914), German musicologist and librarian
- Arne Kopfermann (born 1967), German musician and author
- Hans Kopfermann (1895–1963), German atomic and nuclear physicist
