= Arne Kopfermann =

German musician

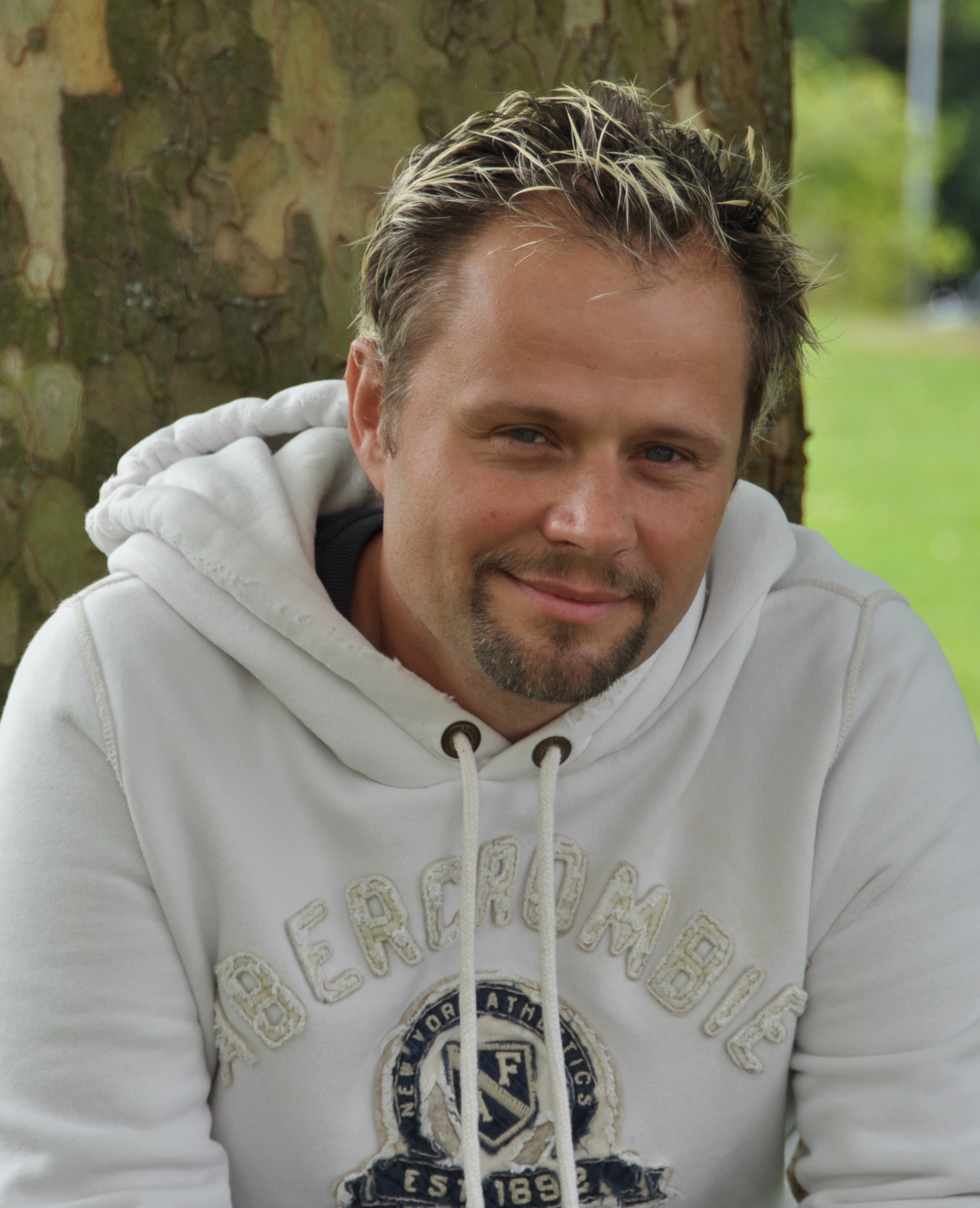
Arne Kopfermann

Arne Kopfermann (born August 1, 1967, in Erlangen) is a German Christian songwriter, musician, music producer, and non-fiction author.

== Life ==
Kopfermann grew up in Hamburg as the son of the pastor Wolfram Kopfermann. He studied sociology with a focus on media in Hamburg and Frankfurt as well as theology at the University of the Nations in Kona/Hawaii and at the Anskar-Kolleg in Hamburg. He also studied popular music at the University of Music and Theater in Hamburg.

For many years Kopfermann was the musical director of the community music work at the Anskar Church in Hamburg. He composed more than 600 songs, wrote them with and for Daniel Kallauch, Ijakka, Sharona, Albert Frey, Daniel Harter, Sammy Jersak, Sefora Nelson, Anja Lehmann, Samuel Harfst, Winnie Schweitzer and Wayne Morris and published various national project CDs.

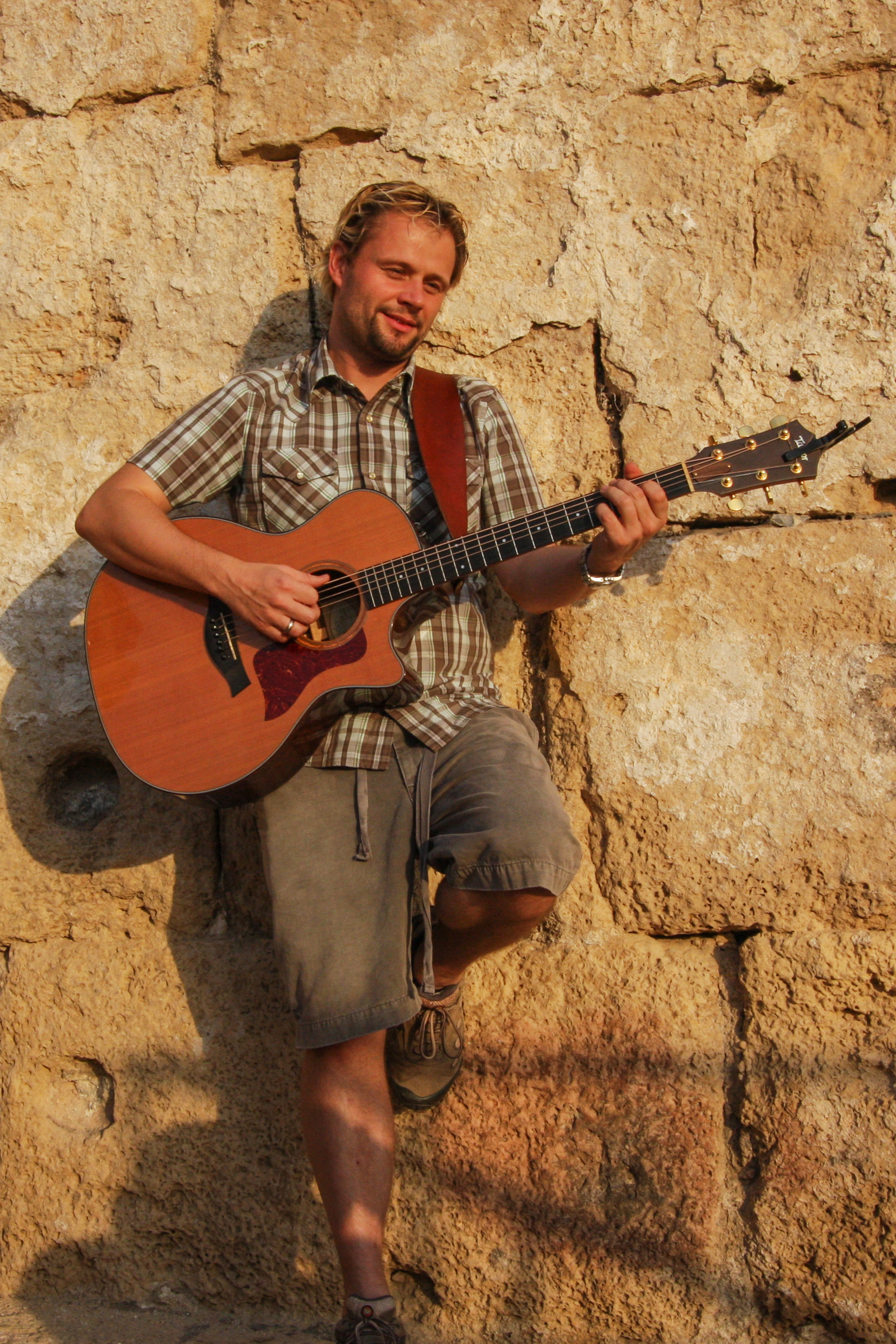
Arne Kopfermann 2008 in Israel

From 1999 to 2002 he was head of the Christian music label Projektion J Music House in Aßlar, and from 2002 to 2010 he was responsible for the Pop and Praise & Worship departments at the Gerth Medien publishing house in Aßlar as A&R Director and Head of Distribution. Since 2008 he has worked primarily as a freelancer and travels to seminars, concert readings and concerts in German-speaking countries.

As a singer, guitarist, lyricist, composer, book author, speaker, and producer, he frequently performs, sharing the stage with Gregor Meyle, Michael W. Smith, Newsboys, Casting Crowns, Matt Redman, Martin Smith, Paul Colman, Larry Norman, Claas P. Jambor, Someday Jacob, Sara Lorenz, Sefora Nelson, Noel Richards, Brian Doerksen, Graham Kendrick, the Outbreakband, and many others. He has released numerous CDs under his own name in the field of "modern church music" as well as with concert music.

Kopfermann was the initiator of the Ichthys Worship Night in Frankfurt, which took place six times a year from 2002 to 2010. Since 2005, he has been a music ambassador for the aid organization World Vision Germany alongside Judy Bailey, and since 1999, he has been a lecturer at the Worship Academy in Altensteig.

In the summer of 2006 he performed as a musician at the large event Calling All Nations in Berlin, initiated by Noel Richards.

Arne Kopfermann is married and has a son. He processed the tragic death of his ten-year-old daughter in a car accident, for which he was partly responsible in 2014, through a double CD and the book Mitten aus dem Leben in 2017. He described the impact of this event on his relationship with God in his 2020 book Auf zu neuen Ufern.

== Publications ==
- Das Lobpreis-ABC. Fundamente für eine ausgewogene Lobpreispraxis, Asaph-Verlag, Lüdenscheid 1996, ISBN 978-3-931025-09-0.
- Kopfermann 1988–1998. 50 Songs, Asaph-Verlag, Lüdenscheid 1998, ISBN 978-3-931025-54-0.
- Wer ist ein Gott wie du? 52 Andachten zu bekannten Lobpreis-Songs, Projektion J, Aßlar 2003, ISBN 978-3-89490-481-4.
- Das Geheimnis von Lobpreis und Anbetung. Das Handbuch für die Praxis, Projektion J, Aßlar 2001, ISBN 978-3-89490-336-7.
- Das Geheimnis von Lobpreis und Anbetung (Überarbeitete und erweiterte Neuausgabe), C&P Verlag, Glashütten 2009, ISBN 978-3-86770-121-1.
- Mitten aus dem Leben. Wenn ein Sturm deine Welt aus den Angeln hebt, Gerth Medien, Aßlar 2017, ISBN 978-3-95734-237-9.
- Auf zu neuen Ufern. Befreit zu einem ehrlichen Glauben, der trägt, Gerth Medien, Aßlar 2020, ISBN 978-3-95734-672-8.

== Discography ==
- Im Glanz Deiner Heiligkeit, Colour Collection 1990
- Voice of Unity, Colour Collection 1992
- Writing on the Wall, Pila Music 1996
- Mit Deinen Augen, Colour Collection 1996
- Voll Sehnsucht, Asaph Musik 1997
- RMC feat. Gospelfloor, Pila Music 1997
- Er macht frei, Gerth Medien 1998
- Hör mir zu, Asaph Musik 1998
- Die Singles, Asaph Musik 1999
- Changes, Gerth Music 1999; Neuauflage als The Heart of Worship, Gerth Medien 2004
- Erwecke uns, Gerth Medien 2000
- Anbetung & Erweckung 2000, Live mit Albert Frey, Norm Strauss CAN, Gerth Medien 2000
- In Love with Jesus Vol. 1 – Vol. 8, Gerth Medien 2001–2008
- Es gibt einen Ort zum Beten Vol. 1, Live, Gerth Medien 2002
- Kopfermann Collection, Pop Songs Best Of, Gerth Medien 2002
- 1000 Gründe, Gerth Medien 2003
- Song of Heaven (in English with Lothar Kosse, Albert Frey) Gerth Medien 2003
- Arne Kopfermann – Von ganzem Herzen, Lobpreis Songs Best of 1994–2004, Gerth Medien 2004
- Es gibt einen Ort zum Beten Vol. 2, Live, Gerth Medien 2004
- Arne Kopfermann – Vergiss es nie, Gerth Medien Juni 2005
- Es gibt einen Ort zum Beten Vol. 3, Live, Gerth Medien 2007
- Arne Kopfermann & Friends – Geheimnisvoller Gott, Gerth Medien 2008
- Arne Kopfermann – Über dem Meer, Gerth Medien 2009
- Liebeslied, Gerth Medien 7/2009
- Ich werde still (Zum Jahr der Stille), Gerth Medien 9/2009
- In Love with Jesus – Ewig treuer Gott, Gerth Medien 9/2009
- Wenn der Tag kommt, Debütalbum von Sefora Nelson, Gerth Medien 3/2010
- Arne Kopfermann – Storys, Gerth Medien 9/2010
- Gott unserer Städte, Gerth Medien 1/2011
- Du bist erhoben, Gerth Medien 1/2011
- Ich werde still Vol. 2, Gerth Medien 7/2011
- Ich bin bei Dir, Gerth Medien 9/2011
- Allein Deine Gnade, Gerth Medien 1/2012
- Du allein rettest mich, Gerth Medien 1/2013
- Arne Kopfermann & Friends – Wenn ich nur Worte hätte, Gerth Medien 9/2012
- Ich bin bei Dir Vol. 2, Gerth Medien 1/2013
- So groß ist der Herr – Deine Liebe bleibt, Gerth Medien, 1/2014
- Wir beten an (orange), SCM Hänssler, 1/2014
- Arne Kopfermann – Weiter Weg, SCM Hänssler, 7/2014
- So groß ist der Herr – In Deinem Haus, Gerth Medien, 9/2014
- Anbetung zu Weihnachten – Du bist Liebe, Gerth Medien, 9/2014
- Wir beten an (grün), SCM Hänssler, 1/2015
- Warum mein Herz so an Dir hängt, Gerth Medien, 2/2015
- Liebe ohne Ende, Gerth Medien, 9/2015
- Feiert Jesus – Sein Wort, mein Lied, SCM Hänssler, 1/2016
- Dir gebührt die Ehre, Anbetungs Klassiker, Gerth Medien, 1/2016
- Feiert Jesus – Duette der Anbetung, SCM Hänssler, 9/2016
- Gnade lädt mich ein, SCM Hänssler, 9/2017
- Arne Kopfermann – Mitten aus dem Leben, SCM Hänssler, 9/2017
- Dir gehört mein Lob – Anbetungs Klassiker, Gerth Medien, 1/2018
