= Albert Frey-Wyssling =

Swiss botanist (1900–1988)

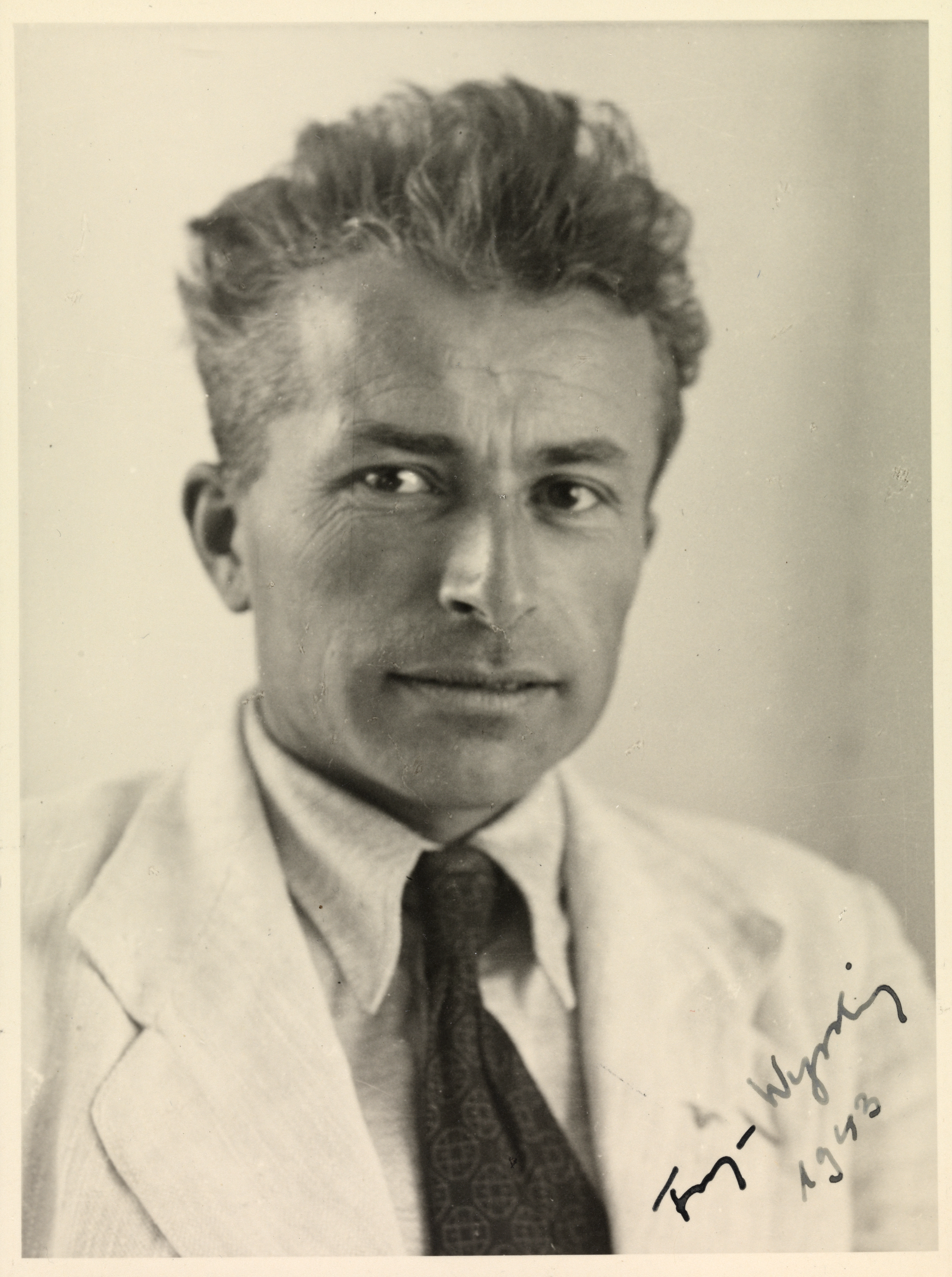
- Albert Frey-Wyssling
- Born: 8 November 1900; Küsnacht, Switzerland
- Died: 30 August 1988 (aged 87)
- Known for: crystallography
- Awards: Marcel Benoist Prize (1949); Fellow of the Royal Society
- Scientific career
- Fields: molecular biology
- Workplaces: Swiss Federal Institute of Technology

See also Albert Frey (disambiguation)

Dr Albert Friedrich Frey-Wyssling ForMemRS (8 November 1900 – 30 August 1988) was a Swiss botanist who pioneered submicroscopic morphology and helped initiate the study of molecular biology.

== Life ==
Frey-Wyssling was born Albert Frey in Küsnacht, where his father worked at the teacher training college of the Canton of Zürich teaching chemistry, geology, and anthropology. One of his grandfathers and several of his aunts were also teachers, and as a result thought that his own talent would be to teach. He entered the Realgymnasium in Zürich after six years of elementary school, and passed the graduation examination in 1919. He then went on to the Swiss Federal Institute of Technology (ETH) to join the faculty of natural sciences, intending to specialize in botany. Although during this time Zürich was home to some great botanists, he realized his specific talent was not in taxonomy but rather the study of plants through the fundamental sciences of chemistry, physics, and mathematics. When he needed to choose a field for his thesis, he decided upon the Department of General Botany and Plant Physiology. Influenced by his teacher, he used methods of crystallography to find a common species of crystals in plant cells. He received a degree as doctor of natural sciences in 1924.

He later took work which allowed him to gain experience with plant anatomy, microscopy, and plant physiology, before returning to the ETH as a research assistant in 1926. There he was asked to research wood by Paul Jaccard, department head and at the time a wood anatomist. However the salary of research assistants at this time was low, at least too low to get married and have a family. When he was offered a position of plant physiologist in Medan at rubber research station AVROS, he accepted and applied for leave as a lecturer. It was at this time that he married Margrit Wyssling, before leaving for Sumatra for four years. Frey took on his wife's name as Frey-Wyssling due to how common the name of Frey is in Switzerland. In 1932 he returned to Zurich after an appointment of lecturer at the ETH in the Department of General Botany, succeeding Jaccard. During the previous six years he had established his own school of study with both graduate and undergraduate students looking into cellular structure. In 1937 he went on leave to Vienna which introduced him to X-ray diffraction techniques which he later used in his studies.

Frey-Wyssling taught a range of subjects on plant morphology and physiology. His academic career reached its peak in 1957 when he was appointed Rector of the ETH, and held the position for four years. He also frequented the International Botanical Congresses, and often was made a guest-professor, including giving lectures at Harvard and Cornell, among other places. He retired from his teaching position in 1970, but continued to publish and attend congresses, as well as stay in contact with his successors.
