= Albert Frey (SS officer) =

German SS commander

- Born: 16 February 1913; Heidelberg, Grand Duchy of Baden, German Empire
- Died: 1 September 2003 (aged 90); Heilbronn, Baden-Württemberg, Germany
- Spouse: Liselotte Hermann (m. 1940)
- Military career
- Allegiance: Nazi Germany
- Branch: Waffen-SS
- Service years: 1933–45
- Rank: SS-Standartenführer der Waffen-SS
- Service number: NSDAP #4,137,086; SS #111,913
- Commands: SS-Verfügungstruppe; SS Panzer Division Leibstandarte
- Conflicts: World War II
- Awards: Knight's Cross of the Iron Cross with Oak Leaves

Albert Frey (16 February 1913 – 1 September 2003) was a German SS commander during the Nazi era. He commanded the SS Division Leibstandarte during World War II.

== Career ==
=== Early life ===
He was born in Heidelberg, in the German Empire, on 16 February 1913, the son of the master baker Heinrich Frey and his wife Therese. He joined the NSDAP on 1 May 1937. He joined the SS on 15 June 1933. He joined the SS-Verfügungstruppe in December 1933. In 1937, as an SS-Oberscharführer, he attended the SS-Junker school at Brunswick, where he came out in the top 12 on the course. In March 1938, he was promoted to an SS-Sturmfuhrer, and was posted as a platoon commander to the 1st SS Panzer Division Leibstandarte SS Adolf Hitler Regiment.

Commercial apprenticeship in the wine shop Straßenbach Heidelberg (broken off due to the death of his father), then employed as an assistant in various Heidelberg companies, at the same time further training in the commercial profession by attending evening courses and self-study, then 1 year trainee in the insurance office Freiherr von Petersdorff in Heidelberg, then from 1927 Employee in the correspondence department of the district office of the Nuremberg Life Insurance Bank in Mannheim.

=== World War II ===
On 20 April 1939, he was again promoted to SS-Obersturmführer, and given command of the 9th company of the Leibstandarte, for the Poland Campaign and the Battle of France. In November 1940, he took command of the 1st Company SS Division Leibstandarte which he commanded throughout the Balkan Campaign. After the start of Operation Barbarossa he was in July 1941 given command of the 3rd Battalion SS Division Leibstandarte. With this battalion, he had a decisive impact on the subsequent battle, capturing a bridge over the Mius north of Taganrog. The bridge was then attacked by three Russian armored trains. Despite severe losses, all three armored trains were destroyed. For this action Frey was awarded the German Cross in Gold. Frey proved himself again in the fighting at Kharkov through his personal courage and leadership of his battalion.

On April 20, 1942, he was promoted to SS-Sturmbannführer, and in July 1942 he took over the 1st battalion of the newly established 1st SS Panzer-Grenadier Regiment SS Division Leibstandarte. For his achievements during the battle between the Donetz and Dnieper at the beginning of 1943, he was awarded the Knight's of the Iron Cross, and a short time later he was appointed commander of the 1st SS Panzer Grenadier Regiment. He had a brief deployment in Italy, where he convinced an Italian General it was better to surrender than fight. He captured 10,000 prisoners.

He quickly returned to the Eastern Front for the Battle of Kursk where he commanded a battle group, consisting of his regiment, a Panther tank battalion, an assault gun company and an artillery battalion, which fought in the Kiev region. For this successful defense, he received on 27 December 1943 the Oak Leaves to the Knight's Cross. In March 1944, he now a SS Standartenführer was given command of the 1st SS Panzer Division Leibstandarte SS Adolf Hitler and transferred to the area Kamanetz-Podolsk. In June 1944, the division was in France for the Battle of Normandy, during which Frey was seriously wounded and had to give up command of the division.

Later in August 1944, he became a staff officer in the headquarters of 6th Panzer Army. At the end of the war, he was a liaison officer to the Gauleiter for the Upper Danube. He subsequently fled abroad so as to escape captivity.

=== After the war ===
On January 1, 1990, he published his book, Ich wollte die Freiheit. Erinnerungen des Kommandeurs des 1. Panzergrenadierregiments der ehemaligen Waffen-SS.

Albert Frey and his wife, Lotte died in the morning of 1 September 2003 in Heilbronn. Frey's wife Liselotte "Lotte" Hermann (born 8 May 1920, Heilbronn) was very ill. He shot his wife under a suicide pact, and then shot himself.

== Awards and decorations ==
- SS Zivilabzeichen (Nr. 46,902)
- Deutsches Reichssportabzeichen
- SA Sports Badge
- Eastern Medal
- SS-Degen
- Wound Badge on 1939
- Sudetenland Medal on 10 January 1939
- Anschluss Medal on 2 March 1939
- Iron Cross (1939) 2nd Class (25 September 1939) & 1st Class (30 June 1940)
- Infantry Assault Badge on 10 March 1940
- Spange Prager Burg on 1940 June 12
- SS-Ehrenring on 12 November 1941
- German Cross in Gold on 17 November 1941 as SS-Hauptsturmführer in the III./Bataillon LSSAH
- Order of Bravery on 6 July 1942
- Order of the Crown on 3 September 1942
- Knight's Cross of the Iron Cross with Oak Leaves
  - Knight's Cross on 3 March 1943 as SS-Sturmbannführer and commander of the I./SS-Panzergrenadier-Regiment LSSAH
  - Oak Leaves on 20 December 1943 as SS-Obersturmbannführer and commander of SS-Panzergrenadier-Regiment 1 LSSAH

== Dates of rank ==
Frey held various ranks in Waffen-SS.

Date	Waffen-SS
15 June 1933:	SS-Mann
6 January 1935:	SS-Sturmmann
20 April 1935:	SS-Rottenführer
10 May 1936:	SS-Unterscharführer
20 December 1936:	SS-Scharführer
1 October 1937:	SS-Standartenjunker
1 March 1938:	SS-Standarten-Oberjunker
19 March 1938:	SS-Untersturmführer
20 April 1939:	SS-Obersturmführer
8 November 1940:	SS-Hauptsturmführer
20 April 1942:	SS-Sturmbannführer
5 July 1943:	SS-Obersturmbannführer
6 August 1944:	SS-Standartenführer

== Bibliography ==
- Patzwall, Klaus D.; Scherzer, Veit (2001). Das Deutsche Kreuz 1941 – 1945 Geschichte und Inhaber Band II [The German Cross 1941 – 1945 History and Recipients Volume 2] (in German). Norderstedt, Germany: Verlag Klaus D. Patzwall. ISBN 978-3-931533-45-8.
- Scherzer, Veit (2007). Die Ritterkreuzträger 1939–1945 Die Inhaber des Ritterkreuzes des Eisernen Kreuzes 1939 von Heer, Luftwaffe, Kriegsmarine, Waffen-SS, Volkssturm sowie mit Deutschland verbündeter Streitkräfte nach den Unterlagen des Bundesarchives [The Knight's Cross Bearers 1939–1945 The Holders of the Knight's Cross of the Iron Cross 1939 by Army, Air Force, Navy, Waffen-SS, Volkssturm and Allied Forces with Germany According to the Documents of the Federal Archives] (in German). Jena, Germany: Scherzers Militaer-Verlag. ISBN 978-3-938845-17-2.
- Thomas, Franz (1997). Die Eichenlaubträger 1939–1945 Band 1: A–K [The Oak Leaves Bearers 1939–1945 Volume 1: A–K] (in German). Osnabrück, Germany: Biblio-Verlag. ISBN 978-3-7648-2299-6.
