= Noel Richards =

British singer (born 1956)

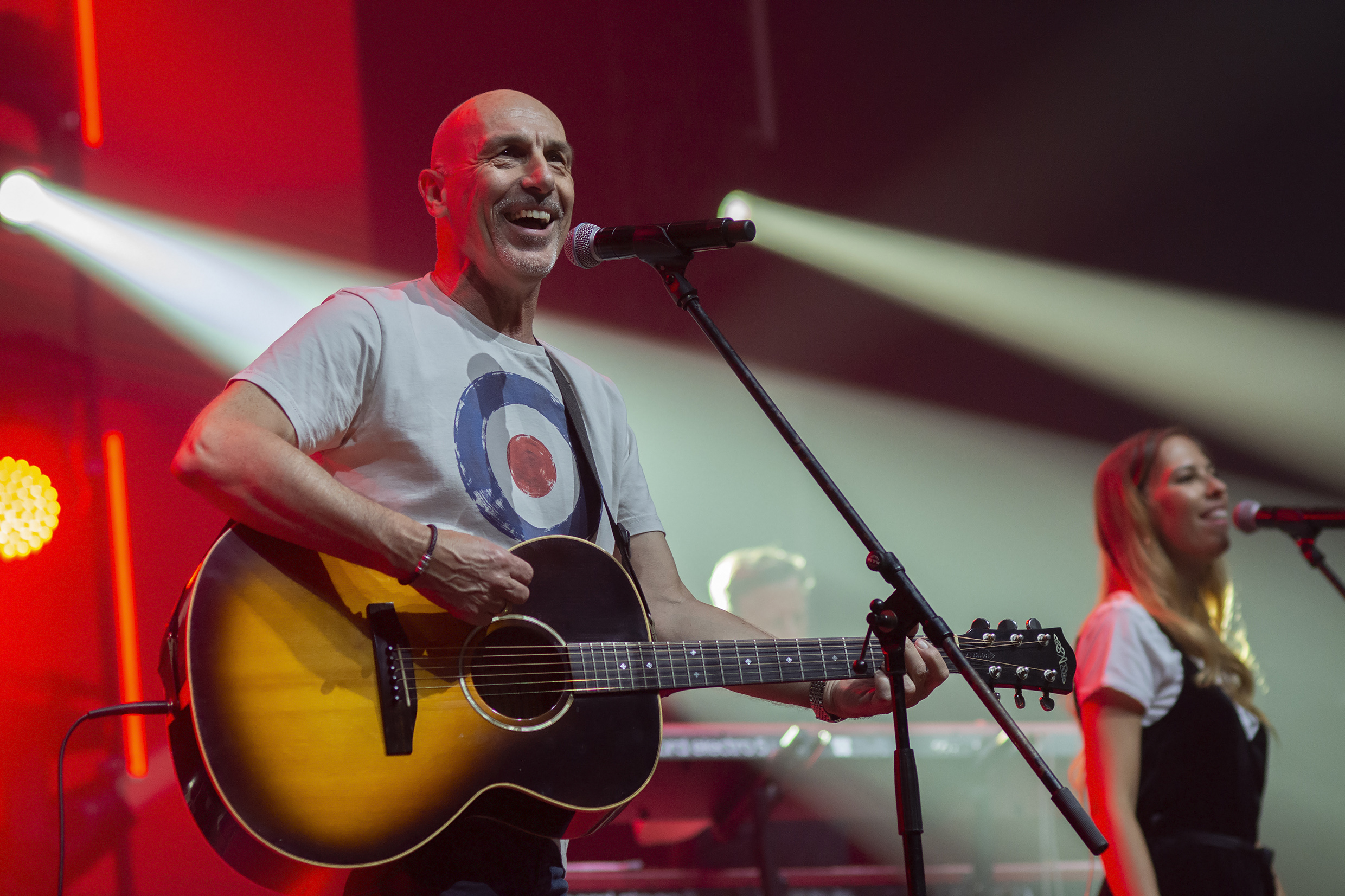
- Richards performing in Budapest Arena, 2019

Background information
- Born: Noel Richards; 16 February 1956 (age 70); Llantrisant, Wales
- Origin: Cobham, England
- Genres: Contemporary worship music
- Occupations: Singer-songwriter, Worship leader, Recording artist
- Instrument: Guitar
- Years active: 1980–present
- Label: Kingsway
- Website: www.noelrichards.com

Noel Richards is a Welsh singer-songwriter, worship leader, and recording artist. He has composed several songs that are used in contemporary worship, by Christians today, including "All Heaven Declares", "By Your Side", "Restorer of My Soul (My Lips Shall Praise You)" and "You Laid Aside Your Majesty".

== Biography ==
Noel Richards was born in Llantrisant near Cardiff. When he was eight or nine years old, he became a Christian. He entered into a deeper sense of commitment to God at the age of fifteen, following which he began to look upon John Glass as a role model. John Glass was a young pastor who had just arrived at Richards' church from Bible college. Glass taught Richards to play the guitar, sing and to present himself.

=== Musical career ===
Glass introduced Richards to the contemporary Christian music of that time, in 1971. Richards attended his first Christian music concert at the Colston Hall, Bristol. The event called "It's Buzz" was hosted by Pete Meadows. One of the performers at the event was Graham Kendrick. While watching Kendrick perform at the event, Richards thought to himself that that was what he wanted to do.

Following this event, Richards began singing at his own church. He also accompanied John Glass and other members of his own church when they set out on trips to other churches. On one of these trips, Glass introduced Richards to the man who was running the Youth for Christ operations in Bristol. This introduction became a turning point in Richards' life, as he became involved with evangelism before finally devoting his life to ministry.

=== Stadium Events ===
Richards was behind two major Christian music stadium events, one held at Wembley Stadium, London, England on June 28, 1997, and one held at the Berlin Olympic Stadium, Germany in July 2006. He also participated in a similar event in Budapest, Hungary during 2022.

=== Personal information ===
Richards has been married to his wife, Tricia since 1978. She has sung on many of his songs with him, complementing his vocals. She has cowritten songs with him. They have two children together, Sam and Amy.

== Noel Richards Band ==
Noel Richards Band is the band with which Noel Richards records and performs at live events. The band has been playing since the late 1980s, though there have been numerous line-up changes. Bradley Mason, the drummer, is currently the longest-serving member of the band, apart from Richards. He has been a part of the band since 1989. The current line-up of the band is:

- Sam Richards – keys
- Neil Costello – guitars
- Brad Mason – drums
- Mark Prentice – bass

This line-up of the Noel Richards Band recorded the 2004 album Road to Berlin. The band also frequently collaborates with several musicians, including (but not limited to) Matt Weeks (bass), Dave Eslick (Bass), Dan Crack (drums), Chris Stang (guitar), Christoph Bonnen (keys). The Noel Richards Band has performed in various types of venues in countries around the world. It has played in Brazil, United States, Canada, UK, Germany, Slovakia, Czech Republic, Hungary, South Africa and Finland.

== WorshipJournal.com ==
Noel Richards was responsible for the creation of and maintaining the online resource, www.worshipjournal.com. Launched on 2 April 2008, WorshipJournal.com was a worship resource website which offered free resources for Christians, churches and worship leaders. The site provided a library of music, video, art, photography, poetry and teachings that were downloaded free of charge. The website closed during 2010 due to falling user numbers and competition from popular social networks.

== Discography ==
Richards has released several albums since 1986.

- The Danger Line (1986)
- Lionheart (1989)
- By Your Side (1990)
- Up to Zion (1991)
- Thunder in the Skies (1993) (UK Christian Booksellers Album of the Year, 1994)
- Warrior (1994) (Highest-selling Richards' album)
- Dangerous People (1996)
- Noel Richards Live (1996)
- Behold the Lord - The New Hymn-Makers (1997) (Songs by Noel and Tricia Richards and Chris Bowater)
- Calling All Nations (1999)
- The Songs of Noel Richards (2004)
- Road to Berlin - Noel Richards Band (2004)
- Noel Richards - 25 Years. The Singer, The Songs (2005)
- Calling All Nations - Global Gathering (2006)
- Love Songs from Heaven (2008) (A collection of Richards' well-known songs, sung by other worship music artists.)
- Heaven's King (2008)

=== The Hudson Taylors ===
The Hudson Taylors is a group of worship leaders Noel Richards, Wayne Drain and Brian Houston. The group have released two studio albums.

- Hurricane (2002)
- The Lord Bless And Keep You (2011)
