= Albert Frey (musician) =

German Christian singer (born 1964)

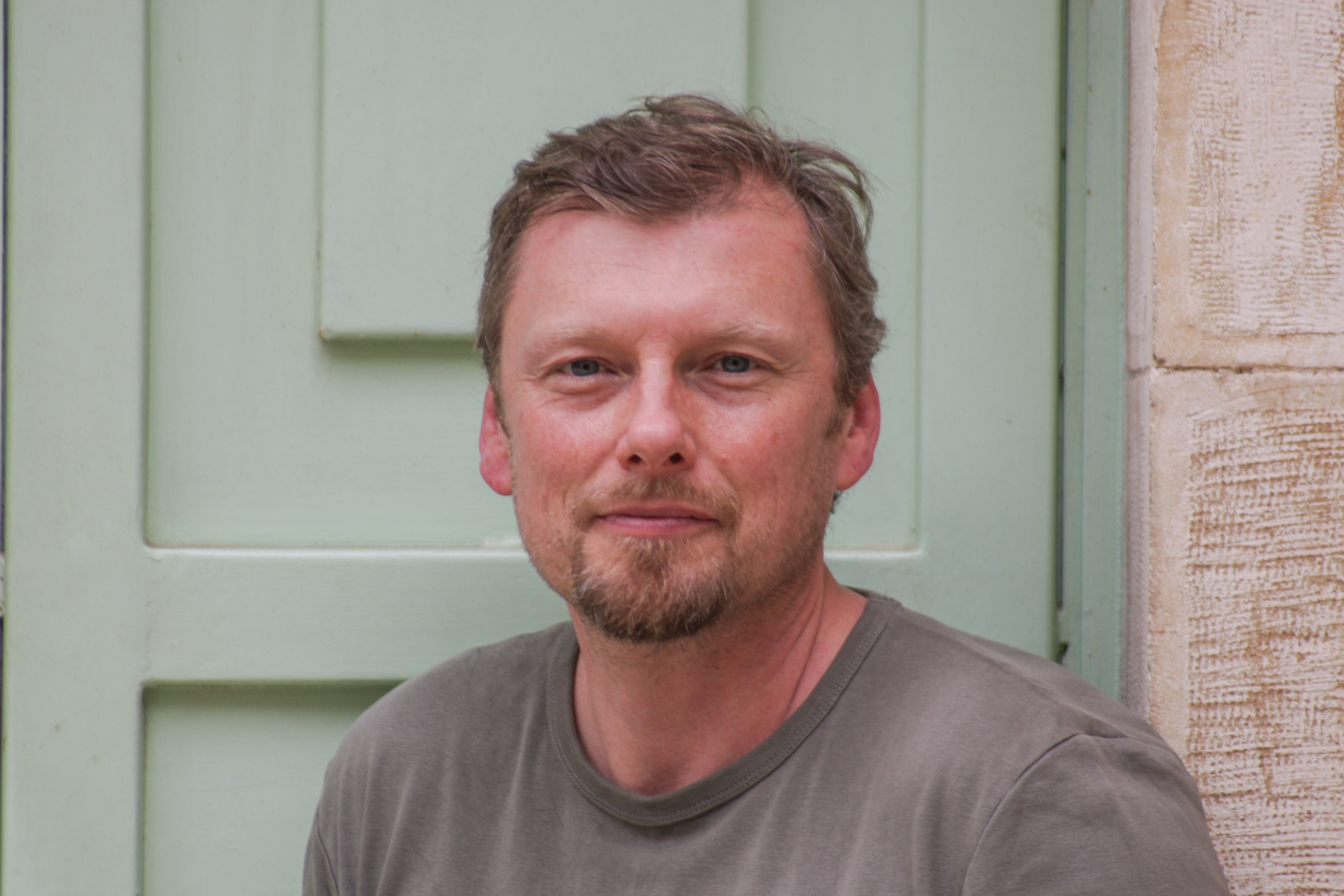
- Albert Frey (2008)

Background information
- Born: Albert Frey; 29 May 1964 (age 62); Ravensburg, Baden-Württemberg, West Germany
- Origin: Ravensburg, Baden-Württemberg, West Germany
- Genres: Pop, contemporary Christian music, praise and worship music, adult contemporary
- Occupations: Singer-songwriter, audio engineer
- Years active: 1997–present
- Labels: Hänssler, Gerth Medien, Creative Kirche
- Website: www.adams-frey.de

Albert Frey (born 29 May 1964 near Ravensburg) is a German singer, songwriter and music producer of contemporary Christian music, especially praise and worship music.

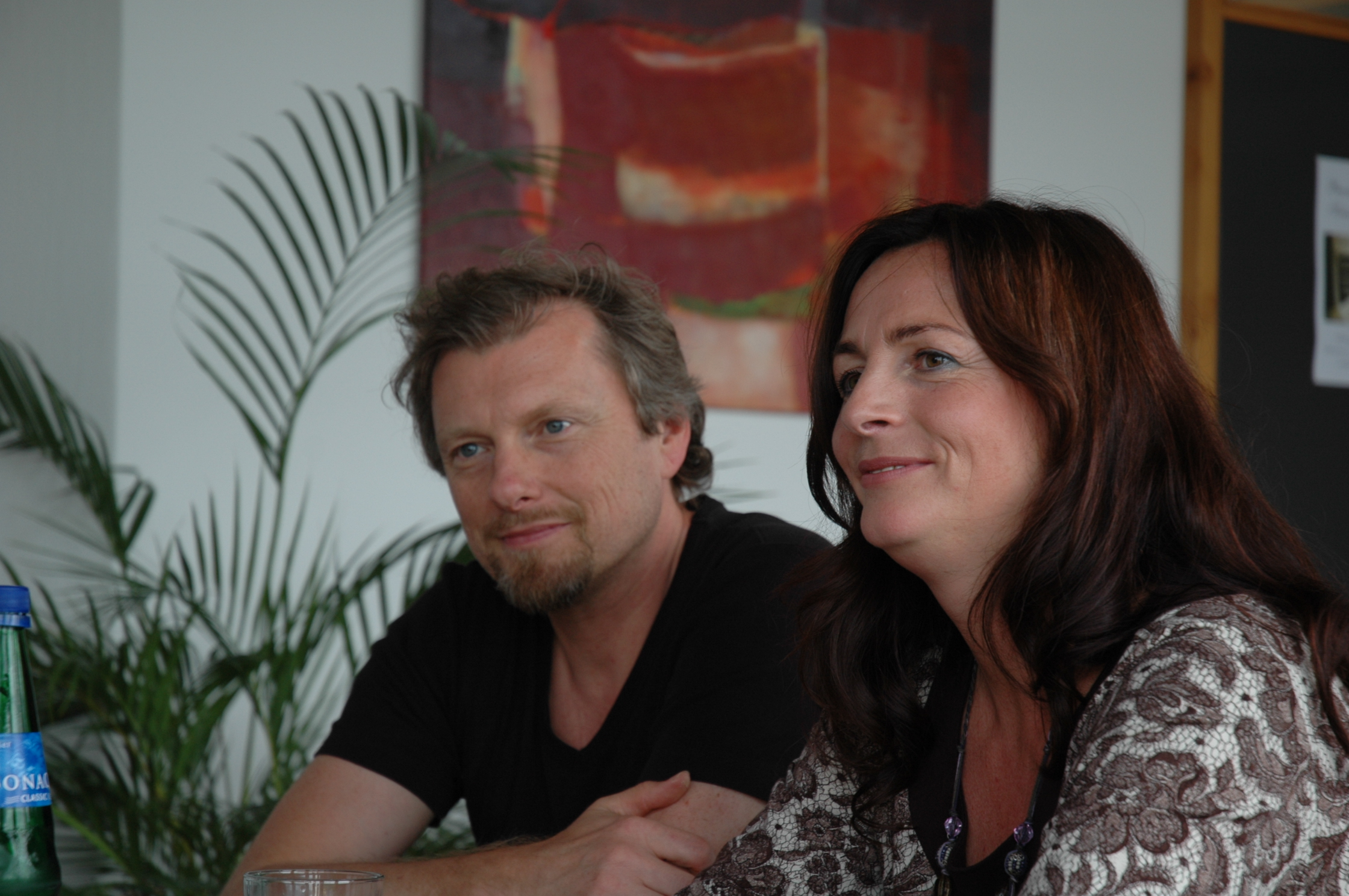
Albert Frey and Andrea Adams-Frey (2010)

== Biography ==
As son of a music teacher and church musician, Frey began his musical education very early. At the age of seven, he began to learn recorder and piano. Later followed clarinet and guitar, which he played in school bands. He came to a personal Christian faith in the early 1980s, during involvement with Catholic charismatic youth work in Ravensburg. Shortly afterwards, he joined the Christian rock band Effata.

In the early 1990s, he graduated as an audio engineer and set up his own recording studio. Since 1989, Albert Frey has been involved in the Christian music scene as a composer, producer and worship leader in his self-founded Immanuel-Lobpreis-Werkstatt Ravensburg. Since the mid-1990s, he has been responsible for the CD and songbook series Feiert Jesus! (Celebrate Jesus!). He has published more than 240 compositions to date and has been involved in over 50 CD productions. Frey also produces CDs for other artists, such as Conny Reusch, Andreas Volz and Christoph Zehendner.

Since 2001 Frey has been married to Christian singer Andrea Adams-Frey and is active as a speaker and author for the Christian magazine Aufatmen (take a deep breath). In 2009, together with his wife, he started the pastoral care congress "Zuerst geliebt" (First loved). Since 2011, the congress has continued under the title "Lebendig" (Living). The couple have lived on their own horse farm in Forchtenberg since 2012, where their Adenhof Studio is also located.

In March 2011, Albert Frey received the IMPALA Silver Award for his albums Für den König, Anker in der Zeit and Land der Ruhe, each of which had sold over 20,000 copies.

After working on various solo albums, in 2023 he released the pop oratorio 7 Worte vom Kreuz (Seven words from the cross). The oratorio, which deals with the Passion story, will also be performed live with different choirs from 2024.

== Discography ==
Year	Title	Label	Information
1997	Bis du kommst – Lieder für den Gottesdienst	D&D Medien	
1998	24/12 Bewegte Weihnachten	Hänssler Verlag	
1998	Unser Vater	Projektion J	
2000	Anbetung & Erweckung 2000	Gerth Medien	Live recording with Arne Kopfermann, Norm Strauss
2000	Nichts will ich mehr – Albert Frey live	Schulte & Gerth	Live recording from the congress Jesus 2000 in Nuremberg, May 1999
2001	Leviten Camp Live	Schleife Verlag	with Lilo Keller, Don Potter, Lothar Kosse, Peter Helms
2002	Zwischen Himmel und Erde	Gerth Medien	
2003	Song of heaven – Worship from Germany	Gerth Medien	in English, with Arne Kopfermann, Lothar Kosse
2004	Anker in der Zeit – Lobpreissongs 1992–2004	Gerth Medien	Compilation
2006	Für den König	Gerth Medien	
2006	Land der Ruhe	Gerth Medien	with Andrea Adams-Frey
2008	Zuerst geliebt	Gerth Medien	with Andrea Adams-Frey
2009	Wer ist ein Gott wie du – Die Highlights	Gerth Medien	with Andrea Adams-Frey
2010	Urklang	Gerth Medien	First appeared in a limited edition as one part of a double album with the Andrea Adams-Frey album Lebendig
2012	Im Namen des Vaters	Gerth Medien	with Andrea Adams-Frey
2013	Tiefer sehen	Gerth Medien	with Andrea Adams-Frey
2016	Komm zur Quelle	Gerth Medien	with Andrea Adams-Frey
2017	Wild & Weise	Gerth Medien	Solo album, especially for men
2018	Meine Seele singe – Lobpreissongs 2004–2018	Gerth Medien	Compilation (DCD)
2020	Damit wir das Leben haben	Gerth Medien	with Andrea Adams-Frey
2023	7 Worte vom Kreuz	Creative Kirche	Oratorio with Andrea Adams-Frey, Lena Belgart, Lars Peter, Michael Janz (Double CD)
