= 1st SS Panzer Division Leibstandarte SS Adolf Hitler =

German armored division from 1933 to 1945

- 1. SS-Panzerdivision Leibstandarte SS Adolf Hitler; — 1. SS-PzDiv LSSAH —
- Unit insignia, a skeleton key
- Active: 9 November 1933 – 8 May 1945
- Country: Germany
- Branch: Waffen-SS
- Type: Panzer
- Role: Armoured warfare
- Size: Division
- Patron: Adolf Hitler
- Engagements: Anschluss; German occupation of Czechoslovakia; World War II; Invasion of Poland; Battle of the Netherlands; Battle of France; Battle of Greece; Operation Barbarossa; Third Battle of Kharkov; Italian Campaign; Battle of Kursk; Kamenets–Podolsky pocket; Western Front 1944; Operation Lüttich; Falaise pocket; Ardennes Offensive; Operation Southwind; Operation Spring Awakening; Battle of Berlin

Commanders
- Notable commanders: Julius Schreck (January – 9 November 1923); Sepp Dietrich (17 March 1933 – 1 August 1944); Paul Hausser (1–28 August 1944)

The 1st SS Panzer Division Leibstandarte SS Adolf Hitler or SS Division Leibstandarte, abbreviated as LSSAH (German: 1. SS-Panzerdivision "Leibstandarte SS Adolf Hitler"), was a Waffen-SS Panzer division that served from 1933 until it was disbanded in 1945. It began as Adolf Hitler's personal bodyguard unit, responsible for guarding the Führer's person, offices, and residences. Initially the size of a regiment, the LSSAH eventually grew into a division-sized unit during World War II.

The LSSAH participated in combat during the invasion of Poland and was amalgamated into the Waffen-SS together with the SS-Verfügungstruppe (SS-VT) and the combat units of the SS-Totenkopfverbände (SS-TV) prior to Operation Barbarossa in 1941. By mid-1942 it had been increased in size from a regiment to a Panzergrenadier division and was designated SS Panzergrenadier Division "Leibstandarte SS Adolf Hitler". It received its final form as a Panzer division in October 1943.

Members of the LSSAH perpetrated numerous atrocities and war crimes, including the Malmedy massacre. They killed an estimated 5,000 prisoners of war in the period 1940–1945, mostly on the Eastern Front.

== Early history (1923–1933) ==
In the early days of the Nazi Party, the leadership realized that a bodyguard unit composed of reliable men was needed. Ernst Röhm formed a guard formation from the 19.Granatwerfer-Kompanie ("19th Grenade Thrower Company"); from this formation the Sturmabteilung (SA) soon evolved. Adolf Hitler in early 1923, ordered the formation of a small separate bodyguard dedicated to his service rather than "a suspect mass", such as the SA. Originally the unit was composed of only eight men, commanded by Julius Schreck and Joseph Berchtold. It was designated the Stabswache (staff guard). The Stabswache were issued unique badges, but at this point was still under SA control. Schreck resurrected the use of the Totenkopf ("death's head") as the unit's insignia, a symbol various elite forces had used in the past, including specialized assault troops of Imperial Germany in World War I who used Hutier infiltration tactics.

In May 1923, the unit was renamed Stoßtrupp (Shock Troop)–Hitler. The unit numbered no more than 20 members at that time. On 9 November 1923, the Stoßtrupp, along with the SA and several other Nazi paramilitary units, took part in the abortive Beer Hall Putsch in Munich. In the aftermath, Hitler was imprisoned and his party and all associated formations, including the Stoßtrupp, were disbanded.

The second model of the LSSAH Standard, modelled after the Roman Vexillum

In the mid-1920s, violence remained a large part of Bavarian politics. Hitler was a potential target. In 1925, Hitler ordered the formation of a new bodyguard unit, the Schutzkommando (protection command). The unit was renamed the Sturmstaffel (assault squadron) and in November was renamed the Schutzstaffel, abbreviated to SS. By 1933 the SS had grown from a small bodyguard unit to a formation of over 50,000 men. The decision was made to form a new bodyguard unit, again called the Stabswache, which was mostly made up of men from the 1st SS-Standarte. By 1933 this unit was placed under the command of Sepp Dietrich, who selected 117 men to form the SS-Stabswache Berlin on 17 March 1933. The unit replaced the army guards at the Reich Chancellery. Out of this initial group, three eventually became divisional commanders, at least eight would become regimental commanders, fifteen became battalion commanders, and over thirty became company commanders in the Waffen-SS. Eleven men from the first company of 117 went on to win the Knights Cross, and forty of them were awarded the German Cross in gold for bravery. Later in 1933, two further training units were formed: ''SS-Sonderkommando Zossen on 10 May, and a second unit, designated SS-Sonderkommando Jüterbog on 8 July. These were the only SS units to receive military training at that time. Most of the training staff came from the ranks of the army. On 3 September 1933 the two Sonderkommando merged into the SS-Sonderkommando Berlin under Dietrich's command. Most of their duties involved providing outer security for Hitler at his residences, public appearances and guard duty at the Reich Chancellery.

In November 1933, on the 10th anniversary of the Beer Hall Putsch, the Sonderkommando took part in the rally and memorial service for the Nazi Party members who had been killed during the putsch. During the ceremony, the members of the Sonderkommando swore personal allegiance to Hitler. At the conclusion the unit received the new title, "Leibstandarte Adolf Hitler" (LAH). The term Leibstandarte was derived partly from Leibgarde – a somewhat archaic German translation of "Guard of Corps" or personal bodyguard of a military leader (Leib, lit. 'body, torso') – and Standarte: the Schutzstaffel (SS) or Sturmabteilung (SA) term for a regiment-sized unit, also the German word for a specific type of heraldic flag (Standard).

== Expansion ==
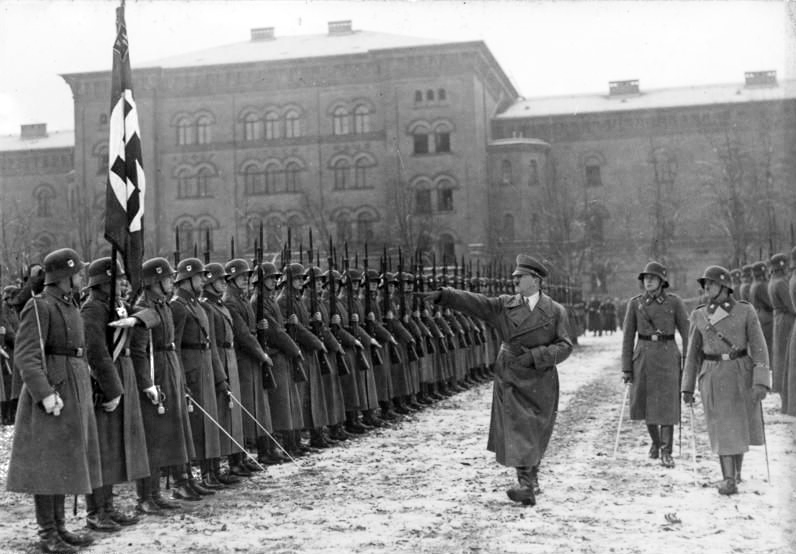
December 1935 parade for Adolf Hitler at the LSSAH Barracks in Berlin-Lichterfelde. Sepp Dietrich is on the far right.

On 13 April 1934, Heinrich Himmler, head of the SS, ordered the Leibstandarte Adolf Hitler (LAH) to be renamed "Leibstandarte SS Adolf Hitler" (LSSAH). Himmler inserted the SS initials into the name to make it clear that the unit was independent from the SA or the army. The LSSAH was designated a "National Socialist" unit, which eventually grew into an elite Panzer Division of the Waffen-SS. Although nominally under Himmler, Dietrich was the real commander and handled day-to-day administration.

During 1934, Stabschef-SA Ernst Röhm continued to push for greater political influence for his already powerful SA. Hitler decided that the SA had to be eliminated as an independent political force and ordered the LSSAH to prepare for the action. The LSSAH formed two companies under the control of Jürgen Wagner and Otto Reich, these formations were moved to Munich on 30 June.

Hitler ordered all SA leaders to attend a meeting at the Hanselbauer Hotel in Bad Wiessee, near Munich. Hitler along with Sepp Dietrich and a unit from the LSSAH travelled to Bad Wiessee to personally oversee Röhm's arrest on 30 June. Later at around 17:00 hours, Dietrich received orders from Hitler for the LSSAH to form an "execution squad" and go to Stadelheim prison where certain SA leaders were being held. There in the prison courtyard, the LSSAH firing squad shot five SA generals and an SA colonel. Additional alleged "traitors" were shot in Berlin by a unit of the Leibstandarte. On 1 July Hitler finally agreed with Göring and Himmler that Röhm should be executed. In what the Nazis called the Röhm Putsch, but otherwise came to be known as the Night of the Long Knives, companies of the LSSAH, together with the Gestapo and Göring's Landespolizeigruppe, performed Death Squad actions. At least 85, but most likely no less than twice that number of people, were executed without trial over the next few days.

This action succeeded in effectively decapitating the SA and removing Röhm's threat to Hitler's leadership. In recognition of their actions, both the LSSAH and the Landespolizeigruppe General Göring were expanded to regimental size and motorized. In addition, the SS became an independent organization, no longer part of the SA.

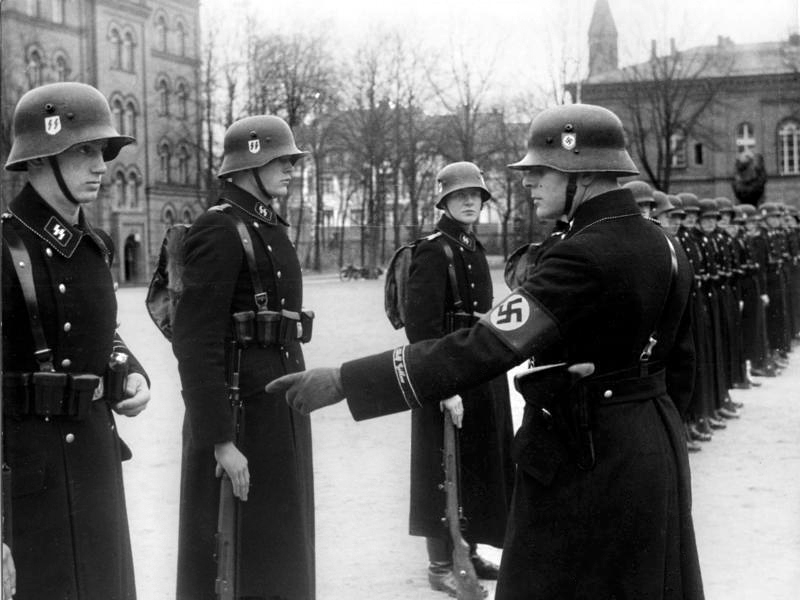
The Leibstandarte SS Adolf Hitler barracks in Berlin, 1938

The LSSAH provided the honor guard at many of the Nuremberg Rallies, and in 1935 took part in the reoccupation of the Saarland. On 6 June 1935, the LSSAH officially adopted a field-grey uniform to identify itself more with the army, which wore a similar uniform. The LSSAH was later in the vanguard of the march into Austria as part of the Anschluss, and in 1938 the unit took part in the occupation of the Sudetenland. By 1939, the LSSAH was a full infantry regiment with three infantry battalions, an artillery battalion, and anti-tank, reconnaissance and engineer sub-units. Soon after its involvement in the annexation of Bohemia and Moravia, the LSSAH was redesignated "Infanterie-Regiment Leibstandarte SS Adolf Hitler (mot.)". When Hitler ordered the formation of an SS division in mid-1939, the Leibstandarte was designated to form its own unit, unlike the other Standarten of the SS-Verfügungstruppe (SS-VT) (SS-Standarte Deutschland, SS-Standarte Germania, and SS-Standarte Der Führer). The Polish crisis of August 1939 put these plans on hold, and the LSSAH was ordered to join XIII. Armeekorps, a part of Army Group South, which was preparing for the attack on Poland.

The Leibstandarte division's symbol was a skeleton key, in honor of its first commander, Josef "Sepp" Dietrich (Dietrich is German for skeleton key or lock pick); it was retained and modified to later serve as the symbol for I SS Panzer Corps.

== Invasion of Poland ==
During the initial stages of the invasion of Poland, the LSSAH was attached to the 17. Infanterie-Division and tasked with providing flank protection for the southern pincer. The regiment was involved in several battles against Polish cavalry brigades attempting to hit the flanks of the German advance. At Pabianice, a town near Łódź, the LSSAH fought elements of the Polish 28th Infantry Division and the Wołyńska Cavalry Brigade in close combat. Throughout the campaign, the unit was notorious for burning villages and members of the LSSAH committed atrocities in numerous Polish towns, including the murder of 50 Jews in Błonie and the massacre of 200 civilians, including children, who were machine gunned in Złoczew. Shootings also took place in Bolesławiec, Torzeniec, Goworowo, Mława, and Włocławek.

After the success at Pabianice, the LSSAH was sent to the area near Warsaw and attached to the 4. Panzer-Division under then Generalmajor (brigadier general) Georg-Hans Reinhardt. The unit saw action preventing encircled Polish units from escaping and repelling several attempts by other Polish troops to break through. In spite of the swift military victory over Poland, the regular army had reservations about the performance of the LSSAH and SS-VT units due to their higher casualty rate than the army units.

== Invasion of France ==
In early 1940 the LSSAH was expanded into a full independent motorized infantry regiment and a Sturmgeschütz (Assault Gun) battery was added to their establishment. The regiment was shifted to the Dutch border for the launch of Fall Gelb. It was to form the vanguard of the ground advance into the Netherlands, tasked with capturing a vital bridge over the IJssel, attacking the main line of defense at the Grebbeberg (the Grebbeline), and linking up with the Fallschirmjäger of Generaloberst Kurt Student's airborne forces, the 7. Flieger-Division and the 22. Luftlande-Infanterie-Division.

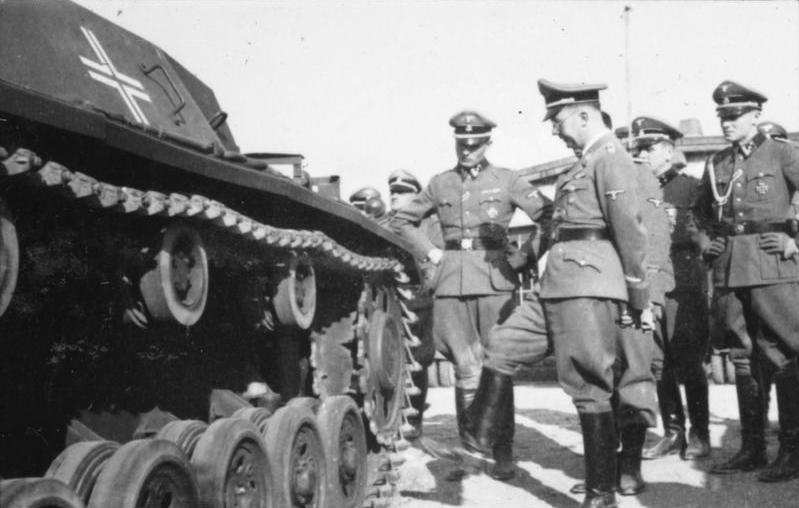
Heinrich Himmler inspecting a Sturmgeschütz III, Metz, September 1940

Fall Gelb—the invasion of France and the Low Countries—was launched on 10 May 1940. On that day, the LSSAH crossed the Dutch border, covered over 75 kilometres (47 mi), and secured a crossing over the IJssel near Zutphen after discovering that their target bridge had been destroyed. Over the next four days, the LSSAH covered over 215 kilometres (134 mi), and upon entering Rotterdam, several of its soldiers accidentally shot at and seriously wounded General Student. After the surrender of Rotterdam, the LSSAH left for The Hague, which they reached on 15 May, after capturing 3,500 Dutch soldiers as prisoners of war. After the surrender of the Netherlands on 15 May, the regiment was then moved south to France.

After the British counterattack at Arras, the LSSAH, along with the SS-Verfügungs-Division, were moved to hold the perimeter around Dunkirk and reduce the size of the pocket containing the encircled British Expeditionary Force and French forces. The LSSAH took up a position 15 miles southwest of Dunkirk along the line of the Aa Canal, facing the Allied defensive line near Watten. That night the OKW ordered the advance to halt, with the British Expeditionary Force trapped. The LSSAH paused for the night. However, on the following day of 25 May, in defiance of Hitler's orders, Dietrich ordered his 3rd battalion to cross the canal and take the Wattenberg Heights beyond, where British artillery observers were putting the regiment at risk. They assaulted the heights and drove the observers off. Instead of being censured for his act of defiance, Dietrich was awarded the Knight's Cross of the Iron Cross.

On 26 May the German advance resumed. By 28 May the LSSAH had taken the village of Wormhout, only ten miles from Dunkirk. After their surrender, soldiers from the 2nd Battalion, Royal Warwickshire Regiment, along with some other units (including French soldiers) were taken to a barn in La Plaine au Bois near Wormhout and Esquelbecq. It was there that troops of the LSSAH 2nd battalion, under the command of SS-Hauptsturmführer Wilhelm Mohnke committed the Wormhoudt massacre, where 80 British and French prisoners of war were killed. Although it is unarguable that the massacre occurred, Mohnke's level of involvement is impossible to know; he was never formally charged and brought to trial.

== Invasion of Yugoslavia and Greece ==
After the conclusion of the Western campaign on 22 June 1940, the LSSAH spent six months in Metz (Moselle). It was expanded to brigade size (6,500 men). A 'Flak battalion' and a StuG Batterie were among the units added to the LSSAH. A new flag was presented by Heinrich Himmler in September 1940. During the later months of 1940, the regiment trained in amphibious assaults on the Moselle River in preparation for Operation Seelöwe, the invasion of England. After the Luftwaffe's failure in the Battle of Britain and the cancellation of the planned invasion, the LSSAH was shifted to Bulgaria in February 1941 in preparation for Operation Marita, part of the planned invasion of Greece and Yugoslavia.

The operation was launched on 6 April 1941 by aerial bombings of central-southern Yugoslavia, especially over Belgrade, causing enormous destruction and thousands of victims and wounded. After the LSSAH entered on 12 April into the Yugoslavian capital, then to follow the route of the 9. Panzer-Division, part of General der Panzertruppe Georg Stumme's XL Panzer Corps. The LSSAH crossed the border near Bitola and was soon deep in Greek territory.

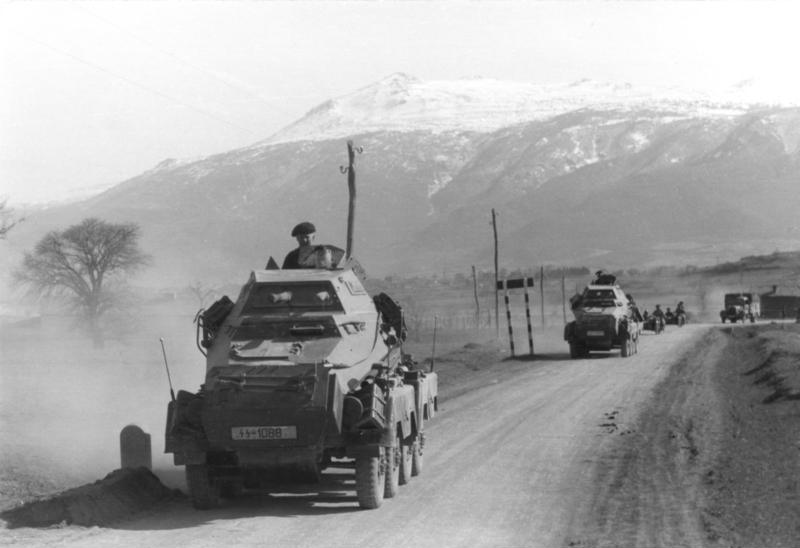
Sd.Kfz. 231 armored cars of the LSSAH advance into the Balkans near Sofia, Bulgaria, with Vitosha Mountain in the background.

The LSSAH captured Vevi on 10 April. SS-Sturmbannführer Kurt Meyer's reinforced Aufklärungs-Abteilung (reconnaissance battalion), LSSAH was tasked with clearing resistance from the Kleisoura Pass south-west of Vevi and driving through to the Kastoria area to cut off retreating Greek and British Commonwealth forces. Despite stiff resistance, Meyer's unit captured the pass.

The brigade participated in the clearing the Klidi Pass just south of Vevi, which was defended by a "scratch force" of Greek, Australian, British and New Zealand troops. An Australian artillery officer wrote of the Germans' "insolence" in driving "trucks down the main road – to within 3,000 yards (2,700 m) of our infantry" and there unloading the troops. The Germans were forced off the road by artillery fire and faced fierce resistance for more than two days. On the morning of 12 April the Germans renewed their attack, and by late afternoon the pass was cleared.

With the fall of the two passes the main line of resistance of the Greek Epirus army was broken, and the campaign became a battle to prevent the escape of the enemy. On 20 April, following a pitched battle in the 5,000-foot-high (1,500 m) Metsovon Pass in the Pindus Mountains, the commander of the Greek Epirus army surrendered the entire force to Dietrich. British Commonwealth troops were now the only Allied forces remaining in Greece, and they were falling back across the Corinth Canal to the Peloponnesos. By 26 April the LSSAH had reached the Gulf of Patras, and in an effort to cut off the retreating British Commonwealth forces, Dietrich ordered that his regiment cross the Gulf and secure the town of Patras in the Peloponnesus. Since no transport vessels were available, the LSSAH commandeered fishing boats and successfully completed the crossing but were forced to leave much of their heavy equipment behind. By 30 April the last British Commonwealth troops had either been captured or escaped. The LSSAH occupied a position of honor in the victory parade through Athens. After Operation Marita, the LSSAH was ordered north to join the forces of Army Group South massing for the launch of Operation Barbarossa.

== Invasion of the Soviet Union ==
Following LSSAH's outstanding performance during Marita, Himmler ordered that it should be upgraded to divisional status. The regiment, already the size of a reinforced brigade, was to be given motorized transport and redesignated "SS-Division (mot.) Leibstandarte SS Adolf Hitler". It was moved to Czechoslovakia in mid May for reorganization until being ordered to assemble in Poland for Operation Barbarossa, as part of Gerd von Rundstedt's Army Group South. There was not enough time to deliver all its equipment and refit it to full divisional status before the launch of the invasion of the Soviet Union, so the new "division" remained the size of a reinforced brigade, even though its expansion and development was of concern at the very highest ranks of command. Franz Halder, chief of the OKH General Staff noted on 20 June that "SS 'Adolf Hitler' will not be ready in time. Tracked components leave on 22 June, others not before 25 June," then more hopefully the next day; "Materiel position of SS 'Adolf Hitler' has improved, Div. may yet get ready in time."

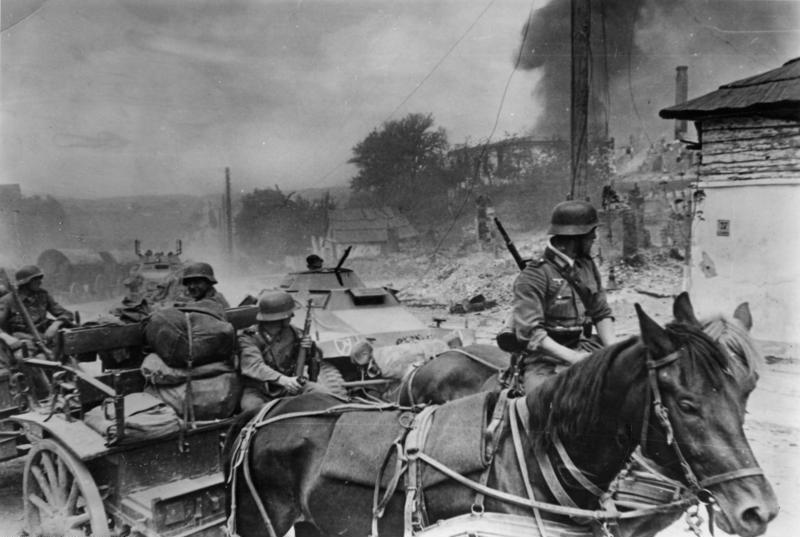
Wehrmacht horse-drawn artillery and armored cars of the LSSAH pass a burning Soviet village, August 1941.

Despite Halder's hopes, LSSAH was held in reserve attached to XIV Panzer Corps as part of Generalfeldmarschall Ewald von Kleist's 1st Panzer Group during the opening stages of the attack. Through July it was attached to III Panzer Corps before finishing August as part of XLVIII Panzer Corps. During this time, the LSSAH was involved in the Battle of Uman and the subsequent capture of Kiev. According to a postwar report by Waffen-SS journalist Erich Kern, the division murdered 4,000 Soviet prisoners in reprisal on 18 August, after finding the mutilated bodies of six dead divisional members who had been executed at Nowo Danzig, north of Kherson. These allegations have been researched using local units' war diaries; no mention of executed German soldiers during those dates has been found. For want of reliable evidence, not even accusations by the Soviet authorities, the allegations remained unproven.

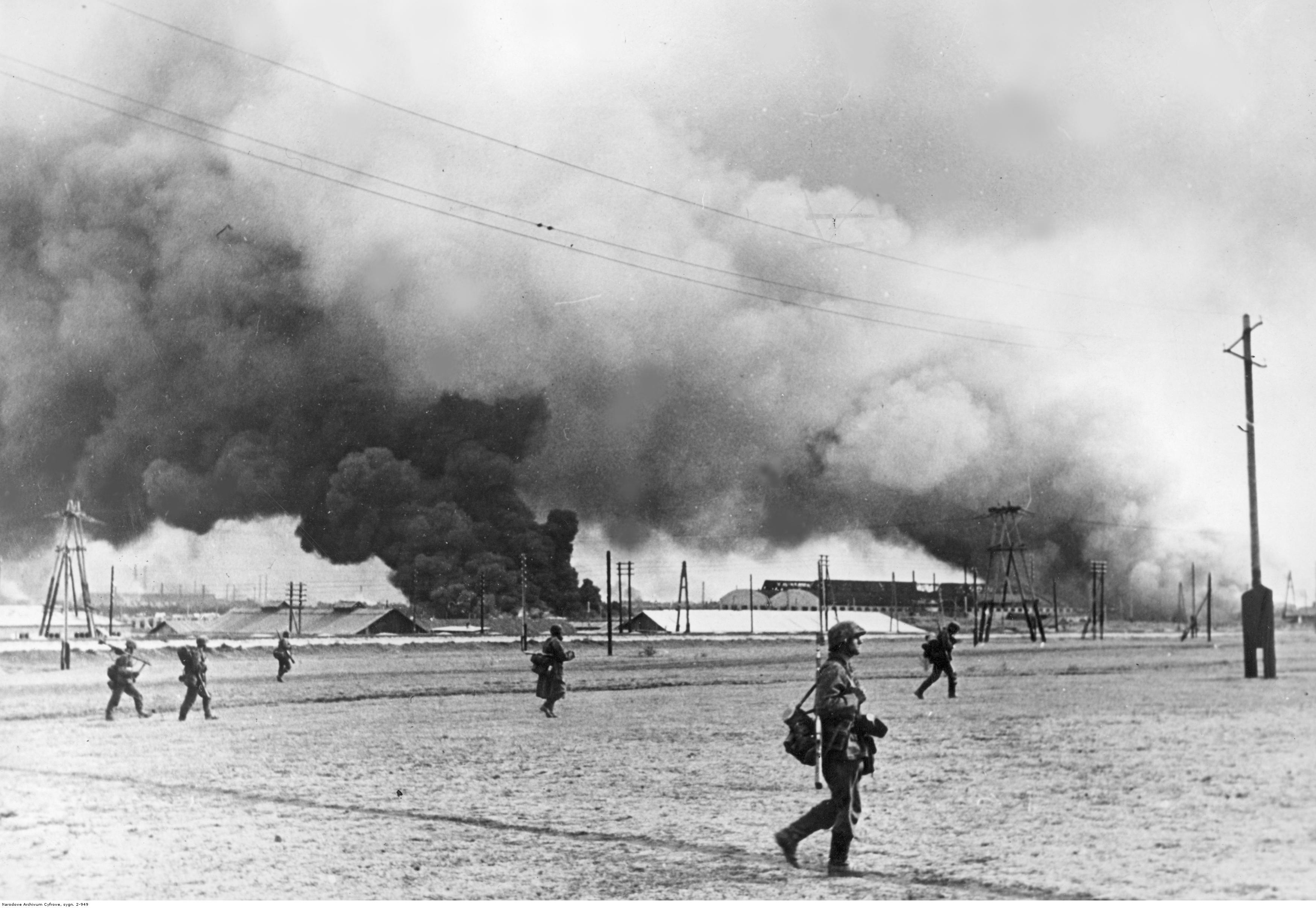
LSSAH enters burning Taganrog, October 1941.

In early September, the division was shifted to LIV Army Corps, as part of the 11th Army under Eugen Ritter von Schobert during the advance east after the fall of Kiev. Hoping to capitalize on the collapse of the Red Army defense on the Dnepr River the reconnaissance battalion of LSSAH was tasked with making a speedy advance to capture the strategically vital choke point of the Perekop Isthmus through a "coup de main" but were rebuffed by entrenched defenders at the town of Perekop. That same day, 12 September, 11th Army's commander was killed in an aircraft accident, and Hitler appointed Erich von Manstein to command. It took five days for Manstein to take matters in hand, and the operation to clear the Crimean Peninsula was not launched until 17 September. Manstein deployed LSSAH to create diversions while preparing for the main assault, intending to employ it to exploit an eventual breakthrough, but was forced to throw pioneers into the attack on the "Tatar Ditch" in the face of a furious counterattacks and did not break the Soviet defense for ten days.

On 8 October 1941, the LSSAH captured the major coastal city of Mariupol, catching the Soviets off guard.

In October, the LSSAH was transferred back north to help solidify the Axis line against fresh Soviet attacks against the Romanian 3rd Army and later took part in the heavy fighting for the city of Rostov-on-Don, which was captured in late November; there, the LSSAH took over 10,000 Red Army prisoners. However, by the end of the year, the German advance faltered as Soviet resistance grew stronger.

Under pressure from heavy Soviet counterattacks during the winter, the LSSAH and Army Group South retreated from Rostov to defensive lines on the river Mius. After the spring rasputitsa (seasonal mud) had cleared, the division joined in Fall Blau, participating in the fighting to retake Rostov-on-Don, which fell in late July 1942. Severely understrength, the LSSAH was transferred to the Normandy region of occupied France to join the newly formed SS Panzer Corps and to be reformed as a Panzergrenadier division.

=== Kharkov ===
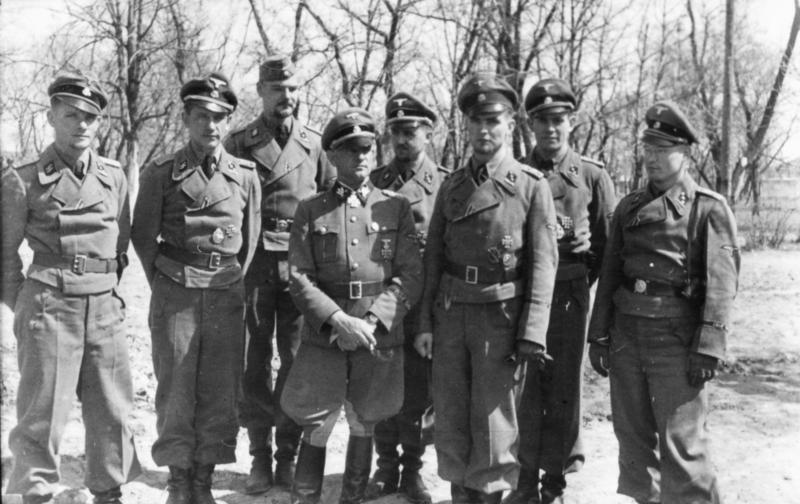
Sepp Dietrich in a medal ceremony for men of the LSSAH, Soviet Union 1942. Sepp Dietrich with von Westernhagen, Wiesemann, Max Wünsche and Karl Rettlinger.

The LSSAH spent the remainder of 1942 refitting as a panzergrenadier division. Thanks to the efforts of Himmler, along with SS-Obergruppenführer Paul Hausser, the SS Panzer Corps commander, the three SS Panzergrenadier divisions, LSSAH, Das Reich and Totenkopf, were to be formed with a full regiment of tanks rather than only a battalion. This meant that the SS Panzergrenadier divisions were full-strength Panzer divisions in all but name. The division also received nine Tiger 1 tanks, and these were formed into the 13th (schwere) Company/1st SS Panzer Regiment.

The collapse of the front around Stalingrad and the encirclement of the 6th Army created a threat to Field Marshal Erich von Manstein's Army Group Don. Manstein requested reinforcements to halt the Soviet attack near Kharkov. The SS Panzer Corps was then ordered east to join Manstein's forces.

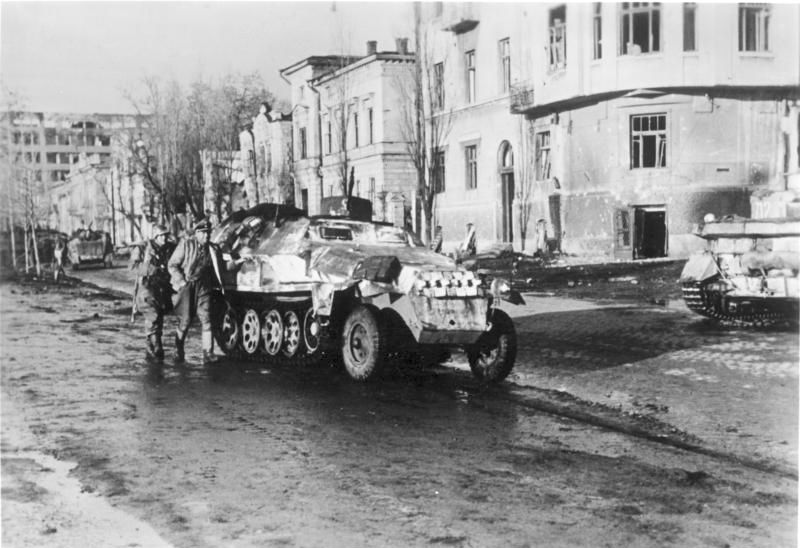
Fritz Witt, Kharkov March 1943

Arriving at the front in late January 1943, the LSSAH was engaged in fighting in and around Kharkov as a part of Hausser's SS Panzer Corps. In March 1943 the division participated in the recapture of Kharkov. On 12 March 1943, the LSSAH made progress into the city's center by breaking through the Soviet defenses in the northern suburbs. By the end of the day, the division had reached a position just two blocks north of Dzerzhinsky Square. The 2nd Panzergrenadier Regiment's 2nd Battalion was able to surround the square, after taking heavy casualties from Soviet snipers and other defenders, by evening. When taken, the square was renamed "Platz der Leibstandarte". Despite the declaration that the city had fallen, fighting continued on 15 and 16 March, as German units cleared the remnants of resistance in the tractor works factory complex, in the southern outskirts of the city. The city was taken on 17 March. While in Kharkov, troops of the LSSAH engaged in the murder of wounded Soviet soldiers that were located in the city's military hospital; several hundred were killed. Additionally, captured Soviet officers and commissars were routinely executed.

The division was pulled back to rest and refit. Division commander Sepp Dietrich was promoted to form a new Corps, the 1st SS Panzer Corps Leibstandarte, and the LSSAH was to supply all the senior officers for the new headquarters. At the same time a new SS division would be formed from members of the Hitler Youth and the LSSAH would supply all of the regimental, battalion and most of the company commanders. This new division would become the 12th SS Panzer Division (Hitlerjugend).

=== Massacre of civilians on the Eastern Front ===
During the fighting around Kharkov, a unit under the command of Joachim Peiper gained a nickname "Blowtorch Battalion", after the inhabitants of two Soviet villages were shot or burned. Ukrainian sources, including surviving witness Ivan Kiselev, who was 14 at the time of the massacre, described the killings at the villages of Yefremovka and Semyonovka on 17 February 1943. On 12 February Waffen-SS troops of the LSSAH occupied the two villages, where retreating Soviet forces had wounded two SS officers. In retaliation, five days later LSSAH troops killed 872 men, women and children. Some 240 of these were burned alive in the church of Yefremovka.

The reputation of the "Blowtorch Battalion" was confirmed in August 1944, when Sturmbannführer Jacob Hanreich was captured south of Falaise in France and interrogated by the Allies. He stated that Peiper was "particularly eager to execute the order to burn villages". Hanreich had previously served with Leibstandarte but was with SS Division Hitlerjugend at the time of his capture.

Additional sources support the division's reputation for brutality. The following statement, taken from the surreptitious recording of POWs' conversations by the Allies, describes the atrocities on the Eastern Front. SS-Untersturmführer Krämer (captured on the Western Front during his service with the SS Division Hitlerjugend) recounted the following from his time with the LSSAH:

I have experienced it in Russia at Orel. An MG 42 was set up in the main aisle of a church, [...] and the Russian men, women and children were taken into the church, without knowing at all what was happening. Then they were shot immediately with the MG 42 and petrol was poured on them and the whole place was set on fire.

=== Fabrikaktion Operation ===
Elements of LSSAH took part in Fabrikaktion ("factory action”), also known as the Großaktion Juden ("Major Action [on] Jews”), an operation to capture remaining German Jews working in the arms industry. Men of the LSSAH helped the Gestapo round up Jews in Berlin; people were taken from their jobs and herded into cattle wagons on 27–28 February 1943. Most of the captured perished either in Auschwitz or other camps in the East. In May 1943, Hans Frank shipped 500 watches collected from Auschwitz prisoners to soldiers of the 3rd SS Panzer Division Totenkopf.

== Battle of Kursk ==
The spring rasputitsa halted offensive operations, giving the LSSAH time to rest and refit. By early June 1943, the division had been fully refitted and was now under the command of SS-Brigadeführer, Theodor Wisch. Its armor strength was 12 Tiger Is, 72 Panzer IVs, 16 Panzer III and Panzer IIs, and 31 StuGs. In late June 1943, the formation of I SS Panzer Corps meant that Hausser's SS Panzer Corps was renamed II SS Panzer Corps.

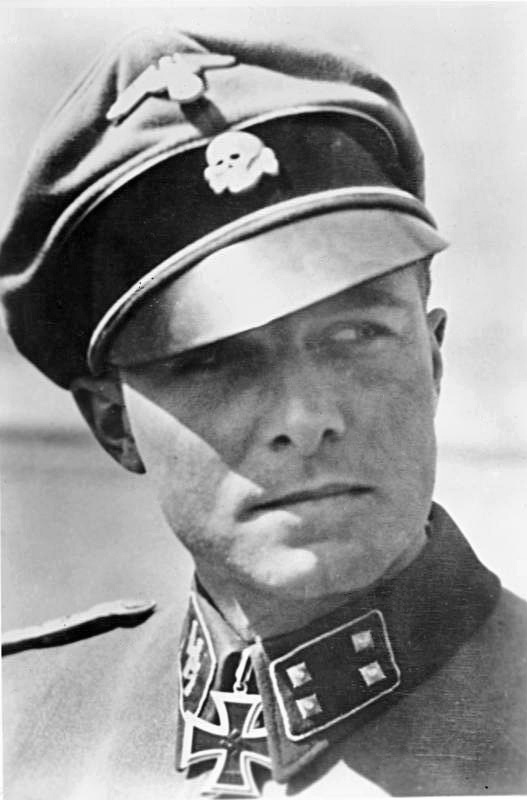
Joachim Peiper, commander of the division's 1st SS Panzer Regiment

The II SS Panzer Corps was moved north to Belgorod in preparation for the upcoming summer offensive Operation Citadel. The LSSAH, along with the SS Divisions Totenkopf and Das Reich, was to form the spearhead of General Hermann Hoth's 4th Panzer Army, tasked with breaching the southern flank of the Kursk salient. Field Marshal Walter Model's 9th Army was to breach the northern flank, and the two forces were to meet near the city of Kursk, to the east, thereby encircling a large Soviet force.

The attack commenced on 5 July. The LSSAH's panzers, advancing in Panzerkeils (wedges), soon ran into the elaborate defenses of the Red Army, which slowed the advance. Untersturmführer Michael Wittmann, a Tiger commander in Leibstandarte's heavy company, destroyed eight enemy tanks and seven anti-tank guns on the first day of battle.

On 8 July, Unterscharführer Franz Staudegger, another Tiger commander, halted for repairs in the town of Teterevino and became separated from his company. He became aware of a nearby Soviet armored counterattack developing and rushed the repairs on his tank to meet the threat. Staudegger and his crew spotted the enemy vanguard and took out seventeen T-34s in two hours. The Russian attack was now faltering, so Staudegger pressed his Tiger forward into the retreating enemy flanks, switching to high-explosive shells after exhausting his armor-piercing ammunition. By day's end, Staudegger's Tiger had destroyed twenty-two T-34s, for which he won the Knight's Cross.

By 9 July, the II SS Panzer Corps had advanced 48 km (30 mi) north and were nearing the small town of Prokhorovka. The LSSAH again took the lead; by now its strength was reduced to just 77 armored vehicles. The 2nd SS Panzergrenadier Regiment, supported by several tanks, advanced up the road to Prokhorovka against heavy resistance. By midday, the infantry had cleared the Komsomolets State Farm and begun the attack on Hill 241.6, which they secured shortly after nightfall on 10 July.

The next day the advance resumed, with the division capturing Oktiabr'skii State Farm and Hill 252.2 in heavy fighting against Soviet paratroopers of the 9th Guards Airborne Division. On 12 July, the Soviets threw the 5th Guards Tank Army into a counterattack near Prokhorovka. Two tank corps faced the LSSAH, hitting the Germans around Oktiabr'skii State Farm and Hill 252.2. In the ensuing fighting, the Germans inflicted heavy casualties on the Soviets. The Soviet counterattack had stalled the German advance, and the division was forced to fall back to Oktiabr'skii. Fighting continued the next day, but the focus of the Soviet attack had then shifted to the Totenkopf, on the left of the LSSAH.

With the battle at Prokhorovka still in the balance, Soviet High Command launched an offensive of their own, Operation Kutuzov, near Orel causing Hitler to order the cessation of Citadel. The II SS Panzer Corps was pulled back. The LSSAH was ordered out of the line, having suffered 2,753 casualties including 474 killed. Eleven tanks were also lost during Citadel. The division was sent to Italy to help stabilize the situation there caused by the deposal of Benito Mussolini by the Badoglio government and the Allied invasion of Sicily which began on the night of 9–10 July 1943. The division left behind its heavy equipment, which was given to Das Reich and Totenkopf.

== Italy and subsequent operations ==
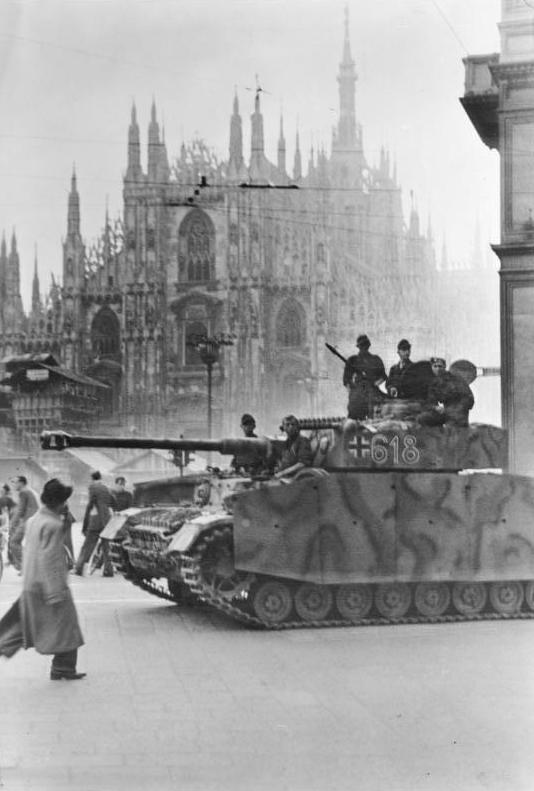
LSSAH Panzer IV Ausf. H in Milan, Italy, September 1943

The division, re-equipped with vehicles, arrived on the Po River Plain on 8 August 1943. The LSSAH was given the task of guarding several vital road and rail junctions in the area of Trento-Verona. After several weeks, the division was moved to the Parma-Reggio area. During this period, the Leibstandarte was involved in several skirmishes with partisans. With Italy having announced an armistice with the Allies of 8 September 1943, the division was ordered to begin disarming nearby Royal Italian Army units. This went smoothly, with the exception of brief, bloody fights with Italian troops stationed in Parma, Cremona and Piacenza on 9 September. By 19 September, all Italian forces in the Po River Plain had been disarmed.

While on rear security duties in Italy, LSSAH men murdered 49 Jewish refugees near Lake Maggiore, in the Lake Maggiore massacres, who had fled there after the German takeover. The murders happened between 15 and 24 September. Some of the victims had their feet and hands tied and were drowned.

The LSSAH was sent to the Istria Peninsula and was engaged in several anti-partisan operations as part of Nazi security warfare. During its period in Italy, the LSSAH was reformed as a full panzer division, and redesignated 1st SS Panzer Division Leibstandarte SS Adolf Hitler. In early November, the division was ordered back to the Eastern Front, arriving in the Zhitomir area in mid-November.

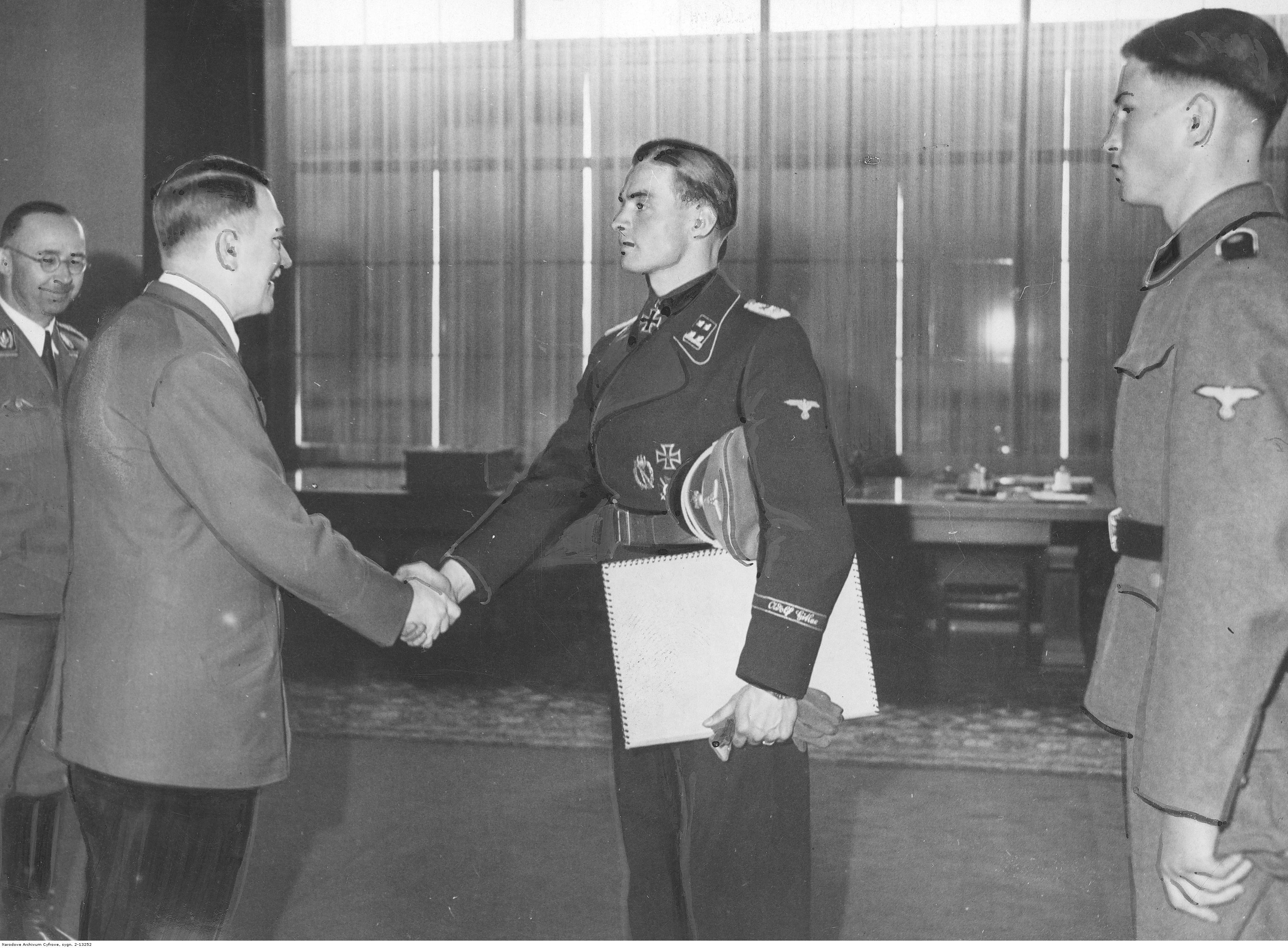
Adolf Hitler receives 2,475,209.88 marks from the hands of Lieutenant Colonel of the SS Panzer Corps "Leibstandarte Adolf Hitler" Max Wuensche. April 1944

The division was assigned to XLVIII Panzer Corps, a part of 4th Panzer Army, which was struggling to hold the line near Zhitomir. The division was transferred to the Cherkassy area at the end of January, where it was assigned to the III Panzer Corps, part of 1st Panzer Army. As part of the corps, the division took part in the relief attempt of German forces of Army Group South encircled in the Korsun Pocket in January–February 1944.

The majority of the LSSAH, which amounted to 41 officers and 1,188 men, were withdrawn to Belgium for rest and refit, however a Kampfgruppe was left behind. On 25 March, the 1st Panzer Army was encircled in the Kamenets-Podolsky pocket. The battle group took part in the fighting to escape the encirclement, forming a part of the spearhead which linked up with the II SS Panzer Corps near Buczacz on 6 April. The LSSAH Division was reformed in Belgium and was at full strength by 25 April 1944.

== Western Front ==
The division was transferred again as part of the I SS Panzer Corps which at this time consisted of the 101 SS Heavy Panzer Battalion, SS Division Hitlerjugend, SS Division Götz von Berlichingen and the Panzer Lehr Division. The LSSAH had been positioned north of the River Seine to counter any possible landing in the area of the Pas de Calais so the first units did not arrive in Normandy until after the Allied invasion there on 6 June 1944; part of it arrived on the night of 27–28 June with the whole division taking another week. By 4 July the I SS Panzer Corps was reformed, and now consisted of the LSSAH and the Hitlerjugend. The first action they were involved in was the defense of Carpiquet village and airfield in the Allied Operation Windsor. There then followed a number of Allied attacks – Operations Charnwood and Jupiter. On 12 July the LSSAH was holding the Caen south sector from Maltot in the west to the Caen – Falaise road in the east. During the night of 14–15 July, LSSAH was relieved by the 272nd Infantry Division and pulled back to an assembly area astride the Caen – Falaise road between Ifs and Cintheaux.

=== Operation Goodwood ===
The front line at the beginning of Operation Spring, showing the layout of forces for both sides

The British Operation Goodwood took place between 18 and 20 July 1944. British VIII Corps, with three armored divisions, launched the attack aiming to seize the German-held Bourguébus Ridge, along with the area between Bretteville-sur-Laize and Vimont. The operation was preceded by a three-hour bombing by 2,500 aircraft. The Division strength prior to Goodwood was reported as 59 Panzer IVs, 46 Panthers and 35 StuG IIIs.

II/1st SS Panzer Regiment, located near Garcelles, received orders to attack the British at Soliers. While moving its 13 Panthers towards Bourguébus, the unit engaged 60 British tanks, destroying 20 of them and capturing Soliers. Around 12:00, the Panther Battalion, I/1st SS Panzer regiment, was engaged in combat with the British 29th Armoured Brigade of the British 11th Armoured Division. The body of the LSSAH was rushed to the front from Falaise, where it was being held in reserve. It counterattacked at 17:00, together with the 21st Panzer Division, and halted the British offensive on the left front.

The British resumed their assault at around 13:00 on 19 July, having brought up reinforcements to continue the attack. They overran some of the forward German units and approached Bourguébus Ridge at 16:00. They came under fire from Panthers of the Leibstandarte, who had taken up positions on the ridge. Reinforcements of the 12th SS Panzer Division arrived at the right flank at around 15:00. The Canadians attacked next in the Battle of Verrières Ridge and Operation Spring (see map), where the LSSAH came up against a number of Allied divisions, including the Guards Armoured Division, 7th Armoured, 2nd and 3rd Canadian Divisions.

=== Operation Lüttich ===
On 25 July 1944, US forces under General Omar Bradley succeeded in breaking through the German defenses as part of Operation Cobra and entered Brittany. Hitler forbade any retreat, and ordered a counteroffensive, codenamed Operation Lüttich, by the XLVII Panzer Corps, consisting of the 2nd Panzer Division, part of the LSSAH, the SS Division Das Reich and the 116th Panzer Division. The plan for the attack was to hit the 30th Infantry Division east of Mortain, then cut through American defenses to reach the coast. The US response was aided by Ultra intelligence, which had revealed the plans for Operation Lüttich by 4 August. As a result, Bradley was able to obtain air support from both the US 9th Air Force and the RAF.

The LSSAH and other divisions went on the attack on 7 August. The 1st SS Panzer Regiment, along with two battalions of motorized infantry, one combat engineer company, and the division's flak battalion, were used for the attack. The weather was not suitable for flying that morning, which disadvantaged the Allies. The SS Division Das Reich recaptured Mortain, and an armored battle group under Joachim Peiper reached Bourlopin, but had to halt due to US counterattacks and air strikes.

The much-reduced division was encircled in the Falaise pocket by US, Canadian, and Polish forces. Some LSSAH units broke out of the pocket on 22 August, leaving behind all their tanks and artillery. The division sustained 5,000 casualties during the Normandy campaign. During their retreat from France, members of the LSSAH and the SS Division Hitlerjugend division murdered 34 French civilians in the towns of Tavaux and Plomion.

=== Ardennes Offensive ===
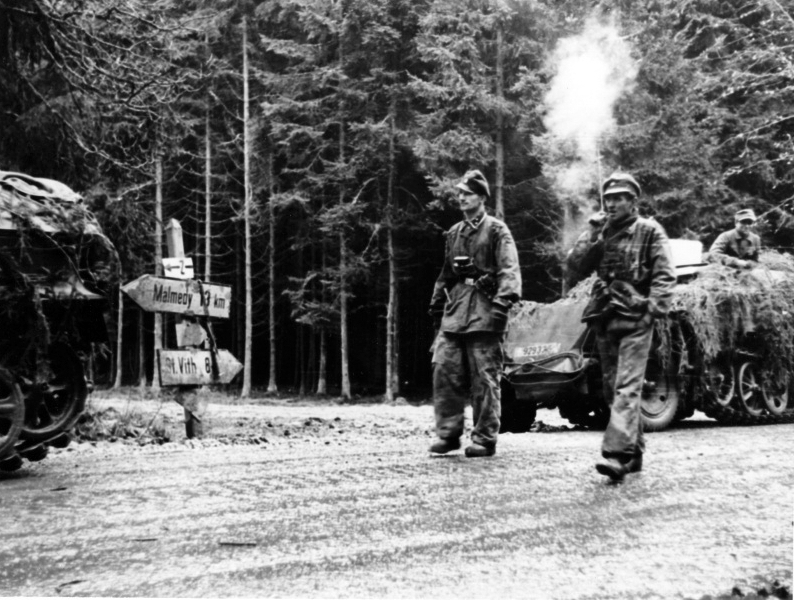
Kampfgruppe Knittel's troops on the road to Stavelot to support Peiper

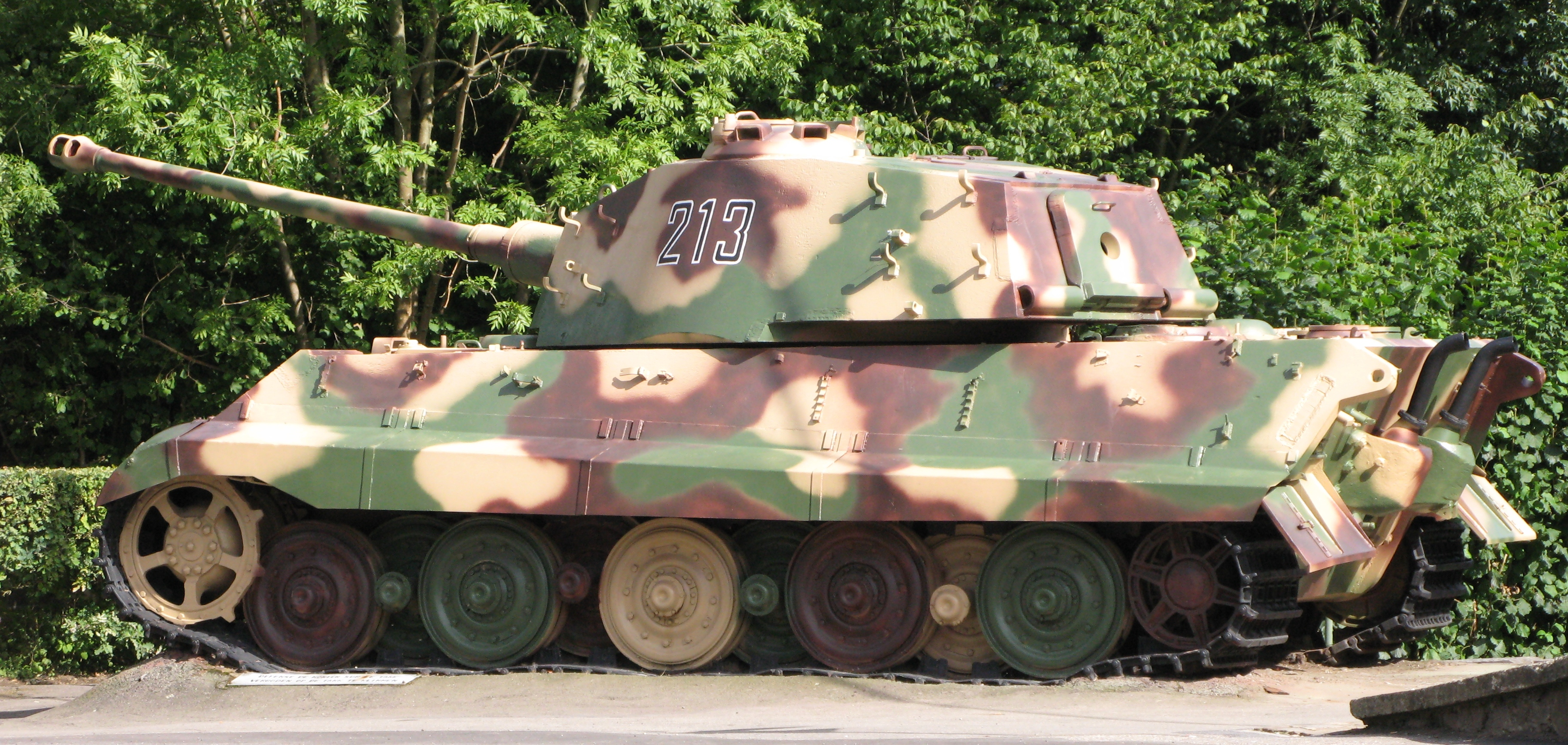
A preserved Tiger II tank left by Kampfgruppe Peiper at La Gleize in December 1944

The Ardennes Offensive (16 December 1944 – 25 January 1945) was a major German offensive launched through the forested Ardennes Mountains region of Belgium, France and Luxembourg. The offensive was called Unternehmen Wacht am Rhein (Operation "Watch on the Rhine") by the Germans. The "bulge" was the initial incursion the Germans put into the Allies' line of advance, as seen in maps presented in contemporary newspapers.

Wilhelm Mohnke, now in command of the LSSAH, attached to the I SS Panzer Corps, was the spearhead of the operation. The fuel crisis in Nazi Germany meant that the LSSAH had insufficient amounts of fuel for its vehicles. On 16 December the operation began, with then SS-Obersturmbannführer Joachim Peiper's Kampfgruppe leading the push to the Meuse.

=== Malmedy massacre ===
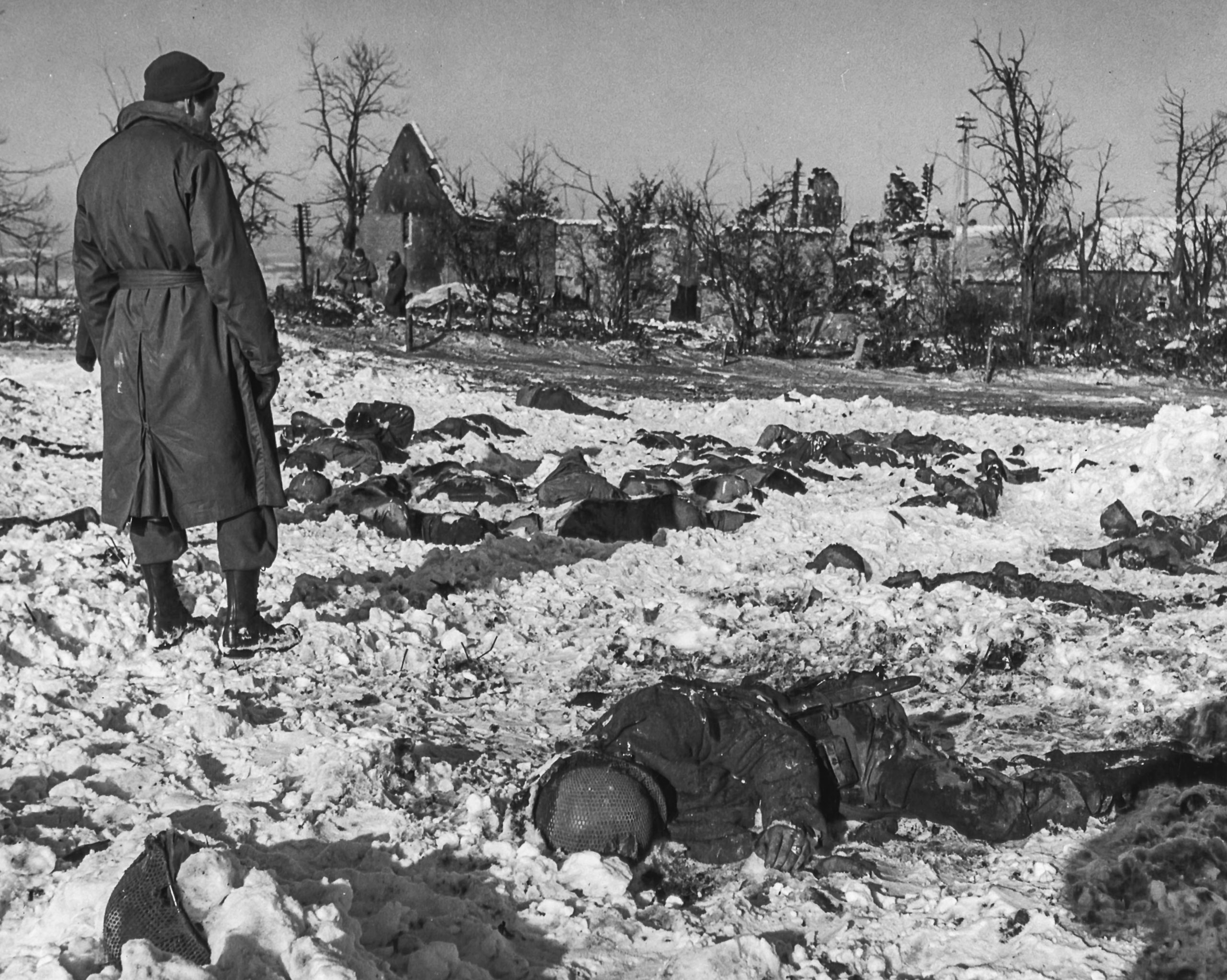
A GI surveys the scene of the Malmedy massacre. The victims' bodies were preserved under the snow until Allied forces recaptured the area in January 1945.

Peiper was supposed to reach the Meuse River on the first day of the offensive. Instead, he was delayed by almost an entire day by a recon platoon at Lanzerath Ridge. Then, unable to dislodge the 99th Infantry Division from Elsenborn Ridge, he diverted to an alternative road to the south. At 07:00 on 17 December, the unit seized a US fuel depot at Büllingen, and refueled before continuing westward. At 12:30, near the hamlet of Baugnez, on the height halfway between the town of Malmedy and Ligneuville, Peiper's Kampfgruppe encountered a convoy of the 285th Field Artillery Observation Battalion, US 7th Armored Division.

After a brief battle the Americans surrendered. Along with other Americans captured earlier (127 men total), they were disarmed and sent to stand in a field near the crossroads, where the Germans shot them en masse with machine guns and pistols. Of the 84 men killed, 41 were killed by a pistol shot to the head at close range and six were killed by having their skulls bashed in. After feigning death in the field for several hours while the Germans moved among them shooting survivors, a group of about 30 men escaped. Researcher Danny S. Parker believe that Peiper or one of his subordinates made the decision to kill the prisoners. There is no record of an SS officer giving an execution order. News of the killings raced through the Allied lines. Captured SS men who were part of Kampfgruppe Peiper were tried during the Malmedy massacre trial following the war for this massacre and several others in the area. Many of the perpetrators were sentenced to hang, but the sentences were commuted. Peiper himself was imprisoned for eleven years for his role in the killings.

Peiper entered Stavelot on 18 December but encountered fierce resistance from the American defenders. Unable to defeat them, he left a smaller support force in town and headed for the bridge at Trois-Ponts with the bulk of his strength, but by the time he reached it, retreating US engineers had already destroyed it. Peiper then headed for the village of La Gleize and from there on to Stoumont. There, as Peiper approached, engineers blew up the bridge. US defenders were entrenched and ready. Peiper's men were cut off from the main German force and supplies when the Americans recaptured the poorly defended Stavelot on 19 December. As their situation in Stoumont was becoming hopeless, Peiper decided to pull back to La Gleize where he set up his defenses, waiting for the German relief force. Since no such force was able to penetrate the US line, Peiper decided to break out back to the German lines on 23 December. The men of the Kampfgruppe abandoned their vehicles and heavy equipment, although most of the men were able to escape.

With each passing day, enemy resistance stiffened and the advance was eventually halted on all fronts. The German High Command ordered that a renewed attack begin on 1 January 1945. Yet by this time, the Allies had regrouped their forces and were ready to repulse any attack launched by the Germans. The operation formally ended on 27 January 1945, and three days later Mohnke was promoted to SS-Brigadeführer. LSSAH and the I SS Panzer Corps were then transferred to Hungary to bolster the crumbling situation there. Mohnke was wounded in an air raid. In his place, SS-Brigadeführer Otto Kumm was appointed the new Division Commander as of 15 February 1945.

==== Killing of Wereth 11 ====
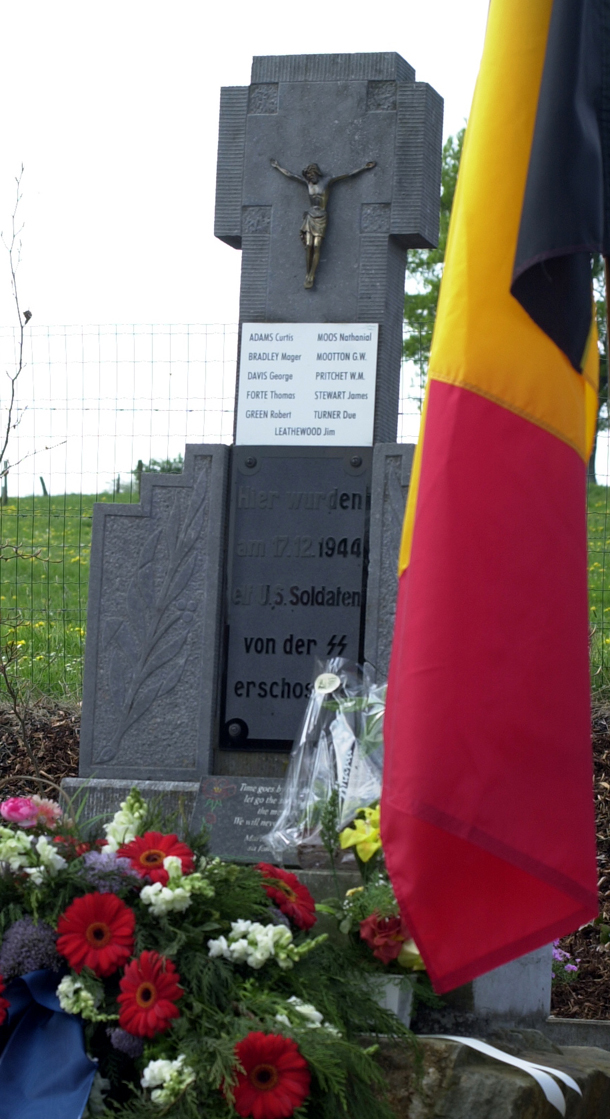
Memorial to the Wereth 11

During the Battle of the Bulge, troops from 3./SS-PzAA1 LSSAH captured eleven African-American soldiers from the 333rd Artillery Battalion in the hamlet of Wereth. Subsequently the prisoners were shot and their remains found by Allied troops two months later. The soldiers had their fingers cut off, legs broken, and at least one was shot while trying to bandage a comrade's wounds.

== Eastern Front 1945 ==
=== Operation Spring Awakening ===
Operation Spring Awakening (6 March 1945 – 16 March 1945) was the last major German offensive launched during World War II. It began in great secrecy on 6 March 1945. The German forces launched attacks in Hungary near Lake Balaton. This area included some of the last oil reserves still available to the Axis. The operation involved many German units withdrawn from the failed Ardennes Offensive on the Western Front, including the 6th SS Panzer Army and the LSSAH. Operation Spring Awakening was a failure for the German side. Within a week, the early gains were halted by massive counter-attacks by Soviet forces. The overwhelming numerical superiority of the Red Army made any defense impossible, yet Hitler somehow had believed victory was attainable.

After the failure of Operation Spring Awakening, Sepp Dietrich's 6th SS Panzer Army retreated in stages to the Vienna area. The Germans prepared defensive positions in an attempt to hold the city against the fast arriving Red Army, in what become known as the Vienna Offensive. The Germans could not hold Vienna, which fell to the Soviet forces on 13 April.

This defeat resulted in the Ärmelstreifen (Cuff Titles Order) or "armband order", which was issued by Hitler to the commander of the 6th SS Panzer Army, Sepp Dietrich. Hitler claimed that the troops "did not fight as the situation demanded." As a mark of disgrace, Hitler ordered the Waffen-SS units involved to remove their cuff titles (German: Ärmelstreifen). Dietrich refused to carry out the order and did not relay the message to the troops. According to Heinz Guderian, most cuff titles had already been removed; he later wrote that the removal of unit cuffs from the Leibstandarte, Totenkopf, Hohenstaufen, and the Das Reich Divisions was accomplished for security reasons.

=== Battle of Berlin ===
U.S. flag raised over Berlin at the Leibstandarte barracks on 4 July 1945; Soviet honor guard in foreground

Part of the LSSAH ended the war fighting in Berlin. On 23 April 1945, Hitler appointed Brigadeführer Mohnke the commander for the central government district (Zitadelle sector) that included the Reich Chancellery and Führerbunker. Mohnke's command post was under the Reich Chancellery in the bunkers therein. He formed Kampfgruppe Mohnke which was divided into two weak regiments made up of approximately 2,000 men. The core group were the 800 of the Leibstandarte Guard Battalion (assigned to guard the Führer). After Hitler's suicide, they received orders to break out. Prior to the attempt, Mohnke briefed all commanders who could be reached within the Zitadelle sector about Hitler's death and the planned break out. It started at 2300 hours on 1 May. Mohnke led the first of ten small groups. Several very small groups managed to reach the Americans at the Elbe's west bank, but most, including Mohnke's group, could not get through the Soviet lines. Many were taken prisoner and some committed suicide. On 2 May hostilities officially ended by order of Helmuth Weidling, Commandant of the Berlin Defense Area.

After Vienna was captured, the LSSAH had fewer than 1,600 men and 16 tanks. Apart from the remains of Berlin Guard Battalion, the LSSAH surrendered to US forces in the Steyr area on 8 May 1945. On 4 July (Independence Day) 1945, the United States flag was raised over Berlin for the first time at the Leibstandarte barracks.

== Organisation ==
Structure of the division:

- Headquarters
- 1st SS Panzer Reconnaissance Battalion
- 1st SS Panzer Regiment
- 1st SS Panzergrenadier Regiment
- 2nd SS Panzergrenadier Regiment
- 1st SS Panzer Engineer Battalion
- 1st SS Panzer Artillery Regiment
- 1st SS Panzer Assault Gun Regiment
- 1st SS Panzer Tank Destroyer Battalion
- 1st SS Panzer Anti-Aircraft Battalion
- 1st SS Rocket Launcher Battalion (added September 1944)
- 1st SS Panzer Signal Battalion
- 1st SS Panzer Divisional Supply Group

== Commanders ==
No.	Portrait	Commander	Took office	Left office	Time in office
1	Sepp Dietrich	SS-Oberst-Gruppenführer; Sepp Dietrich (1892–1966)	15 August 1938	4 July 1943	4 years, 323 days
2	Theodor Wisch	SS-Brigadeführer; Theodor Wisch (1907–1995)	4 July 1943	20 August 1944	1 year, 47 days
3	Wilhelm Mohnke	SS-Brigadeführer; Wilhelm Mohnke (1911–2001)	20 August 1944	6 February 1945	170 days
4	Otto Kumm	SS-Brigadeführer; Otto Kumm (1909–2004)	6 February 1945	8 May 1945	91 days

== Notable members ==
- Otto Beisheim − industrialist
- Otto Günsche
- Klaus Havenstein − actor
- Karl Wilhelm Krause
- Kurt Meyer
- Rochus Misch
- Joachim Peiper
- Franz Schönhuber − politician
- Bernhard Siebken
- Michael Wittmann
- Max Wünsche

== See also ==
- I SS Panzer Corps "Leibstandarte SS Adolf Hitler"
- 101st Heavy SS Panzer Battalion
- Leibstandarte SS Adolf Hitler Order of Battle
- List of German divisions in World War II
- List of Waffen-SS divisions
- List of SS personnel
- SS Panzer Division order of battle
- SS Brigade Schuldt
- Boves massacre
