= Theodor Wisch =

Waffen-SS commander (1907–1995)

- Born: 13 December 1907; Wesselburenerkoog
- Died: 11 January 1995 (aged 87)
- Military career
- Allegiance: Nazi Germany
- Branch: Waffen-SS
- Service years: 1933–1945
- Rank: SS-Brigadeführer and Generalmajor of the Waffen-SS
- Commands: 1st SS Panzer Division Leibstandarte SS Adolf Hitler
- Conflicts: World War II
- Awards: Knight's Cross of the Iron Cross with Oak Leaves and Swords

Theodor Peter Johann Wisch (13 December 1907 – 11 January 1995) was a high-ranking member of the Waffen-SS of Nazi Germany during World War II. He was a commander of the SS Division Leibstandarte (LSSAH) and a recipient of the Knight's Cross of the Iron Cross with Oak Leaves and Swords. He assumed command of the LSSAH in April 1943. He was seriously wounded in combat on the Western Front by a naval artillery barrage in the Falaise Pocket on 20 August 1944, and replaced as division commander by SS-Brigadeführer Wilhelm Mohnke.

== Awards ==
- Iron Cross (1939) 2nd Class (24 September 1939) & 1st Class (8 November 1939)
- German Cross in Gold on 25 February 1943 as SS-Standartenführer in the 2. Panzergrenadier-Regiment SS-Panzergrenadier-Division "Leibstandarte SS Adolf Hitler"
- Knight's Cross of the Iron Cross with Oak Leaves and Swords
  - Knight's Cross on 15 September 1941 as SS-Sturmbannführer and commander of the II./LSSAH
  - 393rd Oak Leaves on 12 February 1944 as SS-Brigadeführer and commander of the LSSAH
  - 94th Swords on 30 August 1944 as SS-Brigadeführer and Generalmajor of the Waffen-SS, and commander of the LSSAH

== See also ==
- List SS-Brigadeführer

Military offices
| Preceded by SS-Oberstgruppenführer Josef Dietrich | Commander of 1st SS Division Leibstandarte SS Adolf Hitler; 7 April 1943 – 20 August 1944 | Succeeded by SS-Brigadeführer Wilhelm Mohnke |
