= Battle of the Bulge =

World War II battle, 1944–1945

- Part of the Western Front of World War II
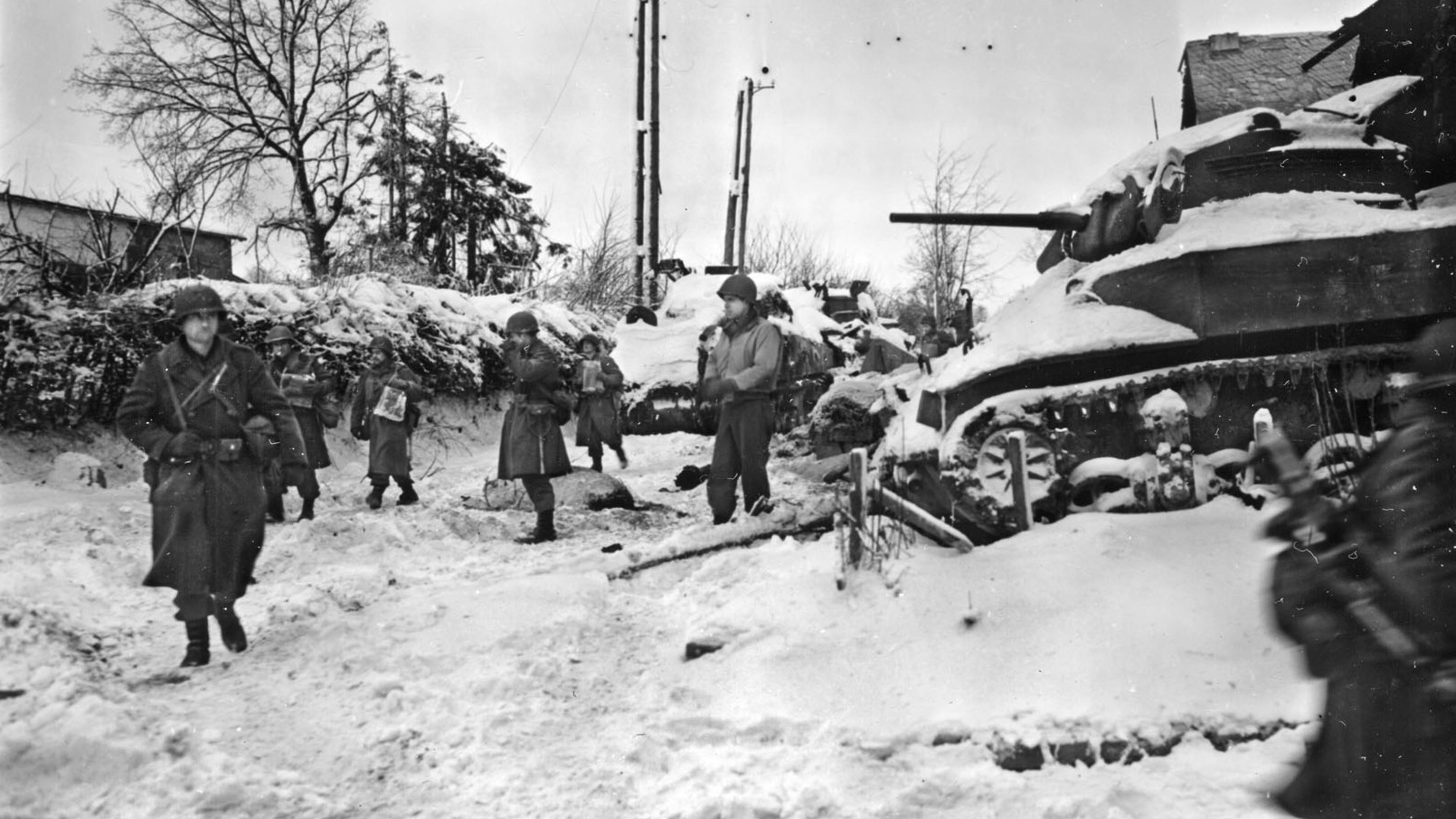
- American soldiers of the 117th Infantry Regiment, Tennessee National Guard, part of the 30th Infantry Division, move past a destroyed American M5A1 "Stuart" tank on their advance to recapture the town of St. Vith during the Battle of the Bulge, January 1945.
| Date | 16 December 1944 – 28 January 1945 (1 month, 1 week and 5 days) |
| Location | The Ardennes: Belgium, Luxembourg, Germany 50°0′15″N 5°43′12″E |
| Result | Allied victory |

Belligerents
| United States; United Kingdom; France; Canada; Belgium | Germany |

Commanders and leaders
| SHAEF: (United States) Dwight D. Eisenhower; 21st Army Group: (United Kingdom) Bernard Montgomery; (United Kingdom) Brian Horrocks; 12th Army Group: (United States) Omar Bradley; (United States) Courtney Hodges; (United States) George S. Patton; Allied Air Forces: (United States) Carl Spaatz; (United States) Jimmy Doolittle; (United States) Hoyt Vandenberg; Arthur Coningham | OB West: (Nazi Germany) Gerd von Rundstedt; Army Group B: (Nazi Germany) Walter Model; (Nazi Germany) Sepp Dietrich; (Nazi Germany) Hasso von Manteuffel; (Nazi Germany) Erich Brandenberger; Luftwaffe: (Nazi Germany) Dietrich Peltz; (Nazi Germany) Wolfgang Pickert |

Units involved
| (United States) 12th Army Group: First Army (under 21st Army Group 20 December – 16 January); Third Army; (United Kingdom) 21st Army Group (United States) USSTAF: US Eighth Air Force; US Ninth Air Force; (United Kingdom) RAF: Second Tactical Air Force | (Nazi Germany) Army Group B: 5th Panzer Army; 6th Panzer Army; 7th Army; III Flak Corps; (Nazi Germany) Air Command West: II Fighter Corps |

Strength
| 16 December: (Note: Includes complete headquarters and attachment strength for First Army, V Corps, and VIII Corps, and the complete strength of the 78th, 99th, 106th, 28th, and 4th Infantry Divisions and 7th & 9th Armored Divisions. Due to the accounting method employed in "Hitler's Last Gamble," this does not strictly reflect the extent of the forces in contact with each other on 16 December; accuracy is considerably improved for the later periods.): 228,741 men; 483 tanks; 499 tank destroyers and assault guns (Note: For Allied forces, Dupuy counts light tanks with tank destroyers.); 1,921 other armored fighting vehicles (AFVs); 971 anti-tank and artillery pieces; 6 infantry divisions; 2 armored divisions; 24 December: c. 541,000 men; 1,616 tanks; 1,713 tank destroyers and assault guns; 5,352 other AFVs; 2,408 anti-tank and artillery pieces; 15 infantry divisions; 6 armored divisions; 1 armored brigade; 2 January: c. 705,000 men; 2,409 tanks; 1,970 tank destroyers and assault guns; 7,769 other AFVs; 3,305 anti-tank and artillery pieces; 22 infantry divisions; 8 armored divisions; 2 armored brigades; 16 January: 700,520 men; 2,428 tanks; 1,912 tank destroyers and assault guns; 7,079 other AFVs; 3,181 anti-tank and artillery pieces; 22 infantry divisions; 8 armored divisions; 2 armored brigades | 16 December: 406,342 men; 557 tanks; 667 tank destroyers and assault guns; 1,261 other AFVs; 4,224 anti-tank and artillery pieces; 13 infantry divisions (Note: Includes two parachute divisions); 7 armored divisions; 1 armored brigade; 24 December: c. 449,000 men; 423 tanks; 608 tank destroyers and assault guns; 1,496 other AFVs; 4,131 anti-tank and artillery pieces; 16 infantry divisions; 8 armored divisions; 3 armored brigades; 2 January: c. 401,000 men; 287 tanks; 462 tank destroyers and assault guns; 1,090 other AFVs; 3,396 anti-tank and artillery pieces; 15 infantry divisions; 8 armored divisions; 3 armored brigades; 16 January: 383,016 men; 216 tanks; 414 tank destroyers and assault guns; 907 other AFVs; 3,256 anti-tank and artillery pieces; 16 infantry divisions; 8 armored divisions; 2 armored brigades |

Casualties and losses
| (United States) American: 81,000 casualties (8,407 killed, 46,170 wounded and 20,905 missing); 800 tanks destroyed; c. 1,000 aircraft lost, over 647 in December and 353 during Operation Bodenplatte; (United Kingdom) British: 1,408–1,462+ (Note: Ellis and Warhurst cite 200 killed, 969 wounded, and 239 missing; Dupuy, Bongard, and Anderson provide higher figures of 222 killed, 977 wounded, and 263 missing among line combat units from 16 December 1944 to 16 January 1945, inclusive.) | (Nazi Germany) German: 63,000~ (Note: 10,749 dead; 34,225 wounded; 22,487 captured) to 75,000+ casualties; (U.S. Estimate: 103,900 (Note: Pogue cites Allied estimates in excess of 24,000 killed and 16,000 prisoners.) casualties): 527–554 tanks, tank destroyers and assault guns lost; c. 800 aircraft lost, at least 500 in December and 280 during Operation Bodenplatte |
- Approximately 3,000 civilians killed.

Map showing the swelling of "the Bulge" as the German offensive progressed creating the nose-like salient during 16–25 December 1944. Front line, 16 December Front line, 20 December Front line, 25 December Allied movements German movements

The Battle of the Bulge, also known as the Ardennes Offensive and referred to by the Germans as Unternehmen Wacht am Rhein (transl. Operation Watch on the Rhine), was an offensive campaign on the Western Front during the Second World War, taking place from 16 December 1944 to 25 January 1945. It was launched through the densely forested Ardennes region of eastern Belgium and northern Luxembourg and was intended to stop Allied use of the Belgian port of Antwerp and to split the Allied lines, allowing the Germans to encircle and destroy each of the four Allied armies and force the western Allies to negotiate a peace treaty in the Axis powers' favor.

The Germans achieved total surprise in their attack on the morning of 16 December 1944, due to a combination of Allied overconfidence based on the favorable defensive terrain and faulty intelligence about Wehrmacht intentions, poor aerial reconnaissance due to bad weather, and a preoccupation with Allied offensive plans elsewhere. American forces were using this region primarily as a rest area for the U.S. First Army, and the lines were thinly held by fatigued troops and inexperienced replacement units. The Germans also took advantage of heavy clouds that grounded the Allies' superior air forces for an extended period. American resistance on the northern shoulder of the offensive, around Elsenborn Ridge, and in the south, around Bastogne, blocked German access to key roads to the northwest and west which they had counted on for success. This congestion and terrain that favored the defenders threw the German advance behind schedule and allowed the Allies to reinforce the thinly placed troops. The farthest west the offensive reached was the village of Foy-Notre-Dame, south east of Dinant, where they were stopped by the U.S. 2nd Armored Division on 24 December 1944.

Better weather on and after 24 December permitted air attacks on German forces and supply lines. On 26 December the lead element of General George S. Patton's U.S. Third Army reached Bastogne from the south, ending the siege. Although the offensive was effectively broken by 27 December, when the trapped units of 2nd Panzer Division twice tried to break out with only partial success, the battle continued for another month before the front line was effectively restored to its pre-attack position.

The Germans committed over 410,000 men, just over 1,400 tanks and armored fighting vehicles, 2,600 artillery pieces, and over 1,000 combat aircraft. Between 63,000 and 104,000 of these men were killed, missing, wounded in action, or captured. The battle severely depleted Germany's armored forces, which remained largely unreplaced throughout the remainder of the war. German Luftwaffe personnel, and later also Luftwaffe aircraft (in the concluding stages of the engagement) also sustained heavy losses. After the defeat, many experienced German units were effectively out of men and equipment, and the survivors retreated to the Siegfried Line.

Allied forces eventually numbered more than 700,000 men; their casualties are estimated at 77,000 to more than 83,000, including at least 8,600 killed. The "Bulge" was the largest and bloodiest single battle fought by the United States in World War II. It was one of the most important battles of the war, as it marked the last major offensive attempted by the Axis powers on the Western Front. After this defeat, Nazi forces would only retreat for the remainder of the war.

== Background ==
After the breakout from Normandy at the end of July 1944 and the Allied landings in southern France on 15 August 1944, the Allies advanced towards Germany more quickly than anticipated. The speed of the advance of the Allies caused several military logistics issues:

- Troops were fatigued by weeks of continuous combat and rapid movement.
- Supply lines were stretched extremely thin.
- Supplies were dangerously depleted.

By December 1944, General Dwight D. Eisenhower (the Supreme Allied Commander on the Western Front) and his staff decided to hold the Ardennes region primarily as a rest area for the U.S. First Army, with limited Allied operational objectives in the area.

The Allies defended the Ardennes line very thinly, due to the favorable defensive terrain (a densely wooded highland with deep river valleys and a rather thin road network) and because they had intelligence that the Wehrmacht was using the area across the German border as a rest-and-refit area for its own troops.

=== Allied supply issues ===
The Allies faced major supply issues, due to the rate of their advance coupled with the initial lack of deep-water ports. Over-the-beach supply operations using the Normandy landing areas, and direct landing ships on the beaches, were unable to meet operational needs. The only deep-water port the Allies had captured was Cherbourg on the northern shore of the Cotentin peninsula and west of the original invasion beaches, but the Germans had thoroughly wrecked and mined the harbor before it could be taken. It took many months to rebuild its cargo-handling capability. The Allies captured the port of Antwerp intact in the first days of September, but it was not operational until 28 November. The estuary of the Schelde river that controlled access to the port had to be cleared of both German troops and naval mines. These limitations led to differences between General Eisenhower and Field Marshal Bernard Montgomery, commander of the Anglo-Canadian 21st Army Group, over whether Montgomery or Lieutenant General Omar Bradley, commanding the U.S. 12th Army Group, in the south would get priority access to supplies. German forces remained in control of several major ports on the English Channel coast into the autumn, while Dunkirk remained under siege until the end of the war in May 1945.

The Allies' efforts to destroy the French railway system prior to D-Day were successful. This destruction hampered the German response to the invasion, but it proved equally hampering to the Allies, as it took time to repair the rail network's tracks and bridges. A trucking system nicknamed the Red Ball Express brought supplies to front-line troops, but used up five times as much fuel to reach the front line near the Belgian border. By early October, the Allies had suspended major offensives to improve their supply lines and supply availability at the front.

Montgomery and Bradley both pressed for priority delivery of supplies to their respective armies so they could continue their individual lines of advance and maintain pressure on the Germans, while Eisenhower preferred a broad-front strategy. He gave some priority to Montgomery's northern forces. This had the short-term goal of opening the urgently needed port of Antwerp and the long-term goal of capturing the Ruhr area, the biggest industrial area of Germany. With the Allies stalled, German Generalfeldmarschall ('Field Marshal') Gerd von Rundstedt was able to reorganize the disrupted German armies into a coherent defensive force.

Field Marshal Montgomery's Operation Market Garden had achieved only some of its objectives, while its territorial gains left the Allied supply situation stretched further than before. In October, the First Canadian Army fought the Battle of the Scheldt, opening the port of Antwerp to shipping. As a result, by the end of October, the supply situation had eased somewhat.

=== German plans ===
Despite a lull along the front after the Scheldt battles, the German situation remained dire. While operations continued in the autumn, notably the Lorraine Campaign, the Battle of Aachen and fighting in the Hürtgen Forest, the strategic situation in the west had changed little. The Allies were slowly pushing towards Germany, but no breakthrough was achieved. There were 96 Allied divisions at or near the front, with an estimated ten more divisions on the way from the United Kingdom. Additional Allied airborne units remained in England. The Germans could field a total of 55 understrength divisions.

Adolf Hitler first outlined his planned counter-offensive to his generals on 16 September 1944. The goal was to pierce the thinly held lines of the U.S. First Army between Monschau and Wasserbillig with Generalfeldmarschall Walter Model's Army Group B by the end of the first day, get the armor through the Ardennes by the end of the second day, reach the Meuse between Liège and Dinant by the third day, and seize Antwerp and the western bank of the Scheldt estuary by the fourth day.

Hitler initially promised his generals a total of 18 infantry and 12 armored or mechanized divisions "for planning purposes." The plan was to pull 13 infantry divisions, two parachute divisions and six armored divisions from the Oberkommando der Wehrmacht strategic reserve.

On the Eastern Front, the Soviet Operation Bagration during the summer had destroyed much of Germany's Army Group Center. By November, it was clear that Soviet forces were preparing for a winter offensive.

The Allied air offensive of early 1944 had grounded the Luftwaffe, leaving the German Army with little battlefield intelligence and no way to interdict Allied supplies. The converse was equally damaging; daytime movement of German forces was rapidly noticed, and attacks on supplies combined with the bombing of the Romanian oil fields starved Germany of oil and gasoline. This fuel shortage intensified after the Red Army overran those fields in the course of its Second Jassy–Kishinev Offensive in August 1944.

One of the few advantages held by the German forces in November 1944 was that they were no longer defending all of Western Europe. Their front lines in the west had been considerably shortened by the Allied offensive and were much closer to the German heartland. This drastically reduced their supply problems despite Allied control of the air. The extensive telephone and telegraph network meant that radios were no longer necessary for communications, which lessened the effectiveness of Allied Ultra intercepts. Some 40–50 messages per day were decrypted by Ultra. They recorded the quadrupling of German fighter forces, and a term used in an intercepted Luftwaffe message (Jägeraufmarsch, literally, 'Fighter Deployment') implied preparation for an offensive operation. Ultra also picked up communiqués regarding extensive rail and road movements in the region, as well as orders that movements should be made on time.

=== Drafting the offensive ===
Hitler felt that his mobile reserves allowed him to mount one offensive. Although he realized nothing significant could be accomplished in the Eastern Front, he still believed an offensive against the Western Allies, whom he considered militarily inferior to the Red Army, would have some chances of success. Hitler believed he could split the Allied forces and compel the Americans and British to settle for a separate peace, independent of the Soviet Union. Success in the west would give the Germans time to design and produce more advanced weapons (such as jet aircraft, new U-boat designs and super-heavy tanks) and permit the concentration of forces in the east. After the war ended, this assessment was generally viewed as unrealistic, given Allied air superiority throughout Europe and their ability continually to disrupt German offensive operations.

Hitler's plan called for a Blitzkrieg attack through the weakly defended Ardennes, mirroring the successful German offensive there during the Battle of France in 1940, and aimed at splitting the armies along the U.S.-British lines and capturing Antwerp. The plan banked on unfavorable weather, including thick fog and low-lying clouds, which would minimize the Allied air advantage. Hitler originally set the offensive for late November, before the anticipated start of the Soviet Vistula–Oder offensive. The disputes between Montgomery and Bradley were well known, and Hitler hoped he could exploit this disunity. If the attack were to succeed in capturing Antwerp, four armies would be trapped without supplies behind German lines.

Several senior German military officers, including Generalfeldmarschalls Model and von Rundstedt, expressed concern as to whether the goals of the offensive could be realized. Model and von Rundstedt both believed aiming for Antwerp was too ambitious, given Germany's scarce resources in late 1944. At the same time, they felt that maintaining a purely defensive posture (as had been the case since Normandy) would only delay defeat, not avert it. They thus developed alternative, less ambitious plans that did not aim to cross the Meuse River (in German and Dutch: Maas); Model's being Unternehmen Herbstnebel (Operation Autumn Mist) and von Rundstedt's Fall Martin (Plan Martin). The two field marshals combined their plans to present a joint "small solution" to Hitler. (Note: The Ardennes offensive was also named Rundstedt-Offensive, but von Rundstedt strongly objected "to the fact that this stupid operation in the Ardennes is sometimes called the Rundstedt-Offensive. This is a complete misnomer. I had nothing to do with it. It came to me as an order complete to the last detail. Hitler had even written on the plan in his own handwriting 'not to be altered'".) (Note: Wacht am Rhein was renamed Herbstnebel after the operation was agreed in early December, although its original name remains much better known.) When they offered their alternative plans, Hitler would not listen. Rundstedt later testified that while he recognized the merit of Hitler's operational plan, he saw from the very first that "all, absolutely all conditions for the possible success of such an offensive were lacking."

Model, commander of German Army Group B (Heeresgruppe B), and von Rundstedt, overall commander of the German Army Command in the West (OB West), were put in charge of carrying out the operation. The positions of the Allied armies stretched from southern France all the way north to the Netherlands. German planning for the counteroffensive rested on the premise that an attack against thinly manned stretches of the line would halt Allied advances on the Western Front.

=== Operation names ===
The Wehrmacht's code name for the offensive was Unternehmen Wacht am Rhein ('Operation Watch on the Rhine'), after the German patriotic hymn Die Wacht am Rhein, a name that deceptively implied the Germans would be adopting a defensive posture along the Western Front. The Germans also referred to it as Ardennenoffensive ('Ardennes Offensive') and Rundstedt-Offensive, both names being generally used nowadays in modern Germany. The French (and Belgian) name for the operation is Bataille des Ardennes, 'Battle of the Ardennes'. The battle was militarily defined by the Allies as the Ardennes Counteroffensive, which included the German drive and the American effort to contain and later defeat it. The phrase 'Battle of the Bulge' was coined by contemporary press to describe the way the Allied front line bulged inward on wartime news maps.

While the Ardennes Counteroffensive is the correct term in Allied military language, the official Ardennes-Alsace campaign reached beyond the Ardennes battle region, and the most popular description in English speaking countries remains simply 'Battle of the Bulge'.

=== Planning ===
There is a popular impression that the chief trouble in the Ardennes is the lack of good roads. As anyone on the ground will agree, the Ardennes has a fairly good road system. It is not the lack of roads as much as the lack of almost anything else on which to move that matters.

— Theodore Draper

The OKW decided by mid-September, at Hitler's insistence, that the offensive would be mounted in the Ardennes, as was done in 1940. In 1940 German forces had passed through the Ardennes in three days before engaging the enemy, but the 1944 plan called for battle in the forest itself. The main forces were to advance westward to the Meuse River, then turn northwest for Antwerp and Brussels. The close terrain of the Ardennes would make rapid movement difficult, though open ground beyond the Meuse offered the prospect of a successful dash to the coast.

Four armies were selected for the operation. Adolf Hitler personally selected for the counter-offensive on the northern shoulder of the Western Front the best troops available and officers he trusted. The lead role in the attack was given to the 6th Panzer Army, commanded by SS Oberstgruppenführer Sepp Dietrich. It included the most experienced formation of the Waffen-SS: the 1st SS Panzer Division Leibstandarte SS Adolf Hitler. It also contained the 12th SS Panzer Division Hitlerjugend. They were given priority for supply and equipment and assigned the shortest route to the primary objective of the offensive, Antwerp, starting from the northernmost point on the intended battlefront, nearest the important road network hub of Monschau.

The Fifth Panzer Army under General Hasso von Manteuffel was assigned to the middle sector with the objective of capturing Brussels. The Seventh Army, under General Erich Brandenberger, was assigned to the southernmost sector, near the Luxembourgish city of Echternach, with the task of protecting the flank. This Army was made up of only four infantry divisions, with no large-scale armored formations to use as a spearhead unit. As a result, they made little progress throughout the battle.

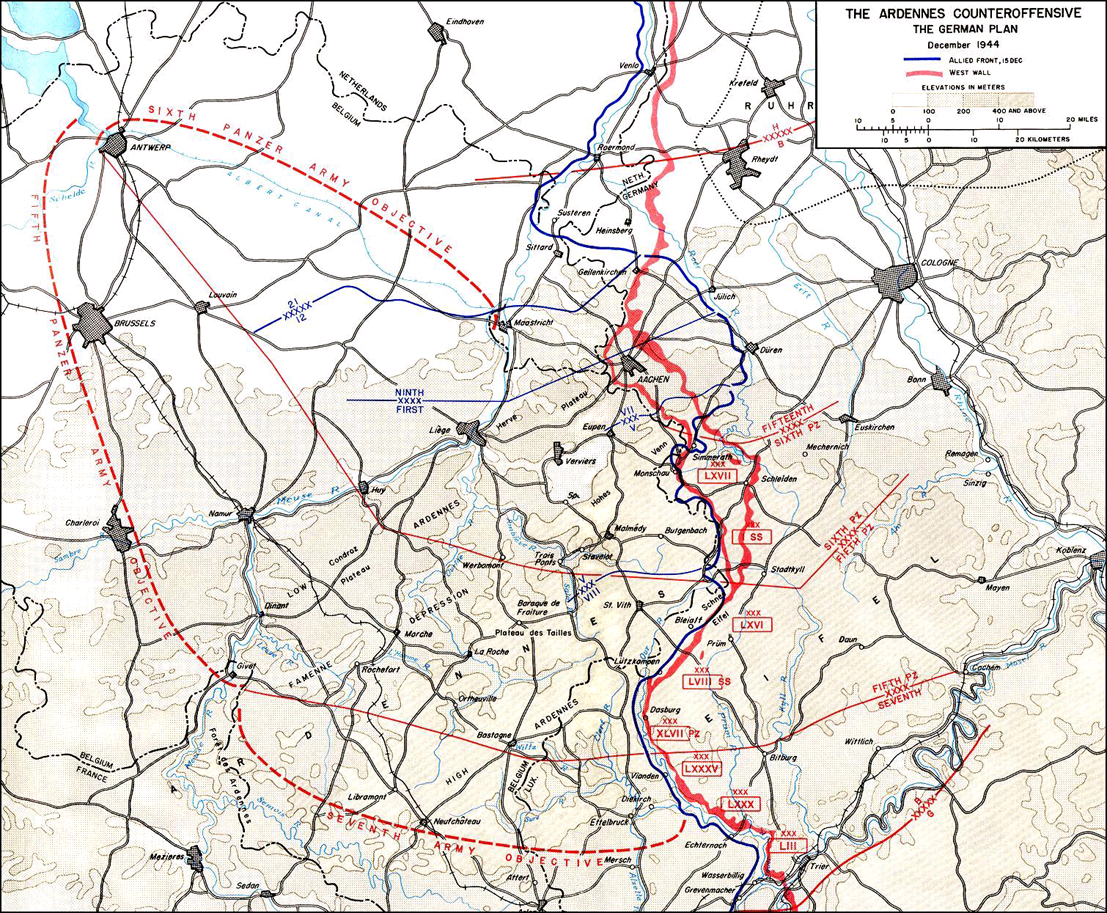
The German plan

In an indirect, secondary role, the Fifteenth Army, under General Gustav-Adolf von Zangen, recently brought back up to strength and re-equipped after heavy fighting during Operation Market Garden, was located just north of the Ardennes battlefield and tasked with holding U.S. forces in place, with the possibility of launching its own attack given favorable conditions.

For the offensive to be successful, four criteria were deemed critical: the attack had to be a complete surprise; the weather conditions had to be poor to neutralize Allied air superiority and the damage it could inflict on the German offensive and its supply lines; the progress had to be rapid—the Meuse River, halfway to Antwerp, had to be reached by day 4; and Allied fuel supplies would have to be captured intact along the way because the combined Wehrmacht forces were short on fuel. The General Staff estimated they only had enough fuel to cover one third to one half of the ground to Antwerp in heavy combat conditions.

The plan originally called for just under 45 divisions, including a dozen panzer and Panzergrenadier divisions forming the armored spearhead and various infantry units to form a defensive line as the battle unfolded. By this time the German Army suffered from an acute manpower shortage, and the force had been reduced to around 30 divisions. Although it retained most of its armor, there were not enough infantry units because of the defensive needs in the East. These 30 newly rebuilt divisions used some of the last reserves of the German Army. Among them were Volksgrenadier ('People's Grenadier') units formed from a mix of battle-hardened veterans and recruits formerly regarded as too young, too old or too frail to fight. Training time, equipment and supplies were inadequate during the preparations. German fuel supplies were precarious—those materials and supplies that could not be directly transported by rail had to be horse-drawn to conserve fuel, and the mechanized and panzer divisions would depend heavily on captured fuel. As a result, the start of the offensive was delayed from 27 November until 16 December.

Before the offensive the Allies were virtually blind to German troop movement. During the liberation of France, the extensive network of the French Resistance had provided valuable intelligence about German dispositions. Once they reached the German border, this source dried up. In France, orders had been relayed within the German army using radio messages enciphered by the Enigma machine, and these could be picked up and decrypted by Allied code-breakers headquartered at Bletchley Park, to give the intelligence known as Ultra. In Germany such orders were typically transmitted using telephone and teleprinter, and a special radio silence order was imposed on all matters concerning the upcoming offensive. The major crackdown in the Wehrmacht after the 20 July plot to assassinate Hitler resulted in much tighter security and fewer leaks. The foggy autumn weather also prevented Allied reconnaissance aircraft from correctly assessing the ground situation. German units assembling in the area were even issued charcoal instead of wood for cooking fires to cut down on smoke and reduce chances of Allied observers deducing a troop buildup was underway.

For these reasons Allied High Command considered the Ardennes a quiet sector, relying on assessments from their intelligence services that the Germans were unable to launch any major offensive operations this late in the war. What little intelligence they had led the Allies to believe precisely what the Germans wanted them to believe-–that preparations were being carried out only for defensive, not offensive, operations. The Allies relied too much on Ultra, not human reconnaissance. In fact, because of the Germans' efforts, the Allies were led to believe that a new defensive army was being formed around Düsseldorf in the northern Rhineland, possibly to defend against British attack. This was done by increasing the number of flak (Flugabwehrkanonen, i.e., anti-aircraft cannons) in the area and the artificial multiplication of radio transmissions in the area. All of this meant that the attack, when it came, completely surprised the Allied forces. Remarkably, the U.S. First Army intelligence chief, U.S. Third Army intelligence chief Colonel Oscar Koch, and Supreme Headquarters Allied Expeditionary Force (SHAEF) intelligence officer Brigadier General Kenneth Strong all correctly predicted the German offensive capability and intention to strike the U.S. VIII Corps area. These predictions were largely dismissed by the U.S. 12th Army Group. Strong had informed Bedell Smith in December of his suspicions. Bedell Smith sent Strong to warn Lieutenant General Omar Bradley, the commander of the 12th Army Group, of the danger. Bradley's response was succinct: "Let them come." Historian Patrick K. O'Donnell writes that on 8 December 1944 U.S. Rangers at great cost took Hill 400 during the Battle of the Hürtgen Forest. The next day GIs who relieved the Rangers reported a considerable movement of German troops inside the Ardennes in the enemy's rear, but that no one in the chain of command connected the dots. British forces further north were slightly better prepared. Having received decoded signals from Bletchley Park containing Luftwaffe instructions not to destroy certain bridges on the Meuse, Montgomery opted to put on hold a planned northward move from XXX Corps and instead held in reserve; this would prove significant in the subsequent battle. Despite this however, they too were doubtful of the possibility of a major offensive.

Because the Ardennes was considered a quiet sector, considerations of economy of force led it to be used as a training ground for new units and a rest area for units that had seen hard fighting. The U.S. units deployed in the Ardennes thus were a mixture of inexperienced troops (such as the 99th and 106th "Golden Lions" Divisions), and battle-hardened troops sent to that sector to recuperate (the 28th Infantry Division).

Two major special operations were planned for the offensive. By October it was decided that Otto Skorzeny, the German SS-commando who had rescued the former Italian dictator Benito Mussolini, was to lead a task force of English-speaking German soldiers in Operation Greif. These soldiers were to be dressed in American and British uniforms and wear dog tags taken from corpses and prisoners of war. Their job was to go behind American lines and change signposts, misdirect traffic, generally cause disruption and seize bridges across the Meuse River. By late November another ambitious special operation was added: Col. Friedrich August von der Heydte was to lead a Fallschirmjäger-Kampfgruppe (paratrooper combat group) in Operation Stösser, a night-time paratroop drop behind the Allied lines aimed at capturing a vital road junction near Malmedy.

German intelligence had set 20 December as the expected date for the start of the upcoming Soviet offensive, aimed at crushing what was left of German resistance on the Eastern Front and thereby opening the way to Berlin. It was hoped that Soviet leader Stalin would delay the start of the operation once the German assault in the Ardennes had begun and wait for the outcome before continuing.

After the 20 July 1944 attempt to assassinate Hitler, and the close advance of the Red Army which would seize the site on 27 January 1945, Hitler and his staff had been forced to abandon the Wolfsschanze headquarters in East Prussia, in which they had coordinated much of the fighting on the Eastern Front. After a brief visit to Berlin, Hitler traveled on his Führersonderzug ('Special Train of the Führer') to Giessen on 11 December, taking up residence in the Adlerhorst (eyrie) command complex, co-located with OB West's base at Kransberg Castle. Believing in omens and the successes of his early war campaigns that had been planned at Kransberg, Hitler had chosen the site from which he had overseen the successful 1940 campaign against France and the Low Countries.

Von Rundstedt set up his operational headquarters near Limburg, close enough for the generals and Panzer Corps commanders who were to lead the attack to visit Adlerhorst on 11 December, traveling there in an SS-operated bus convoy. With the castle acting as overflow accommodation, the main party was settled into the Adlerhorst's Haus 2 command bunker, including Gen. Alfred Jodl, Gen. Wilhelm Keitel, Gen. Blumentritt, von Manteuffel and Dietrich.

In a personal conversation on 13 December between Walter Model and Friedrich von der Heydte, who was put in charge of Operation Stösser, von der Heydte gave Operation Stösser less than a 10% chance of succeeding. Model told him it was necessary to make the attempt: "It must be done because this offensive is the last chance to conclude the war favorably."

Shortly before the start of the offensive, Dietrich and his chief of staff altered the plan. Instead of crossing the Meuse to the west of Liège, Sixth Panzer Army would cross on both sides of the city. If the offensive failed to reach Antwerp, Liège could be captured as a "small solution". Rundstedt and Model tacitly approved, but Jodl and Hitler were not informed. During postwar questioning, Dietrich's story shifted. First he claimed that he issued orders to cross between Liège and Huy. When told that the Americans had captured a map showing pincer movements around Liège, Dietrich said it could have been a Fifteenth Army map. When Dietrich was shown the map, he said that the original plan was to cross on either or both sides of Liège depending on the circumstances. When the northern half of his army's attack bogged down, he changed his order to cross between Liège and Huy, both exclusive. He denied any intention of capturing Liège: it would have been cut off and bypassed.

== Initial German assault ==
Situation on the Western Front as of 15 December 1944

On 16 December 1944 at 05:30, the Germans began the assault with a massive, 90-minute artillery barrage using 1,600 artillery pieces across a 130-kilometer (80 mi) front on the Allied troops facing the 6th Panzer Army. The Americans' initial impression was that this was the anticipated, localized counterattack resulting from the Allies' recent attack in the Wahlerscheid sector to the north, where the 2nd Division had knocked a sizable dent in the Siegfried Line. Heavy snowstorms engulfed parts of the Ardennes area. While having the effect of keeping the Allied aircraft grounded, the weather also proved troublesome for the Germans because poor road conditions hampered their advance. Poor traffic control led to massive traffic jams and fuel shortages in forward units. Nearly 10 hours into the assault, one of the German V-2 rockets destroyed the Cine Rex cinema in Antwerp, killing 567 people, the highest death toll from a single rocket attack during the war.

In the center, von Manteuffel's Fifth Panzer Army attacked towards Bastogne and St. Vith, both road junctions of great strategic importance. In the south, Brandenberger's Seventh Army pushed towards Luxembourg in its efforts to secure the flank from Allied attacks. By 17 December 1944, German forces under Colonel Joachim Peiper had seized a U.S. fuel depot in Büllingen, Belgium, containing about 50,000 gallons of gasoline, a major war prize.

=== Units involved in initial assault ===
Forces deployed North to South

Northern Sector
Monschau to Krewinkel

(United States) U.S. Forces

- 102nd Cavalry Group, Mechanized
- 9th Infantry Regiment / 2nd Infantry Division
- 395th Infantry Regiment / 99th Infantry Division
- 23rd Infantry Regiment / 2nd Infantry Division
- 38th Infantry Regiment / 2nd Infantry Division
- 393rd Infantry Regiment / 99th Infantry Division
- Combat Command B / 9th Armored Division
- 394th Infantry Regiment / 99th Infantry Division
- 14th Cavalry Group, Mechanized

(Nazi Germany) German Forces

- Sixth Panzer Army (Dietrich)
  - LXVII Corps (Hitzfeld)
    - 326th Volksgrenadier Division (Note: Only two battalions)
    - 246th Volksgrenadier Division
  - I SS Panzer Corps (Prieß)
    - 277th Volksgrenadier Division
    - 12th SS Panzer Division (Note: Hitler Jugend)
    - 12th Volksgrenadier Division
    - 1st SS Panzer Division (Note: Leibstandarte SS Adolf Hitler) (Including Kampfgruppe Peiper)
    - 3rd Fallschirmjäger Division
    - 150th Panzer Brigade (Skorzeny)

Central Sector
Roth to Gemünd

(United States) U.S. Forces

- Surrounded and captured on the Schnee Eifel:
  - 422nd Infantry Regiment / 106th Infantry Division
  - 423rd Infantry Regiment (Note: Private Kurt Vonnegut, later a noted author, was captured while serving in this unit.) / 106th Infantry Division
- 392nd Engineer General Service Regiment
- 424th Infantry Regiment / 106th Infantry Division
- 112th Infantry Regiment / 28th Infantry Division
- Combat Command R / 9th Armored Division
- 110th Infantry Regiment / 28th Infantry Division

(Nazi Germany) German Forces

- Fifth Panzer Army (von Manteuffel)
  - LXVI Corps (Lucht)
    - 18th Volksgrenadier Division
    - 62nd Volksgrenadier Division
  - LVIII Panzer Corps (Kruger)
    - 116th Panzer Division
    - 560th Volksgrenadier Division
  - XLVII Panzer Corps (Lüttwitz)
    - 2nd Panzer Division
    - 26th Volksgrenadier Division
    - Panzer Lehr Division

Southern Sector
Hochscheid to Mompach

(United States) U.S. Forces

- 109th Infantry Regiment / 28th Infantry Division
- Combat Command A / 9th Armored Division
- 12th Infantry Regiment / 4th Infantry Division
- 8th Infantry Regiment / 4th Infantry Division
- 372nd Engineer General Service Regiment

(Nazi Germany) German Forces

- Seventh Army (Brandenberger)
  - LXXXV Corps (Kniess)
    - 5th Fallschirmjäger Division
    - 352nd Volksgrenadier Division
  - LXXX Corps (Beyer)
    - 276th Volksgrenadier Division
    - 212th Volksgrenadier Division

== Attack on the northern shoulder ==
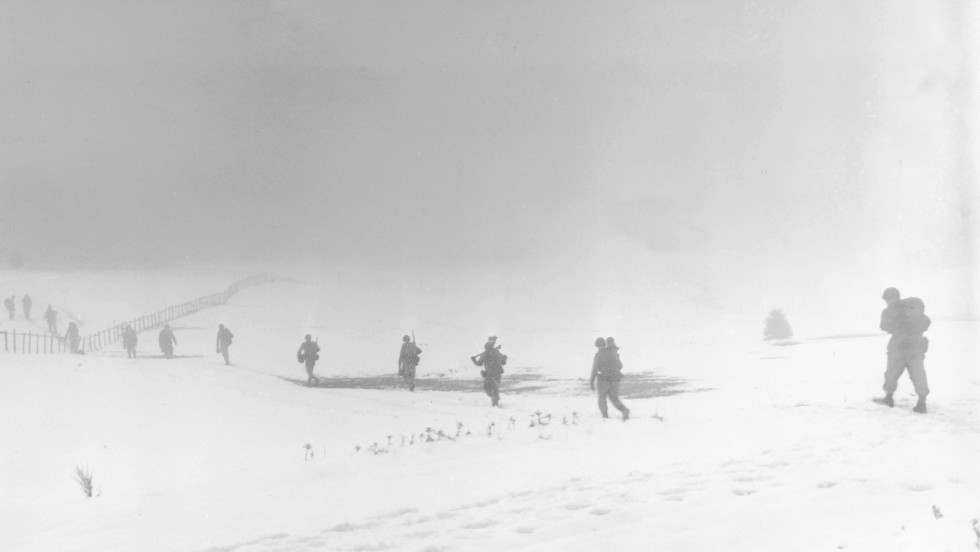
American troops marching through a snowy field under mist near Krinkelt, 1944

The Battle of Elsenborn Ridge is described as the decisive component of the Battle of the Bulge. At Elsenborn Ridge, untested troops of the 99th Infantry Division and the battle-hardened but weary troops of the 2nd Infantry Division repelled an advance by some of the best-equipped volksgrenadier and armored units of the German army, forcing them to divert their offensive spearhead onto less favorable routes further south, which considerably slowed their advance.

=== Best German divisions assigned ===
The attack on Monschau, Höfen, Krinkelt-Rocherath, and then Elsenborn Ridge was led by the units personally selected by Adolf Hitler. The 6th Panzer Army was given priority for supply and equipment and was assigned the shortest route to the ultimate objective of the offensive, Antwerp. The 6th Panzer Army included the elite of the Waffen-SS, including four Panzer divisions and five infantry divisions in three corps. SS-Obersturmbannführer Joachim Peiper led Kampfgruppe Peiper, consisting of 4,800 men and 600 vehicles, which was charged with leading the main effort. Its newest and most powerful tank, the Tiger II heavy tank, consumed two US gallons of fuel per mile (470 litres per 100 km), and the Germans only had enough fuel for an estimated 90 to 100 miles (140 to 160 km) of travel, not nearly enough to reach Antwerp.

=== German forces held up ===
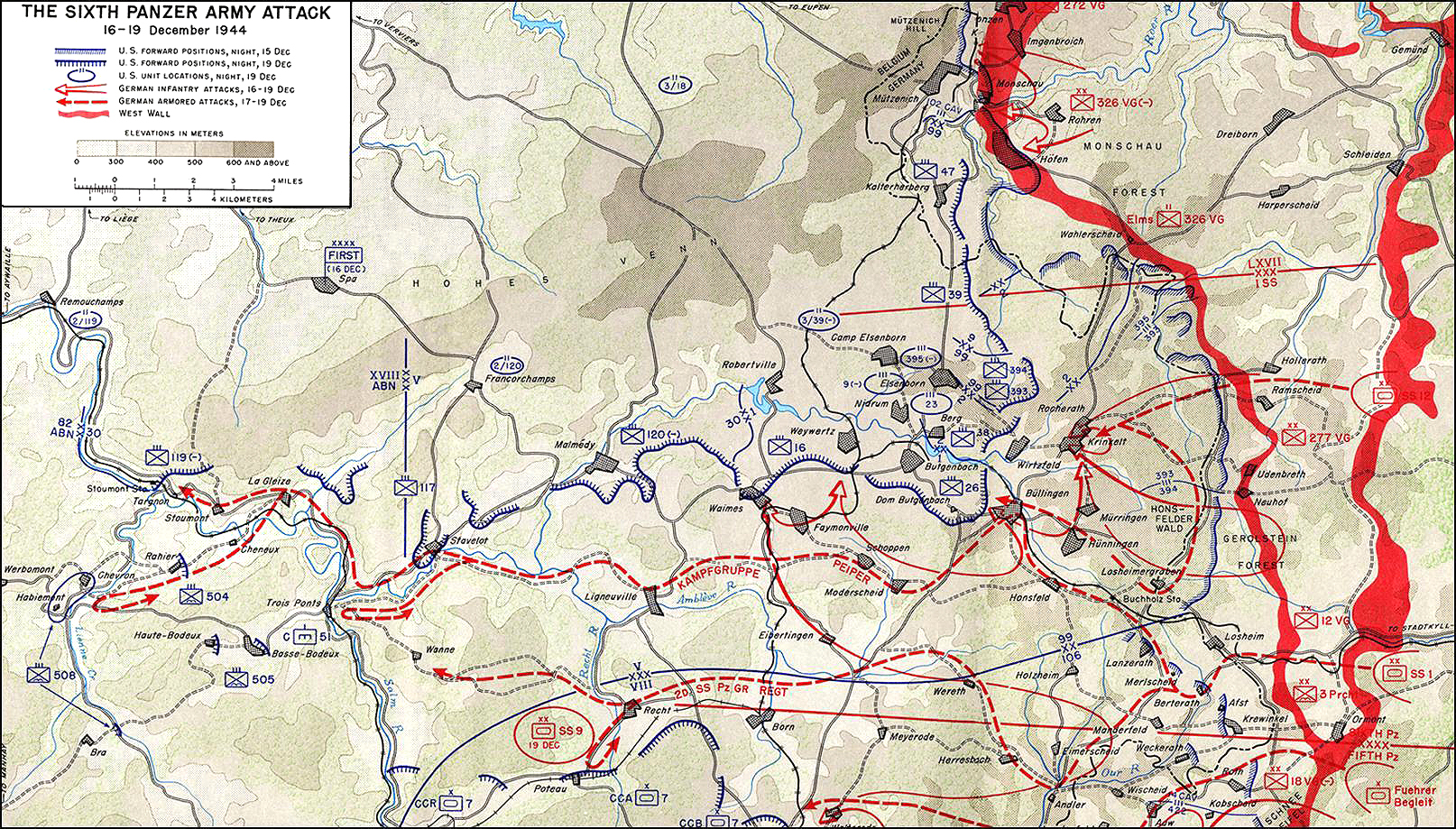
Sepp Dietrich led the Sixth Panzer Army in the northernmost attack route.

The attacks by the Sixth Panzer Army's volksgrenadier units in the north fared badly because of unexpectedly fierce resistance by the U.S. 2nd and 99th Infantry Divisions, which played a decisive role in blunting the German advance.

At Höfen, a town at the northern edge of the Sixth Panzer Army's offensive that connected to the crucial Monschau–Eupen–Liège road network, 3rd Battalion, 395th Infantry Regiment of the 99th, reinforced by Company A, 612th Tank Destroyer Battalion, repeatedly defeated armored and infantry attacks by the 326th Volksgrenadier Division. Although units at this sector were at times virtually surrounded, it did not yield ground. On at least six occasions the 3rd Battalion of the 395th called in artillery on or close to their own positions. Casualties for the Germans in this sector were heavy and disproportionate. By 18 December, German dead at Höfen numbered 554, an additional 53 were captured, plus an unknown number wounded, while the Americans only suffered 5 killed and 7 wounded.

Kampfgruppe Peiper, at the head of Sepp Dietrich's Sixth Panzer Army, had been designated to take the Losheim-Losheimergraben road, a key route through the Losheim Gap, but it was closed by two collapsed overpasses that German engineers failed to repair during the first day. Peiper's forces were rerouted through Lanzerath. To preserve the quantity of armor available, the infantry of the 9th Fallschirmjaeger Regiment, 3rd Fallschirmjaeger Division, had been ordered to clear the village first. In another example of bitter American resistance in the north, at Lanzerath Ridge a single 18-man Intelligence and Reconnaissance Platoon from the 99th Infantry Division along with four Forward Air Controllers held up the battalion of about 500 German paratroopers until sunset, about 16:00, causing 92 casualties among the Germans.

This created a bottleneck in the German advance. Kampfgruppe Peiper did not begin its advance until nearly 16:00, more than 16 hours behind schedule and didn't reach Bockholtz Station until the early morning of 17 December. Their intention was to control the twin villages of Rocherath-Krinkelt which would clear a path to the high ground of Elsenborn Ridge. Occupation of this dominating terrain would allow control of the roads to the south and west and ensure supply to Kampfgruppe Peiper's armored task force.

=== Malmedy massacres ===
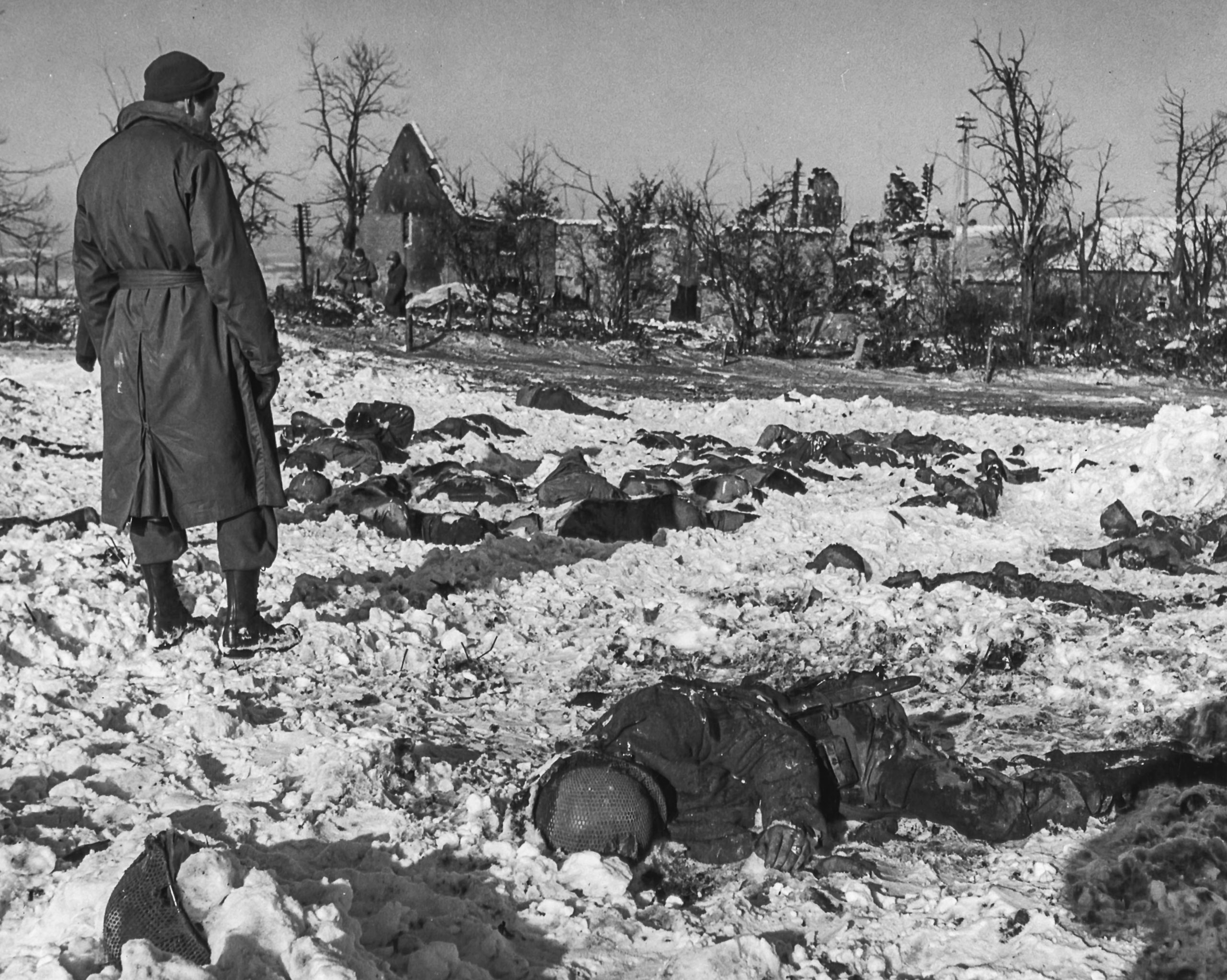
Scene of the Malmedy massacre

At 4:30 a.m. on 17 December 1944, the 1st SS Panzer Division was approximately 16 hours behind schedule when the convoys departed the village of Lanzerath enroute west to the town of Honsfeld. After capturing Honsfeld, Peiper detoured from his assigned route to seize a small fuel depot in Büllingen, where the Waffen-SS infantry summarily executed dozens of U.S. POWs. Afterwards, Peiper advanced to the west, towards the River Meuse and captured Ligneuville, bypassing the towns of Mödersheid, Schoppen, Ondenval, and Thirimont. The terrain and poor quality of the roads made the advance of Kampfgruppe Peiper difficult; at the exit to the village of Thirimont, the armored spearhead was unable to travel the road directly to Ligneuville, and Peiper deviated from the planned route, and rather than turn to the left, the armored spearhead turned to the right, and advanced towards the crossroads of Baugnez, which is equidistant from the city of Malmedy and Ligneuville and Waimes.

At 12:30 p.m. on 17 December, Kampfgruppe Peiper was near the hamlet of Baugnez, on the height halfway between the town of Malmedy and Ligneuville, when they encountered elements of the 285th Field Artillery Observation Battalion, U.S. 7th Armored Division. After a brief battle the lightly armed Americans surrendered. They were disarmed and, with some other Americans captured earlier (approximately 150 men), sent to stand in a field near the crossroads under light guard. About fifteen minutes after Peiper's advance guard passed through, the main body under the command of SS-Sturmbannführer Werner Pötschke arrived. The SS troopers suddenly opened fire on the prisoners. As soon as the firing began, the prisoners panicked. Most were shot where they stood, though some managed to flee. Accounts of the killing vary, but at least 84 of the POWs were murdered. Others survived, and news of the killings of prisoners of war spread through Allied lines. Following the end of the war, soldiers and officers of Kampfgruppe Peiper, including Peiper and SS general Dietrich, were tried for the incident at the Malmedy massacre trial.

=== Kampfgruppe Peiper deflected southeast ===
Driving to the south-east of Elsenborn, Kampfgruppe Peiper entered Honsfeld, where they encountered one of the 99th Division's rest centers, clogged with confused American troops. They quickly captured portions of the 3rd Battalion of the 394th Infantry Regiment. They destroyed a number of American armored units and vehicles, and took several dozen prisoners who were subsequently murdered. Peiper also captured 50,000 US gallons (190,000 L; 42,000 imp gal) of fuel for his vehicles.

Peiper advanced north-west towards Büllingen, keeping to the plan to move west, unaware that if he had turned north he had an opportunity to flank and trap the entire 2nd and 99th Divisions. Instead, intent on driving west, Peiper turned south to detour around Hünningen, choosing a route designated Rollbahn D as he had been given latitude to choose the best route west.

To the north, the 277th Volksgrenadier Division attempted to break through the defending line of the U.S. 99th and the 2nd Infantry Divisions but fared poorly. The 12th SS Panzer Division, reinforced by additional infantry (Panzergrenadier and Volksgrenadier) units, took the key road junction at Losheimergraben just north of Lanzerath and attacked the twin villages of Rocherath–Krinkelt on 17 December. At Rocherath, attacks by the 12th SS were initially met with success. By midday the remnants of the 99th at Rocherath were at risk of being overrun, however, reinforcements from the veteran units of the 2nd Infantry Division arrived and put up a strong resistance that repulsed multiple attacks by the 12th SS. At nightfall however, the defenders, critically low on ammunition, were routed by an armored night attack and fell back to Krinkelt. The German armored spearhead then held its position outside of Krinkelt out of fear that it might run into a superior force.

=== Wereth 11 ===
Another, smaller, massacre was committed in Wereth, Belgium, approximately 6.5 miles (10.5 km) northeast of Saint-Vith on 17 December 1944. Eleven black American soldiers were tortured after surrendering and then shot by men of the 1st SS Panzer Division belonging to Schnellgruppe Knittel. Some of the injuries sustained before death included bayonet wounds to the head, broken legs, and their fingers cut off. The perpetrators were never punished for this crime.

=== Germans advance west ===
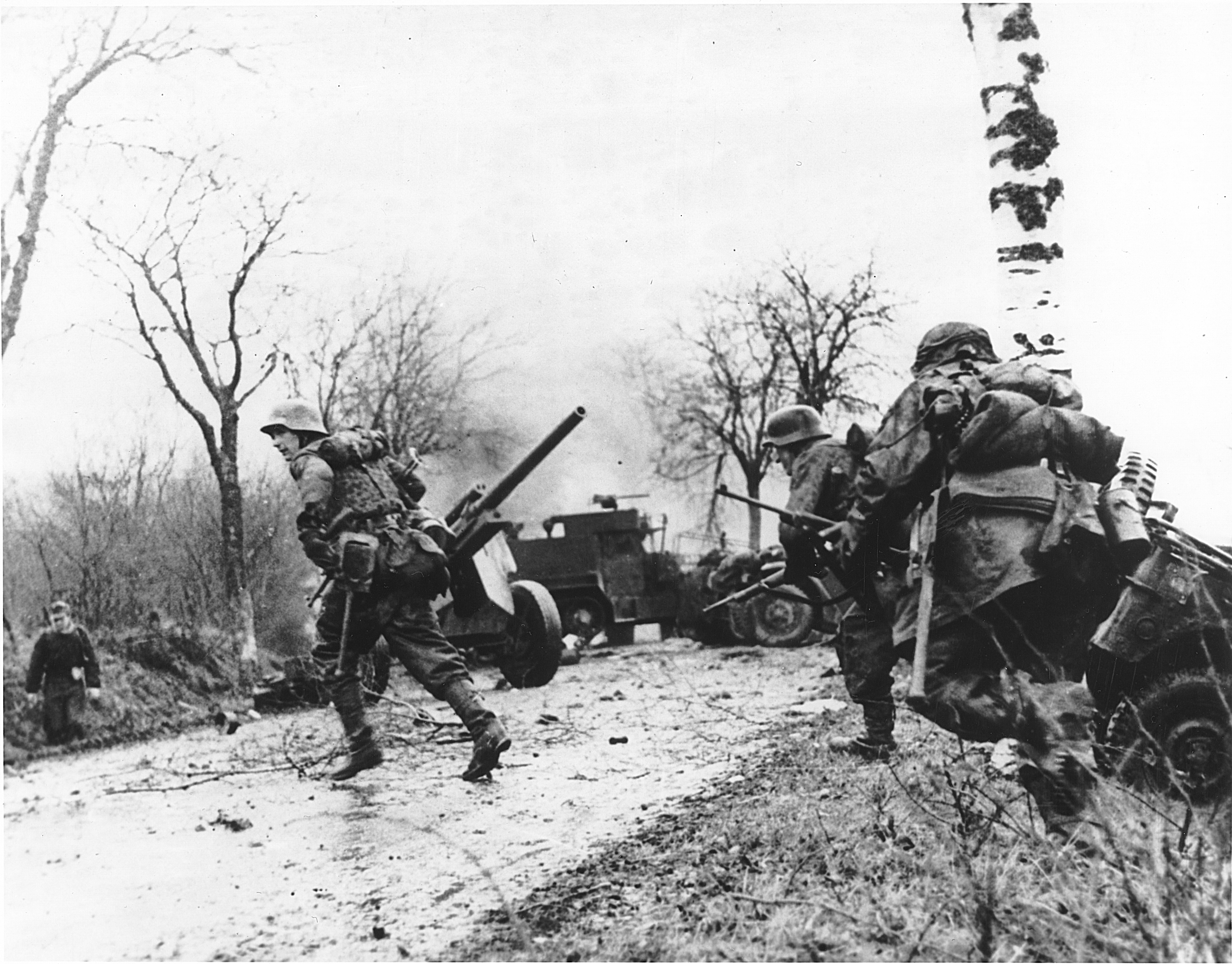
German troops advancing past abandoned American equipment

By the evening the spearhead had pushed north to engage the U.S. 99th Infantry Division and Kampfgruppe Peiper arrived in front of Stavelot. Peiper's forces were already behind his timetable because of the stiff American resistance and because when the Americans fell back, their engineers blew up bridges and emptied fuel dumps. Peiper's unit was delayed and his vehicles denied critically needed fuel. They took 36 hours to advance from the Eifel region to Stavelot, while the same advance required nine hours in 1940.

Kampfgruppe Peiper attacked Stavelot on 18 December but was unable to capture the town before the Americans evacuated a large fuel depot. Three tanks attempted to take the bridge, but the lead vehicle was disabled by a mine. Following this, 60 grenadiers advanced forward but were stopped by concentrated American defensive fire. After a fierce tank battle the next day, the Germans finally entered the town when U.S. engineers failed to blow the bridge.

Capitalizing on his success and not wanting to lose more time, Peiper rushed an advance group toward the vital bridge at Trois-Ponts, leaving the bulk of his strength in Stavelot. When they reached it at 11:30 on 18 December, retreating U.S. engineers blew it up. Peiper detoured north towards the villages of La Gleize and Cheneux. At Cheneux, the advance guard was attacked by American fighter-bombers, destroying two tanks and five halftracks, blocking the narrow road. The group began moving again at dusk at 16:00 and was able to return to its original route at around 18:00. Of the two bridges remaining between Kampfgruppe Peiper and the Meuse, the bridge over the Lienne was blown by the Americans as the Germans approached. Peiper turned north and halted his forces in the woods between La Gleize and Stoumont. He learned that Stoumont was strongly held and that the Americans were bringing up strong reinforcements from Spa.

To Peiper's south, the advance of Kampfgruppe Hansen had stalled. SS-Oberführer Mohnke ordered Schnellgruppe Knittel, which had been designated to follow Hansen, to instead move forward to support Peiper. SS-Sturmbannführer Knittel crossed the bridge at Stavelot around 19:00 against American forces trying to retake the town. Knittel pressed forward towards La Gleize, and shortly afterward the Americans recaptured Stavelot. Peiper and Knittel both faced the prospect of being cut off.

In early morning of the 18th at Elsenborn, the 12th SS renewed their advance into Krinkelt which was now held mostly by the veteran 38th Infantry Regiment along with remnants of the 99th. The outnumbered 38th again put up a strong defense that dissolved into fierce close quarters house-to-house fighting as German infantry and tanks stormed the village. Despite a tenacious resistance the defenders were ordered to break contact, abandon the twin villages and reestablish positions on the strategic boomerang shaped Elsenborn Ridge.

=== German advance halted ===
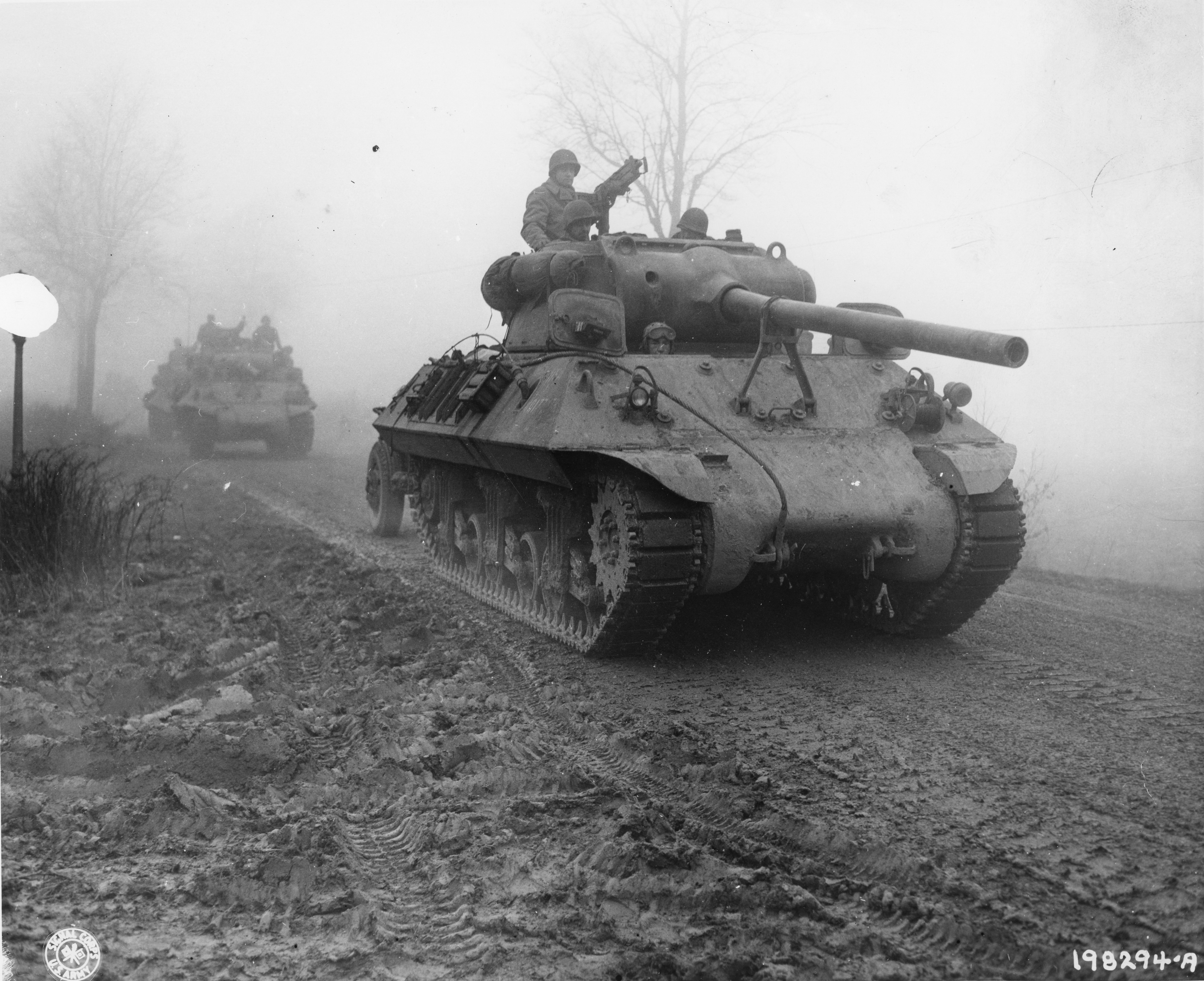
M3 90mm gun-armed American M36 tank destroyers move forward to stem German spearhead near Werbomont, Belgium, 20 December 1944.

At dawn on 19 December, Peiper surprised the American defenders of Stoumont by sending infantry from the 2nd SS Panzergrenadier Regiment in an attack and a company of Fallschirmjäger to infiltrate their lines. He followed this with a Panzer attack, gaining the eastern edge of the town. An American tank battalion arrived but, after a two-hour tank battle, Peiper finally captured Stoumont at 10:30. Knittel joined up with Peiper and reported the Americans had recaptured Stavelot to their east. Peiper ordered Knittel to retake Stavelot. Assessing his own situation, he determined that his Kampfgruppe did not have sufficient fuel to cross the bridge west of Stoumont and continue his advance. He maintained his lines west of Stoumont for a while, until the evening of 19 December when he withdrew them to the village edge. On the same evening the U.S. 82nd Airborne Division under Maj. Gen. James Gavin arrived and deployed at La Gleize and along Peiper's planned route of advance.

German efforts to reinforce Peiper were unsuccessful. Kampfgruppe Hansen was still struggling against bad road conditions and stiff American resistance on the southern route. Schnellgruppe Knittel was forced to disengage from the heights around Stavelot. Kampfgruppe Sandig, which had been ordered to take Stavelot, launched another attack without success. Sixth Panzer Army commander Sepp Dietrich ordered Hermann Priess, commanding officer of the I SS Panzer Corps, to increase its efforts to back Peiper's battle group, but Priess was unable to break through.

Small units of the U.S. 2nd Battalion, 119th Infantry Regiment, 30th Infantry Division, attacked the dispersed units of Kampfgruppe Peiper on the morning of 21 December. They failed and were forced to withdraw, and a number were captured, including battalion commander Maj. Hal D. McCown. Peiper learned that his reinforcements had been directed to gather in La Gleize to his east, and he withdrew, leaving wounded Americans and Germans in the Froidcourt Castle. As he withdrew from Cheneux, American paratroopers from the 82nd Airborne Division engaged the Germans in fierce house-to-house fighting. The Americans shelled Kampfgruppe Peiper on 22 December, and although the Germans had run out of food and had virtually no fuel, they continued to fight. A Luftwaffe resupply mission went badly when SS-Brigadeführer Wilhelm Mohnke insisted the grid coordinates supplied by Peiper were wrong, parachuting supplies into American hands in Stoumont.

In La Gleize, Peiper set up defenses waiting for German relief. When the relief force was unable to penetrate the Allied lines, he decided to break through the Allied lines and return to the German lines on 23 December. The men of the Kampfgruppe were forced to abandon their vehicles and heavy equipment, although most of the 800 remaining troops were able to escape, out of an initial force of 4,800.

Further north at Elsenborn, the Americans continued to hold the line against the brunt of the Sixth Panzer Army. South of Elsenborn Ridge, at the village of Dom Butgenbach, reinforcements from the 26th Infantry Regiment of the veteran 1st Infantry Division, supported by divisional artillery, put up a determined defense that halted repeated attacks by 12th SS on the 20th, 21st and 22nd, inflicting heavy casualties on the attackers. After the battle, American graves registration counted 782 German dead in the area. 47 German tanks were destroyed in this sector. While some tanks managed to breakthrough the lines during these attacks, the SS Panzergrenadiers failed to even reach the lines due to heavy artillery fire. Alongside these attacks, the Sixth Panzer Army committed the reserve veteran 3rd Panzergrenadier Division against Elsenborn Ridge itself. These Panzergrenadiers from the regular army likewise fared poorly against American artillery. They suffered heavy casualties as the Americans, entrenched in strong positions on the ridge, laid down heavy fire when they emerged from the treeline and advanced up the slopes. Sixth Panzer Army north of Pieper was effectively halted at Dom Butgenbach and Elsenborn Ridge. After one final, desperate attack by the 246th Volksgrenadier Division on 26 February against the ridge failed, they made no further attempts to attack these positions.

=== Outcome ===
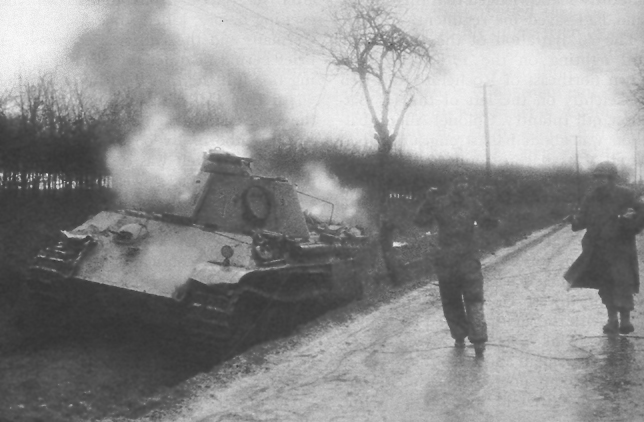
An American soldier escorts a German crewman from his wrecked Panther tank during the Battle of Elsenborn Ridge.

The stiff American defense prevented the Germans from reaching the vast array of supplies near the Belgian cities of Liège and Spa and the road network west of the Elsenborn Ridge leading to the Meuse River. After more than 10 days of intense battle, they pushed the Americans out of the villages, but were unable to dislodge them from the ridge, where elements of the V Corps of the First U.S. Army prevented the German forces from reaching the road network to their west. With the exception Kampfgruppe Pieper's frustrated advance, what was envisioned as the main thrust of Germany's last major offensive on the Western Front was halted at Elsenborn Ridge. Historian John S. D. Eisenhower wrote, "... the action of the 2nd and 99th Divisions on the northern shoulder could be considered the most decisive of the Ardennes campaign."

American losses were substantial. The 2nd Infantry Division lost over 1,000 men killed or unaccounted for. The 99th Infantry Division endured even greater losses, particularly among units caught in the path of Kampfgruppe Peiper, with casualties exceeding 3,000. Including supporting units, total American killed or missing in defense of the Northern Shoulder around Elsenborn rose to slightly more than 5,000.

=== Operation Stösser ===
Operation Stösser was a paratroop drop into the American rear in the High Fens (French: Hautes Fagnes; German: Hohes Venn; Dutch: Hoge Venen) area. The objective was the "Baraque Michel" crossroads. It was led by Oberst Friedrich August Freiherr von der Heydte, considered by Germans to be a hero of the Battle of Crete.

It was the German paratroopers' only nighttime drop during World War II. Heydte was given only eight days to prepare prior to the assault. He was not allowed to use his own regiment because their movement might alert the Allies to the impending counterattack. Instead, he was provided with a Kampfgruppe of 800 men. The II Parachute Corps was tasked with contributing 100 men from each of its regiments. In loyalty to their commander, 150 men from Heydte's own unit, the 6th Parachute Regiment, went against orders and joined him. They had little time to establish any unit cohesion or train together.

The parachute drop was a complete failure. Heydte ended up with a total of around 300 troops. Too small and too weak to counter the Allies, they abandoned plans to take the crossroads and instead converted the mission to reconnaissance. With only enough ammunition for a single fight, they withdrew towards Germany and attacked the rear of the American lines. Only about 100 of his weary men finally reached the German rear.

== Attack in the center ==
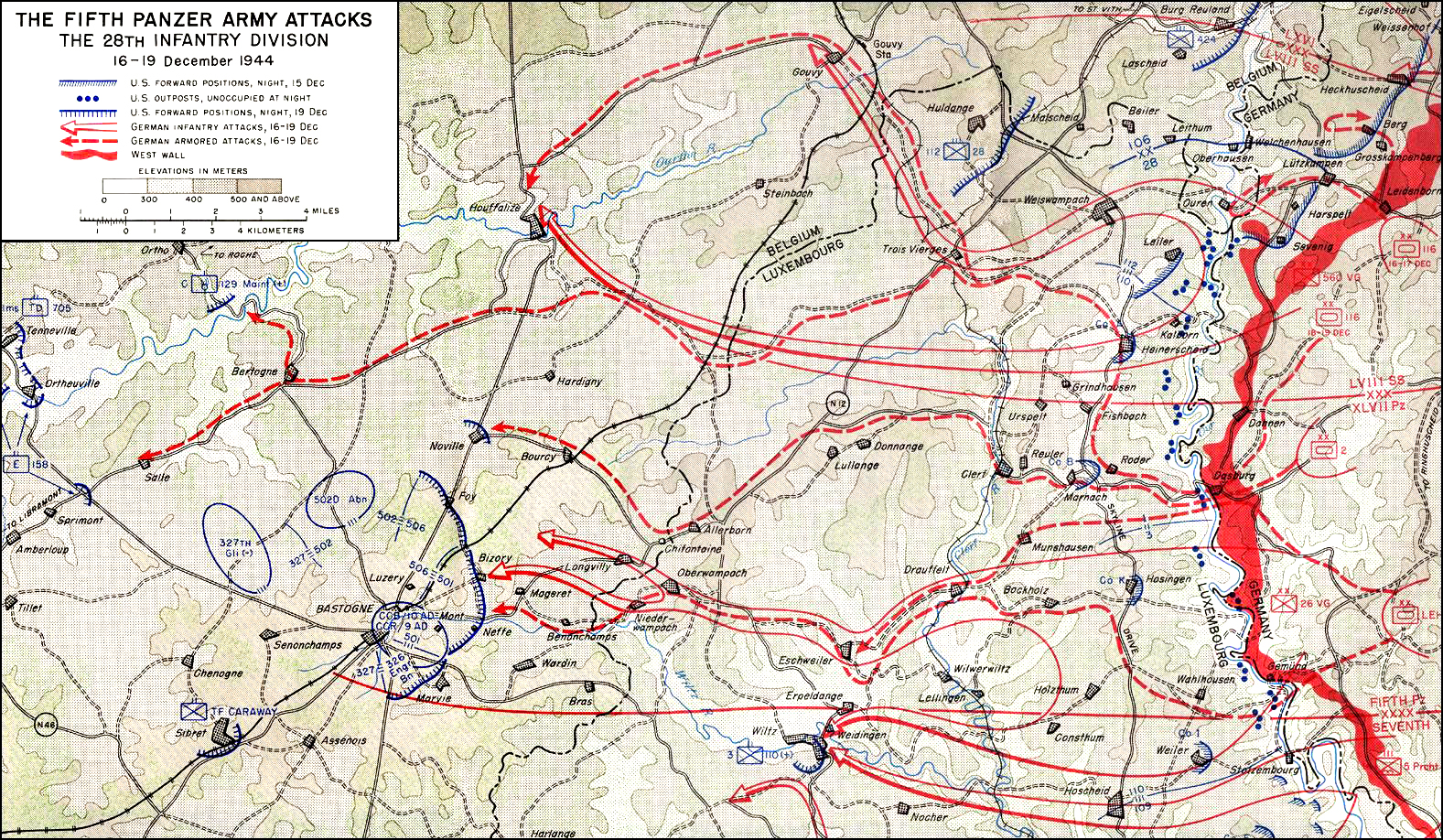
Hasso von Manteuffel led the Fifth Panzer Army in the middle attack route.

The Germans fared better in the center (the 32 km (20 mi) Schnee Eifel sector) as the Fifth Panzer Army attacked positions held by the U.S. 28th and 106th Infantry Divisions. The Germans lacked the overwhelming strength that had been deployed in the north, but still possessed a marked numerical and material superiority over the very thinly spread veteran 28th and inexperienced 106th divisions. They succeeded in surrounding two largely intact regiments (422nd and 423rd) of the 106th Division in a pincer movement and forced their surrender, a tribute to the way Manteuffel's new tactics had been applied. The official U.S. Army history states: "At least seven thousand [men] were lost here and the figure probably is closer to eight or nine thousand. The amount lost in arms and equipment, of course, was very substantial. The Schnee Eifel battle, therefore, represents the most serious reverse suffered by American arms during the operations of 1944–45 in the European theater."

=== Battle for St. Vith ===
In the center, the town of St. Vith, a vital road junction, presented the main challenge for both von Manteuffel's and Dietrich's forces. The defenders, led by the 7th Armored Division, included the remaining regiment of the 106th U.S. Infantry Division, with elements of the 9th Armored Division and 28th U.S. Infantry Division. These units, which operated under the command of Generals Robert W. Hasbrouck (7th Armored) and Alan W. Jones (106th Infantry), successfully resisted the German attacks, significantly slowing the German advance. At Montgomery's orders, St. Vith was evacuated on 21 December; U.S. troops fell back to entrenched positions in the area, presenting an imposing obstacle to a successful German advance. By 23 December, as the Germans shattered their flanks, the defenders' position became untenable and U.S. troops were ordered to retreat west of the Salm River. Since the German plan called for the capture of St. Vith by 18:00 on 17 December, the prolonged action in and around it dealt a major setback to their timetable.

=== Meuse River bridges ===
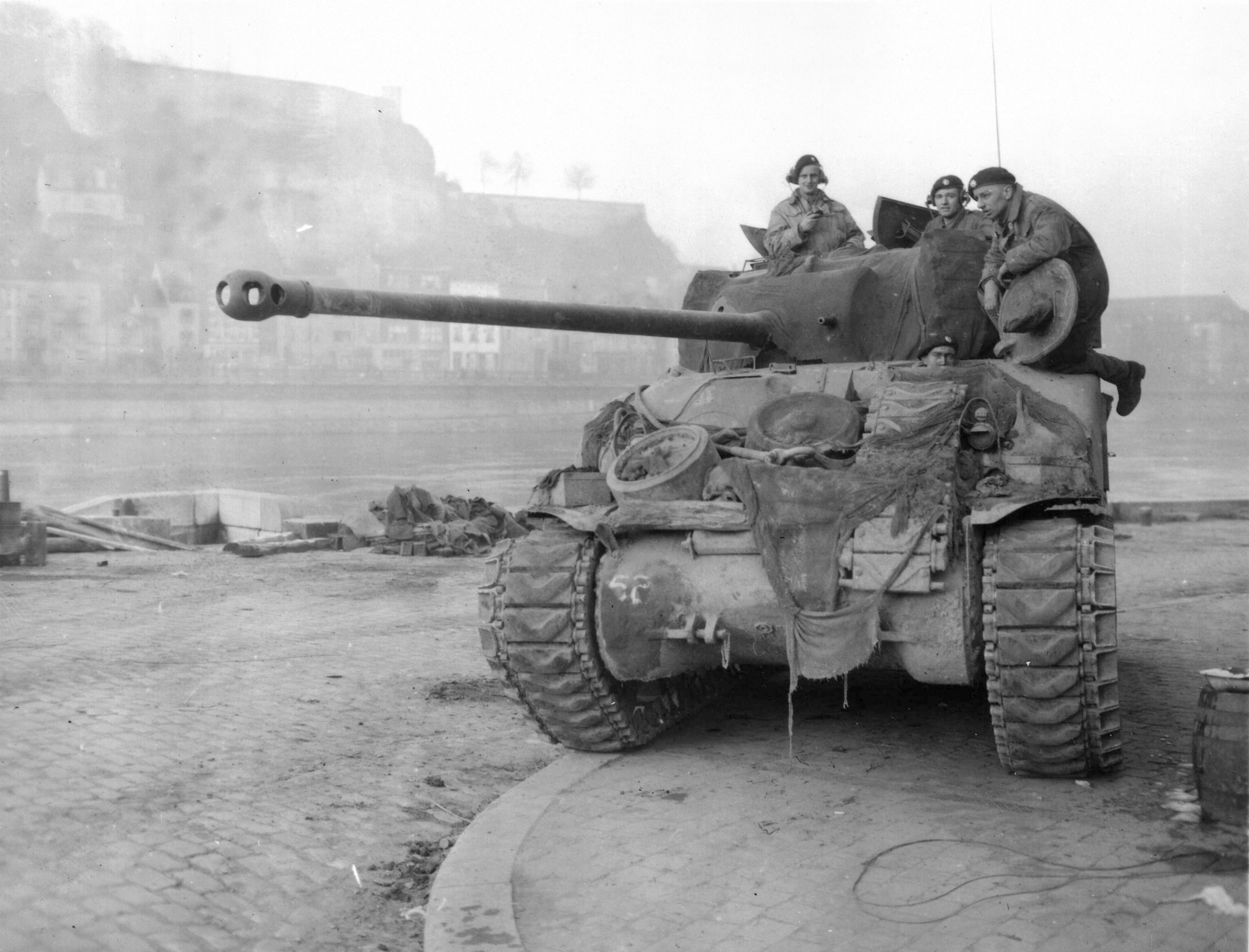
British Sherman "Firefly" tank in Namur on the Meuse River, December 1944

To protect the river crossings on the Meuse at Givet, Dinant and Namur, Montgomery ordered those few units available to hold the bridges on 19 December. This led to a hastily assembled force including rear-echelon troops, military police and Army Air Force personnel. The British 29th Armoured Brigade of British 11th Armoured Division, which had turned in its tanks for re-equipping, was told to take back their tanks and head to the area. British XXX Corps was significantly reinforced for this effort. Units of the corps which fought in the Ardennes were the 51st (Highland) and 53rd (Welsh) Infantry Divisions, the British 6th Airborne Division, the 29th and 33rd Armoured Brigades, and the 34th Tank Brigade.

Unlike the German forces on the northern and southern shoulders who were experiencing great difficulties, the German advance in the center gained considerable ground. The Fifth Panzer Army was spearheaded by the 2nd Panzer Division while the Panzer Lehr Division (Elite Armored Demonstration Division) came up from the south, leaving Bastogne to other units. The Ourthe River was passed at Ourtheville on 21 December. Lack of fuel held up the advance for one day, but on 23 December the offensive was resumed towards the two small towns of Hargimont and Marche-en-Famenne. Hargimont was captured the same day, but Marche-en-Famenne was strongly defended by the American 84th Division. Gen. von Lüttwitz, commander of the XXXXVII Panzer-Korps, ordered the division to turn westwards towards Dinant and the Meuse, leaving only a blocking force at Marche-en-Famenne. Although advancing only in a narrow corridor, 2nd Panzer Division was still making rapid headway, leading to jubilation in Berlin. Headquarters now freed up the 9th Panzer Division for Fifth Panzer Army, which was deployed at Marche.

On 22/23 December German forces reached the woods of Foy-Notre-Dame, only a few kilometers ahead of Dinant. The narrow corridor caused considerable difficulties, as constant flanking attacks threatened the division. On 24 December, German forces made their furthest penetration west. The Panzer Lehr Division took the town of Celles, while a bit farther north, parts of 2nd Panzer Division were in sight of the Meuse near Dinant at Foy-Notre-Dame. A hastily assembled British blocking force on the east side of the river prevented the German Battlegroup Böhm from approaching the Dinant bridge. The 29th Armoured Brigade ambushed the Germans knocking out three Panthers and a number of vehicles in and around Foy-Notre-Dame. By late Christmas Eve the advance in this sector was stopped, as Allied forces threatened the narrow corridor held by the 2nd Panzer Division.

=== Operation Greif and Operation Währung ===
For Operation Greif ("Griffin"), Otto Skorzeny successfully infiltrated a small part of his battalion of English-speaking Germans disguised in American uniforms behind the Allied lines. Although they failed to take the vital bridges over the Meuse, their presence caused confusion out of all proportion to their military activities, and rumors spread quickly. Even General George Patton was alarmed and, on 17 December, described the situation to General Dwight Eisenhower as "Krauts ... speaking perfect English ... raising hell, cutting wires, turning road signs around, spooking whole divisions, and shoving a bulge into our defenses."

Checkpoints were set up all over the Allied rear, greatly slowing the movement of soldiers and equipment. American MPs at these checkpoints grilled troops on things that every American was expected to know, like the identity of Mickey Mouse's girlfriend, baseball scores, or the capital of a particular U.S. state—though many could not remember or did not know. General Omar Bradley was briefly detained when he correctly identified Springfield as the capital of Illinois because the American MP who questioned him mistakenly believed the capital was Chicago.

The tightened security nonetheless made things very hard for the German infiltrators, and a number of them were captured. Even during interrogation, they continued their goal of spreading disinformation; when asked about their mission, some of them claimed they had been told to go to Paris to either kill or capture General Dwight Eisenhower. Security around the general was greatly increased, and Eisenhower was confined to his headquarters. Because Skorzeny's men were captured in American uniforms, they were executed as spies. This was a standard punishment option for most armies of the time, as many belligerents considered it necessary to protect their territory and forces against the grave dangers of enemy spying.

Skorzeny said that he was told by German legal experts that as long he did not order his men to fight in combat while wearing American uniforms, such a tactic was a legitimate ruse of war. Skorzeny and his men were fully aware of their likely fate, and most wore their German uniforms underneath their American ones in case of capture. Skorzeny was tried by an American military tribunal in 1947 at the Dachau Trials for allegedly violating the laws of war stemming from his leadership of Operation Greif but was acquitted. He later moved to Spain and South America.

== Attack in the south ==
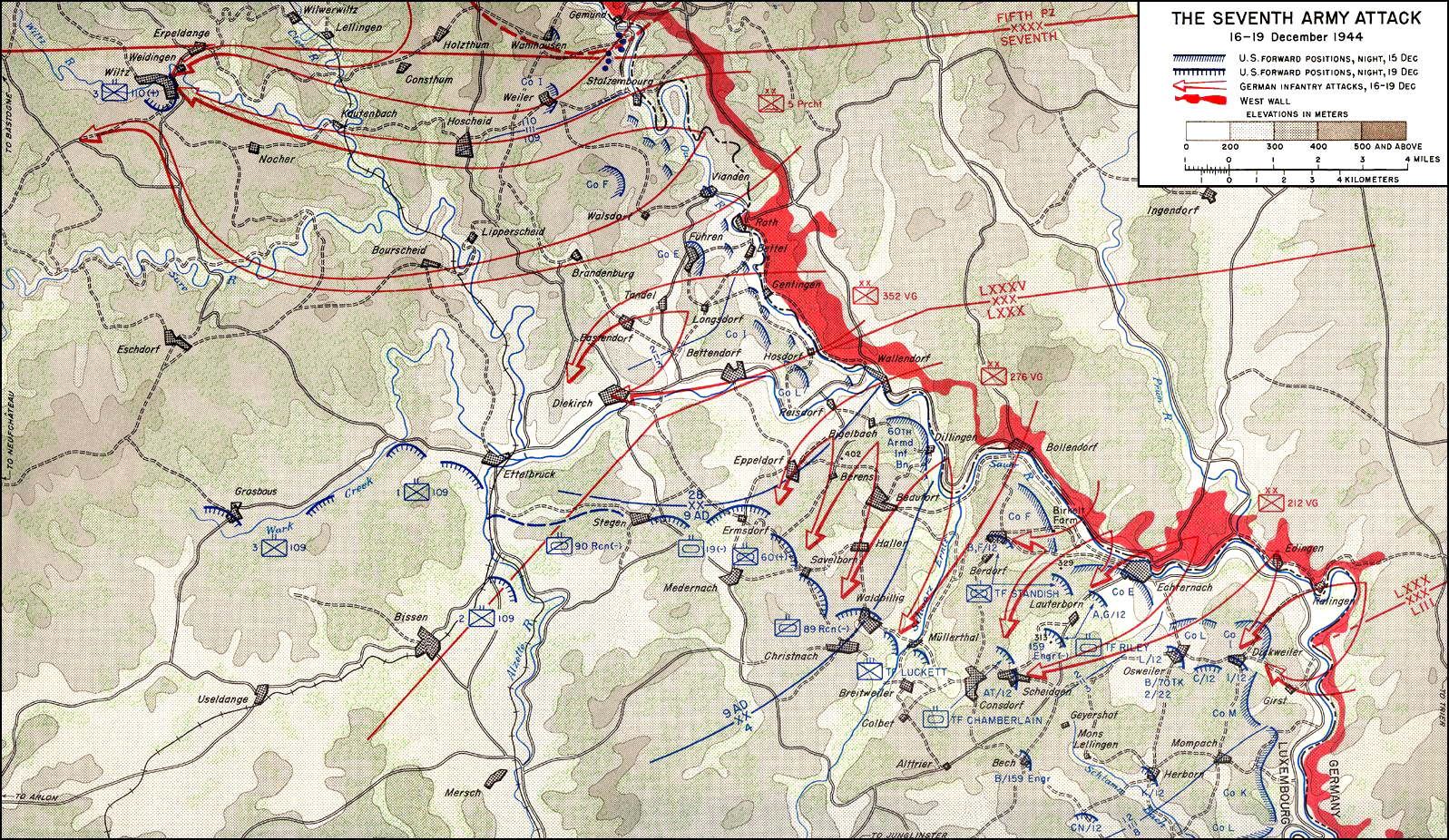
Erich Brandenberger led Seventh Army in the southernmost attack route.

Further south on Manteuffel's front, the main thrust was delivered by all attacking divisions crossing the River Our, then increasing the pressure on the key road centers of St. Vith and Bastogne. The more experienced U.S. 28th Infantry Division put up a much more dogged defense than the inexperienced soldiers of the 106th Infantry Division. The 112th Infantry Regiment (the most northerly of the 28th Division's regiments), holding a continuous front east of the Our, kept German troops from seizing and using the Our River bridges around Ouren for two days, before withdrawing progressively westwards.

The 109th and 110th Regiments of the 28th Division fared worse, as they were spread so thinly that their positions were easily bypassed. Both offered stubborn resistance in the face of superior forces and threw the German schedule off by several days. The 110th's situation was by far the worst, as it was responsible for an 18-kilometer (11 mi) front while its 2nd Battalion was withheld as the divisional reserve. Panzer columns took the outlying villages and widely separated strong points in bitter fighting, and advanced to points near Bastogne within four days. The struggle for the villages and American strong points, plus transport confusion on the German side, slowed the attack sufficiently to allow the 101st Airborne Division (reinforced by elements from the 9th and 10th Armored Divisions) to reach Bastogne by truck on the morning of 19 December. The fierce defense of Bastogne, in which American paratroopers particularly distinguished themselves, made it impossible for the Germans to take the town with its important road junctions. The panzer columns swung past on either side, cutting off Bastogne on 20 December but failing to secure the vital crossroads.

Twenty years after the battle, General McAuliffe praised the men of the 10th Armored "Tiger" Division saying, "It's always seemed regrettable to me, that Combat Command B of the 10th Armored Division didn't get the credit it deserved in the battle of Bastogne. All of the newspaper and radio talk was about the paratroopers. Actually, the 10th Armored Division was in there December 18th, a day before we were, and had some very hard fighting before we ever got into it, and I sincerely believe that we would never have been able to get into Bastogne if it had not been for the defensive fighting of the three elements of the 10th Armored Division who were first into Bastogne and protected the town from invasion by the Germans."

In the extreme south, Brandenberger's three infantry divisions were checked by divisions of the U.S. VIII Corps after an advance of 6.4 km (4 mi); that front was then firmly held. Only the 5th Parachute Division of Brandenberger's command was able to thrust forward 19 km (12 mi) on the inner flank to partially fulfill its assigned role. Eisenhower and his principal commanders realized by 17 December that the fighting in the Ardennes was a major offensive and not a local counterattack, and they ordered vast reinforcements to the area. Within a week 250,000 troops had been sent. General Gavin of the 82nd Airborne Division arrived on the scene first and ordered the 101st to hold Bastogne while the 82nd would take the more difficult task of facing the SS Panzer Divisions; it was also thrown into the battle north of the bulge, near Elsenborn Ridge.

=== Siege of Bastogne ===
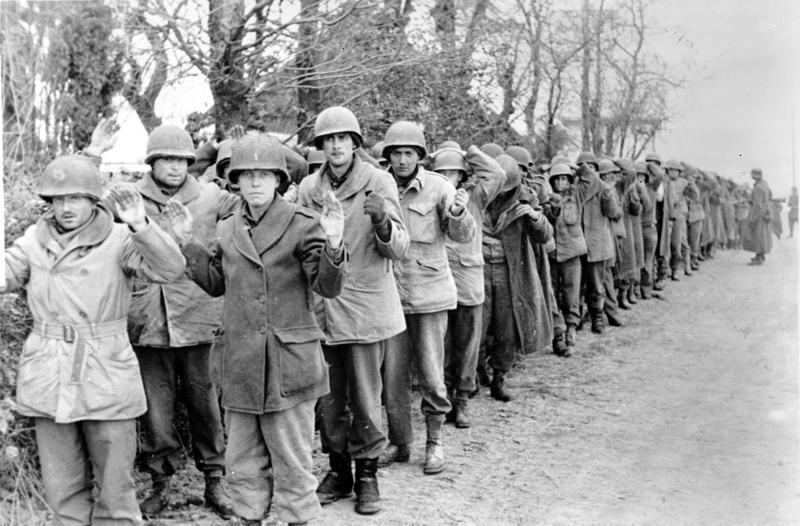
U.S. POWs on 22 December 1944

Senior Allied commanders met in a bunker in Verdun on 19 December. By this time, the town of Bastogne and its network of 11 hard-topped roads leading through the widely forested mountainous terrain with deep river valleys and boggy mud of the Ardennes region was under severe threat. Bastogne had previously been the site of the VIII Corps headquarters. Two separate westbound German columns that were to have bypassed the town to the south and north, the 2nd Panzer Division and Panzer-Lehr-Division of XLVII Panzer Corps, as well as the Corps' infantry (26th Volksgrenadier Division), coming due west had been engaged and much slowed and frustrated in outlying battles at defensive positions up to 16 kilometers (10 mi) from the town proper, but these defensive positions were gradually being forced back onto and into the hasty defenses built within the municipality. Moreover, the sole corridor that was open (to the southeast) was threatened and it had been sporadically closed as the front shifted, and there was expectation that it would be completely closed sooner than later, given the strong likelihood that the town would soon be surrounded.

Gen. Eisenhower, realizing that the Allies could destroy German forces much more easily when they were out in the open and on the offensive than if they were on the defensive, told his generals, "The present situation is to be regarded as one of opportunity for us and not of disaster. There will be only cheerful faces at this table." Patton, realizing what Eisenhower implied, responded, "Hell, let's have the guts to let the bastards go all the way to Paris. Then, we'll really cut 'em off and chew 'em up." Eisenhower, after saying he was not that optimistic, asked Patton how long it would take to turn his Third Army, located in northeastern France, north to counterattack. To the disbelief of the other generals present, Patton replied that he could attack with two divisions within 48 hours. Unknown to the other officers present, before he left, Patton had ordered his staff to prepare three contingency plans for a northward turn in at least corps strength. By the time Eisenhower asked him how long it would take, the movement was already underway. On 20 December, Eisenhower removed the First and Ninth U.S. Armies from Gen. Bradley's 12th Army Group and placed them under Montgomery's 21st Army Group.

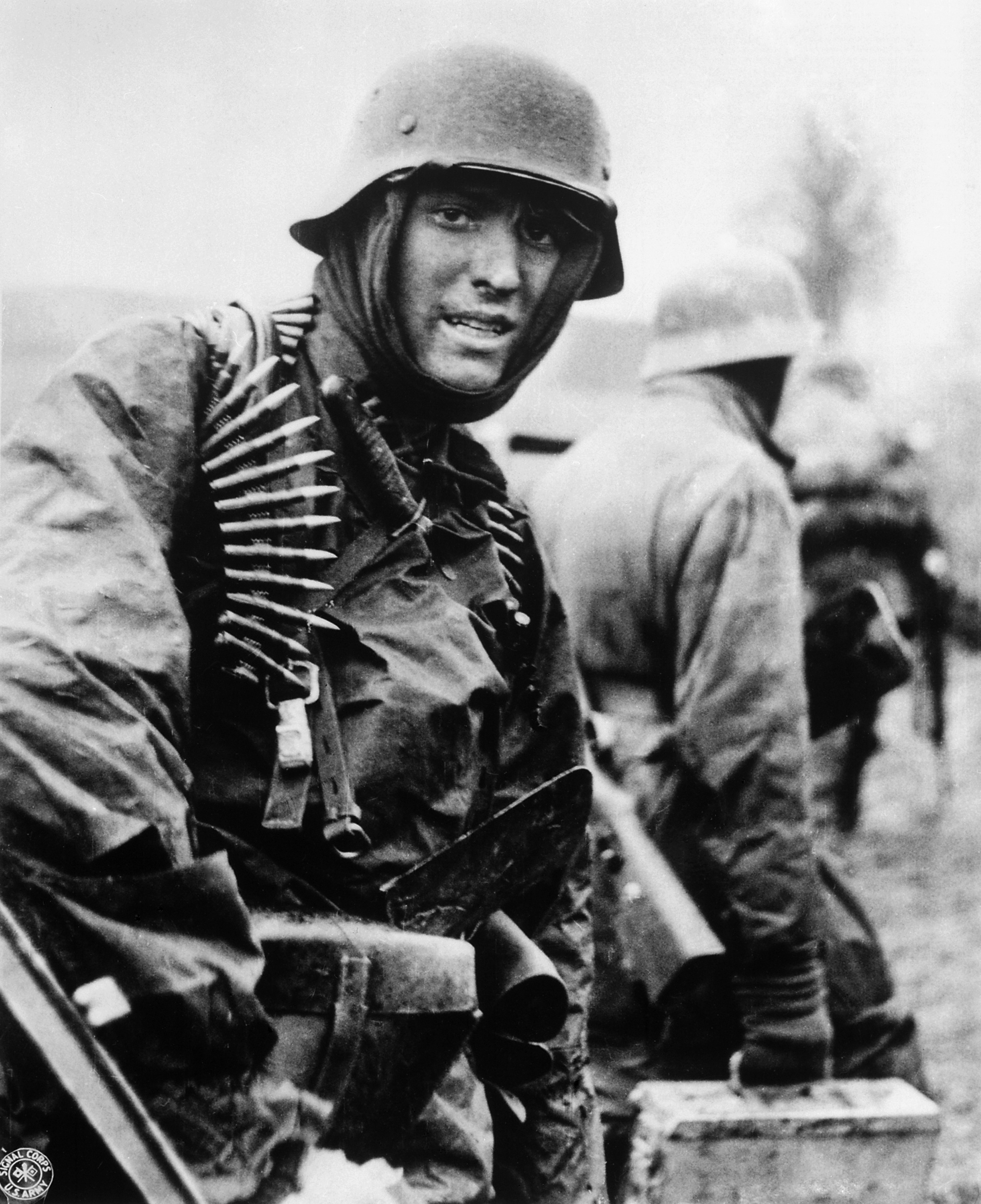
A German machine gunner marching through the Ardennes in December 1944

By 21 December the Germans had surrounded Bastogne, which was defended by the 101st Airborne Division, the all African American 969th Artillery Battalion, and Combat Command B of the 10th Armored Division. Conditions inside the perimeter were tough—most of the medical supplies and medical personnel had been captured. Food was scarce, and by 22 December artillery ammunition was restricted to 10 rounds per gun per day. The weather cleared the next day and supplies (primarily ammunition) were dropped over four of the next five days.

Despite determined German attacks, the perimeter held. The German commander, Lüttwitz, requested Bastogne's surrender. When Brig. Gen. Anthony McAuliffe, acting commander of the 101st, was told of the German demand to surrender, in frustration he responded, "Nuts!" After turning to other pressing issues, his staff reminded him that they should reply to the German demand. One officer, Lt. Col. Harry Kinnard, noted that McAuliffe's initial reply would be "tough to beat." Thus McAuliffe wrote on the paper, which was typed up and delivered to the Germans, the line he made famous and a morale booster to his troops: "NUTS!" That reply had to be explained, both to the Germans and to non-American Allies. (Note: Nuts can mean several things in American English slang. In this case it signified rejection, and was explained to the Germans as meaning "Go to Hell!")

Both 2nd Panzer and Panzer-Lehr division moved forward from Bastogne after 21 December, leaving only Panzer-Lehr division's 901st Regiment to assist the 26th Volksgrenadier-Division in attempting to capture the crossroads. The 26th VG received one Panzergrenadier Regiment from the 15th Panzergrenadier Division on Christmas Eve for its main assault the next day. Because it lacked sufficient troops and those of the 26th VG Division were near exhaustion, the XLVII Panzerkorps concentrated its assault on several individual locations on the west side of the perimeter in sequence rather than launching one simultaneous attack on all sides. The assault, despite initial success by its tanks in penetrating the American line, was defeated and all the tanks destroyed. On the following day of 26 December the spearhead of Gen. Patton's 4th Armored Division, supplemented by the 26th (Yankee) Infantry Division, broke through and opened a corridor to Bastogne. The Siege of Bastogne had lasted barely a week.

== Allied counterstrikes ==
On 23 December, the weather conditions started improving, allowing the Allied air forces to attack. They launched devastating bombing raids on the German supply points in their rear, and P-47 Thunderbolts started attacking the German troops on the roads. Allied air forces also helped the defenders of Bastogne, dropping much-needed supplies—medicine, food, blankets, and ammunition. A team of volunteer surgeons flew in by military glider and began operating in a tool room.

By 24 December, the German advance was effectively stalled short of the Meuse. Units of the British XXX Corps were holding the bridges at Dinant, Givet, and Namur and U.S. units were about to take over. The Germans had outrun their supply lines, and shortages of fuel and ammunition were becoming critical. Up to this point the German losses had been light, notably in armor, with the exception of Peiper's losses. On the evening of 24 December, Manteuffel recommended to Hitler's Military Adjutant a halt to all offensive operations and a withdrawal back to the Westwall (literally 'Western Rampart'). Hitler rejected this.

Disagreement and confusion at the Allied command prevented a strong response, throwing away the opportunity for a decisive action. In the center, on Christmas Eve, the 2nd Armored Division attempted to attack and cut off the spearheads of the 2nd Panzer Division at the Meuse, while the units from the 4th Cavalry Group kept the 9th Panzer Division at Marche busy. As a result, parts of the 2nd Panzer Division were cut off. The Panzer-Lehr division tried to relieve them, but was only partially successful, as the perimeter held. For the next two days the perimeter was strengthened. On 26 and 27 December the trapped units of 2nd Panzer Division made two break-out attempts, again only with partial success, as major quantities of equipment fell into Allied hands. Further Allied pressure out of Marche finally led the German command to the conclusion that no further offensive action towards the Meuse was possible.

In the south, Patton's Third Army was battling to relieve Bastogne. At 16:50 on 26 December, the lead element, Company D, 37th Tank Battalion of the 4th Armored Division, reached Bastogne, ending the siege.

== German supporting efforts across the Western Front ==
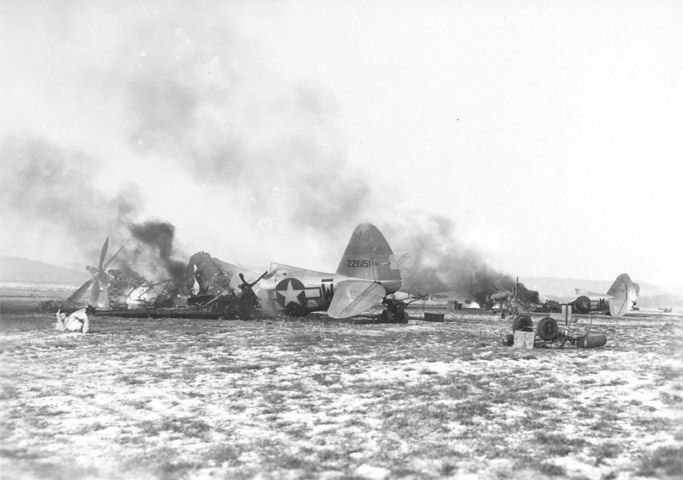
P-47s destroyed at Y-34 Metz-Frescaty airfield during Operation Bodenplatte

On 1 January, in an attempt to keep the offensive going, the Germans launched two new operations. At 09:15, the Luftwaffe launched Unternehmen Bodenplatte (Operation Baseplate), a major campaign against Allied airfields in the Low Countries. Hundreds of planes attacked Allied airfields, destroying or severely damaging some 465 aircraft. The Luftwaffe lost 277 planes, 62 to Allied fighters and 172 mostly because of an unexpectedly high number of Allied flak guns, set up to protect against German V-1 flying bomb/missile attacks and using proximity fused shells, but also by friendly fire from the German flak guns that were uninformed of the pending large-scale German air operation. The Germans suffered heavy losses at an airfield named Y-29, losing 40 of their own planes while damaging only four American planes. While the Allies recovered from their losses within days, the operation left the Luftwaffe ineffective for the remainder of the war.

On the same day, German Army Group G (Heeresgruppe G) and Army Group Upper Rhine (Heeresgruppe Oberrhein) launched a major offensive against the thinly-stretched, 110 kilometers (70 mi) line of the Seventh U.S. Army. This offensive, known as Unternehmen Nordwind (Operation North Wind), and separate from the Ardennes Offensive, was the last major German offensive of the war on the Western Front. The weakened Seventh Army had, at Eisenhower's orders, sent troops, equipment, and supplies north to reinforce the American armies in the Ardennes, and the offensive left it in dire straits.

By 15 January, Seventh Army's VI Corps was fighting on three sides in Alsace. With casualties mounting, and running short on replacements, tanks, ammunition, and supplies, Seventh Army was forced to withdraw to defensive positions on the south bank of the Moder River on 21 January. The German offensive drew to a close on 25 January. In the bitter, desperate fighting of Operation Nordwind, VI Corps, which had borne the brunt of the fighting, suffered a total of 14,716 casualties. The total for Seventh Army for January was 11,609. Total casualties included at least 9,000 wounded. First, Third, and Seventh Armies suffered a total of 17,000 hospitalized from the cold. (Note: A footnote in the U.S. Army's official history volume "Riviera to the Rhine" makes the following note on U.S. Seventh Army casualties: "As elsewhere, casualty figures are only rough estimates, and the figures presented are based on the postwar 'Seventh Army Operational Report, Alsace Campaign and Battle Participation, 1 June 1945' (copy CMH), which notes 11,609 Seventh Army battle casualties for the period, plus 2,836 cases of trench foot and 380 cases of frostbite, and estimates about 17,000 Germans killed or wounded with 5,985 processed prisoners of war. But the VI Corps AAR for January 1945 puts its total losses at 14,716 (773 killed, 4,838 wounded, 3,657 missing, and 5,448 nonbattle casualties); and Albert E. Cowdrey and Graham A. Cosmas, The Medical Department: The War Against Germany, draft CMH MS (1988), pp. 54–55, a forthcoming volume in the United States Army in World War II series, reports Seventh Army hospitals processing about 9,000 wounded and 17,000 'sick and injured' during the period. Many of these may have been returned to their units, and others may have come from American units operating in the Colmar area but still supported by Seventh Army medical services.")

== Allied counter-offensive ==
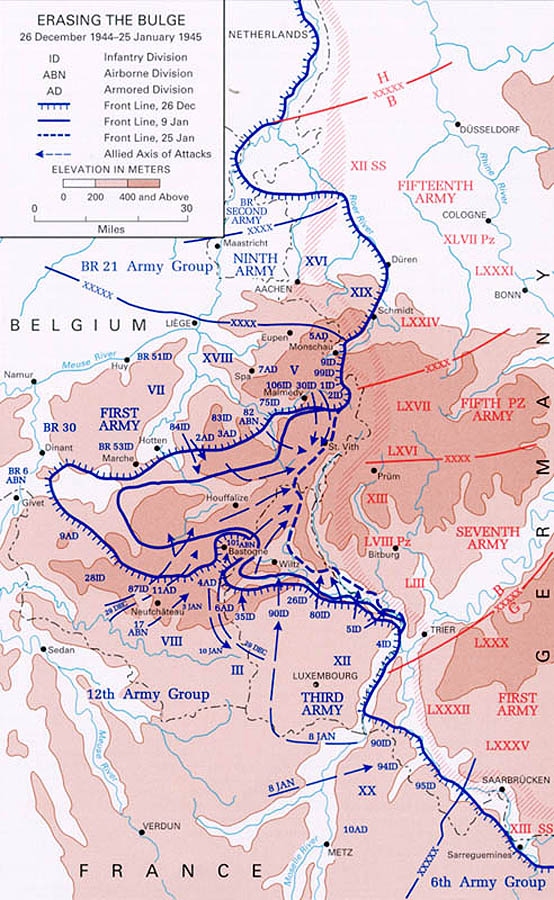
Erasing the Bulge—The Allied counterattack, 26 December – 25 January

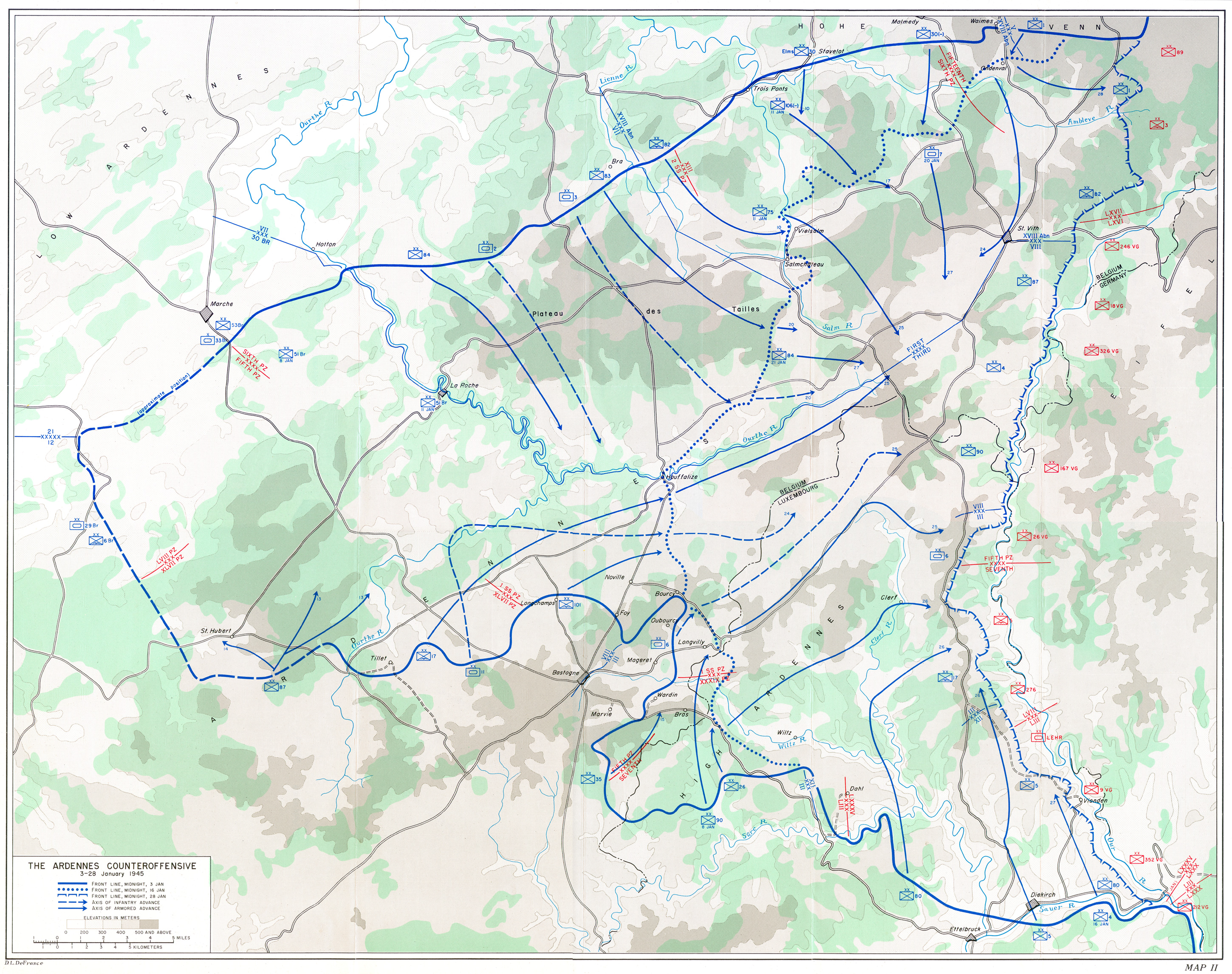
Allied offensive against Ardennes salient

While the German offensive toward the Meuse had ground to a halt by the end of December, they still controlled a dangerous salient in the Allied line. Patton's Third Army in the south, centered around Bastogne, would attack north, Montgomery's forces in the north would strike south, and the two forces planned to meet at Houffalize to reduce the bulge, and push east back toward the offensive start line.

The temperature during that January was extremely low, which required weapons to be maintained and truck engines run every half-hour to prevent their oil from congealing. The offensive went forward regardless.

Eisenhower wanted Montgomery to go on the counter offensive on 1 January, with the aim of meeting up with Patton's advancing Third Army and cutting off German troops at the tip of the salient, trapping them in a pocket. Montgomery, refusing to risk underprepared infantry in a snowstorm for a strategically unimportant area, did not launch the attack until 3 January. In addition, a series of renewed German attempts to re-encircle and seize Bastogne using units moved to the southern shoulder of the salient from the north, put Patton in a desperate fight for the initiative, with the German maintaining offensive operations in sectors north and east of Bastogne until 7 January, and resulting in heavier fighting than during the 21–26 December siege of Bastogne itself; in addition, Patton's Third Army would have to clear out the "Harlange Pocket" east of Bastogne on the Belgian-Luxembourg border. One of these fierce actions around Bastogne occurred on 2 January, the Tiger IIs of German Heavy Tank Battalion 506 supported an attack by the 12th SS Hitlerjugend division against U.S. positions of the 6th Armored Division near Wardin and knocked out 15 Sherman tanks.

At the start of the offensive, the First and Third U.S. Armies were separated by about 40 km (25 mi). American progress in the south was also restricted to about a kilometer or a little over half a mile per day.

On 7/8 January 1945, Hitler agreed to gradually withdraw forces from the tip of the Ardennes salient to east of Houffalize to avoid being cut off, but the Germans continued to resist in the salient and were only gradually pushed back otherwise. Considerable fighting went on for another 3 weeks, with Third Army and First Army linking up on 16 January with the capture of Houffalize. Sixth Panzer Army left the Ardennes and ceded its sector to the Fifth Panzer Army on 22 January, while St. Vith was recaptured by the Americans on 23 January, and the last German units participating in the offensive did not return to their start line until February.

Winston Churchill, addressing the House of Commons following the Battle of the Bulge said, "This is undoubtedly the greatest American battle of the war and will, I believe, be regarded as an ever-famous American victory."

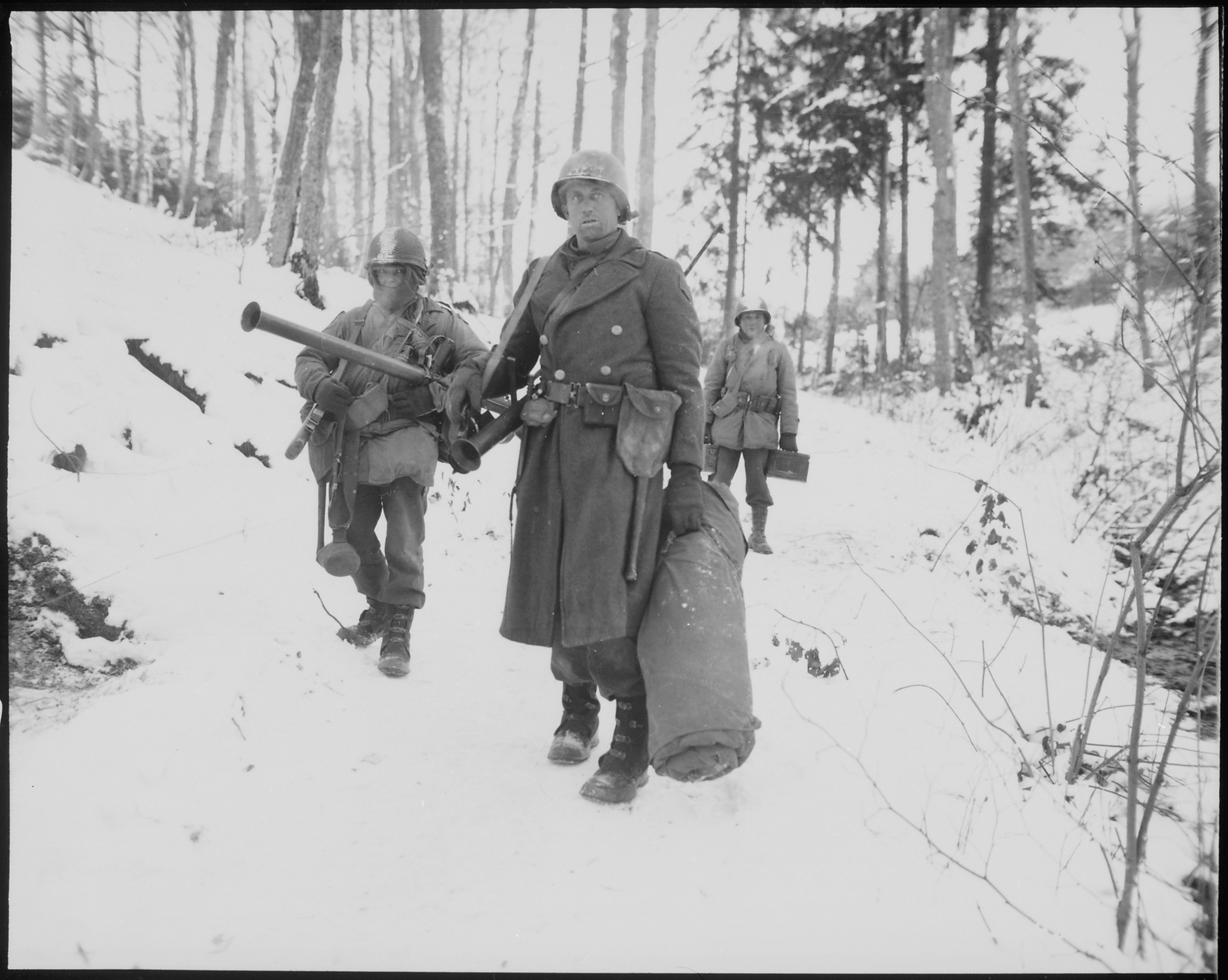
Americans of the 101st Engineers near Wiltz, Luxembourg, January 1945

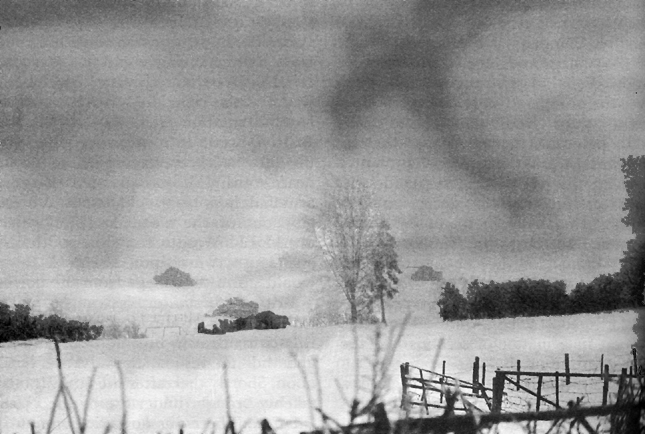
U.S. 6th Armored Division tanks moving near Wardin, Belgium, January 1945

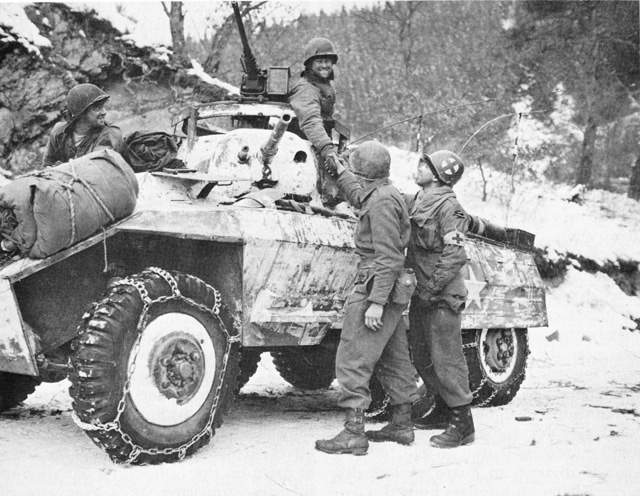
M8 armored car on patrol from U.S. 11th Armored Division, U.S. Third Army links up with soldiers of the U.S. 84th Infantry Division of U.S. First Army west of Houffalize, Belgium. 16 January 1945.

=== Chenogne massacre ===
After receiving news of the Malmedy massacre, during the counteroffensive at the southern shoulder on New Year's Day 1945, American soldiers of the inexperienced 11th Armored Division executed approximately sixty German prisoners of war near the Belgian village of Chenogne (8 km from Bastogne).

== Force comparisons by date ==
| Force | Allied | | | | Axis | | | |
| Date | 16 Dec | 24 Dec | 2 Jan | 16 Jan | 16 Dec | 24 Dec | 2 Jan | 16 Jan |
|---|---|---|---|---|---|---|---|---|
| Men | 228,741 | ~541,000 | ~705,000 | 700,520 | 406,342 | ~449,000 | ~401,000 | 383,016 |
| Tanks | 483 | 1,616 | 2,409 | 2,428 | 557 | 423 | 287 | 216 |
| Tank destroyers and assault guns (Note: For Allied forces, Dupuy counts light tanks with tank destroyers.) | 499 | 1,713 | 1,970 | 1,912 | 667 | 608 | 462 | 414 |
| Other AFVs | 1,921 | 5,352 | 7,769 | 7,079 | 1,261 | 1,496 | 1,090 | 907 |
| Anti-tank and artillery pieces | 971 | 2,408 | 3,305 | 3,181 | 4,224 | 4,131 | 3,396 | 3,256 |
| Armored divisions | 2 | 6 | 8 | 8 | 7 | 8 | 8 | 8 |
| Armored brigades | | 1 | 2 | 2 | 1 | 3 | 3 | 2 |
| Infantry divisions | 6 | 15 | 22 | 22 | 13 | 16 | 15 | 16 |

Initial and final manpower commitments for all units in Ardennes Campaign (Note: "Initial" is the sum total of all unit rosters of the respective combatants at the point at which those units entered the battle, while "Final" reflects the state of those units on 16 January 1945. For the strength of the opposing sides at any one time, see table above.)
| | American | British | German |
|---|---|---|---|
| Initial | 687,498 | 111,904 | 498,622 |
| Final | 680,706 | 111,100 | 425,941 |

== Strategy and leadership ==
=== Hitler's chosen few ===
The plan and timing for the Ardennes attack sprang from the mind of Adolf Hitler. He believed a critical fault line existed between the British and American military commands, and that a heavy blow on the Western Front would shatter this alliance. Planning for the "Watch on the Rhine" offensive emphasized secrecy and the commitment of overwhelming force. Due to the use of landline communications within Germany, motorized runners carrying orders, and draconian threats from Hitler, the timing and mass of the attack was not detected by Ultra codebreakers and achieved complete surprise.

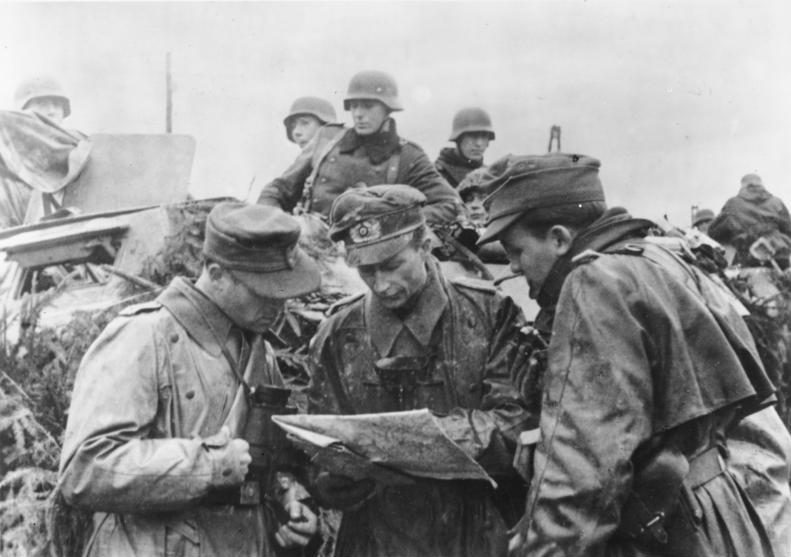
German field commanders plan the advance

After officers of the German Army attempted to assassinate him, Hitler had increasingly trusted only the SS and its armed branch, the Waffen-SS. He entrusted them with carrying out his decisive counterattack. But following the Allied Normandy invasion, the SS armored units had suffered significant leadership casualties. This included SS-Brigadeführer (Brigadier general) Kurt Meyer, commander of the 12th SS Panzer (Armor) Division, captured by Belgian partisans on 6 September 1944. Thus Hitler gave responsibility for the key right flank of the assault to the best SS troops and a few Volksgrenadier units under the command of "Sepp" (Joseph) Dietrich, a fanatical political disciple of Hitler, and a loyal follower from the early days of the rise of National Socialism in Germany. The leadership composition of the Sixth Panzer Army had a distinctly political nature.

Despite their loyalty, none of the German field commanders entrusted with planning and executing the offensive believed it was possible to capture Antwerp. Even Dietrich believed the Ardennes was a poor area for armored warfare and that the inexperienced and badly equipped Volksgrenadier soldiers would clog the roads the tanks needed for their rapid advance. In fact, their horse-drawn artillery and rocket units became a significant obstacle to the armored units. Other than making futile objections to Hitler in private, Dietrich generally stayed out of planning the offensive. Model and Manteuffel, technical experts from the eastern front, told Hitler that a limited offensive with the goal of surrounding and crushing the American 1st Army would be the best goal their offensive could hope to achieve. Their ideas shared the same fate as Dietrich's objections.

The German staff planning and organization of the attack was well done. Most of the units committed to the offensive reached their jump off points undetected. They were for the most part well organized and supplied for the attack, although they were counting on capturing American gasoline dumps to fuel their vehicles. As the battle ensued, on the northern shoulder of the offensive, Dietrich stopped the armored assault on the twin villages after two days and changed the axis of their advance southward through the hamlet of Domäne Bütgenbach. The headlong drive on Elsenborn Ridge lacked needed support from German units that had already bypassed the ridge. Dietrich's decision unknowingly played into American hands, as Robertson had already decided to abandon the villages.

=== Allied high-command controversy ===
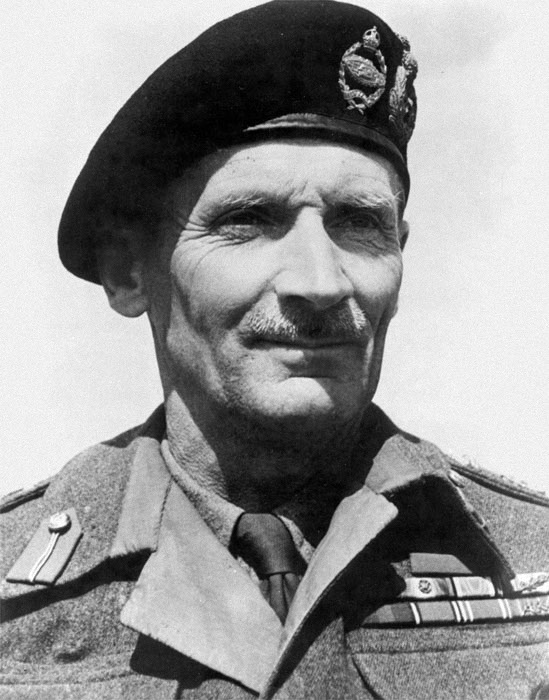
Field Marshal Montgomery

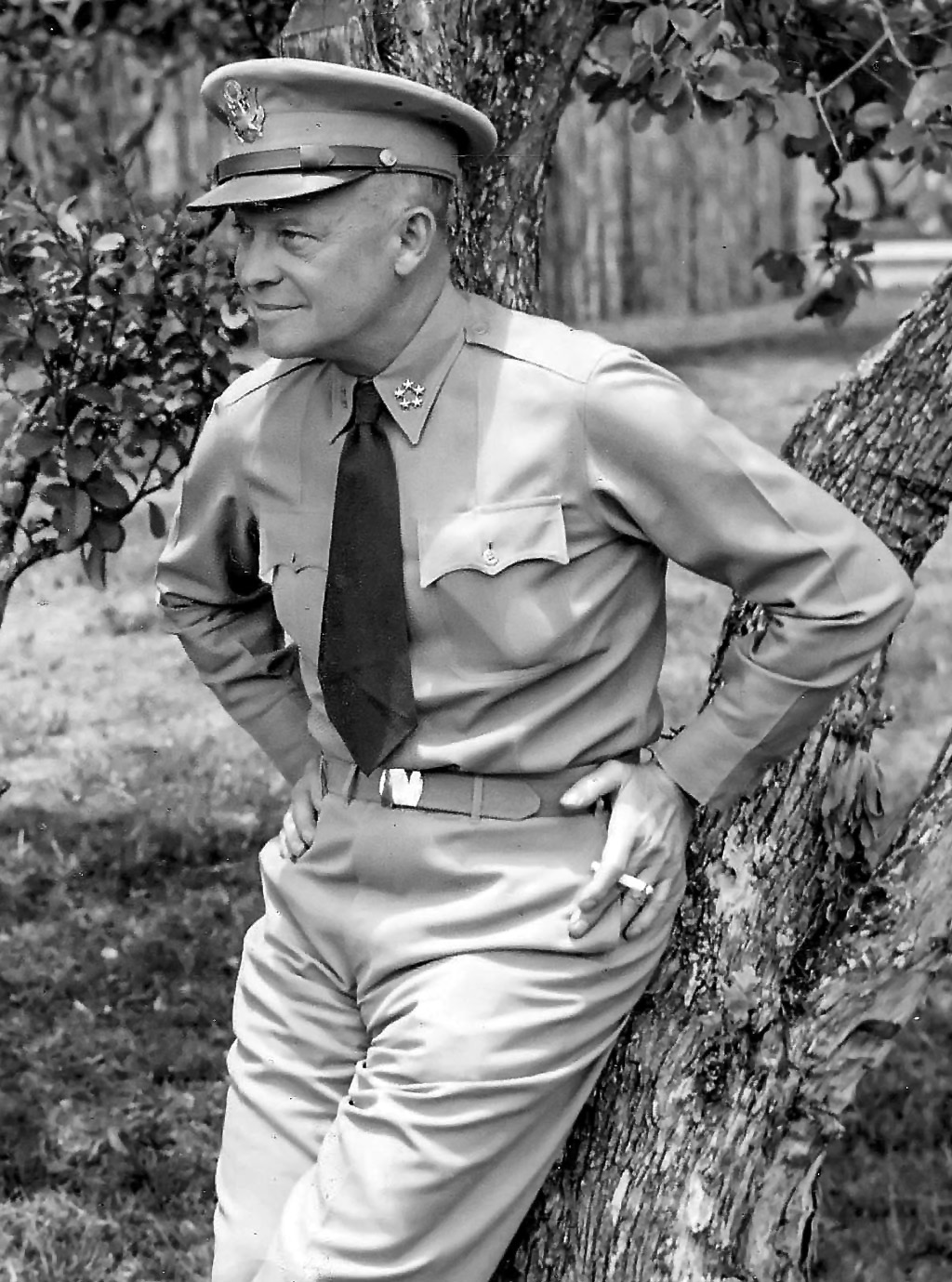
General Eisenhower, the Supreme Allied Commander

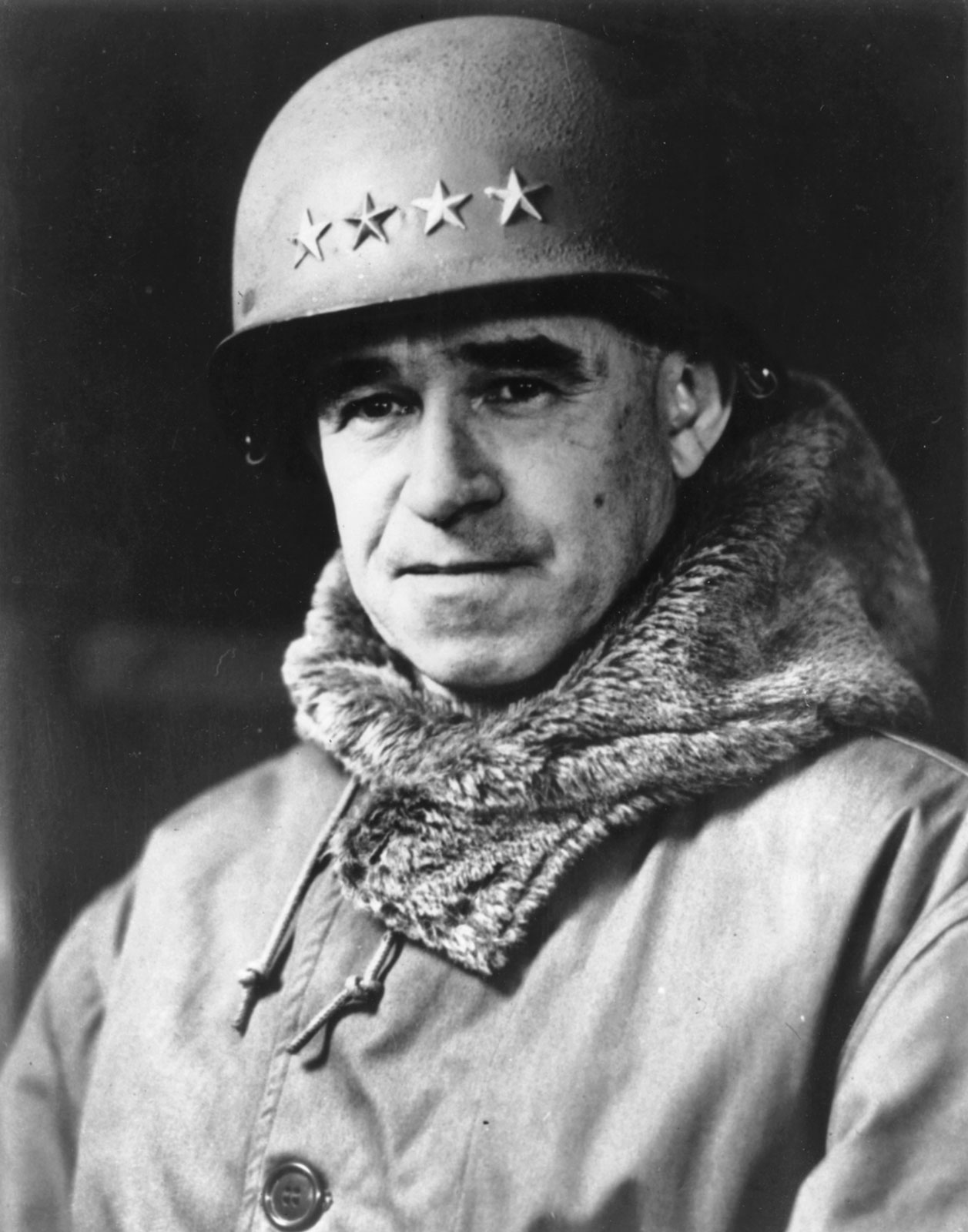
General Bradley

One of the fault lines between the British and American high commands was Eisenhower's commitment to a broad front advance. This view was opposed by the British Chief of the Imperial General Staff,(CIGS) Field Marshal Alan Brooke, as well as Field Marshal Montgomery, who promoted a rapid advance on a narrow front under his command, with the other allied armies in reserve.

Eisenhower based his decision on various military and political realities. The Allied occupation zones in Germany had been agreed upon in February 1944, and a faster Allied advance in the autumn of 1944 would not have altered this. The Soviet Union would have also benefited from a rapid German collapse, and its participation in the war against Japan was greatly desired. There were reservations about whether the Allied logistical system possessed the required flexibility to support the narrow-front strategy, the reality of terrain and logistics argued strongly against it, and the consequences if the narrow front advance had failed would have been very severe.

Major-General Francis "Freddie" de Guingand, Chief of Staff of Montgomery's 21st Army Group, stated in his post-war account that he had opposed Montgomery's narrow front strategy on political and administrative grounds.

=== Montgomery's actions ===
Montgomery differed from the U.S. command in how to respond to the German attack and his public statements to that effect caused tension in the American high command. Major-General Freddie de Guingand rose to the occasion, and personally smoothed over the disagreements on 30 December.

As the Ardennes crisis developed, the U.S. First Army (Hodges) and U.S. Ninth Army (Simpson) on the northern shoulder of the German penetration lost communications with adjacent armies, as well as with Bradley's headquarters in Luxembourg City to the south of the "bulge". Consequently, at 10:30 a.m. on 20 December, Eisenhower transferred the command of the U.S. First and Ninth Armies temporarily from Bradley to Montgomery. Command of the U.S. First Army reverted to the U.S. 12th Army Group on 17 January 1945, and command of the U.S. Ninth Army reverted to the U.S. 12th Army Group on 4 April 1945.

Montgomery wrote about the situation he found on 20 December:

The First Army was fighting desperately. Having given orders to Dempsey and Crerar, who arrived for a conference at 11 am, I left at noon for the H.Q. of the First Army, where I had instructed Simpson to meet me. I found the northern flank of the bulge was very disorganized. Ninth Army had two corps and three divisions; First Army had three corps and fifteen divisions. Neither Army Commander had seen Bradley or any senior member of his staff since the battle began, and they had no directive on which to work. The first thing to do was to see the battle on the northern flank as one whole, to ensure the vital areas were held securely, and to create reserves for counter-attack. I embarked on these measures: I put British troops under command of the Ninth Army to fight alongside American soldiers, and made that Army take over some of the First Army Front. I positioned British troops as reserves behind the First and Ninth Armies until such time as American reserves could be created. Slowly but surely the situation was held, and then finally restored. Similar action was taken on the southern flank of the bulge by Bradley, with the Third Army.

Due to the news blackout imposed on the 16th, the change of leadership to Montgomery did not become public information until SHAEF announced that the change in command had "absolutely nothing to do with failure on the part of the three American generals". The announcement resulted in headlines in British newspapers and Stars and Stripes, which for the first time mentioned British contributions to the fighting.

Montgomery requested permission from Churchill to give a press conference to explain the situation. Though some of his staff were concerned at how the press conference would affect Montgomery's image, it was cleared by CIGS Alan Brooke, who was possibly the only person from whom Montgomery would accept advice.

On the same day as Hitler's withdrawal order of 7 January, Montgomery held his press conference at Zonhoven. Montgomery started with giving credit to the "courage and good fighting quality" of the American troops, characterizing a typical American as a "very brave fighting man who has that tenacity in battle which makes a great soldier", and went on to talk about the necessity of Allied teamwork, and praised Eisenhower, stating, "Teamwork wins battles and battle victories win wars. On our team, the captain is General Ike."

Then Montgomery described the course of the battle for a half-hour. Coming to the end of his speech he said he had "employed the whole available power of the British Group of Armies; this power was brought into play very gradually ... Finally it was put into battle with a bang ... you thus have the picture of British troops fighting on both sides of the Americans who have suffered a hard blow." He stated that he (i.e., the German) was "headed off ... seen off ... and ... written off ... The battle has been the most interesting, I think possibly one of the most interesting and tricky battles I have ever handled."

Despite his positive remarks about American soldiers, the overall impression given by Montgomery, at least in the ears of the American military leadership, was that he had taken the lion's share of credit for the success of the campaign and had been responsible for rescuing the besieged Americans.

His comments were interpreted as self-promoting, particularly his claim that when the situation "began to deteriorate," Eisenhower had placed him in command in the north. Patton and Eisenhower both felt this was a misrepresentation of the relative share of the fighting played by the British and Americans in the Ardennes (for every British soldier there were thirty to forty Americans in the fight), and that it belittled the part played by Bradley, Patton and other American commanders. In the context of Patton's and Montgomery's well-known antipathy, Montgomery's failure to mention the contribution of any American general besides Eisenhower was seen as insulting. Indeed, Bradley and his American commanders were already starting their counterattack by the time Montgomery was given command of 1st and 9th U.S. Armies.

Focusing exclusively on his own generalship, Montgomery continued to say he thought the counteroffensive had gone very well but did not explain the reason for his delayed attack on 3 January. He later attributed this to needing more time for preparation on the northern front. According to Churchill, the attack from the south under Patton was steady but slow and involved heavy losses, and Montgomery was trying to avoid this situation. Morelock states that Monty was preoccupied with being allowed to lead a "single thrust offensive" to Berlin as the overall commander of Allied ground forces, and that he accordingly treated the Ardennes counteroffensive "as a sideshow, to be finished with the least possible effort and expenditure of resources."

Many American officers had already grown to dislike Montgomery, who was seen by them as an overly cautious commander, arrogant, and all too willing to say uncharitable things about the Americans. However, on 18 January 1945, Churchill stated to Parliament "the United States troops have done almost all the fighting". Adding "Care must be taken in telling our proud tale not to claim for the British Army an undue share of what is undoubtedly the greatest American battle of the war and will, I believe, be regarded as an ever famous American victory." ending that "General Omar Bradley was commanding American troops, and so was Field-Marshal Montgomery. All these troops fought in magnificent fashion and General Eisenhower, balancing the situation between his two commanders, gave them both the fairest opportunity to realise their full strength and quality. Let no one lend himself to the chatter of mischief-makers when issues of this most momentous consequence are being successfully decided by the sword"

Montgomery subsequently recognized his error and later wrote: "Not only was it probably a mistake to have held this conference at all in the sensitive state of feeling at the time, but what I said was skillfully distorted by the enemy." BBC correspondent Chester Wilmot explained that "my dispatch to the BBC about it was intercepted by the German wireless, re-written to give it an anti-American bias, and then broadcast by Arnhem Radio, which was then in Goebbels' hands. Monitored at Bradley's HQ, this broadcast was mistaken for a BBC transmission and it was this twisted text that started the uproar."

Montgomery later said, "Distorted or not, I think now that I should never have held that press conference. So great were the feelings against me on the part of the American generals that whatever I said was bound to be wrong. I should therefore have said nothing." Eisenhower commented in his own memoirs: "I doubt if Montgomery ever came to realize how resentful some American commanders were. They believed he had belittled them—and they were not slow to voice reciprocal scorn and contempt."

Bradley and Patton both threatened to resign unless Montgomery's command was changed. Eisenhower, encouraged by his British deputy Air Chief Marshall Sir Arthur Tedder, had decided to sack Montgomery. Intervention by Montgomery's and Eisenhower's Chiefs of Staff, Guingand, and Walter Smith, moved Eisenhower to reconsider and allowed Montgomery to apologize.

After the war Manteuffel, who commanded the 5th Panzer Army in the Ardennes, was imprisoned awaiting trial for war crimes. During this period he was interviewed by B. H. Liddell Hart, a British author who has since been accused of putting words in the mouths of German generals, and attempting to "rewrite the historical record". After conducting several interviews via an interpreter, Liddell Hart in a subsequent book attributed to Manteuffel the following statement about Montgomery's contribution to the battle in the Ardennes:

The operations of the American 1st Army had developed into a series of individual holding actions. Montgomery's contribution to restoring the situation was that he turned a series of isolated actions into a coherent battle fought according to a clear and definite plan. It was his refusal to engage in premature and piecemeal counter-attacks which enabled the Americans to gather their reserves and frustrate the German attempts to extend their breakthrough.

However, American historian Stephen Ambrose, writing in 1997, maintained that "Putting Monty in command of the northern flank had no effect on the battle". Ambrose wrote that: "Far from directing the victory, Montgomery had gotten in everyone's way, and had botched the counter-attack." Bradley blamed Montgomery's "stagnating conservatism" for his failure to counterattack when ordered to do so by Eisenhower. In contrast, historian Professor John Buckley, writing in 2013, noted how Montgomery "must take considerable credit" for stabilising the position, due to his "efficient and disciplined system of controlling or gripping subordinates".

== Casualties ==
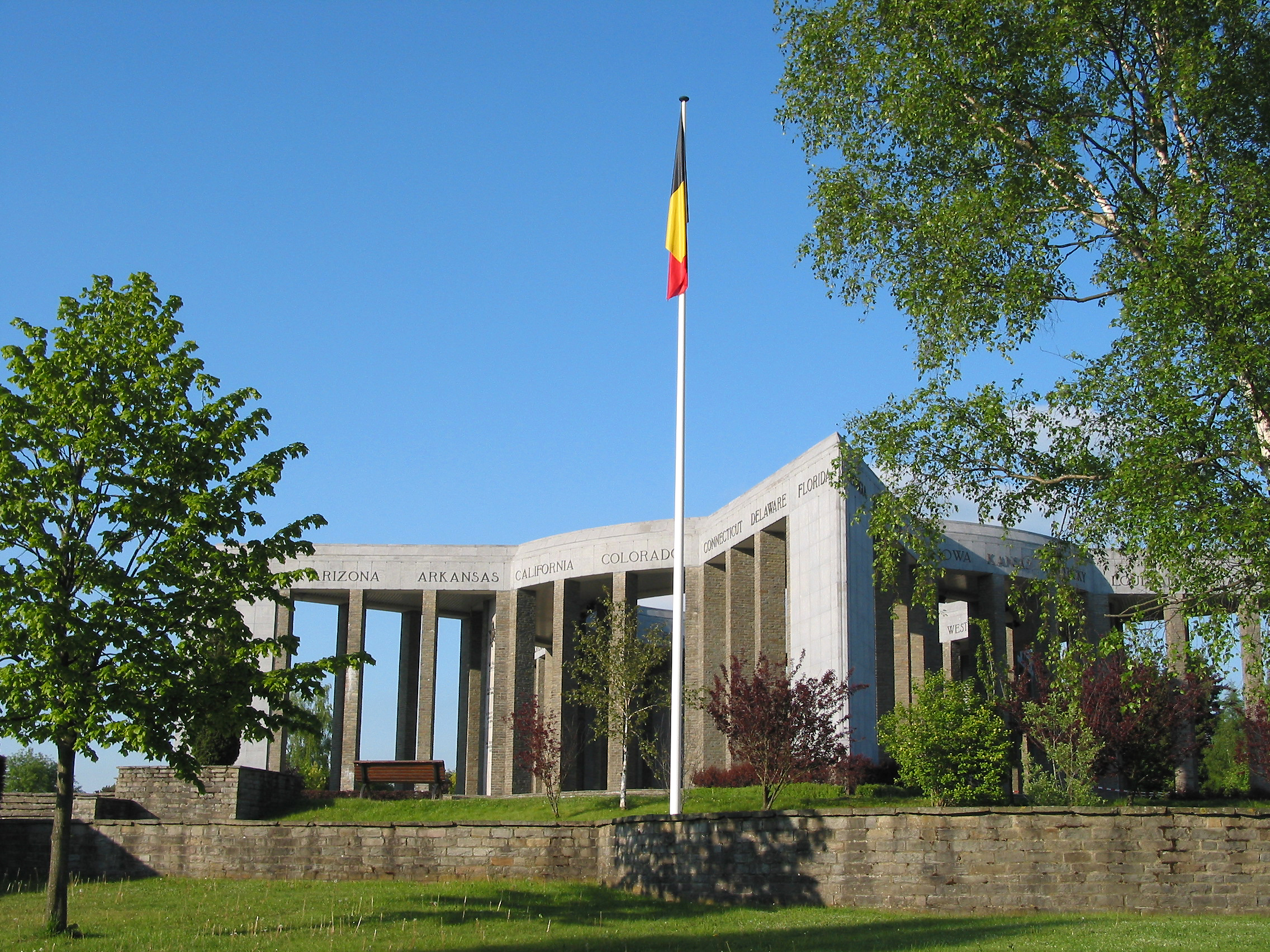
The Mardasson Memorial near Bastogne, Belgium

=== Allied ===
The Battle of the Bulge was the bloodiest battle for US forces during World War II. A preliminary Army report restricted to the First and Third US Armies listed 75,482 casualties (8,407 killed, 46,170 wounded and 20,905 missing); British XXX Corps losses to 17 January 1945 were recorded as 1,408 (200 killed, 969 wounded, and 239 missing.) T. N. Dupuy, David Bongard, and Richard Anderson list battle casualties for XXX Corps combat units as 1,462, including 222 killed, 977 wounded, and 263 missing to 16 January 1945 inclusive. Casualties among American divisions (excluding attached elements, corps and army-level combat support, and rear-area personnel) totaled 62,439 from 16 December 1944 to 16 January 1945, inclusive: 6,238 killed, 32,712 wounded, and 23,399 missing. Historian Charles B. MacDonald lists 81,000 American casualties, 41,315 during the defensive phase and 39,672 during the drive to flatten the "Bulge" through 28 January.

An official report by the United States Department of the Army lists 105,102 casualties for the entire "Ardennes-Alsace" campaign, including 19,246 killed, 62,489 wounded, and 26,612 captured or missing; this number incorporates losses not just for the Battle of the Bulge but also all losses suffered during the period by units with the "Ardennes-Alsace" battle credit (the entirety of US First, Third and Seventh Armies), which includes losses suffered during the German offensive in Alsace, Operation Nordwind as well as forces engaged in the Saar and Lorraine campaigns, and the Battle of Hürtgen Forest during that time period. For the period of December 1944 – January 1945 on the entire Western Front, Forrest Pogue gives a total of 28,178 US military personnel captured, including shot down airmen.

=== German ===
The German High Command estimated that they lost between 81,834 and 98,024 men on the Western Front between 16 December 1944 and 25 January 1945; the accepted figure was 81,834, of which 12,652 were killed, 38,600 were wounded, and 30,582 were missing. Allied estimates on German casualties range from 81,000 to 103,900. Some authors have estimated German casualties as high as 125,000:

- T. N. Dupuy's estimates based on fragmentary German records and oral testimony suggests casualties among divisions and brigades alone (excluding attached elements, corps and army-level combat support, and rear-area personnel) totaled 74,459 from 16 December 1944 to 16 January 1945, inclusive: 11,048 killed, 34,168 wounded, and 29,243 missing.
- German historian Hermann Jung lists 67,675 casualties from 16 December 1944 to late January 1945 for the three German armies that participated in the offensive.
- The German casualty reports for the involved armies count 63,222 losses from 10 December 1944 to 31 January 1945.
- The United States Army Center of Military History's official numbers are 75,000 American casualties and 100,000 German casualties.

Christer Bergström lists between 527 and 554 losses to all causes among German tanks, tank destroyers, and assault guns during the campaign, of which 324 were lost in combat. Of the German write-offs, 16–20 were Tigers, 191–194 Panthers, 141–158 Panzer IVs, and 179–182 were tank destroyers and assault guns. Hermann Jung gave figures for 600 German tanks across the entire Western Front from 16 December 1944, to 1 February 1945. Other sources place German losses in the range of 600–800: Magna E. Bauer's review of OKW records suggests 324 losses in December (77 Panzer IVs, 132 Panthers, 13 Tigers, and 102 assault guns) and even more in January. American losses over the same period were similarly heavy, totaling from 733 tanks and tank destroyers (exclusive of other types and losses suffered by British XXX Corps) to 800 in tanks alone.

== Result ==
Although the Germans managed to begin their offensive with complete surprise and enjoyed some initial successes, they were not able to seize the initiative on the Western Front. While the German command did not reach its goals, the Ardennes operation inflicted heavy losses and set back the Allied invasion of Germany by several weeks. The High Command of the Allied forces had planned to resume the offensive by early January 1945, after the wet season rains and severe frosts, but those plans had to be postponed until 29 January 1945 in connection with the unexpected changes in the front.

The Allies pressed their advantage following the battle. By the beginning of February 1945, the lines were roughly where they had been in December 1944. In early February, the Allies launched an attack all along the Western front: in the north under Montgomery, they fought Operation Veritable (also known as the Battle of the Reichswald); east of Aachen they fought the second phase of the Battle of Hürtgen Forest; in the center, under Hodges; and in the south, under Patton.

The German losses in the battle were especially critical: their last reserves were now gone, the Luftwaffe had been shattered, and remaining forces throughout the West were being pushed back to defend the Siegfried Line.

In response to the early success of the offensive, on 6 January Churchill contacted Stalin to request that the Soviet Union put pressure on the Germany on the Eastern Front. On 12 January, the Red Army began the massive Vistula–Oder offensive, originally planned for 20 January. It had been brought forward from 20 January to 12 January because meteorological reports warned of a thaw later in the month, and the tanks needed hard ground for the offensive (and the advance of the Red Army was assisted by two Panzer Armies (5th and 6th) being redeployed for the Ardennes attack).

Churchill was elated at Stalin's offer of help, thanking Stalin for the thrilling news.

During World War II, most U.S. black soldiers still served only in maintenance or service positions, or in segregated units. Because of troop shortages during the Battle of the Bulge, Eisenhower decided to integrate the service for the first time. This was an important step toward a desegregated United States military. More than 2,000 black soldiers had volunteered to go to the front. A total of 708 black Americans were killed in combat during World War II.

The Wehrmacht officially referred to the offensive by the codename Unternehmen Wacht am Rhein 'Operation Watch on the Rhine', while the Allies designated it the Ardennes Counteroffensive. The phrase "Battle of the Bulge" was coined by contemporary press to describe the bulge in German front lines on wartime news maps, (Note: David Eggenberger cites the official name as Ardennes-Alsace campaign, and describes this battle as the "Second Battle of the Ardennes".) and it became the most widely used name for the battle. The offensive was planned by the German forces with utmost secrecy, with minimal radio traffic and movements of troops and equipment under cover of darkness. Intercepted German communications indicating a substantial German offensive preparation were not acted upon by the Allies.

== Media attention ==
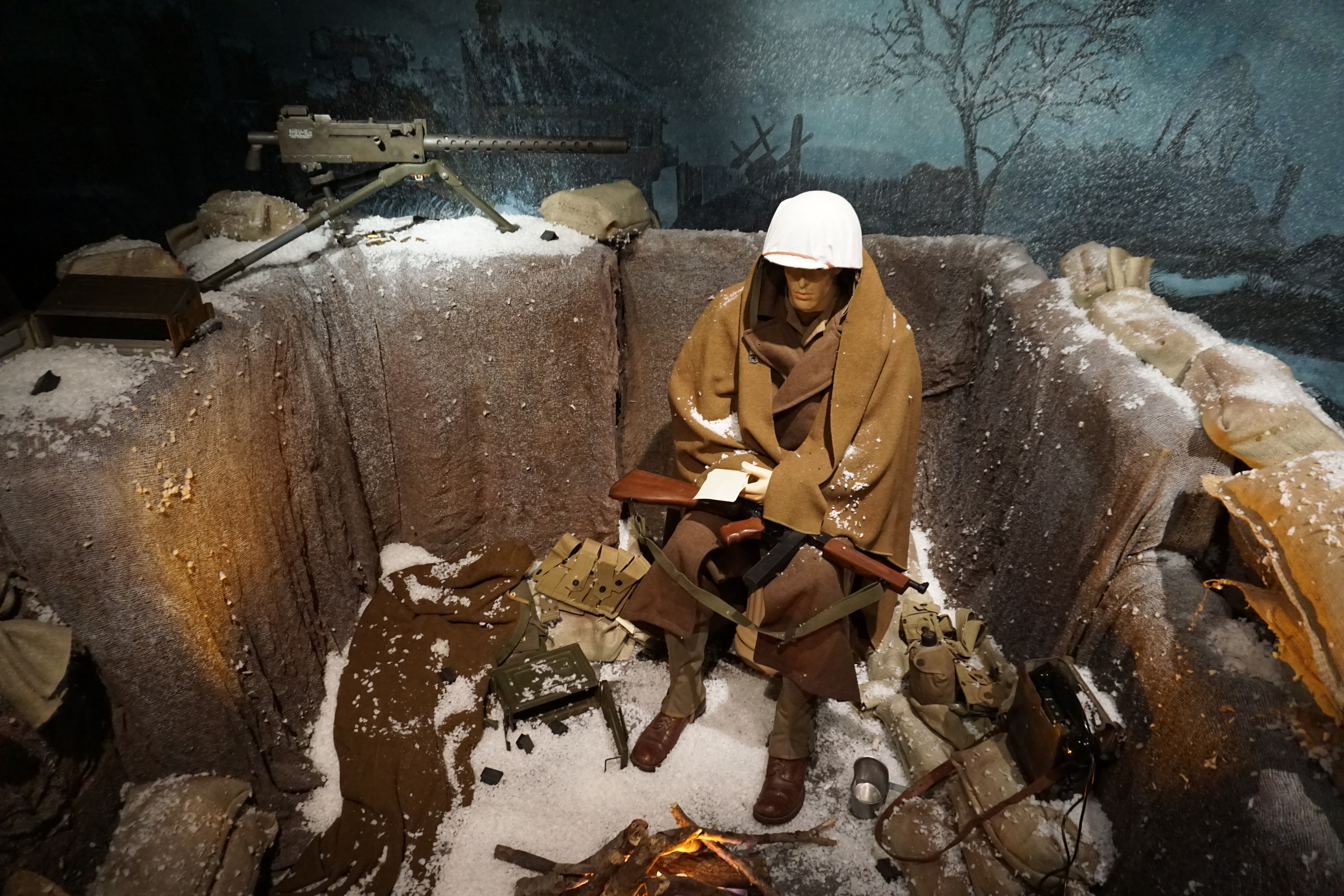
The Battle of the Bulge diorama at the Audie Murphy American Cotton Museum

The battle around Bastogne received a great deal of media attention because in early December 1944 it was a rest and recreation area for many war correspondents. The rapid advance by the German forces who surrounded Bastogne, the spectacular resupply operations via parachute and glider, along with the fast action of General Patton's Third US Army, all were featured in newspaper articles and on radio and captured the public's imagination; there were no correspondents in the area of Saint-Vith, Elsenborn, or Monschau-Höfen.

== Bletchley Park post-mortem ==
=== Missed indicators ===
At Bletchley Park, F. L. Lucas and Peter Calvocoressi of Hut 3 were tasked by General Nye (as part of the enquiry set up by the Chiefs of Staff) with writing a report on the lessons to be learned from the handling of pre-battle Ultra. The report concluded that "the costly reverse might have been avoided if Ultra had been more carefully considered". "Ultra intelligence was plentiful and informative" though "not wholly free from ambiguity", "but it was misread and misused". Lucas and Calvocoressi noted that "intelligence staffs had been too apt to assume that Ultra would tell them everything". Among the signs misread were the formation of the new 6th Panzer Army in the build-up area (west bank of the Rhine about Cologne); the new 'Star' (signals control-network) noted by the 'Fusion Room' traffic-analysts, linking "all the armoured divisions [assembling in the build-up area], including some transferred from the Russian front"; the daily aerial reconnaissance of the lightly defended target area by new Arado Ar 234 jets "as a matter of greatest urgency"; the marked increase in railway traffic in the build-up area; the movement of 1,000 trucks from the Italian front to the build-up area; disproportionate anxiety about tiny hitches in troop movements, suggesting a tight timetable; the quadrupling of Luftwaffe fighter forces in the West; and decrypts of Japanese diplomatic signals from Berlin to Tokyo, mentioning "the coming offensive".

=== SHAEF failures ===
For its part, Hut 3 had grown "shy of going beyond its job of amending and explaining German messages. Drawing broad conclusions was for the intelligence staff at SHAEF, who had information from all sources," including aerial reconnaissance. (Note: Calvocoressi to Neil Leslie Webster) Lucas and Calvocoressi added that "it would be interesting to know how much reconnaissance was flown over the Eiffel sector on the U.S. First Army Front". E. J. N. Rose, head Air Adviser in Hut 3, read the paper at the time and described it in 1998 as "an extremely good report" that "showed the failure of intelligence at SHAEF and at the Air Ministry". Lucas and Calvocoressi "expected heads to roll at Eisenhower's HQ, but they did no more than wobble".

Five copies of a report by the Chief of the Secret Intelligence Service – Indications of the German Offensive of December 1944, derived from ULTRA material, submitted to DMI – were issued on 28 December 1944. Copy No. 2 is held by the UK National Archives as file HW 13/45. It sets out the various indications of an impending offensive that were received, then offers conclusions about the wisdom conferred by hindsight; the dangers of becoming wedded to a fixed view of the enemy's likely intentions; over-reliance on "Source" (i.e. ULTRA); and improvements in German security. It also stresses the role played by poor Allied security: "The Germans have this time prevented us from knowing enough about them; but we have not prevented them knowing far too much about us".

== Battle credit ==
After the war ended, the U.S. Army issued battle credit in the form of the Ardennes-Alsace campaign citation to units and individuals that took part in operations in northwest Europe. The citation covered troops in the Ardennes sector where the main battle took place, as well as units further south in the Alsace sector, including those in the northern Alsace who filled in the vacuum created by the U.S. Third Army racing north, engaged in the concurrent Operation Nordwind diversion in central and southern Alsace launched to weaken Allied response in the Ardennes, and provided reinforcements to units fighting in the Ardennes.

== See also ==
- Battle of Garfagnana – 1944 battle in Italy during World War II
- German occupation of Luxembourg during World War II – Nazi control of Luxembourg, 1940–1945
- Liberation of France – End of Nazi occupation during World War II
- Operation Spring Awakening – Last major German offensive on the Eastern Front of World War II
- Christmas Eve truce of 1944
