= Gustav Knittel =

German SS Commander and convicted war criminal

- Born: 27 November 1914; Neu-Ulm, Kingdom of Württemberg, German Empire
- Died: 30 June 1976 (aged 61); Ulm, Baden-Württemberg, West Germany
- Military career
- Allegiance: Germany
- Branch: Waffen SS
- Service years: 1933–45
- Rank: SS-Sturmbannführer
- Unit: SS Division Leibstandarte
- Conflicts: World War II
- Awards: Knight's Cross of the Iron Cross

Gustav Knittel (27 November 1914 – 30 June 1976) was a Sturmbannführer (major) in the SS Division Leibstandarte (LSSAH) who was awarded the Knight's Cross of the Iron Cross. Sentenced to life imprisonment for ordering the illegal executions of 8 American prisoners of war, he was released in 1953.

== World War II ==
Born in 1914, Gustav Knittel volunteered for the SS on 15 April 1933 and the Nazi Party on 1 May 1933. In August 1934, Knittel joined the Nazi Party's paramilitary force, which later became the Waffen-SS. He attended the SS-Junkerschule Bad Tölz as an SS officer candidate on 1 October 1937 and successfully took his final exams on 28 July 1938. Subsequent Knittel was sent on a platoon leader course at SS training camp Dachau adjacent to the infamous Dachau concentration camp. On 9 November 1938 he was inducted as SS-Untersturmführer. With the SS-Regiment Deutschland, Knittel took part in the occupation of the Sudetenland after the Munich Agreement. He served with various SS units before becoming adjutant of SS Reserve Battalion Ellwangen in August 1939. Serving with the Leibstandarte Division, Knittel took part in the Battle of France. He was then posted as commander of the heavy company in the reconnaissance battalion of the LSSAH.

After taking part in the German attack on Yugoslavia and the Battle for Greece he next participated in Operation Barbarossa, the German invasion of the Soviet Union. He led his company during the drive of the Leibstandarte on Zhytomyr; he was wounded on 11 July 1941. After recovery, he was posted to the SS Training camp Dachau. He was awarded the Iron Cross 1st class and returned to his company in November.

=== Kharkov battles ===
In March 1942 he was appointed as the company commander of the armored halftrack company in the Reconnaissance Battalion LSSAH. Knittel led this company during the Third Battle of Kharkov and distinguished himself between 2 and 4 February 1943. On 2 February 1943 he received orders to lead an ad hoc battlegroup and move behind enemy lines to cover the retreat of the 298 Infantry Division. He made contact with this division in Shevchenkove, was cut off by the advancing Red Army but fought his way back to the German lines with his battlegroup and a group of Wehrmacht soldiers. When the reconnaissance battalion of LSSAH was encircled in Alexejewka, Knittel led one of the counterattacks against the Red Army on 13 February. On 15 February Meyer and Wünsche wanted to reach the German lines held by Fritz Witt. Knittel with his company was sent to Bereka to reconnoitre the planned route. He found Bereka occupied by the Red Army and he was wounded in the following attack. The next day the combined battlegroup of Meyer and Wünsche reached Yefremivka.

=== Massacre of civilians ===
Ukrainian sources, including surviving witness Ivan Kiselev, who was 14 at the time of the massacre, described the killings at the villages of Yefremovka and Semyonovka on 17 February 1943. On 12 February the LSSAH occupied the two villages, where retreating Soviet Army forces had wounded two SS troops. In retaliation, five days later LSSAH troops killed 872 men, women and children. Some 240 of these were burned alive in the church of Yefremovka. Knittel could not have participated in the massacre: the casualty reports of the Aufklärungsabteilung 'LSSAH' and his medical records kept by the Deutsche Dienststelle (WASt) show that due to the bullet wound in his thigh incurred in front of Bereka on 15 February he was hospitalized in Krasnohrad on 16 February 1943 and was transferred to a field hospital in Poltava on 18 February.

=== Battle of the Bulge ===
Divisional commander Wilhelm Mohnke ordered Knittel to return to the Leibstandarte. On 13 December 1944 he arrived at the divisional headquarters near Euskirchen where he asked Mohnke to grant Emil Wawrzinek the command of the 1st SS reconnaissance Battalion LSSAH. Wawrzinek had led the battalion since its return from France and had rebuilt it during the past months. But the next day Mohnke insisted that Knittel lead the reinforced battalion that would become Schnelle Gruppe (fast group) Knittel.

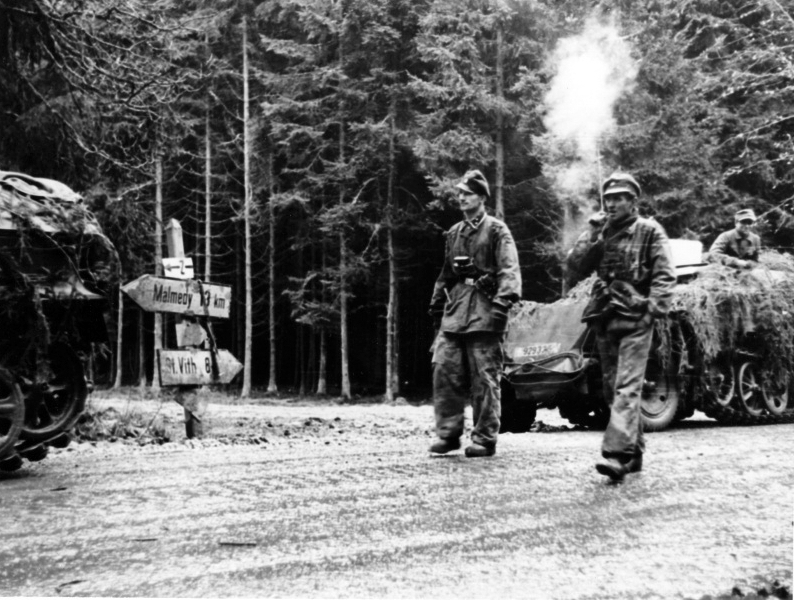
Kampfgruppe Knittel's troops on the road to Stavelot to support Peiper

That same day, 14 December, Knittel was briefed about the upcoming Operation Wacht am Rhein, the German attempt to break through the American lines and cut the allied forces in two. With the Leibstandarte as spearhead of the 6th Panzer Army of Sepp Dietrich Schnelle Gruppe Knittel was to follow the battlegroups of Joachim Peiper and Max Hansen, then use its speed to capture a bridge across the Meuse River south of Liège enabling the Leibstandarte to move toward Antwerp. On 15 December Knittel was further briefed at the headquarters of Hermann Prieß, the commanding officer of the 1st SS-Panzerkorps. During this briefing Otto Skorzeny was introduced and the details of Operation Greif were revealed. After this meeting Knittel drove to the command post of his battalion in Glaadt to pass the orders and specifics on to his company commanders.

The offensive started the next day, 16 December 1944. Initially Knittel advanced quickly, following in the wake of Peiper and Hansen without enemy contact, through Hallschlag, Manderfeld, Holzheim, Honsfeld, Heppenbach, Amel and Born. On 17 December a scouting party of Schnelle Gruppe Knittel murdered eleven African-American soldiers of the 333rd Artillery Battalion in Wéreth.

On 18 December it became clear that Peiper made the best progress and Mohnke ordered Knittel to follow that battlegroup. After a short meeting with Hansen in Recht, Knittel moved to Stavelot. After leaving instructions for his company commanders he crossed the Amblève River bridge in Stavelot at noon to contact Peiper in La Gleize. Elements of his battlegroup followed during the afternoon and early evening but the American 30th Infantry Division recaptured the northern part of the town, blocking the advance route of the rest of Schnelle Gruppe Knittel and the battlegroup of Rudolf Sandig. The next day, 19 December, Mohnke ordered Knittel and the elements of his fast group that did manage to reach La Gleize back to Stavelot to recapture the town and open the advance route which was also essential in supplying battlegroup Peiper with fuel and ammunition. Knittel set up his command post in the Antoine Farm west of Stavelot. The counterattack he deployed failed and that day members of his battalion murdered civilians in Trois-Ponts, Parfondruy, Renardmont and Stavelot. That evening, the Americans demolished the bridge in Stavelot.

Increased pressure from American forces stalled the advance of the Leibstandarte and continued attempts from Knittel and Sandig to recapture Stavelot failed while Peiper had come to a halt in La Gleize. The elements of Schnelle Gruppe Knittel on the western bank of the Amblève River were trapped between Stavelot, Coo and Trois-Ponts. On 20 December US Taskforce Lovelady from 3rd Armored Division attacked Knittel's positions from the direction of Trois-Ponts but was halted by a King Tiger tank and some anti-tank guns positioned near Petit-Spay. That evening elements from the 82nd Airborne Division moved in on the positions near Petit-Spay and cut off the road to Wanne. On 21 December elements of the 3rd Armored Division pushed Schnelle Gruppe Knittel out of its positions in Ster, but elements of Kampfgruppe Hansen had reached Petit-Spay during the night, and their counterattack pushed the 82nd Airborne Division back to Trois-Ponts. On 22 December a major attack from the 30th Infantry Division threw Knittel's men out of their positions at the western edge of Stavelot.

It had become clear that the Meuse River could not be reached and Peiper decided on 23 December to abandon his vehicles and retreat through the woods to escape capture. He left La Gleize with the remaining men. 36 hours later he reached the German lines at Petit-Spay and then Wanne. In the early morning of 25 December Knittel cleared his positions on the western bank of the Amblève River and withdrew his men to Wanne. There the Leibstandarte regrouped before moving to the Bastogne area. The Ardennes Offensive ended for Knittel when airplanes from the American 9th Tactical Airforce bombed his command post near Vielsalm on 31 December 1944. He was hospitalized in Germany with serious concussion.

== Trial and conviction ==
In May 1945 Knittel returned to his family in Neu-Ulm but soon decided to hide on a farm near Stuttgart. He returned to his hometown later that year but when he met with his wife on 5 January 1946 he was captured by Counter Intelligence Corps (CIC) agents Michel Thomas and Theodore Kraus. Knittel was detained by the CIC in Ulm and interrogated by Thomas. Knittel later claimed that he was physically abused by his guards, which Thomas denied.

In March, Knittel was transferred to Schwäbisch Hall, where Peiper and the other suspects of the Malmedy massacre were detained. Knittel and his Schnelle Gruppe had not taken part in the Malmedy Massacre since they had used a more southerly route. However, Knittel was questioned about war crimes in the Stavelot area. Knittel confessed that on 21 December 1944 he had ordered the murder of eight American prisoners of war at the command post of his heavy company near Petit-Spay, east of Trois-Ponts. Following his self-incriminating confession, (and despite "fully expecting and accepting that he would shortly be executed"), he was sentenced to life imprisonment on 16 July 1946 during the Malmedy massacre trial.

Knittel and his lawyers immediately filed a request with the War Crimes Board of Review to have his case reopened. He retracted his confession and, like other defendants, complained that the interrogations included psychological torture. Knittel claimed to have been threatened with being handed over to the Belgians and that his interrogators suggested that signing a confession or not was the choice between fair American justice and Belgian revenge. Knittel complained that his defence lawyers had not been allowed to use the war diaries of the American units which had opposed his Schnelle Gruppe during the Battle of the Bulge to prove that no Americans were murdered at the date and location he gave in his confession. However, the war diary of the 82nd Airborne Division shows that on 21 December 1944, during the battle between elements of Schnelle Gruppe Knittel and the 505th Parachute Infantry Regiment between Trois-Ponts and Petit-Spay, an eight-man strong bazooka team was captured by the Germans less than a mile away from the command post described by Knittel in his confession.

Unaware of the contents of the war diary of the 82nd Airborne Division, in March 1948 the reviewing authority reduced his sentence to 15 years imprisonment. In May 1948 the War Crimes Review Board Nr. 4 rejected the claim that irregularities had occurred during the trial against Knittel but following the Simpson Report and the findings of the United States Senate Committee on Armed Services his sentence was further reduced to 12 years imprisonment. Knittel was released from Landsberg Prison on 7 December 1953 following a Christmas amnesty.

Knittel later worked as a car salesman for Opel in Ulm until health problems, including several cardiac arrests, forced him to retire in 1970. Knittel died on 30 June 1976 in Ulm hospital.

== Summary of SS career ==
Dates of rank

- Adjutant SS-Kradschützen-Reserve Battalion "Ellwangen": 26 August 1939 – May 1940
- Platoon Commander 15 Company/LSSAH, 15 May – 19 August 1940
- Commander 4th Company, 1st Reconnaissance Battalion LSSAH, 19 August 1940 – March 1942
- Commander 3rd Company 1st Reconnaissance Battalion LSSAH, March 1942 – April 1943
- Commander 1st SS Panzer Reconnaissance Battalion LSSAH, 22 April 1943 – August 1944
- Commander SS Field Reserve Battalion LSSAH, November 1944 – 12 December 1944
- Commander 1st SS Panzer Reconnaissance Battalion, 1st SS Panzer Division LSSAH, 14 December 1944 – 31 December 1944 (wounded)

Awards

- German Cross in Gold on 23 January 1944 as SS-Sturmbannführer in the SS-Panzer-Aufklärungs-Abteilung 1 "Leibstandarte SS Adolf Hitler"
- Knight's Cross of the Iron Cross on 4 June 1944 as SS-Sturmbannführer and commander of SS-Panzer-Aufklärungs-Abteilung 1 "Leibstandarte SS Adolf Hitler".
