= Malmedy massacre trial =

Trial of WWII Nazi Germany war criminal soldiers

Coordinates: 48°16′13″N 11°28′05″E

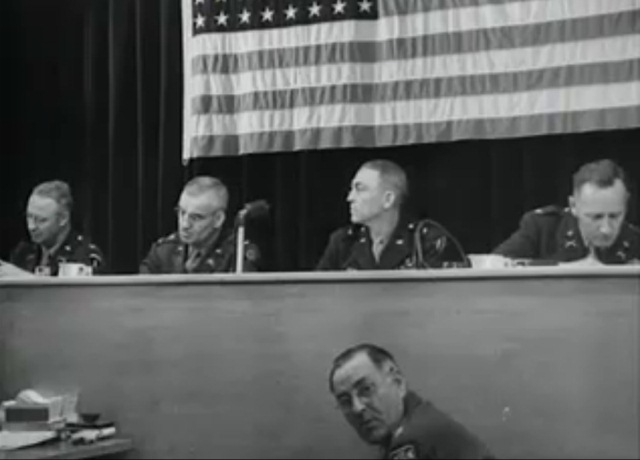
General Josiah Dalby (with head turned) presides over the Malmedy massacre trial at Dachau

The Malmedy massacre trial (U.S. vs. Valentin Bersin, et al.) was held in May–July 1946 in the former Dachau concentration camp to try the German Waffen-SS soldiers accused of the Malmedy massacre of 17 December 1944. The highest-ranking defendant was the former Waffen-SS general Sepp Dietrich.

== Malmedy massacre ==
The Malmedy massacre (17 December 1944) was a series of war crimes committed by the Waffen-SS Kampfgruppe Peiper against American prisoners of war and Belgian civilians during the Battle of the Bulge (16 December 1944 – 25 January 1945). The Waffen-SS massacre of 84 U.S. Army POWs near Baugnez was the primary subject of the trial, one of a series of war crimes that the Waffen-SS Kampfgruppe Peiper committed between mid-December 1944 and mid-January 1945. In the course of their massacres, the Waffen-SS murdered POWs with close-range gunshots to the head; the actual number of dead was 362 American POWs and 111 Belgian civilians.

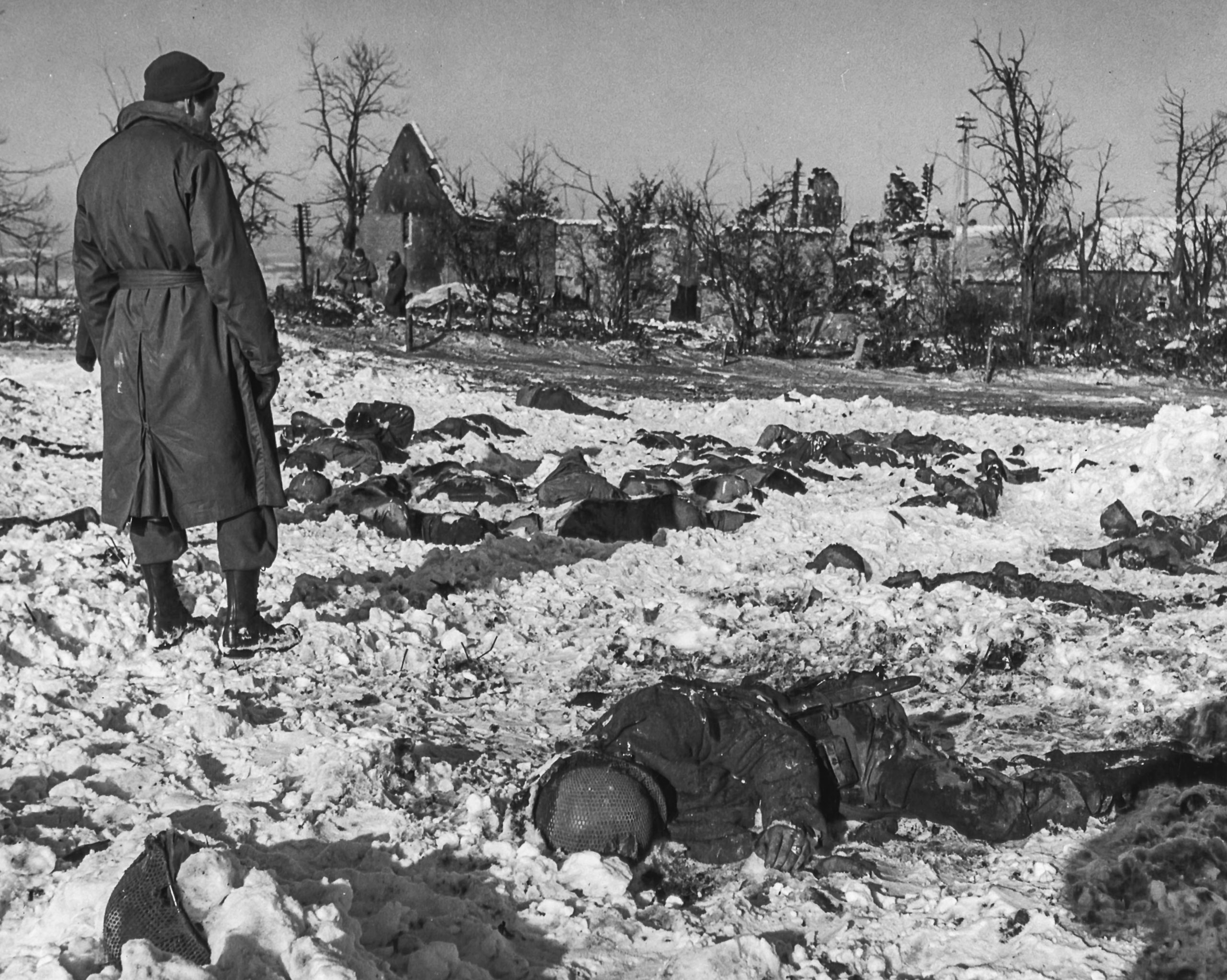
The corpses of the U.S. soldiers murdered by the Waffen-SS in the Malmedy massacre were covered and preserved with snow until Allied forces recaptured the area in January 1945.

The U.S. soldiers who survived the Malmedy massacre said that on 17 December 1944, in the vicinity of Baugnez, the armored advance of the Waffen-SS Kampfgruppe Peiper surprised approximately 120 U.S. Army soldiers from the 285th Field Artillery Observation Battalion (FAOB) who surrendered after a brief battle. The Waffen-SS then assembled their U.S. POWs in a field near the Baugnez crossroads, and then used machine guns to kill them.

The SS machine gun fire alerted and panicked the U.S. Army POWs; some soldiers fled the killing field, other soldiers were killed where they stood; and other soldiers ran to and hid in a café at the Baugnez crossroads, which the Waffen-SS soldiers set afire, and then shot dead every U.S. soldier who tried to escape the burning building. Meanwhile, at the killing field, the Waffen-SS soldiers walked among the American corpses to find and kill any G.I. pretending to be dead. Among the 84 murdered soldiers, many corpses had head-shot wounds consistent with a massacre rather than with wounds suffered in self-defense or with wounds suffered while escaping summary execution by machine gun.

On 13 January 1945, the U.S. Army secured the crossroads at Baugnez where the Waffen-SS Kampfgruppe Peiper had massacred their U.S. Army POWs. The corpses of the soldiers of the 285th Field Artillery Observation Battalion were recovered on 14–15 January 1945; the winter weather preserved the flesh and the wounds. The autopsies revealed that approximately twenty of the murdered American soldiers had close-range gunshot wounds to the head — the coup de grâce that ends the life of a fatally-wounded soldier. The head-shot wounds were additional to the gunshot wounds made by the machine guns of the initial gunfire of the massacre. Twenty other soldier corpses showed small-calibre gunshot wounds to the head, without powder-burn residue; 10 corpses had blunt-trauma injuries, likely from having been butt-stroked to death; some corpses showed a single gunshot wound, either to the temple or behind the ear.

U.S. Army investigators established that most of the G.I. corpses were in a very small area, which location suggested that the Waffen-SS had assembled and summarily executed their U.S. POWs as quickly as possible after capture. Later, under custody of the U.S. Army, Waffen-SS POWs testified that some American POWs had tried to escape the shootings; other Waffen-SS POWs said that some of the American POWs had recovered their own weapons, and then fired upon Waffen-SS soldiers en route to Ligneuville.

== Trial proceedings ==
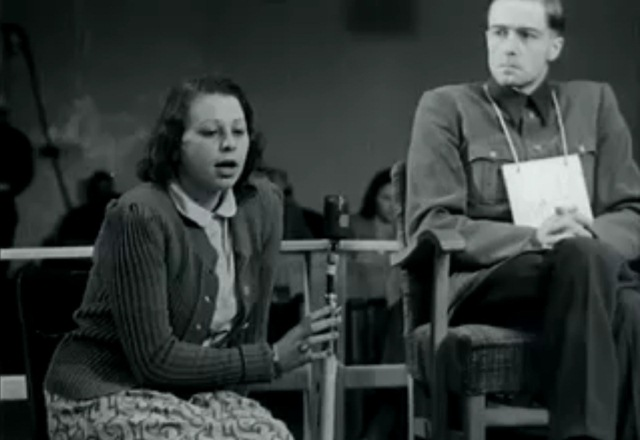
The Malmedy Massacre Trial: Waffen-SS Lt. Col. Joachim Peiper testifies through his interpreter about his participation in the Malmedy Massacre (1944).

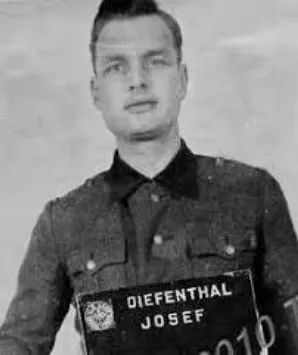
Defendant Josef-Diefenthal sentenced to death but later released

The trial of US vs. Valentin Bersin et al., Case Number 6-24 (May–July 1946), was one of the Dachau Trials that were held from 1945 to 1947. The tribunal of U.S. Army officers tried 74 Waffen-SS officers and soldiers, most of whom had been members of the 1st SS Division Adolf Hitler Bodyguard. The defendants included SS-Oberst-Gruppenführer Sepp Dietrich, commander of the 6th Panzer Army, SS-Brigadeführer Fritz Krämer, SS-Gruppenführer Hermann Priess, commander of the I SS Panzer Corps, and SS-Obersturmbannführer Joachim Peiper, commander of the 1st SS Panzer Regiment – the principal unit of Kampfgruppe Peiper, who committed the massacre at Malmedy, Belgium.

There were originally 75 suspects. However, one of them, 18-year-old Arvid Freimuth, killed himself before the trial started. Another, Marcel Boltz, had his case withdrawn upon the request of the French government since he was a French national. They were going to prosecute Boltz themselves, but dropped the case since they didn't think the evidence was strong enough.

Col. Willis M. Everett Jr. (USA) led the defence team, and Col. Burton Ellis (USA) led the prosecution team in the trial of the Waffen-SS war criminals indicted for the massacres of more than 300 US Army POWs "in the vicinity of Malmedy, Honsfeld, Büllingen, Ligneuville, Stoumont, La Gleize, Cheneux, Petit Thier, Trois Ponts, Stavelot, Wanne and Lutrebois" and the massacre of 100 Belgian civilians at Stavelot, during the 16 December 1944—13 January 1945 period at the time of the Battle of the Bulge.

In the course of the Malmedy Massacre Trial, six Waffen-SS defendants, including Peiper, complained to the tribunal that they had been victims of physical violence and threats of violence meant to compel them to confessions of their war crimes. The military tribunal asked the defendants to confirm their sworn statements; of the nine Waffen-SS officers who testified, three claimed to have been mistreated by U.S. Army jailers.

For the majority of the Nazis on trial, the defense argued they either had not participated in the massacres, or that superior orders had compelled them to participate in the massacres.

== Verdicts ==
On 16 July 1946 the verdict was delivered on 73 members of the Kampfgruppe Peiper. 43 were sentenced to death by hanging, including Peiper. Peiper's sentence was commuted to 35 years in 1954, and he was released in December 1956.

Approximately sixteen months after the end of the trial, almost all the defendants presented affidavits repudiating their former confessions and alleging aggravated duress of all types.

=== Review procedure ===
Pursuant to procedure, an in-house review was undertaken by the American Occupation Army in Germany; the trial was carefully examined by a deputy judge. Colonel Everett was convinced that a fair trial had not been granted to the defendants: in addition to alleged mock trials, he claimed that "to extort confessions, U.S. prosecution teams 'had kept the German defendants in dark, solitary confinement at near starvation rations up to six months; had applied various forms of torture, including the driving of burning matches under the prisoners' fingernails; had administered beatings which resulted in broken jaws and arms and permanently injured testicles'."

=== The Simpson Commission ===
The turmoil raised by this case caused the Secretary of the Army, Kenneth Royall, to create a commission, chaired by Justice Gordon Simpson of the Texas Supreme Court, to investigate. The commission supported Everett's accusations regarding mock trials and neither disputed nor denied his charges of torture of the defendants. The Commission expressed the opinion that the pre-trial investigation had not been properly conducted and that the members felt no death sentence should be executed in any instance where such doubts existed.

One member of the commission, Judge Edward L. Van Roden of Pennsylvania, allegedly made several public statements claiming that physical violence had been inflicted on the accused and questioned the validity of the hearings. James Finucane, an official of the National Council for the Prevention of War, said that he heard Van Roden "had made some shocking statements" at a meeting of the Federal Bar Association, and that when Finucane approached Van Roden to verify the report, Van Roden invited him to hear him speak on the same subject at the Rotary Club. The National Council for the Prevention of War made a press release on 18 December 1948, publicizing this speech, which the editor of The Progressive asked to run as a partly-ghostwritten article under Van Roden's byline. After Finucane spoke with Van Roden by telephone to get his permission and discuss revisions to the article, it ran in the February 1949 issue of the magazine.

The press release and article greatly inflamed the public scandal, especially with the statement that "all but two of the Germans in the 139 cases we investigated had been kicked in the testicles beyond repair. This was standard operating procedure with our American investigators." Finucane later testified that this was what he understood Van Roden to have said, albeit he had used "the Army language, which a person like he would use," and that he had read the statement back to Van Roden over the telephone and Van Roden had not corrected it. However, Van Roden denied under oath ever making statements found in the article, including the specific claim about 137 cases of damaged testicles.

Van Roden refused to commute the six remaining death sentences, including that of Peiper, but the executions were postponed. By 1951, most of the men were released and the only remaining death sentences, those of Peiper and five others, were commuted. Sepp Dietrich was paroled in 1955. Joachim Peiper was paroled in 1956. In 1956, Dietrich was re-arrested for his role in the Night of the Long Knives. In 1957, he was convicted of being an accessory to manslaughter and sentenced to 18 months in prison. After his appeals failed, Dietrich reported to prison in August 1958. He was released on health grounds in February 1959.

=== The Senate Subcommittee and Sen. Joseph McCarthy ===
Eventually, the United States Senate decided to investigate. Ultimately, the case was entrusted to the Committee on Armed Services over the Judiciary Committee and the Committee on Expenditures in the Executive Departments. The investigation was entrusted to a subcommittee of three senators chaired by Raymond E. Baldwin (R-CT). The subcommittee was set up on 29 March 1949. Its members went to Germany and during its hearings, the commission heard from no fewer than 108 witnesses.

Joseph McCarthy (R-WI) had obtained from the subcommittee's chairman authorization to attend the hearings. McCarthy's state, Wisconsin, had a large population of German heritage, spurring allegations that McCarthy was politically motivated in his work on behalf of the Malmedy defendants. He used an extremely aggressive questioning style during the proceedings.

McCarthy's actions further inflamed a split between the American Legion, which took a hardline position after Malmedy and generally supported upholding the death sentences, and the Veterans of Foreign Wars, who supported more lenient penalties for the Waffen-SS members under Peiper. The last clash took place in May 1949 when he asked that Lieutenant William R. Perl be given a polygraph test. As this had been rejected by Baldwin, McCarthy left the session claiming Baldwin was trying to whitewash the American military.

In May and June 1949, Van Roden indicated that he had been misquoted in the statements that 137 Germans had been "kicked in the testicles beyond repair" and that this was "standard operating procedure." He testified to the subcommittee that the statement that all but two of the men had been injured for life was "exaggerated" and "absolutely wrong," that the Commission "did not find that," that some of the men had been injured in their testicles but the commission could not find out how many, that he never said a specific number of men were kicked, that he did not know how many were kicked, that what he had said was that the commission had recommended commutation of the death sentences to life imprisonment in all but two cases (with commutation to finite prison sentences recommended in the last two), that he categorically denied that all but two were kicked in the testicles, that these two sentences should have been deleted from the article before publication, and that his failure to object to them earlier was an "oversight."

Chairman Senators Raymond Baldwin and Lester C. Hunt (D-WY) were later accused by historian David Oshinsky of being "determined to exonerate the Army at all costs". Oshinsky alleged the third member of the three man committee, Senator Estes Kefauver (D-TN), displayed a lack of interest in the case, attending only two of the first fifteen hearings. McCarthy sought to denounce Baldwin in front of the whole Senate, but his efforts were repudiated by the Commission on Armed Forces, which clearly showed its support for Baldwin and eventually adopted the subcommittee's official report.

It was later found that McCarthy had received "evidence" of the false torture claims from Rudolf Aschenauer, a prominent Neo-Nazi agitator who often served as a defense attorney for Nazi war criminals, such as Einsatzgruppen commander Otto Ohlendorf.

=== The subcommittee report ===
In its report, the subcommittee rejected the most serious charges, including beatings, torture, mock executions, and starvation of the defendants. In addition, the subcommittee determined that commutations of sentences pronounced by General Clay had occurred because of the U.S. Army's recognition that procedural irregularities could have occurred during the trial. The commission did not exonerate the defendants or absolve them of guilt and it endorsed the conclusions General Clay issued in the particular case of Lieutenant Christ. In summary, Clay had written that "he was personally convinced of the culpability of Lieutenant Christ and, that for this reason his death sentence was fully justified. But, to apply this sentence would be equivalent accepting a bad administration of justice, which led [him], not without reserve, to commute the death penalty to life imprisonment".

== See also ==
- Nuremberg trials

== Sources ==
- Smelser, Ronald; Davies, Edward J. (2008). The Myth of the Eastern Front: The Nazi-Soviet war in American popular culture. New York: Cambridge University Press. ISBN 9780521833653.
- Westemeier, Jens (2007). Joachim Peiper: A Biography of Himmler's SS Commander. Schiffer Publications. ISBN 978-0-7643-2659-2.
