= Hermann Priess =

SS general (1901–1985)

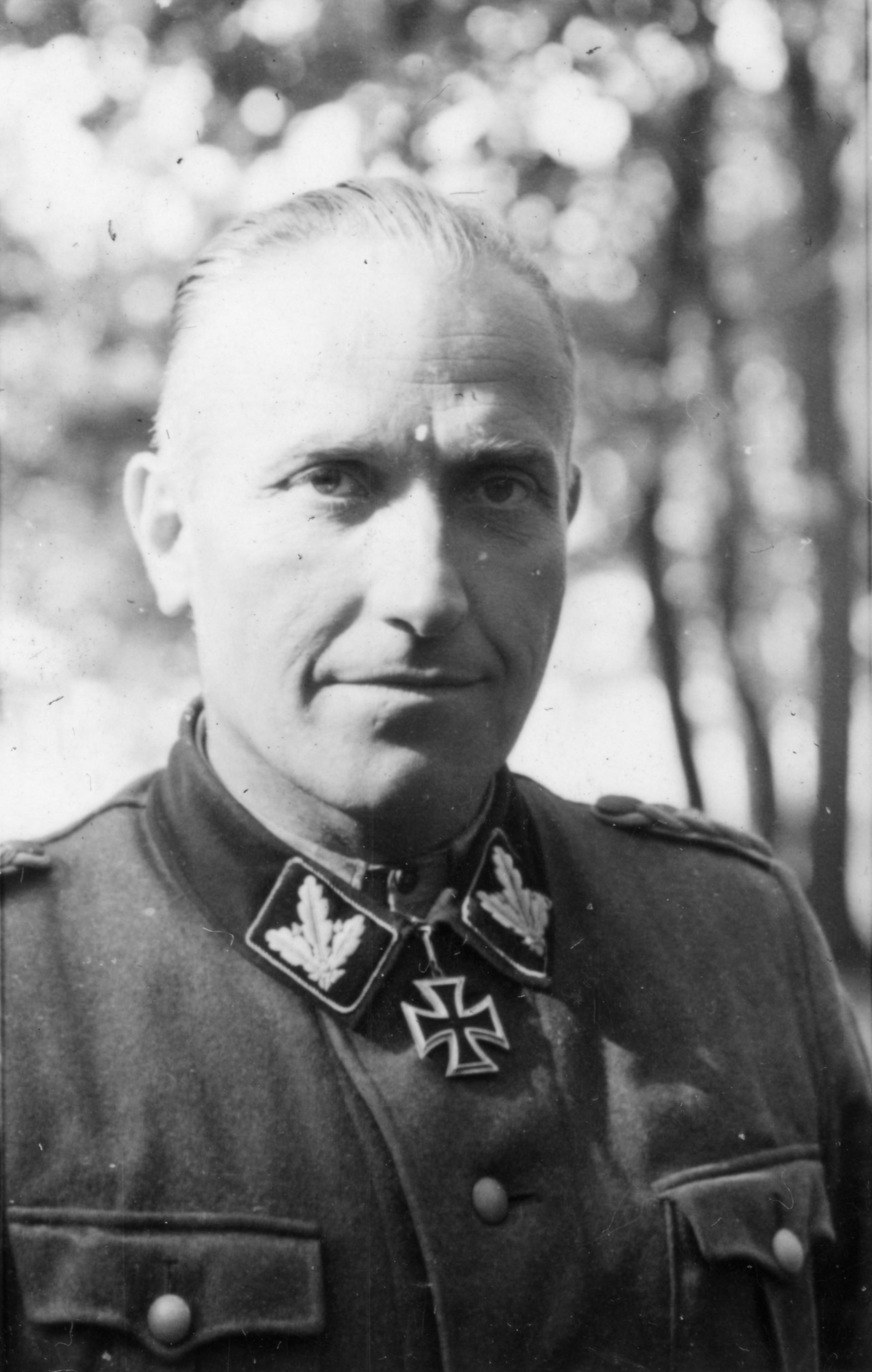
- Priess in 1943
- Born: 24 May 1901; Marnitz, German Empire
- Died: 2 February 1985 (aged 83); Ahrensburg, West Germany
- Military career
- Allegiance: German Empire; Weimar Republic; Nazi Germany
- Branch: Waffen-SS
- Service years: 1919–31, 1934–45
- Rank: SS-Gruppenführer and Generalleutnant of the Waffen-SS
- Service number: NSDAP #1,472,296; SS #113,258
- Commands: SS Division Totenkopf; I SS Panzer Corps
- Conflicts: Estonian War of Independence; World War II; Invasion of Poland; Battle of France; Demyansk Pocket; Battle of Kursk; Battle of the Bulge; Operation Southwind; Operation Spring Awakening
- Awards: Knight's Cross of the Iron Cross with Oak Leaves and Swords
- Criminal information
- Status: Deceased
- Conviction: War crimes
- Trial: Malmedy massacre trial
- Penalty: 20 years imprisonment

Hermann August Fredrich Priess (24 May 1901 – 2 February 1985) was a German general in the Waffen-SS and a war criminal during World War II. He commanded the SS Division Totenkopf ("Death's Head") following the death of Theodor Eicke in February 1943. On 30 October 1944 he was appointed commander of the I SS Panzer Corps and led it during the Battle of the Bulge.

After the war, Priess was convicted of war crimes for his involvement in the Malmedy massacre, and was sentenced to 20 years imprisonment. He was released from the Landsberg Prison in 1954.

== Career ==
Born in 1901, Priess volunteered for military service in the army of the German Empire in January 1919, which was transformed to the Reichsheer in the Weimar Republic. Due to the limitations imposed by the Treaty of Versailles, his regiment was disbanded. He then joined the paramilitary group Freikorps and fought in the Estonian War of Independence. In 1920, he returned to the army and was discharged in June 1931.

On 24 October 1944, Priess succeeded Georg Keppler as commander of I SS Panzer Corps. He led this formation, as part of the 6th Panzer Army, in the failed Ardennenoffensive, which was dubbed the Battle of the Bulge. The objective of the offensive was to split the British and American line in half, so the Germans could then proceed to encircle and destroy four Allied armies, forcing the Western Allies to negotiate a peace treaty with the Axis Powers. Subordinated to I SS Panzer Corps was Kampfgruppe "Peiper", led by Joachim Peiper. Peiper's command was responsible for the Malmedy massacre, a war crime in which 84 American prisoners of war were murdered by their German captors near Malmedy, Belgium.

After the Ardennes offensive, the 6th SS Panzer Army was transferred to Hungary, where it fought against the advancing Soviet Army. The I SS Panzer Corps arrived in Hungary in early February 1945. There, Priess committed his forces in Operation Southwind against the Hron Bridgehead, a strong position formed by the Soviets over the Danube near the town of Esztergom, destroying the bridgehead by the end of February. He then commanded I SS Panzer Corps in Operation Spring Awakening, the last major German offensive of World War II. The attack, centered in the Lake Balaton area, began on 6 March 1945 and ended with a German defeat on 16 March 1945.

== War crimes trial and conviction ==
In May 1945, Priess surrendered to the U.S. forces. He started working for the US Army Historical Division at the Camp King. From May–July 1946, he became one of 73 defendants at the Malmedy massacre trial held in the Dachau internment camp. Along with Sepp Dietrich, Joachim Peiper and others, Priess was charged with his complicity in murder of over 300 American POWs and 100 Belgian civilians between 16 December 1944 and 13 January 1945. Priess was found guilty of having ordered his men to fight with "reckless brutality and hardness", and relaying orders that the troops "were to be preceded by a wave of terror and fright, that no humane inhibitions were to be shown, and that every resistance was to be broken by terror."

On 16 July, Priess was sentenced to 20 years imprisonment. In October 1954, he was released prior to serving his full sentence from the Landsberg Prison. Priess died in 1985.

== Summary of SS career ==
Awards

- Iron Cross (1939) 2nd Class (22 September 1939) & 1st Class (15 October 1939)
- German Cross in Gold on 6 January 1942 as SS-Standartenführer in the SS-Artillerie-Regiment "Totenkopf"
- Knight's Cross of the Iron Cross with Oak Leaves and Swords
  - Knight's Cross on 28 April 1943 as SS-Oberführer and commander of Artillerie-Regiment of the SS-Panzergrenadier-Division Totenkopf
  - 297th Oak Leaves on 9 September 1943 as SS-Brigadeführer and Generalmajor of the Waffen-SS and commander of the SS-Panzergrenadier-Division "Totenkopf"
  - 65th Swords on 24 April 1944 as SS-Brigadeführer and Generalmajor of the Waffen-SS and commander of the 3. SS-Panzer-Division "Totenkopf"
- Wound Badge in Black

Promotions

| 26 February 1935: | SS-Untersturmführer |
| 15 September 1935: | SS-Obersturmführer |
| 13 September 1936: | SS-Hauptsturmführer |
| 20 April 1939: | SS-Sturmbannführer |
| 1 August 1940: | SS-Obersturmbannführer |
| 21 June 1941: | SS-Standartenführer |
| 13 July 1942: | SS-Oberführer |
| 15 July 1943: | SS-Brigadeführer and Generalmajor of the Waffen-SS |
| 20 April 1944: | SS-Gruppenführer and Generalleutnant of the Waffen-SS |

== See also ==
- List SS-Gruppenführer

Military offices
| Preceded by SS-Obergruppenführer Theodor Eicke | Commander of 3. SS-Division "Totenkopf"; 26 February 1943 – 21 June 1944 | Succeeded by SS-Brigadeführer Hellmuth Becker |
| Preceded by none | Commander of XIII SS-Armeekorps; 7 August 1944 – 24 October 1944 | Succeeded by SS-Gruppenführer Max Simon |
| Preceded by SS-Obergruppenführer Georg Keppler | Commander of I. SS-Panzer Corps; 30 October 1944 – 8 May 1945 | Succeeded by none |
