= I SS Panzer Corps =

German armoured corps during World War II

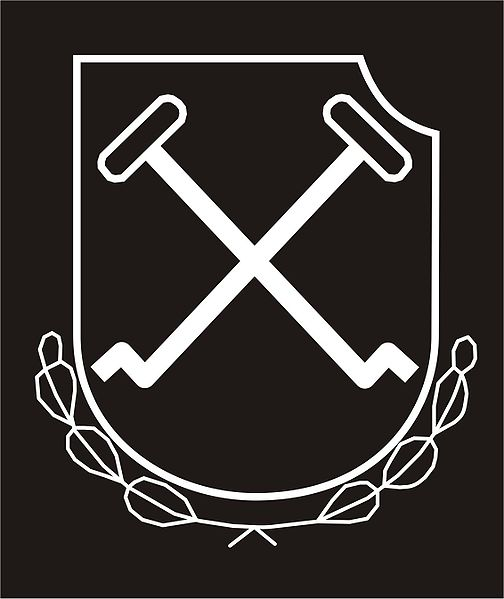
- Unit insignia
- Active: 27 July 1943 – 8 May 1945
- Country: Germany
- Branch: Waffen-SS
- Type: Panzer corps
- Role: Armoured warfare
- Size: ~70.000 troops (as of June 1944)
- Engagements: World War II: Operation Overlord; Battle for Caen; Operation Lüttich; Battle of the Falaise Gap; Battle of the Bulge; Operation Southwind; Operation Spring Awakening; Vienna Offensive

Commanders
- Notable commanders: Josef Dietrich; Fritz Kraemer; Georg Keppler; Hermann Priess

The I SS Panzer Corps (German: I.SS-Panzerkorps) was a German armoured corps of the Waffen-SS. It saw action on both the Western and Eastern Fronts during World War II.

== Formation and training ==
The Corps was raised on 26 July 1943 in Berlin-Lichterfeld, with initial mustering taking place on the Truppenübungsplatz at Beverloo, in occupied Belgium. SS-Obergruppenführer Sepp Dietrich, previously the commander of the 1st SS Panzer Division "Leibstandarte SS Adolf Hitler" (LSSAH), became the Corps' first commander.

In August 1943, the Corps was transferred to Merano in Italy, where it took part in operations to disarm Italian troops. After this, the Corps continued its training, being sporadically engaged in anti-partisan operations in northern Italy. By December 1943, the Corps was fully formed and deemed ready for action, with its HQ being set up in Brussels in early 1944.

== Operational history ==
=== Western Front: Normandy ===
In April 1944, the corps was moved to Septeuil, to the west of Paris, where it was assigned the LSSAH Division, the 12th SS Panzer Division "Hitlerjugend", the Panzer Lehr Division, and the 17th SS Panzergrenadier Division "Götz von Berlichingen". The corps was attached to the 5th Panzer Army, the Western theatre's armoured reserve.

With the launch of Operation Overlord, the Allied invasion of France on 6 June 1944, the corps was ordered to Falaise. The Hitlerjugend Division engaged British and Canadian troops to the north of Caen on 8 June. The corps was tasked with holding the area of Caen and saw heavy fighting around the villages of Authie, Buron, and the airport at Carpiquet.

After the launch of Operation Cobra, which destroyed the remnants of the Panzer Lehr Division, the corps was ordered to take part in Operation Lüttich, the abortive counter-offensive towards Avranches. The corps was caught in the Falaise pocket, where it fought to maintain a corridor for the trapped German forces, losing all its armour and equipment in the process. After the collapse of the front, the corps retreated to the Franco-German border.

=== Battle of the Bulge ===
In early October 1944, the corps was pulled back from the front line for rest and refit in Westfalen. Refitting was complete by early December, and it was ordered to the Ardennes region to join Dietrich's 6th Panzer Army, in preparation for an offensive codenamed Wacht Am Rhein, and the ensuing Battle of the Bulge. The corps played a major role in the battle with Kampfgruppe Peiper of the LSSAH Division forming a mobile spearhead. After several weeks of heavy fighting with severely limited fuel supplies, and heavy Allied air attacks, the corps was exhausted. The offensive had to be called off. Kampfgruppe Peiper became infamous during the battle for the murder of U.S. prisoners of war in what became known as the Malmedy massacre. In the wake of the defeat, the corps along with the remainder of Dietrich's army, was moved to Hungary.

=== Hungary and Austria ===
The corps, composed of the LSSAH and Hitlerjugend divisions, was instrumental in one of the last successful German offensives, Operation Southwind, eliminating the Soviet bridgehead west of the Garam in February 1945. The Germans then launched a pincer movement north and south of Lake Balaton as part of Operation Spring Awakening on 6 March 1945. This area included some of the last oil reserves still available to the Axis. The attack was spearheaded by the 6th Panzer Army and included the corps, made up of elite units such as the LSSAH and Hitlerjugend divisions. Dietrich's army made "good progress" at first, but as they drew near the Danube, the combination of the muddy terrain and strong Soviet resistance ground them to a halt. On 16 March, the Soviet forces counterattacked in strength, which forced the entire southern front to retreat towards Vienna. The German forces, including the LSSAH and Hitlerjugend divisions, could not hold Vienna, which fell to Soviet forces on 13 April. The Germans units then retreated into Hungary. Thereafter, the bulk of the LSSAH Division surrendered to U.S. forces near Steyr and the Hitlerjugend Division surrendered to U.S. troops near the town of Enns, Austria on 8 May 1945.

== Commanders ==
- SS-Oberst-Gruppenführer Sepp Dietrich (4 July 1943 – 9 August 1944)
- SS-Brigadeführer Fritz Kraemer (9 – 16 August 1944)
- SS-Obergruppenführer Georg Keppler (16 August 1944 – 30 October 1944)
- SS-Gruppenführer Hermann Priess (30 October 1944 – 8 May 1945)

== Orders of battle ==
6 June 1944 (Invasion of Normandy)

- 101st SS Heavy Panzer Battalion
- 1st SS Panzer Division "Leibstandarte SS Adolf Hitler"
- 12th SS Panzer Division "Hitlerjugend"
- 17th SS Panzergrenadier Division "Götz von Berlichingen"
- Panzer Lehr Division

7 August 1944 (Operation Lüttich)

- 1st SS Panzer Division "Leibstandarte SS Adolf Hitler" (elements)
- 2nd SS Panzer Division "Das Reich"

16 December 1944 (Operation Wacht Am Rhein)

- 501st Heavy SS Panzer Battalion
- 1st SS Panzer Division "Leibstandarte SS Adolf Hitler"
- 12th SS Panzer Division "Hitlerjugend"
- 3rd Parachute Division
- 12th Volksgrenadier Division
- 277th Infantry Division

8 January 1945 (Battle of the Bulge)

- Kampfgruppe Peiper (remnants)
- 501st Heavy SS Panzer Battalion
- 1st SS Panzer Division "Leibstandarte SS Adolf Hitler" (remnants)
- 12th SS Panzer Division "Hitlerjugend" (remnants)
- 3rd Parachute Division

3 March 1945 (build-up for Operation Spring Awakening)

- 1st SS Panzer Division "Leibstandarte SS Adolf Hitler"
  - 1st SS Panzer Regiment
    - 501st Heavy SS Panzer Battalion (2nd battalion of the 1st SS Panzer Regiment)
  - 1st SS Panzerjäger Battalion
  - 1st SS Panzergrenadier Battalion
  - 2nd SS Panzergrenadier Battalion
- 12th SS Panzer Division "Hitlerjugend"
  - 12th SS Panzer Regiment
  - 25th SS Panzergrenadier Regiment
  - 26th SS Panzergrenadier Regiment
  - 12th SS Panzerjäger Battalion
    - 560th Heavy Panzerjäger Battalion
