= Fritz Kraemer (Waffen-SS) =

SS commander and war criminal (1900–1959)

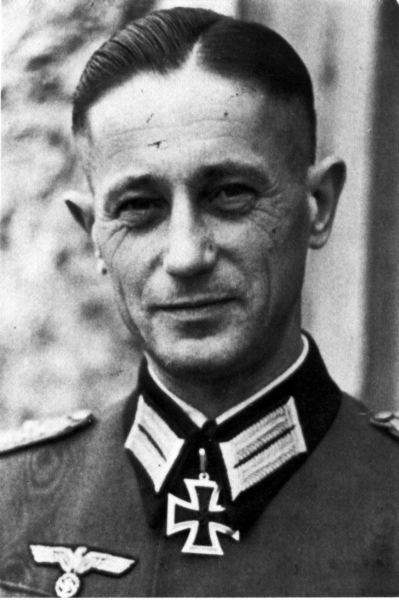
- Kraemer in 1944
- Born: 12 December 1900; Stettin, Kingdom of Prussia, German Empire
- Died: 23 June 1959 (aged 58); Hamburg, West Germany
- Military career
- Allegiance: German Empire; Weimar Republic; Nazi Germany
- Branch: German Army; Waffen SS
- Service years: 1918–1945
- Rank: SS-Brigadeführer
- Commands: I SS Panzer Corps; SS Division Hitlerjugend
- Conflicts: World War II
- Awards: Knight's Cross of the Iron Cross

Fritz Kraemer (12 December 1900 – 23 June 1959) was a high-ranking Waffen-SS commander and war criminal during the Nazi era. During World War II, Kraemer initially served with the 13th Infantry Division. In January 1943, he was appointed as a staff officer of the I SS Panzer Corps commanded by Sepp Dietrich. Kraemer was admitted into the SS on 1 August 1944. During the battles in Normandy, Krämer acted as Dietrich’s deputy, and eventually succeeded Hubert Meyer as commander of the SS Division Hitlerjugend. He was in charge of the division until 13 November 1944.

Kraemer later served as a chief of staff with the 6th Panzer Army and surrendered to the U.S. Army, along with Dietrich, in May 1945. He was tried in 1946 for his role in the Malmedy massacre. He was found guilty of war crimes for his role in the drafting and transmission of illegal orders. The orders, which were authorized by Dietrich, directed that prisoners of war could be shot "if necessary, in very compelling situations". Kraemer was sentenced to 10 years in prison. He was released in 1952, and died in 1959.

== Awards ==
- German Cross in Gold (1942)
- Iron Cross Second Class (1939) and First Class (1940)
- Knight's Cross of the Iron Cross on 17 December 1942 as Oberstleutnant im Generalstab (i.G.; in the General Staff) and Ia (operations officer) in the 13. Panzer-Division

Military offices
Preceded by SS-Oberstgruppenführer Sepp Dietrich	Commander of I SS Panzer Corps; 9 August 1944 – 16 August 1944	Succeeded by SS-Obergruppenführer Georg Keppler
Preceded by SS-Obersturmbannführer Hubert Meyer	Commander of SS Division Hitlerjugend; 24 October 1944 – 13 November 1944	Succeeded by SS-Brigadeführer Hugo Kraas
