= Kampfgruppe Peiper =

Nazi German combat force

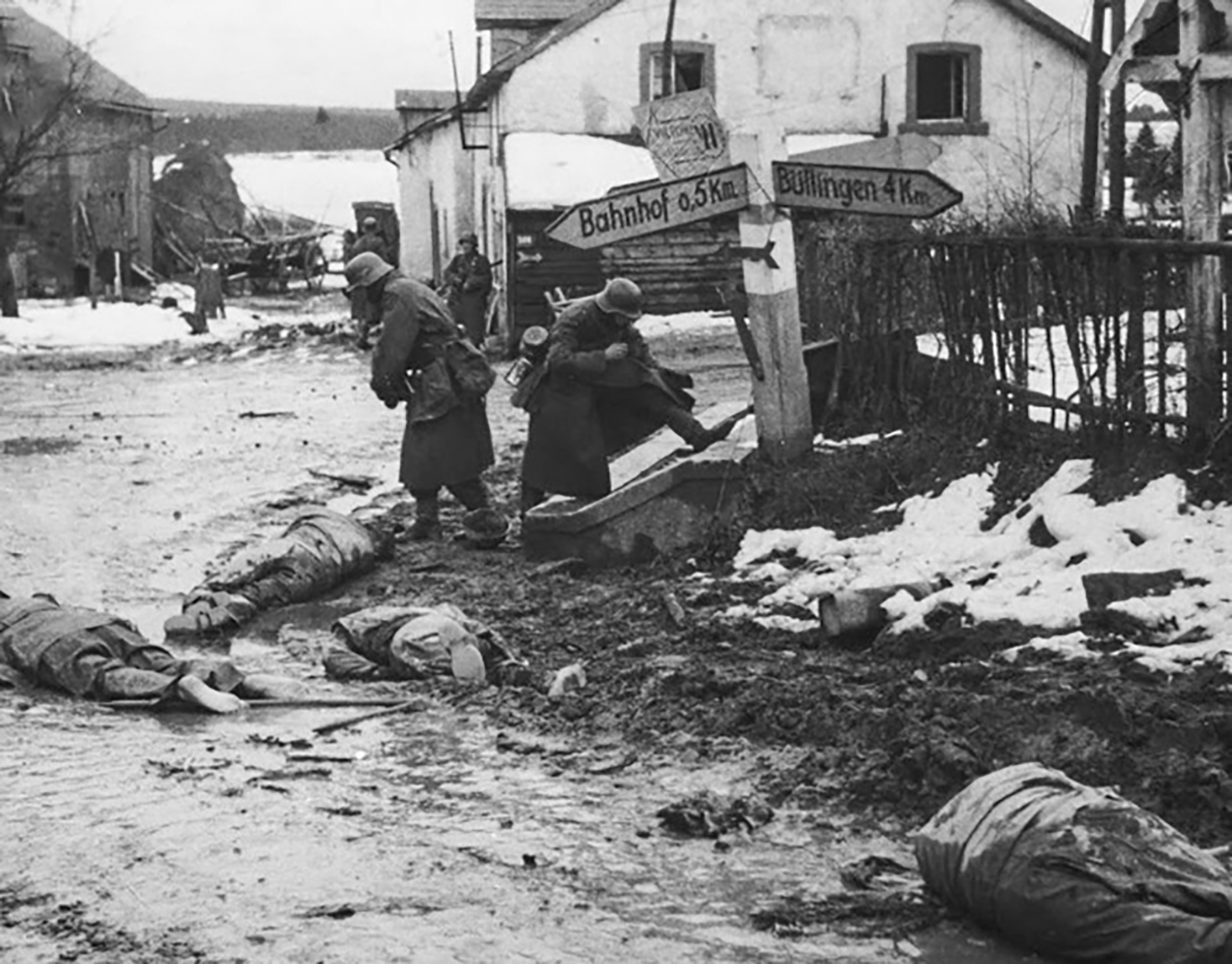
Soldiers from Kampfgruppe Peiper examining American soldiers killed after the Battle of Losheim Gap, 1944

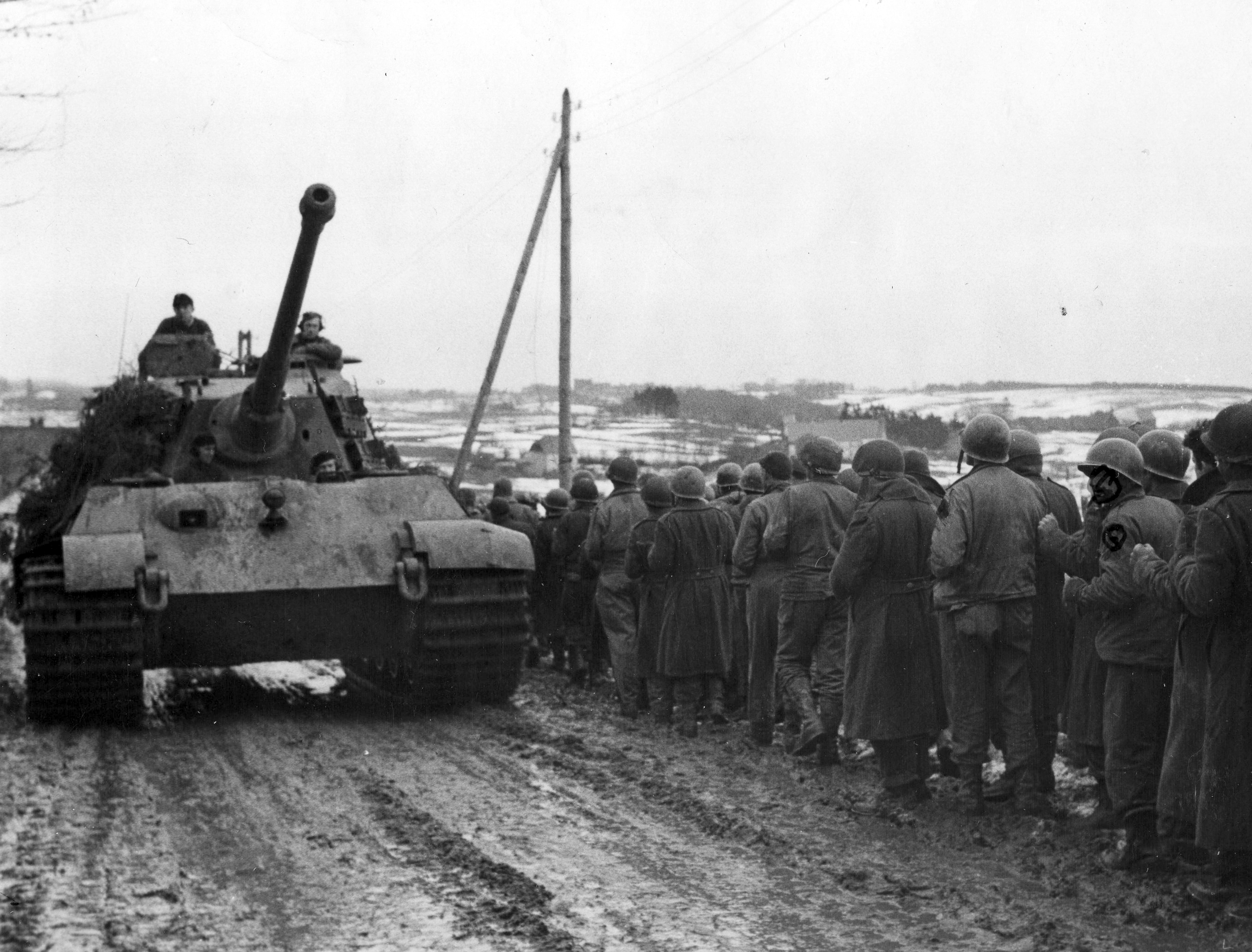
A Tiger II from Kampfgruppe Peiper, and the American POWs alongside it, 1944

Kampfgruppe Peiper (lit. 'Peiper's Battle Group') was a combat force consisting of units from the Wehrmacht and the Waffen-SS, led by Lieutenant Colonel Joachim Peiper. The unit comprised 5,000+ troops and 800+ heavy military vehicles. Prior to 16 December 1944, Joachim Peiper was commander of the 1st SS Panzer Regiment of the 1st SS Panzer Division Leibstandarte SS Adolf Hitler. Troops were added to that unit to form the Kampfgruppe. The unit was under the command of Waffen-SS General Sepp Dietrich and his newly formed 6th Panzer Army.

It was the strongest German unit during the Battle of the Bulge, equipped with Panzerkampfwagen Mk. V, 40 Panther V tanks, and 45 Königstigers, 149 half-track vehicles, eighteen 105 mm guns, six 150 mm guns, and more than thirty anti-aircraft artillery pieces. Sources contradict each other regarding the number of troops and vehicles. It happened that parts of the Kampfgruppe moved out to different locations.

== Composition of the Kampfgruppe ==
The 1st SS Panzer Division Leibstandarte SS Adolf Hitler was divided into Kampfgruppen, with Kampfgruppe Peiper being by far the strongest. The other three were: Kampfgruppe Hansen, led by SS-Obersturmbannführer Max Hansen and his 1st SS Panzer Grenadier Regiment; Kampfgruppe Sandig, led by SS-Sturmbannführer Rudolf Sandig and his 2nd SS Panzer Grenadier Regiment; and Kampfgruppe Knittel, led by SS-Sturmbannführer Gustav Knittel and his 1st Reconnaissance Battalion. The following is the composition of Kampfgruppe Peiper:

- 1st SS Panzer Battalion of the 1st Regiment, with two companies of Panthers and two companies of Panzer IV under Werner Poetschke
- 3rd SS Panzer Grenadier Battalion of the 2nd Regiment, with five companies in half-track vehicles under Josef Diefenthal
- 501st SS Heavy Tank Battalion with 45 Königstigers, of which only a much smaller portion was available for combat, under Heinz von Westernhagen
- 1st SS Armored Artillery Battalion of the 1st Regiment with six towed 105 mm guns under Ludwig Kalischko

The 3rd SS Armored Engineer Company of the 1st SS Battalion, with two platoons in half-track vehicles and two in trucks, and the 84th Luftwaffe Anti-Aircraft Battalion, presumably equipped with 20 mm and 37 mm anti-aircraft guns under Major von Sacken, were under the direct command of Joachim Peiper. This force was supplemented by an SS armored supply company with modest resources and an SS armored maintenance company with modest resources.
