= 285th Field Artillery Observation Battalion =

United States Army unit on the Western Front of WWII

- Active: 1942–1945
- Country: United States
- Branch: United States Army
- Role: Artillery sound ranging
- Engagements: World War II: Ardennes-Alsace

The 285th Field Artillery Observation Battalion was a United States Army unit that saw action in the Battle of the Bulge in World War II. Their main mission was to identify the location of enemy artillery using the "sound and flash" technique (sound ranging and flash spotting).

== Malmedy massacre ==
On 17 December 1944, members of Battery B, 285th Field Artillery Observation Battalion were traveling from Aachen, Germany to the Ardennes in Belgium when 84 of them were captured by Joachim Peiper's 1st SS Panzer Division at Baugnez, lined up in a nearby field and mowed down with machine gun fire in what became known as the Malmedy massacre.
