= Josef Diefenthal =

SS officer (1915–2001)

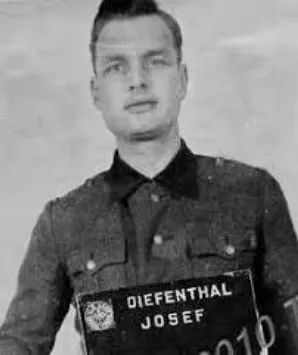
- Josef Diefenthal mugshot
- Born: 5 October 1915; Euskirchen, German Empire
- Died: 13 April 2001 (aged 85); Euskirchen, Germany
- Military career
- Allegiance: Nazi Germany
- Branch: Waffen-SS
- Service years: 1939–45
- Rank: Sturmbannfuhrer
- Unit: SS Division Leibstandarte
- Conflicts: World War II
- Awards: Knight's Cross of the Iron Cross

Josef Diefenthal (5 October 1915 – 13 April 2001) was a mid-ranking commander in the Waffen-SS of Nazi Germany and a war criminal during World War II. He was a recipient of the Knight's Cross of the Iron Cross on 5 February 1945 for his actions during the Ardennes Offensive, while in command of the 3rd Battalion, 2nd SS Panzer Grenadier Regiment, SS Division Leibstandarte.

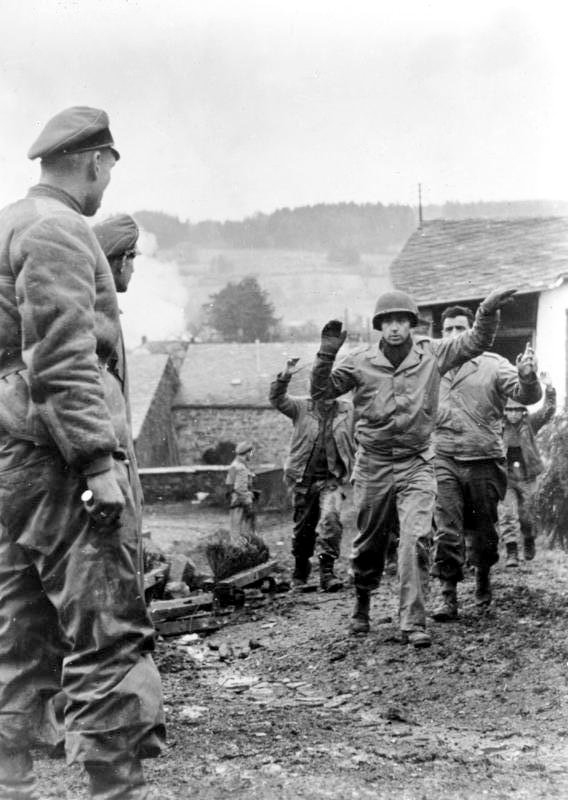
Diefenthal watches American soldiers of the U.S. 119th Infantry Regiment, 30th ID, as they surrender in Stoumont, Belgium on 19 December 1944.

Diefenthal was found guilty of war crimes at the Malmedy massacre trial committed during the Battle of the Bulge. He was found guilty of issuing illegal orders, and personally approving the murder of at least one American prisoner of war.

"He reported to the speech to his company that he had heard at Diefenthal's battalion command post, which included statements that enemy resistance was to be broken by terror and that no prisoners of war were to be taken."

Diefenthal was sentenced to death, which was later changed to life imprisonment in 1951. He was released in 1956.
