= Georg Keppler =

German Waffen-SS general (1894–1966

- Born: 7 May 1894; Mainz, German Empire
- Died: 16 June 1966 (aged 72); Hamburg, West Germany
- Military career
- Allegiance: German Empire; Nazi Germany
- Service years: 1913–1919; 1935–1945
- Rank: Oberleutnant; SS-Obergruppenführer
- Commands: SS Division Das Reich; SS Division Totenkopf; I SS Panzer Corps; III SS Panzer Corps; XVIII SS Army Corps
- Conflicts: World War I World War II
- Awards: Knight's Cross of the Iron Cross

Georg Keppler (7 May 1894 – 16 June 1966) was a high-ranking Waffen-SS commander during World War II. He commanded the SS Division Das Reich, SS Division Totenkopf, I SS Panzer Corps, III SS Panzer Corps and the XVIII SS Army Corps.

== Career ==
Georg Keppler joined the Royal Prussian Army in 1913 and took part in World War I. At the end of the war, he was the adjutant of Fusilier Regiment 73 and left the service in 1919 with the rank of Oberleutnant. From 1919, Keppler was a police officer and commanded city and state police units in Jena and Gotha between 1930 and 1935. On 1 October 1930, he joined the Nazi Party (membership number 338,211). On 10 October 1935, he joined the party's paramilitary force, the SS-Verfügungstruppe (SS number 273,799), eventually leading a battalion in the Deutschland regiment. In September 1938, after the Anschluss, Keppler was promoted to command the newly raised Der Führer regiment, becoming a component of the SS-Verfügungs Division. Keppler served as Der Führer‘s regimental commander throughout the invasion of France, Balkans Campaign and in Operation Barbarossa. In August 1940, Keppler was awarded the Knight's Cross of the Iron Cross. On 15 July 1941, he took over for injured Theodor Eicke as a commander of the SS Division Totenkopf. He went on to command the SS Division Nord and the SS Division Das Reich.

From February 1943, Keppler held a number of administrative positions within the Waffen-SS. In August 1944, he was given a field assignment as commander of the I SS Panzer Corps, which he led until October 1944, during the later stages of the Battle of Normandy. He then returned to the Eastern Front, where he took over the III Panzer Corps. He remained with this unit until 2 April 1945 when he became the last commander of the XVIII SS Army Corps, surrendering the unit to the U.S. Army on 2 May 1945. After the war Keppler was interned; he was released in 1948. Keppler died in 1966.

== Awards and decorations ==
- Iron Cross (1914)
  - 2nd class
  - 1st class
- Hanseatic Cross of Hamburg
- Brunswick War Merit Cross, 2nd class with combatants ribbon
- Wound Badge in silver
- Silesian Eagle, 1st and 2nd class
- Honour Cross of the World War 1914/1918
- Clasp to the Iron Cross (1939)
  - 2nd class
  - 1st class
- Knight's Cross of the Iron Cross on 15 August 1940 as SS-Oberführer and commander of SS-Standarte "Der Führer"

Military offices
Preceded by SS-Obergruppenführer Matthias Kleinheisterkamp	Commander of 3. SS-Panzer Division Totenkopf; 15 July 1941 – 21 September 1941	Succeeded by SS-Obergruppenführer Theodor Eicke
Preceded by SS-Obergruppenführer Karl-Maria Demelhuber	Commander of 6. SS-Gebirgs-Division Nord; September 1941 – October 1941	Succeeded by SS-Obergruppenführer Karl-Maria Demelhuber
Preceded by SS-Obergruppenführer Matthias Kleinheisterkamp	Commander of 2. SS-Division Das Reich; 1 April 1942 – 10 October 1943	Succeeded by SS-Brigadeführer Herbert-Ernst Vahl
Preceded by SS-Brigadeführer Fritz Kraemer	Commander of I. SS-Panzer Corps; 16 August 1944 – 24 October 1944	Succeeded by SS-Obergruppenführer Hermann Priess
Preceded by SS-Obergruppenführer Felix Steiner	Commander of III.(germanische) SS-Panzerkorps; 30 October 1944 – 4 February 1945	Succeeded by SS-Obergruppenführer Matthias Kleinheisterkamp
Preceded by SS-Gruppenführer Heinz Reinfarth	Commander of XVIII. SS-Armeekorps; 4 February 1945 – 8 May 1945	Succeeded by dissolved on 8 May 1945
