= Hellmuth Becker (SS officer) =

German general (1902–1953)

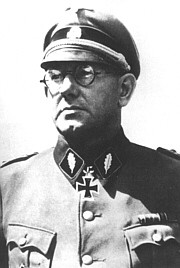
- H. Becker, here SS-Standartenführer
- Born: 12 August 1902; Altruppin, German Empire
- Died: 28 February 1953 (aged 50); Prison camp No. 337, Sverdlovsk, Ukrainian SSR, Soviet Union
- Cause of death: Execution by shooting
- Military career
- Allegiance: Weimar Republic; Nazi Germany
- Branch: Schutzstaffel
- Service years: 1920–1945
- Rank: SS-Brigadeführer
- Unit: SS Division Totenkopf
- Conflicts: World War II
- Awards: Knight's Cross of the Iron Cross with Oak Leaves

Hellmuth Becker (12 August 1902, Alt Ruppin, Neuruppin – 28 February 1953) was a German SS commander during the Nazi era. In World War II, he led the SS Division Totenkopf from 1944 and was a recipient of the Knight's Cross of the Iron Cross with Oak Leaves. Post-war, Becker was tried by Soviet authorities twice, first for war crimes and then for sabotage and was executed in 1953, after the second trial.

== Career ==
Born in 1902, Becker joined the army in 1920 and left it in 1932 with the rank of Sergeant major (Wachtmeister). In 1933, he joined the SS and met Wilhelm Bittrich and Hermann Priess. In 1935, Becker was transferred to the SS Totenkopf Standarte "Oberbayern", stationed at the SS-Übungslager Dachau, which later became part of the SS Division Totenkopf. On 9 November 1940, Becker was promoted to SS-Obersturmbannführer and commander of the SS-Totenkopf-Regiment. From 1942 to 1944 he held the rank of an SS-Standartenführer and saw active duty in the Totenkopf-Division. Early in 1944, he was transferred to SS-Führungshauptamt and in March, he assumed command of the 36th SS Panzer Grenadier Regiment, SS Division Reichsführer-SS in Italy. On 21 June, he was promoted to SS-Oberführer and in July, commander of the 3rd SS-Panzerdivision Totenkopf. The 1 October 1944 he was promoted to SS-Brigadeführer.

In December 1944, the division was moved to Hungary for the battles around Budapest. The division crossed the Danube River to Vienna, attempting to surrender to the U.S. forces. Under the terms of Germany's capitulation, the surrender was refused and the unit was handed over to the Soviet Red Army.

Becker proved himself a brutal, ruthless and debauched man, even by SS standards according to official Waffen-SS inquiries: "On the Eastern Front, Becker has raped Russian women in public and has appeared completely drunk on several occasions in the frontlines as regimental commander. In Spring 1943, he had organised prostitutes to come to his command centre and on the 20 April 1943, he had all the artillery sent a ten-minute salute salvo to celebrate the Führer’s birthday. Even on the Western front on Christmas 1942, he had organised an orgy for his regiment in the officers' casino. He had destroyed furniture, broken windows and had a horse ridden to death by his fellow officers."

== Trials, convictions and execution ==
In November 1947, he was put on trial before a Soviet military court in Poltava and sentenced to 25 years in prison with hard labour for war crimes. While serving his sentence, Becker "tried his jailers' patience" by attempting to manufacture explosives, leading to his retrial. "The personification of the brutal Landsknechts who formed the high-ranking officers of the Waffen-SS", he was convicted and executed in February 1953.

== Awards ==
- Iron Cross (1939) 2nd Class (24 May 1940) & 1st Class (26 June 1940)
- German Cross in Gold on 26 September 1942 as SS-Standartenführer in SS-Totenkopf Regiment 3
- Knight's Cross of the Iron Cross with Oak Leaves
  - Knight's Cross on 7 September 1943 as SS-Standartenführer and commander of the SS Regiment Theodor Eicke.
  - Oak Leaves on 21 September 1944 as SS-Oberführer and commander of the SS Division Totenkopf

== See also ==
- Main article List SS-Brigadeführer
