= XVIII SS Corps =

XVIII SS Army Corps
- Active: December 1944 – May 1945
- Country: Germany
- Branch: Waffen-SS
- Size: Corps

The XVIII SS Army Corps was formed in December 1944 on the Upper Rhine from the remnants of three Wehrmacht infantry divisions.

In January 1945, the corps joined the 19th Army until the end of the war. It fought on the upper reaches of the Rhine between Donaueschingen and Schaffhausen. On May 6, 1945, between the Black Forest and Lake Constance, it surrendered to the French First Army.

== Commanders ==
- SS-Gruppenführer Heinz Reinefarth (December 1944 – 12 February 1945)
- SS-Obergruppenführer Georg Keppler (12 February 1945 – 6 May 1945)
