= Werner Poetschke =

Waffen-SS officer, SS Pz Rgt 1 LSSAH

Werner Herman Gustav Pötschke
- Born: 6 March 1914; Brussels, Belgium
- Died: 24 March 1945 (aged 31); Veszprém, Hungary
- Military career
- Allegiance: Nazi Germany
- Branch: Waffen-SS
- Service years: 1935–45
- Rank: SS-Sturmbannführer
- Service number: SS #288,965
- Unit: LSSAH; Das Reich
- Commands: SS Panzer Regiment 1 LSSAH
- Known for: Malmedy massacre
- Conflicts: World War II; Ardennes Offensive
- Awards: Knight's Cross of the Iron Cross with Oak Leaves; German Cross in Gold

Werner Poetschke (6 March 1914 – 24 March 1945) was a German SS-Sturmbannführer and battalion commander. He commanded SS Panzer Regiment 1 LSSAH during the Ardennes Offensive and is considered to be the primary person responsible for the Malmedy massacre.

== Biography ==
Werner Poetschke was born in Brussels in 1914. In 1935 he entered the SS and served in the Leibstandarte. From March 1938 he was a platoon commander in the SS standard "Der Führer", with whom he participated in the Polish campaign and won the Iron Cross 1st class. In the French Campaign, he commanded a platoon in the 1st Company of the Reconnaissance Battalion with which he captured a bridge over the Maas–Waal Canal. In France he destroyed a motor cycle unit and six anti-tanks guns near Dissen. His evaluation by his superiors however was negative, they considered him to be overreckless and a bad people manager, and Poetschke was transferred to the division Das Reich. Werner Poetschke then took part in the Balkan campaign and in the battles on the Eastern Front for which he received the German Cross in Gold. From April 1942 he was commander of the 2nd company of the reconnaissance battalion of the SS division Das Reich. In early 1943 he was transferred to the 1st Battalion of the 1st Panzer Regiment of the SS Division "Leibstandarte SS Adolf Hitler" as commander of the 1st company. In August 1943, he was sent to Italy, and in December 1943 to Russia. Poetschke received the Knight's Cross in 1944.

Poetschke was characteristically described as unstable, impulsive, fickle and a hothead who had only contempt for the enemy and who was extremely hard on his own men. During the Battle of the Bulge, Poetschke was commander of the 1st SS Panzer Battalion that was part of “Kampfgruppe Peiper”. Poetschke was identified by various persons involved and eyewitnesses as the officer directly responsible for giving the order to execute the American prisoners near the Baugnez crossroads, which culminated in the Malmedy massacre.

In March 1945 he received the Oak Leaves to his Knight's Cross. During the fighting in Hungary, Poetschke was seriously wounded in battle and he died two days later from his wounds.

== Awards ==
- Iron Cross 2nd Class on 27 September 1939, 1st Class on 2 June 1940
- German Cross in Gold on 5 November 1942
- Knight's Cross of the Iron Cross with Oak Leaves
  - Knight's Cross on 4 June 1944 as SS-Hauptsturmführer and company commander in SS-Pz.Rgt 1 LSSAH
  - 783rd Oak Leaves on 15 March 1945 as SS-Sturmbannführer and commander of the I.(schw)/SS-Pz.Rgt. 1 LSSAH
- Close Combat Clasp in Bronze
- Wound Badge in Gold
- Tank Destruction Badge
