= William R. Perl =

American lawyer

- Born: September 21, 1906; Prague, Austro-Hungarian Empire
- Died: December 24, 1998 (aged 92); Beltsville, Maryland, United States
- Education: University of Vienna; Columbia University
- Occupations: Lawyer; Psychologist
- Known for: Chief interrogator during the Malmedy massacre trial

William R. Perl (September 21, 1906 – December 24, 1998) was a Prague-born American lawyer and psychologist who was the chief interrogator during the Malmedy massacre trial.

== Early life and education ==
William R. Perl was born to a textile merchant in Prague on September 21, 1906, in what was then the Austro-Hungarian Empire. He spent much of his youth and early adulthood in Vienna. Perl attended the University of Vienna, where he earned a Ph.D. in law and a master's degree in international business. He joined Ivria, one of several Jewish fraternities, as a student and soon became deeply immersed in the growing Zionist movement. Perl established a successful law firm in Vienna after graduating and practiced law there until the Nazi take-over in 1938.

== Zionist activity and organized immigration of European Jews ==
Perl was a protégé of the Revisionist Zionist movement of Vladimir Jabotinsky. He participated in the movement during the 1930s as it became increasingly active against the NSDAP. In 1938 he organized "Die Aktion," a circle of young Viennese Zionists dedicated to making Theodor Herzl's dream of an independent Jewish state a reality. Less than a year later, Die Aktion succeeded in landing a number of Jewish immigrants on the coast of then Mandatory Palestine (now Israel). This is believed to have been the first successful landing of such refugees, when almost every other escape route had been closed to them.

Perl continued to work with Zionist groups and Greek smugglers, organizing large-scale illegal immigration of Jews to Palestine (Aliyah Bet) and prodding reluctant Jewish leaders into doing the same. Perl rescued an estimated forty thousand Jews from Nazi occupied Europe, often acting just one step ahead of the Gestapo and of the British agents working to stop illegal immigration.

== Marriage and immigration to the United States ==
Perl married Lore Rollig in 1938, a Viennese woman who converted to Judaism that year. Their marriage was a closely guarded secret because the Nazis' Nuremberg Laws treated such intermarriage as a serious crime. Perl immigrated to the United States in 1940 and was working to arrange for Lore to join him when Nazi Germany declared war on the United States. Lore Perl was arrested in 1943 for aiding Jewish children and was sent to Ravensbrück concentration camp. She escaped the camp and survived.

== Enlistment in the U.S. Army ==
Perl joined the U.S. Army in 1941 and became a military intelligence officer. He was assigned to Allied Intelligence in London, where he worked with some of the same British intelligence officers who had pursued him across Europe.

Perl risked court-martial and imprisonment to rescue Lore from Vienna in 1945, then under Soviet occupation.

== Post-War and Malmedy Massacre trial ==
Perl was a chief interrogator during the Malmedy massacre trial, where Col. Joachim Peiper and other members of the Waffen-SS were prosecuted for the murder of American prisoners of war at Malmedy, Belgium in December 1944. Together with Raphael Shumacker, Robert E. Byrne, Morris Ellowitz, Harry Thon and Joseph Kirschbaum, Perl was criticized for alleged torture at the interrogations.

The Perls settled in the United States with their two sons, Raphael and Solomon. Perl continued his study of psychology at Columbia University and then served as an army psychologist until his retirement with the rank of Lt. Colonel in 1966.

== Jewish Defense League activity ==
Perl became the leader of the Washington, D.C. branch of the Jewish Defense League in the 1970s, and received international media attention for his protests against persecution of Jews by the Soviet Union. He organized demonstrations outside and inside the Soviet Embassy and at public events involving Soviet officials. He was arrested and convicted by a federal jury in Baltimore in November 1976 for conspiring to shoot out the windows of the apartments of two Soviet Embassy officials in Hyattsville, Maryland. He received a 2-year suspended sentence, placed on probation for three years, and fined $12,000.

== Death ==
Perl remained active in Jewish affairs until his death, despite suffering from Parkinson's disease. He died at his home on December 24, 1998.

== Works ==
- Operation Action: Rescue from the Holocaust (1983)
- The Four Front War: From the Holocaust to the Promised Land (1988)
- The Holocaust Conspiracy: An International Policy of Genocide (1989)
