= Malmedy massacre =

1944 German war crime

- Part of the Battle of the Bulge during World War II
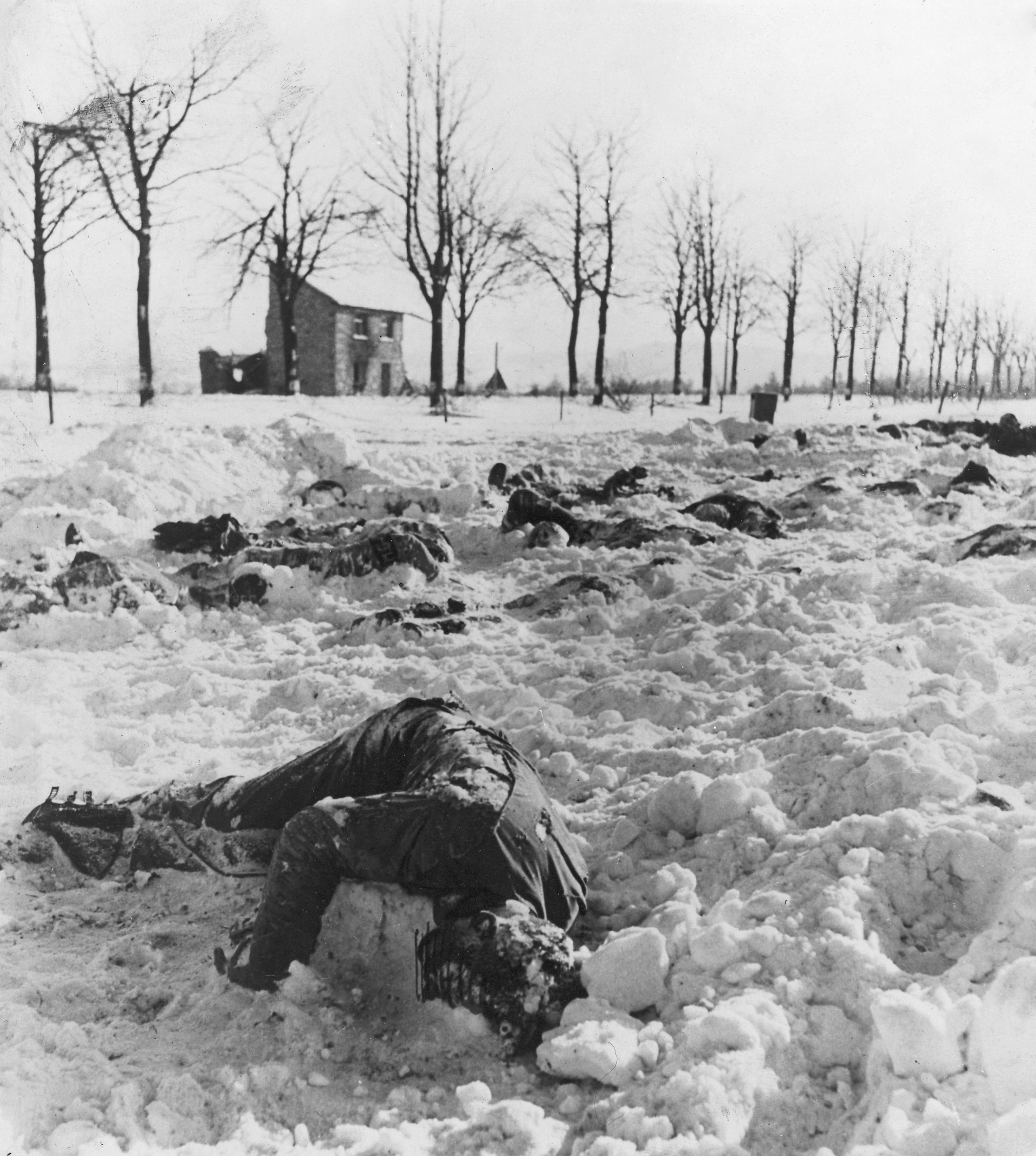
- Corpses of the U.S. soldiers murdered by Kampfgruppe Peiper, 17 December 1944

- Malmedy massacre (Belgium)
- Location: 50°24′14″N 6°3′58.30″E; Malmedy, Belgium
- Date: 17 December 1944
- Attack type: Mass shooting by machine gun and gunshots to the head, summary execution
- Deaths: 84 U.S. POWs of the 285th Field Artillery Observation Battalion
- Perpetrators: 1st SS Panzer Division Leibstandarte SS Adolf Hitler: Joachim Peiper; Werner Poetschke; Sepp Dietrich

The Malmedy massacre was a German war crime committed by soldiers of the Waffen-SS on 17 December 1944 at the Baugnez crossroads near the city of Malmedy, Belgium, during the Battle of the Bulge (16 December 1944 – 25 January 1945). German soldiers under the command of Joachim Peiper (Kampfgruppe Peiper) summarily executed 84 U.S. Army prisoners of war (POWs) who had surrendered to them following a brief skirmish. The Waffen-SS soldiers had grouped the U.S. POWs in a farmer's field, where they used machine guns to shoot and kill the grouped POWs; many of the prisoners of war who survived the gunfire of the massacre were executed with a gunshot to the head.

Besides the summary execution of the eighty-four U.S. POWs at the farmer's field, the term "Malmedy massacre" also includes other Waffen-SS massacres of civilians and POWs in Belgian villages and towns in the time after their first massacre of U.S. POWs at Malmedy; these Waffen-SS war crimes were the subjects of the Malmedy massacre trial (May–July 1946), which was a part of the Dachau trials (1945–1947).

== Background ==
=== Political ===
Late in the Second World War, the Third Reich's war-crime violations of the Geneva Conventions were a type of psychological warfare meant to induce fear of the Wehrmacht and of the Waffen-SS in the soldiers of the Allied armies and the U.S. Army on the Western Front (1939–1945) — thus Hitler ordered that battles be executed and fought with the same no-quarter brutality with which the Wehrmacht and the Waffen-SS fought the Red Army on the Eastern Front (1941–1945) in the Soviet Union.

=== Military ===
The objective of the Third Reich's Ardennes Counteroffensive (Battle of the Bulge, 16 Dec. 1944 – 25 Jan. 1945) was for the 6th SS Panzer Army, commanded by SS General Sepp Dietrich, to penetrate the Allied front between the towns of Monschau and Losheimergraben (a cross-border village shared by the municipalities of Hellenthal and Büllingen), then cross the River Meuse, and afterwards assault and capture the city of Antwerp.

For their part of the Ardennes counter-attack, the Kampfgruppe Peiper was the armored spearhead of the left wing of the 6th SS Panzer Army, under the command of SS-Obersturmbannführer Joachim Peiper. After the Waffen-SS infantry had breached the U.S. lines, Peiper was to advance his tanks and armored vehicles on the road to Ligneuville and travel through the towns of Stavelot, Trois-Ponts, and Werbomont in order to reach and seize the bridges over the River Meuse that are in the vicinity of the city of Huy. Because the strategy of the Ardennes Counteroffensive had reserved the roads with the strongest roadway for the bulk traffic of the tanks of the 1st SS Panzer Division Leibstandarte SS Adolf Hitler, the convoys of Kampfgruppe Peiper traveled secondary roads with weak roadways that proved unsuitable for the weights of armored military vehicles, such as Tiger II tanks.

== German advance to the west ==
=== German attack ===
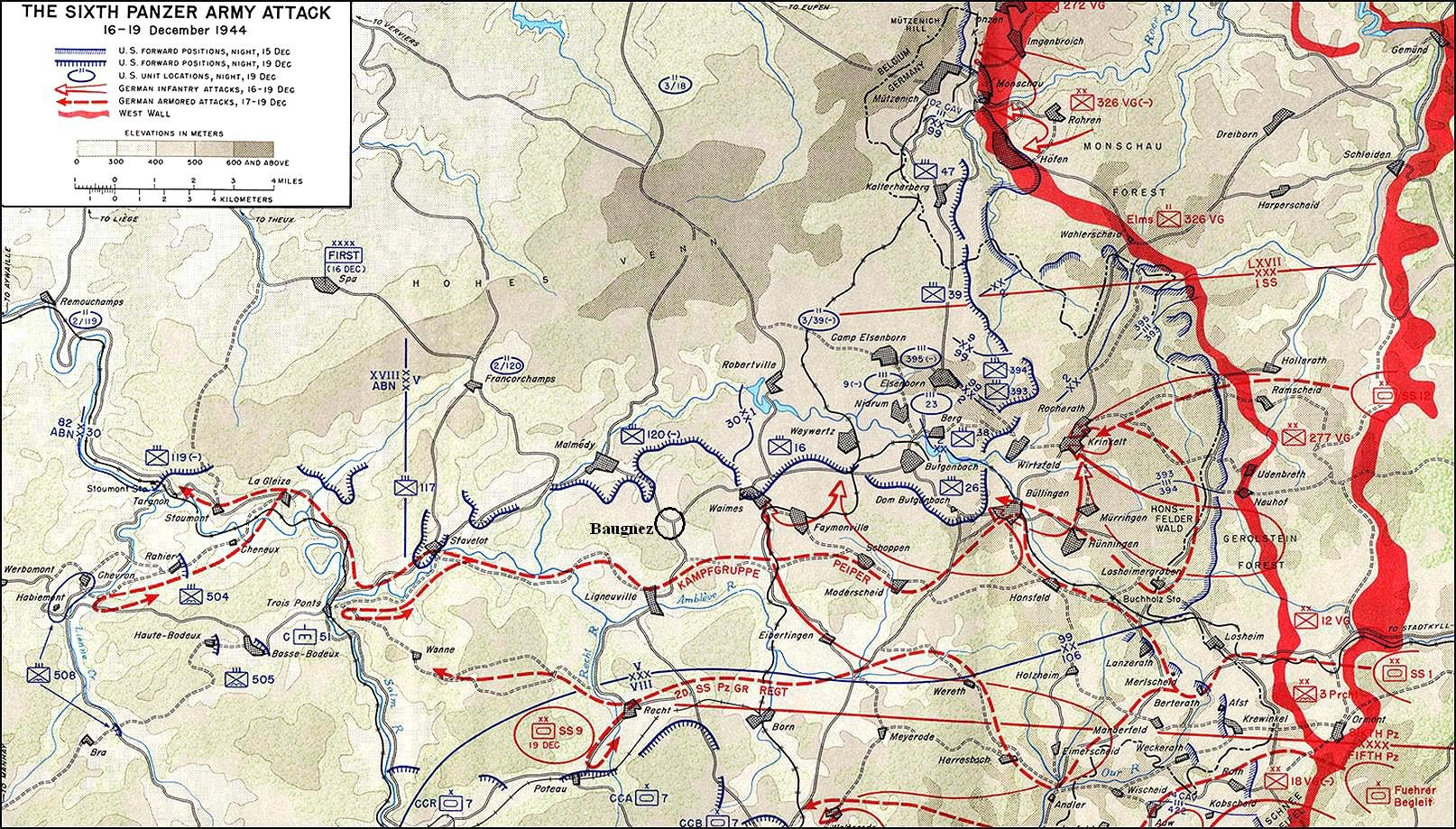
Route of the Waffen-SS Kampfgruppe Peiper: the black circle near the center indicates the Baugnez crossroads where Waffen-SS soldiers killed 84 U.S. Army POWs, in a massacre at Malmedy, Belgium, on 17 December 1944

In December 1944, for the Ardennes Counteroffensive the Germans' initial, strategic position was east of the German-Belgium border and the Siegfried Line, near the town of Losheim, Belgium. To realize the German advance to the west, SS General Dietrich planned for the 6th SS Panzer Army to advance northwest, through Losheimergraben and Bucholz Station, and then drive 72 miles (116 km) through the towns of Honsfeld and Büllingen, and through the villages of Trois-Ponts, to then reach Belgian Route Nationale N23, and then cross the River Meuse.

For their part in the German advance to the west, Kampfgruppe Peiper was to travel the Lanzerath-Losheimergraben road and advance onto the town of Losheimergraben, immediately following the Waffen-SS infantry tasked to capture the villages and towns immediately west of the International Highway. A destroyed bridge thwarted Peiper's tactical plan; earlier in 1944, the retreating Germans had destroyed the Losheim-Losheimergraben bridge over the railroad, which in mid-December 1944 prevented Kampfgruppe Peiper from traveling that route to their objective — the town of Losheimergraben.

Moreover, Peiper's alternative route also was thwarted, because the selected railroad overpass bridge could not bear the weight of armored military vehicles. In the event, the German combat engineers were slow to repair the damaged roadway of the Losheim-Losheimergraben road, which delay detoured the convoy of tanks and armored vehicles of Kampfgruppe Peiper onto the road through the town of Lanzerath en route to Bucholz Station.

=== American counter-attack ===
The Germans were surprised that the Ardennes Counteroffensive on the northern front — the frontline "bulge" in the Battle of the Bulge — met much resistance from the U.S. Army; for most of a day, an American reconnaissance platoon of 22 soldiers (18 infantrymen and four artillery observers) battled and delayed approximately 500 Waffen-SS paratroops in the village of Lanzerath, Belgium. The reconnaissance platoon's defense of the village halted the Kampfgruppe Peiper convoy of tanks and armored vehicles for almost an entire day, slowing its advance towards the River Meuse and the city of Antwerp; the delay allowed the U.S. Army time to reinforce against the expected attacks by the Waffen-SS.

At dusk, the German 9th Parachute Regiment (3rd Parachute Division) out-flanked and captured the American reconnaissance platoon as they withdrew for want of ammunition to continue the fight — halting the progress of Kampfgruppe Peiper through the village of Lanzerath. In that battle, the Waffen-SS paratroops killed one of the artillery observers and wounded 14 of the other American soldiers. Upon capturing the American reconnaissance platoon, the paratroops paused their attack out of caution, believing that a greater force of American infantry and tanks was hiding in the woods. For more than 12 hours, the over-cautious soldiers of the 9th Parachute Regiment did not act until the midnight arrival of Peiper's tanks to Lanzerath; then the Waffen-SS paratroops explored and found no American soldiers in the woods.

== Massacre at Büllingen ==
At 4:30 a.m. on 17 December 1944, the 1st SS Panzer Division was approximately 16 hours behind schedule when the convoys departed the village of Lanzerath enroute west to the town of Honsfeld. After capturing Honsfeld, Peiper detoured from his assigned route to seize a small fuel depot in Büllingen, where the Waffen-SS infantry summarily executed dozens of U.S. POWs. Afterward, Peiper advanced to the west, toward the River Meuse and captured Ligneuville, bypassing the towns of Mödersheid, Schoppen, Ondenval, and Thirimont. The terrain and poor quality of the roads made the advance of Kampfgruppe Peiper difficult. At the exit to the village of Thirimont, the armored spearhead was unable to travel the road directly to Ligneuville, and Peiper deviated from the planned route: Rather than turning to the left, the armored spearhead turned to the right, and advanced toward the crossroads of Baugnez, equidistant from the cities of Malmedy, Ligneuville, and Waimes.

== Massacre at Baugnez crossroads ==
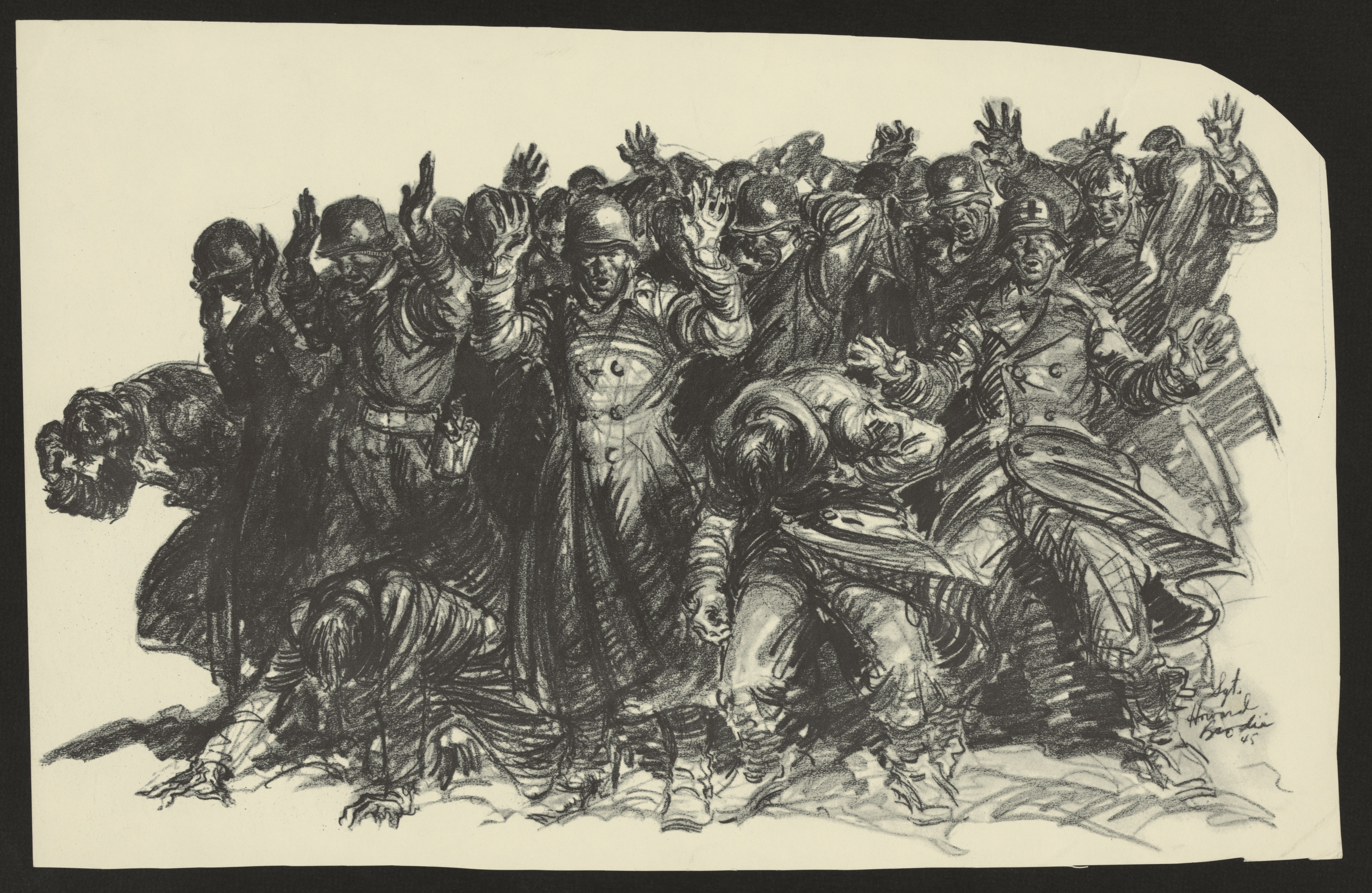
A 1945 depiction of the massacre of G.I.s in a farmer's field, by war artist Howard Brodie

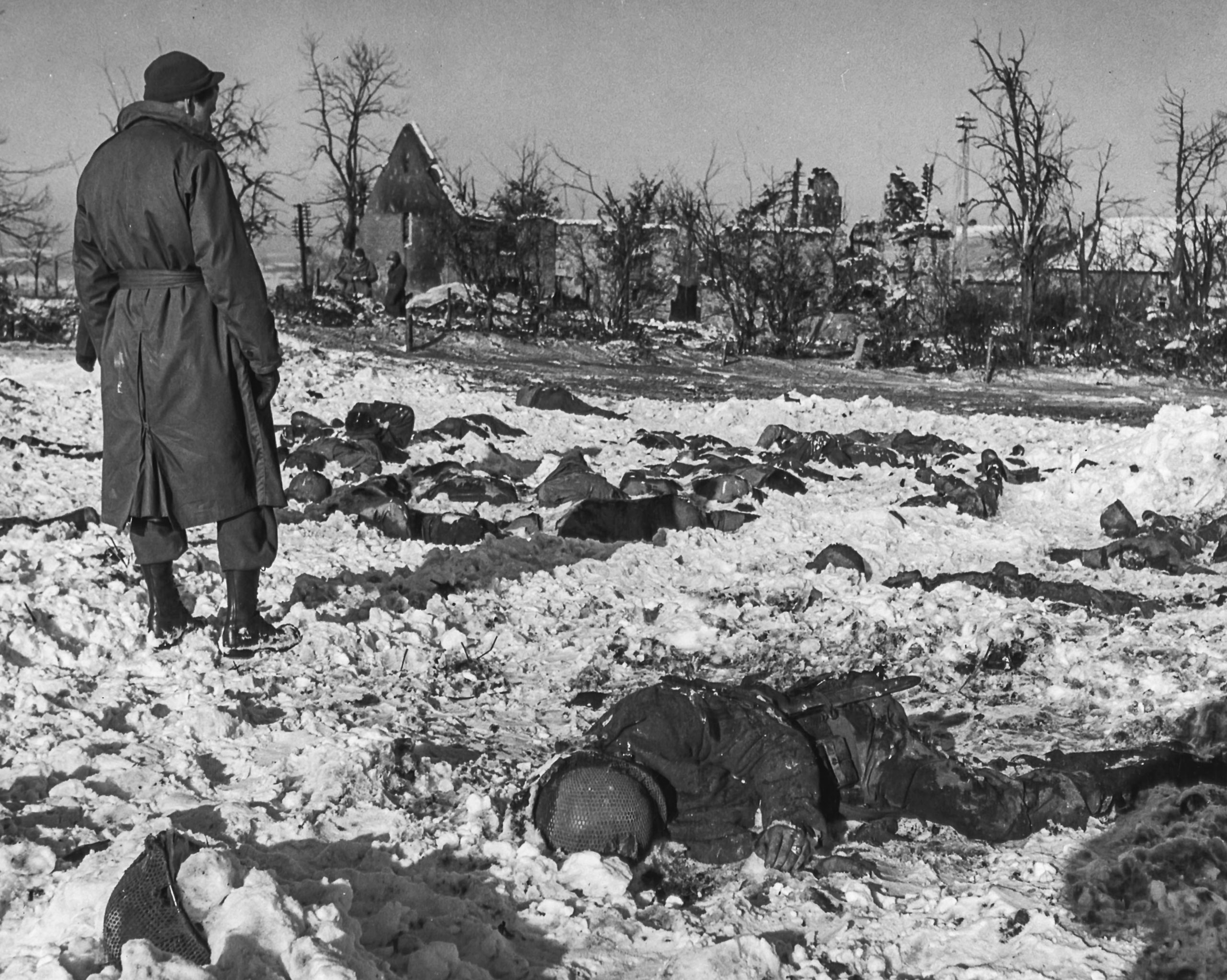
In January 1945, a U.S. soldier views corpses of 84 executed U.S. POWs

On 17 December 1944, between noon and 1:00 p.m., Kampfgruppe Peiper approached the Baugnez crossroads, two miles southeast of the city of Malmedy, Belgium. Meanwhile, a U.S. Army convoy of thirty vehicles, from B Battery of the 285th Field Artillery Observation Battalion, was negotiating the crossroads, and then turning right, towards Ligneuville and St. Vith, in order to join the US 7th Armored Division. The Germans saw the US convoy first, and the spearhead unit of Kampfgruppe Peiper fired upon and destroyed the first and last vehicles, immobilizing the convoy and halting the American advance. Out-numbered and out-gunned, those soldiers of the 285th Field Artillery surrendered to the Waffen-SS.

After that brief battle with the American convoy, the tanks and armored vehicles of the Kampfgruppe Peiper convoy continued westward to Ligneuville. At the Baugnez crossroads, the Waffen-SS infantry assembled the just-surrendered U.S. POWs in a farmer's field, and added them to another group of U.S. POWs who had been captured earlier that day. The prisoners of war who survived the massacre at Malmedy said that a group of approximately 120 U.S. POWs stood in the farmer's field when the Waffen-SS fired machine guns at them. Panicked by the machine gun fire, some POWs fled, but the Waffen-SS soldiers shot and killed most of the remaining POWs where they stood. Some G.I.s dropped to the ground and pretended to be dead. After machine-gunning the group of POWs, the Waffen-SS soldiers walked amongst the POW corpses, searching for wounded survivors to kill with a coup de grâce gunshot to the head. Some of the fleeing POWs ran to and hid in a café at the Baugnez crossroads. The Waffen-SS then set the café afire, and killed every U.S. POW who escaped the burning building.

=== Responsibility ===
There is dispute over which Waffen-SS officer ordered the killing of U.S. POWs at Malmedy. Peiper, who had already left the Baugnez crossroads where the massacre occurred, and the commander of the 1st Panzer Battalion, Werner Poetschke, are both considered most likely responsible. After the end of the war, Poetschke was identified by various persons involved and eyewitnesses as the officer directly responsible for the initiative and for giving the order to subaltern officers to execute the American prisoners near the Baugnez crossroads. Whether or not Peiper himself gave the actual order, in addition to his command responsibility, he was responsible for creating the unit's prevailing culture, in which caring for prisoners of war was a burden to be avoided.

== Massacre revealed ==
In the early afternoon of 17 December 1944, 43 U.S. POWs who survived the Malmedy massacre emerged from hiding from the Waffen-SS and then sought help and medical aid in the nearby city of Malmedy, which was held by the U.S. Army. The first of the 43 survivors of the massacre were encountered by a patrol from the 291st Combat Engineer Battalion at about 2:30 p.m. on 17 December, hours after the massacre.

The inspector general of the First Army learned of the Malmedy massacre approximately four hours after the fact; by evening time, rumors that the Waffen-SS were summarily executing U.S. POWs had been communicated to the rank and file soldiers of the U.S. Army in Europe. Unofficial orders spread to not take any SS men prisoner. American soldiers of the 11th Armored Division later summarily executed 80 Wehrmacht POWs in the Chenogne massacre on 1 January 1945.

== Recovery and investigation ==
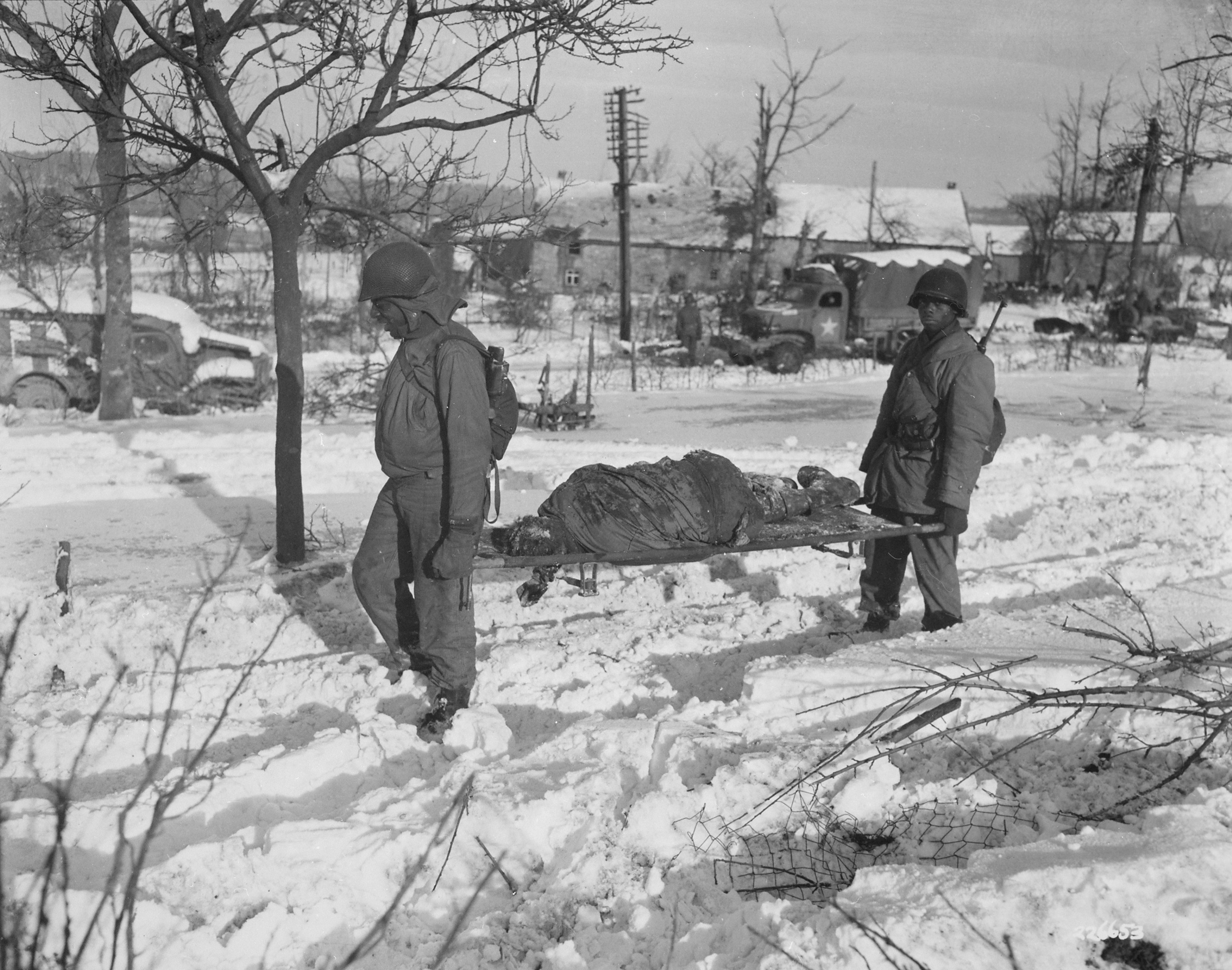
The corpses of the U.S. POWs massacred at Malmedy being removed from the site of the massacre on 14 January 1945

Until the Allied counterattack against the Ardennes Counteroffensive, the crossroads at Baugnez, Belgium, lay behind the Nazi lines until 13 January 1945; and on 14 January, the U.S. Army reached the killing field where the German soldiers had summarily executed 84 U.S. POWs on 17 December 1944. Military investigators photographed the war crime scene and the frozen, snow-covered corpses before they were removed for autopsy and burial.

The forensic investigation documented the gunshot wounds for the war crimes prosecutions of the enemy officers and soldiers who killed U.S. POWs. Twenty of the 84 corpses of the murdered POWs had gunpowder burn residue on the head, indicating a coup de grâce gunshot to the head: a wound not sustained in self-defense. The corpses of 20 soldiers showed evidence of small-calibre gunshot wounds to the head, without the residue of a gunpowder burn; other POW corpses had one wound to the head, either in the temple or behind an ear; and 10 corpses showed fatal blunt trauma head injuries, in which blows by a rifle butt fractured the skull. These head wounds were in addition to the bullet wounds made by the machine guns. Most of the POW corpses were recovered from a small area in the farmer's field, indicating that the Germans grouped the U.S. POWs to shoot them.

=== Responsibility ===
In 1949, a U.S. Senate investigation concluded that in the thirty-six-day Battle of the Bulge the soldiers of Kampfgruppe Peiper murdered between 538 and 749 U.S. POWs. Other investigations claimed that the Waffen-SS killed fewer U.S. POWs, and put the figure of the dead as being between 300 and 375 US soldiers and 111 civilians executed by the Kampfgruppe Peiper.

== War crimes trial ==
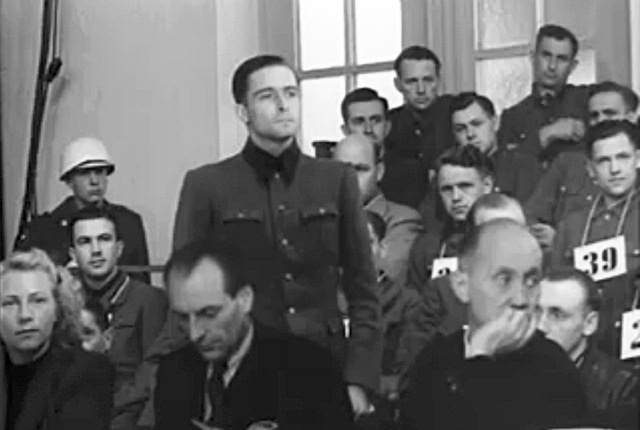
SS-Obersturmbannführer Joachim Peiper during the Malmedy massacre trial

The Malmedy massacre trial, from May to July 1946, established that the commanders in the field bore command responsibility for the Waffen-SS killing surrendered U.S. POWs; specifically Waffen-SS General Josef Dietrich (6th Panzer Army); SS-Sturmbannführer Werner Poetschke (1st SS Panzer Division Leibstandarte SS Adolf Hitler); and SS-Obersturmbannführer Joachim Peiper (Kampfgruppe Peiper) whose soldiers committed the actual war crime at Malmedy.

Regarding command responsibility for the actions of his officers and soldiers, Dietrich said he received from Hitler superior orders that no quarter was to be granted, no prisoners taken, and no pity shown towards Belgian civilians.

The war-crime cases of the Wehrmacht and Waffen-SS soldiers and officers were conducted at the Dachau trials held in the deactivated Dachau concentration camp, in occupied Germany, from 1945 to 1947. The Dachau Trials prosecuted and punished war criminals by imposing 43 death sentences (including Peiper and Dietrich), 22 sentences to life-long imprisonment, and eight sentences to short imprisonment. However, none of the death sentences were carried out, and Peiper and Dietrich were released in 1956 and 1955, respectively.

== See also ==
- List of massacres in Belgium
- Wereth massacre, the torture and killing of eleven African-American prisoners of war in Wereth, committed by the 1st SS Panzer Division on the same day.
- Chenogne massacre, a killing of German POWS carried out by soldiers of the 11th Armored Division (United States) fifteen days later.
- Normandy massacres, a series of killings in which up to 158 Canadian and British prisoners of war were murdered by soldiers of the 12th SS Panzer Division (Hitler Youth) during the Battle of Normandy.
- Massacre of Kondomari, the massacre of Greek civilians in June 1941, committed by German paratroopers.
- War crimes of the Wehrmacht

== Notes ==
i: In Cole's History of World War II, footnote 5 in page 264 reads: 'Thus Fragmentary Order 27. issued by Headquarters, 328th Infantry, on 21 December for the attack scheduled the following day says: "No SS troops or paratroopers will be taken prisoner but will be shot on sight."'
ii: That article includes a diagram showing where the bodies were discovered.
