= SS-Oberst-Gruppenführer =

Highest general rank in the Schutzstaffel

Oberst-Gruppenführer
- Gorget patch

- Shoulder insignia and camo insignia
- Country: Nazi Germany
- Service branch: Schutzstaffel
- Abbreviation: Oberstgruf
- Rank: Four-star
- NATO rank code: OF-9
- Non-NATO rank: O-10
- Formation: 1942
- Abolished: 1945
- Next higher rank: Reichsführer-SS
- Next lower rank: Obergruppenführer
- Equivalent ranks: Generaloberst

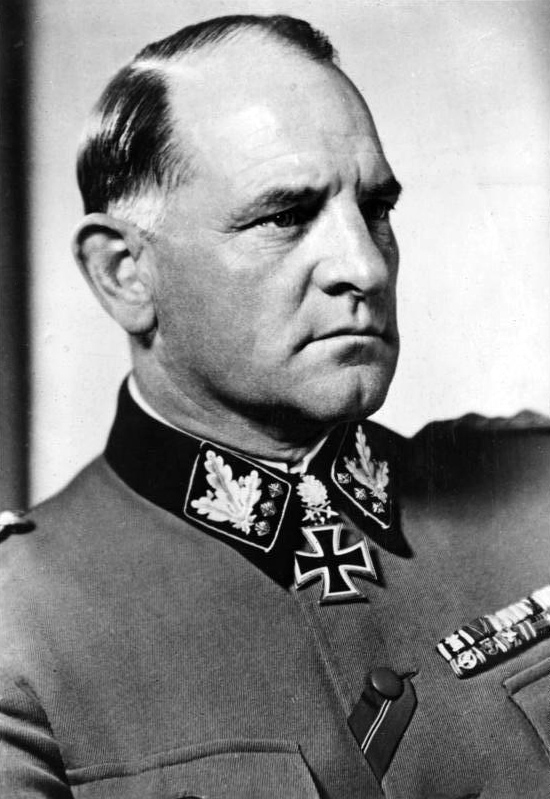
Sepp Dietrich, SS-Oberst-Gruppenführer and Generaloberst of the Waffen-SS

SS-Oberst-Gruppenführer ([ˈoːbɐstˌɡʁʊpm̩fyːʁɐ]) was (from 1942 to 1945) the highest commissioned rank in the Schutzstaffel (SS), under SS commander Heinrich Himmler as Reichsführer-SS. The rank is translated as "highest group leader". The rank was correctly spelled Oberst-Gruppenführer to avoid confusion with the more junior rank of Obergruppenführer.

== Overview ==
Oberst-Gruppenführer was considered the equivalent of a colonel general (Generaloberst) in the German Army, which is generally seen as the equivalent of a four-star general or army general in other armed forces. Under Himmler, the title Reichsführer-SS became the highest possible commissioned rank in the SS hierarchy of the Allgemeine-SS.

The rank of Oberst-Gruppenführer was first proposed in early 1942 as a possible future rank for Waffen-SS commanders who might be promoted to command Army Groups. The Heer leadership immediately opposed the creation of an SS-rank equivalent to Colonel General, since army commanders felt that no SS general should hold such a large amount of authority and that SS combat commands should be restricted to the Corps and Division level. The idea of SS Armies and Army Groups was something few wished to see develop – two SS Armies would eventually be established, (the 6th and the 11th SS Armies). No SS Army Groups were ever created.

== Promotion history ==
In April 1942, on Adolf Hitler's personal authority, the rank of SS-Oberst-Gruppenführer was first bestowed. The appointment was to Nazi Party treasurer and RZM chief Franz Xaver Schwarz. On the same day orders were issued for a dual promotion within the Ordnungspolizei, making Kurt Daluege a Generaloberst der Polizei at the same time. Daluege's rank was the only police promotion to this rank.

The last two of the four Oberst-Gruppenführer promotions were made in 1944, this time to Waffen-SS generals. (Note: Snyder, Louis (1994) p. 66. Dietrich had commanded the 1st SS Panzer Division and the 1st SS Panzer Corps, and would command the 6th SS Panzer Army in the Battle of the Bulge. Hausser had commanded the 2nd SS Panzer Division, the 2nd SS Panzer Corps and the 7th Army, and would command Army Group G.) Dietrich's date of rank was back-dated to 1942, making him the most senior officer of the Waffen-SS. The final seniority list was as follows:

- Franz Xaver Schwarz, 20 April 1942 (... der Allgemeinen SS)
- Josef "Sepp" Dietrich, 20 April 1942 (... und Panzer-Generaloberst der Waffen-SS)
- Kurt Daluege, 20 April 1942 (... und Generaloberst der Polizei)
- Paul Hausser, 1 August 1944 (... und Generaloberst der Waffen-SS)

Franz Xaver Schwarz, who held Ehrenführer (honorary leader), was the only holder of the rank who was not granted equivalent police or Waffen-SS rank. The Oberst-Gruppenführer rank was worn on the field-grey Waffen-SS tunic, the grey SS service tunic, or in Daluege's case the German police uniform. There are no photographic records of the insignia ever being worn on the black ceremonial uniform, which had largely fallen into disuse by the time the rank was created.

In 1944, Himmler offered to appoint Albert Speer to the honorary rank of Oberst-Gruppenführer. Speer declined, not wishing to formally be subordinate to Himmler. Himmler's successor, Karl Hanke, never held the rank of Oberst-Gruppenführer, but was appointed Reichsführer-SS from the lower grade of Obergruppenführer. Hans-Adolf Prützmann claimed to have been promoted to the rank in April 1945 by personal decree of Adolf Hitler; Prützmann's claim is not supported by either documentary or photographic evidence, leading most history texts to list his final rank as Obergruppenführer.

Junior rank Obergruppenführer	SS rank Oberst-Gruppenführer	Senior rank Reichsführer-SS

== See also ==
- Corps colours (Waffen-SS)
- List of SS-Oberst-Gruppenführer
- Ranks and insignia of the Waffen-SS
