= Baugnez =

Coordinates: 50.404°N 6.067°E

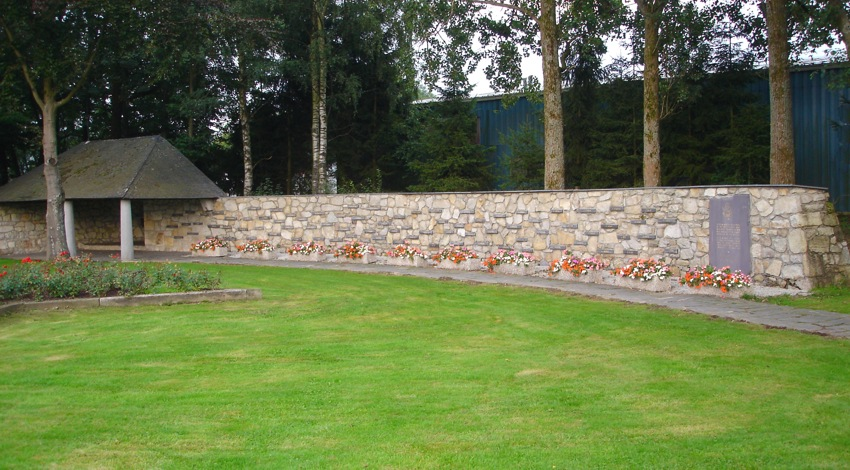
The low stone wall bearing a plaque recounting the Malmedy massacre and 72 black stones inset into the wall, each one commemorating a man who died.

Baugnez is a hamlet of Wallonia in the municipality of Malmedy, district of Bévercé, located in the province of Liège, Belgium.

It is notable as being the site of the Malmedy massacre during the Second World War.

Baugnez is situated two miles southeast of the town of Malmedy, on route N62 (E421) between Malmedy and Ligneuville. It stands at the crossroads between N62 (Route de Waimes) and N632. After Baugnez the Route les Waimes follows N632 to Waimes and N62 becomes Route de Luxembourg.

In December 1944 the crossroads at Baugnez was the site of the massacre of more than 70 American prisoners of war by Waffen SS troops under the command of Joachim Peiper.

The site is marked by a memorial comprising a low stone wall bearing a plaque recounting the incident and 72 black stones inset into the wall, each one commemorating a man who died.
