= Sepp Dietrich =

German Nazi politician and SS commander (1892–1966)

- Dietrich in 1944
- Born: Josef Dietrich; 28 May 1892; Hawangen, Kingdom of Bavaria, German Empire
- Died: 21 April 1966 (aged 73); Ludwigsburg, Baden-Württemberg, West Germany
- Military career
- Allegiance: German Empire; Weimar Republic; Nazi Germany
- Branch: Imperial German Army; Bavarian Army; Freikorps; Schutzstaffel; Waffen-SS
- Service years: 1911–1918; 1928–1945
- Rank: SS-Oberst-Gruppenführer and Generaloberst of the Waffen-SS
- Service number: NSDAP #89,015; SS #1,117
- Commands: Leibstandarte SS Adolf Hitler; I SS Panzer Corps; 5th Panzer Army; 6th Panzer Army
- Conflicts: World War I; Silesian Uprisings; Battle of Annaberg; World War II; Battle of France; Battle of Dunkirk; Battle of Greece; Invasion of Yugoslavia; Eastern front; Battle of Normandy; Battle of the Bulge; Battle of Elsenborn Ridge; Operation Spring Awakening
- Awards: Iron Cross First Class (1914); Tank Memorial Badge; Knight's Cross of the Iron Cross with Oak Leaves, Swords and Diamonds
- Other work: Member of HIAG, Waffen-SS lobby group
- Criminal information
- Known for: Night of the Long Knives; Malmedy massacre Wormhoudt massacre
- Status: Deceased
- Convictions: U.S. Military; War crimes West Germany; Accessory to manslaughter (6 counts)
- Penalty: U.S. Military; Life imprisonment; commuted to 25 years imprisonment West Germany; 18 months imprisonment Soviet Union; Death (in absentia)

Josef "Sepp" Dietrich (28 May 1892 – 21 April 1966) was a German general, politician and war criminal in the Schutzstaffel (SS) during the Nazi era.

Despite having no formal staff officer training (and little formal education at all), Dietrich rose to become (along with Paul Hausser) SS-Oberst-Gruppenführer, the highest-ranking commissioned officer rank in the Waffen-SS, the military branch of the SS, commanding units up to the army level during World War II. He joined the Nazi Party in 1928 and was elected to the Reichstag of the Weimar Republic in 1930. Prior to 1929, Dietrich was Adolf Hitler's chauffeur and bodyguard.

Dietrich was assessed to be more valuable for his political loyalty than his military ability, and was considered to have been elevated above his military competence. Generalfeldmarschall Gerd von Rundstedt considered Dietrich to be "decent but stupid". As commanding officer of the 6th Panzer Army during the Battle of the Bulge, Dietrich bore responsibility for the Malmedy massacre, the murder of U.S. prisoners of war in December 1944.

After the war, an American military tribunal convicted Dietrich of war crimes at the Malmedy massacre trial. Upon his release from Landsberg Prison in 1955, Dietrich became active in HIAG, a denialist and lobbying group established by former high-ranking Waffen-SS personnel. He died in 1966 at the age of 73.

== Early life ==
Josef "Sepp" Dietrich was born on 28 May 1892 in Hawangen, near Memmingen in the Kingdom of Bavaria, German Empire.

A butcher's apprentice, Dietrich joined the Bavarian Army with the 4. Bayerische Feldartillerie-Regiment "König" (4th Bavarian Field Artillery Regiment "King") in Augsburg. In the First World War he served with the Bavarian field artillery. He was promoted to Gefreiter (Corporal) in 1917 and awarded the Iron Cross 2nd class. In 1918 he was promoted to Unteroffizier (Sergeant). His last Bavarian Army record lists Dietrich as recipient of the Iron Cross 1st class.

== Interwar period ==
=== In the Weimar Republic ===
After the Great War ended, Dietrich worked at several jobs, including policeman and customs officer. He joined the Freikorps and fought against Polish insurgents during the Silesian Uprisings, but lost his job as a police officer due to his suspected involvement in the Beer Hall Putsch. Dietrich joined the Nazi Party (NSDAP) in 1928, then was hired at Eher Verlag, the NSDAP publisher, and became commander of Hitler's Schutzstaffel (SS) bodyguard. His NSDAP number was 89,015 and his SS number was 1,117. Dietrich had been introduced to Nazism by Christian Weber, who had been his employer at the Tankstelle-Blauer-Bock filling station in Munich. He accompanied Hitler on his tours around Germany. Later Hitler arranged other jobs for him, including various SS posts, and let him live in the Reich Chancellery. At the election of 14 September 1930, he was elected as a deputy to the Reichstag from the electoral list of the Nazi Party. He would remain in the Reichstag until the fall of the Nazi regime in May 1945, representing several different electoral districts: Upper Bavaria–Swabia (Wahlkreis #24, from the election of July 1932), Lower Bavaria–Upper Palatinate (#25, from the election of November 1933) and Frankfurt an der Oder (#5, from the election of April 1938).

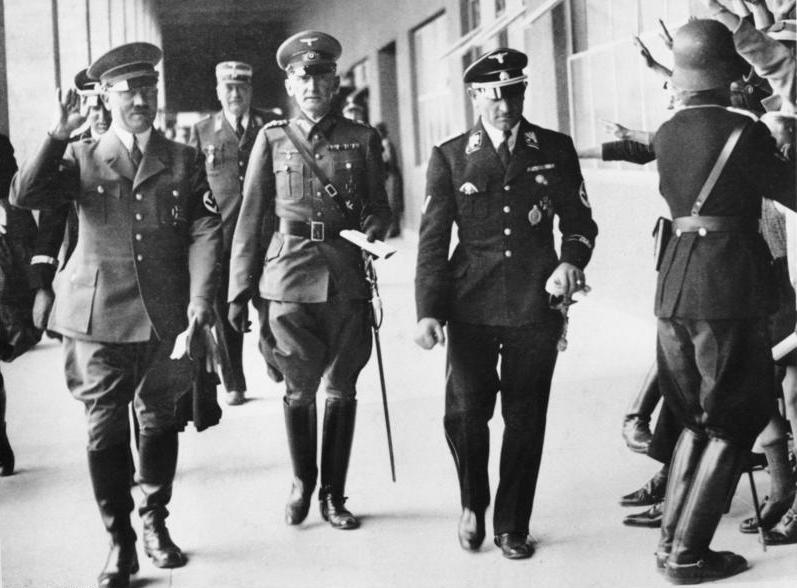
Hitler with Dietrich in Berlin during the 1936 Summer Olympics

By 1931, Dietrich had been promoted to SS-Gruppenführer. When the Nazi Party seized power in 1933, he rose swiftly through the hierarchy. At the end of 1933, Prussian Minister President Hermann Göring appointed Dietrich to the recently reconstituted Prussian State Council, where he would continue to serve until 1945. Responsible for Hitler's personal security detail since February 1932, Dietrich became the commander of the SS–Sonderkommando Berlin (SS–Special Command Unit Berlin) on 2 August 1933. This special bodyguard unit was renamed Leibstandarte SS Adolf Hitler (LSSAH) on 13 April 1934. As one of Hitler's intimates, Dietrich was often able to disregard his SS superior, Heinrich Himmler, at one time even banning Himmler from the Leibstandarte barracks. The LSSAH eventually grew into an elite division of the Waffen-SS. Although the unit was nominally under Himmler, Dietrich was the real commander and handled day-to-day administration.

In the summer of 1934, Dietrich played a key role in the Night of the Long Knives. Hitler, along with Dietrich and a unit from the Leibstandarte, travelled to Bad Wiessee to personally oversee Ernst Röhm's arrest on 30 June. Later, at approximately 17:00 hours, Dietrich received orders from Hitler for the Leibstandarte to form an "execution squad" and go to Stadelheim prison, where certain Sturmabteilung (SA) leaders were being held. There in the prison courtyard, the Leibstandarte firing squad shot six SA officers, including Edmund Heines. Additional SA personnel identified by the regime as traitors were shot in Berlin by a unit of the Leibstandarte after Hitler told him to take six men and go to the Ministry of Justice to shoot certain SA leaders. Shortly thereafter, Dietrich was promoted to SS-Obergruppenführer. Dietrich's role later earned him an 18-month sentence from a postwar court.

== World War II ==
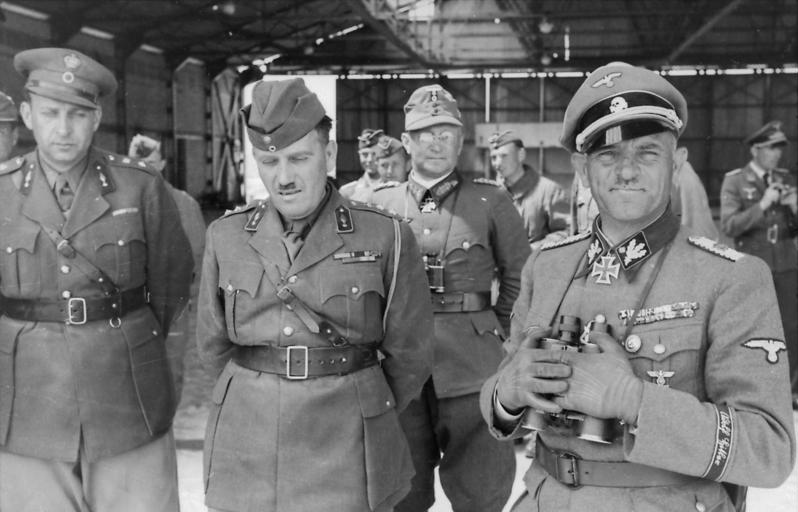
Dietrich in Greece, April 1941

After World War II began in Europe, Dietrich led the Leibstandarte during the German advance into Poland and later the Netherlands. After the Dutch surrender, the Leibstandarte moved south to France on 24 May 1940. They took up a position 15 miles southwest of Dunkirk along the line of the Aa Canal, facing the Allied defensive line near Watten. That night the OKW ordered the advance to halt, with the British Expeditionary Force (BEF) trapped. The Leibstandarte paused for the night. However, on the following day, in defiance of Hitler's orders, Dietrich ordered his III Battalion to cross the canal and take the heights beyond, where BEF artillery observers were putting the regiment at risk. They assaulted the heights and drove the observers off. Instead of being censured for his act of defiance, Dietrich was awarded the Knight's Cross of the Iron Cross. During this campaign members of the Leibstandarte 2nd Battalion were responsible for the murder of 81 British and French prisoners of war in what became known as the Wormhoudt massacre.

Dietrich remained in command of the Leibstandarte throughout the campaigns in Greece and Yugoslavia before being promoted to command of the 1st SS Panzer Corps, attached to Army Group Center, on the Eastern Front. In 1943, he was sent to Italy to recover Benito Mussolini's mistress Clara Petacci. He received numerous German military medals.

Dietrich commanded the 1st SS Panzer Corps in the Battle of Normandy. He rose to command 5th Panzer Army during the later stages of this campaign. Hitler gave him command of the newly created 6th Panzer Army. Dietrich led it in the Battle of the Bulge (December 1944–January 1945). He had been assigned to that task because, due to the 20 July Plot, Hitler distrusted Wehrmacht officers. On 17 December, Kampfgruppe Peiper—an SS unit under his overall command—murdered 84 U.S. prisoners of war near Malmedy, Belgium, in what is known as the Malmedy massacre.

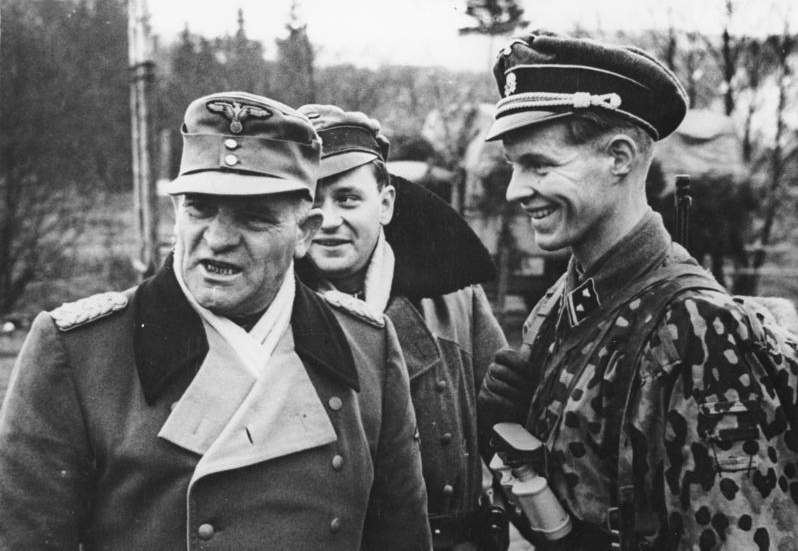
Dietrich during the Battle of the Bulge, January 1945

In March 1945 Dietrich's 6th Panzer Army and the LSSAH spearheaded Operation Spring Awakening, an offensive in Hungary near Lake Balaton aimed at securing the last oil reserves still available to Germany. Despite early gains, the offensive was too ambitious in scope and failed. After that failure, the 6th SS Panzer Army (and LSSAH) retreated to the Vienna area. As a mark of disgrace, the Waffen-SS units involved in the battle were ordered by Hitler to remove their treasured cuff titles bearing his name. Dietrich did not relay the order to his troops. Shortly thereafter, Dietrich's troops were forced to retreat from Vienna by Soviet Red Army forces. Dietrich, accompanied by his wife, surrendered on 9 May 1945 to the U.S. 36th Infantry Division in Austria.

== Assessment ==
Dietrich had the complete confidence of Hitler because of his loyalty; the old political fighter was one of Hitler's favorites. He therefore enjoyed much lavish publicity, numerous decorations and a rapid series of promotions. Dietrich often took gambles, much to the dislike of the OKW, such as when he sent the Leibstandarte division "charging into Rostov" without orders "purely to gain a prestige victory". Once Dietrich was promoted to a Corps command, he was at least assisted by competent staff officers who had been transferred from the army; still, the army command had to take some pains to keep him in line.

By 1944, there were clear signs Dietrich had been elevated above his military competence. He reportedly had never been taught how to read a military map. Generalfeldmarschall Gerd von Rundstedt considered him to be "decent but stupid" and was especially critical of Dietrich's handling of the 6th Panzer Army in the Ardennes. Even Dietrich's principal staff officer conceded that he was "no strategic genius".

Dietrich's long, personal acquaintance with Hitler allowed him to be more frank than other senior officers in his interactions with Hitler. He was reported by a fellow general to have "railed against the Führer and [his] entourage" with promises to let Hitler know that he was "leading us all to destruction". (Note: "Sepp Dietrich railed against the Führer and [the Führer's] entourage to such an extent that it became most unpleasant. Then, he was sent for, and he said: 'All right, that's fine but I shall speak my mind. I shall tell Adi'—he always calls Hitler 'Adi'—'that he is leading us all to destruction'." Spoken by General der Panzertruppe Heinrich Eberbach while in captivity in Britain and secretly taped by the MI-19 Directorate of the British Military Intelligence.)

== Honours ==
- Golden party badge of the NSDAP
- Honour Chevron of the Old Guard
- Tank Memorial Badge
- SS Honour Ring (Deathshead ring)
- Blood Order
- Anschluss Medal
- Iron Cross 2nd Class 1914, Clasp for 1939
- Iron Cross 1st Class 1914, Clasp for 1939
- Knights Cross of the Iron Cross, with Oakleaves, Swords and Diamonds.
- Pilot's Badge (Honorary)

== Conviction ==
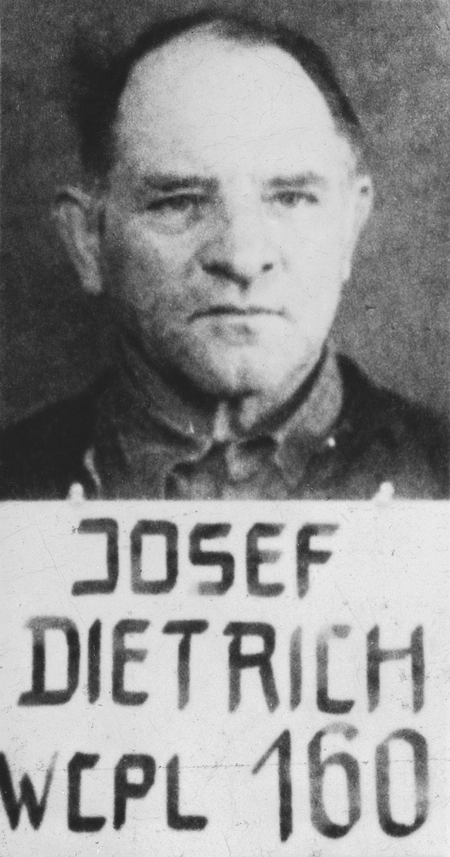
Mugshot of Dietrich in Landsberg Prison

In 1943, Dietrich was sentenced to death in absentia by the Soviet Union for war crimes committed by his men in Kharkiv. However, after the war, the Soviets did not push for his extradition. Dietrich was tried as Defendant No. 11 by the U.S. Military Tribunal at Dachau (United States of America vs. Valentin Bersin et al., Case No. 6-24), from 16 May 1946 until 16 July 1946. On that day he was sentenced to life imprisonment in the Malmedy massacre trial for his involvement in ordering the execution of U.S. prisoners of war. Dietrich was found guilty of issuing orders that "troops were to be preceded by a wave of terror and fright, that no humane inhibitions were to be shown, and that every resistance was to be broken by terror," and that prisoners of war were to be shot, "if necessary, in very compelling situations."

Due to testimony in his defence by other German officers, Dietrich's sentence was shortened to 25 years. He was imprisoned at the Landsberg Prison in Bavaria. Dietrich served only ten years and was released on parole on 22 October 1955.

Dietrich was re-arrested in Ludwigsburg in August 1956. He, along with former SS-Standartenführer Michael Lippert, was charged by the Landgericht München I and tried from 6 to 14 May 1957 for their role in the killing of SA leaders during the Night of the Long Knives in 1934. Dietrich was sentenced to 18 months for his part in that purge, after being convicted as an accessory to manslaughter for providing a firing squad for the executions of six SA men. After losing his appeals, Dietrich was returned to Landsberg Prison on 7 August 1958. He was released due to a heart condition and circulation problems in his legs on 6 February 1959.

== Later life ==
Upon his release from prison, Dietrich took an active part in the activities of HIAG, an organization and lobby group of former Waffen-SS members. Founded by former high-ranking Waffen-SS personnel, it campaigned for the legal, economic and historical rehabilitation of the Waffen-SS, with some success. In 1966, Dietrich died of a heart attack. Six thousand people, including many former SS men, attended his funeral. Dietrich was married twice: he was divorced from his first wife in 1937 and remarried in 1942. He had three children. Before his second marriage, Dietrich was a visitor to the Salon Kitty.

== See also ==
- Register of SS leaders in general's rank
- 1st SS Panzer Division Leibstandarte SS Adolf Hitler
- List of Nazi Party leaders and officials
- Glossary of Nazi Germany

== Notes ==
Military offices
Preceded by none	Commander of Leibstandarte SS Adolf Hitler; 17 March 1933 – 7 April 1943	Succeeded by SS-Brigadeführer Theodor Wisch
Preceded by none	Commander of I SS Panzer Corps; 4 July 1943 – 9 August 1944	Succeeded by SS-Brigadeführer Fritz Kraemer
Preceded by General of Panzer Troops Heinrich Eberbach	Commander of 5. Panzerarmee; 9 August 1944 – 9 September 1944	Succeeded by General of Panzer Troops Hasso von Manteuffel
Preceded by none	Commander of 6. SS-Panzerarmee; 26 October 1944 – 8 May 1945	Succeeded by dissolved on 8 May 1945
