= Armoured spearhead =

Formation of armoured fighting vehicles

An armoured spearhead (American English: armored spearhead) is a formation of armoured fighting vehicles, mostly tanks, that form the front of an offensive thrust during a battle. The idea is to concentrate as much firepower into a small front as possible so that any defenders in front of them will be overwhelmed. As the spearhead moves forward, infantry units following in the gap behind them form up on both sides of the line of advance to protect the flanks.

The tactic is quite risky. A determined enemy can counterattack against the rear guard on the flanks and behind, which cuts the spearhead from resupply and quickly brings it to a halt. Thus, the spearhead must move as fast as possible to keep the enemy from attacking in that fashion.

The first use of an armored spearhead was during World War II in the 1940 Battle of France and the German Army's invasion of the Low Countries against the British and the French Armies. Surprising them out of the Ardennes, where the Allies believed that no armoured force could operate, the German spearhead quickly started running for the coast at Dunkirk. The French and British Armies were split on both sides of the German forces and at one point attempted to cut the line with an armored attack on both sides. The resulting Battle of Arras was very close to an Allied success, but a lack of radios or other methods of communication slowed the attack.

Only a few years later new tactics had been developed to effectively counter the armored spearhead. By attacking with small units just at the "corners" of the spearhead, a defender could maneuver the corner armored units to avoid combat instead of slowing down to engage. By repeating this maneuver a defender can narrow the front of the spearhead until it no longer commands enough width for the following infantry to effectively move. When the Germans tried the same tactic again in 1944 during the Battle of the Bulge, the US Army could quickly "pick the corners" in that fashion and brought the spearhead to a halt within a few days. The tactics of the German Blitzkrieg breakthrough were to spearhead the attack with massed armour, sometimes a whole Panzer division of 240 tanks moving in "combat echelon", but was intimately supported by mechanized artillery and infantry formations.

== See also ==
- Flying wedge
