= 6th Panzer Army =

- 6. Panzerarmee
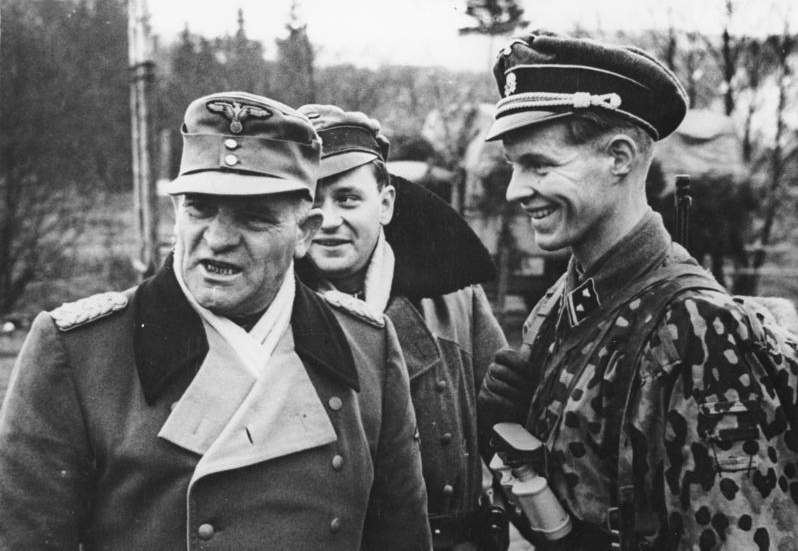
- SS-Oberst-Gruppenführer Sepp Dietrich (left) with men of the 6th Panzer Army, 1945
- Active: 1944–1945
- Country: Nazi Germany
- Branch: German Army
- Type: Panzer
- Role: Armoured warfare
- Size: Army
- Engagements: World War II; Battle of the Bulge; Operation Spring Awakening; Vienna offensive

Commanders
- Notable commanders: Sepp Dietrich

The 6th Panzer Army (German: 6. Panzerarmee) was a formation of the German Army, formed in the autumn of 1944. The 6th Panzer Army was first used as an offensive force during the Battle of the Bulge, in which it operated as the northernmost element of the German offensive. The army was subsequently transferred to Hungary in early 1945 and used in both offensive and defensive actions there. The final battles of the 6th Panzer Army were fought in Austria, preventing its fall to Soviet forces. The remnants of the army eventually surrendered to the United States Army. The army's commander throughout its existence, SS-Oberst-Gruppenführer Josef Dietrich said in early 1945: "We call ourselves the 6th Panzer Army, because we've only got six Panzers left."

== Unit history ==
The 6th Panzer Army is best noted for its leading role in the Battle of the Bulge (December 16, 1944 – January 25, 1945).

Although it never received an SS designation, calling it the 6th SS Panzer Army came into general use in military history literature after the Second World War, most likely due to being led by a SS General and commanding many SS units or to separate it from the Wehrmacht's 6th Army.

The attack of the 6th Panzer Army into the Ardennes in December 1944 failed to swiftly break the American defensive line and lost valuable time because of U.S. defensive efforts at locations like Monschau on the German border. Despite the allocation of SS panzer divisions, the 6th Panzer Army only managed a minor penetration into the northern defensive sector of the U.S. VIII Corps and its advance was thereafter checked by U.S. reinforcements arriving on the northern flank of the offensive. After the Ardennes Offensive, the 6th Panzer Army was transferred to Hungary, where it fought against the advancing Soviet Army.

In March 1945, after the fall of Budapest, the 6th Panzer Army launched one of the final German offensives of the war, Operation Frühlingserwachen around Lake Balaton. This was an attempt to protect the last sources of petroleum controlled by the Germans. The offensive lacked operational surprise, but Soviet Front commander Fyodor Tolbukhin's awareness of the presence of elite SS units, under direct orders from STAVKA Tolbukhin was ordered to use minimal forces against the SS until a counteroffensive could be made in strength north of Lake Balaton. On March 16 the 3rd Ukrainian Front launched its major counteroffensive and Joseph Goebbels admitted in his diary that failure was likely. Three days later, the Germans were thrown back at their original starting positions. The 1st, 2nd, 9th, and 12th SS Panzer Divisions were reduced to 31 operational armored fighting vehicles by March 15, 1945, while Army Group South as a whole retained 772 operational tanks and assault guns as of March 16, 1945.

However, the German forces broke under the Soviet Red Army counteroffensive and retreated towards Austria to defend Vienna. In April 1945, the 6th Panzer Army defended Vienna against the advancing Soviets, but was unable to prevent a Soviet conquest of the city. When the war ended on May 8, 1945, the 6th Panzer Army was in Austria between Vienna and Linz, in which area it subsequently surrendered to forces of the Soviet and U.S. Armies.

Surrender of 6th Panzer Army formations (order of battle as of May 7, 1945) Source 1: Rolf Stoves, Die gepanzerten und motorisierten deutsche Grossverbände 1935–1945 Source 2: Georg Tessin, Verbände und Truppen der deutschen Wehrmacht und Waffen-SS 1939–1945 Volume 3
Unit	Date of Surrender	Surrender Location	To which forces
1st SS Panzer Division	May 9, 1945	Steyr, Austria	U.S. Army
2nd SS Panzer Division	May 9, 1945	Linz, Austria	U.S. Army
9th SS Panzer Division	May 8, 1945	Steyr, Austria	U.S. Army
12th SS Panzer Division	May 8, 1945	near Enns, Austria	U.S. Army
37th SS Volunteer Cavalry Division	May 9, 1945	Steyr, Austria	U.S. Army
Führer Grenadier Division	? May 1945	Zwettl, Austria	U.S. Army
117th Light Infantry Division	? May 1945	Steyr, Austria	U.S. Army
6th Panzer Division	? May 1945	Austria	U.S. Army
356th Infantry Division	? May 1945	Wiener-Neustadt, Austria	U.S. Army
710th Infantry Division	? May 1945	Steyr, Austria	U.S. Army
10th Parachute Division	? May 1945	Jihlava, Czechoslovakia	Red Army
1st Mountain Brigade (Hungary)	? May 1945	Austria	U.S. Army
1st Hussar division (Hungary)	? May 1945	Austria	U.S. Army and Red Army
