= Ignazio Vian =

Italian officer (1917–1944)

- Born: 9 February 1917; Venice, Kingdom of Italy
- Died: 22 July 1944 (aged 27); Turin, Italian Social Republic
- Military career
- Allegiance: Kingdom of Italy
- Branch: Royal Italian Army
- Service years: 1940–1943
- Rank: Lieutenant
- Conflicts: World War II
- Awards: Gold Medal of Military Valour (posthumous)

Ignazio Vian (9 February 1917 – 22 July 1944) was an Italian officer and Resistance leader during World War II.

== Biography ==
He was born in Venice on February 9, 1917, to Agostino Vian and Giuseppina Castagna. After attending elementary, middle and high school in Venice, he moved with his family to Rome, where he enrolled in the faculty of education at La Sapienza University. He started working as a teacher in some schools of the capital, but was then called up for military service shortly after Italy's entry into the Second World War and assigned to the 8th Artillery Regiment. He was discharged already in July 1940, but was recalled into service in January 1941, and admitted to attend a course for reserve officers in Arezzo, being commissioned as second lieutenant and assigned to the Border Guard barracks in Boves, Piedmont. Upon learning of the atrocities carried out by the Wehrmacht in the occupied territories, he wrote in a notebook: "This horror is all the more shameful to us in as much as we, children of the martyrs of national independence, natural enemies of all kinds of oppression and brutality, are chained to a madman's chariot and forced to support him, helping the monster of the century with all our means and blood".

Still stationed in Boves when the Armistice of Cassibile was announced on 8 September 1943, Vian rejected German demands to surrender and went into hiding on Mount Bisalta, the mountain overlooking Boves, where he immediately took action to organize a small group of partisans who intended to oppose the German occupation, one of the first such groups to be born in Italy. He was soon joined by dozens of former soldiers from the dissolved Fourth Army; his group grew to some 150 men, which he organized with rules and methods that followed the training received in the army. Within two weeks of the Armistice, Vian's partisans were already waging guerrilla war on the German occupiers on the mountains around Cuneo; on 19 September 1943, following the killing of a German soldier and the capture of another two (belonging to the 1st SS Panzer Division Leibstandarte SS Adolf Hitler) by Vian's men, SS major Joachim Peiper had Boves burned and twenty-three villagers executed.

In spite of this, Vian's partisan group kept growing and continued fighting the occupiers; in March 1944 they joined Major Enrico Martini's 1° Gruppo Divisioni Alpine, of which Vian became deputy commander. On 19 April 1944, however, Vian was arrested by the Germans while on a mission in Turin; he was imprisoned and tortured for weeks in the fruitless attempt to force him to reveal the names of his fellow partisans and their hiding places. He attempted suicide in prison, cutting his veins with a glass shard found on the prisoner transport vehicle that brought him back to prison, but was treated by his jailers so that he could be executed. On 22 July 1944 he was hanged from a tree in the center of Turin together with another three partisans, Battista Bena, Felice Bricarello and Francesco Valentino. Their bodies were left hanging for a week, as the Germans authorities forbade them to be buried as a warning to the population. Vian was posthumously awarded the Gold Medal of Military Valor.
