= Peveragno =

- Comune
- Comune di Peveragno
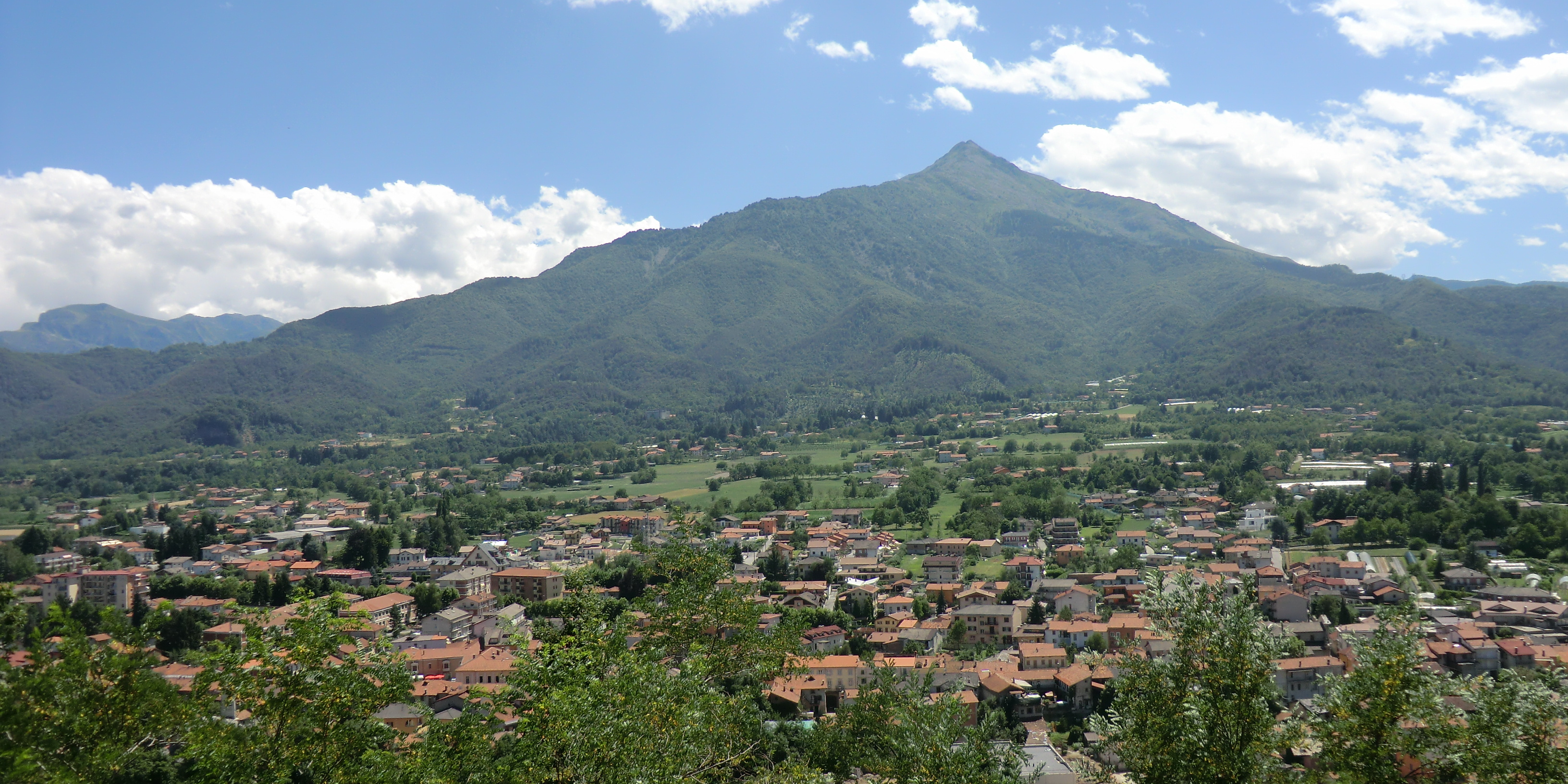

- Coat of arms

- Location within Italy Location within Piedmont
- Coordinates: 44°20′N 7°37′E
- Country: Italy
- Region: Piedmont
- Province: Cuneo (CN)
- Frazioni: Madonna dei Boschi, Montefallonio, Pradeboni, S.Giovenale, S.Lorenzo, S.Margherita

Government
  - Mayor: Paolo Renaudi

Area
  - Total: 68.3 km^{2} (26.4 sq mi)
- Elevation: 575 m (1,886 ft)

Population (1-1-2017)
  - Total: 5,584
  - Density: 81.8/km^{2} (212/sq mi)
- Demonym: Peveragnese(i)
- Time zone: UTC+1 (CET)
  - Summer (DST): UTC+2 (CEST)
- Postal code: 12016
- Dialing code: 0171

Peveragno (Poranh in Occitan, Povragn in Piedmontese) is an Italian town of 5,584 inhabitants (1-1-2017) in the province of Cuneo, in Piedmont.

It belongs to the Union of Communes of the Maritime Alps and to the Occitan language area.

== Awards ==
Silver medal for civil merit "A small town, during the tragic days of the Liberation War, suffered a ferocious reprisal by Nazi troops who rounded up thirty fellow citizens, especially women and older men, brutally masacring them to bursts of gunfire. Admirable example of courage, spirit of freedom and patriotism. " - Peveragno (CN), 10 January 1944

== Geography ==
The town has an average altitude above sea level of 570 meters. At the foot of Mount Bisalta, whose name derives from the fact that it consists of two peaks close to each other but well distinguished, the highest one is 2404 m above sea level. With its main villages, S. Margherita, S. Lorenzo, S. Giovenale, Madonna dei Boschi, Montefallonio, Pradeboni (at an altitude of 950 m above sea level), has more than 5000 inhabitants. The town covers a large valley facing north-east and is protected in the north and west side from the S.Giorgio hill and the foothills of Moncalvino, whereas in the east side is open to Chiusa Pesio and the plain.

To the extensive fields of the flat area follow the chestnut woods, beech, conifers of the hilly area, and finally the high pastures and stony grounds of the mountain over 1500 meters. Peveragno is crossed by two major rivers: Josina, which flows on the east side and Bedale passing through it. There are many trails and paths that allow pleasant and easy walks, by foot or mountain bike, whereas for mountain fans, the highest peaks of Bisalta allow equally attractive excursions as well. Peveragno is 12 km far from the provincial chief town Cuneo, just over 20 km far from Mondovi and from the Turin-Savona highway.

== History ==
Peveragno area, before the Christian era and the subsequent conquest by the Romans, was inhabited by Celtic-Ligurian people whose presence is proven by iron tools and ornaments found on Moncalvino hills (two Paleolithic axes and one from Neolithic) and Castelvecchio. There are numerous archaeological findings on this hill, where you can still see stretches of the city walls dating in a later period (Lombard period).

The first historically documented news dates back to the mid-twelfth century and concern the primitive village of Forfice. This name appears for the first time in a document dated 1153, in which it is mentioned "de Fulchardus Forfece," but it is likely that the village is built decades before (between 1041 and 1153). Forfice is considered the ancestor of Peveragno. The name derives from the particular shape of the valley, which forks in two narrower valleys due to an interpose of an offshoot of Bisalta ("Forfex" i.e. scissor). The villa was located about two kilometers far from Peveragno, in the Madonna dei Boschi village, and was probably built in order to control an important direct road in Provence (passing through Via Grima). There remain today only the ruins of the "castrum" (a fortress), part of the protection moat, the San Pietro chapel and the "Madonna del Borgato" sanctuary (a clear reference to the ancient village of Forfice).

Towards the end of 1200, on the downward trend of the nearby Forfice, it engages the rising star of Peveragno. Piperanium name appeared for the first time in a notarial deed dated 25 September 1299 (sale of a vineyard on the San Giorgio hill). Forfice, perhaps for the plague, or perhaps just because it was in a bad position, will be mentioned for the last time in a document of 1356. What is certain is that his lords moved to the new village, as shown by the effigy of a pillar home in Piazza Santa Maria.

At the time of its foundation, Peveragno with neighboring territories, was owned by the Bishop of Asti. Its name would derive from the Morozzo family of Pipa, dominating places since 1200. In 1369 it became property of the Marquis of Monferrato. In this period (1384) they were written the first municipal statutes, still visible today. In 1396 passed to Achaia, then (1419) to Savoia. With Savoia Peveragno shared all the vicissitudes that accompanied the State of Savoia until the creation of the Italy Kingdom. In 1500 the Inquisition spectrum: dozens of citizens, with the support of the Dominicans (ruins of the monastery are still visible in Piazza San Domenico), were burned at the stake by the terrible inquisitor Biagio de Berra.

In 1621 the Grimaldi lordship took over on Peveragno and Boves that, with different events, will govern Peveragno until the end of 1700. In 1744, during the war for the succession to the Austrian throne, an army of Gallo-Hispanic arrived in Piedmont and poses fire and sword territories surrounding Cuneo. The town, faithful to Savoia, rebelled against the enemy, and was looted three times. In 1800 a slow and inexorable period of population increase started, which brought the town to reach 7878 inhabitants in 1895, in opposition to a strong flow of emigration: thousands of people left, at least until the middle of 1900, to America and France.

Peveragno saw die, as all the rest of Italy, many of its citizens in the trenches of the First World War. To these victims were dedicated the war memorial and the Remembrance Avenue (In Via Vittorio Veneto): every plane tree of the avenue represents a citizen fell in that conflict.

The Second World War, unlike the first, saw the town, after the armistice of 1943, meet in the midst of conflict, suffering the Nazi-Fascist occupation. In the nearby Val Colla (Boves) began the Italian resistance (19 September 1943, before the Nazi retaliation on Boves) and numerous were the partisan bands who found refuge on Bisalta slopes. On Monday morning, 10 January 1944, market day, was put in place the most fierce retaliation Nazi-fascist in Peveragno: because of the finding of 3 German soldiers died, 30 unarmed men were taken and, in different ways, killed. Today in the town there is a square dedicated to this massacre (30 Martyrs Square, previously named Paschetta Square).

The fame of two citizens even crossed national boundaries: Major Pietro Toselli, fell heroically at Amba Alagi in 1895, at age 39; writer, journalist and playwright Vittorio Bersezio, author of dialect comedy "Le miserie 'd Monsù Travet". To these citizens Peveragno erected two monuments: one to Major Toselli, in the homonymous square of the town hall, it is made of bronze and was built by Ettore Ximenes; the other one to Vittorio Bersezio in S. Maria square, it is in marble and was built by the sculptor Leonardo Bistolfi. The old town of Peveragno is full of architectural and artistic evidences of the past.

=== San Giovanni Battista Church ===
The parish church of San Giovanni Battista dates back to 1600 and it was built by Nicolis di Robilant. Particularly interesting is the stone coat of arms of the Grimaldi family (1657), Lords of Peveragno in that period, conserved in the sacristy, carried two beaming suns sculpted alternating to two panes of chess. The church tower was probably one of the towers of the medieval walls.

=== Santa Maria del Paschero Church ===
It is mentioned for the first time in a document of 1396. It becomes independent from the church of San Giovanni in 1585, when the residents of the town overcame the 3300 unit. Originally the church of S. Maria del Paschero had the shape of a quadrangle, it was without choir, with three naves of almost equal height and vault to simply ceiling. In 1725 there were realized several works, which gave it its current appearance: it was built the choir and brick vault, it was raised the central nave and on the lateral naves were opened several windows to give light and air to the building. The bell tower was raised for the first time in 1627, secondly at the beginning of the eighteenth century and thirdly in the years 1871-1872.

In 1878 the facade was enriched by statues of Saints Peter and Paul, and later, in 1972, by a mosaic.

=== San Giorgio Chapel ===
It is located on top of a terraced slope (654 m above sea level), known as "ripa Sancti Georgi" from some fourteenth documents. It was built in the thirteenth century and dedicated to St. George. The committents were, according to the tradition, the deserters of Forfice, that in order to invoke the protection of the saint on the new village that was being born, wanted to dedicate a small temple. In that century it seems raised, in the area next to the chapel, a watch tower belonged to the ancient Morozzo family of Pipa. This tower is mentioned in a document of the Certosa di Pesio dated 21 February 1297 ("que appellatur turris Piparum") and probably was part of a huge system of medieval defense (together with forts placed on Castelvecchio, Moncalvino and Forfice) which granted protection to ancient foothill roads: the "via de Quarantam" that rose from Cuneo to Chiusa Pesio, and the "via Moretia" or "Morocenga" that led to Morozzo.

The chapel stands on an area used since ancient times for religious purposes. In fact, large boulders placed at its base show rock engravings (cups connected by canals present on a sloping surface, probably used for sacrificial purposes). The current building was raised during the Baroque period and has a bell tower in neogothic style, built in 1930 on inspiration of the minarets of Rhodes, by the will of Mario Lago, citizen of Peveragno, at that time Governor of the Dodecanneso. Inside there is one of the oldest pictorial cycles of the Peveragno territory, attributed to Giovanni Mazzucco. The works, greatly damaged by vandals and time, represent: a Crucifixion on the right wall; headless representation of Saint Anthony on the left; the patron saint of the hill in the apse. St. George is depicted on a white horse in the act in which defeats the dragon and liberates the princess. Unfortunately, the princess and the dragon are no longer visible as stolen by "tearing" in the early 90s. But there is a reproduction of the princess "stolen", performed by a citizen, on the facade of his house, located in via Giordana Clans. The axis of the chapel, in the sense apse-door, is oriented to the sunset of the sun during the winter solstice. In that day the sun illuminates the paintings twice: the first time, in the morning, through the splayed window, located on the right wall ("blade" of light brushing the fresco of the crucifixion, starting from the edge where there is the Madonna, then down at the feet of Christ and going to the Magdalene); the second, in the evening, through the front door (lighting of the altar dedicated to St. George). None of this happens in the rest of the year. It should be remembered that the original church was set back from the current seven meters (there was the porch) and had a wider opening. The axis of the chapel, in the sense apse-door, is oriented to the setting of the sun during the winter solstice. On that day the sun illuminates the paintings twice: the first time, in the morning, through the splayed window, located on the right wall ("blade" of light brushing the fresco of the crucifixion, starting from the edge where it is located the Virgin, then down at the feet of Christ and up to Magdalene); the second, in the evening, through the front door (lighting of the altar dedicated to St. George). None of this happens in the rest of the year. It should be remembered that the original church was seven meters rectracted compared the current (there wasn't the arcade) and had a wider opening.

== Sant'Andrea Fair ==
It has ancient origins. Dates back to 1396, the first historical document when it is mentioned this fair, when Princes of Acaja, new owners of this land, who succeeded to the Bishopric of Asti, confirmed to respect, "omnibus et per omnia", all exemptions and concessions referred Peveragno where, there were the fact to keep the market on Monday and the Fair lasting three days. It is concluded that the birth of the Fair was before 1396 '. From an article by G.P. Magnino, researcher and local historian, we report the following notes: "Our Fair was always vital and active, ecc.", and now corresponds to an ethnographic exhibition, handcrafts and enogastronomic of typical local products, with their exposition on the 1st Monday in December in the historic centre of Peveragno.
