= Bisalta =

Mountain in Italy

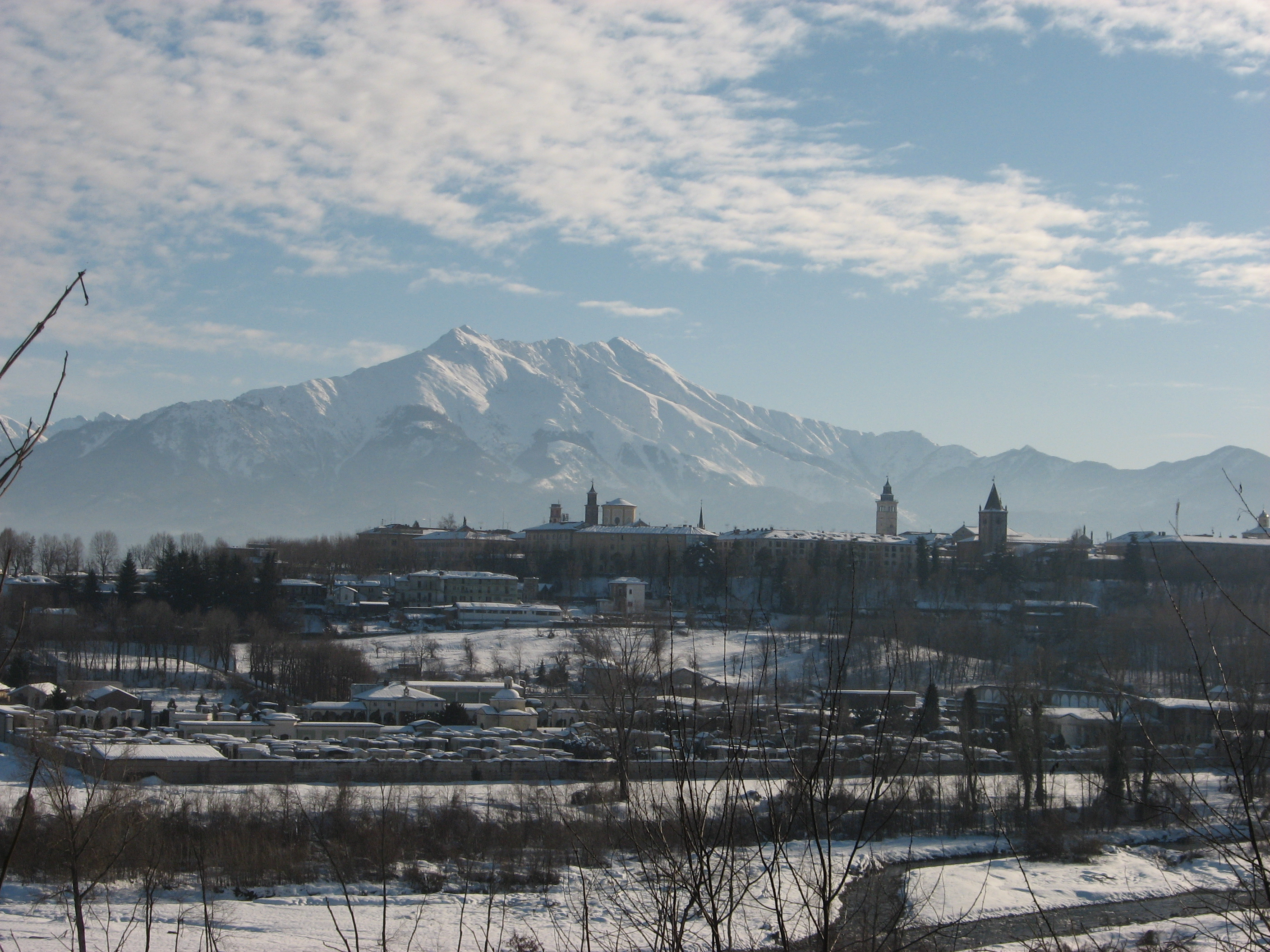
- The Bisalta seen from Cuneo

Highest point
- Elevation: 2,231 m (7,320 ft)
- Prominence: 81 m (266 ft)
- Isolation: 2.19 km (1.36 mi)
- Coordinates: 44°16′12″N 7°36′21″E

Geography
- Location: Piedmont, Italy
- Parent range: Ligurian Alps

The Bisalta also known as Besimauda is a 2,231 metres (7,320 ft) mountain in the Ligurian Alps located at the convergence of the two short valleys of the Colla and Josina streams and the Pesio valley. It affects the municipalities of Peveragno and Boves in the Province of Cuneo.

It has two peaks (the main one 2,231 meters above sea level, the subpeak 2,018 meters above sea level), from which it derives its name ("bis alta", "twice high"). The main peak and the subpeak have a summit cross. Due to its location, the Bisalta is an exceptional panoramic point, allowing to see even the Ligurian Sea on particularly clear days.

Sometimes Bisalta is instead understood to mean the entire mountain range that includes, in addition to the main mountain, Bric Costa Rossa (2,403 m) and the ridge reliefs that connect the two mountains.

In the 19th century, the Bisalta was climbed by mountaineers such as Douglas Freshfield and W. A. B. Coolidge. During the Second World War, it became a base for Italian partisan groups (Boves massacre). In the 1950s Felice Ippolito carried out prospections in the search of uranium, and in July 1960 a lightning killed four people when it hit the summit cross during a religious ceremony.

== Description ==
The mountain has a distinctive trapezoidal shape. The summit part of the mountain is split into two elevations; the southern one is the highest (2,231 m) and is topped by a tall metal cross. A cross also rises on the northern anticima at an altitude of 2,018. At Bisalta, the Costa del Mula, a ridge of stacked boulders rising from the east, converges on the Colla-Pesio watershed ridge. The slopes are rocky-detritus, colonized mainly on the Josina side by low shrubs and meager, steep pastures.

Because of its advanced position toward the plains, the Bisalta is one of the most scenic mountains in Piedmont: from its summit, one can embrace a wide stretch of the Alpine arc and, on clear days, one's gaze can reach as far as the Ligurian Sea. Thanks to its characteristic shape, it is easily spotted from the plains and visible from far away.

== History and legends ==
According to a rather widespread legend, the mountain peak owes its bifid conformation to a devilish intervention. The legend says that a drunkard from the San Giacomo valley was driving along the road to Madonna dei Boschi, where the Bisalta, rising in all its height, covered the moon and thus obscured his way. The man, cursing, said he would give his soul to the devil to see the mountain disappear. Suddenly, a tall man dressed in green appeared, with a brown face and frizzy stubble. He was the devil, who offered him a paper contract: he would clear the view of the moon by the next morning in exchange for his soul, surrendered after six years. But the drunken man did not know how to sign, so the devil gave him a needle and ordered him to make a mark with his blood. Once the contract was signed, many devils and little devils appeared and began to dig the mountain from the top. The devil feared he would not be able to fulfill the pact, as the work proved more difficult than expected: shortly after midnight, they had only nicked part of the summit, splitting it in two. While looking for a loophole in the contract, all the devils and little devils disappeared. The contract had been signed with a cross. From then on, the summit of the Bisalta was doubled.

The Bisalta was frequented in the late 19th century by famous mountaineers such as Freshfield and Coolidge, who greatly appreciated the views from its summit. Because of its isolated location, the Bisalta massif tends to attract lightning. This caused a tragedy in July 1960 in which four people attending a religious ceremony lost their lives and were killed by lightning discharged on the summit cross of Bric Costa Rossa.

In the 1950s, uranium research was carried out and supervised, among others, by geologist Felice Ippolito. In the course of such research, six of the workers who worked in the tunnels dedicated to geological prospecting lost their lives, and others fell ill with silicosis, as writer Nuto Revelli recalls in his book Il mondo dei vinti.

== Access to the summit ==
The Bisalta can be reached by traversing, by traces of passage over scree, the Costa del Mula; a longer route starts instead from San Giacomo in Val Colla. A third route runs along the southern ridge and connects the mountain with the Bric Costa Rossa, which in turn can be reached from Limone Piemonte.

The mountain is also accessible by snowshoeing or ski touring.

== Gallery ==
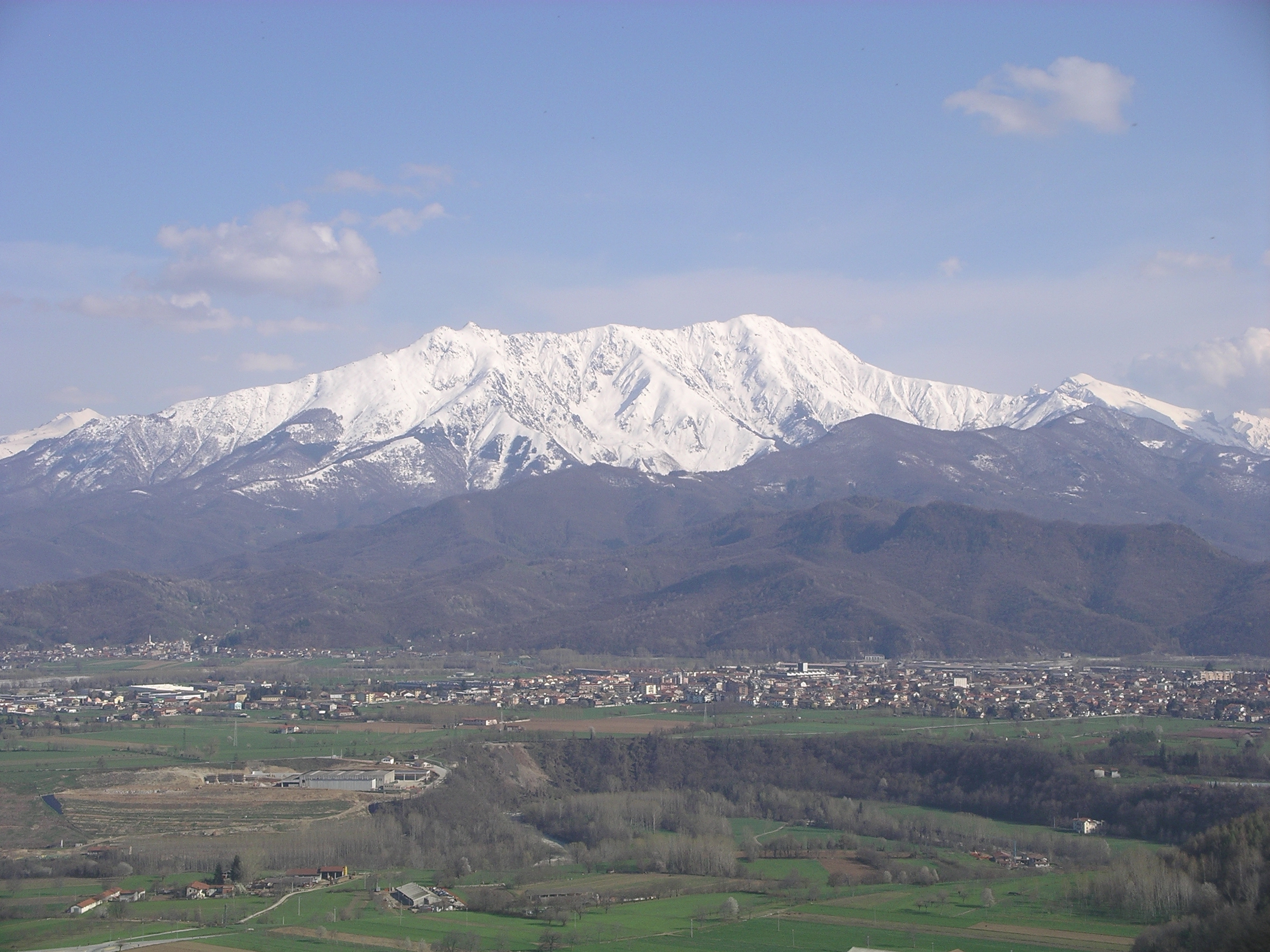
The Bisalta from San Maurizio Pass, Cervasca (CN)

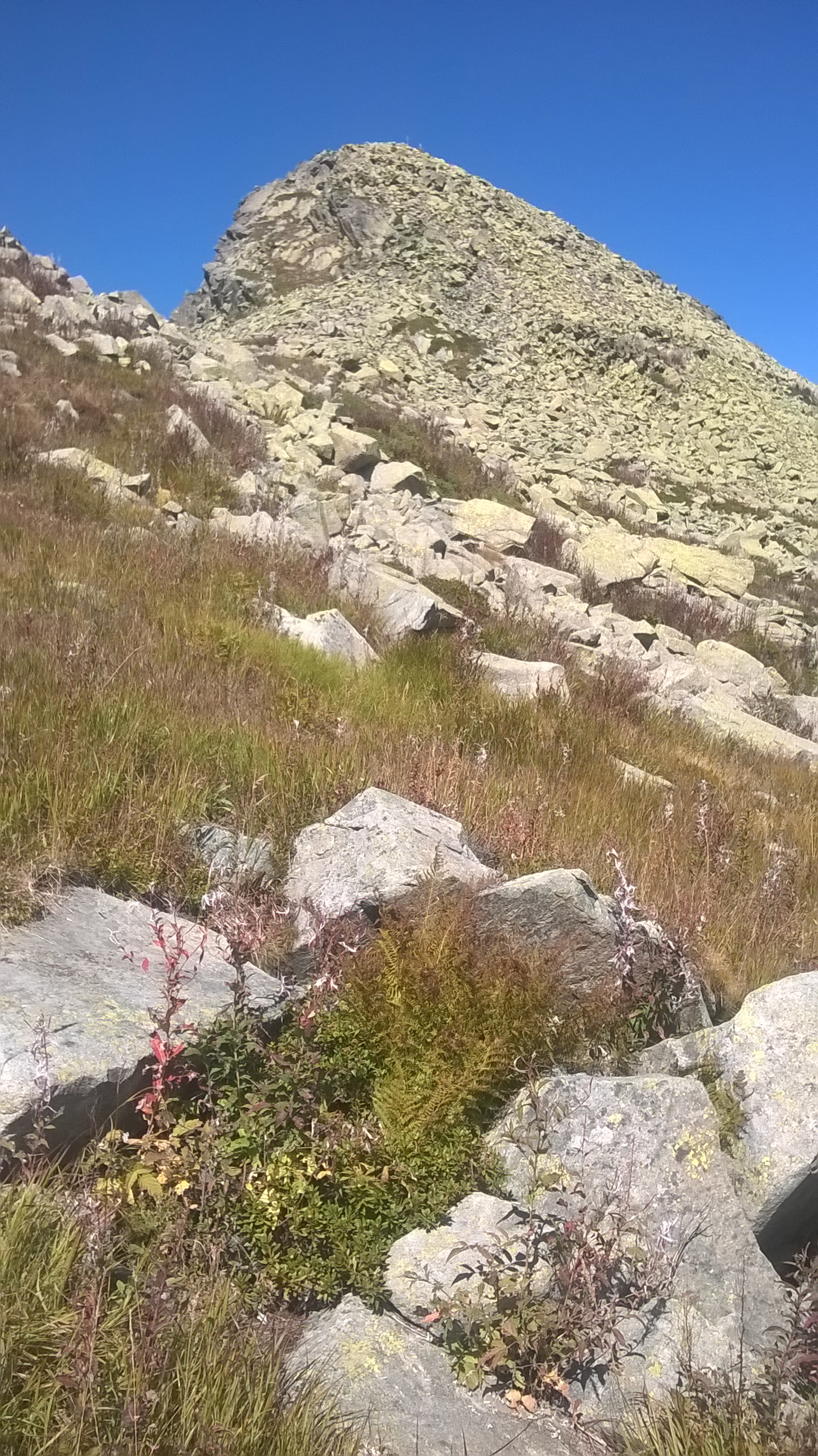
The rocky summit of Mount Besimauda

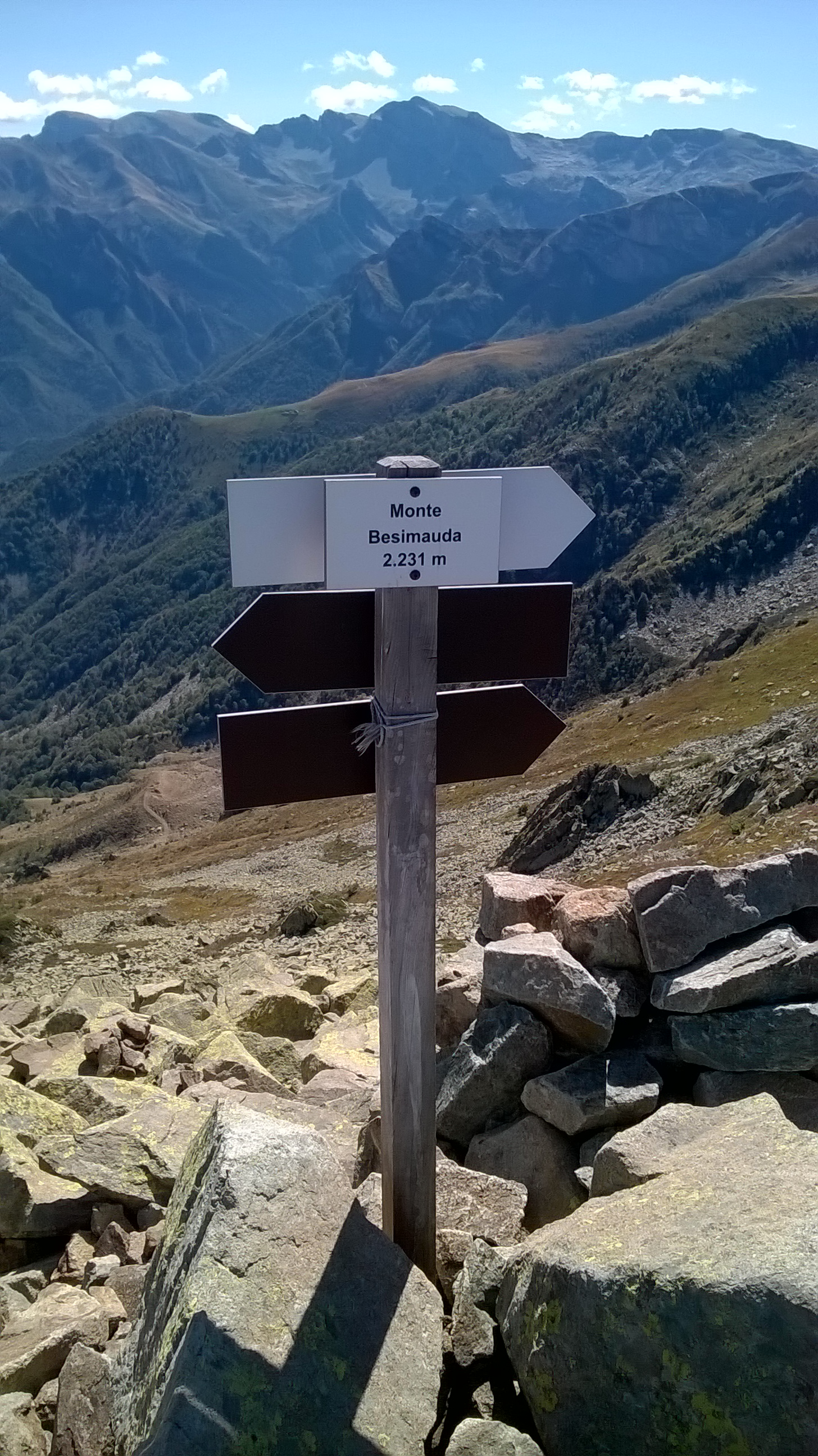
Panorama from the summit of Mount Besimauda

== See also ==
- Istituto Geografico Militare
- Istituto Geografico Centrale

== Bibliography ==
- Cartografia ufficiale italiana in scala 1:25.000 e 1:100.000 [Official Italian cartography at scales 1:25,000 and 1:100,000] (in Italian). Istituto Geografico Militare.
- Carta dei sentieri e stradale scala 1:25.000 n. 16 Val Vermenagna Valle Pesio Alta val Ellero Parco naturale del Marguareis [Trail and road map scale 1:25,000 No. 16 Val Vermenagna Valle Pesio Alta val Ellero Marguareis Nature Park] (in Italian). Ciriè: Fraternali editore.
- Carta in scala 1:50.000 n. 8 Alpi Marittime e Liguri [1:50,000 scale map no. 8 Maritime and Ligurian Alps] (in Italian). Torino: Istituto Geografico Centrale.
