= Werner Grothmann =

German army commander (1915–2002)

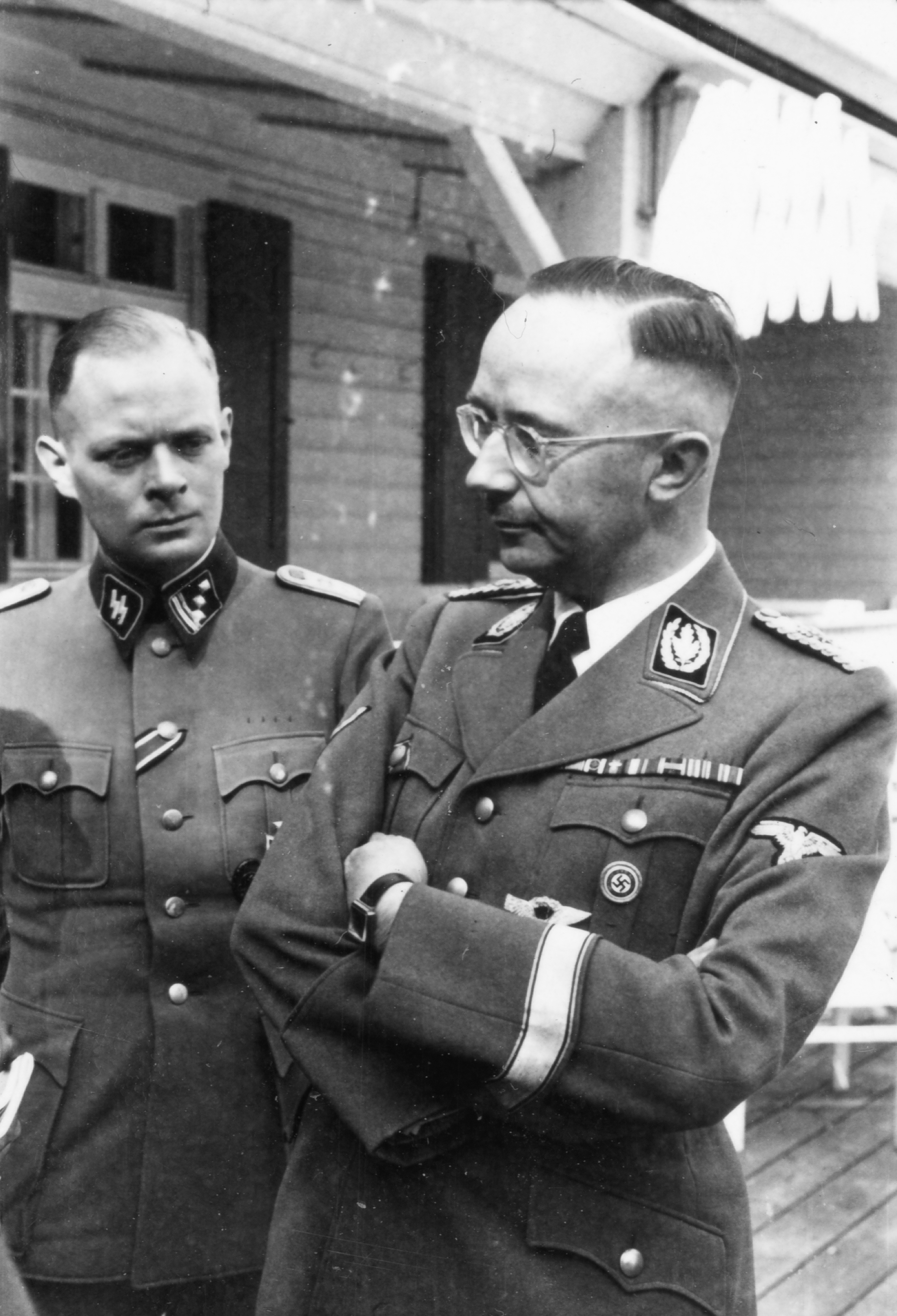
- Werner Grothmann (left) next to Heinrich Himmler in 1943
- Born: 23 August 1915; Frankfurt am Main, German Empire
- Died: 26 February 2002 (aged 86)
- Military career
- Allegiance: Nazi Germany
- Branch: Schutzstaffel
- Service years: 1933–45
- Rank: Obersturmbannführer
- Commands: SS-Sturmbann Nº 13

Werner Grothmann (23 August 1915 – 26 February 2002) was a mid-ranking commander in the Waffen-SS of Nazi Germany and aide-de-camp to the head of the SS, Heinrich Himmler, from 1940 until Himmler's death in 1945.

== Biography ==
Grothmann was born in Frankfurt am Main in 1915. In his youth he studied economics and carved out a career as an accountant at a bank. In 1933 he joined the SS at 18 years old, and was trained at a Junkerschule SS. At the beginning of the Second World War, he was given command of SS-Sturmbann Nº 13, a unit of the SS Standarte Deutschland. He took part in the Battle of France and was wounded in combat in June 1940. At the suggestion of Joachim Peiper, Grothmann was appointed second assistant to Heinrich Himmler until July 1942, when he was promoted to aide-de-camp to Himmler. As Himmler's aide, Grothmann accompanied him on all field visits.

In November 1942, Grothmann helped organize Operation Harvest Festival, the largest single massacre of Jews by German forces during the Holocaust. After a series of Jewish uprisings in ghettos and extermination camps, Himmler ordered the murder of the remaining Jewish forced laborers in the Lublin District of German-occupied Poland. The leadership of the Lipowa 7 camp in Lublin, which held Jewish prisoners of war, queried Himmler as to whether they should violate the Geneva Convention by allowing the prisoners to be executed. Grothmann replied that "all Jews without exception are subject to liquidation".

During the last few days of the war in Europe, Himmler, Grothmann and Heinz Macher traveled from Lübeck to Flensburg, where Himmler offered his services as second-in-command to the Flensburg government led by Karl Dönitz, successor to Adolf Hitler. Dönitz repeatedly rejected Himmler's overtures and initiated peace negotiations with the Allies. Himmler was formally dismissed from all his posts.

Unwanted by his former colleagues and hunted by the Allies, Himmler attempted to go into hiding. Himmler had not made extensive preparations for this, but he had equipped himself with a forged paybook under the name of Sergeant Heinrich Hitzinger of the Geheime Feldpolizei (Secret Field Police), which was a mistake since members of this organization were sought after by the occupation forces. Grothmann and Macher were both dressed as army privates. Grothmann, Himmler, and Macher were stopped at a checkpoint, which had been set up by former Soviet POWs, on 21 May and detained. The three men were taken to an Allied barracks in Lüneburg on 23 May. During a routine interrogation, Himmler admitted who he was, and was then taken to the headquarters of the Second British Army. During an attempted medical examination, Himmler bit into a hidden cyanide pill and died. After Himmler's suicide, Grothmann and Macher were arrested.

Grothmann was taken to a barracks at Lübeck, where he was extensively questioned. He denied any knowledge of Operation Reinhard. Then he was taken to an SS prison camp. Grothmann served as a prosecution witness against several SS officials between 1946 and 1948, but during the trial of Karl Wolff he denied having any knowledge of the Final Solution. A claim contradicted by his documented comments in relation to Operation Harvest Festival. After release from Allied internment, Grothmann was denazified, considered part of category III (Lesser Offenders), by a court in Freising in March 1949.

Grothmann remade his life as a businessman and granted a few interviews in the 1970s in which he disparaged Himmler's character. He also gave a eulogy at the funeral of Richard Schulze-Kossens. Grothmann died in 2002.
