= Hal D. McCown =

United States Army officer

Hal Dale McCown
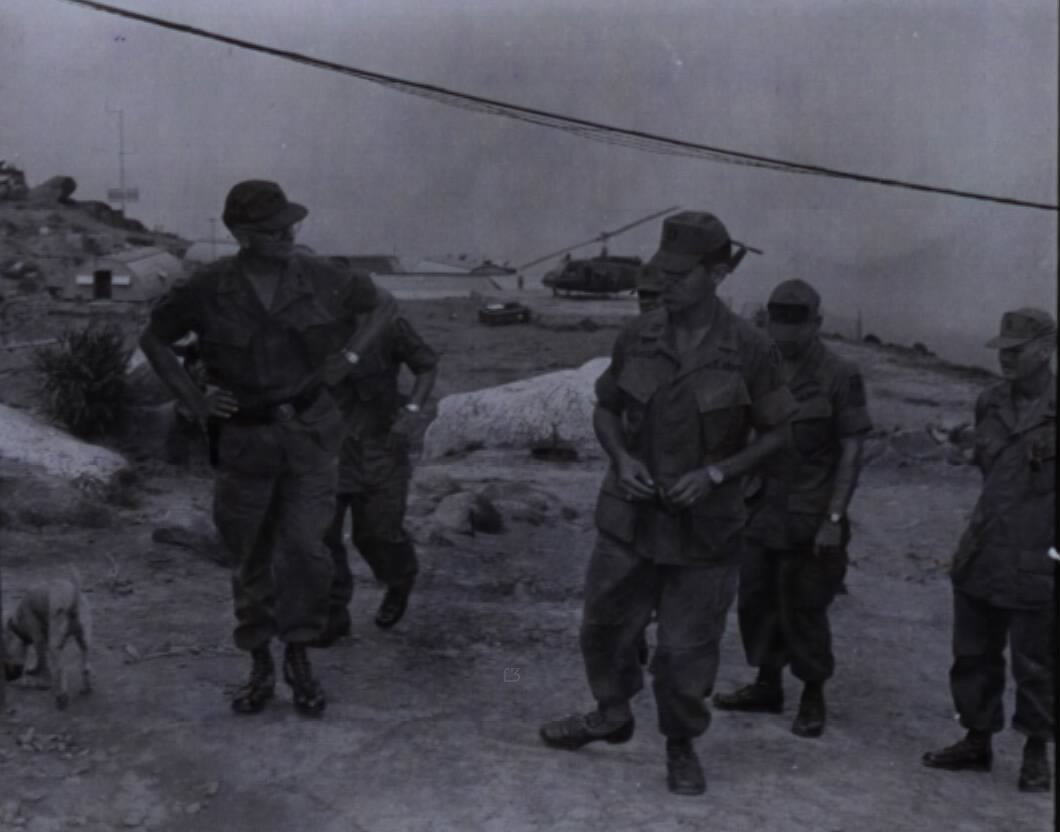
- McCown (left) on an inspection of the Nui Chua Chan signal facilities, 24 October 1969
- Born: 26 November 1916
- Died: 6 July 1999 (aged 82)
- Burial place: Little Rock National Cemetery
- Military career
- Branch: United States Army
- Service years: 1940–1972
- Rank: Major general
- Conflicts: World War II; Korean War; Vietnam War
- Awards: Distinguished Service Medal; Silver Star (3); Purple Heart

Major General Hal Dale McCown (26 November 1916 – 6 July 1999) was a United States Army officer who served in World War II, the Korean War and the Vietnam War.

== Early life ==
McCown was born on 29 November 1916. He later attended Louisiana State University.

== Military career ==
During World War II he served as commander of the 2nd Battalion, 119th Infantry Regiment. During the Battle of the Bulge, McCown was captured by Joachim Peiper’s Kampfgruppe on 21 December. As Peiper’s unit was surrounded at La Gleize, Peiper negotiated with McCown to release the U.S. prisoners and eventually the prisoners were released when Peiper’s men fled on foot towards German lines. McCown later testified at Peiper’s 1946 war crimes trial that he had not seen any American prisoners mistreated by the SS.

During the Korean War he served in the 7th Infantry Division commanding the 17th Infantry Regiment from June 1951.

During the Vietnam War he first served in South Vietnam as IV Corps adviser from 1962 to August 1963 and commanded John Paul Vann. At the end of his advisory tour McCown overoptimistically reported that "during 1963 the posture of the VC Vietcong has clearly deteriorated in IV CTZ… we are winning clearly, steadily and, as far as I can see, inexorably."

He served as commander of U.S. Military Assistance Command, Thailand from June 1967 to 1969 and was instrumental in organising the deployment of the Royal Thai Volunteer Regiment to South Vietnam and the later deployment of the Royal Thai Army Expeditionary Division.

He served as chief of staff of II Field Force, Vietnam and then as senior adviser, Delta Regional Assistance Command from January 1970 to April 1971.

McCown retired from the Army in 1972 as a Major General.

== Later life ==
McCown died on 6 July 1999 and is buried at Little Rock National Cemetery.

== Decorations ==
His decorations included the Distinguished Service Medal, Silver Star (3) and the Purple Heart.
