= Heinz Macher =

German SS officer and Nazi official (1919–2001)

- Heinz Macher
- Born: 31 December 1919; Chemnitz, German Empire
- Died: 21 December 2001 (aged 81); Schenefeld, Pinneberg, Germany
- Military career
- Allegiance: Nazi Germany
- Branch: Schutzstaffel
- Rank: Sturmbannführer
- Conflicts: World War II
- Awards: Knight's Cross of the Iron Cross with Oak Leaves

Heinz Macher (31 December 1919 – 21 December 2001) was a mid-ranking Waffen-SS member and Nazi official during the Second World War. He served as the second personal assistant to Reichsführer-SS Heinrich Himmler.

== Career ==
Macher was born in the town of Chemnitz in 1919. He joined the SS in 1940 and was attached to the SS Regiment "Deutschland". In 1943, he received the Knight's Cross of the Iron Cross for valor in combat on the Eastern Front. In 1944, he was awarded the Knight's Cross of the Iron Cross with Oak Leaves and promoted to Sturmbannführer.

Macher was appointed the second assistant to Heinrich Himmler in 1944, followed by Werner Grothmann. In 1945, Macher led a group of 15 SS specialists who were ordered by Himmler to blow up the SS castle Wewelsburg near Paderborn in order to ensure that the devotional objects and important files should not fall into the hands of the Allies. The demolition command arrived on 31 March 1945. The same day, after Macher had informed the local fire brigade, the south-east tower, the least important tower of the large castle, was blown up. Because of lack of explosives they could not blow up the rest of the complex. Macher ordered the firemen not to extinguish the fire so that most of the complex was nevertheless destroyed. Macher was also charged with the task of burying the castle's treasures, including over 9,000 Death's Head rings held in a shrine to commemorate SS men killed in action. These treasures have never been found.

During the last few days of the war, Himmler, Macher and Grothmann traveled from Lübeck to Flensburg, where Himmler offered his services as second-in-command to the new interim government led by Karl Dönitz, who had been appointed a successor to Adolf Hitler. Dönitz repeatedly rejected Himmler's overtures and initiated peace negotiations with the Allies.

Dismissed from his posts and unwanted by his former colleagues, Himmler attempted to go into hiding in order to avoid capture. Himmler equipped himself with a forged paybook under the name of Sergeant Heinrich Hitzinger of the Geheime Feldpolizei (Secret Field Police), which was a mistake since members of this organization were sought after by the liberation forces. Macher and Grothmann were both dressed as army privates. Macher, Himmler and Grothmann were stopped at a checkpoint, which had been set up by former Soviet POWs, on 21 May and detained. The three men were taken to an Allied barracks in Lüneburg on 23 May. During a routine interrogation, Himmler admitted who he was; thereafter, at the headquarters of the Second British Army, during an attempted medical examination Himmler bit into a hidden cyanide pill and died. After Himmler's suicide, Macher and Grothmann were arrested.

Macher appeared publicly in April 1966, along with other former SS officers, at the funeral of Josef Dietrich, displaying the medals of the late SS leader. He died on 21 December 2001 in Schenefeld, Pinneberg.

== Awards ==
- Iron Cross (1939) 2nd Class (24 September 1941) & 1st Class (25 March 1942)
- German Cross in Gold on 7 August 1944 as SS-Obersturmführer in the 16.(Pi.)/SS-Panzergrenadier-Regiment 3 "Deutschland"
- Knight's Cross of the Iron Cross with Oak Leaves
  - Knight's Cross on 3 April 1943 as SS-Untersturmführer and leader of the 16.(Pi.)/SS-Panzergrenadier-Regiment "Deutschland"
  - 554th Oak Leaves on 19 August 1944 as SS-Obersturmführer and chief of the 16.(Pi.)/SS-Panzergrenadier-Regiment 3 "Deutschland"
