= Boves massacre =

World War II war crime

- Part of the Italian campaign
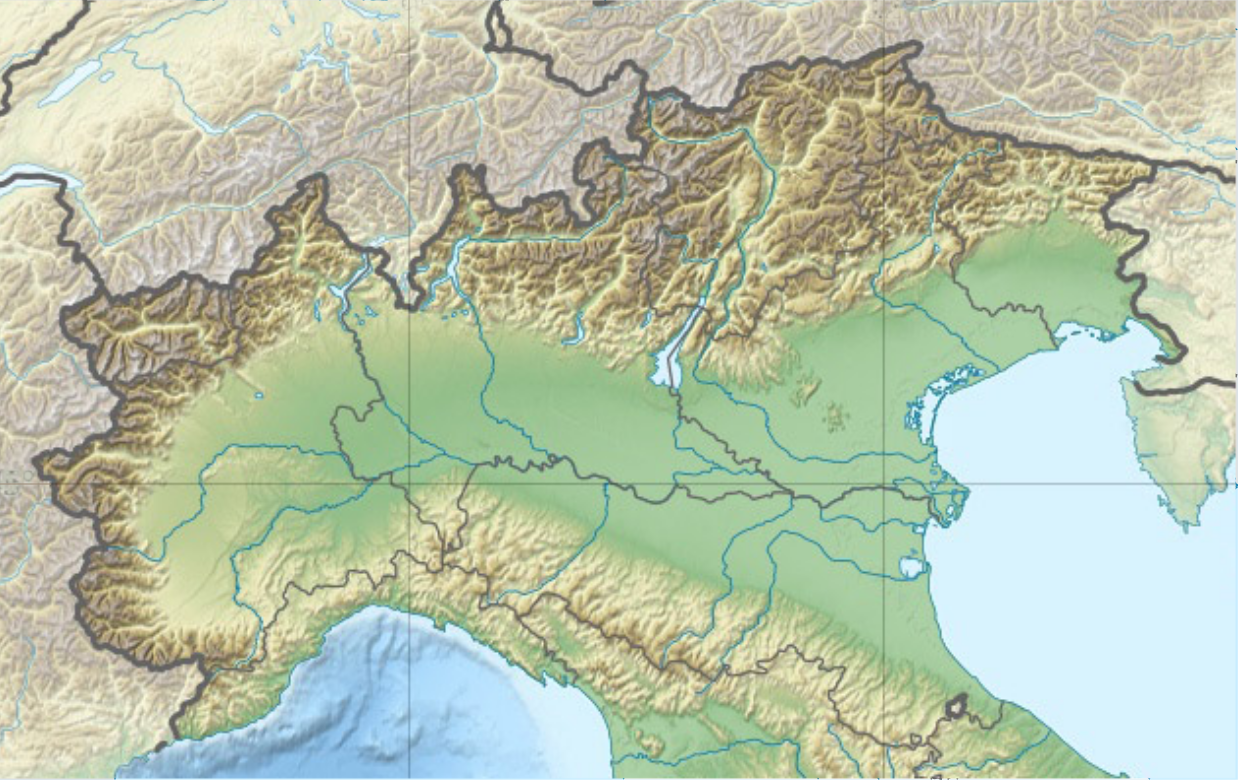
- Boves massacre (Northern Italy)
- Location: 44°20′N 7°33′E; Boves, Piedmont, Italy
- Date: 19 September 1943
- Target: Italian civilians
- Attack type: Massacre
- Deaths: 23
- Injuries: 22
- Perpetrator: Soldiers from the 1st SS Panzer Division under the command of Joachim Peiper
- Motive: Reprisal for the capture of German soldiers by partisans

The Boves massacre (Italian: Eccidio di Boves) was a World War II war crime that took place on 19 September 1943 in the comune of Boves, Italy. The event took place following the Italian surrender on 8 September 1943. Twenty-three Italian civilians were killed and several hundred houses were destroyed by artillery fire of the Waffen-SS under the command of Joachim Peiper. The massacre and destruction were reprisals for one German soldier having been killed and two German NCOs having been captured and held by Italian partisans in the vicinity of the town. After obtaining their release, Peiper ordered the destruction of the town, despite earlier promising not to do so.

The Boves massacre is sometimes referred to as the first German World War II massacre on civilians in Italy, but this is incorrect as German massacres were already carried out from July 1943, during the Allied invasion of Sicily.

== Prelude ==
Following the Italian surrender on 8 September 1943 the region around Boves, near the French border, saw Italian soldiers pass through on their return to Italy. German authorities were worried that these soldiers might join local partisans and encouraged them to either report to local authorities or disband. The 1st SS Panzer Division Leibstandarte SS Adolf Hitler was stationed in the area to take control of the border region, and, while neither instructed nor authorised to carry out arrests and executions of Jews, participated in both on its own accord immediately after the Italian surrender. The division at the time also looted Jewish property and had to be explicitly stopped by SS corps commander Paul Hausser on the grounds that only the security police and the SD were authorised to carry out those measures. The Leibstandarte engaged in hunting down Jews, Peiper's own unit was pursuing approximately 1,000 Jews who had fled from the former Italian occupation zone in France, while further north another unit of the division killed 54 Jewish civilians at Lago Maggiore and submerged their bodies in the lake. Unlike these, however, the massacre at Boves did not target Jews.

== Massacre ==
Versions of the subsequent events at Boves and the massacre vary between Italian and German testimonies and even between official German records and statements made by soldiers of the Leibstandarte. The differentiation between partisans, returning Italian soldiers and those that joined the partisans at this point was somewhat blurred.

Eleven days after the surrender, on 19 September 1943, two German NCOs were captured by a combined force of partisans and Italian Army soldiers under the command of former GAF officer Ignazio Vian. An attempt to free the German prisoners by a company of the Leibstandarte failed, resulting in one dead on each side and a number of German soldiers wounded. Subsequent to this, Peiper and his unit were called in to free the German soldiers and took up positions in Boves, controlled access to the town and threatened to destroy the town and its inhabitants should their demands not be met. Peiper committed to sparing the town if the German soldiers were freed.

The parish priest of Boves, Giuseppe Bernardi, and local industrialist Antonio Vassallo, who had acted as negotiators between Peiper and the Italian soldiers and partisans, successfully secured the release of the prisoners and the return of the body of the killed German soldier, but Bernardi and Vassallo were later doused with petrol and burned alive.

Despite promises to the contrary, Pieper ordered his men to open fire on the village of Boves (according to German sources; Italian sources instead say that the soldiers had entered the village and set fire to the houses of its inhabitants), already having taken up positions beforehand to allow such an action, killing 23 civilians and destroying 350 houses in Boves and surrounding communities. The victims consisted predominantly of old, sick or infirm civilians, as most others had left Boves before the massacre to hide out. Among the victims, Bartolomeo Ghinamo, a deaf-mute living in Via Vigne, was gunned down when he tried to put out the fire after Peiper's men had set his house alight; Francesco Dalmasso, a disabled veteran, was shot dead while trying to escape through the fields; Caterina Bo, an 86-year-old woman who could not move from her bed, was burned alive when Peiper's men set fire to her house. The deputy parish priest, don Mario Ghibaudo, was killed while giving the absolution to an old man who had been shot by a German soldier. Adriana Masino, an inhabitant of Boves, testified to Colonel Chiorando on 12 January 1968 (during Peiper’s trial) that she and her brother Giacomo were dragging a cart through a street, when they met two Germans; they raised their hands, and Giacomo moved towards them saying that he could speak two languages. One of the two soldiers made a gesture to the other, and Giacomo Masino was shot dead on the spot. Michel and Piero Sopra, when testifying to the military chaplain Luigi Feltrin for the identification of Don Mario Ghibaudo’s body, stated that they too were fleeing from the village when they met some German soldiers; one of them shot Michele Agnese, their grandfather, in the head. Don Ghibaudo gave Agnese the absolution, and was shot dead in turn. This happened around 18:00 in Via Badina. Giacomo Dalmasso, a 29-year-old cart driver, was shot multiple times but survived after 93 days in hospital, as the bullets did not hit any vital organs.

Peiper defended the killing of civilians as collateral damage in a war action, but there were no partisans in Boves, they were on the surrounding mountains where the German troops did not pursue them.

One possible explanation for the brutality of the massacre is that Peiper wanted to discourage straggling Italian soldiers, many of whom were at this point unsure about their next steps, from joining the local partisans.

== Subsequent events ==
The region around Boves remained a hotspot for partisan activities and German reprisals which saw local villages devastated. Between 31 December 1943 and 3 January 1944 a further 59 civilians and partisans were killed in the region in another massacre.

== Trial ==
The attempts by plaintiffs to bring about the conviction of Joachim Peiper, Lieutenant's Otto Heinrich Dinse and Erhard Gührs for action at Boves, occurred 25 years after 1943. In 1968, an Italian court concluded there was "...insufficient suspicion of criminal activity on the part of any of the accused to warrant prosecution". On 28 December 1968, a German District Court in Stuttgart reached the same conclusion, terminating any potential prosecution of Peiper for his activities in Italy.

== Commemoration ==
After Peiper's death in France in 1976 he was buried in Schondorf, Bavaria. Initially disturbed by the fact that the town was home to such a controversial figure a small group of local citizens decided to hold a prayer for the victims of Boves on the 19th of every month. The main square in front of another church in town was renamed Piazza dell’Olmo, after a similar square in Boves. In 2013 a group of citizens from Boves visited Schondorf to pray at Peiper's grave.
