= Joachim Peiper =

SS officer and war criminal (1915–1976)

- Lt. Col. Peiper, in custody after surrendering to the U.S. military, May 1945
- Born: Joachim Sigismund Albrecht Klaus Arwed Detlef Peiper; 30 January 1915; Wilmersdorf, German Empire
- Died: 14 July 1976 (aged 61); Traves, Haute-Saône, France
- Cause of death: Assassination (arson by French communists)
- Resting place: Schondorf, Bavaria, Germany
- Political party: Nazi Party
- Conviction: War crimes
- Trial: Malmedy massacre trial
- Penalty: Death; commuted to life imprisonment; further commuted to 35 years imprisonment
- SS career
- Allegiance: Nazi Germany
- Branch: Schutzstaffel (SS-Verfügungstruppe)
- Service years: 1934–1945
- Rank: SS-Standartenführer
- Service number: SS #132,496
- Units: Personal Staff Reichsführer-SS (as adjutant to Heinrich Himmler): SS Division Leibstandarte; Kampfgruppe Peiper
- Conflicts: World War II; Eastern Front; Third Battle of Kharkov; Battle of Kursk; Operation Achse; Boves massacre; Battle of the Bulge; Malmedy massacre; Eastern Front (1945); Operation Southwind; Operation Spring Awakening
- Awards: Knight's Cross of the Iron Cross with Oak Leaves
- Other work: Car salesman for Porsche; manager for Volkswagen

Joachim "Jochen" Peiper (30 January 1915 – 14 July 1976) was a German battalion commander in the Waffen-SS. He was a Nazi war criminal found guilty of the Malmedy massacre of U.S. Army prisoners of war. During the Second World War in Europe, Peiper served as personal adjutant to Heinrich Himmler, leader of the SS, and as a tank commander in the Waffen-SS. Peiper fought in the Third Battle of Kharkov and in the Battle of the Bulge, from which battles his eponymous battle group—Kampfgruppe Peiper—became notorious for committing war crimes against civilians and POWs.

As adjutant to Himmler, Peiper witnessed the SS implement the Holocaust with the genocide of Jews in Eastern Europe, facts that he obfuscated and denied in the post–War period. As a tank commander, Peiper served in the 1st SS Panzer Division Leibstandarte SS Adolf Hitler on the Eastern Front and on the Western Front, first as a battalion commander and then as a regimental commander. In the Malmedy Massacre Trial, the US military tribunal established Peiper's command responsibility for the Malmedy massacre (1944) and sentenced him to death, a sentence later commuted to life in prison, then 35 years. In Italy, Peiper was accused of having committed the Boves massacre (1943); that investigation ended for lack of war-crime evidence that Peiper ordered the summary killing of Italian civilians.

Upon release from prison, Peiper worked for the Porsche and Volkswagen automobile companies and later moved to France, where he worked as a freelance translator. Throughout his post-war life, Peiper was active in the network of ex–SS men, including the right-wing political group HIAG (Mutual Aid Association of Former Waffen-SS Members). In 1976, Peiper was murdered in France when his house was set afire after the publication of his identity as a war criminal.

Despite having been only a minor combat leader, Peiper's idolization by fans of the Second World War who romanticise the Waffen-SS in popular culture developed a cult of personality that views Peiper as a war hero of Germany. According to the historian Jens Westemeier, Peiper personified Nazi ideology as a ruthless glory-hound commander who was indifferent to the combat casualties of Battle Group Peiper, and who encouraged, expected, and tolerated war crimes by his troops.

== Early life ==
Joachim Sigismund Albrecht Klaus Arwed Detlef Peiper was born on 30 January 1915 in Wilmersdorf, a district of Berlin, part of the German Empire. He was the third son of a middle-class family from German Silesia.

His father, Woldemar Peiper, had served as an officer in the Imperial German Army and fought in the 1904 campaign in German South West Africa. He later contracted malaria and received a severe wound which demobilised him from active duty in German Africa. In 1907, Woldemar resumed active duty in the Prussian army. He served again in the First World War and was for a time deployed to Ottoman Turkey, where he suffered chronic cardiac problems consequent to the previous malarial infection. Poor health then demobilised Woldemar from active duty in Asia Minor.

During the European interwar period, Woldemar joined the paramilitary Freikorps and actively participated in suppressing the Polish Silesian Uprisings (August 1919 – July 1921) which aimed to annex German Silesia to the Second Polish Republic. In the Weimar Germany of the 1920s, the antisemitic canards of Nazi ideology—the Stab-in-the-back myth, the Protocols of the Elders of Zion, The International Jew, et cetera—had much appeal to the political conservatives and to the political reactionaries such as Freikorps soldier Woldemar Peiper who were angry that Imperial Germany had lost the Great War.

Two of Woldemar's sons, Horst and Joachim, followed the same life path of nationalist ideology and military service to Germany. In 1926, the 11-year-old Joachim followed his middle brother, 14-year-old Horst Peiper, to become a boy scout; eventually, Joachim became interested in becoming a military officer.

Horst joined the Schutzstaffel (SS) and served in the SS-Totenkopfverbände as a guard in a Nazi concentration camp. Transferred to combat duty in the Waffen-SS, Horst fought in the Battle of France (1940) as part of the 3rd SS Panzer Division, and died in Poland in June 1941 in a never-fully-explained accident; rumour said that his fellow SS-men drove Horst to commit suicide because of his homosexuality.

Peiper's eldest brother, Hans-Hasso (b. 1910) had a mental illness, and his suicide attempt resulted in cerebral damage that reduced him to a persistent vegetative state. Interned to a hospital in 1931, Hans died of tuberculosis in 1942.

== Pre-War Germany ==
=== SS career ===
Joachim Peiper was 18 years old when he joined the Hitler Youth in the company of Horst, his middle brother. In October 1933, Peiper volunteered for the Schutzstaffel (SS) and joined the Cavalry SS, where his first superior officer was Gustav Lombard, a zealous Nazi, and later a regimental commander in the SS Cavalry Brigade, who were notoriously efficient at the mass murder of Jews in the occupied Soviet Union, notably in punitive operations such as the Pripyat Marshes massacres (July–August 1941) in Byelorussia.

On 23 January 1934, he was promoted to SS-Mann (SS Identity Card Nr. 132.496), which made Peiper an "SS Man" before the Schutzstaffel was independent of the Sturmabteilung (SA) within the Nazi Party. Later that year, Peiper was promoted to SS-Sturmmann at the 1934 Nuremberg Rally, where his reputation attracted the notice of Reichsführer-SS Heinrich Himmler, for whom Peiper personified Aryanism, the master-race concept promoted by the Nazism taught at the SS officer school. Despite not being as tall, blond, and muscular as the Nordic recruits to the SS, Peiper compensated by being a handsome, personable, and self-confident SS officer.

The SS formally employed Peiper in January 1935, and later sent him to a military leadership course. As an SS leadership student, Peiper received favourable and approving reviews from the SS instructors, yet received only conditional approval from the military psychologists, who noted Peiper's egocentricity, negative attitude, and continual attempts to impress them with his personal connection to Reichsführer-SS Himmler. The military psychologists concluded that Peiper might become either a "difficult subordinate" or an "arrogant superior" in the course of his career in the SS.

In the April 1935 – March 1936 period, Peiper trained as a military officer in the SS-Junker School, from which institution the director, Paul Hausser, graduated ideologically complicit Nazi leaders for the Waffen-SS. Besides military fieldcraft, the SS-Junker School taught the Nazi worldview that centred upon anti-Semitism.

The Nazi Party issued Peiper his NSDAP Identity Card Nr. 5.508.134 on 1 March 1938, two years after he became an SS man. In the post-war period, Peiper continually denied having been a member of the Nazi Party, because that fact contradicted his self-promoted image of a common man who was "merely a soldier" in the Second World War.

=== Himmler's adjutant ===
In June 1938, Peiper became an adjutant to Reichsführer-SS Himmler, which tour of duty Himmler considered necessary administrative training for a promotable SS leader. In that time, the officers working within the Personal Staff Reichsführer-SS were under the command of SS functionary Karl Wolff. As a staff officer, Peiper worked in the anteroom of the SS Main Office in Berlin and became a favourite adjutant of Himmler. Peiper returned the admiration and by 1939, Peiper always was the adjutant of the Reichsführer-SS at every official function.

== Invasion of Poland, 1939 ==
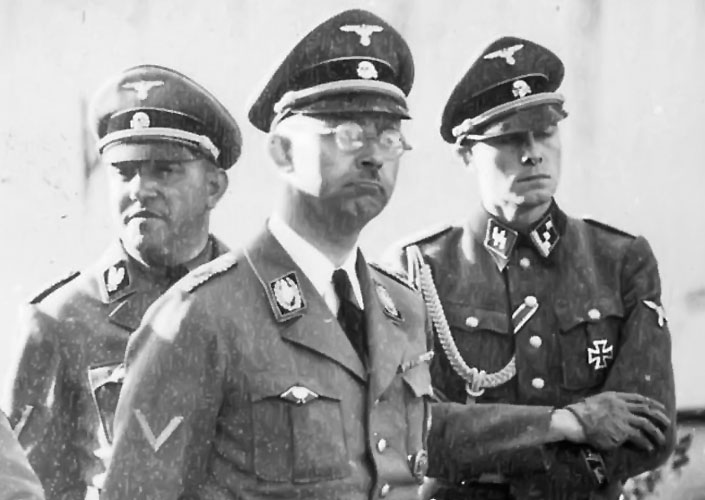
The senior officers of the SS inspecting Nazi-occupied France: (left-right) SS General Sepp Dietrich, Reichsführer-SS Heinrich Himmler, and his adjutant, Joachim Peiper, at Metz, in September 1940.

On 1 September 1939, Nazi Germany's invasion of Poland started the Second World War in Europe. Adjutant Peiper travelled in the personal train of Reichsführer-SS Himmler. Peiper occasionally was the liaison officer to Hitler, when the Führer travelled by train with Erwin Rommel, and when the Führer met with Wehrmacht and Waffen-SS generals near the front lines of the Eastern Front.

On 20 September, in the northern Polish city of Bydgoszcz, Himmler and Peiper witnessed the public executions of twenty Polish social leaders who might lead partisan resistance to Nazi occupation. That demonstration of the mechanics of the Holocaust—of ethnic cleansing—was realised by the paramilitary Volksdeutscher Selbstschutz, an ethnic-German, self-defence militia commanded by Ludolf von Alvensleben, the local SS and Police leader. In later conversation with the explorer Ernst Schäfer, Peiper rationalised the actions of the SS to hunt and kill the Polish intelligentsia by ascribing sole command responsibility to Hitler and his superior orders to Himmler.

As a participant in the Nazi conquest of Poland for German Lebensraum, Peiper witnessed the administrative refinement of SS policies for more effective methods of killing during ethnic cleansing, designed to depopulate Polish lands for German colonists. On 13 December 1939, in west-central Poland, at the village of Owińska, near Poznań, Himmler and Peiper witnessed the Aktion T4 poison-gas mass killing of mentally ill patients in a psychiatric hospital. In post-war interrogations by US Army JAG and military intelligence interrogators, Peiper was factual and emotionally detached in describing his eye-witness experience of mass murder:

The [gassing] action was done before a circle of invited guests ... The insane were led into a prepared casemate, the door of which had a Plexiglas window. After the door was closed, one could see how, in the beginning, the insane still laughed and talked to each other. But, soon they sat down on the straw, obviously under the influence of the gas ... Very soon, they no longer moved.

Throughout 1940, Himmler and Peiper made an inspection tour of the concentration camps of Nazi Germany, including the Neuengamme concentration camp in the north, and the Sachsenhausen concentration camp in the north-east of the country. In Occupied Poland, Himmler met with Friedrich-Wilhelm Krüger, the Higher SS and Police Leader, and his subordinate, Odilo Globocnik, the SS bureaucrat responsible for deporting the Jews from the cities of Warsaw and Lublin and from the Polish territories already annexed as Lebensraum for Germany.

In April 1940, Himmler and Peiper continued their camp inspection tour at the Buchenwald concentration camp and the Flossenbürg concentration camp. The SS and Police Leader Wilhelm Rediess and the SS official Otto Rasch strove to develop quicker methods for killing civilians in order to depopulate Poland for German colonisation. In May 1940, Globocnik demonstrated for Himmler and Peiper the efficacy of the Aktion T4 programme for the involuntary euthanasia of disabled and crippled people and also discussed Globocnik's work in the Lublin Reservation programme for the control and confinement of the Jewish populations of the Greater Germanic Reich.

== Battle of France, 1940 ==
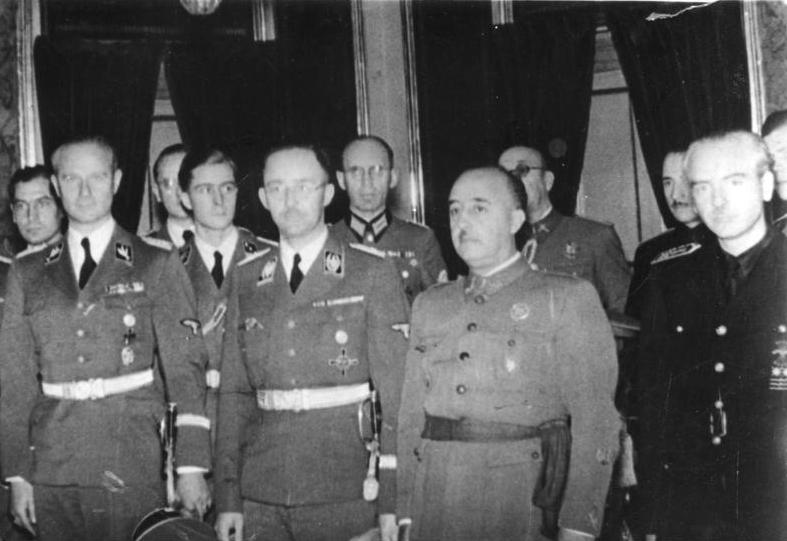
The Spanish Head of State, Generalíssimo Francisco Franco, is host to the Third Reich officials Karl Wolff (lt.), Joachim Peiper (ctr.), and Reichsführer-SS Heinrich Himmler (rt.) in October 1940.

In May 1940, Himmler and Peiper followed the Waffen-SS throughout the Battle of France. On 18 May, Peiper became a platoon leader in a unit of the LSSAH motorised regiment. For audacious soldiering in his platoon's capture of a French artillery battery atop the hills of Wattenberg, south of Valenciennes, Peiper was awarded the Iron Cross 2nd class, and promoted to SS-Hauptsturmführer (captain). On 19 June 1940, Peiper was awarded the Iron Cross 1st class for audacious soldiering. As a further reward and remuneration, Peiper took back to Germany a French sports car for his personal use; Himmler ordered the car be included in the motor-pool inventory of his personal staff. On 21 June 1940, Peiper returned to his role of personal adjutant to Himmler.

On 7 September 1940, Himmler thanked the commanders of the LSSAH motorised regiment: "We had to have the toughness—this should be said and soon forgotten—to shoot thousands of leading Poles", and stressed the psychological problems suffered by Waffen-SS soldiers when they are "carrying out executions", "hauling away people", and "evicting crying and hysterical women" in order to clear the lands of Poland for German colonisation. After an official visit to Francoist Spain to meet Generalíssimo Francisco Franco in October 1940, Peiper was promoted to First Adjutant on 1 November 1940.

== Operation Barbarossa, 1941 ==
In February 1941, Reichsführer-SS Himmler informed adjutant Peiper about the upcoming Operation Barbarossa (22 June – 5 December 1941), for the invasion, conquest, and German colonisation of the Soviet Union. Moreover, Himmler and his staff travelled to occupied Poland, occupied Norway, Nazi Austria, and occupied Greece to see the progress of the Wehrmacht and Waffen-SS operations there, including the depopulation of Poland for German colonisation.

About his visit to the Łódź Ghetto, Peiper wrote that "it was a macabre image: we saw how the Jewish Ghetto Police, who wore hats without rims, and were armed with wooden clubs, inconsiderately made room for us." The episode in the Łódź Ghetto indicates Peiper's awareness of the criminality of the Nazi occupations, yet the anecdotes he wrote—about the Jewish Ghetto Police abusing the Jews—were meant to lessen the degree of his complicity in the war crimes of the Waffen-SS and of the Wehrmacht.

In the 11–15 June 1941 period, adjutant Peiper participated in the SS conference wherein Himmler presented plans for killing of 30 million Slavs in Eastern Europe, especially Russia and Ukraine; present were Kurt Wolff; Kurt Daluege (head of the Order Police), Erich von dem Bach-Zelewski (SS and Police Leader in Byelorussia); and Reinhard Heydrich (head of the Reich Security Main Office). When Nazi Germany invaded the Soviet Union on 22 June 1941, Himmler used a headquarters-train to tour the conquered Soviet lands; Himmler and Peiper inspected the work of the Einsatzkommando units who were depopulating the conquered lands. In Augustów, Poland, the Einsatzkommando Tilsit killed approximately 200 people; and in Grodno, Byelorussia, before Himmler and Peiper, Heydrich berated the leader of the local death squad for having shot only 96 Jews in a day.

In July 1941, Himmler and Peiper were in Białystok to witness the progress of the depopulation of that city and of Poland by the Order Police battalions, and met with Bach-Zalewski to discuss the deployment of units of the Kommandostab Reichsführer-SS ("Command Staff Reichsführer-SS"), which comprised 25,000 Waffen-SS soldiers tasked to execute racial and ideological war against the peoples of Russia. The Kommandostab units were under the authority of the local Higher SS and Police Leaders, who identified the local populations of Jews and "undesirables" to be killed.

As the first and second adjutants, Peiper and Werner Grothmann were aware of and handled all of Himmler's orders and communications. Peiper delivered the Kommandostab's daily body-count reports to Himmler. The 30 July 1941 report from Gustav Lombard's SS cavalry indicated that they had shot 800 Jews; the 11 August 1941 report from Lombard indicated that they had shot 6,526 looters (Jews). Peiper likewise delivered to Himmler the daily Einsatzgruppen murder statistics that compared the numbers of people killed against the pre-war projections of the timetable for depopulating the Soviet Union.

Peiper's adjutancy to Himmler ended in the summer of 1941, and Peiper was reassigned to the LSSAH motorised regiment in October 1941. Peiper rejoined the 1st SS Panzer Division Leibstandarte SS Adolf Hitler (LSSAH) whilst they fought in the Eastern Front, in the vicinity of the Black Sea. As the replacement for an injured company commander, Peiper assumed command of the 11th Company and fought the Red Army at Mariupol in Ukraine and Rostov-on-Don in southern Russia. Noted for his fighting spirit and aggressive leadership in battle, tank commander Peiper's victories came at the cost of many German tanks and casualties among Waffen-SS infantry.

The division was followed by Einsatzgruppe D, who were responsible for killing the local Jews, other civilians, Commissars, Red Army soldiers, and partisans. To facilitate the depopulation of the western Soviet Union, SS-General Sepp Dietrich, commander of the LSSAH, volunteered his Waffen-SS infantry to assist the Einsatzgruppe in the massacre of 1,800 people at the Gully of Petrushino. In May 1942, the LSSAH was sent to Vichy France for rest, recuperation, and refitting, and were subsequently reorganized into a Panzergrenadier division. Peiper was promoted to commander of the 3rd Battalion.

== Italy, 1943 ==
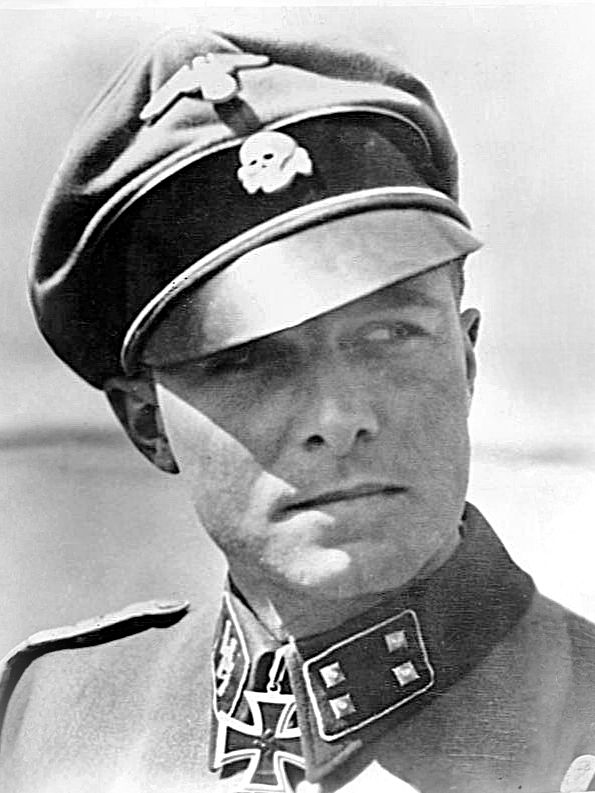
Peiper in 1943

In August 1943, Kampfgruppe Peiper was stationed in the Italian city of Cuneo, six kilometres north of the village of Boves in the commune of Boves. Fascist Italy ceased being a belligerent power of the Rome-Berlin Axis on 3 September 1943 with the signing of the Armistice of Cassibile between the Kingdom of Italy and the Allied Powers. Consequently, Nazi Germany responded on 8 September with Operation Achse, wherein Wehrmacht forces, including the LSSAH, invaded and occupied the north of Italy, in order to forcibly disarm the Italian army in situ.

=== Massacre at Boves ===
On 19 September 1943, in a firefight with the Waffen-SS occupiers, partisan guerrillas of the Italian Resistance Movement killed one soldier and captured two others in the vicinity of Boves, in the Piedmont region of north-west Italy. In a later firefight with the partisans, a Waffen-SS infantry company failed to rescue their comrades from the partisans. After this, the armoured units of Kampfgruppe Peiper assumed strategic control of the streets and the roads into and out of the village of Boves, and Peiper then threatened to destroy the village if the partisans did not release their Waffen-SS prisoners.

In an effort to avoid the Nazis' destruction of the Boves village, the local spokesmen of the Boves commune, the parish priest Giuseppe Bernardi and the businessman Alessandro Vasallo, successfully negotiated the partisans' release of their Waffen-SS prisoners and of the body of the SS soldier killed earlier. Despite the successfully negotiated release of the body and prisoners, Peiper ordered the soldiers of Kampfgruppe Peiper to summarily kill 24 men of the Boves village in retaliation for the resistance of the villagers. They also killed a woman when they looted and burned her house.

In the after action report to the LSSAH headquarters, Kampfgruppe Peiper described the Boves massacre as Peiper's heroic defence against anti-German attacks by Communist partisans in which Waffen-SS soldiers battled, defeated, and killed 17 bandits and partisans, and that "during the fights [with partisans] the villages of Boves and Costellar were burned down. [That] in nearly all [the] burning houses [stores of] ammunition exploded. Some bandits were shot."

== Ukraine, 1943 ==
In November 1943, the LSSAH fought in battles at Zhytomyr, in Ukraine. In the course of battle, although lacking experience in leading tanks, Peiper replaced the regiment's dead commander, and so assumed command of the 1st SS Panzer Regiment. In early December, Peiper was nominated for a medal for the successes of the 1st Regiment: the destruction of some Red Army artillery batteries and a division headquarters, having killed 2,280 Red Army soldiers in just two days of action (5-6 December), and delivering only three Red Army Prisoners of War (POWs) to military intelligence. The recommendation for awarding the medal to Peiper described the scorched-earth attacks of the 1st SS Panzer Regiment, wherein tank commander Peiper "attacked with all weapons and flame-throwers from his SPW" armoured fighting vehicle to defeat the Red Army defenders, and then "completely destroyed" the village of Pekartchina.

Peiper's over-aggressive style of leadership caused him to disregard tactical common sense in deploying the tanks and infantry forces of the 1st SS Panzer Regiment in battle against the Red Army. Peiper's battlefield victories cost more Waffen-SS casualties (soldiers killed and soldiers wounded) than would have been lost with textbook tactics to achieve the same victory. Attacking without the benefit of prior reconnaissance by scout units, Peiper's tank-and-infantry frontal assaults against entrenched Red Army units killed too many infantry and cost too much lost matériel for an essentially Pyrrhic victory; thus, after a month of Peiper's command, the 1st SS Panzer Regiment had only twelve working tanks.

In December 1943, because of his destructive leadership of the 1st SS Panzer Regiment in the Soviet Union, the division command of the LSSAH relieved Peiper of combat duty and transferred him to staff-officer duty at the division headquarters. Despite his uneven battlefield performance on the Eastern Front, his political value for Nazi propaganda was greater than his shortcomings as a military officer; thus, on 27 January 1944, Hitler presented the Oak Leaves to Peiper.

=== Blowtorch Battalion ===
Peiper's battalion left France in January 1943 for the Eastern Front, where the Wehrmacht had begun to lose the initiative, especially in the Battle of Stalingrad. During the Third Battle of Kharkov, the battalion became known for an audacious rescue of the encircled 320th Infantry Division. In a letter home, Peiper described hand-to-hand fighting with a Soviet ski battalion in an effort to lead the division, including its sick and wounded, to safety.

The rescue culminated in a fierce battle with the Soviet forces at the village of Krasnaya Polyana. Upon entering the village, Peiper's troops made a terrible discovery. All the men in his small rearguard medical detachment who had been left there had been killed and then mutilated. An SS sergeant in Peiper's ration supply company later stated that Peiper responded in kind: "In the village, the two petrol trucks were burnt and 25 Germans killed by partisans and Soviet soldiers. As revenge, Peiper ordered the burning down of the whole village and the shooting of its inhabitants." (The testimony was obtained in November 1944 by the Western Allies.)

On 6 May 1943, Peiper was awarded the German Cross in Gold for his achievements in February 1943 around Kharkov, where his unit gained the nickname the "Blowtorch Battalion" (Lötlampenbataillon). Reportedly, the nickname derived from the torching and slaughter of two Soviet villages where their inhabitants were either shot or burned.

Ukrainian sources, including surviving witness Ivan Kiselev, who was 14 at the time of the massacre, described the killings at the villages of Yefremovka and Semenovka on 17 February 1943. On 12 February, troops of the LSSAH occupied the two villages, where retreating Soviet forces had wounded two SS officers. Five days later, LSSAH troops killed 872 men, women, and children in retaliation. Some 240 of these were burned alive in the church of Yefremovka.

In August 1944, when an SS commander, formerly of LSSAH, was captured south of Falaise in France and interrogated by the Allies, he stated that Peiper was "particularly eager to execute the order to burn villages". Peiper wrote to Potthast in March 1943: "Our reputation precedes us as a wave of terror and is one of our best weapons. Even old Genghis Khan would gladly have hired us as assistants."

On 9 March 1943, Peiper was awarded the Knight's Cross of the Iron Cross, the most prestigious military decoration of the Third Reich, for which Reichsführer-SS Himmler congratulated him in a live radio broadcast: "Heartfelt congratulations for the Knight's Cross, my dear Jochen! I am proud of you!" In that stage of the Second World War, Nazi propaganda portrayed tank commander Peiper as an exemplary military leader. The official SS newspaper, Das Schwarze Korps (The Black Corps) reported that Peiper's actions in Kharkov demonstrated that he is a Waffen-SS tank commander who always is "the master of the situation, in all its phases", that Peiper's "quick decision-making" assured victory in the field through his "bold and unorthodox orders" and that he is "a born leader, one filled with the highest sense of responsibility for the life of every one of his men, but who [was] also able to be hard, if necessary" to complete the mission.

In the post-war period, such hyperbolic descriptions of the tactical prowess of the tank commander Peiper glamourised the Waffen-SS man into a war hero of Germany. In the SS hierarchy, Peiper was an SS man and military officer who received, obeyed, and executed orders with minimal discussion, and expected that his soldiers receive, obey, and execute his orders without question.

In July 1943, the Panzergrenadier Division LSSAH participated in Operation Citadel in the area of Kursk, in which Kampfgruppe Peiper fought well against the Red Army. After Operation Citadel failed, the Panzergrenadier Division LSSAH was redeployed from the Eastern Front in Russia to the north of Fascist Italy.

== Western Front, 1944 ==
In March 1944, the LSSAH was withdrawn from the Eastern Front and sent to be reformed in Nazi-occupied Belgium. New and replacement soldiers were integrated into their ranks; most were adolescent boys, unlike the Nazi ideologue, fanatical soldiers from the 1930s. The difficult training and the brutal hazing-and-initiation rituals to which the new soldiers were subjected resulted in five soldiers being executed for not meeting the standards of Kampfgruppe Peiper; SS-Obersturmbannführer Peiper then allegedly ordered the new soldiers to look at the corpses of the failed soldiers. In 1956, the judicial authorities of the Federal Republic of Germany opened a war crime case to investigate the accusation that Peiper deliberately killed some of his own Waffen-SS soldiers as a point of unit discipline. In 1966, Peiper claimed he knew nothing of it, and the lack of contradictory evidence and witnesses closed the case.

As the Allied invasion (Operation Overlord, 6 June 1944) began, the LSSAH were deployed to the coast of the English Channel to confront the expected Allied invasion at Pas de Calais in northern France; transport to the frontlines was limited, and the Allied air forces controlled the skies. From 18 July 1944, the Kampfgruppe Peiper regiment saw action, but Peiper rarely was at the frontlines, because of the uneven terrain and the requisite radio silence. As with the other Waffen-SS and Wehrmacht units in the area, Kampfgruppe Peiper fought defensively until Operation Cobra (25–31 July 1944) collapsed the German front when the US Army destroyed every tank of the LSSAH and killed 25 per cent of their force of 19,618 soldiers.

After suffering a nervous breakdown during the fighting around Caen, Peiper was relieved of command on 2 August 1944. In September–October 1944 he was hospitalized; initially in Paris, and then to Tegernsee Reserve Hospital in Bavaria near his wife Sigi and children.

So Peiper was not in command of the 1st SS Panzer Regiment during Operation Luttich (7–13 August 1944), the series of failed counter-attacks at Avranches.

He rejoined his regiment in October 1944. In November, the 1st SS Panzer Corps was moved to the Cologne area to assist cleanup after Allied bombing. The new recruits were appalled by having to retrieve mashed and mangled bodies. Peiper remarked, "Their hatred for the enemy was such ... I swear it. I could not always keep it under control." After going to Duren after a raid he confessed that he "wanted to castrate the swine who did this with a broken glass bottle" Peiper and his men wanted revenge.

=== Battle of the Bulge ===
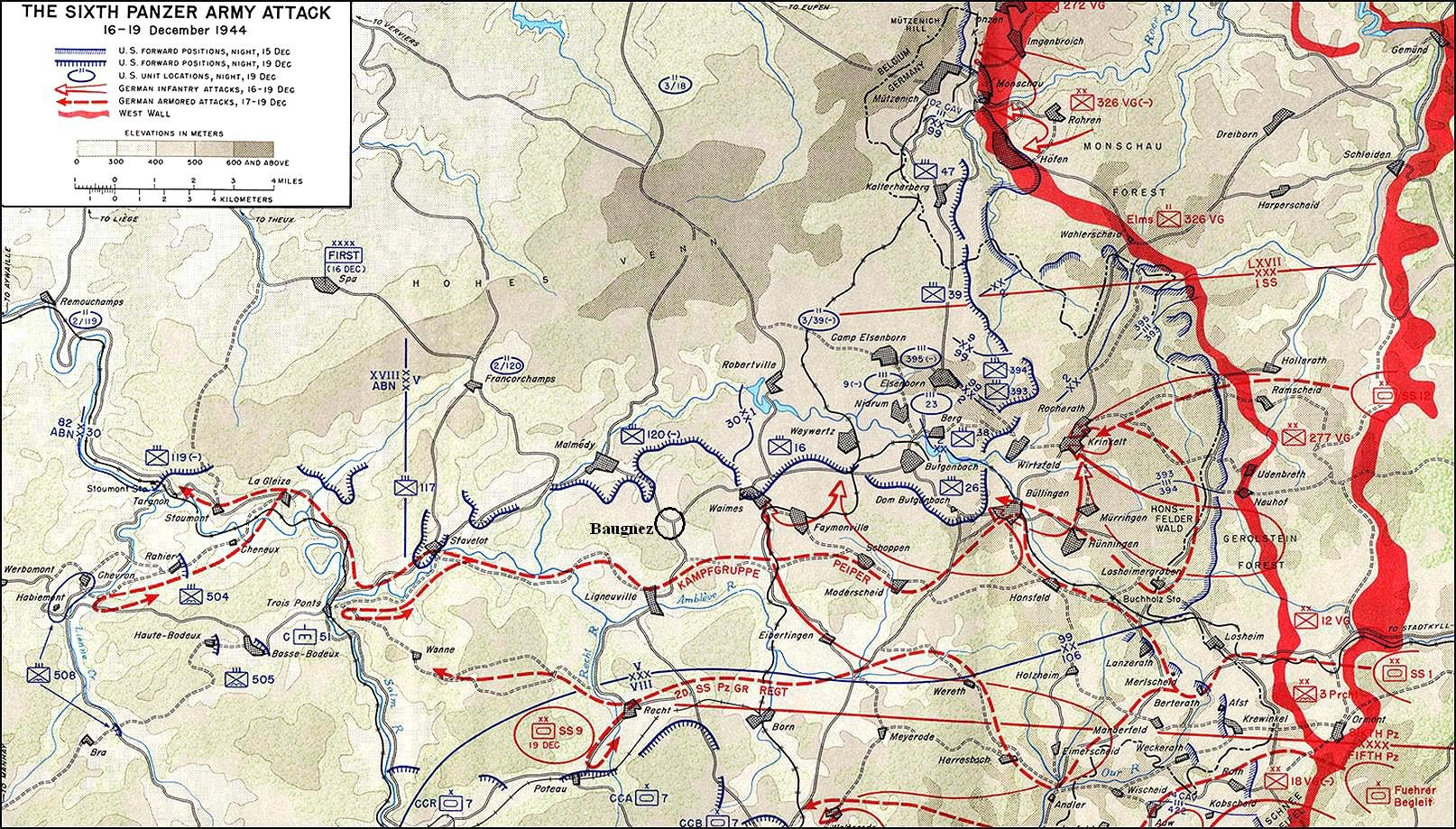
The route of Kampfgruppe Peiper: The black circle indicates the Baugnez crossroads where the Waffen-SS committed the Malmedy massacre on 17 December 1944.

In the autumn of 1944, the Wehrmacht continually repelled Allied assaults to breach, penetrate, and cross the Siegfried Line, whilst Hitler sought the opportunity to seize the initiative on the Western Front. The result was Nazi Germany's Ardennes Offensive, a desperate, strategic gambit whereby the German armies were intended to break through the US lines in the Ardennes forest, cross the River Meuse, and then seize the city of Antwerp in order to break and divide the Allied front.

The 6th Panzer Army was to penetrate the American lines between Aachen and the Schnee Eifel, in order to seize the bridges over the Meuse, on both sides of the city of Liège. The 6th Panzer Army designated the LSSAH as the mobile-strike force, under the command of SS-Oberführer Wilhelm Mohnke. Four combined-arms battle groups composed the 6th Panzer Division; Peiper commanded Kampfgruppe Peiper, the best-equipped battle group, which included the 501st Heavy Panzer Battalion equipped with seventy-ton Tiger II tanks. Kampfgruppe Peiper was to seize the bridges on the Meuse river between the cities of Liège and Huy. To address the shortage of fuel, headquarters provided Peiper with a map indicating the locations of US Army fuel depots, where he intended to seize the fuel stores from the few US Army soldiers manning those fuel dumps.

The 6th Panzer Army assigned Kampfgruppe Peiper to routes that included narrow and single-lane roads, which compelled the infantry, armoured vehicles, and tanks to travel as a convoy approximately 25 kilometres (16 mi) long. Peiper complained that the roads assigned were suitable for bicycles, but not for tanks; yet the chief of staff Fritz Krämer told Peiper: "I don't care how and what you do. Just make it to the Meuse. Even if you've only one tank left when you get there."

Peiper's vehicles reached the point of departure at midnight, which delayed the attack by Kampfgruppe Peiper by almost twenty-four hours. The plan was to advance through Losheimergraben, but the two infantry divisions tasked to open the route for Kampfgruppe Peiper had failed to do so on the first day of battle. In the morning of 17 December, Kampfgruppe Peiper captured Honsfeld and the US Army's stores of fuel. Peiper continued west until the road became impassable, a short distance from the town of Ligneuville; that detour compelled Peiper's units towards the Baugnez crossroads, near the city of Malmedy, Belgium.

=== War crimes ===
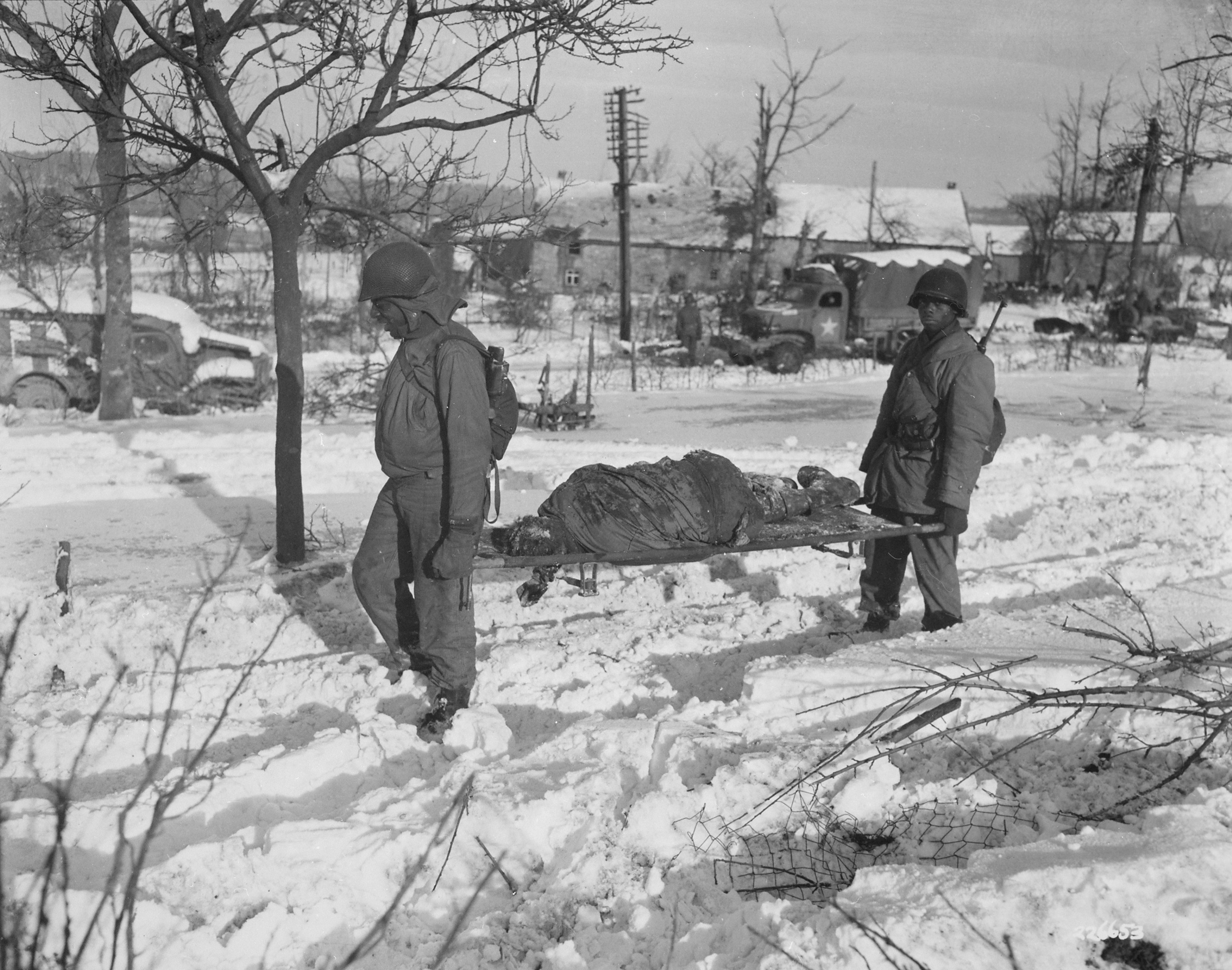
US soldiers remove the corpse of a soldier killed by the Waffen-SS in the Malmedy massacre (17 December 1944).

During Peiper's advance on 17 December 1944, his armoured units and half-tracks confronted a lightly armed convoy of about thirty American vehicles at the Baugnez crossroads near Malmedy. The troops, mainly elements of the American 285th Field Artillery Observation Battalion, were quickly overcome and captured. Along with other American prisoners of war captured earlier, they were ordered to stand in a meadow before the Germans opened fire on them with machine guns, killing 84 soldiers, and leaving their bodies in the snow. The survivors were able to reach American lines later that day, and their story spread rapidly throughout the American front lines.

In Honsfeld, Peiper's men murdered several other American prisoners. Other murders of POWs and civilians were reported in Büllingen, Ligneuville and Stavelot, Cheneux, La Gleize, and Stoumont on 17, 18, 19 and 20, 21 December. On 19 December, in the area between Stavelot and Trois-Ponts, while the Germans were trying to regain control of the bridge over the Amblève River (crucial for allowing reinforcements and supplies to reach them), men from Kampfgruppe Peiper raped and killed a number of Belgian civilians. The battle group was eventually declared responsible for the deaths of 362 prisoners of war and 111 civilians.

=== Defeat and retreat ===
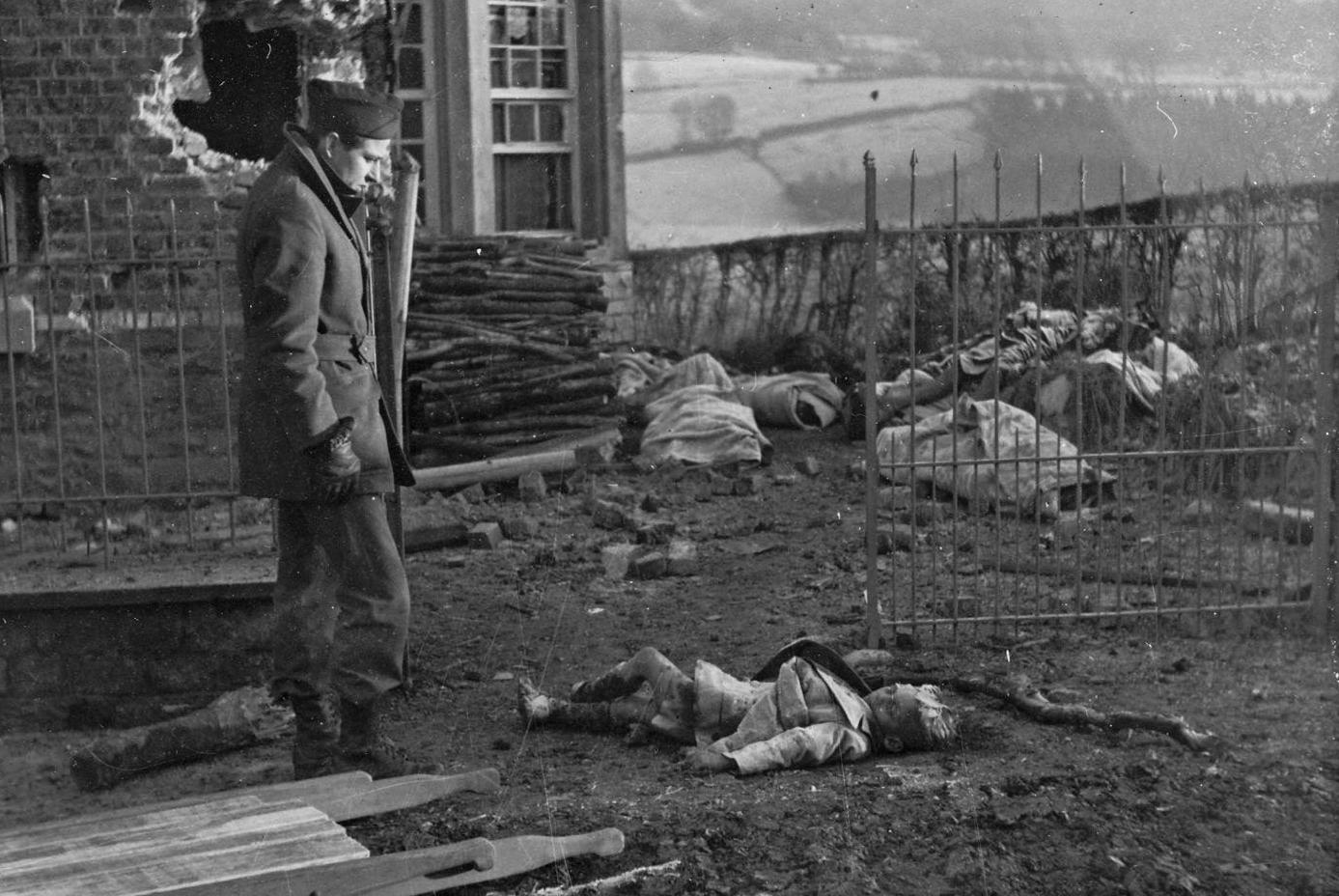
The war correspondent Jean Marin observes the corpses of Belgian civilians killed by the Waffen-SS SG Knittel, at the Legaye maison in Stavelot.

Peiper crossed Ligneuville and reached the heights of Stavelot on the left bank of the Amblève River at nightfall of the second day of the operation. The battle group paused for the night, allowing the Americans to reorganize. After heavy fighting, Peiper's armour crossed the bridge on the Amblève. The spearhead continued on, without having fully secured Stavelot. By then, the surprise factor had been lost. The US forces regrouped and blew up several bridges ahead of Peiper's advance, trapping the battle group in the deep valley of the Amblève, downstream from Trois-Ponts. The weather also improved, permitting the Allied air forces to operate. Airstrikes destroyed or heavily damaged numerous German vehicles. Peiper's command was in disarray: some units had lost their way among difficult terrain or in the dark, while company commanders preferred to stay with Peiper at the head of the column and thus were unable to provide guidance to their own units.

Peiper attacked Stoumont on 19 December and took the town amid heavy fighting. He was unable to protect his rear, which enabled American troops to cut him off from the only possible supply road for ammunition and fuel at Stavelot. Without supplies, and with no contact with other German units behind him, Peiper could advance no further. American attacks on Stoumont forced the remnants of the battle group to retreat to La Gleize. On 24 December, Peiper abandoned his vehicles and retreated with the remaining men. German wounded and American prisoners were also left behind. According to Peiper, 717 men returned to the German lines out of 3,000 at the beginning of the operation.

Despite the failure of Peiper's battle group and the loss of all tanks, Mohnke recommended Peiper for a further award. The events at the Baugnez crossroads were described in glowing terms: "Without regard for threats from the flanks and only inspired by the thought of a deep breakthrough, the Kampfgruppe proceeded ... to Ligneuville and destroyed at Baugnez an enemy supply column and after the annihilation of the units blocking their advance, succeeded in causing the staff of the 49th Anti-Aircraft Brigade to flee." Rather than a stain on Peiper's honour, the killing of POWs was celebrated in official records. In January 1945, the Swords were added to his Knight's Cross.

== Hungary, 1945 ==
In early 1945, in Hungary, Kampfgruppe Peiper fought in Operation Southwind (17–24 February 1945) and in Operation Spring Awakening (6–15 March 1945) in the battles of which, despite killing many enemy soldiers, Peiper's aggressive style of command cost many more wounded and dead Waffen-SS soldiers than were necessary to win the battle. On 1 May 1945, as the Leibstandarte SS Adolf Hitler was forced into Austria, Peiper's men learned of the death of the Führer the previous day. On 8 May, the German high command ordered the units of the Division Leibstandarte SS Adolf Hitler to surrender to the US Army that was across the River Enns.

== Capture and arrest ==
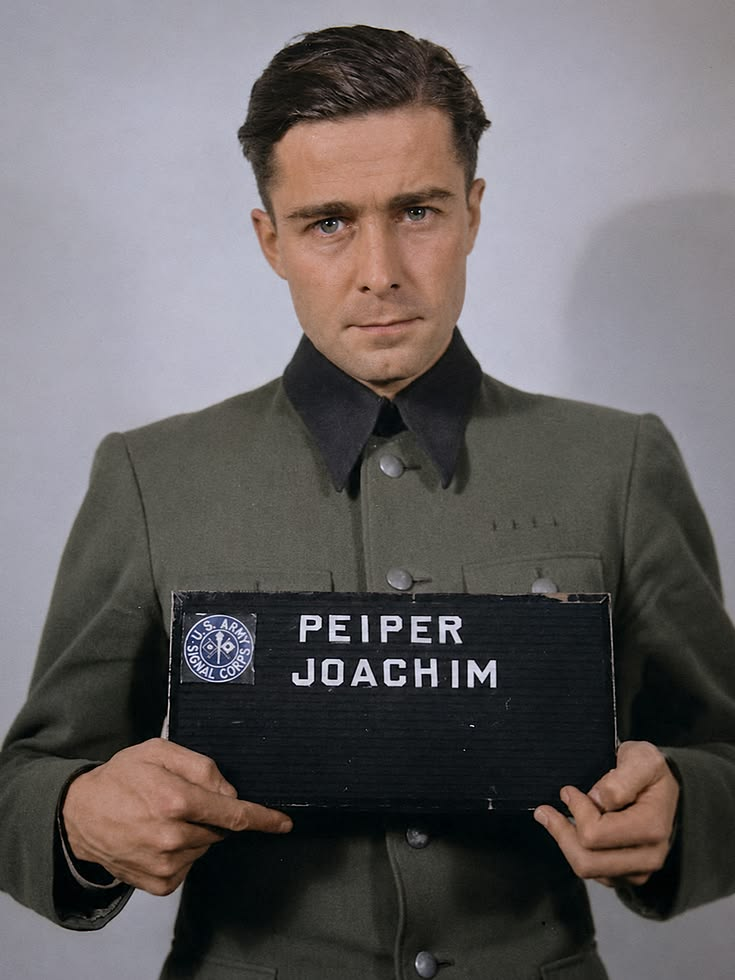
Lt. Col. Peiper, who is in custody after surrendering to the U.S. military, May 1945 (colorized)

Peiper blatantly defied his superiors' official order to surrender and did not want to surrender en masse to the U.S. Army and be sent to a prisoner-of-war camp. His goal was to reach his home in Germany on foot without drawing attention to himself. Separating from his unit, he set out alone, secretly crossing the Austrian border and walking for days southward toward the Bavarian Alps region of Germany.

On 22 May 1945, he came across a checkpoint set up by American soldiers in the town of Rottach-Egern, near Lake Schliersee. Peiper was not wearing his rank insignia or SS symbols. When he was captured, he claimed to the Americans that he was a low-ranking Wehrmacht (German Army) soldier and presented false identification documents; however, investigations conclusively identified him as Lieutenant Colonel Joachim Peiper, a high-ranking Waffen-SS commander.

In late June 1945, US Army war crime investigators began the forensic investigation of the Malmedy massacre that the Waffen-SS committed on 17 December 1944. The war crimes committed during the Battle of the Bulge were attributed to Battle Group Peiper, so the US Army searched PoW camps for the Waffen-SS soldiers assigned to Peiper's command. Moreover, as the battle-group commander, Peiper headed the list of war criminals sought by the US Army from among four million prisoners of war. On 21 August 1945, Peiper was found and identified as the suspected author of the war crime massacre of 84 US soldiers in a farmer's field near the town of Malmédy, Belgium.

In July 1945, during his interrogations by JAG and military intelligence officers, Peiper revealed his commitment to Nazism; when the Army interrogators asked his opinion about the plight of the Poles and the Jews, Peiper agitatedly replied that: "All Jews are bad and all Poles are bad. We have just cleansed our society and moved these people into camps, and you let them loose!" Moreover, as a Waffen-SS officer, Peiper also lamented to the Army interrogators that the US government was wrong in having refused to incorporate the Waffen-SS into the US Army to "prepare to fight the Russians" in defence of Western civilisation.

In Upper Bavaria, at the US military jail in Freising, the judicial and military intelligence interrogators soon learned that, although Peiper and his Waffen-SS troops were hardened soldiers, they had not been trained to withstand interrogation as prisoners of war. Being psychologically unsophisticated men, some SS POWs readily answered the questions asked of them by the interrogators; other SS POWs claimed they only spoke to interrogators after having endured threats, beatings, and mock trials.

In the course of his interrogations, Peiper assumed command responsibility for the actions of his soldiers. In December 1945, the Army transferred him to the prison at Schwäbisch Hall, and there integrated Peiper to a group of approximately 1,000 Waffen-SS soldiers and officers of the LSSAH who also awaited judicial processing for their war crimes. On 16 April 1946, the prison transferred 300 Wehrmacht and Waffen-SS POWs to the Dachau concentration camp, where a military tribunal would hear their war crime cases.

== War crimes trial ==
In the 16 May – 16 July 1946 period, at the Dachau Concentration Camp, a military tribunal heard the Malmedy Massacre Trial of 74 defendants, which included Peiper, Sepp Dietrich (commander of 6th SS Panzer Army), Fritz Krämer (Dietrich's chief of staff), and Hermann Prieß (commander of I SS Panzer Corps). The US Army's bill of war crime charges was based upon the facts reported in the sworn statements given by the Party, Wehrmacht, and Waffen-SS POWs in the Schwäbisch Hall prison.

To counter the evidence in the sworn statements of the Nazi defendants and the prosecution witnesses, the lead defence attorney, Lt. Col. Willis M. Everett, tried to show that the sworn statements had been obtained by inappropriate interrogation. Defence counsel Everett then called Lt. Col. Hal D. McCown, commander 2nd Battalion, 119th Infantry Regiment, to give testimony about his captivity—as a prisoner of war—of the Waffen-SS who captured him and his unit on 21 December 1944, in the vicinity of La Gleize, Belgium. In his trial testimony, Lt. Col. McCown said that he had not witnessed Col. Peiper's Waffen-SS soldiers mistreating their American prisoners of war.

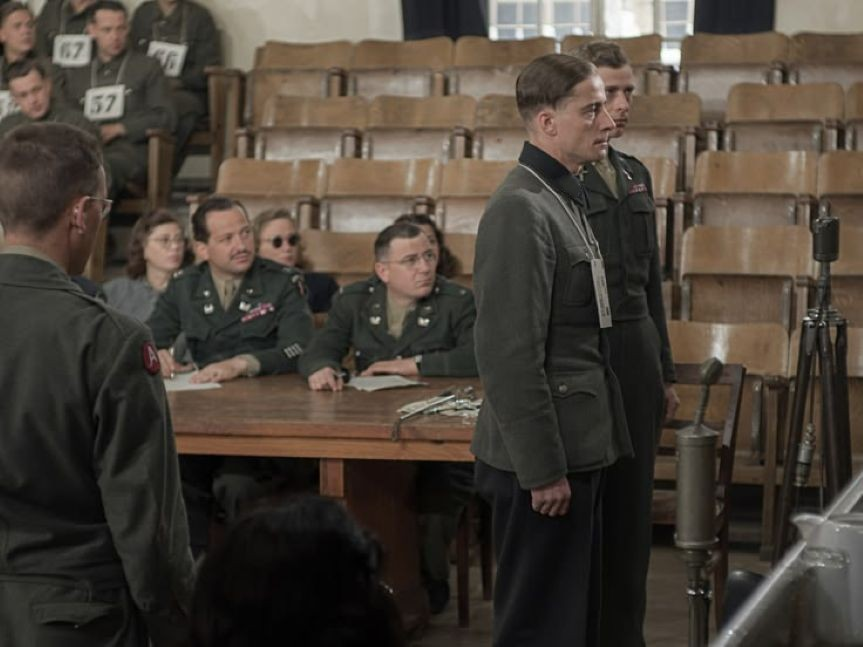
Waffen-SS Lt. Col. Joachim Peiper, while standing before American judges, Malmedy massacre trial, 1946 (colorized)

The prosecutor countered that, by the time Lt. Col. McCown and his soldiers had been captured on 21 December, battle group commander Peiper already was aware that the tactical situation of being out-numbered, out-gunned, and out-manoeuvred placed Kampfgruppe Peiper in danger of imminent capture by the US Army. While on 17 December 1944, the units of the Battle Group Peiper at Malmédy, Belgium were advancing to their objectives, by 21 December 1944, continual firefights with the US Army had divided and dispersed scattered Battle Group Peiper, and thus almost trapped Peiper's unit, and Peiper, at La Gleize. By that point, Peiper's vehicles had little fuel and his soldiers had suffered 80 per cent casualty rates.

Defence counsel Everett called only Peiper to testify. In his testimony, Peiper communicated only calculation about the usefulness of his American prisoners of war, testifying that when the Peiper Battle Group fled afoot from the town of La Gleize, Col. Peiper made hostages of Lt. Col. McCown and some of his soldiers in order to protect his Waffen-SS soldiers from capture by the US Army.

Despite the damning and incriminating facts that Peiper testified to the military tribunal, the other defendant SS-men, supported by their German lawyers, unwisely asked for the opportunity to testify. The prosecutor's cross-examinations compelled the SS men to behave like "a bunch of drowning rats ... turning on each other" to survive; thus did the Nazi PoW testimonies—of soldiers and officers—about the Malmedy war crimes provide the military tribunal with reasons to condemn to death several of the Waffen-SS defendants.

The military tribunal were unconvinced by Peiper's testimony that, as the commanding officer of the Battle Group Peiper, he, Col. Peiper, had no command responsibility for the summary execution of American POWs by his Waffen-SS soldiers. When asked about having ordered his soldiers to summarily murder Belgian civilians, Peiper said that the dead people were partisan guerrillas—not civilians.

Two witnesses testified to having heard Peiper on two occasions order the summary execution of US POWs; yet, when the prosecutor asked whether or not he gave the orders for the summary executions, Peiper denied the veracity of the eyewitness testimony, claiming that the testimony had been coerced from men under mental duress and physical torture.

=== Commuted death sentence ===
On 16 July 1946, the military tribunal for the Malmedy Massacre Trial convicted Joachim Peiper of the war crimes of which he was accused and sentenced him to be hanged. In the judicial system of the US Army, a sentence of death is automatically reviewed by the US Army Review Board, and, in October 1947, death-sentence reviewers commuted some verdicts into long imprisonment for Nazi war criminals. In March 1948, Gen. Lucius D. Clay, the US military governor of Occupied Germany, reviewed 43 death sentences, and confirmed the legality of only 12 death sentences, including the death sentence of Waffen-SS Col. Peiper.

In 1951, about politicking for the political rehabilitation of Waffen-SS Colonel Joachim Peiper, ex-general Heinz Guderian said to a correspondent:

At the moment, I'm negotiating with General Handy [in Heidelberg], because [he] wants to hang the unfortunate Peiper. McCloy is powerless, because the Malmedy trial is being handled by Eucom, and is not subordinate to McCloy. As a result, I have decided to cable President Truman and ask him if he is familiar with this idiocy.

In 1948, the judicial reviewers of the trial verdicts of the military tribunal commuted the war crime death sentences of some Waffen-SS defendants in the Malmedy massacre trial to life imprisonment. In 1951, Peiper's death sentence was commuted to life imprisonment. In 1954, it was further commuted to 35 years imprisonment. He was released on parole on 22 December 1956. When Peiper was told he was being released by two US soldiers, he was so shocked that he stared at them silently. The political lobbying of the network of SS men arranged and realised Peiper's early release from prison and his finding employment; the Mutual Aid Community of Former Members of the Waffen SS (HIAG) already had found employment for Frau Peiper near the Landsberg Prison wherein her husband resided. Thanks to the political influence of Albert Prinzing, an ex-functionary in the Sicherheitsdienst (SD) security service, Peiper was employed at the Porsche automobile company.

== Post-war revisionist ==
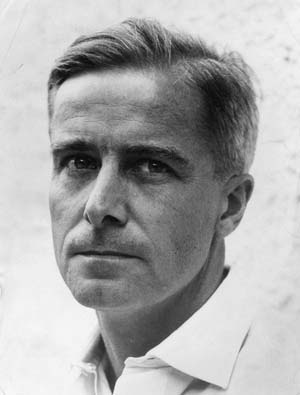
Peiper in the 1960s

On release from Landsberg Prison, Joachim Peiper acted discreetly and did not associate with known Nazis in public, especially with ex-Waffen-SS soldiers and the Mutual Aid Association of Former Waffen-SS Members (HIAG); privately, Peiper remained a true-believer Nazi and member of the secret community of Waffen-SS in the Federal Republic of Germany.

In 1959, Peiper attended the national meeting of the Association of Knight's Cross Recipients. He travelled with Walter Harzer, the HIAG historian, and reunited with Sepp Dietrich and Heinz Lammerding, who had also been formally identified as Nazi war criminals. His active social life in the Waffen-SS community included Peiper's public participation in the funerals of dead Nazis such as those of Kurt Meyer, Paul Hausser, and Dietrich. Collaborating with the HIAG, Peiper secretly worked for the political rehabilitation of Waffen-SS soldiers and officers, by suppressing their war crime records and misrepresenting them as war veterans of the Wehrmacht. Nevertheless, self-awareness of his legalistic chicanery allowed Peiper to tell a friend: "I, personally, think that every attempt at rehabilitation during our lifetime is unrealistic, but one can still collect material."

On 17 January 1957, the Porsche automobile company employed Peiper in Stuttgart. In the course of his employment, Italian trade union workers formally complained that Peiper was unacceptable as a co-worker because he remained a Nazi and because of the wartime Boves massacre committed by his command, the Kampfgruppe Peiper, in Italy. An owner of the car company, Ferry Porsche, personally intervened to promote Peiper into a management job, but the trade unions legally refused to work with Peiper; despite the friendship with Porsche, and because of lost sales of cars in the US—for employing a Nazi war criminal—the Porsche automobile company dismissed Peiper from his employment.

On 30 December 1960, Peiper filed a lawsuit against the Porsche car company, wherein the attorney claimed that Joachim Peiper was not a Nazi war criminal because the Allies had used the Malmedy massacre trial (1946) as propaganda to defame the German people; likewise the Nuremberg trials (20 November 1945 – 1 October 1946) and the Malmedy massacre trial were anti-German propaganda. Peiper's attorney cited documents by Freda Utley which said that the US Army had tortured the Waffen-SS defendants in the Malmedy massacre trial.

The court ordered that Porsche void the employment contract and indemnify Peiper for the dismissal. Moreover, that lost job allowed Der Freiwillige, the official newspaper of the HIAG, to misrepresent Peiper as having been "unfairly sentenced" for war crimes committed by other Nazis. The HIAG then found Peiper employment as a trainer of car salesmen at the Volkswagen automobile company.

== Further prosecutions ==
In the early 1960s, Cold War geopolitics in western Europe required transforming Germany from enemy (Nazi Germany) to ally (Federal Republic of Germany) for consequent integration into NATO. Consequent to the relative de-Nazification of German society, the economy of the Federal Republic of Germany (FRG) disallowed ex-Nazis to hide among the educated staff of a business company in post-war Germany; a Nazi diploma was unacceptable for employment.

Unlike in the aftermath of the Second World War (1939–1945) in Europe, when the Allies prosecuted war crimes under a limited remit (1945–1947), the Federal Republic of Germany continually extended the statute of limitations for the prosecution of war crimes in order to successfully hunt, capture, and prosecute the war criminals of the Nazi party, the Wehrmacht, the Waffen-SS, and the Gestapo. In their testimonies at the war crime trials in the FRG, the Nazi war criminals repeatedly named SS-Obersturmbannführer Joachim Peiper as an active participant in the massacres of civilians and POWs at the Eastern front and at the Western front of the War; among the fellow Nazis who betrayed Peiper in court were Karl Wolff (senior adjutant to Himmler) and Werner Grothmann (Peiper's successor as adjutant to Himmler). At trial, the court heard Erich von dem Bach-Zelewski (Bandenbekämpfung chief for occupied Europe) speak of Himmler's plans to "rid Russia of thirty million Slavic people" and Himmler's pronouncements, at Minsk, that he was "determined to eliminate the Jews".

In 1964, the village of Boves, Italy erected a monument commemorating the victims of the Boves Massacre committed by the Kampfgruppe Peiper on 13 September 1943. Offended by that explicit, public identification as a war criminal, Peiper asked the Mutual Aid Association of Former Members of the Waffen-SS (HIAG) to legally defend him against that war-criminal label. Peiper's defence attorney said that Italian Communists had fabricated evidence to substantiate false Nazi war crime accusations; Peiper again repeated that Battle Group Peiper had to destroy the village of Boves in the course of the Waffen-SS defence against Communist partisans.

On 23 June 1964, the Central Office of the State Justice Administration for the Investigation of National Socialist Crimes formally accused Peiper of perpetrating the Boves Massacre in 1943. The formal accusation was based upon statements of two ex-partisans who recognized SS Lt. Col. Joachim Peiper from two published photographs in a picture book about the Battle of the Bulge and from a photograph of SS-Obersturmbannführer Peiper observing the incineration of the village of Boves. In 1968, the German District Court in Stuttgart determined that Battle Group Peiper had set houses afire and that "a portion of the victims killed was from rioting that was committed by [the Waffen-SS soldiers]". Nevertheless, despite the battle group's collective culpability for the war crime at Boves, there was no evidence of the individual command responsibility that SS-Obersturmbannführer Joachim Peiper, himself, had directly ordered the massacre of villagers at Boves, Italy.

== Personal life ==
In 1938, Peiper met and courted Sigurd Hinrichsen (1912-1979), a secretary who was a friend of Lina Heydrich (wife of Reinhard Heydrich) and a friend of Hedwig Potthast, secretary and mistress to Himmler. On 26 June 1939, Peiper married Sigurd in an SS ceremony; Himmler was the guest of honour. The Peipers lived in Berlin until its bombing in 1940; Sigurd Peiper then went to live in Rottach-Egern, Upper Bavaria, near Himmler's second residence. They had three children.

== Final years ==
In 1972, Joachim and Sigurd Peiper moved to Traves, Haute-Saône, in eastern France, where he owned a house. Under the pseudonym "Rainer Buschmann", Peiper worked as a self-employed English-to-German translator for the German publisher Stuttgarter MotorBuch Verlag, translating books of military history. Despite his biography and working pseudonymously, they lived under his true, German name, "Joachim Peiper", and soon attracted the notice of anti-fascists.

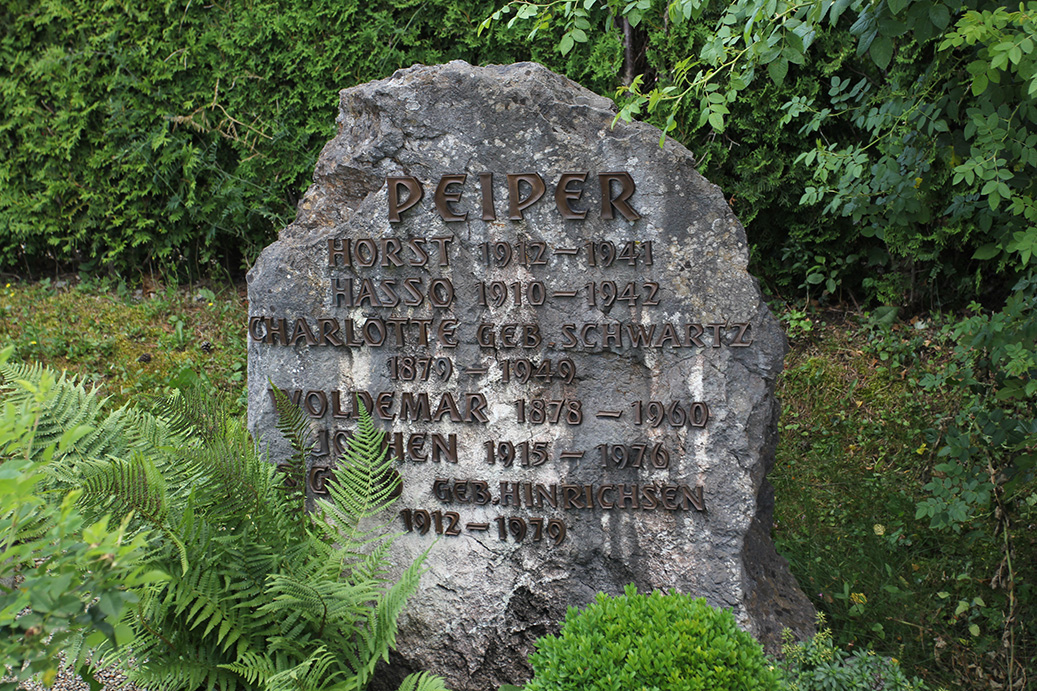
Grave in the cemetery of the catholic St. Anna church in Schondorf am Ammersee

In 1974, a former member of the French Resistance recognised Peiper and reported his presence in metropolitan France to the French Communist Party. In 1976, the historian of the French Communist Party searched the Gestapo files for the personnel file of SS-Oberststurmbannführer Joachim Peiper to determine his whereabouts. On 21 June 1976, anti-Nazi political activists distributed informational flyers to the Traves community informing them that Peiper was a Nazi war criminal residing among them. On 22 June 1976, an article in the L'Humanité newspaper confirmed that Peiper was living in the village.

The confirmation of Peiper's Nazi identity and presence in France attracted journalists to whom Peiper readily gave interviews, wherein he claimed that he was a victim of Communist harassment due to his role in the war. In an interview (J'ai payé "I Already Have Paid"), Peiper said he was an innocent man who had paid for his war crimes (referring to the Malmedy massacre) with twelve years of prison. He said he was innocent of the earlier Boves massacre war crime in Italy. He also said, "In 1940, French people weren't brave, that's why I'm here". These insulting remarks angered the press and residents. It was reported that he and his wife left France and moved to West Germany due to death threats.

== Death ==
On Bastille Day, 14 July 1976, French communists attacked and set fire to Peiper's house in Traves. When the fire was extinguished, firefighters found the charred remains of a man holding a pistol and a .22 calibre rifle, as if defending himself. The arson investigators determined that person had died from smoke inhalation. The anti-Nazi political group The Avengers claimed responsibility for the arson that killed Peiper; nonetheless, because of the destruction caused by the arson, some French police authorities remained unconvinced that Joachim Peiper was the person found.

== Neo-Nazi legacy ==
In the United States, Joachim Peiper is an idol of neo-Nazi Americans who romanticise the Waffen-SS as German war heroes, rather than recognize them as Nazi war criminals. In the post-war period of the late 1940s and early 1950s, the cultural context—xenophobic Russo-American Cold War and reactionary McCarthyism—allowed historical, factual, and personal misrepresentations of Peiper to coalesce into the cult of personality practised by certain right-wing organisations, such as the HIAG (Mutual Aid Association of Former Members of the Waffen-SS) who sought his early release from war crime imprisonment in West Germany. In American popular culture, Peiper's military bearing, good looks, commanding presence and a chestful of Nazi medals earned him many right-wing admirers in civilian society and in military society.

In the US military, the idolatry of Peiper penetrated the official publications of the U.S. Department of Defense (DoD). In 2019, the DoD Facebook account included a colourised military photograph of Peiper in Waffen-SS uniform in an audiovisual commemoration of the 75th anniversary of the US Army fighting Wehrmacht and Waffen-SS soldiers at the Battle of the Bulge which included the Malmedy Massacre (1944) committed by Kampfgruppe Peiper. Peiper's Waffen-SS photograph provoked "widespread backlash on social media" because the DoD publication appeared to celebrate a Nazi war criminal as a German war hero; the DoD apologised and deleted the photograph. Despite that political misstep, the Pentagon used Peiper's Waffen-SS photograph to represent the German enemy fighting the US Army airborne corps in the Battle of the Bulge. Moreover, the Facebook page of the Army's 10th Mountain Division also featured Peiper's colourised Waffen-SS military photograph to represent the German enemy they fought in the Second World War.

The Washington Post and The New York Times newspapers quoted Facebook commentators who said that the DoD's positive military biography of the war criminal Joachim Peiper was a "vile and disturbing" exercise in historical negationism, which had the tone of "a 'fanboy-flavoured' piece" of right-wing propaganda. Moreover, the researchers of The Washington Post traced the source of Peiper's colourised photograph to the Twitter account of a pro-Nazi artist who publishes photographs of Nazis, with captions of supportive praise for Nazism and Hitler, and concluded that:

It remains unclear how Pentagon and Army officials cleared an image, apparently created by an artist who celebrates Nazi propaganda online, to be published alongside a tribute to the American soldiers who fought and died to defeat a fascist regime 75 years ago. But the misstep is just the latest in a month of embarrassing incidents for the US Army, which has been recently slammed with multiple allegations of white supremacist activity.
