= 333rd Field Artillery Regiment =

US military unit

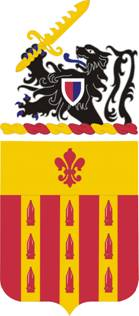
- Coat of arms
- Active: 1917
- Country: United States
- Branch: Army
- Type: Field artillery
- Motto: THREE ROUNDS

Insignia
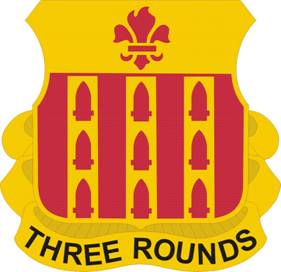
- Distinctive unit insignia

The 333rd Field Artillery Regiment is a regiment of the Field Artillery Branch of the United States Army.

Part of the regiment's history can be traced to the 333rd Field Artillery Battalion, an African-American racially segregated United States Army unit during World War II. The battalion landed at Normandy in early July 1944 and saw continuous combat as corps artillery throughout the summer. Beginning in October 1944 it was located in Schoenberg, Belgium as part of the U.S. VIII Corps. The unit was partially overrun by Germans during the onset of the Battle of the Bulge on 17 December 1944. While most of the 333rd withdrew west towards Bastogne, in advance of the German assault, Service and C Batteries remained behind to cover the advance of the 106th Infantry Division. The two batteries suffered heavy casualties, and eleven men were massacred near the Belgian hamlet of Wereth.

== History ==
=== World War I ===
The 333rd Field Artillery Regiment was originally constituted in the National Army on 5 August 1917 and assigned to the 86th Division. The regiment, less the 2nd Battalion, was organized from 25 to 29 August 1917 at Camp Grant, Illinois, while the 2nd Battalion was organized in September 1917 at Camp Grant.

=== Interwar period ===
The regiment arrived at the port of New York in January and February 1919 on various vessels and was demobilized on 23 January 1919 at Camp Grant. Pursuant to the National Defense Act of 1920 it was reconstituted in the Organized Reserve on 13 September 1929, assigned to the 86th Division, and allotted to the Sixth Corps Area. It was relieved from the 86th Division on 5 October 1929 and assigned to the 185th Field Artillery Brigade, XVI Corps. It was initiated (activated) in December 1930 with the entire regiment at Chicago, and was inactivated on 2 October 1937 by relief of personnel. The regiment conducted summer training at Camp McCoy, Wisconsin, and the primary ROTC "feeder" school for new Reserve lieutenants for the regiment was the University of Chicago.

=== World War II ===
The 333rd Field Artillery Regiment, Organized Reserve, was disbanded on 22 August 1942 in an inactive status. It was reconstituted in the Regular Army on 13 October 1942 and was concurrently consolidated with the 333rd Field Artillery, which had been earlier constituted 5 May 1942 in the Regular Army and activated on 5 August 1942 at Camp Gruber, Oklahoma. The regiment was broken up on 12 February 1943, with the Headquarters and Headquarters Battery reorganized and redesignated as the Headquarters and Headquarters Battery, 333rd Field Artillery Group, the 1st Battalion as the 333rd Field Artillery Battalion, and the 2nd Battalion as the 969th Field Artillery Battalion.

The Headquarters and Headquarters Battery, 333rd Field Artillery Group was inactivated on 30 December 1945 at the Hampton Roads Port of Embarkation, Virginia, the 333rd Field Artillery Battalion was disbanded on 10 June 1945 in Germany, and the 969th Field Artillery Battalion was inactivated on 15 April 1946 at the New York Port of Embarkation.

=== Cold War ===
==== 333rd Field Artillery Battalion ====
The 333rd Field Artillery Battalion was reconstituted on 27 November 1946 in the Organized Reserve, redesignated as the 446th Field Artillery Battalion, and activated on 15 February 1947 at Birmingham, Alabama. The Organized Reserve was redesignated on 25 March 1948 as the Organized Reserve Corps, and redesignated on 9 July 1952 as the Army Reserve. The location of the battalion headquarters was changed on 22 March 1949 to Dothan, Alabama; on 1 February 1951 to Bartow, Florida; and on 18 December 1952 to Lakeland, Florida. The Battalion was inactivated on 25 June 1959 at Lakeland and concurrently withdrawn from the Army Reserve and allotted to the Regular Army.

==== 969th Field Artillery Battalion ====
The 969th Field Artillery Battalion was activated on 17 June 1946 at Fort Sill, Oklahoma, and inactivated on 15 June 1949. It was activated on 18 March 1955 in Korea, and inactivated on 25 June 1958.

==== 333rd Field Artillery Regiment ====
The Headquarters and Headquarters Battery, 333rd Field Artillery Group, and the 446th and 969th Field Artillery Battalions were consolidated, reorganized, and redesignated on 1 July 1959 as the 333rd Artillery, a parent regiment under the Combat Arms Regimental System. Redesignated 1 September 1971 as the 333rd Field Artillery. It was withdrawn on 16 August 1987 from the Combat Arms Regimental System and reorganized under the United States Army Regimental System.

==== Modern ====
No regimental elements are currently active.

== Campaigns ==
- World War I: Streamer without inscription.
- World War II: Normandy, Northern France, Rhineland, Ardennes-Alsace, Central Europe.
- Southwest Asia: Defense of Saudi Arabia, Liberation and Defense of Kuwait, Cease-Fire.

== Distinctive unit insignia ==
- Description:

A Gold color metal and enamel device 1 1/8 inches (2.9 cm) in height overall consisting of a shield blazoned: Gules, three pallets Or, each charged with a like number of projectiles, palewise of the first, on a chief of the last, a fleur-de-lis of the first. Attached below and to the sides of the shield is a Gold scroll inscribed "THREE ROUNDS" in Black letters.

- Symbolism:

In the scarlet and gold of the Field Artillery, the functions of the organization are illustrated by the stream of projectiles, and even grouping indicates the ability of the Regiment to perform within narrow limits and that the honors of the Regiment mount with each action. The numerical designation is indicated by the three shells on each of three vertical pales; the service in France in World War I being symbolized by the fleur-de-lis.

- Background:

The distinctive unit insignia was originally approved for the 333d Field Artillery Regiment on 28 November 1942. It was redesignated for the 333d Field Artillery Battalion on 10 November 1943. It was redesignated for the 446th Field Artillery Battalion on 4 March 1947. It was redesignated for the 333d Artillery Regiment on 26 May 1960. Effective 1 September 1971, the insignia was redesignated for the 333d Field Artillery Regiment.

== Coat of arms ==
- Blazon
- Shield:

Gules, three pallets Or, each charged with a like number of projectiles, palewise of the first, on a chief of the last, a fleur-de-lis of the first.

- Crest:

On a wreath Or and Gules, a demi-lion rampant Sable armed and langued Azure bearing on the shoulder an escutcheon parti per pale of the second and fourth within a border Argent and grasping a sword-breaker with five barbs Gold. Motto THREE ROUNDS.

=== Symbolism ===
- Shield:

In the scarlet and gold of the Field Artillery, the functions of the organization are illustrated by the stream of projectiles, and even grouping indicates the ability of the Regiment to perform within narrow limits and that the honors of the Regiment mount with each action. The numerical designation is indicated by the three shells on each of three vertical pales; the service in France in World War I being symbolized by the fleur-de-lis.

- Crest:

The lion, from the arms of Belgium, bearing the red and blue shield from the arms of Bastogne, commemorates the action for which Regiment was awarded the Distinguished Unit Citation embroidered "Bastogne." The white border around the shield represents the encirclement of that city by the enemy and also refers to the snow-covered terrain of the "Battle of the Bulge." The "sword-breaker" was a medieval weapon with barbs or teeth which admitted the sword but prevented its withdrawal. It represents the breaking of the military power of the enemy in Europe. The five barbs stand for the unit's participation in five European campaigns in World War II.

- Background:

The coat of arms was originally approved for the 333d Field Artillery Regiment on 28 November 1942. It was redesignated for the 333d Field Artillery Battalion on 9 November 1943. It was redesignated for the 446th Field Artillery Battalion on 13 January 1947. It was redesignated for the 333d Artillery Regiment and amended to delete the Army Reserve crest on 26 May 1960. The insignia was amended to add a crest on 30 March 1966. Effective 1 September 1971, the insignia was redesignated for the 333d Field Artillery Regiment.

== Decorations ==
- Presidential Unit Citation (Army) for: BASTOGNE
- Meritorious Unit Commendation (Army) for: SOUTHWEST ASIA 1990–1991
- Belgian Croix de Guerre 1940 with Palm for: BASTOGNE
- Cited in the "Order of the Day" of the Belgian Army for action at Bastogne.
