= David Fagen =

American defector

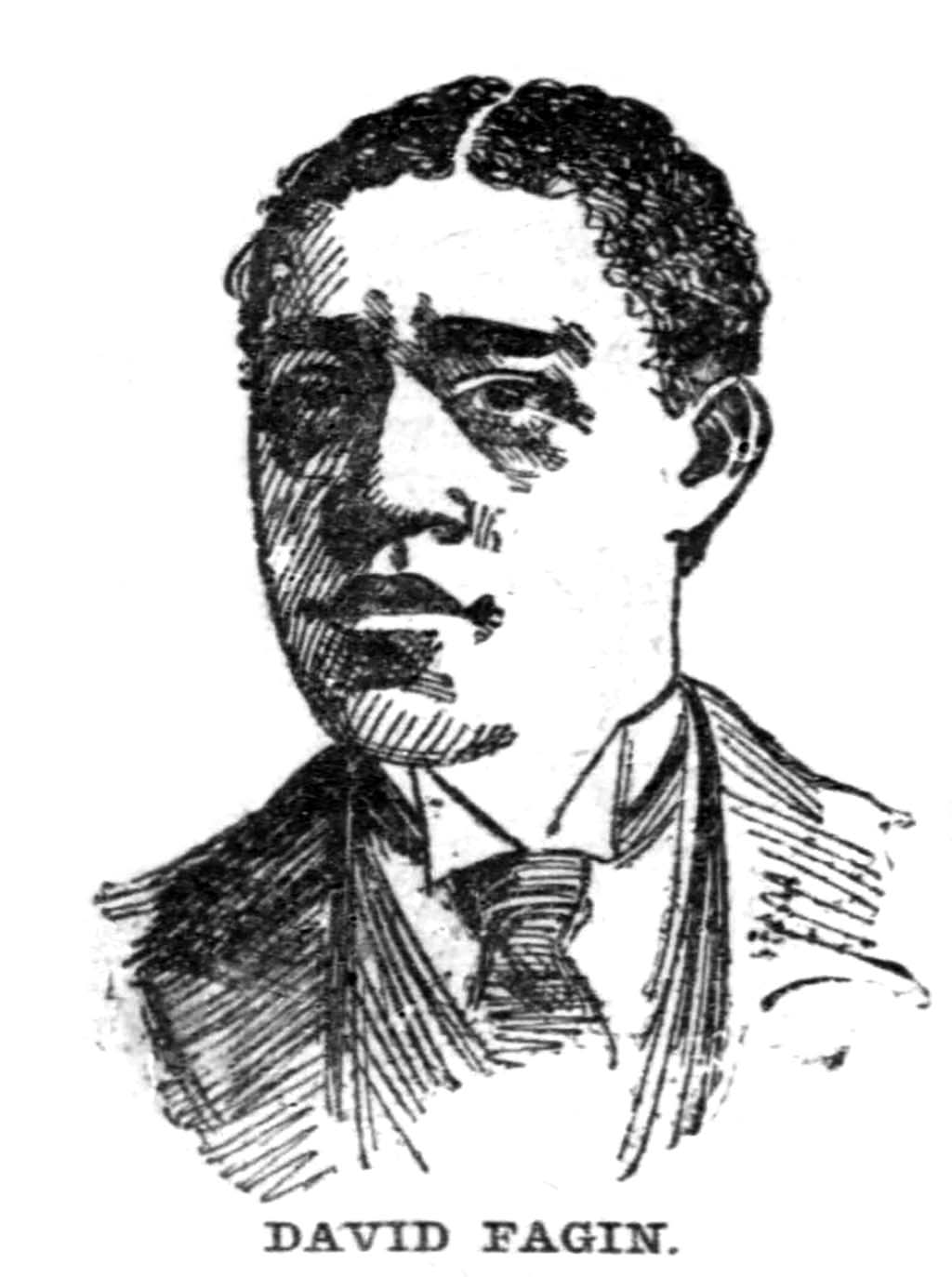
- Born: 1875; Tampa, Florida, U.S.
- Died: Unknown date
- Military career
- Allegiance: United States; Philippines
- Branch: United States Army (until 1899); Philippine Republican Army (1899–1901)
- Rank: Corporal (U.S.); Captain (Philippines)
- Unit: 24th Infantry Regiment (until November 1899)
- Conflicts: Philippine–American War

David Fagen or David Fagin (1875–?) was an African-American soldier who defected during the Philippine–American War. He acquired the rank of captain in the Philippine Republican Army.

== Early life ==
A native of Tampa, Florida, Fagen's mother, Sylvia, died in 1883. Conflicting accounts exist regarding his father, Sam, though he was likely a laborer. Marrying Maggie Washington at age 19, they moved into the so-called "Scrub" slum, and Fagen would work for the Hull Phosphate Company dredging up phosphate rock from riverbeds. Shifts were 10 hours a day for a pay of $1. Conditions for the company's laborers at the time, which sometimes included leased convicts, were poor. This experience left him toughened and scarred in multiple places.

== Service ==
Fagen served in the 24th Regiment of the U.S. Army, lying about his marital status to enlist. He was sent off to war just before the 1898 Tampa riot. After some time deployed in Cuba, where he contracted Yellow Fever caring for allied casualties in a fever camp, he returned to Fort Douglas, where he attended post school before being discharged with a 'good' rating.

However, upon returning home, he discovered his father had passed away while he was gone, and that his wife had started a family with another man in their old house. This prompted Fagen to reenlist in the same regiment of Buffalo Soldiers.

Fagen chafed under Company I's Lieutenant James Alfred Moss, who repeatedly fined Fagen for multiple offenses, the nature of which were often unlisted in army records. Fagen requested to be transferred to a different unit multiple times and was denied each time.

His defection was likely a reaction to racist treatment of African-American soldiers within the United States armed forces at the time, as well as racist sentiments expressed towards the Filipino resistance, who were frequently referred to by American soldiers as "niggers" and "gugus".

By contrast, the native Filipinos generally got along well with the African-American soldiers. There is also the chance Fagen had read signposts written specifically for the 24th by the Philippine revolutionaries which encouraged defection and cited multiple prominent lynchings of the time.

On November 17, 1899, he defected to the Filipino army, taking with him a number of revolvers. His exact reasoning is debated, likely a mix of general exhaustion, conscious political action, and newfound love for a local young woman he met in San Isidro. Regardless, he soon became a guerrilla leader.

The first mention of Fagen in U.S. army reports after this was on March 20, 1900, where Major Joe Wheeler Jr. indicates he was sighted fighting with the forces of Colonel Padilla. There, Fagen taught marksmanship and tactics to the insurgents. He regularly taunted his former unit with his presence before slipping away unscathed, and the American forces kept his actions a secret from the public for as long as they were able to avoid negative press. Still, fear of his actions inspiring further desertions was high, and as a result, relations between white and black enlisted men in the Philippines soured further.

Fagen was frequently hunted by Frederick Funston, who placed high importance on his capture, as Fagen inspired a marked increase in guerrilla recruitment, though personal hatred was also a factor. Funston would order the companies under his command to burn down villages among other war crimes in order to flush him out, as reported in the New York World, and Funston tormented his black soldiers.

When Fagen's forces achieved victories in battles or supply raids, American prisoners were frequently taken. The testimony of those eventually released in prisoner exchanges, including Lieutenant Frederick W. Alstaetter, indicated they were treated with "reserved affability" and "the very best he could under the circumstances". Alstaetter also spoke with Fagen, who vowed that he would never be captured alive. When General José Alejandrino later surrendered, Fagen did not do so with him, instead retreating with his new common law wife in tow.

After two other black deserters were captured and executed, President Theodore Roosevelt announced he would stop executing captured deserters.

== Supposed death ==
As the war ended, the US gave amnesties to most of their opponents. A substantial reward was offered for Fagen, who was considered a traitor. There are multiple conflicting versions of his fate: one is that his was the partially decomposed head for which the reward was claimed, presented along with a number of his personal effects. This version is disputed due to the lack of Fagen's identifiable facial scars on the head, and the account of a former member of the 25th infantry regiment who later housed him briefly in Manila. According to Fagen's biographer, Michael Morey, Fagen was killed in the summer of 1906 by scouts in Nueva Ecija. Another version is supported by Major Edwin Price Ramsey, who fought the Japanese in the Philippines during World War II. Ramsey met a man in the jungles of Mindoro who matched Fagen's age and description, introducing himself under a false name. This man had married multiple times and lived peacefully in the mountains.

== Media portrayals ==
- Portrayed by Quester Hannah, an American theater actor, in the 2013 indie film, David F.
