= 333rd Field Artillery Battalion (United States) =

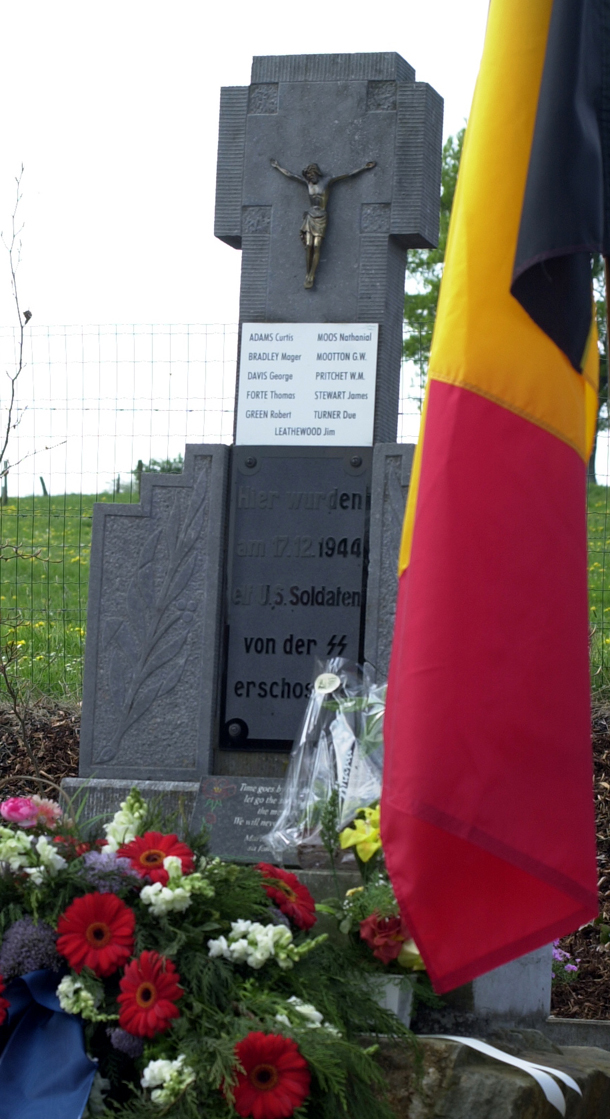
- Memorial to the Wereth 11
- Active: 9 March 1943–10 June 1945
- Allegiance: United States
- Branch: United States Army
- Type: Field artillery
- Size: Battalion
- Motto: Three Rounds
- Colors: Red
- Engagements: World War II; Normandy; Northern France; Rhineland; Ardennes-Alsace; Central Europe

The 333rd Field Artillery Battalion was a United States Army unit of racially segregated African-American troops during World War II.

The unit landed at Normandy in early July 1944 and saw continuous combat as corps artillery throughout the summer. In October 1944, it was sent to Schoenberg, Belgium, as part of the U.S. VIII Corps. At the onset of the Battle of the Bulge on 17 December 1944, the unit was overrun by German troops. While most of the 333rd FA Battalion withdrew west towards Bastogne, in advance of the German assault, Service and C Batteries remained behind to cover the advance of the 106th Infantry Division. The unit suffered heavy casualties, including 11 men of the 333rd who were massacred near the Belgian hamlet of Wereth.

After the war, the battalion was deactivated and reactivated during various Army reorganizations, finally reemerging with its lineage part of the 333rd Field Artillery Regiment.

== World War I and interwar period ==
The 333rd Field Artillery Regiment was formed on 5 August 1917 and assigned to the 161st Field Artillery Brigade, 86th Division. The regiment was sent to France but did not see action. In January and February 1919, the regiment returned to the United States and was demobilized at Camp Grant, Illinois. It was reconstituted in the Organized Reserve on 13 September 1929, assigned to the 86th Division, and allotted to the Sixth Corps Area.

On 5 October 1929, it was relieved from assignment to the 86th Division and assigned to the XVI Corps. The entire regiment was initiated at Chicago, Illinois, in December 1930. The primary ROTC "feeder school" was the University of Chicago, and the regiment usually conducted summer training at Camp McCoy, Wisconsin. It was inactivated by relief of Reserve personnel on 2 October 1937.

== World War II ==
As was typical of segregated units in World War II, white officers commanded black enlisted men. On 5 August 1942, the 333rd Field Artillery Regiment was activated as a colored (segregated) unit at Camp Gruber, Oklahoma, and assigned to the U.S. Third Army. As part of an Army-wide reorganization that eliminated regiments in all arms except the infantry in favor of the more flexible "group" concept, on 10 March 1943, the Headquarters and Headquarters Battery (HHB) of the 333rd was redesigned the HHB of the 333rd Field Artillery Group, the 1st Battalion became the 333rd Field Artillery Battalion, and the 2nd Battalion became the 969th Field Artillery Battalion.

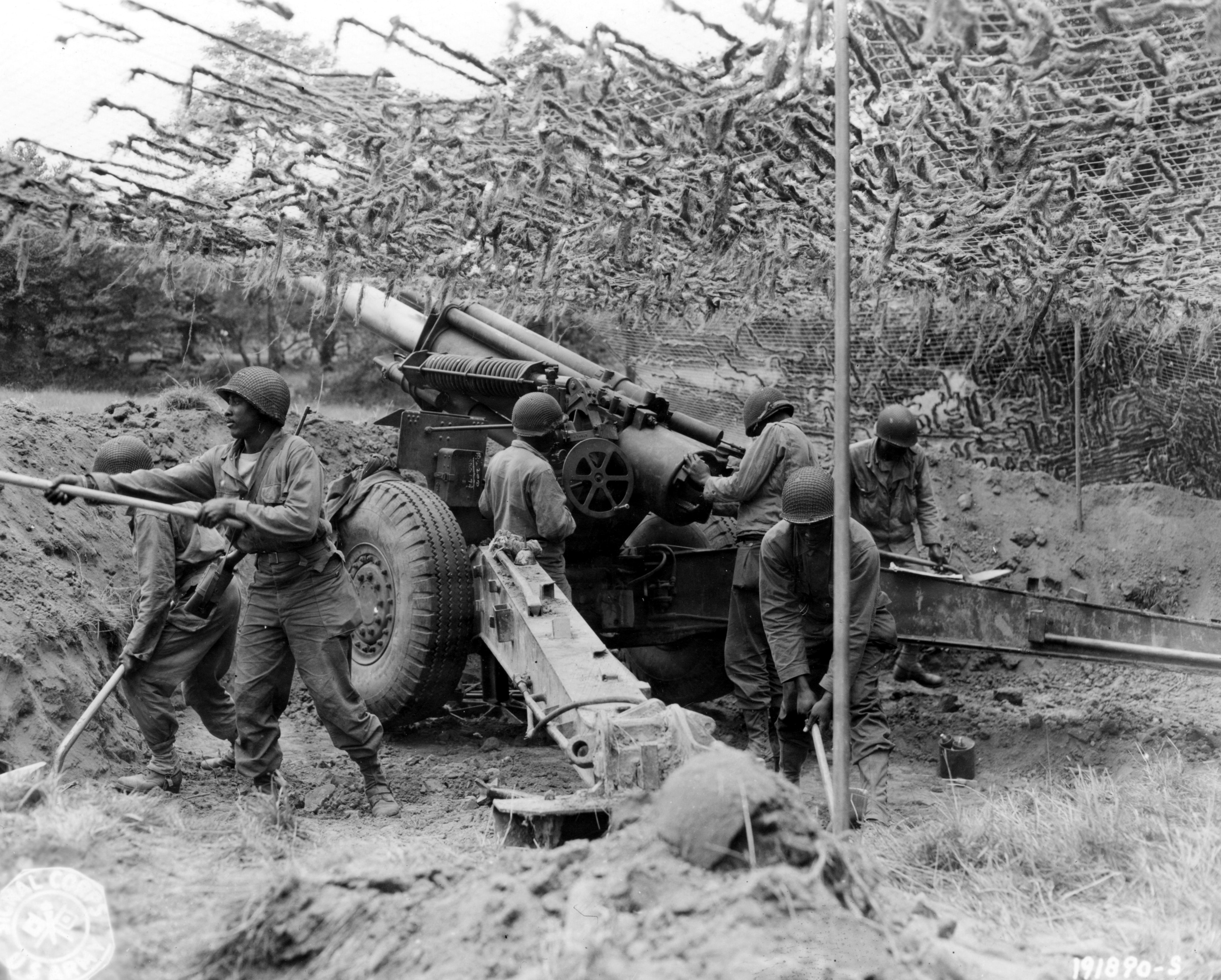
Soldiers of the 333rd Field Artillery Battalion in the Périers sector in Normandy

The 333rd Field Artillery Battalion landed at Normandy in early July 1944. The unit was sent to Brittany, where it participated in the siege of Brest in August and September, then battled across northern France before arriving in the Ardennes sector as part of the corps artillery of the U.S. VIII Corps.

=== Ardennes Offensive ===
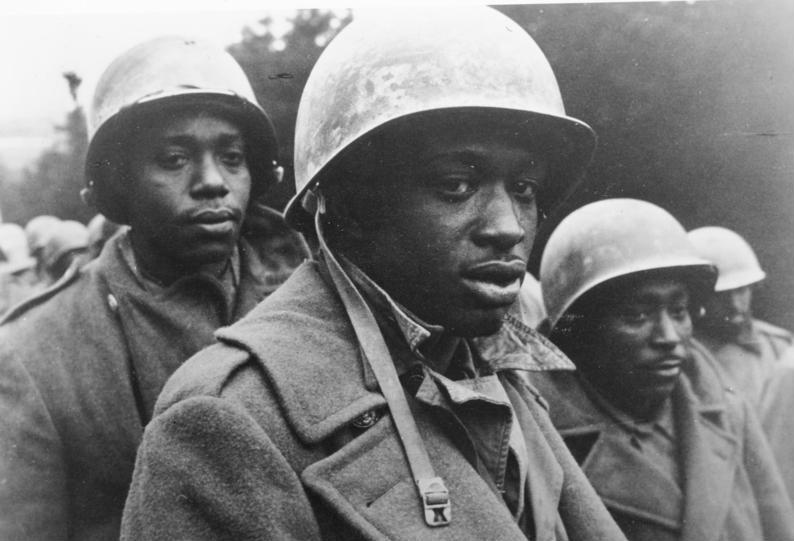
Members of the 333rd FA Battalion as POWs December 1944

The unit arrived in the small village of Schönberg, near St. Vith, Belgium, in October. The Service Battery was situated west of the Our River while Batteries A, B, and C were located on the east side of the river to support the VII Corps. The 333rd Field Artillery Group and the 969th were equipped with 155mm howitzers, and the 771st Field Artillery Battalion was equipped with 4.5-inch guns. They initially supported the 2nd Infantry Division and its replacement, the 106th Infantry Division.

At the onset of the Battle of the Bulge, the unit was about 11 miles (18 km) behind the front lines. In the early morning hours of 16 December, German artillery began shelling the Schönberg area. By the afternoon, there were reports of rapid German infantry and armored progress. The 333rd Field Artillery Battalion was ordered to displace further west, but the 106th Infantry Division artillery commander requested that Battery C and Service Battery remain in position to support the 14th Cavalry Regiment and 106th Division.

By the morning of 17 December, the Germans had captured Schönberg and controlled the bridge across the river that connected to St. Vith. Service Battery tried to displace to St. Vith through the village, and was hit by heavy German armored vehicle and small arms fire. Many men were killed, and those that remained were captured. As the men were being herded to the rear, the column was attacked by an American aircraft. By the end of the day, the battalion had only five howitzers left, the rest having been abandoned in the retreat. The survivors of the 333rd Field Artillery Battalion were ordered to Bastogne, where they were incorporated into the 969th Field Artillery Battalion. Both battalions had provided fire support for the 101st Airborne Division during the Siege of Bastogne, for which they received the Presidential Unit Citation, the Army's highest unit award.

=== Wereth 11 massacre ===
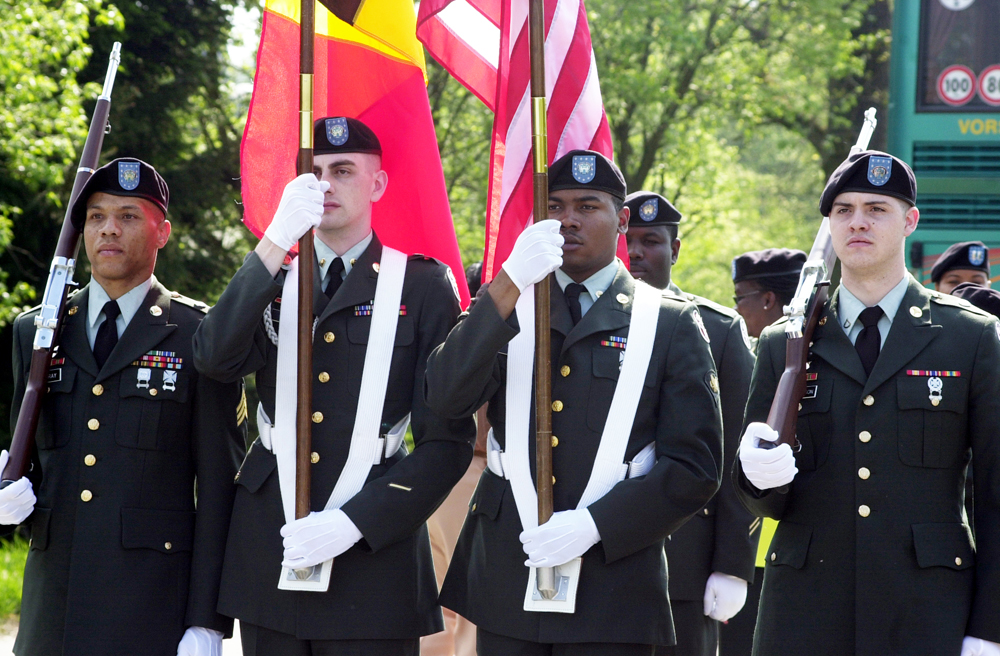
Honor guard for the Wereth 11 in 2007.

50°20′55.14″N 6°13′55.37″E

During the ensuing confusion, 11 men escaped into the woods. They were by this time on the east side of the river, and had to sneak their way overland in a northwesterly direction, hoping they would reach American lines. At about 3:00 p.m., they approached the first house in the nine-house hamlet of Wereth, Belgium, owned by Mathias Langer. A friend of the Langers was also present. Langer offered them shelter. The area they were in had been part of Germany for hundreds of years, until it was annexed by Belgium after World War I, and three of the nine families in the village were known to be still loyal to Germany. The wife of a German soldier who lived in Wereth told members of the notorious 1st SS Panzer Division deployed in the area that black American soldiers were hiding in her village. The SS troops quickly moved to capture the Americans, who surrendered without resistance. The SS men then marched their prisoners to a nearby field, where they were beaten, tortured, and finally shot. As prisoners of war, the captured American soldiers were hors de combat and thus should have been protected under the terms of the Geneva Conventions, of which Germany was a signatory. Therefore, this maltreatment followed by summary execution was a war crime.

The frozen bodies of the victims were discovered six weeks later, when the Allies re-captured the area. The SS troops had battered the black soldiers' faces, broken their legs with rifle butts, cut off some of their fingers, stabbed some with bayonets, and had shot at least one soldier while he was bandaging a comrade's wounds.

Current research shows that the SS men responsible for the massacre were from a scouting party of Schnelle Gruppe Knittel, a unit commanded by Sturmbannführer Gustav Knittel. In 1946, Knittel was sentenced to life imprisonment at the Malmedy massacre trial for ordering illegal executions of several American prisoners of war during the Battle of the Bulge. Due to irregularities at his trial and with his confession, his sentence was later reduced to 15 years, then to 12 years. Knittel was released from prison in December 1953, and died of health problems in 1976.

==== Names ====
The troops killed were:

Rank	Name	From	Service number	Buried	Awards
Staff sergeant (mess sergeant)	Forte, Thomas J.	Jackson, Mississippi	34046992	Henri-Chapelle plot C, row 11, grave 55.	Purple Heart
Technician fourth grade	Pritchett, William Edward	Camden, Alabama	34552760	McCaskill Cemetery, Wilcox County, Alabama	Purple Heart
Technician fourth grade	Stewart, James Aubrey	Piedmont, West Virginia	35744547	Henri-Chapelle, plot C, row 11, grave 2	Purple Heart
Corporal	Bradley, Mager	Bolivar County, Mississippi	34046336	Fort Gibson National Cemetery, Fort Gibson, Oklahoma, plot 6, 0, 2698-E	Purple Heart
Private first class	Davis, George	Jefferson County, Alabama	34553436	Henri-Chapelle, plot D, row 10, grave 61	Purple Heart
Private first class	Leatherwood, James Lee	Pontotoc, Mississippi	34481753	College Hill Cemetery, Pontotoc County, Mississippi, Plot C Row 9 Grave 57	Purple Heart
Private first class	Moten, George Washington	Hopkins County, Texas	38304695	Henri-Chapelle, plot E, row 10, grave 29	Purple Heart
Private first class	Turner, Due William	Emerson, Arkansas	38383369	Henri-Chapelle, plot F, row 5, grave 9	Purple Heart
Private (medic)	Adams, Curtis	South Carolina	34511454	Henri-Chapelle, plot C, row 11, grave 41	Purple Heart
Technician fifth grade	Green, Robert Leroy	Upson County, Georgia	34552457	Highland Park Cemetery, Highland Hills, Ohio, Section 3, Lot 3, Tier 24, Grave 22	Purple Heart
Private	Moss, Nathaniel	Longview, Texas	38040062	Henri-Chapelle, plot F, row 10, grave 8	Purple Heart

==== Memorials ====
On 11 September 1994, Hermann Langer, son of farmer Mattias Langer who had attempted to help the soldiers, erected a small stone cross to remember the 11 murdered men. On 23 May 2004, a new memorial was built on the site of the executions and was dedicated to the 11 troops as well as all the African-American soldiers who had fought in the European theater. It is believed to be the only memorial specifically dedicated to African-American soldiers of World War II in Europe.

In 2006, members of the Worcester, Massachusetts, chapter of Veterans of the Battle of the Bulge dedicated the first memorial to the Wereth 11 on United States soil. It was dedicated at the Winchendon Veterans' Memorial Cemetery on 20 August.

In 2016, a memorial was erected in Miller Park, Bloomington, Illinois. Each soldier is named.

=== End of the war ===
Because it had been overrun, the 333rd Field Artillery Battalion suffered more casualties during the Battle of the Bulge than any other artillery unit in the VIII Corps. Six officers, including the battalion commander, and 222 enlisted men had been either killed or become prisoners of war. Nine howitzers, thirty-four trucks, and twelve weapons carriers were lost. The 286 men that remained in the battalion were mostly reassigned to the 578th and 969th Field Artillery Battalions. The battalion was originally scheduled to be disbanded because of the heavy losses it had suffered and the difficulty in obtaining replacements, but in the interim, the few men remaining in the skeletonized battalion performed guard and labor duties. Sufficient replacements did not arrive to reconstitute the 333rd Field Artillery Battalion until April 1945.

The 333rd Field Artillery Group served in the Rhineland and Central Europe campaign to the end of the war.

== After World War II ==
The 333rd Field Artillery Battalion was inactivated on 10 June 1945 in Germany, while the 333rd Field Artillery Group was inactivated at Camp Patrick Henry, Virginia, on 30 December 1945. Both the 333rd and 969th Field Artillery Battalions were later reactivated, although further reorganizations ensued, with the 333rd Field Artillery Battalion renumbered as the 446th Field Artillery Battalion. On 1 July 1959, the 333rd Field Artillery Group was reactivated as the 333rd Field Artillery Regiment, with the 446th and 969th Field Artillery Battalions subordinated to it.

On 1 September 1971, the regiment was retitled the 333rd Field Artillery Regiment. Four target acquisition batteries of the 333rd Field Artillery served in Operation Desert Storm in 1991. Today, there is only one target acquisition battery in the Army that still bears the number of the 333rd Field Artillery: F TAB, 333rd FAR is stationed at Camp Casey in South Korea, as part of the 210th Field Artillery Brigade.
