= James Megellas =

United States Army lieutenant colonel

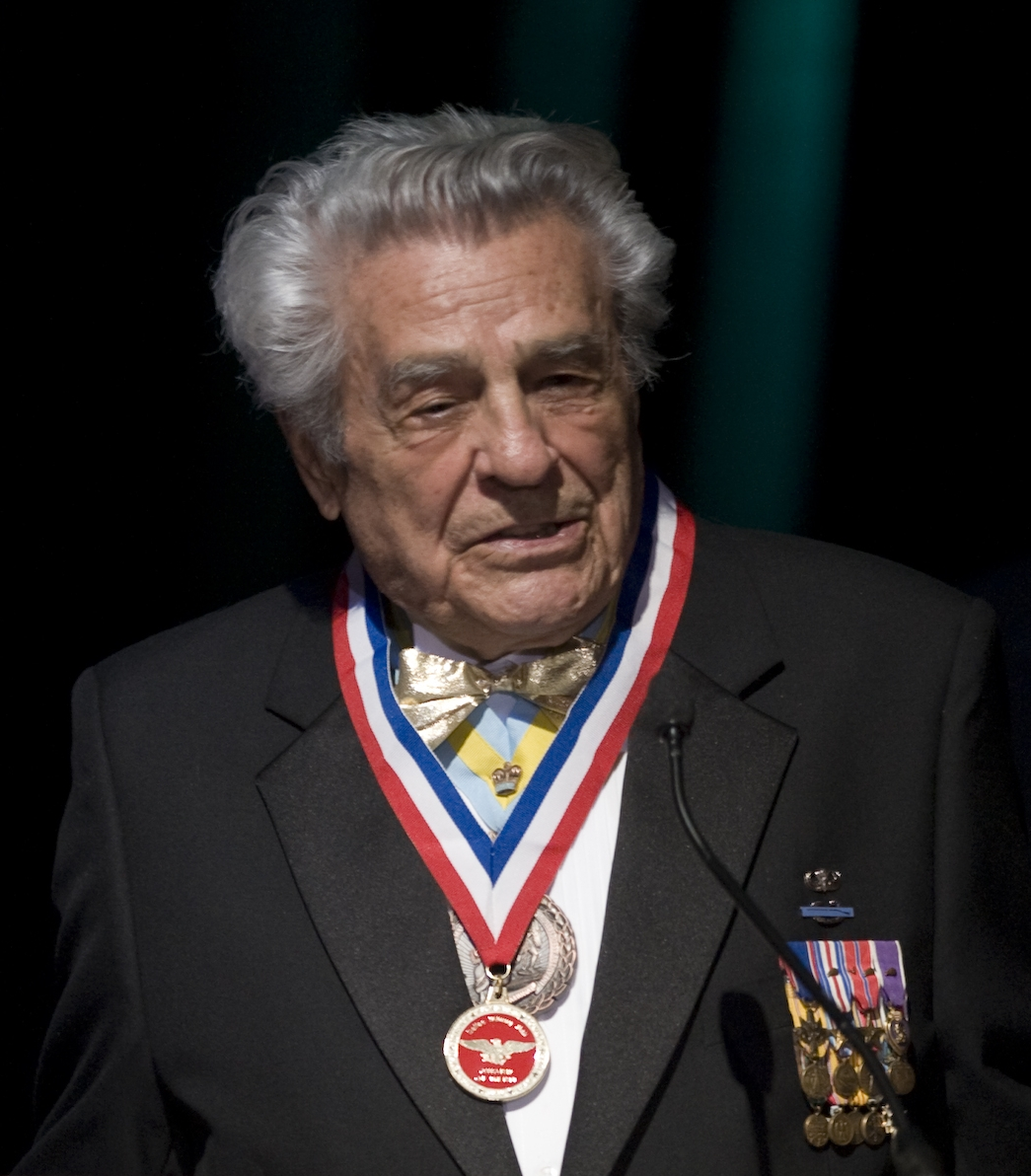
- James Megellas in 2009
- Born: March 11, 1917; Fond du Lac, Wisconsin, U.S.
- Died: April 2, 2020 (aged 103); Colleyville, Texas, U.S.
- Military career
- Allegiance: United States of America
- Branch: United States Army
- Service years: 1942–1962
- Rank: Lieutenant colonel
- Nickname: Maggie
- Units: H Company, 3rd Battalion, 504th Parachute Infantry Regiment, 82nd Airborne Division
- Conflicts: World War II • Operation Shingle • Operation Market Garden • Battle of the Bulge
- Awards: Distinguished Service Cross; Silver Star (2); Bronze Star (2) with "V"; Purple Heart (2)

James "Maggie" Megellas (March 11, 1917 – April 2, 2020) was a United States Army lieutenant colonel. During World War II, he was a rifle company platoon leader and is considered to be one of the most decorated combat officers in the history of the 82nd Airborne Division. He received the Distinguished Service Cross for extraordinary heroism and three other decorations for valor. On May 2, 1945, at the close of the war in Europe, Megellas and his platoon were the first to liberate Wobbelin Concentration Camp.

In his hometown of Fond du Lac, Wisconsin, a park, post office, and veterans' building was named after him.

== Early life ==
Megellas was born in Fond du Lac, Wisconsin on March 11, 1917, the son of a Greek-American family and attended Ripon College in the nearby city of Ripon. The attack on Pearl Harbor occurred midway through his senior year. He participated in the school's Reserve Officers' Training Corps program and, upon graduation in May 1942, received a commission as a second lieutenant in the U.S. Army.

== World War II ==
Megellas was originally assigned to the Signal Corps, but grew tired of the required additional schooling and volunteered to become a paratrooper in order to see combat. He was assigned to H Company, 3rd Battalion, 504th Parachute Infantry Regiment, 82nd Airborne Division. He first experienced combat in the mountains outside Naples, Italy, near Venafro, where he was wounded and hospitalized. In October 1943, while the remainder of the 82nd Airborne departed Italy to recoup before the invasion of Normandy, the 504th PIR remained behind and took part in Operation Shingle. On January 22, 1944, the 504th took part in an amphibious assault at Anzio. The fighting took a heavy toll, Megellas being wounded again. It was not until April before the regiment was withdrawn. Due to the losses at Anzio, the 504th did not participate in the D-Day Normandy Landings. They did, however, parachute into the Netherlands as part of Operation Market Garden, the airborne invasion of that country.

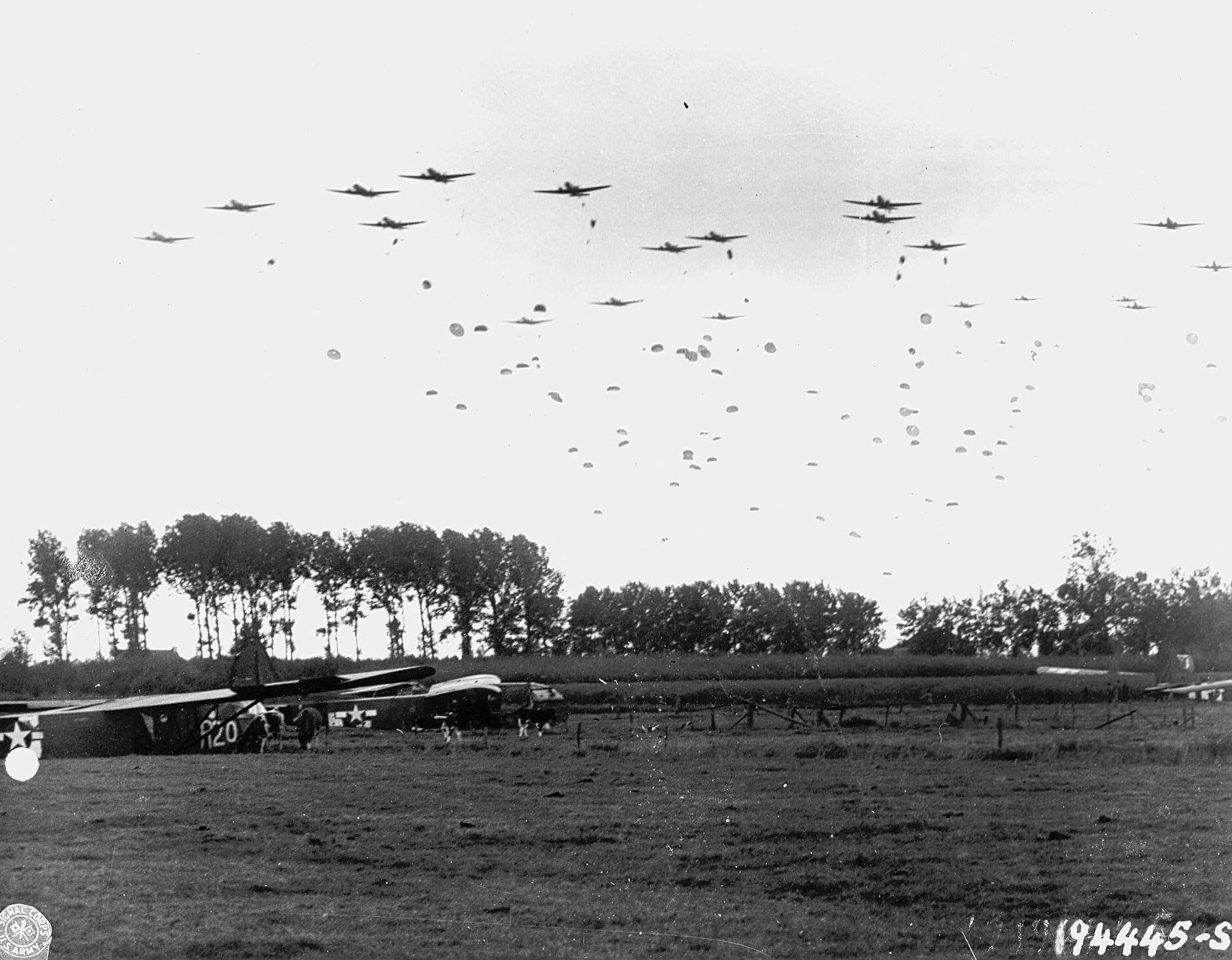
The 82nd Airborne Division drops near Grave (National Archives)

Megellas took part in the crossing of the Waal River near Nijmegen, where the American forces crossed the river in flimsy boats while under heavy machine gun fire. On September 30, in Holland, Megellas single-handedly attacked a German observation post and machine gun nest. For displaying extraordinary heroism that day, he was awarded the U.S. military's second-highest decoration, the Distinguished Service Cross. On December 20, for defeating the enemy at the base of a hill and rescuing one of his wounded men near Cheneux, Belgium, Megellas was awarded the Silver Star.

In late December, the regiment was rushed into the Battle of the Bulge. On January 28, 1945, Megellas' platoon was advancing towards Herresbach, Belgium. Struggling through heavy snow and freezing cold, they surprised 200 Germans who were advancing out of the town. Catching the Germans largely off-guard, the attack proved to be devastating, with the Americans killing and capturing a large number and causing many others to flee. As they prepared to assault the town, however, a German Mark V tank took aim at them. Megellas ran towards it, and disabled it with a single grenade. Climbing on top of it, he then dropped another grenade into the tank, eliminating the threat to his men. He then led his men as they cleared and seized the town, and not one of his men was killed or injured. Although he was recommended for the Medal of Honor shortly afterward, he received the Silver Star (the German tank incident was not mentioned in his award citation). He was already highly decorated at the end of World War II when General James Gavin, the commander of the 82nd Airborne Division, selected him to be the representative when the Netherlands wished to bestow their nation’s highest honor, the Orange Lanyard of the Military Order of William, as a unit award for the valiant efforts of the entire division in their liberation during Operation Market Garden. At the end of the war, Megellas and his platoon first to liberate Wobbelin Concentration Camp On May 2, 1945. Later in life, Maggie reflected, “I was not prepared mentally to deal with the horror of the camp… it was not until our men witnessed this that we fully realized what we had been fighting for. The destruction of the monstrosity the Nazis had created was the cause greater than ourselves that we had often alluded to but never fully understood. It was a defining moment in our lives: who we were, what we believed in, and what we stood for.”

Throughout the war, Megellas served with Company H, 504 PIR, which he would later come to command. In January 1946, he led his rifle company down Fifth Avenue in New York City in the Victory Parade.

== Post-war life ==
In 1946, Megellas left the active Army with the rank of captain and served for a further 16 years in the Army Reserve. He retired as a lieutenant colonel. He served with the United States Agency for International Development (USAID) from 1946 to 1978 and served two tours in the Vietnam War. He wrote a memoir of his wartime experiences entitled All the Way to Berlin: A Paratrooper at War in Europe (2003). Megellas made an unsuccessful run as a Democrat against William Van Pelt to represent Wisconsin's 6th District in 1958 and 1960, and he served on the Fond du Lac city council until 1961.

In May 1962, Megellas married the love of his life, former Miss Ripon 1960, Carole Margaret Laehn of Fond du Lac, an accomplished pianist who was a contestant in the 1960 Miss Wisconsin pageant in Kenosha, Wisconsin. They had two children, James and Stephen, and subsequently four grandchildren. Carole died at age 83 on October 29, 2022, in Texas.

Megellas lived in Colleyville, Texas as of 2009. He turned 100 in March 2017 and died on April 2, 2020, in Colleyville, Texas, just 22 days after his 103rd birthday.

== Media portrayals ==
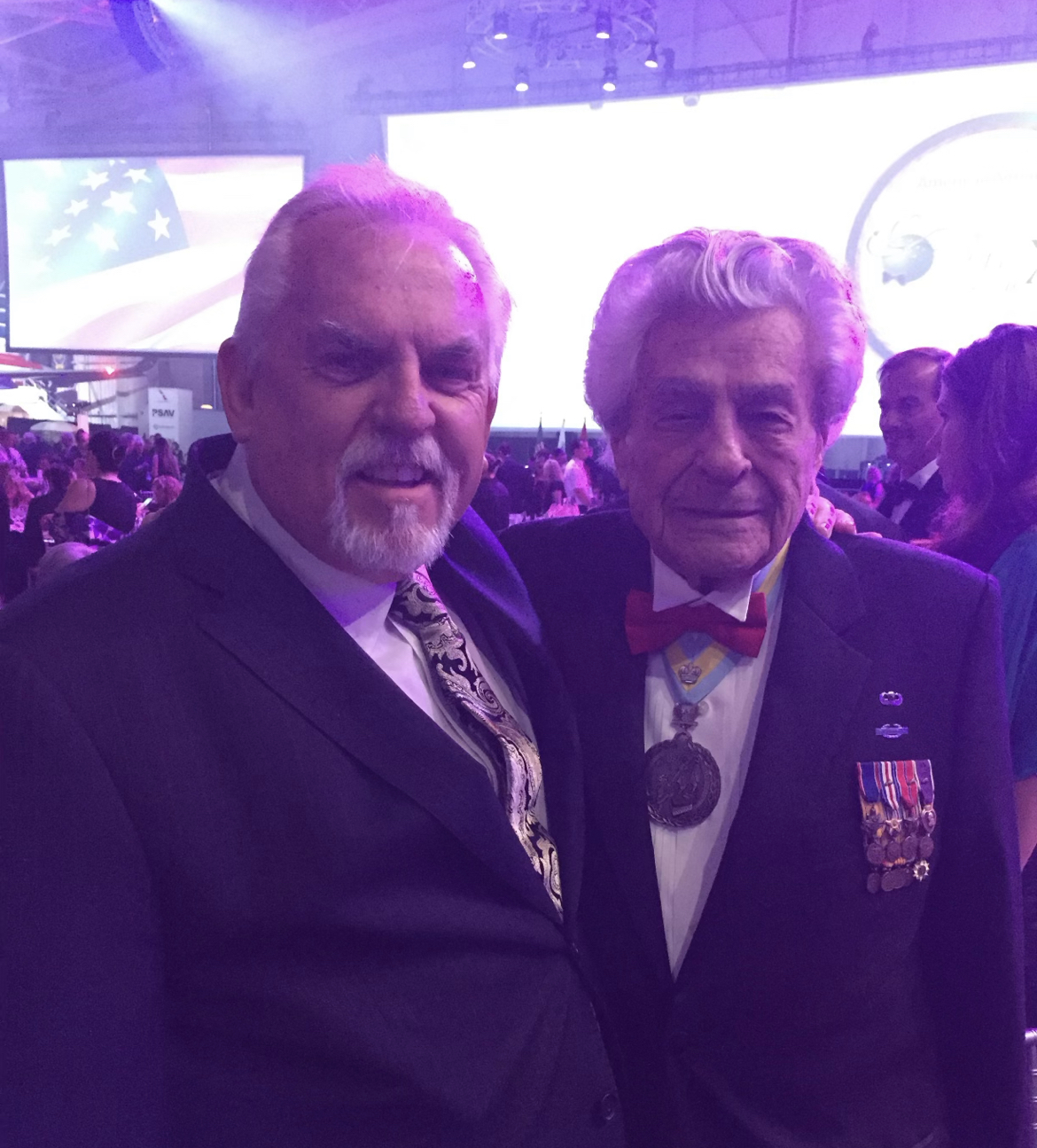
Megellas (left) with John Ratzenberger.

A fictionalized version of Megellas, called 'Lt. Wall', was portrayed by actor John Ratzenberger in the 1977 film A Bridge Too Far, based on Cornelius Ryan's non-fiction book. In the film, Wall dies during the crossing of the Waal.

== Military awards ==
Megellas' military decorations and awards include the following:

Master Parachutist
Combat Infantryman Badge

Distinguished Service Cross
Silver Star with 1 oak leaf cluster
Bronze Star Medal with 1 oak leaf cluster and "V" device
Purple Heart with 1 oak leaf cluster
Presidential Unit Citation with 1 oak leaf cluster
American Campaign Medal
European-African-Middle Eastern Campaign Medal with 1 silver and 1 bronze star
World War II Victory Medal
Army of Occupation Medal
National Defense Service Medal
Vietnam Service Medal with 2 bronze stars
Armed Forces Reserve Medal
Republic of Vietnam Campaign Medal with 1960– device
Belgian fourragère

- Order of Saint Maurice in 2008.
- Dallas Military Ball's Meritorious Service Award in 2009.
- DAR Medal of Honor in 2010.
- He was also the first American to be decorated by the Government of the Netherlands when he was awarded the Military Order of William Orange Lanyard. Selected by General James Gavin as the most outstanding officer of the 82nd Airborne Division, it was presented to him by the Dutch Minister of War in Berlin in 1945.

=== Award Citations ===
Distinguished Service Cross World War II Service: United States Army Rank: First Lieutenant (Infantry) Battalion: 3d Battalion Regiment: 504th Parachute Infantry Regiment Division: 82d Airborne Division Action Date: September 30, 1944

According to Headquarters, XVI Corps, General Orders No. 69 (24 August 1945), the President of the United States, under the authority of the Act of Congress of 9 July 1918, awarded the Distinguished Service Cross to James Megellas (ASN: 0-439607), a First Lieutenant in the United States Army, for extraordinary heroism during military operations against enemy forces in the Netherlands on 30 September 1944. Serving as a platoon leader in Company H, 3rd Battalion, 504th Parachute Infantry Regiment, Megellas led a combat patrol intended to obtain intelligence and capture enemy prisoners. Upon reaching an enemy observation post, Megellas reportedly crawled forward alone and killed two outpost guards as well as the crew of a machine-gun position. He subsequently advanced his patrol to attack the main enemy defences, during which he personally captured three prisoners and killed two additional enemy soldiers. The patrol also attacked and destroyed two blockhouses, actions which significantly disrupted enemy morale in the sector. After completing the mission, Megellas led his platoon through enemy lines while under mortar fire. During the withdrawal, he carried a wounded soldier while simultaneously operating a Thompson submachine gun with one hand. His leadership and actions reportedly enabled the patrol to inflict substantial enemy casualties, secure critical intelligence, and compel German forces to abandon a planned offensive in the area. The citation stated that his conduct reflected credit upon himself, the 82nd Airborne Division, and the United States Army, exemplifying the highest traditions of American military service.

Silver Star World War II Service: United States Army Rank: First Lieutenant (Infantry) Battalion: 3d Battalion Regiment: 504th Parachute Infantry Regiment Division: 82d Airborne Division Action Date: January 28, 1945

The President of the United States of America, authorized by Act of Congress July 9, 1918, takes pleasure in presenting the Silver Star to First Lieutenant (Infantry) James Megellas (ASN:0-439607), United States Army, for gallantry in action while serving with Company H, 3d Battalion, 504th Parachute Infantry Regiment, 82d Airborne Division, in action on 28 January 1945, near Herresbach, Belgium. After breaking a trail across country for twelve hours in deep, dry snow, First Lieutenant Megellas, a platoon leader, was ordered to advance with his platoon and two supporting tanks along the main road leading into Herrebach. About one mile from the town, his platoon was fired upon by about 200 Germans forming a defense. Quickly grasping the situation, he led a frontal attack on the startled enemy who attempted to fight back. First Lieutenant Megellas' direction and leadership of his men was so superb that within ten minutes the entire force of enemy was either killed, captured, or fled into the town. He then reorganized his platoon, and with the two supporting tanks followed the enemy into the town. Braving heavy enemy sniper and rifle fire, he personally took a leading part in flushing the enemy out of their houses, killing eight and capturing five enemy. As a result of First Lieutenant Megellas' fierce leadership and skillful handing of his men, over 100 enemy were killed, 180 captured, and large amounts of valuable equipment fell into our hands. This feat was accomplished without the loss of a single man wounded or killed. First Lieutenant Megellas demonstrated a remarkable degree of tactical skill and a brand of courageous leadership which reflects highly upon himself and the Airborne Forces.

Silver Star World War II Service: United States Army Rank: First Lieutenant (Infantry) Battalion: 3d Battalion Regiment: 504th Parachute Infantry Regiment Division: 82d Airborne Division Action Date: December 20, 1944

Headquarters, 82d Airborne Division, General Orders No. 68 (May 16, 1945) The President of the United States of America, authorized by Act of Congress July 9, 1918, takes pleasure in presenting a Bronze Oak Leaf Cluster in lieu of a Second Award of the Silver Star to First Lieutenant (Infantry) James Megellas (ASN: 0-439607), United States Army, for gallantry in action while serving with Company H, 3d Battalion, 504th Parachute Infantry Regiment, 82d Airborne Division, in action on 20 December 1944, near ******, Belgium. While attacking across the barren crest of a hill toward their ultimate objective, Lieutenant Megellas, with utter disregard for his personal safety, fearlessly charged down the hill toward the enemy, calling for his men to follow him. Reaching a small patch of woods, Lieutenant Megellas sighted a large force of enemy armor and infantry. Lieutenant Megellas opened fire upon its crew, killing all eight. The enemy raked the trees with a curtain of intense fire, wounding one of the men. Lieutenant Megellas fearlessly picked up the wounded man and led his small force to cover, reformed it and led them to seize the objective. Lieutenant Megellas’ initiative and aggressiveness reflect great credit upon himself and the United States Airborne Forces.

=== Proposed Medal of Honor ===
On May 21, 2013, Congressman Tom Petri of Wisconsin introduced H.R.2082 in the United States House of Representatives to request the President award the Medal of Honor (to upgrade his Silver Star to the MOH) to Megellas for his 'above and beyond' heroism on January 28, 1945, during the Battle of the Bulge. Senator John Cornyn also introduced the 'companion bill' S.993 into the U.S. Senate on that date. Both bills remained in committee and expired with the effluxion of the 113th Congress on 3 January 2015. In January 2017, Senate and House bills were again re-introduced. The Senate Bill S.238 was sponsored by U.S. Senator Ron Johnson of Wisconsin. The House bill H.R. 751 was sponsored by 6th Wisconsin District U.S. Representative Glenn Grothman.

== See also ==
- List of Medal of Honor recipients
