= Amblève =

Amblève may refer to:

- Amblève (river) in Belgium
- Amel, a town in Belgium, called Amblève in French
