= 969th Field Artillery Battalion (United States) =

969th Artillery Battalion
- Active: 1942–1945
- Country: United States
- Branch: United States Army
- Role: Artillery
- Equipment: M1 155mm Howitzer
- Engagements: D-Day (Utah Beach) Battle for Brest Battle of Bastogne (Battle of the Bulge)
- Battle honours: Distinguished Unit Citation
- Executive Officer: Maj. Einar Erickson
- First Commander: Lt. Col. Hubert D. Barnes

The 969th Field Artillery Battalion was an African American United States Army field artillery unit that saw combat during World War II. The battalion landed at Utah Beach during Operation Neptune, and participated in the liberation of France and Belgium. Along with survivors of the 333rd Artillery Battalion, it gave fire support to the 101st Airborne Division during the siege of Bastogne. (Battle of the Bulge) Because of the heavy losses suffered by the 333rd, some of its remaining members were reassigned to the 969th Field Artillery Battalion after the Battle of the Bulge.

The 969th was equipped with the M1 155 mm howitzer, the primary medium field howitzer in use by U.S. forces during World War II. The gun crews of the 969th were known for singing in cadence as they loaded and fired their guns, and were praised by many veterans who fought in and around Bastogne, including Donald R. Burgett, for their deadly accuracy and precision.

== Battle of Normandy ==
The 969th landed at Utah Beach on 9 July 1944 under the command of Lieutenant Colonel Hubert D. Barnes. Its primary mission was to reinforce the 8th Infantry Division. It took positions around Lattage du Pont in the vicinity of Le Haye du Puits. After Lieutenant Colonel Barnes was injured in battle on 10 July, the battalion operated under its executive officer Major Einar Erickson. The battalion's role was to support various armored and infantry divisions, including the 8th Infantry Division, the 90th Infantry Division, and the 4th Armored Division.

After fighting around Le Haye du Puits, the 969th moved west towards Rennes, France. The full battalion moved on 1 August, supporting the 4th Armored Division. The battalion served as suppressive and support fire, as Rennes was surrounded by snipers, and was constantly strafed by planes. A sergeant used a .50 caliber machine gun to suppress sniper fire, and the battalion took credit for 70 prisoners in Rennes.

After Rennes, the Battalion, still in support of the 8th Infantry Division, moved even further west, to Brest, France in late August. They remained fighting in Brest until 19 September.

The battalion, again in support of the 8th Infantry Division, moved to Bastogne, Belgium in October 1944, where it was attached to the 174th Field Artillery group.

== Siege of Bastogne ==
The 969th, along with three other VIII Corps African American field artillery units, including the 333rd Field Artillery Group, the 333rd Field Artillery Battalion, and the 578th Field Artillery Battalion, moved to support infantry divisions, including the 106th Infantry Division. The battalions were limited to 250 rounds a day because of limited supplies. The Germans staged an attack on 16 December against the position of VIII Corp's 333rd Field Artillery Group in Bleialf. This ambush proved deadly to the 333rd Field Artillery Group, and because of need of support in the 333rd Field Artillery Battalion, on 18 December the 969th was assigned to the 333rd by verbal order (Wereth 11 Massacre). After, the Axis again surrounded the VIII Corps and was penetrating American forces quickly. The 969th was among the first groups to receive small arms fire, forcing them to move positions. The 333rd's harrowing losses during this ambush pushed those remaining to support the 969th and 101st Airborne Division. The 333rd, 969th, and other artillery groups were commandeered by the 101st, and formed a temporary artillery group. The newly enlarged 969th continued to support the 101st Airborne Division until 12 January 1945, where it was relieved from the 101st and assigned back to the 3334 Field Artillery Group.

== Colmar Pocket ==
Beginning on 23 January 1945, it continued to support various divisions and groups, including the 1st French Division (DNII) and the 30th Field Artillery Group in Alsace, France during the Colmar Pocket. The 969th had fired 912 rounds on the first day of the attack. On 25 January 1945, the 969th attached to the 5th French Armored Division, and later to the 75th Division and the 2d French Armored Division. The 969th, joined by the African American 999th Artillery Division and the 686th Artillery Division fired support for XII Corp's run along the Saar River and the Rhine. By 28 April 1945, the battalion had fired its last shots of the war.

By the end of the war, the 969th Field Artillery Battalion had fought with all four American armies in the European theatre, and with the French in the Colmar Pocket. It had fired a total of 42,489 rounds from its howitzers in support of American and French allied divisions.

=== Distinguished Unit Citation ===
Because of its success and gallant support at Bastogne, the 969th received its Distinguished Unit Citation through Third Army on 7 February 1945, from Maj. Gen. Maxwell Taylor, commander of the 101st. This was the first Distinguished Unit Citation awarded to an African American combat unit.
