= Born, Belgium =

Born
- Village
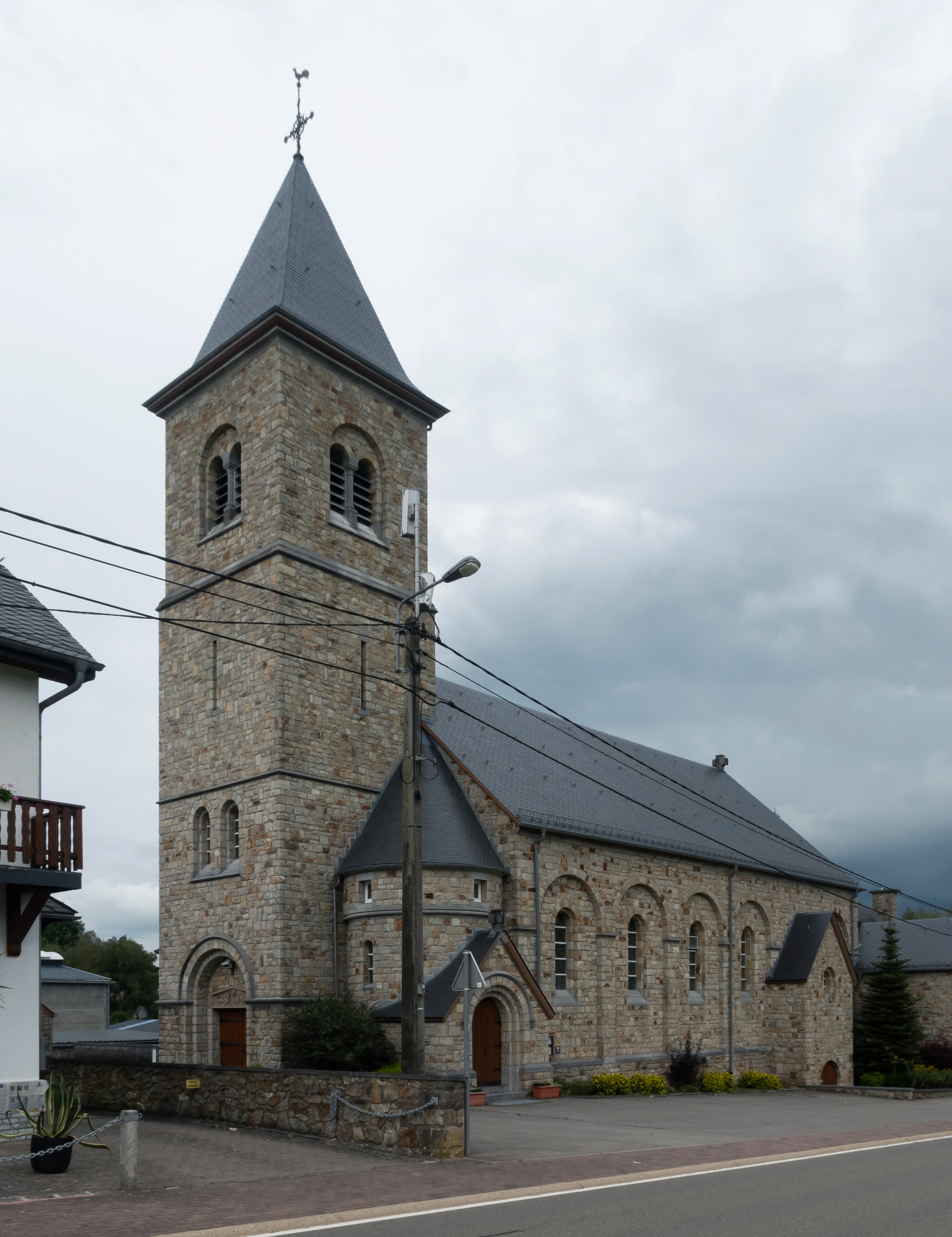
- Sankt Luzia Kirche

- Location within Belgium
- Coordinates: 50°19′58″N 6°07′03″E
- Country: Belgium
- Community: German-speaking Community
- Province: Liège
- Time zone: UTC+1 (CET)
  - Summer (DST): UTC+2 (CEST)

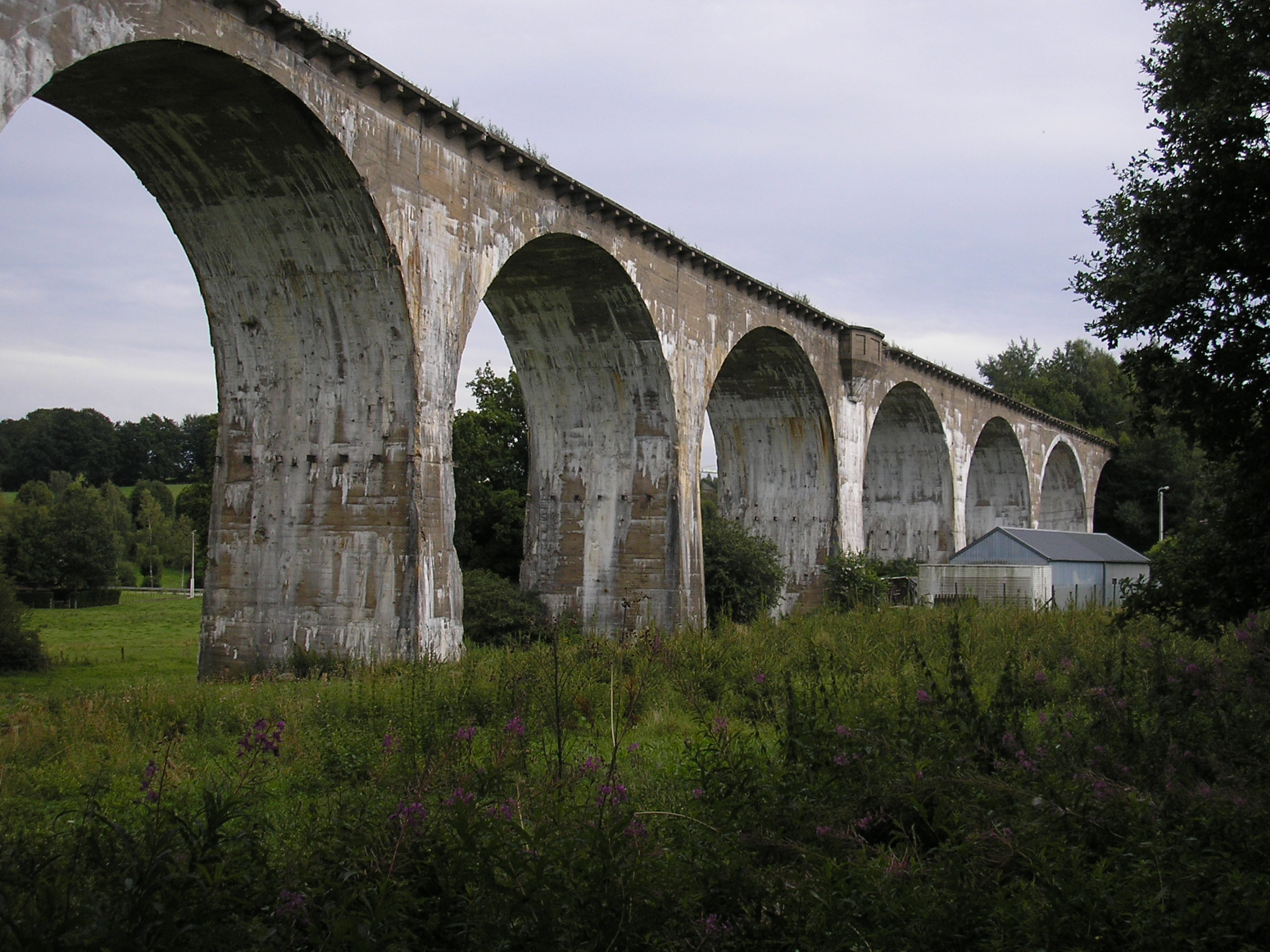
Amel-Born Viadukt

Born is a village in the German-speaking Community of Belgium. It is part of the municipality of Amel in the province of Liege (Wallonia).

Its most recognizable landmark is an old bridge (completed in 1916, 11 arches, 285 m long, 18 m high).

Born is located on the Vennbahn, a former railway line between Aachen (Germany) and Ulflingen (Luxembourg). The former line to Vielsalm branches off in Born. This line is connected to the Vennbahn by the 'Freiherr von Korff Bridge', a flyover structure. During World War I, the Imperial German Army had occupied Belgium to fight against France.

The bridge is named after the former district administrator of Malmedy, Friedrich Freiherr von Korff. The former railway line has been converted into the Ravel cycle path L47A.
