= 1898 Tampa riot =

The Tampa Riot was a confrontation between white soldiers from the state of Ohio and black troops from the 24th and 25th Regiments on June 6 and 7, 1898. The riot occurred the day before their embarkation to Cuba to fight the Spanish in the Spanish American War. The riot highlighted the racial divide that existed in the United States and the discrimination they faced as soldiers.

== Background ==
=== The Buffalo Soldiers ===
In the aftermath of the Civil War, Congress, in its reorganization of the U.S. military, mandated that two of the six cavalry regiments and four of its forty-five infantry regiments be made of African Americans. This was how the 9th and 10th U.S. Cavalry and the 38th, 39th, 40th, and 41st Infantry came into being. In 1869 however, the four African American infantry regiments were reorganized into the 24th and 25th Infantry regiments, the same two regiments that would be at the center of the Tampa Riot. From the outsets, the soldiers in these regiments were ostracized from the regular army with many white officers refusing to serve with African American soldiers. This refusal came in part due to the racist perception that African Americans did not make good soldiers. This notion would be disproved on the battlefield, and even as fresh recruits, the soldiers in these regiments gained a reputation for coolness under fire and an indomitable fighting spirit. For the next two decades, these regiments found themselves at the forefront of numerous conflicts against Native Americans, and their fighting prowess earned them the respect of not only Native Americans but also among white soldiers. The Army and Navy Journal even declared that the comradery between white and black soldiers signaled an end to prejudice against blacks in the regular army. When war broke out between Spain and the United States, the Buffalo Soldiers "were among the first units dispatched to southern camps in preparation for the invasion of Cuba."

=== Arrival In Tampa ===
The four units that arrived in Tampa were confronted with the discrimination of the Jim Crow South. The Tampa press was especially critical of the black soldiers, and frequently published stories painting them as undisciplined and riotous. The Tampa Daily Tribune revealed the true reason the citizens of Tampa resented the black soldiers, stating: "The men insist upon being treated as white men are treated and the citizens will not make any distinction between the colored troops and the colored civilians." For these soldiers who had fought with distinction on the frontier, they were appalled by the Tampa resident's efforts to demonize them and resisted efforts by the residents to enforce the practice of segregation practices that had arisen in the South. Resentment toward the black soldiers was not limited to civilians. White soldiers expressed regular vitriol about the ability of black soldiers to exercise authority over them and lunged numerous racial epithets at them. Through the summer of 1898, the black soldiers displayed restraint against those who insulted them, but it was clear that tensions were rising.

== The Riot ==
On the night of June 6, the day before the army would embark to Cuba, a group of intoxicated Ohio volunteers "decided to have fun" with a young African American child. They forcefully took the young boy from his mother and used him as a target to "demonstrate their marksmanship." The boy was unharmed but the soldier who won the coemption of marksmanship reportedly shot a bullet through the boy's shirt. For the soldiers of the 24th and 25th Infantry regiments, these actions by the Ohio soldiers broke any remaining restraint they possessed. The soldiers "stormed into the streets firing their pistols indiscriminately, wrecking saloons and cafes which had refused to serve them and forcing their way into white brothels." The riot then quickly turned into a confrontation, not only between white civilians but also the white soldiers in the city. The Tampa police attempted to stop the riot, but they were too few in number to effectively stop the regiments engaged in the riot. The riot went on well into the night and early morning before troops of the Second Georgia Volunteer Infantry arrived in the city and forcefully quelled the riot. Due to the heavy censorship the military imposed, the full scope of the riot is difficult to grasp. The Tampa Morning Tribune later denied that any riot occurred between the night of June 6 and the morning of June 7. What is known, is that twenty-seven black troops and several soldiers from the Second Georgia were transferred due to serious injuries and corroborating reports that a bloody riot had occurred.

== Public Response ==
News of the Tampa Riot elicited strong reactions among the public. Those who were already skeptical of the proficiency of black soldiers used this incident to claim that their mobilization was a mistake as it had allowed African Americans to "forget his place" in the larger social hierarchy of the United States. A West Virginian stated that he thought all African Americans should be sent to Cuba to die so a riot like what occurred in Tampa could never happen again. Critically, the white press characterized the black troops of the 24th and 25th Infantry regiments as responsible for riot, thus erasing any trace of the role white soldiers played in the event besides the restoring of public order. The African American community was equally outraged due to reports that told of how "many Afro-Americans were killed and scores wounded." African American run newspapers emphasized the role the Ohio volunteers played in instigating the riot and the fact that what the Georgia volunteers had done was not maintain order but carry out an indiscriminate "slaughter of black troops." The divide in perception of the riot demonstrated the racist attitudes held in both the North and South towards African Americans. An African American editor from Norfolk noted that as the wounds of the Civil War and Reconstruction healed between North and South, African Americans would have "to fight to maintain a footing."

== Aftermath ==
Under the cloud of the riot, the Buffalo Soldiers embarked to Cuba. On the ships, the black soldiers were segregated from their white counterparts. Despite this, the black soldiers displayed incredible gallantry. Four soldiers: William Tompkins, George Wanton, Dennis Bell, and Fitz Lee would win the Medal of Honor for rescuing Cuban and American men wounded at the mouth of the San Juan River all while under heavy fire from the Spanish. The recognition these soldiers received did not, however, lessen the racism they or other African Americans faced from white Americans. White soldiers who were not selected to be a part of the main campaign in Cuba regularly let loose their frustration on the civilian population. A black-run newspaper in Jacksonville reported "the cry of ‘lynch him’ is heard often here issuing from the throats of certain U. S. volunteer soldiers in this city." The already present racial resentment coupled with the riot in Tampa before the soldier's departure to Cuba led to the Black soldiers being ill-received when they returned from the war, and they were engaged in daily clashes with the white populace. On August 17, 1898, all of the Buffalo Soldiers were transferred out of Florida due to pressure from the white citizens of Tampa.

The Tampa Riot and its fallout had a powerful effect on the minds of both black and white Americans. It showed both the soldiers and many other African Americans outside of the South the horrors of Jim Crow and lessened optimism that displays of patriotism would strengthen their claim "to all the privileges of citizenship." The event only strengthened Southern commitment to Jim Crow and the use of intimidation to ensure African Americans did not interfere with the new social order they created.
