= Herresbach, Belgium =

Coordinates: 50°19′N 6°15′E

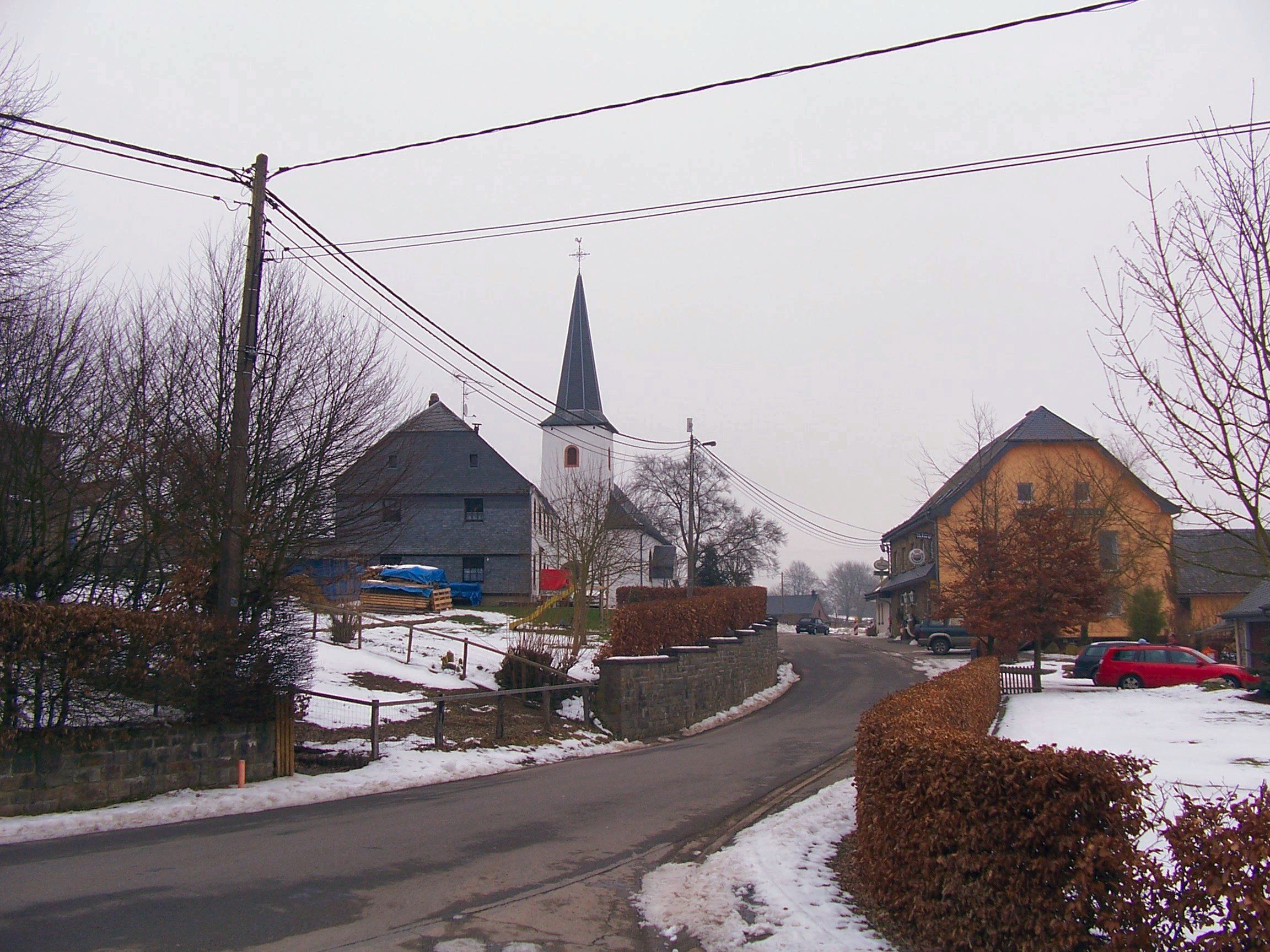
Herresbach (Village center with St. Gangolf's Catholic church)

Herresbach (German pronunciation: [ˈhɛʁəsbax]) is a village in the German-speaking community of Amel within the administrative St. Vith canton in the province of Liège, Belgium and is part of the German-speaking Community of Belgium (German: Deutschsprachige Gemeinschaft Belgiens). With a population of 223 (January, 2013) Herresbach is one of the smaller villages of the Amel community, lies about 5 miles (7 km.) southeast of Amel village and is separated from the adjacent villages in the Amel community by extensive woodlands.

In 1977 Herresbach was part of the Meyerode community that was combined with Amel.
