= Amel =

Municipality in the German-speaking Community of Belgium

Amel: Amblève (French)
- Municipality
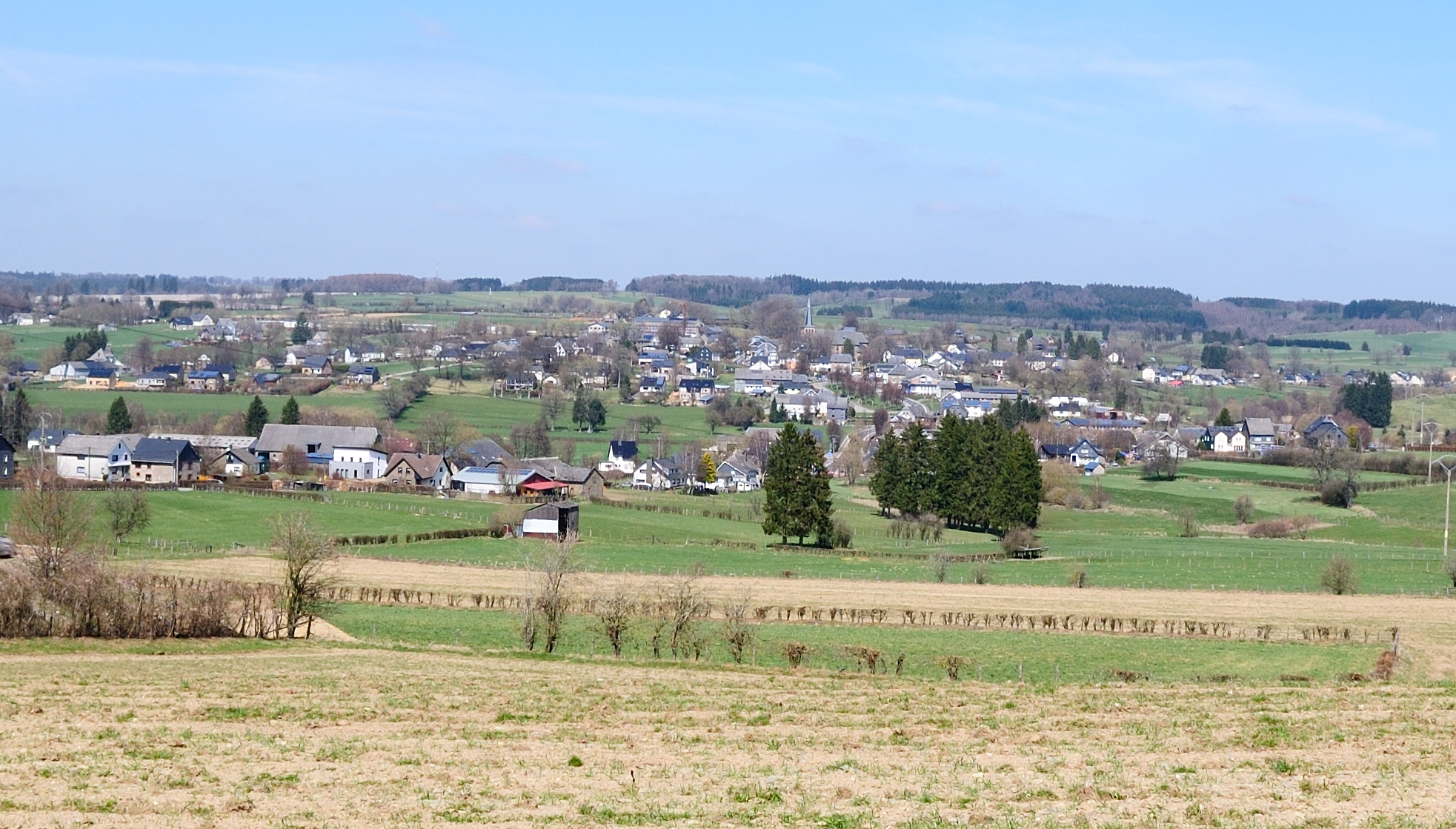

- Coat of arms

- Location of Amel in the province of Liège
- Interactive map of Amel
- Location in Belgium
- Coordinates: 50°21′N 06°10′E
- Country: Belgium
- Community: German-speaking Community of Belgium
- Region: Wallonia
- Province: Liège
- Arrondissement: Verviers

Government
  - Mayor: Erik Wiesemes (SP) (GI)
  - Governing party: GemeindeInteressen (GI)

Area
  - Total: 125.88 km^{2} (48.60 sq mi)

Population (2018-01-01)
  - Total: 5,480
  - Density: 43.5/km^{2} (113/sq mi)
- Postal codes: 4770-4771
- NIS code: 63001
- Area codes: 080
- Website: www.amel.be

Amel (German pronunciation: [aːml̩]; French: Amblève, French pronunciation: [ɑ̃blɛv]) is a Belgian municipality in the Walloon province of Liège, and is part of the German-speaking Community of Belgium (German: Deutschsprachige Gemeinschaft Belgiens). On 1 January 2013, the municipality of Amel had a total population of 5,466. The total area is 125.15 km^{2} which gives a population density of 44 inhabitants per km^{2}.

The name Amel is of Celtic origin and means water. The river Amblève (German: Amel) flows through the municipality.

Amel is the birthplace of Karl-Heinz Lambertz, former leader (Minister-President) of the community executive of the German-speaking community of Belgium.

== History ==
In 716, the Battle of Amblève, between Charles Martel with the Austrasians on one side and the joint forces of the Frisians and Neustrians under Ragenfrid and Chilperic II on the other side, was the first victory for Charles Martel.

Amel was the site of heavy fighting during the Battle of the Bulge. On 17 December 1944, the Wereth Massacre took place when eleven soldiers of the African American 333rd Field Artillery Battalion were tortured and executed by members of the 1st SS Panzer Division Leibstandarte SS Adolf Hitler. A memorial to the Wereth 11 was erected in the village in 1994.

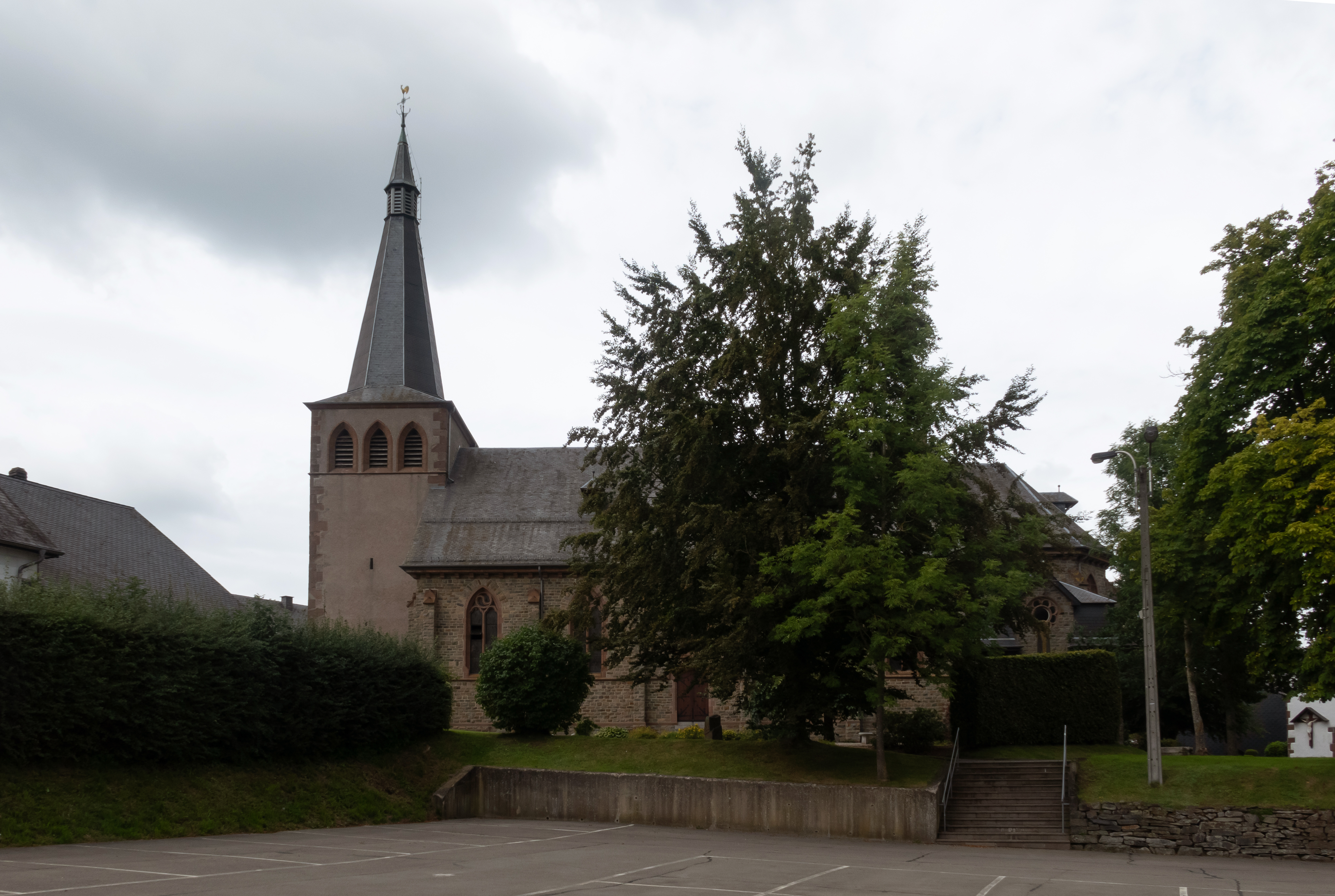
Amel, church: Kirche Sankt Huberrtus

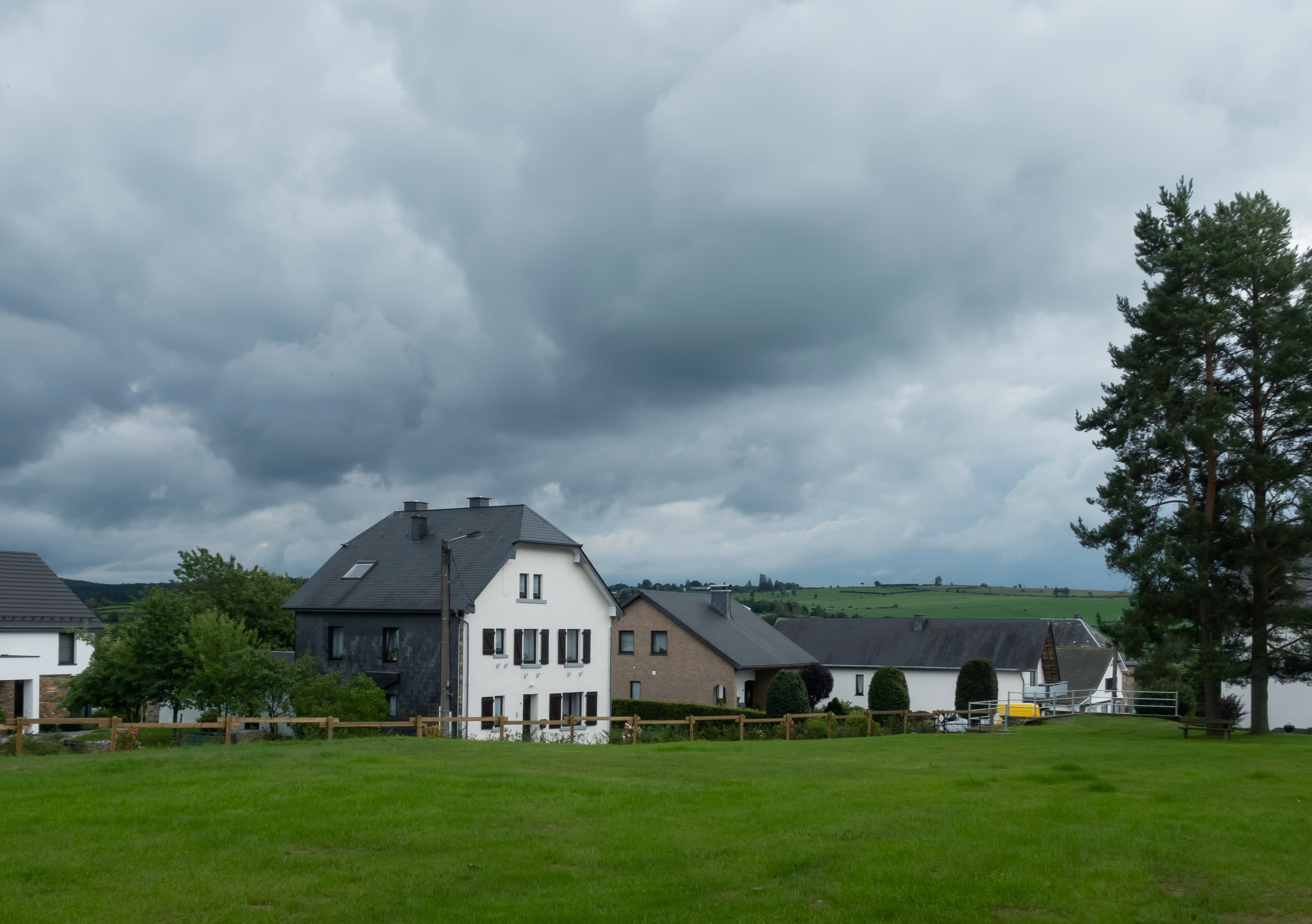
Amel, streetview Kircheweg from the square in front of the church

== Villages ==
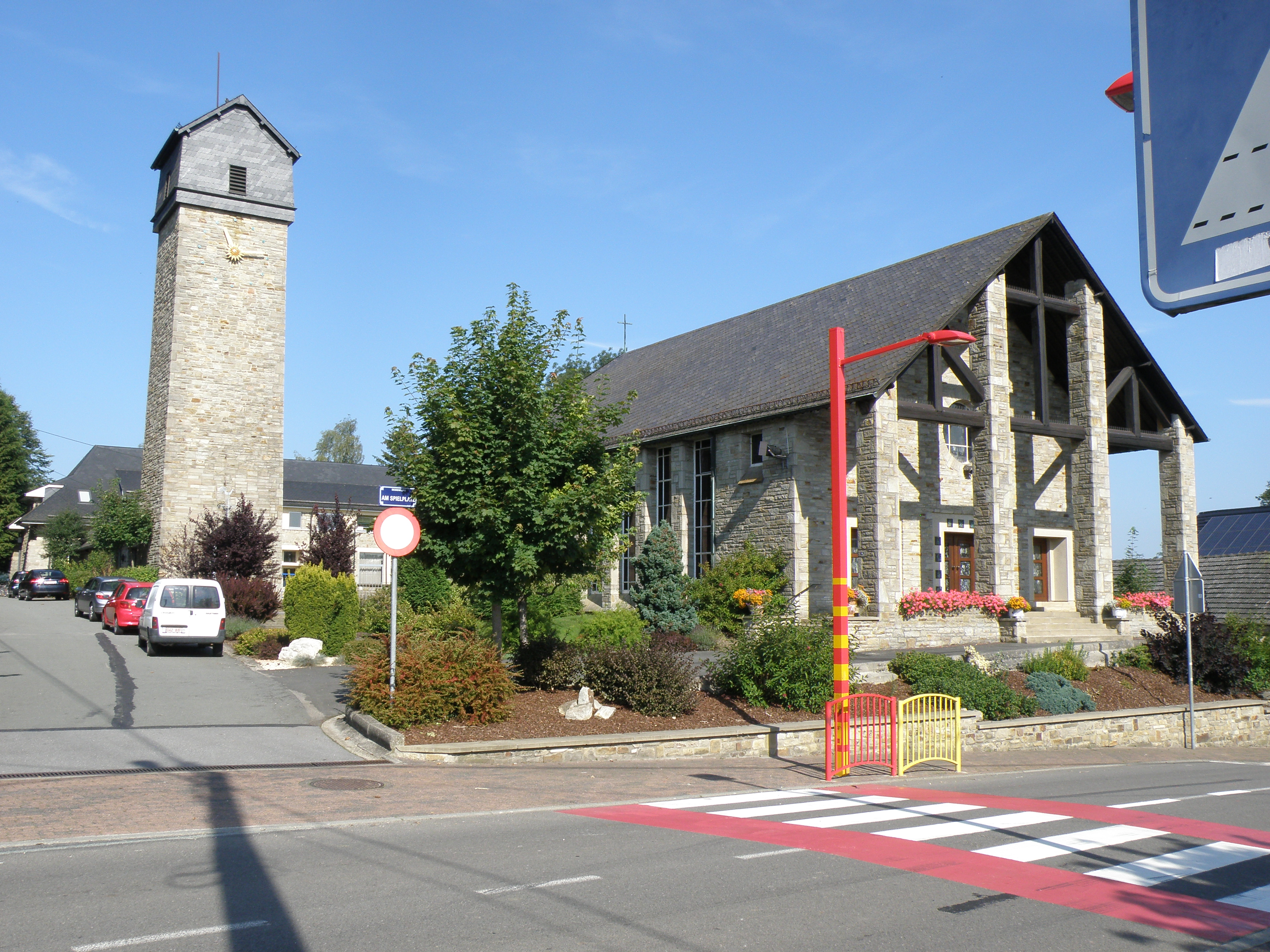
Deidenberg Church

There are eighteen villages in Amel: Amel (village), Born, Deidenberg, Eibertingen, Halenfeld, Heppenbach, Hepscheid, Herresbach, Iveldingen, Medell, Meyerode, Mirfeld, Möderscheid, Montenau, Schoppen, Stephanshof, Valender and Wereth.

== Sports ==
The municipality's football club, KFC Grün-Weiß Amel, plays in the Liège Provincial League first tier (sixth tier overall).

== See also ==
- List of protected heritage sites in Amel
