= Racism against African Americans in the U.S. military =

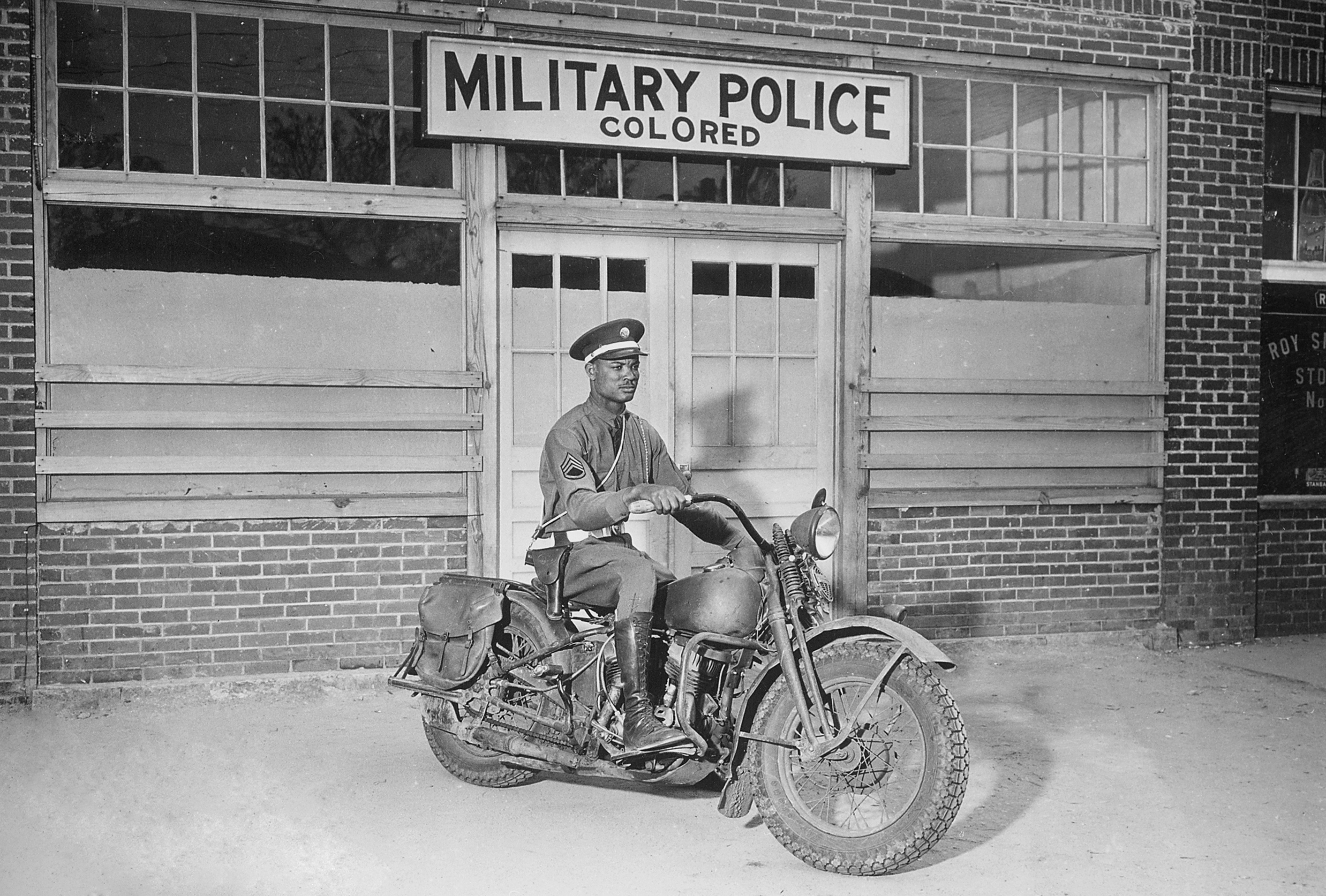
A Black military policeman in front of a "colored" entrance in Columbus, Georgia, 1942

African Americans have served the U.S. military in every war the United States has fought. Formalized discrimination against black people who have served in the U.S. military lasted from its creation during the American Revolutionary War to the end of segregation by President Harry S. Truman's Executive Order 9981 in 1948. Although desegregation within the U.S. military was legally established with President Truman's executive order, full integration of African-American servicemen was not established until 1950 in the Navy and Air Force, 1953 in the Army, and 1960 in the Marine Corps.

== Revolutionary War ==
African-Americans served on both sides of the war in the capacity of both fighting men and slaves. While the Northern United States had opened up their state militias to freed slaves, it was forbidden in the Southern United States to arm slaves as the southern planter class feared the worst from its former slaves. The Royal Governor of Virginia, John Murray, 4th Earl of Dunmore, issued a proclamation in November 1775, promising freedom to runaway slaves who fought for the British. Sir Henry Clinton, Commander in Chief of British forces, issued a similar edict in New York in 1779. Over 100,000 slaves escaped to the British lines; with several units such as the Ethiopian Regiment consisting entirely of black men. The former slaves were promised freedom, and eventually evacuated to Upper Canada after the conclusion of the war.

In response, George Washington lifted the ban on black enlistment in the Continental Army in January 1776. All-black units were formed in Rhode Island and Massachusetts and many of those enrolled were slaves promised freedom for serving. At least 5,000 African-American soldiers fought as revolutionaries, while at least 20,000 served with the British.

== War of 1812 ==
While the Army remained primarily white, a substantial minority of the sailors in the U.S. Navy were black. In fact, during the Battle of Lake Erie African-Americans made up about one-quarter of the personnel in the American naval squadrons. While they served faithfully in the Navy, they were not allowed to serve in the Army. However, naval service was often unpopular and to get sufficient seamen on occasion various shipyard commandants employed slaves as seamen. In his 12 July 1809 letter to the Secretary of the Navy, Commodore Thomas Tingey confirms this practice. Tingey had requested permission to employ up to 20 good slaves in the ordinary. His deputy John Cassin further elaborated, "Sometime past we are so much reduced as not able to man a boat or even to wash the decks of one of the ships. As seamen are not to obtained at the present wages, I therefore suggest to you the propriety of employing a few slaves… as I think they will …answer for many of our purposes as Seaman." Numerous enslaved African Americans were listed in naval shipyards as "Landsman" or "Ordinary" Seaman. On 6 December 1845 Commodore Jesse Wilkinson Commandant of the Gosport Navy Yard confirmed this long standing practice to the Secretary of the Navy, George Bancroft, "that a majority of them [blacks] are negro slaves, and that a large portion of those employed in the Ordinary for many years, have been of that description, but by what authority I am unable to say as nothing can be found in the records of my office on the subject – These men have been examined by the Surgeon of the Yard and regularly Shipped [enlisted] for twelve months" This subterfuge continued until the Civil War.

The law of 1792, which generally prohibited enlistment of blacks in the Army, became the United States Army's official policy until 1862. Due to its chronic shortage of personnel, the Navy never bothered with any restrictions on the enlistment of African-Americans.

== Civil War ==
The Civil War was no doubt the pivotal moment in deciding the fate of African-Americans. A Union victory would mean a swift end to the institution of slavery. A victory for the Confederacy would continue the institution. From the beginning the war was motivated in the South to secede into a separate nation to preserve slavery, which was legal in and crucial to the economies of every Confederate state; in the North, the war was primarily to preserve the union of the United States of America which the Confederate States aimed to abandon, while also abolishing slavery everywhere in the union and preventing slavery's spread to new states and territories in the West. The enlistment of blacks on either side was unheard of outside of state militias until 17 July 1862; Congress passed two acts allowing the enlistment of African-Americans. However, official enrollment occurred only after September 1862. From the moment they donned the uniforms of the Union, African-Americans proved themselves to be invaluable troops; they exceeded all expectations. At first, however, they were not employed on the battlefield; instead, they were used as labor. Initially, many, though not all, white soldiers and officers believed that black men lacked the ability to fight well. Union Gen. John C. Frémont in Missouri and Union Gen. David Hunter of South Carolina, both white, issued proclamations that emancipated slaves in their regions be permitted to enlist at the start of the war, but these orders were immediately rescinded by their superiors. In the North, black freedmen who rushed to join the Union Army were refused due to a 1792 law barring African-Americans from enlisting. These laws were rescinded in the North by the Militia Act of 1862, and ultimately by Lincoln's Emancipation Proclamation. African-American soldiers of the 1st Kansas Colored Volunteers silenced their critics by repulsing attacking Confederate guerrillas at the skirmish at Island Mound, Missouri in October 1862.

Although black soldiers proved themselves as reputable soldiers, discrimination in pay and other areas remained widespread. According to the Militia Act of 1862, soldiers of African descent were to receive $10.00 a month, with an optional deduction for clothing at $3.00. In contrast, white privates received $13.00 per month plus a clothing allowance of $3.50. In early June 1864, Private Sylvester Ray of the 2nd U.S. Colored Cavalry was recommended for trial because he refused to accept pay inferior to that of white soldiers.

First Lieutenant Edwin Hughes of the 2nd U.S. Colored Cavalry, recorded Private Ray as stating, "... none of us will sign again for seven dollars a month..." Later that month, Congress granted equal pay to the U.S. Colored troops and made the action retroactive.

Following the Civil War, an effort was made to allow blacks to attend the United States Naval Academy. John H. Conyers of South Carolina was nominated by South Carolina congressman Robert Elliota and became a midshipman on 21 September 1872. During his first year at the academy, Conyers was subject to severe, ongoing hazing, including verbal torment, shunning, and beatings. His classmates even attempted to drown him, among other abuses. Conyers finally yielded to the chronic academic, physical, and mental haranguing and resigned in October 1873.

== Philippine–American War ==
After the Treaty of Paris, the islands of the Philippines became a colony of the United States. When the U.S. Military started to send soldiers into the islands, most of the native population who had already been fighting their former Spanish rulers, opposed U.S. colonization and retaliated, causing an insurrection. In what would be known as the Philippine–American War, the U.S. Military also sent colored regiments and units to stop the insurrection. However, due to the discrimination of African-American soldiers, many of them defected to the Philippine Army.

One of those who defected was David Fagen, who was given the rank of captain in the Philippine Army. Fagen served in the 24th Regiment of the U.S. Army, but on 17 November 1899, he defected to the Filipino army. He became a successful guerrilla leader and his capture became an obsession to the U.S. military and the American public. His defection was likely the result of differential treatment by American occupational forces toward black soldiers, as well as common American forces derogatory treatment and views of the Filipino occupational resistance, who were frequently referred to as "niggers" and "gugus".

After two other black deserters were captured and executed, President Theodore Roosevelt announced he would stop executing captured deserters. As the war ended, the US gave amnesties to most of their opponents. A substantial reward was offered for Fagen, who was considered a traitor. There are two conflicting versions of his fate: one is that his was the partially decomposed head for which the reward was claimed, the other is that he took a local wife and lived peacefully in the mountains.

== Interwar period ==
"The Navy's racial segregation policies limited African Americans' participation in World War I and, after the war, barred black enlistments altogether from 1919 to 1932. The only black sailors in uniform during that period were the ones aboard in 1919 who were allowed to stay to retire."

In 1932 black people were allowed to serve on US Navy ships as stewards and mess attendants.

== World War II ==
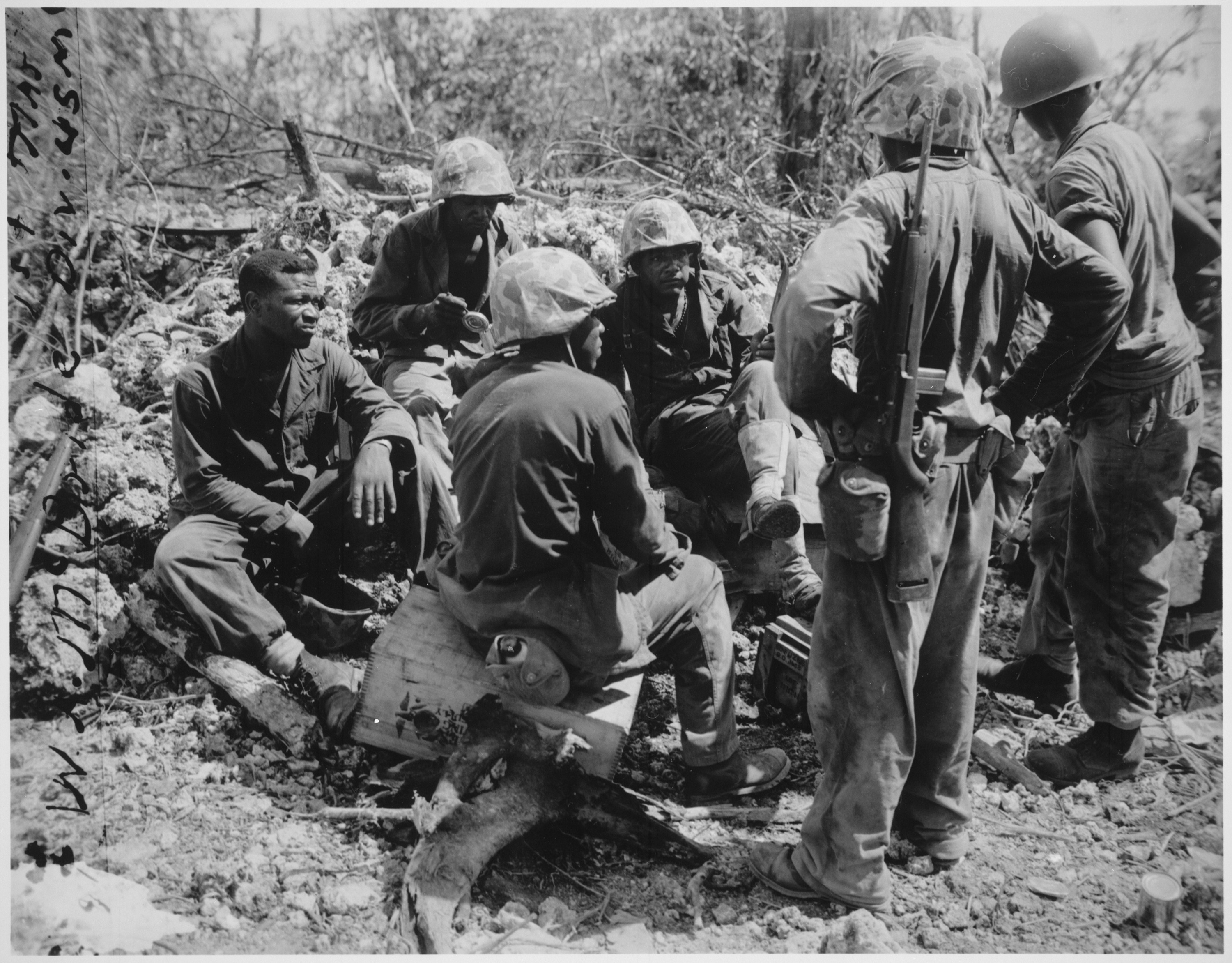
"17th Special" Seabees with the 7th Marines on Peleliu made national news in an official U.S. Navy press release. NARA-532537

During World War II, African-American enlistment was at an all-time high, with more than 1 million serving in the armed forces. Many African-Americans believed that if they could fight and die for their country, their equality would no longer be denied. However, there was a reluctance to allow African-Americans to join combat units and many were against arming black Americans with weapons. However, their eagerness to enlist provided President Roosevelt an opportunity to meet demands and make the steps towards racial integration in the defence industry.

However, the U.S. military remained entirely segregated throughout the war: the marines had no black people enlisted in combat infantry. There were black people in the Navy Seabees, and the United States Army Air Corps all-white policy gave birth to the segregated all-black unit of the Tuskegee Airmen, who trained and lived on a separate airfield and base but endured this in order to prove that African-Americans had what it took to fly military aircraft. The army had only five African-American officers, and these officers were never allowed to command white troops. In addition, no African-American would receive the Medal of Honor during the war, while their tasks in the war were largely reserved to noncombat units, and black soldiers had to sometimes give up their seats in trains to Nazi prisoners of war.

One example of African Americans receiving different treatment was the 17th Special Naval Construction Battalion and the 16th Marine Field Depot on the island of Peleliu, 15–18 September 1944. On D-Day, the 7th Marines were in a situation where they did not have enough men to man the lines and get the wounded to safety. Coming to their aid were the two companies of the 16th Marine Field Depot and the 17th Special Seabee. That night, the Japanese mounted a counter-attack at 0200 hours.

The Field Depot Marines are recorded as again having carried ammunition to the front lines on the stretchers they brought the wounded back on and picked up rifles to become infantrymen. By the time it was over nearly the entire 17th CB had volunteered alongside them. The Seabee record states that besides carrying ammunition and helping wounded they volunteered to man the line where the wounded had been, man 37mm that had lost their crews and volunteered for anything dangerous. The 17th remained with the 7th Marines until the right flank had been secured D-plus 3. According to the Military History Encyclopedia on the Web, were it not for the "Black Marine shore party personnel" the counterattack on the 7th Marines would not have been repulsed.

- On Peleliu when all was done, the white shore party detachments from the 33rd and 73rd CBs received Presidential Unit Citations as did the primary shore party (1st Marine Pioneers). The Commander of the 17th Special CB (segregated) received the same commendatory letter as the Company Commanders of the 7th Marine Ammo Co. (segregated) and the 11th Marine Depot Co.(segregated). Before the battle was even over, Major General Rupertus USMC wrote to each that: "THE NEGRO RACE CAN WELL BE PROUD OF THE WORK PERFORMED [by the 11th Marine Depot Company/ 7th Marine Ammunition Company/ 17th CB]. THE WHOLEHEARTED CO-OPERATION AND UNTIRING EFFORTS WHICH DEMONSTRATED IN EVERY RESPECT THAT THEY APPRECIATED THE PRIVILEGE OF WEARING A MARINE UNIFORM AND SERVING WITH THE MARINES IN COMBAT. PLEASE CONVEY TO YOUR COMMAND THESE SENTIMENTS AND INFORM THEM THAT IN THE EYES OF THE ENTIRE DIVISION THEY HAVE EARNED A "WELL DONE"." The Department of the Navy made an official press release of a copy of the 17th CB's letter on 28 November 1944.

It would take over 50 years and a presidential order before the U.S. Army reviewed their records in order to award any Medals of Honor to black soldiers. This war marked the end of segregation in the U.S. military. In 1948 President Truman signed Executive Order 9981, officially ending segregation in the military.

== Korean War ==
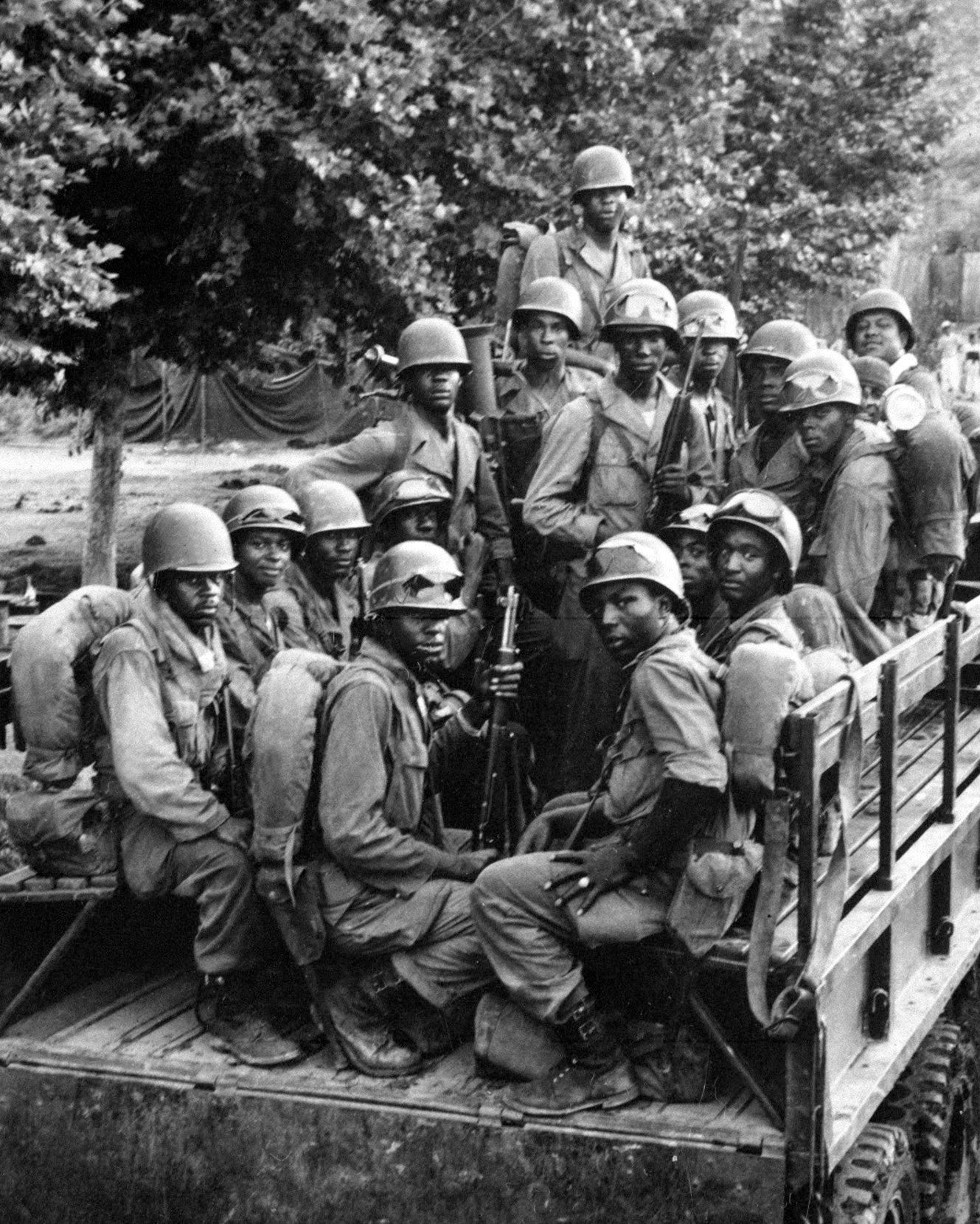
Soldiers of the 24th Infantry in Korea

An estimated "600,000" African Americans fought in the conflict, with "roughly 9.3%" of Americans killed in the war being African American. However, that is not to say that by the Korean War racism had been eliminated within the military due to Executive Order 9981. The double V(ictory) campaign, first established in the Second World War, was considered by some to have continued into Korea, this idea being that the U.S military was fighting for victory on two fronts, "racism at home and in the service". This displays the lasting racism in the military even in the years after the Second World War and Executive Order 9981, intended to abolish discrimination within the U.S military.

== Vietnam War ==
African-Americans who were involved in the Vietnam war were still subject to racism despite the actions of President Truman, the unfairness of the draft, which negated for the war was viewed by many in the African-American community as racist with a 1966 Newsweek poll showing this.

Due to the continuing racism that remained in the United States during the Vietnam War, it was considered by some that "Black Americans" who fought during Vietnam (and also Korea) were fighting, "for the right to fight", this displays the approach of some African Americans who believed that fighting in for the United States would result in greater assimilation in the pursuit of equality.

== Modern Military ==
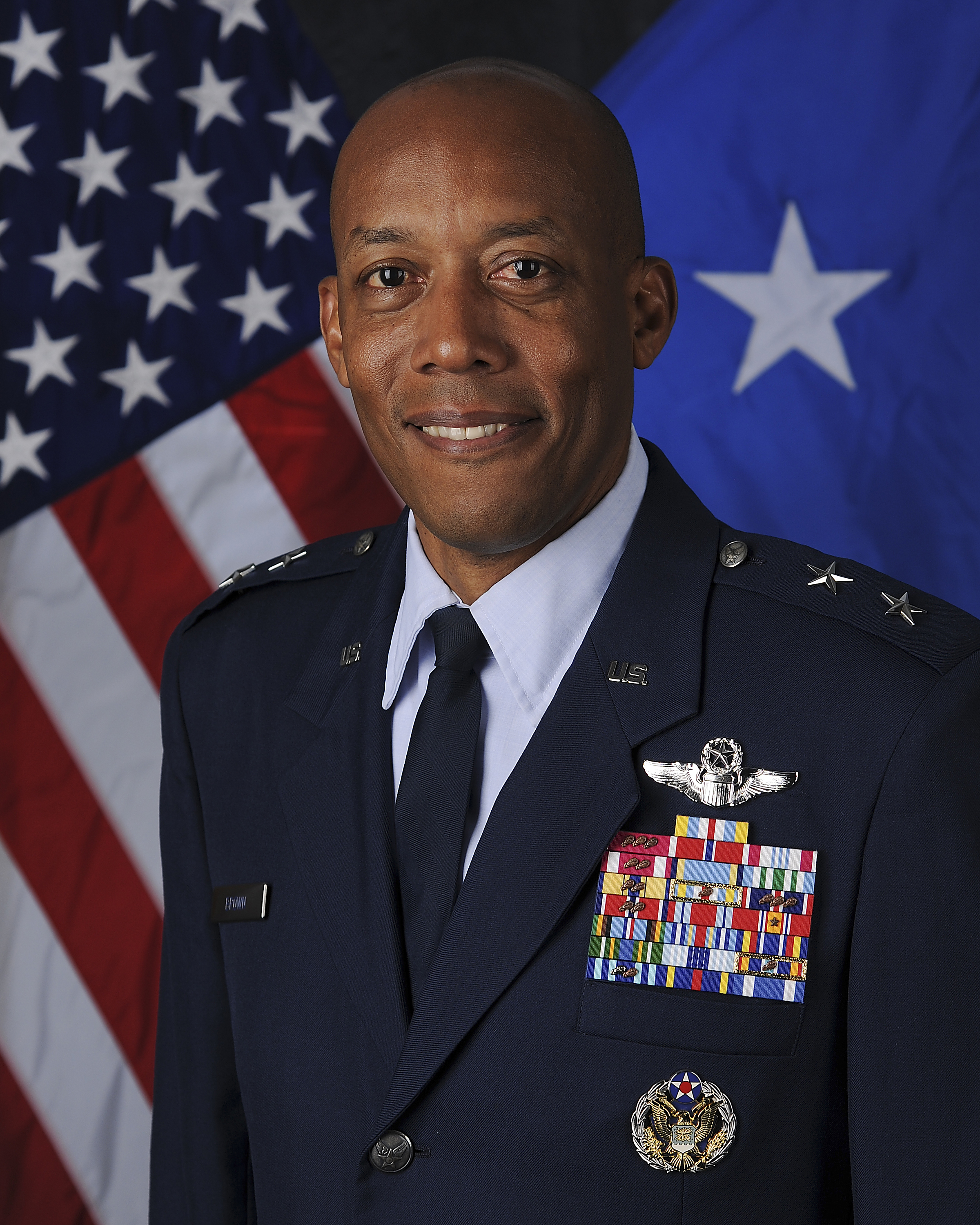
Former Chairman of the Joint Chiefs of Staff, General Charles Q. Brown Jr.

Despite the desegregation of the military in 1948 by Executive Order 9981, the military is still plagued by accusations of racism. In 2020 Mark Milley, Chairman of the Joint Chiefs of Staff, took questions from a senate committee alongside Defence Secretary Mark Esper regarding Civilian Law Enforcement. During the session Milley condemned systemic racism in the United States Armed Forces, testifying that there is no place in the US military, "for manifestations or symbols of racism, bias or discrimination".

Evidence of progress within the US military can be seen through the appointment of Air Force General Charles Q. Brown Jr as the first African American to lead a branch of the US military in 2020 by President Donald Trump as the 22nd Chief of Staff of the Air Force from 2020 to 2023. Following this in May 2023, he was nominated by President Joe Biden to become the 21st Chairman of the Joint Chiefs of Staff, succeeding General Milley, his term is effective as of October 1, 2023.

== See also ==
- Military history of African Americans
- Racial segregation in the United States Armed Forces
