= Clarinet quartet =

Chamber music ensemble

Traditionally, a clarinet quartet is a chamber musical ensemble made up of one clarinet, plus the standard string trio of one violin, one viola and one cello. Nowadays, the term clarinet quartet can also refer to a combination of four clarinets of any size [including (contr)alto and (contra)bass clarinet, and basset horn]. The term is also used to refer to a piece written for any of these ensembles.

== History ==
During the second half of eighteenth and the first of the nineteenth centuries, a large number of quartets for clarinet and string trio were written and published, particularly in Paris, as they proved highly popular in Parisian salon concerts, apparently even more so than quintets for clarinet and strings. Among the earliest examples are the six quartets by Carl Stamitz published as his opus 8 in 1773. Most of these are in a concertante style, treating the clarinet as soloist.

== Works for clarinet quartet ==
The following is an incomplete list of quartets for clarinet, violin, viola and cello, with their composers in alphabetical order.

- Johann Andreas Amon
  - 2 Clarinet quartets (B♭ major and E♭ major), op. 106 (1824)
- Carl Baermann
  - Clarinet quartet, op. 18 [published by Schott]
- Heinrich Baermann
  - Clarinet quartet in B♭ major, op. 18 (1816-1817) [published by Gambaro, Breitkopf & Härtel (1818/19) and Schott (ca. 1820)]
- Matthäus Blasius (1782, 1782-84, ca. 1788 and ca. 1799)
  - 3 Clarinet quartets (F major, E♭ major and B♭ major), op. 1 [published by Sieber (1782)]
  - 3 Clarinet quartets (G major, F major and B♭ major) [published by Breitkopf & Härtel (1782/4)]
  - 6 Clarinet quartets, op. 13 [published by Sieber (1788?)]
- Charles Bochsa (ca. 1795)
  - 3 Clarinet quartets, op. 1 [published by Momigny (1805) and Janet]
  - 3 Clarinet quartets, op. 2 [published by Momigny (1805)]
  - 3 Clarinet quartets, op. 3 [published by Momigny (1805) and Sieber]
  - 3 Nocturnes for clarinet and string trio, op. 14 [published by Dufaut & Dubois]
  - 3 Nocturnes for clarinet and string trio, op. 24 [published by Dufaut & Dubois]
  - Clarinet quartet, op. 30 [published by Dufaut & Dubois]
  - Clarinet quartet in F major
  - Clarinet quartet in B♭ major
  - Clarinet quartet in C major
  - Romances de Gilles variés for clarinet and string trio [published by Dufaut & Dubois]
- Christian Cannabich
  - 2 Clarinet quartets (F major and B♭ major) (1774)
- Antonio Casimir Cartellieri
  - 2 Clarinet quartets
- Charles-Simon Catel (ca. 1796)
- Bernhard Crusell
  - Clarinet quartet in E♭ major, op. 2 [published by Kühnel (1812), Costallat and Richault]
  - Clarinet quartet in C minor, op. 4 [published by Peters (1816), Gambaro and Richault]
  - Clarinet quartet in D major, op. 7 [published by Peters (1823)]
- François Devienne
- Franz Anton Dimmler
  - Clarinet quartet in B♭ major (1798)
- Georg Druschetzky
  - Clarinet quartet in F major
- Charles Duvernoy
  - 3 Clarinet quartets (E♭ major, B♭ major and E♭ major) [published by Hentz and Jouve (ca. 1806 to 1814)]
- Georg Friedrich Fuchs (1788-1791)
  - 3 Clarinet quartets, op. 2
  - 3 Clarinet quartets (E♭ major, F major and C major), op. 5 [published by Imbault]
  - 3 Clarinet quartets, op. 6 [published by Imbault]
  - 3 Clarinet quartets, op. 7 [published by Gaveaux]
  - Clarinet quartets, op. 13 [published by Imbault]
  - 3 Clarinet quartets, op. 39
  - Clarinet quartet in E♭ major
  - Clarinet quartet in B♭ major
- Alexis de Garaudé
  - 3 Clarinet quartets (E minor, D major and A minor)
- Berthold Goldschmidt
  - Clarinet quartet (1983)
- Carl Andreas Göpfert (ca. 1803 and 1818)
  - Clarinet quartet, op. 2 [published by André]
  - 2 Clarinet quartets (C minor and B♭ major), op. 16 [published by André]
  - 3 Clarinet quartets (F major, B♭ major and E♭ major), op. 36 [published by André]
- Adalbert Gyrowetz
  - Clarinet quartet in E♭ major
- Peter Hänsel
  - Clarinet quartet in B♭ major, op. 19 (ca. 1808)
- Pieter Hellendaal
- Johann Simon Hermstedt
  - Clarinet quartet
- Franz Anton Hoffmeister (ca. 1802)
  - 3 Clarinet quartets (E♭ major, B♭ major, E♭ major)
  - 6 Clarinet quartets (B♭ major, E♭ major, D major, B♭ major, E♭ major, E♭ major)
  - Clarinet quartet in B♭ major
  - Clarinet quartet in E♭ major
  - Clarinet quartet in B♭ major
  - Clarinet quartet in E♭ major
  - Clarinet quartet in B♭ major
  - Clarinet quartet in E♭ major
  - Clarinet quartet in B♭ major
  - Clarinet quartet in E♭ major (1799)
- Georg Augustin Holler
  - Clarinet quartet in E♭ major (1786)
  - Clarinet quartet in B♭ major (1790)
  - Clarinet quartet in C major (1790)
- Johann Nepomuk Hummel
  - Clarinet quartet in E♭ major (1808)
- Hans Kammeier
  - Gartenmusik (1949)
- Leopold Koželuch
- Conradin Kreutzer
  - Clarinet quartet in E♭ major, KWV 5203 (1800)
- Franz Krommer (ca. 1802, 1811, 1814, and 1816)
  - Clarinet quartet in B♭ major, P IX:3 (op. 21 no. 1)
  - Clarinet quartet in E♭ major, P IX:4 (op. 21 no. 2)
  - Clarinet quartet in E♭ major, P IX:5 (op. 69) (1809-1810)
  - Clarinet quartet in D major, P IX:12 (op. 82)
  - Clarinet quartet in B♭ major, P IX:13 (op. 83)
  - Clarinet quartet in B♭ major, P IX:B1
- Johann Küchler (1774)
  - 6 Clarinet quartets (F major, C major, C major, F major, G major and F major)
  - Clarinet quartet in E♭ major
- Jean-Xavier Lefèvre (ca. 1805)
  - 3 Clarinet quartets, op. 2 [published by Jouve (ca. 1818)]
  - 3 Clarinet quartets (C minor, E♭ major and B♭ major) (3^{me} Livre de Quatuors) [published by Sieber]
  - Clarinet quartets, with François Simonet [published by Naderman]
- John Mahon
- Friedrich Mainzer
  - 12 Clarinet quartets [published by Breitkopf & Härtel (1785/7)]
  - Clarinet quartet in F major (1799)
- Donald Martino
  - Clarinet quartet (1957)
- Philipp Meissner
  - Clarinet quartet in B♭ major, op. 1 [published by Schott]
  - Clarinet quartet in F major, op. 2 (1814) [published by Schott]
- Wolfgang Motz
  - Aufzubrechen ... ins Offene ... for clarinet and string trio (1983/84)
- Friedrich Müller
  - Clarinet quartet in B♭ major, op. 80 (1859) [published by Hofmeister]
- Iwan Müller (1817–18)
  - Clarinet quartet in B♭ major (1816) [published by André (1821)]
  - Clarinet quartet in E minor [published by André (1821) and Ricordi]
  - Clarinet quartet [published by Gambaro]
- Johann Georg Nanz
  - Clarinet quartet in B♭ major
- Krzysztof Penderecki
  - Clarinet quartet (1993)
- Václav Pichl (ca. 1790)
  - 3 Clarinet quartets (E♭ major, B♭ major and E♭ major), op. 16
- Ignaz Pleyel
  - 3 Clarinet quartets (C major, E♭ major and B♭ major) (1791)
- Gaspard Proksch
  - 6 Clarinet quartets, op. 1 [published by Sieber (ca. 1770)]
- Alan Rawsthorne
  - Clarinet quartet (1948)
- Otto Reinhold
  - Clarinet quartet in D minor (1928)
- Valentin Roeser
  - Clarinet quartet in B♭ major
- Andreas Romberg
  - Clarinet quartet in B♭ major (1788), SteR 155
- Nicholas Schmidt
  - Clarinet quartet [published by Sieber (ca. 1789)]
  - 3 Clarinet quartets [published by Leduc]
- Carl Stamitz
  - 6 Clarinet quartets, op. 8 (1773)
  - Clarinet quartet in E♭ major, op. 19 no. 1
  - Clarinet quartet in B♭ major, op. 19 no. 2
  - Clarinet quartet in E♭ major, op. 19 no. 3
  - Clarinet quartet in B♭ major
  - Clarinet quartet in C major
- Paul Struck (ca. 1795)
  - Clarinet quartet in F major, op. 12 (1813)
- Franz Tausch
  - Clarinet quartet in B♭ major (ca. 1815)[published by André (1820)]
  - Clarinet quartet in B♭ major, op. 30 (ca. 1817) [published by Schott (ca. 1820/1)]
- Dimitri Terzakis
  - Clarinet quartet (1996)
- Luigi Vaudano
  - Clarinet quartet in E♭ major
- Albert Walter
  - 6 Clarinet quartets, op. 27 [published by Pleyel]
- Johann Baptist Wanhal
  - Clarinet quartet in F
  - Clarinet quartet in B♭ major
- Johann Paul Wessely
  - 3 Clarinet quartets, op. 19 (1805)
- Peter von Winter
  - Clarinet quartet in E♭ major
- Franz Xaver Wolf
  - 4 Clarinet quartets
- Michèl Yost and Johann Vogel (ca. 1789)
  - 6 Clarinet quartets (B♭ major, E♭ major, F major, D major, A major and C major), op. 1 (1798) [published by Decombe]
  - 6 Clarinet quartets (B♭ major, E♭ major, B♭ major, C minor, D major and A major), op. 2 (1790-1791) [published by Decombe]
  - 6 Clarinet quartets (B♭ major, F major, A major, B♭ major, F major and E♭ major), op. 3 (1798) [published by Decombe]
  - 6 Clarinet quartets (B♭ major, A♭ major, A major, B♭ major, F major and C major), op. 4 [published by Decombe]
  - 6 Clarinet quartets (A major, B♭ major, F major, E major, C minor and D major), op. 5 (1798) [published by Decombe]
  - 5 Clarinet quartets [published by Frey and Sieber (ca. 1798)]
  - Clarinet quartet in B♭ major

== Arrangements ==
Around 1799, arrangements for clarinet quartet of three of Wolfgang Amadeus Mozart's chamber works appeared in publication, possibly by Johann Anton André: the violin sonata in B♭ major, K 378, the violin sonata in E♭ major, K 380, and the piano trio in G major, K 496.
