= Eva Ander =

German classical women pianist

Eva Ander, married name Ander-Dunckel, (31 October 1928, Dresden – 25 January 2004, Dresden) was a German pianist and music educator.

== Life ==
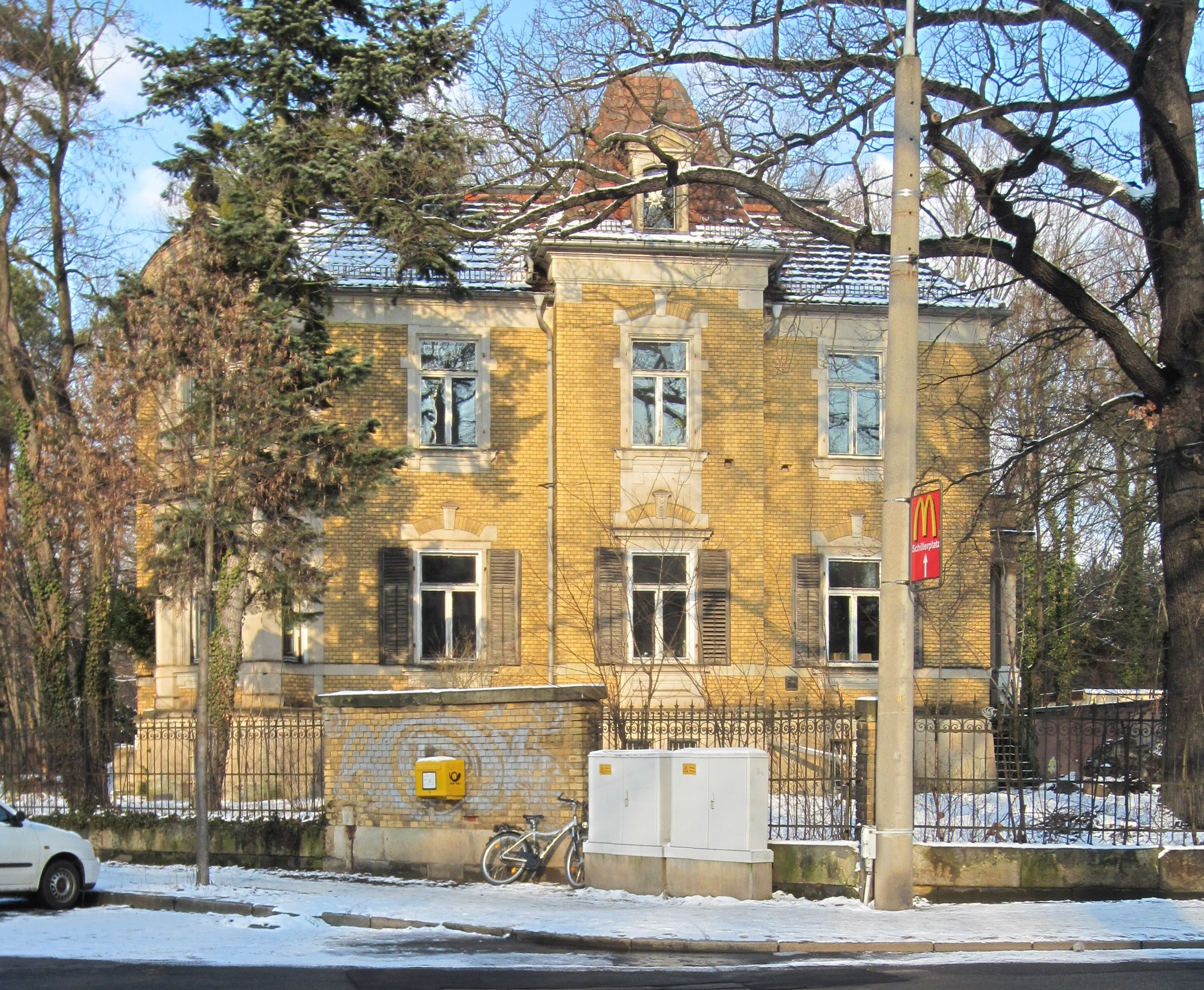
Villa Lothringer, Eva Ander's longtime resident

Born in Dresden, Ander studied piano at the Dresden Hochschule für Musik Carl Maria von Weber Dresden from 1945 to 1950 and completed a master study with Johannes Schneider-Marfels and Theo Other. During this time, she was already performing as a soloist with the Dresden Philharmonic: She made her stage debut in September 1949 in a concert of young artists with a piece by Richard Strauss. After finishing her studies, Ander went to Berlin where she worked as a piano teacher at the Hanns Eisler Academy of Music from 1951. Among her students were the composers Christian Kozik and Helge Jung.

Ander returned to Dresden in 1963 and became a lecturer for piano at the Hochschule für Musik Carl Maria von Weber Dresden. She was appointed professor in 1972 and finished her teaching position in 1989. During her time at the Dresden University of Music, she "decisively shaped the profile of the piano department". Among her students were the pianist Damian Zydek, Detlef Kaiser and Christine Nauck. After her retirement, Ander continued to work as an honorary lecturer at the music academies of Berlin and Dresden.

Ander performed in 36 concerts with the Dresden Philharmonic until 1990 and also worked with the Staatskapelle Dresden from 1950. Guest performances took her as far as Asia. She regularly performed with her husband Rudolf Dunckel with four-handed piano pieces and works for two pianos. After Dunckel's death in 1995, she accompanied opera singer Theo Adam, who had previously worked with her husband, on the piano. Other artists with whom Ander worked included violinist Reinhard Ulbricht and cellist Clemens Dillner. Ander was particularly interested in chamber music and recorded several disks of chamber music pieces. She also recorded numerous piano pieces by contemporary composers from the GDR in world premieres, including works by Otto Reinhold, Johannes Paul Thilman, Ruth Zechlin and Max Butting, Hugo Raithel. In 1990, Ander gave her farewell concert in Dresden under the conduct of Jörg-Peter Weigle.

Ander and Dunkel lived for 30 years in the Villa Lothringer; Ander moved to the Äußere Neustadt after the death of her husband. She died aged 75 in 2004 and was buried at the Waldfriedhof Weißer Hirsch.

== Recordings ==
- 1970: Ludwig van Beethoven – Volksliedervariationen – Zehn Variierte Themen Op. 107 Für Klavier Und Flöte Oder Violine, Eterna, LP
- 1972: Felix Mendelssohn Bartholdy – Sonate Für Violoncello Und Klavier Nr. 1 B-Dur Op. 45 / Sonate Für Violoncello Und Klavier Nr. 2 D-Dur Op. 58, Eterna, LP; 1996 Berlin Classics CD reissue
- 1974: Max Butting – Triptychon für großer Orchester, NOVA, LP
- 1977: Ludwig van Beethoven – Klavierkonzert Es-dur WoO 4. Deutsche Schallplatten, Eterna, LP
- 1981: Klaviermusik des 20. Jahrhunderts, Eterna, LP

=== Anthology appearances ===
- 1990: East German Pianists: A Portrait in Music', Pilz, CD; appears on one track, performing piece by von Weber
- 1993: Famous Sonatas Of Classic [sic], Corona Classic Collection, CD; appears on one Beethoven sonata for four hands, playing along-side Rudolph Dunkel
- 1996: 20th Century Piano Works, Berlin Classics, CD; appears on first seventeen tracks; performing works of Hindemith, Stravinsky, Honegger, Martinů, Milhaud
