= Raithel =

Raithel is a surname that may refer to:

- Franz Raithel (1905–1936), German soldier and skier, competitor in the 1928 Winter Olympics (military patrol); brother of Helmuth Raithel
- Helmuth Raithel (1907–1990), German Waffen-SS officer
- Hugo Raithel (1932–2020), German composer, conductor and pianist
- Johann Raithel (1897–1961), German Luftwaffe officer
- Frida Richard née Friederike Raithel (1873–1946), Austrian actress
