= 23rd Waffen Mountain Division of the SS Kama (2nd Croatian) =

German mountain division of World War II

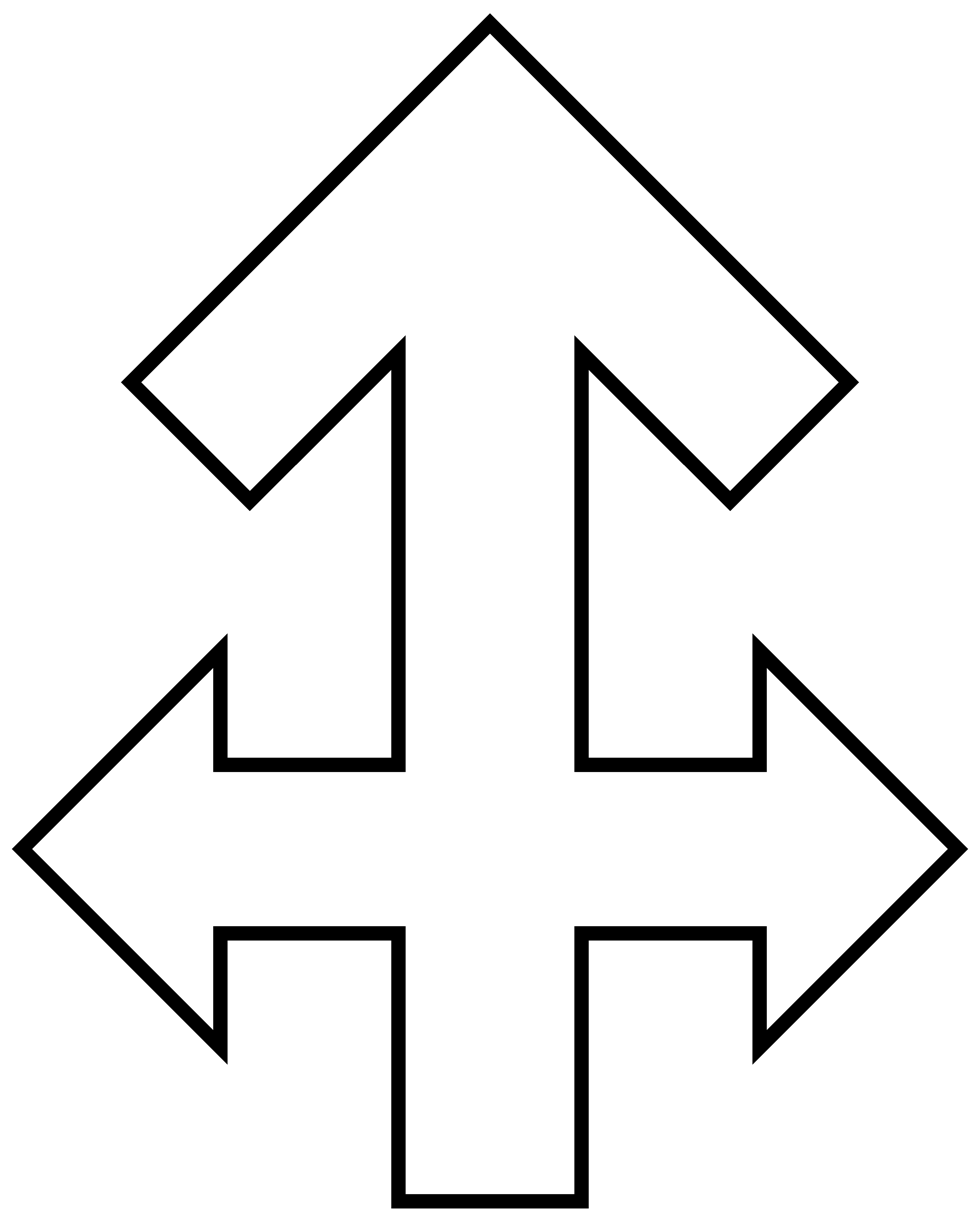
- Divisional vehicle symbol
- Active: 1944
- Country: Nazi Germany
- Branch: Waffen-SS
- Type: Gebirgsjäger (Mountain infantry)
- Role: Anti-partisan operations
- Size: Division (never reached divisional strength)
- Nickname: Kama
- Engagements: World War II; Southern Hungary

Commanders
- Notable commanders: Helmuth Raithel

The 23rd Waffen Mountain Division of the SS Kama (2nd Croatian) was a German mountain infantry division of the Waffen-SS, the armed wing of the German Nazi Party that served alongside but was never formally part of the Wehrmacht during World War II. At the post-war Nuremberg trials, the Waffen-SS was declared to be a criminal organisation due to its major involvement in war crimes and crimes against humanity. The division was composed of German officers and Bosnian Muslim soldiers. Named Kama after a small dagger used by Balkan shepherds, it was one of the thirty-eight divisions fielded by the Waffen-SS during World War II. Formed on 19 June 1944, it was built around a cadre from the 13th Waffen Mountain Division of the SS Handschar (1st Croatian) but did not reach its full strength and never saw action as a formation.

Elements of the division fought briefly against Soviet forces in southern Hungary in early October 1944 alongside the 31st SS Volunteer Grenadier Division. They were soon disengaged from the front line in Hungary and had begun a move to the German puppet state, the Independent State of Croatia, to join the 13th SS Division when the Bosnian Muslim soldiers of the Kama division mutinied on 17 October 1944. The cadre quickly regained control, but the mutiny resulted in the division being formally dissolved on 31 October 1944.

== Background ==
After the invasion of the Kingdom of Yugoslavia by the Axis powers on 6 April 1941, the extreme Croat nationalist and fascist Ante Pavelić, who had been in exile in Benito Mussolini's Italy, was appointed Poglavnik (leader) of an Ustaše-led Croatian state – the Independent State of Croatia (often called the NDH, from the Croatian: Nezavisna Država Hrvatska). The NDH combined almost all of modern-day Croatia, all of modern-day Bosnia and Herzegovina and parts of modern-day Serbia into an "Italian-German quasi-protectorate". NDH authorities, led by the Ustaše Militia, immediately launched a campaign of mass killings, expulsions and forced religious conversions to Catholicism targeting the Serbian Orthodox population living within the borders of the new state.

Despite Pavelić's assurances of equality with the predominantly Catholic Croats, many Muslims quickly became dissatisfied with Ustaše rule. An Islamic leader reported that not one Muslim occupied an influential post in the administration. By early 1942, fierce fighting had broken out between the Ustaše, Chetniks and Partisans in NDH territory. Some Ustaše militia units became convinced that the Muslims were communist sympathizers, and burned their villages and murdered many civilians. The Chetniks accused the Muslims of taking part in the Ustaše violence against Serbs and perpetrated similar atrocities against the Muslim population. The Muslims received little protection from the Croatian Home Guard, the regular army of the NDH, whom the Germans described as "of minimal combat value". Local militias were raised, but these were also of limited value and only one, the Tuzla-based Home Guard "Hadžiefendić Legion" led by Muhamed Hadžiefendić, was of any significance.

The Bosnian Muslims sought protection and independence from the NDH, and saw German support as a means to achieve those aims. Prominent Bosnian Muslims were friendly towards Germany, and Bosnians were generally nostalgic over the former period of Habsburg (Austro-Hungarian) rule. This push was strongly opposed by Pavelić as counter to the territorial integrity of the NDH. By November 1942, these Muslim autonomists were desperate to protect their people and wrote to Adolf Hitler asking that he annex Bosnia and Herzegovina to the Reich. While this idea did not receive Hitler's approval, possibly because he did not want to create problems for Pavelić, Reichsführer-SS Heinrich Himmler saw this as an opportunity to create a Waffen-SS recruiting zone in the NDH to attract Bosnian Muslims. In early 1943, Hitler authorised the raising of the first SS division to be recruited from a non-Germanic people, the 13th Waffen Mountain Division of the SS Handschar (1st Croatian). The division was to be raised primarily from the Muslim population of the NDH.

== History ==
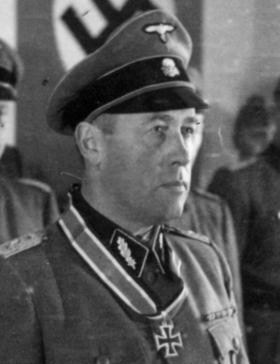
SS Oberführer Gustav Lombard commanded an ad hoc force that fought the Red Army in southern Hungary. It included Bosnian Muslims previously belonging to the 23rd SS Division.

The Germans wanted to recruit a second SS division from the Muslims of Bosnia, as part of Himmler's goal to expand Waffen-SS recruiting in the Balkans. His plan was to form two corps of two divisions, with one corps to operate in the Bosnian region of the Independent State of Croatia and the other in Albania. These corps would then be combined with the Volksdeutsche 7th SS Volunteer Mountain Division Prinz Eugen and together would form a Balkan SS mountain army of five divisions. On 28 May 1944, Hitler gave his formal approval for the creation of a 23rd SS Division, with its formation to begin on 10 June and training to be complete by the end of 1944. Himmler followed the advice of the commander of the 13th SS Division Handschar, SS Brigadeführer and Generalmajor of Waffen-SS (Brigadier) Karl-Gustav Sauberzweig, and agreed to form the division in the neighbouring Bácska (Serbo-Croatian: Bačka) region annexed by Hungary instead of Bosnia. Sauberzweig believed that if the division was raised in the NDH, the Ustaše would undermine the morale of the recruits. The new division was named Kama after a small dagger used by Balkan shepherds.

Orders were given to the 13th SS Division to provide a cadre for the new division, and SS Standartenführer (Colonel) Helmuth Raithel, a regimental commander from the 13th SS Division, was appointed as the new division's commanding officer. The formation of the division was delayed by Operation Vollmond to which the 13th SS Division was heavily committed, so formation did not begin until 19 June. On 21 June, Himmler promoted Sauberzweig to SS Gruppenführer and Generalleutnant of Waffen-SS (major general) and appointed him to command the Bosnian corps, which was given the title IX Waffen Mountain Corps of the SS (Croatian). The corps was to form at Bácsalmás in southern Hungary, where the 18th SS Volunteer Panzergrenadier Division Horst Wessel was deployed.

Beginning on 23 June, 54 officers, 187 non-commissioned officers (NCOs) and 1,137 enlisted men of the 13th SS Division that had been selected for transfer to the 23rd SS Division Kama were assembled in Bošnjaci in Posavina County of the NDH, and they were moved into Bácska on 15 July. They included three NCOs from every company of the 13th SS Division, and one cavalry squadron, one battery from each of its artillery battalions, as well as specialist troops. German officers and NCOs were also provided by Waffen-SS replacement units. The divisional area lay along the Franzen Canal, with garrisons in Szenttamás (Serbo-Croatian Latin: Srbobran) and Kúla (Serbo-Croatian Latin: Kula) and on either side of the line Zombor-Verbász (Serbo-Croatian Latin: Sombor-Vrbas). The 10,000 men for a full-strength division were to be obtained from volunteers, from Muslim conscripts born in 1926 and 1927 (with some exceptions), and if necessary, from the various Muslim militias in the NDH. The conscripts were subjected to the draft by the NDH government then transferred to German command along with the others, who were then transported to Waffen-SS recruiting depots at Zombor and Bošnjaci. These men were to report by 15 September 1944, but in mid-August, Waffen-SS recruiting officer SS Obergruppenführer (Lieutenant General) Gottlob Berger reported to Himmler that there would be insufficient reliable Muslim men available, and Catholic Croats would also have to be accepted into the 23rd SS Division. During Pavelić's visit to Hitler in September 1944, General Đuro Grujić, chief of Pavelić's Military Office, indicated to the Germans that it would be difficult to recruit another 5,000 men to complete the division after 5,000 had already been assigned. Many Volksdeutsche from the NDH and a few from Hungary were recruited into the division to act as interpreters between the Bosnian Muslims and the German cadre and to enhance unit cohesion.

On 10 September the division reached a strength of 126 officers, 374 non-commissioned officers and 3,293 men, composed of German officers and Bosnian Muslim soldiers, a fraction of its prescribed strength of 19,000 men. By this time, morale was waning within the new division just as it completed the final phase of its training in Hungary; the war was not going well, and there were rumours that the Germans were going to abandon the Balkans and leave the Muslims to defend themselves. Faced with high rates of desertion from the 13th SS Division, Sauberzweig proposed a plan to disarm the Bosnians in both divisions, and on 18 September travelled to see Himmler. The Reichsführer-SS instead opted for a plan to transport the 2,000 Bosnians of the 23rd SS Division to the area of operations of the 13th SS Division in Bosnia and re-organise both divisions there. Combat arms units from the 13th SS Division were to be brought under the direct control of IX Waffen Mountain Corps of the SS (Croatian), which would also move to Bosnia. Issued on 24 September, the plan cancelled the formation of the 23rd SS Division, and directed SS Oberführer (Senior Colonel) Gustav Lombard to form and command a new SS infantry division using the German cadre and equipment of the 23rd SS Division, supplemented by ethnic Germans recruited from Hungary. The Bosnians of the 23rd SS Division were to be transported by rail back to the Gradište-Županja-Bošnjaci area for re-organisation into a "new" Kama division.

The staff of IX Waffen Mountain Corps of the SS (Croatian) headquarters left Hungary, and on 3 October 1944 they arrived in the village of Andrijaševci, near Vinkovci. The headquarters became partially operational on 7 October. The Bosnians did not leave Bácska immediately, and for a short period were garrisoned alongside Lombard's new 31st SS Volunteer Grenadier Division. In the meantime, the Red Army continued to advance into Hungary, and on 9 October 1944 a telegram was sent by the commander of Waffen-SS forces in Hungary to IX SS Mountain Corps in Bosnia announcing that "battle ready units from SS Oberführer Lombard's division and Bosnians from the Division Kama had been thrown into the fighting in Bacska". The Bosnian elements were deployed along the Tisza (Serbo-Croatian Latin: Tisa) river for a week or so as part of Kampfgruppe Syr in an attempt to slow the Soviet advance. As a result, the return of the Bosnians to the NDH was delayed.

The Bosnians were soon disengaged from the front line in Hungary and had begun the move to Bosnia to join the 13th SS Division when they mutinied on 17 October 1944. Raithel quickly regained control, but the mutiny meant the re-organisation of a "new" 23rd SS Division was abandoned. A small number of reliable Bosnians from the division were used as replacements in the 13th SS Division, and the 23rd SS Division was formally dissolved on 31 October 1944. Despite its short existence, the 23rd SS is considered one of the thirty-eight divisions fielded by the Waffen-SS during World War II. After the division was disbanded, the numerical designator "23rd" was given to the 23rd SS Volunteer Panzer Grenadier Division Nederland, and Raithel went on to command the 11th SS-Gebirgsjäger Regiment "Reinhard Heydrich" of the 6th SS Mountain Division Nord against the United States Army in southern Germany during the final months of World War II.

The post-war Nuremberg trials made the declaratory judgement that the Waffen-SS was a criminal organisation due to its major involvement in war crimes and crimes against humanity, including the killing of prisoners-of-war and atrocities committed in occupied countries. Excluded from this judgement were those who were conscripted into the Waffen-SS and had not personally committed war crimes and crimes against humanity.

== Order of battle ==
The division's final order of battle consisted of:

- 55th Waffen Gebirgsjäger (Mountain Infantry) Regiment of the SS (3rd Croatian)
- 56th Waffen Gebirgsjäger Regiment of the SS (4th Croatian)
- 23rd SS Mountain Artillery Regiment (of four battalions)
- 23rd SS Reconnaissance Battalion
- 23rd SS Panzerjäger (Anti-tank) Battalion
- 23rd SS Pioneer Battalion
- 23rd SS Mountain Signals Battalion
- 23rd SS Division Supply Battalion
- 23rd SS Medical Battalion
- 23rd SS Replacement Battalion

The division also included a workshop company, veterinary company and administrative section.

== Uniform ==
The divisional insignia was a sun with 16 rays, the ancient symbol of the Macedonian king Alexander the Great. A divisional collar patch bearing the insignia was intended, but it is unlikely it was ever issued. During their formation and training in the Bácska region during the summer of 1944, the soldiers often dressed in khaki tropical uniforms with shorts. The official headgear of the division was the SS M43 fez: a field gray model to be worn with service uniform and a red model for dress uniform. Members of the division that had previously served in the 13th SS Division often continued to wear the divisional collar patch of that division, which showed an arm holding a scimitar over a swastika. These non-standard uniform items continued to be worn by members of the division after they became part of the 31st SS Division in October 1944.

== See also ==
- List of Waffen-SS units
- Table of ranks and insignia of the Waffen-SS
- Waffen-SS foreign volunteers and conscripts
