= Profolk =

Profolk e. V.
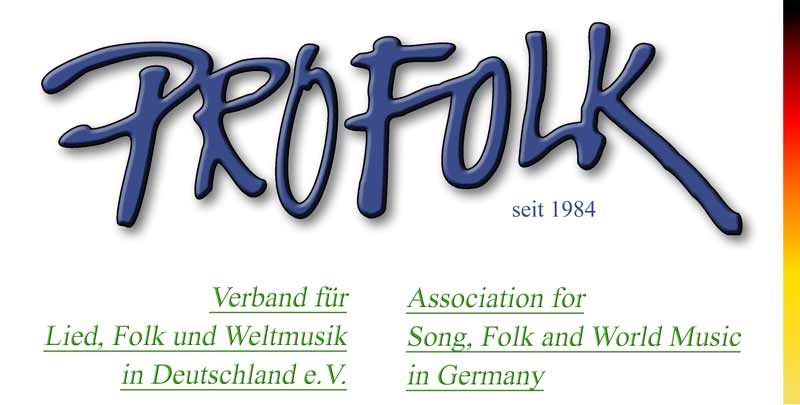
- The logo of the German Association PROFOLK e.V. for Song, Folk and Worldmusic in Germany
- Founded: 25. November 1984 in Göttingen
- Type: Non profit Organisation, NGO
- Purpose: Culture diversity in Folk and Worldmusic
- Location: Berlin, Germany
- Members: Please see paragraph members
- Key people: Maik Wolter, Chairman, Doreen Wolter Office
- Employees: 1 (Fulltime employee, 2019)
- Website: profolk.de

Profolk e.V. (written PROFOLK) is a non-profit and independent volunteer organization for the protection of the interests of persons, associations and organizations in the fields of song, folk and world music. The association exists exclusively for charitable purposes. Profolk is registered in the register of associations Berlin-Charlottenburg, with headquarters in the Brandenburg city of Liebenwalde.

Profolk was founded on 25 November 1984 in Göttingen. Since then, the main objective of the association has been to represent the interests of folk and world music in politics, business and society. Profolk, a member of the German Music Council, is the only national non-profit association in Germany for this genre. The association operates worldwide.

== Members ==
Number	Group
44	Associations, Culture Initiative
130	Musician/Bands
12	Agencies
1	Instrument Maker
4	Journalists
5	Music-Label (publishing company)
46	Event organizer
40	Other

== Officers and board ==
Chairman: Maik Wolter (Liebenwalde) Vice Chairman: Christian Pliefke (Langenzenn) Treasurer: Christian Lange (Berlin) Board Members: Frank Reglin (Syke); Jens Bötger (Hamburg); Ralf Gehler (Schwerin) Office: Doreen Wolter (Liebenwalde)

All cities are in Germany (Europe)

== Tasks and goals ==
The main task of Profolk is to create better conditions for folk and world music. This genre is represented and supported in Germany through constant exchange with political and business entities and the German Music Council. The association also supports the organization and implementation of concerts, workshops and similar activities. In addition, Profolk aims to promote musical, cultural and human diversity.

== History and activities ==
The founders of Profolk

Board of Directors: Jürgen Schmitz, Bremen(Folkinitiative Bremen) Gerd Wagner, Marburg(Folkclub Marburg) Manfred Malzahn, Iserlohn(Folkclub Iserlohn) Reiner Bruchhaus, Gummersbach(Folk-Initiative Bergneustadt) Almut Kückelhaus, Altena(Folkclub Siegen) Managing Director: Harald Schmidt, Duisburg(Folkfreunde Niederrhein)

1. Chairmen (History)

Period	1. Chairmen
1984–1985	Jürgen Schmitz, Bremen
1985–1988	Gerd Wagner, Marburg
1988–1995	Jens-Peter Müller, Grasberg
1995–2000	Michael Kleff, Bonn
2000–2004	Heidi Zink, München
2004–2008	Dieter Wasilke, Venne
2008–to date	Maik Wolter, Berlin

All cities are in Germany (Europe)

ACTIVITIES AND PARTICIPATION IN EVENTS:

Profolk is a co-founder of the international dance & folk Rudolstadt-Festival. The association presents the music scene it represents at national and international trade fairs and festivals such as the Windrose Festival in Schwerin, the Liedertage Boltenhagen/Ostsee, the Festival "Musik und Politik" in Berlin, the Nürnberger Bardentreffen, the Liederfest Hoyschrecke in Hoyerswerda, the WOMEX (World Music Expo) – International Fair in various European countries, the Art & Ethno Forum "Without Borders" in Balchik/Bulgaria and the Showcase in Scotland. The association participates in the Folk Alliance International (FAI) in February 2019 in Montreal/Canada.

== The German Folk Promotion Award ==
Since 1991, the annual Tanz & Folkfest Rudolstadt, also called Rudolstadt-Festival, takes place at the initiative of Profolk e.V. The beginnings of the Rudolstadt Festival date back to 1955, when the "1st Festival of German Folk Dance" was held in Rudolstadt, which developed into the German Democratic Republic (East German) dance and folklore festival with strong Eastern European participation. In 1991 it was relaunched with a completely different concept: initially conceived as a forum for the classical folk scene, the event soon established itself as a world music festival of international renown. The German Folk Promotion Prize (Deutscher Folk Förderpreis, DFF) was awarded at this festival between 1992 and 2001. These prizes were awarded by Tanz & Folkfest Rudolstadt, Profolk e.V., Folk-MICHEL and MDR. From 2002 until now this prize has been renamed "German World Music Prize Ruth". The winners of the respective prizes are as follows:

Winners DFF:

- 1992: 1. Baba Jam Band (Bochum); 2. Hagelschlag und Elfenreigen (Berlin); 3. Noks (Münster)
- 1993: 1. Hölderlin Express (Tübingen): 2. Nure (Berlin); 3. Bremer Straßenmusikorkäster (Bremen)
- 1994: 1. Johannes & Andreas Uhlmann (Leipzig); 2. Werner Vonberg (Heidelberg); 3. Thalassa (Würselen)
- 1955: 1. Grenzgänger (Bremen); 2. Suzanna & Dzelem (Berlin); 3. Trio Modal (Köln)
- 1996: 1. O. Felix (Duisburg); 2. Passepartout (Ludwigshafen); 3. Hora Colora (Berlin)
- 1997: 1. Schlüsselbund (Neustrelitz); 2. Aquabella (Berlin); 3. Schnaftl Ufftschik (Berlin)
- 1998: 1. Kerberbrothers Alpenfusion (Stiefenhofen/Bayern); 2. Micha Dümpelmann (Stegen-Eschbach); 3. Rolling Drones (Breitscheidt)
- 1999: 1. Robert Zollitsch (Berlin); 2. Das blaue Einhorn (Liegau-Augustusbad); 3. Nassler & Schneider (Dresden)
- 2000: 1. Schandmaul (Olching); 2. Jan Degenhardt (Greifswald); 3. Sneppedalen (Dresden)
- 2001: 1. Toni Geiling (Halle); 2. Iki Dünya (Oldenburg); 3. Ecco Meineke

Management of the office of the Deutschen Folk Förderpreises by PROFOLK e.V.:

1992–1996 Jens-Peter Müller, 28879 Grasberg 1997–2002 Liane Fürst, 10781 Berlin

Winners Ruth

Year	German Ruth	Global Ruth	Newcomer Ruth	Honorable Ruth
2002	Daniel Kempin & Dimitri Reznik(Frankf./M.-Köln); Estampie (München); Hundsbuam Miserablige	Di Grine Kuzine (Berlin); El Houssaine Kili (Kassel/Marokko); La Ritma (Wiesbaden)	Törnmeister (Köln); Fjp- the Folk Jazz Project (Leipzig); G. Rag y Los Hermanos Patchekos (München)	not forgiven
2003	Wenzel (Berlin)	Urna (München)	Mohammad Reza Mortazavi (München)	Trikont (München)
2004	Hiss (Stuttgart)	Wu Wei (Berlin)	Yalla Babo Express (Frankenhardt); Zoriya (Israel)	Walter Mossmann (Freiburg)
2005	Biermösl Blosn (Ascholding)	Rabih Abou-Kalil (München)	Malbrook (Berlin); Nomad Sound System (Berlin); Tango Crash (Grafrath)	Dr. Jan Reichow (Köln)

Discography

- 1997 – Its Only Kraut...But I Like It (RUM Records-Löwenzahn)
- 1998 – Prime Cuts (RUM Records-Löwenzahn)
- 1999 – Test the Best – Folk, Song & World Music In Germany (RUM Records-Löwenzahn)
- 2014 – Walzer-Schottisch-Poloness (bcb-Records Berlin)
- 2016 – Auf's Maul geschaut (bcb-Records Berlin)
