= Helmuth Raithel =

German army officer

- Raithel as an SS-Obersturmbannführer
- Born: 9 April 1907; Ingolstadt, Kingdom of Bavaria, German Empire
- Died: 12 September 1990 (aged 83); Semmering Pass, Republic of Austria
- Military career
- Allegiance: Weimar Republic; Nazi Germany
- Branch: Reichswehr; German Heer; Waffen-SS
- Service years: 1926–1945
- Rank: SS-Standartenführer
- Units: 6th Gebirgs Division; 13th Waffen Mountain Division of the SS Handschar (1st Croatian); 6th SS Mountain Division Nord
- Commands: 23rd Waffen Mountain Division of the SS Kama (2nd Croatian)
- Conflicts: Battle of Greece; Eastern Front; World War II in Yugoslavia; Western Front
- Awards: Blood Order; German Cross in Gold; Iron Cross 1st Class
- Other work: Agriculture; Mountaineering

Helmuth Hans Walter Paul Raithel (9 April 1907 – 12 September 1990) was a German officer, finally SS-Standartenführer (colonel) in the Waffen-SS during World War II. While still at school, Raithel was swept up in the excitement of the Munich Beer Hall Putsch of 9 November 1923 led by Adolf Hitler, and was subsequently awarded the coveted Blood Order, even though he was not a member of the Nazi Party. He joined the Reichswehr (interwar German Army) in 1926. After World War II broke out, he fought in the invasion of Greece in summer 1941, then against the Soviet Red Army in northern Finland before transferring to the Waffen-SS in 1943.

Raithel subsequently commanded a regiment of the newly formed 13th Waffen Mountain Division of the SS Handschar (1st Croatian) and led it during fighting against the Yugoslav Partisans in the Independent State of Croatia. Raithel was seriously wounded in mid-1944 and was replaced. When a new Waffen-SS division was to be raised in June 1944, the cadre was provided by the 13th SS Division and Raithel was appointed as the divisional commander. The 23rd Waffen Mountain Division of the SS Kama (2nd Croatian) never reached full divisional strength and did not see action as a formation, but elements of the division fought briefly in southern Hungary in early October 1944. Raithel quickly suppressed a mutiny by the Bosnian Muslim soldiers of the division in mid-October 1944, but it was disbanded and its reliable troops were absorbed by the 13th SS Division and the 31st SS Volunteer Grenadier Division. Raithel was then appointed to command a regiment of 6th SS Mountain Division Nord in Alsace, where his regiment fought the United States Army. He received a serious head wound during fighting northeast of Frankfurt in early April 1945 and was captured by the Americans.

Raithel recovered from his wounds and had a career in agriculture after the war, working in South Africa for many years. He returned to Bavaria when he retired and earned a doctorate of history from the Ludwig-Maximilians-Universität München. His interest in mountaineering continued and he regularly climbed in the Alps into his seventies. He maintained contact with his former comrades from the 6th SS Division, attending many reunions. On 12 September 1990 at the age of 83, he was returning home from the Semmering Pass in eastern Austria when he was killed in a traffic accident.

== Early life ==
Raithel was born in Ingolstadt, Kingdom of Bavaria, a federated state of the German Empire, on 9 April 1907, he was the second son of Bavarian Army Feuerwerker officer, Captain August Raithel. He had two brothers (one older, one younger), both officers. Lieutenant General Ernst Wilhelm "Willy" Raithel, son of Feuerwerker officer Major Johann Raithel, was his cousin.

Raithel attended primary school then the Wittelsbacher-Gymnasium München (secondary school) until 1926. On 9 November 1923 at the age of 16, Raithel was walking his bicycle in Munich when he stumbled across the Beer Hall Putsch being led by Adolf Hitler. Swept up in the excitement, he fell in with a group led by Freikorps veteran Gerhard Roßbach. After shots were fired, he took cover with some of the group in an alley, one of whom wrote down Raithel's name as one of the "party faithful" present that day. He was subsequently awarded the highly prized Nazi Party Blood Order, although he apparently did not have any political beliefs and was not a member of the Party at the time.

After he successfully completed secondary school in early 1926, he joined the Reichswehr as an offizieranwärter (officer cadet) on 1 April 1926. He was posted to the 19th Infantry Regiment during which he spent four years commanding a Gebirgsjäger (mountain infantry) platoon. While he was with the regiment, the Reichswehr was absorbed by the Wehrmacht. Now part of the Gebirgs Brigade, Raithel gained experience as a signals officer and company commander, and was promoted to Hauptmann (captain). With the creation of the 1st Gebirgs Division in April 1938 he was appointed as the adjutant of the 99th Gebirgsjäger Regiment. At the outbreak of war in September 1939 he was an instructor at the mountain infantry school at Fulpmes in the Stubai Alps. He was married and he and his wife had two daughters.

== World War II ==
=== Greece and Finland ===
In August 1940, Raithel was transferred from instructional duties to command a battalion of the newly formed 6th Gebirgs Division, which had been deployed to France on occupation duty in anticipation of involvement in the planned invasion of the United Kingdom, Operation Sealion. When Sealion was abandoned, the division was sent first to Poland then in spring 1941 took part in the invasion of Greece. During the Battle of Metaxas Line in early April 1941, the division, led by Generalmajor (Brigadier) Ferdinand Schörner, breached the formidable Greek defences by crossing a 2,100-metre (6,900 ft) snow-covered mountain pass considered inaccessible by the Greeks. This enabled the division to cut the rail line to Thessaloniki.

Raithel was awarded the Iron Cross 1st Class in late April 1941. Following the defeat of Greece and its allies, the division was deployed to Lapland in northern Finland in September 1941. Raithel remained as a battalion commander with the 143rd Gebirgsjäger Regiment of the division in Finland and was promoted to Major on 1 November 1941. Schörner became Raithel's mentor during their service with the 6th Gebirgs Division. In January 1942 he was awarded the German Cross in Gold. In August 1942 he was transferred to the Oberkommando des Heeres (Army Headquarters) reserve pool for an extended period, during which he returned to the mountain infantry school then served briefly with the 133rd Fortress Division on Crete. He was promoted to Oberstleutnant (lieutenant colonel) on 1 October 1943.

=== Yugoslavia ===
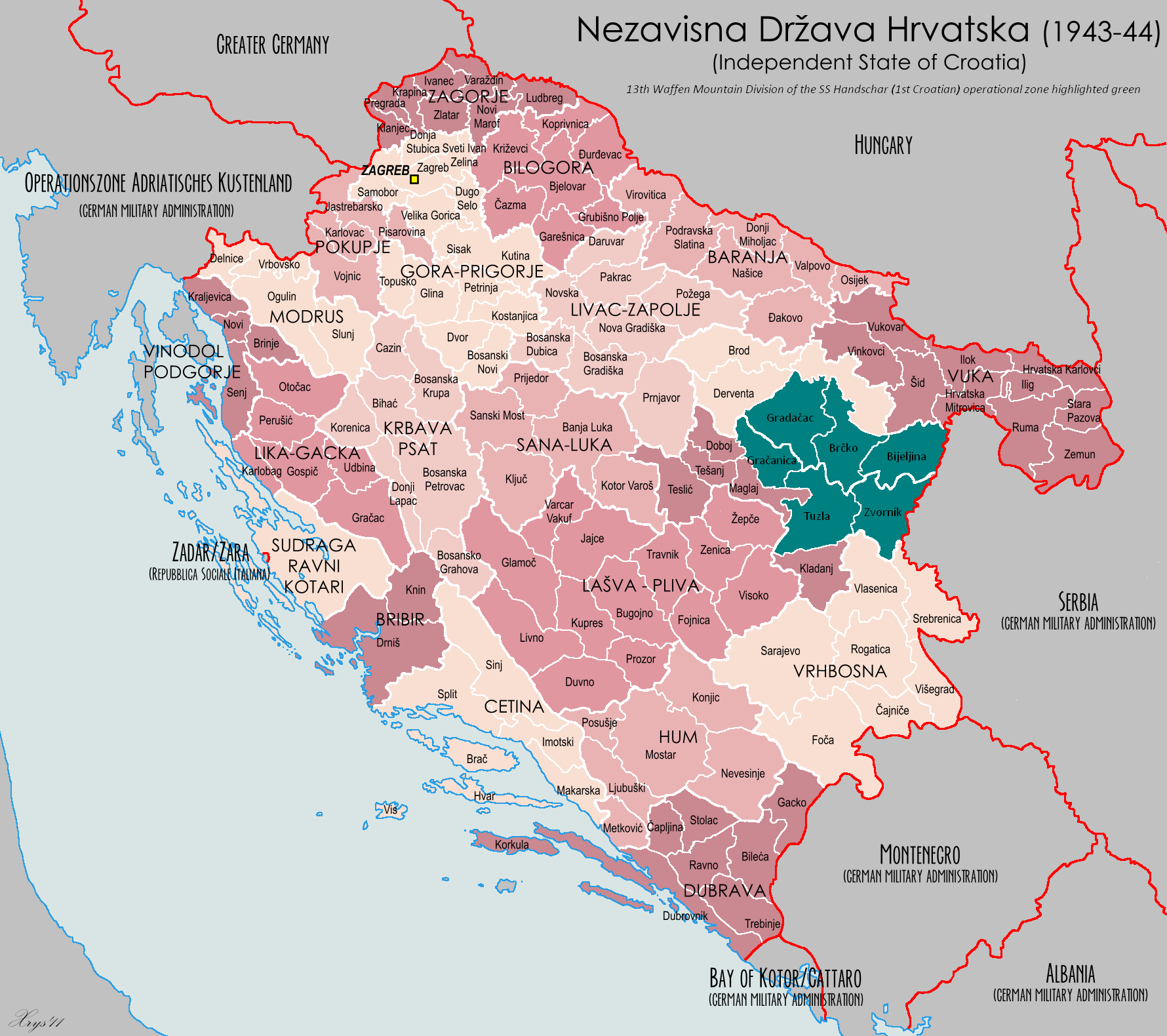
13th SS Division's area of responsibility with the NDH (in green).

In 1943, his mentor Schörner, now a General der Gebirgstruppe (lieutenant general), advised him to transfer to the quickly expanding Waffen-SS where regimental command would be easier to come by, particularly as his Blood Order was especially prized in the Waffen-SS. Raithel subsequently transferred to the Waffen-SS (and Allgemeine SS) on 30 November 1943, but still did not join the Nazi Party. He was immediately appointed to command a regiment of the newly formed 13th Waffen Mountain Division of the SS Handschar (1st Croatian), the rank-and-file of which were mostly Bosnian Muslims. Initially appointed as an SS-Obersturmbannführer (lieutenant colonel) commanding the 28th Waffen Gebirgsjäger Regiment, he oversaw the completion of his regiment's training at the Neuhammer training grounds in the Silesian region of Germany (present-day Poland) then led his regiment to fight the Yugoslav Partisans in the Independent State of Croatia (NDH) in February 1944. The division was given the primary role of securing around 6,000 square kilometres (2,300 sq mi) of territory (the designated security zone) in north-eastern Bosnia within the NDH. The security zone encompassed the Posavina, Semberija and Majevica regions between the Sava, Bosna, Drina and Spreča rivers. Reichsführer-SS Heinrich Himmler saw this task as critical to the safeguarding of important agricultural areas and Volksdeutsche (ethnic German) settlements in the Syrmia region to the north.

Between March and June 1944 Raithel commanded his regiment during several major operations, including what may have been the largest anti-Partisan sweep of the war, Operation Maibaum (Maypole). He was promoted to SS-Standartenführer (colonel) on 1 April 1944. Raithel led his regiment well, resulting in a serious wound in June 1944. On 11 June 1944, he was recommended for an award of the Knight's Cross of the Iron Cross citing his leadership and courage while commanding the regiment, but it was not approved. While it achieved successes and proved itself competent in counter-insurgency operations against the Partisans in eastern Bosnia between March and August 1944, the 13th SS Division earned a reputation for brutality and savagery, not only during combat operations, but also through atrocities committed against Serb civilians in the security zone.

When a second Bosnian Muslim Waffen-SS division was to be raised in June 1944, the cadre was provided by the 13th SS Division and Raithel was appointed as the divisional commander. The 23rd Waffen Mountain Division of the SS Kama (2nd Croatian) never reached full divisional strength and did not see action as a formation, but elements of the division fought briefly in southern Hungary in early October 1944. The Bosnian Muslim members of the division mutinied on 17 October 1944, but Raithel quickly gained control over the situation. Following the mutiny, the division was formally disbanded on 31 October and reliable elements were absorbed by the 13th SS Division and the 31st SS Volunteer Grenadier Division.

=== Germany ===
After a short time convalescing as part of the SS Führungshauptamt (SS headquarters) reserve pool, Raithel was appointed to command the 11th Gebirgsjäger Regiment of the 6th SS Mountain Division Nord in December 1944. In early January 1945, the division was located around Pirmasens near the French-Reich border, reeling from their losses in what was the last major German offensive of World War II on the Western Front, Operation Nordwind. Committed to a series of desperate counterattacks against the United States Army XV Corps, on one occasion Raithel's regiment infiltrated the American positions, surrounding five US infantry companies and taking 450 prisoners of war. The fighting depleted the already understrength regiment, with one company numbering only eight men by 20 January. The commander of one of the US battalions they fought in January 1945 ruefully described Raithel's regiment as, "the best men we ever ran into, extremely aggressive, and impossible to capture. There was no driving them out, for they fought until they were killed".

After a quiet period in February 1945 absorbing replacements, the division was withdrawn from the defensive line and ordered to recapture Trier from the US Army. This attack started on 7 March in freezing conditions but after limited success a fresh US offensive struck the division and forced them back north of Mainz. By 19 March, Raithel's regiment had been converted into a Kampfgruppe (battlegroup) consisting of two gebirgsjäger battalions, a mountain artillery battalion, a pioneer company and eight anti-tank guns. Two weeks later they were fighting their way out of encirclement near Limburg. On 1 April 1945, Kampfgruppe Raithel and the rest of what remained of the division drove east. Shortly afterwards, Raithel received a serious head wound and was captured. The remnants of the division disintegrated over the next few days and weeks and were captured by the Americans.

== Personal life ==
Raithel recovered from his wounds and had a career in agriculture after the war, working in South Africa for many years. He returned to Bavaria when he retired and earned a doctorate of history from the Ludwig-Maximilians-Universität München. He continued with mountaineering and regularly climbed in the Alps into his seventies. He maintained contact with his former comrades from the 6th SS Division Nord and attended many reunions. On 12 September 1990 at the age of 82, he was returning home from the Semmering Pass in eastern Austria when he was killed in a traffic accident.

== Career ==
Raithel received the following promotions during his career, after joining the Reichswehr as an officer cadet on 1 April 1926:

=== Reichswehr ===
- Leutnant - 1 June 1930
- Oberleutnant - 1 July 1932

=== Wehrmacht ===
- Hauptmann - 1 April 1937
- Major - 1 November 1941
- Oberstleutnant - 1 October 1943

=== Waffen-SS ===
- SS-Obersturmbannführer - 1 December 1943
- SS-Standartenführer - 2 April 1944

== Awards and decorations ==
Raithel received the following awards during his service:

- Decoration in Memory of 9 November 1923 on 9 November 1933
- DRL Sports Badge in Silver
- German Olympic Decoration, 2nd Class
- Wehrmacht Long Service Award, 4th to 3rd Class
- Anschluss Medal
- Sudetenland Medal
- Iron Cross, 2nd and 1st Class
  - 2nd Class on 4 October 1939
  - 1st Class on 26 April 1941
- War Merit Cross (1939), 2nd Class with Swords
- German Cross in Gold on 31 January 1942
- Winter Battle in the East 1941–42 Medal on 9 January 1943
- Bulgarian Order of Bravery, 4th Grade, 1st Class
- Infantry Assault Badge in Silver on 22 May 1943
- Crete Cuff Title on 3 April 1943
- Wound Badge in Black in June 1944
- Order of the Crown of King Zvonimir, 1st Class Cross with Swords
