= Gustav Lombard =

German general (1895–1992)

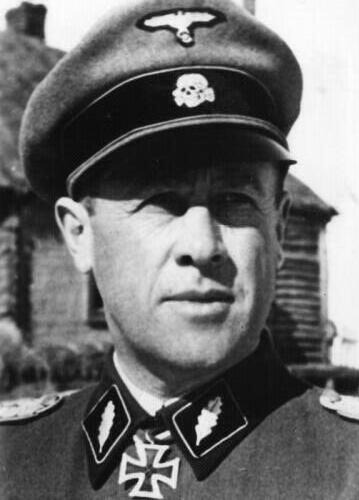
- Lombard in 1943
- Born: 10 April 1895; Prenzlau, German Empire
- Died: 18 September 1992 (aged 97); Mühldorf, Germany
- Military career
- Allegiance: German Empire; Weimar Republic; Nazi Germany
- Branch: Waffen-SS
- Service years: 1933–45
- Rank: SS-Brigadeführer
- Service number: NSDAP #2,649,630; SS #185,023
- Commands: 1st Regiment, SS Cavalry Brigade; 8th SS Cavalry Division Florian Geyer; 31st SS Volunteer Grenadier Division
- Conflicts: World War II
- Awards: Knight's Cross of the Iron Cross
- Other work: Allianz Insurance

Signature
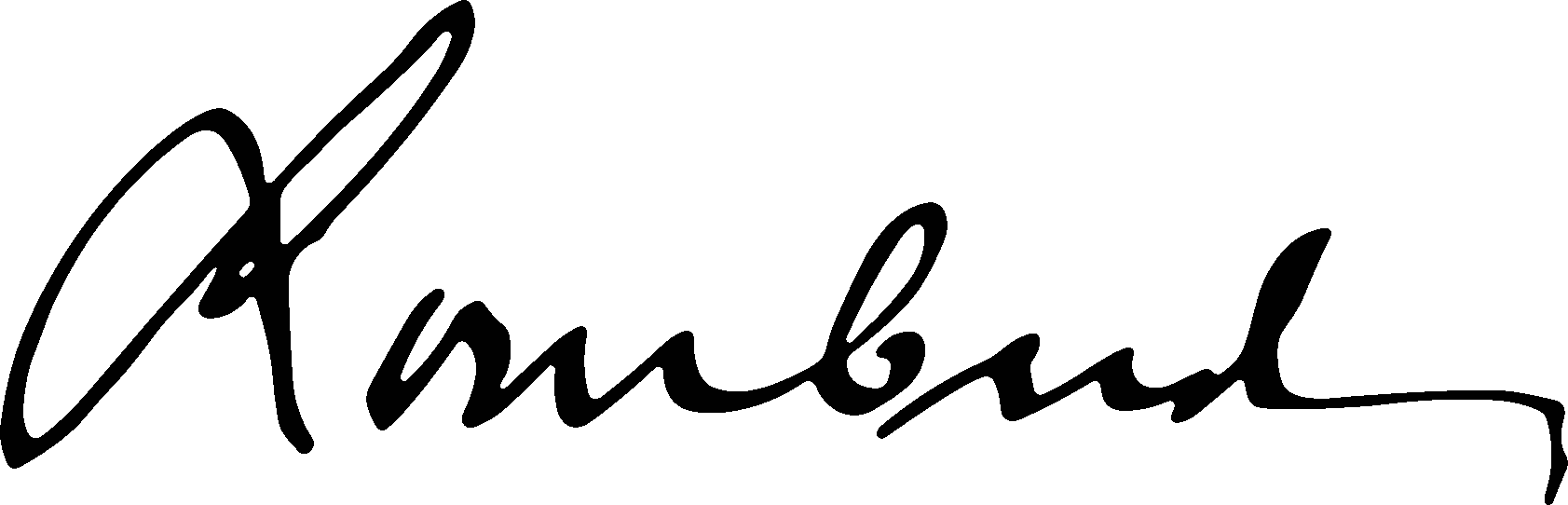

Gustav Lombard (10 April 1895 – 18 September 1992) was a high-ranking member in the SS during World War II. During the war, Lombard commanded 8th SS Cavalry Division Florian Geyer and the 31st SS Volunteer Grenadier Division. He was a recipient of the Knight's Cross of the Iron Cross of Nazi Germany for so-called "anti-partisan" operations around Kovel which involved killing of civilians and burning down villages.

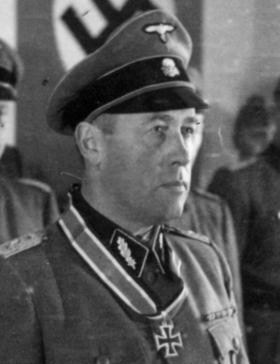
Picture of Lombard being awarded the Knight's Cross of the Iron Cross in March 1943

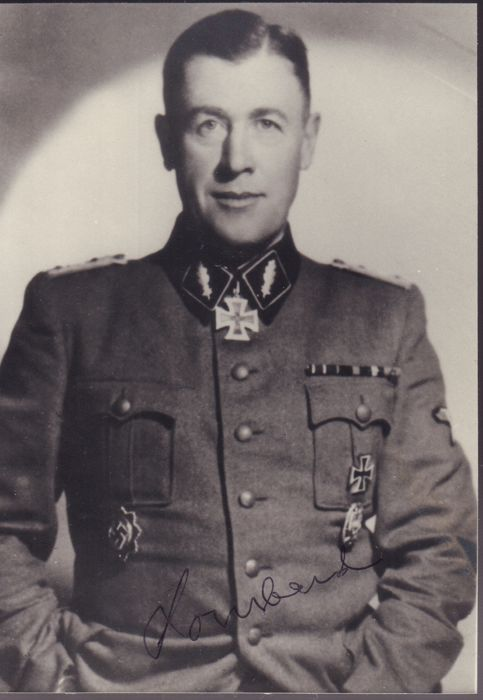
Portrait of Lombard.

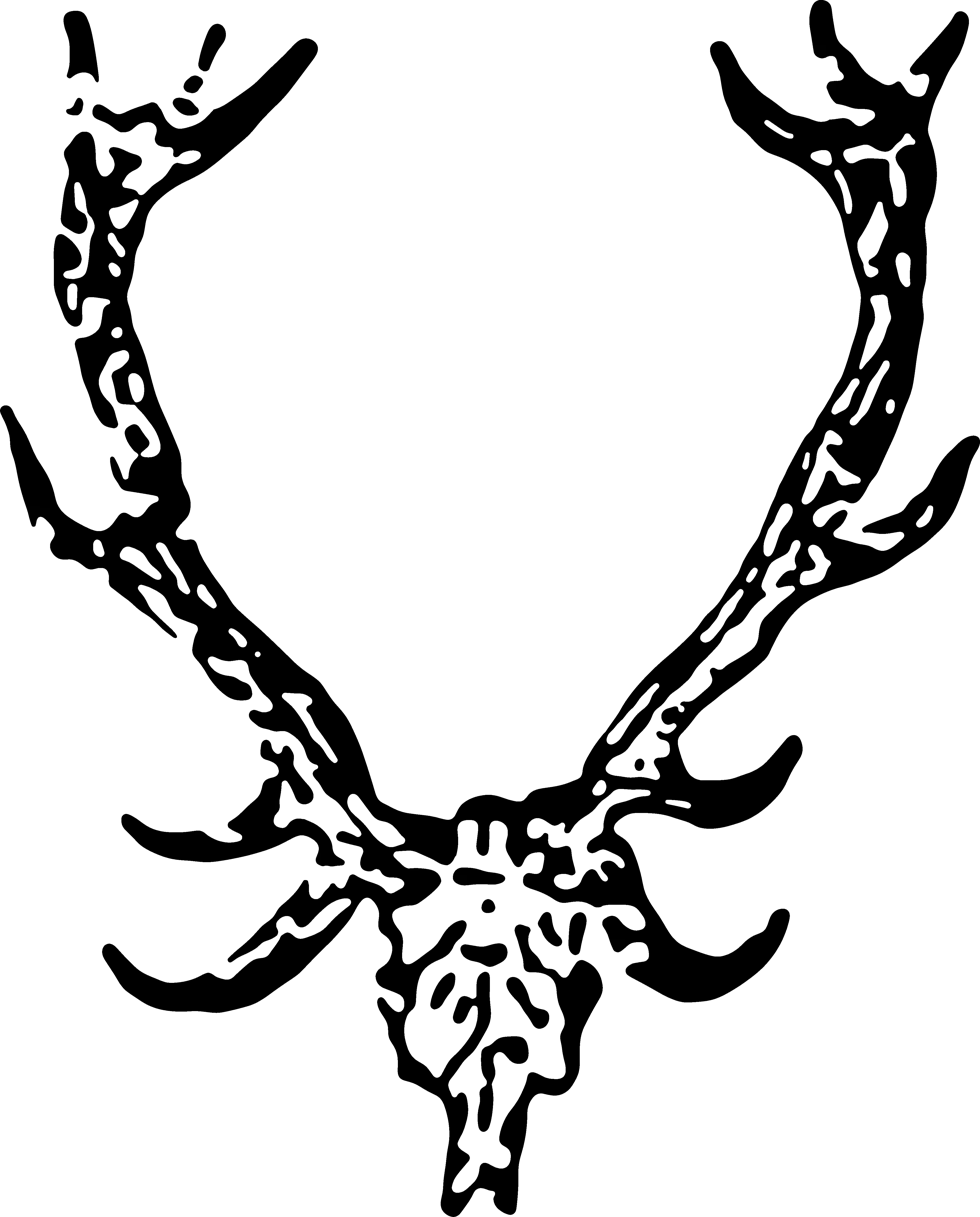
Lombard's personal letterheads used after the war until his death in 1992.

Lombard perpetrated mass murder in the Holocaust, serving as commanding officer of the 1st Regiment of the SS Cavalry Brigade during the German invasion of the Soviet Union. Lombard was convicted of war crimes by a Soviet military tribunal in 1947 and was released in 1955. He was subsequently tried by a West German court in the 1960s and found not guilty.

== Early life and SS career ==
Gustav Lombard was born in Klein Spiegelberg, near Prenzlau, Province of Brandenburg, Germany. After his father's death in 1906 he visited his relatives in the United States in 1913, where he graduated from high school and started studying Modern Languages at the University of Missouri. After the end of World War I he returned to Germany in Autumn 1919 and worked for American Express and the Chrysler Motor Company in Berlin.

Lombard joined the Nazi Party (NSDAP) and SS after the Machtergreifung, the Nazi takeover of power, in 1933; once in the Party, Lombard joined the SS Cavalry. As an instructor of equitation at the SS riding club, Lombard became acquainted with Jochen Peiper, a future adjutant to Heinrich Himmler; throughout the War, Peiper and Lombard remained comrades in arms.

After months of Wehrmacht soldiering in the German invasion of Poland, Lombard was promoted to Commander of the 3rd Squadron of the SS Totenkopf-Reiter-Standarte in December 1939. In Poland, on 7 April 1940, Lombard's unit was ordered to occupy the district of Krolowiec, near the city of Warsaw. That in case of resistance, commander Lombard gave orders that his soldiers hunt and kill any non-German boy and man between the ages of 17 and 60 years. In the after-action report, Hermann Fegelein, commander, 1st SS Totenkopf-Reiter-Standarte, documented and reported a body count of 250 Polish men and boys executed throughout the district of Krolowiec.

== Operation Barbarossa ==
In the end of July 1941 Lombard was commander of a mounted detachment of the 1st SS Cavalry Regiment deployed east of Brest-Litovsk, where he allegedly first used the term ”Entjudung” (De–jewification).

=== Pripyat Marshes massacres ===
On 19 July 1941, by order of Himmler, the 1st and 2nd SS Cavalry Regiments were assigned to the general command of Higher SS and Police Leader (HSSPF) Erich von dem Bach-Zalewski. Combined into the SS Cavalry Brigade under the command of Hermann Fegelein, they were to take part in the action in the area of the Pripet marshes, a large area of land that covered parts of Belorussia and Northern Ukraine. This action became known as the Pripyat Marshes massacres (German: "Pripiatsee"); it was conducted by the combined SS and Wehrmacht forces in July and August 1941 as the "systematic combing" of the area for Jews, 'partisans' and Red Army stragglers. The beginning date of the operation is considered to be 28 July 1941.

General instructions were given to 'cleanse' the area of partisans and Jewish collaborators. Jewish women and children were to be driven away. Fegelein interpreted these orders as follows: Enemy soldiers in uniform were to be taken prisoner, and those found out of uniform were to be shot. Jewish males, with the exception of a few skilled workers such as doctors and leather workers, would be shot. Fegelein split the territory to be covered into two sections divided by the Pripyat River, with Lombard's 1st Regiment taking the northern half and the 2nd Regiment the south, under the command of Franz Magill.

On 1 August, Himmler met with Bach-Zelewski and Fegelein in Minsk, where Himmler ordered that 'all Jews must be shot. Drive female Jews into the swamps'. Following the meeting, Fegelein advised his men that Himmler told him that 'uncompromising severity' was necessary in dealing with the Jewish enemy. He reminded them that he would deal harshly with any commanders that showed weakness. Historian Peter Longerich notes that most orders to carry out criminal activities such as the killing of civilians were vague, and couched in terminology that had a specific meaning for members of the regime. Leaders were given briefings that all Jews were to be viewed as potential enemies that had to be dealt with ruthlessly.

The operation's command staff applied their own interpretation to the orders. On the evening of 1 August, Lombard informed his troops that 'in future not one male Jew is to remain alive, not one family in the villages.' In the following days, he "detailed a new action in which all Jews, including women and children, were murdered with liberal use of automatic weapons" (emphasis in the original).

By 11 August Lombard reported that 11,000 men, women and children had been killed – more than 1,000 each day. His unit also killed 400 dispersed Soviet soldiers. Magill was apparently not as energetic, as, on 12 August, he had to explain that he had not completely eradicated the Jewish 'plunderers' because 'the swamps were not deep enough.'

By 13 August, the combined forces reported 13,788 'plunderers' killed, with only 714 taken prisoner. At the same time, the entire SS cavalry brigade of 4,000 strong suffered 2 casualties dead and 15 wounded. Fegelein's final report on the operation, dated 18 September 1941, states that they killed 14,178 Jews, 1,001 partisans, 699 Red Army soldiers, with 830 prisoners taken and losses of 17 dead, 36 wounded, and 3 missing. The historian Henning Pieper estimates the actual number of Jews killed was closer to 23,700. Thus Fegelein's units were among the first in the Holocaust to wipe out entire Jewish communities.

Lombard's zeal and initiative were noted as he was promoted to regimental commander, while Magill was not and saw himself soon reassigned to an unimportant posting. On 3 September 1941, Lombard was awarded Iron Cross 1st class for 'bravery in battle'.

=== Mogilev conference ===
Despite low threat from insurgents in the rear in the first months of the invasion, Wehrmacht's aggressive rear security doctrine and the use of the civilian 'danger' as a cover for genocidal policies resulted in close cooperation between the army and the security apparatus behind the front lines. One of the examples of such cooperation was a three-day field conference organized in the town of Mogilev by General Max von Schenckendorff, chief of Army Group Center Rear Area, to create an 'exchange of experiences' for the benefit of Wehrmacht's rear unit commanders. Participating officers were selected based on their 'achievements' in operations already undertaken.

The conference got underway on 24 September and focused on 'combatting partisans' (Bekämpfung von Partisanen). Talks presented included the evaluation of Soviet 'bandit' organisation and tactics; why it was necessary to execute political commissars immediately upon capture; and the connection between Jews and partisans. In addition to Lombard, the speakers included: Higher SS and Police Leader Erich von dem Bach-Zelewski; Max Montua, commander of Police Regiment Centre; Hermann Fegelein, commander of the SS Cavalry Brigade; Arthur Nebe, commander of Einsatzgruppe B; and others.

The conference included three field exercises. On the second day, participants traveled to the settlement of Knyazhichi (Knjaschitschi in the German rendering). According to the after-action report, 'suspicious strangers' (Ortsfremde), that is 'partisans', could not be found, but the screening of the population revealed 51 Jewish civilians; of these, 32 were shot. Thus the conference participants were presented with the default targeting of Jews as part of the anti-partisan warfare. The conference, while ostensibly an 'anti-partisan training', was in fact a means 'to promote the annihilation of Jews for racial reasons', as a post-war West German court put it. The conference marked a dramatic increase in the violence against Jews and other civilians in the last three months of 1941.

== Later war ==
On 15 January 1944, Lombard was appointed Chief of Staff of Stossgruppe von dem Bach, a rapid deployment assault unit under the command of Bach-Zalewski. Established to defend Kovel, the unit was composed of the 17th SS Cavalry Regiment, and army artillery, pioneer and assault-gun detachments. Through March 1944, the unit conducted defensive operations and counter-strokes against both partisan formations in the rear and the Red Army forces trying to encircle the city. During the Kovel operations, SS troops and police allegedly perpetrated atrocities in the surrounding area, shooting civilians and burning down villages.

== Post-war ==
Lombard became a prisoner of war in the Soviet Union in April 1945 and was sentenced as a war criminal to 25 years in prison in 1947. In 1955 he returned to West Germany after Chancellor Konrad Adenauer negotiated the release of the remaining German POWs and war criminals from the Soviet Union. He was tried by a West German court in the 1960s; the court case lasted a decade and did not result in a conviction.

Lombard worked for the Allianz Insurance company in Munich. He died in 1992 in Mühldorf am Inn at the age of 97.

== Awards ==
- German Cross on 11 February 1943 as SS-Obersturmbannführer in Reiter-Regiment 1./SS-Kavallerie-Division
- Knight's Cross of the Iron Cross on 10 March 1943 as SS-Obersturmbannführer and commander of SS-Kavallerie-Regiment 1

== See also ==
- List SS-Brigadeführer
