= Detlef Kaiser =

German concert classical pianist

Detlef Kaiser (born 8 December 1955) is a German concert pianist.

== Life ==
Born in Senftenberg, Kaiser studied piano at the Hochschule für Musik Carl Maria von Weber Dresden in the class of Eva Ander. After graduation, he completed an aspirancy at the Moscow Conservatory with Vera Gornostayeva and Mikhail Voskresensky.

After winning a special prize as best of 46 participants from 15 countries at the Maria Canals International Music Competition in Barcelona in 1985, Kaiser developed a busy concert schedule. He gave concerts in the Semperoper Dresden, in the Gewandhaus Leipzig, the Konzerthaus Berlin, in Petersburg, Moscow, Budapest, Bratislava, Havana, Warsaw, Linz, Barcelona, Limassol, Paris and Vienna. Concert tours have taken him to the US and Japan.

In addition to solo recitals and as a chamber music partner, Kaiser has also been soloist with about 50 symphony orchestras.

In 1992, he was appointed professor for piano at the Carl Maria von Weber Academy of Music in Dresden.

Kaiser was a member of the jury at several international piano competitions and gave master classes, among others at the Madrid Royal Conservatory and at the Conservatoire de Paris.
