= 31st SS Volunteer Grenadier Division =

- 31. SS-Freiwilligen-Grenadier-Division; 31. SS-önkéntes-gránátoshadosztály; 31. SS dobrovoljačka grenadirska divizija
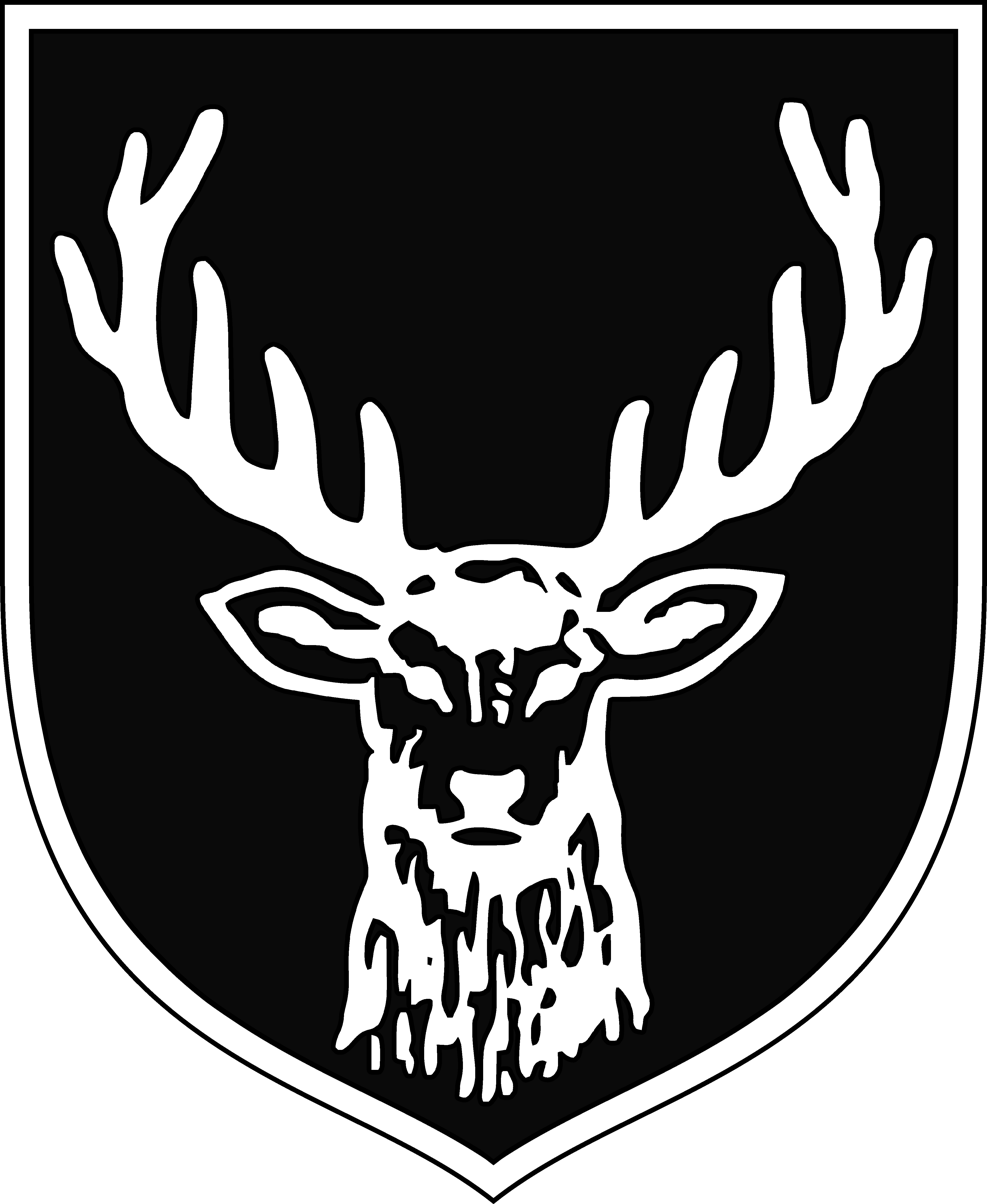
- Divisional symbol, used as early as November 1944.
- Active: 4 October 1944 – 9 May 1945
- Country: Nazi Germany
- Branch: Waffen-SS
- Type: Grenadier
- Role: Infantry
- Size: 14,800 (4 November 1944); 11,000 (16 December 1944)
- Nicknames: 'Division Batschka' 'Division Kukuruz ' 'Division Lombard'
- Motto: "Meine Ehre heißt Treue!"
- Engagements: Second World War; Eastern Front; Belgrade Offensive; Battle of Batina; Debrecen Offensive; Budapest Offensive

Commanders
- Division Commander: SS-Brigadeführer Gustav Lombard (24 September 1944 - 9 May 1945)

Insignia
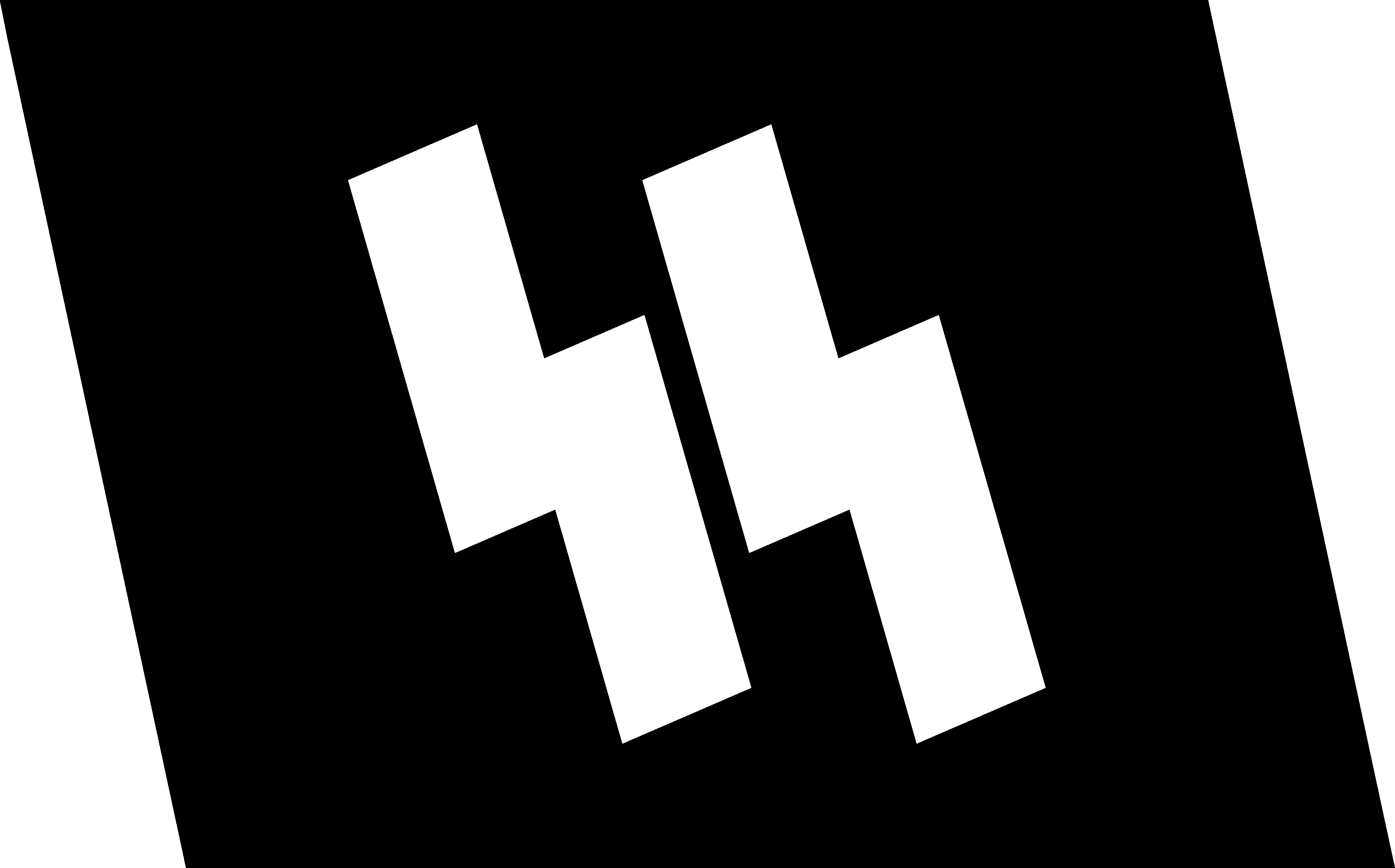
- Divisional collar tab worn on the right side of the collar.

The 31st SS Volunteer Grenadier Division (German: 31. SS-Freiwilligen-Grenadier-Division) (Hungarian: 31. SS-önkéntes-gránátoshadosztály) (Serbo-Croatian: 31. SS dobrovoljačka grenadirska divizija) was a German infantry division of the Waffen-SS during the Second World War. It was commanded by SS-Brigadeführer Gustav Lombard and was active from 4 October 1944 to 9 May 1945. The division was initially mostly made up of Volksdeutsche (ethnic Germans) craftsmen, farmers, and workers from Hungary, primarily the Bačka region. By 26 October 1944, Army Group South deployed the division despite its inadequate training and equipment. The division briefly fought in southern Hungary, defending bridgeheads along the Danube River before withdrawing from the front in early December 1944. After a period of rest and refitting in Slovenia, it was transferred to Silesia, where it was deployed in the Jawor and Strzelin areas in March and April 1945.

By May 1945, the escalating pressure from the advancing Red Army led to the division being encircled, causing the remnants to retreat and attempt an escape. The division's main body elements headed South from Josefov to the direction of Hradec Králové; however, due to a shortage of fuel, they were prevented from advancing further. The unit was dissolved in accordance with orders, and most small groups or individuals were eventually forced to surrender or were killed by Czech insurgents and the Red Army. Many of those who surrendered were taken into Soviet captivity, where some endured prolonged internment, while others died from the harsh conditions.

== History ==
=== Formation ===
On 24 September 1944, an order was issued by the SS-Führungshauptamt disbanding the 23rd Waffen Mountain Division SS 'Kama' in the Bačka, retaining its German cadre who were then mobilised to form a new Waffen-SS infantry division. A second order on 4 October 1944 authorised the formation of the 31st SS Volunteer Grenadier Division under the command of SS-Brigadeführer Gustav Lombard, at this point in time, he was still an Oberführer. The formation of a new SS Grenadier Division from the newly recruited ethnic Germans from Hungary in the spring and summer of 1944 had already been considered. However, this plan had to be postponed several times in favour of other uses for the new recruits.

The large influx of ethnic Germans that were called up in mid-September, mainly from the Bačka and Swabian Turkey regions, allowed the formation of the new division, which was hastily put together. They were combined with the existing personnel and equipment of the Kama Division and then stationed in temporary barracks and private quarters in the northern and western Bačka. Many were later stationed in former garrisons of the disbanded Kama Division. Once settled, they began basic military training in newly established training areas. The restructuring and transition of the divisions was so smooth that some men were unaware that such a reform had taken place, believing they were still serving in the old Mountain Division.

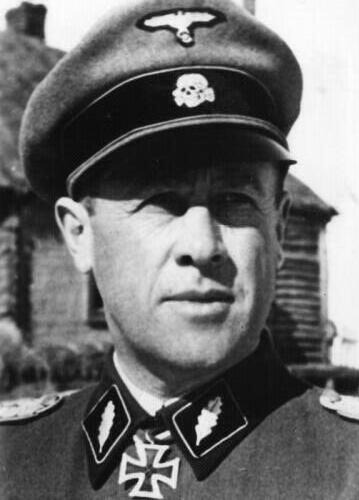
Division Commander Gustav Lombard, shown here as an SS-Standartenführer on 15 March 1943. He commanded the division until it surrendered in Czechoslovakia in May 1945.

=== Recruitment ===
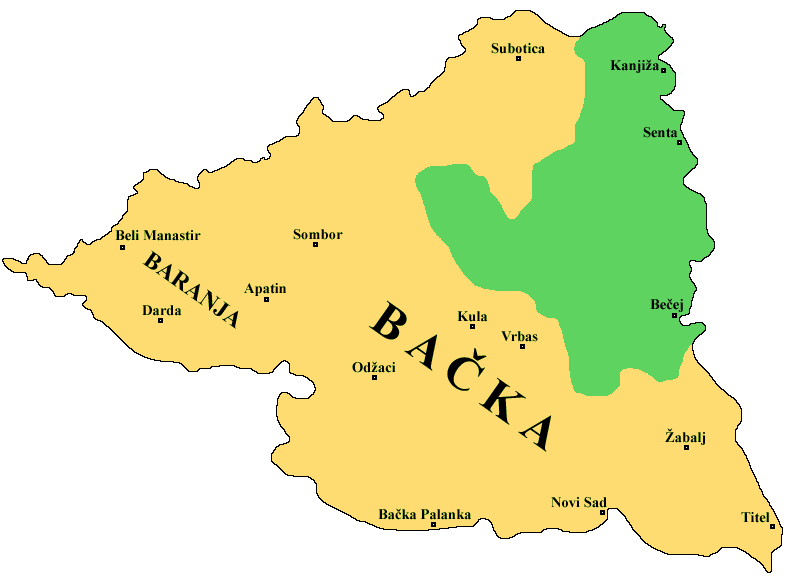
Linguistic map of the Bačka and Baranja regions in 1931, showing areas with a Serbo-Croatian or German-speaking majority in orange and areas with a Hungarian-speaking majority in green.

In the early 1940s, the Waffen-SS sought to expand its membership by recruiting ethnic Germans from Hungary. This initiative was facilitated through a series of agreements with the Hungarian government between 1942 and 1944, resulting in the enlistment of tens of thousands of men. The first major recruitment drive occurred following an agreement signed on 10 February 1942, which authorised the enlistment of ethnic Germans in Hungary into the Waffen-SS. The initiative targeted areas with substantial ethnic German populations, such as the Bačka region. Across both the first and second recruitment drives, approximately 40,000 men were recruited, many of whom had previously served in the Royal Hungarian and Royal Yugoslav armies. The appeal of higher pay and benefits, and the mobilisation of soldiers from communities with strong German-speaking populations made the recruitment drive attractive to many. However, the requirement to renounce Hungarian citizenship upon joining the Waffen-SS was a concern for some, however, these concerns were addressed in the second agreement, under which citizenship would only be revoked once the war had ended, reducing one of the primary barriers to recruitment.

The second recruitment drive, based on an agreement signed on 22 May 1943, targeted ethnic Germans born between 1908 and 1925, exempting them from service in the Hungarian Home Guard. Recruitment was carried out discreetly through closed Volksbund meetings, with the Hungarian authorities, ensuring that volunteers would not be discriminated against. The agreement also allowed men serving in the Royal Hungarian Army to apply for the Waffen-SS while on leave, with the provision that they could return to their units after registration. Volunteers acquired German citizenship upon enlistment and lost their Hungarian citizenship, while their families were supported by Germany. In addition, it was ensured that those deemed unfit or exempt would not suffer political or economic disadvantages. This agreement formalised the recruitment process, addressed concerns about citizenship loss, and encouraged further recruitment.

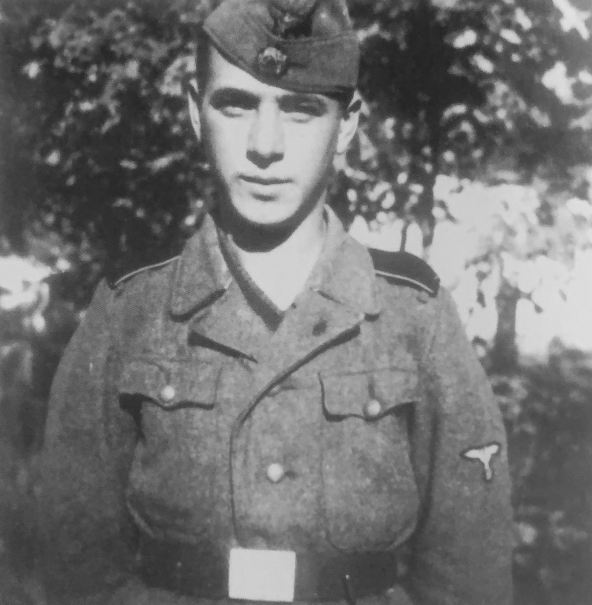
Matthias Trapp from Bački Brestovac, at the age of seventeen in September 1944, shortly after he had been assigned to the 78th Regiment in Zmajevo, which was being formed.

A third and final major recruitment drive followed an agreement signed on 14 April 1944, which broadened the definition of 'German' to include individuals who identified with German culture and nationality, even if they did not meet strict ethnic criteria. This shift marked a significant change in the relationship between Hungary and its ethnic German communities, as the military obligations of Hungary's ethnic Germans were transferred directly to Germany. It is estimated that between 80,000 and 100,000 men were recruited, of whom some 42,000 had enlisted by 25 August 1944. Many recruits joined divisions such as the 18th SS Volunteer Panzergrenadier Division and 22nd SS Volunteer Cavalry Division, while others were assigned to support roles such as police units. Recruitment intensified in September 1944, when all men born after 1927, especially from the Bačka region, were required to report for induction. The agreement formalised conscription for men over the age of 17, including skilled workers with military exemptions. Conscripts retained their Hungarian citizenship but acquired German citizenship for their service, and their families received social benefits. Despite this, the Hungarian Minister of Defence, Lajos Csatay, expressed concern about the social and military implications, particularly the backlash from Hungarian citizens forced into the Waffen-SS and the potential impact on military morale.

=== Kampfgruppe Syr ===
While the bulk of the division was still undergoing training in mid-late September and October, a small combat-ready part of the division, consisting of about 2,600 men, made up of ethnic Germans and Bosnian Muslims from the Kama Division, was given its first task at the end of September to secure the refugee columns on the banks of the Banat Tisza. These units were placed under the control of SS-Sturmbannführer Sepp Syr and named 'Kampfgruppe Syr' after him, taking up positions on the Tisza on 7 and 9 October 1944 to defend the Bačka. There was a small number of other units in the area such as the Brandenburg Division, along with multiple Hungarian River Blockade Detachments to stop the Red Army's advance.

The Kama Division at this time still existed alongside the 31st SS-Division, with attempts to reorganise and form a new Handschar and Kama Division. However, this was delayed as the 2,000 Bosnians who were supposed to be transferred by rail from Hungary to the Gradište-Županja area were deployed to the Tisza. After about a week of fighting on the front line, the Bosnians were soon disengaged and began moving to Bosnia, but one group mutinied on 17 October 1944, just before reaching the Croatian border, killing SS-Untersturmführer Fiedler and taking a large number of weapons, including machine guns and a substantial amount of ammunition. As a result, the remaining small number of Bosnians were used to resupply the 13th SS-Division, and the 23rd SS-Division was formally dissolved on 31 October 1944.

== Uniforms and Insignia ==
=== Uniforms ===
From the very beginning of the division's roots in the Kama Division, there was a shortage of uniforms and equipment in appropriate sizes, particularly for larger men. This issue was due to an air raid on a train transporting new uniforms and equipment from the Dachau Clothing Depot. Due to the lack of tunics, many personnel wore overcoats, which were impractical in the Balkan summer. Additionally, the destruction of a train cart carrying caps meant they had to wear their steel helmets at all times, including when off duty.

To mitigate these shortcomings, two belts were mended into one and many personnel wore more climate-appropriate clothing such as khaki tropical uniforms, shorts, field caps, and the rare SS M43 tropical 'Sahariana' uniform. There was also a shortage of boots, and in some cases some men were forced to walk around in slippers or civilian shoes, leading some to nickname the division the 'Sleeping Cap Division'.

The Division's standard issue uniform was most commonly an M42 field jacket, with some having M43 field jackets. Many of the NCOs and officers in the division had older M36 field jackets, which featured pleats and a bottle green collar. There were no unique collar tabs, arm shields or cuff titles awarded to the division.

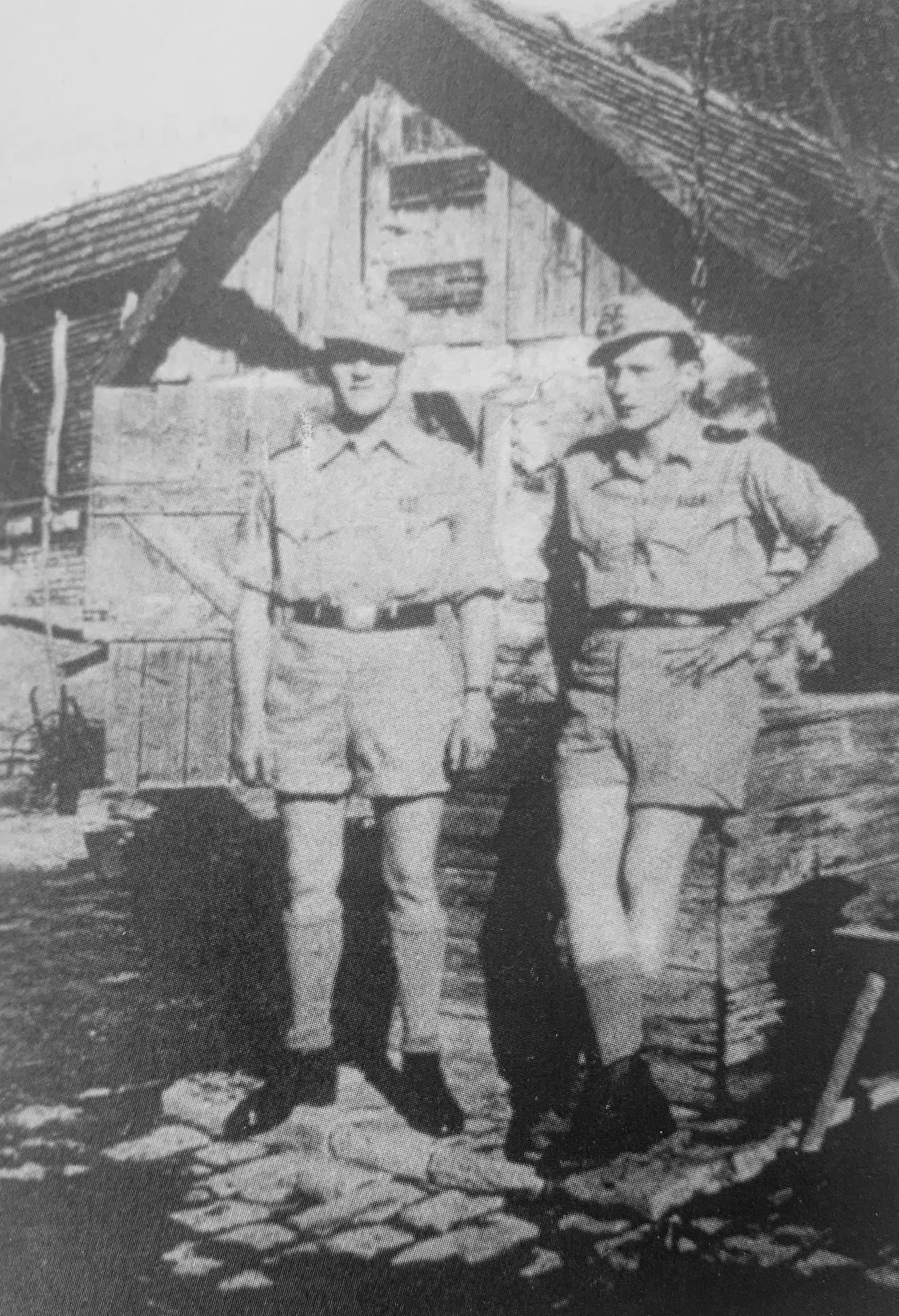
Officers from SS Volunteer Medical Abteilung 31 in Vrbas wearing khaki tropical uniforms, August 1944: SS-Rottenführer Peter Glitza (left) and SS-Rottenführer Ernest Bennert (right).

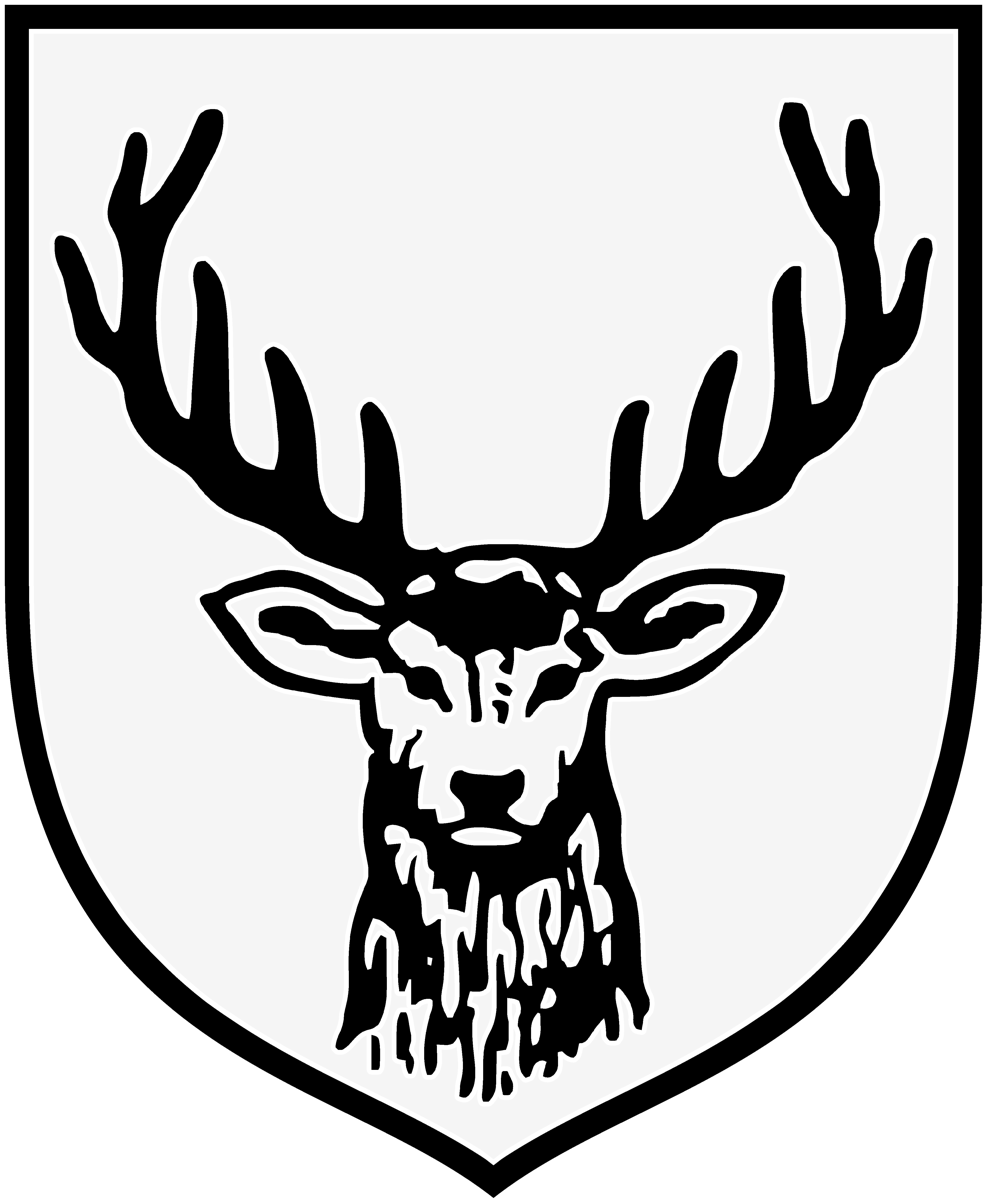
Divisional vehicle symbol of the 31st SS Volunteer Grenadier Division.

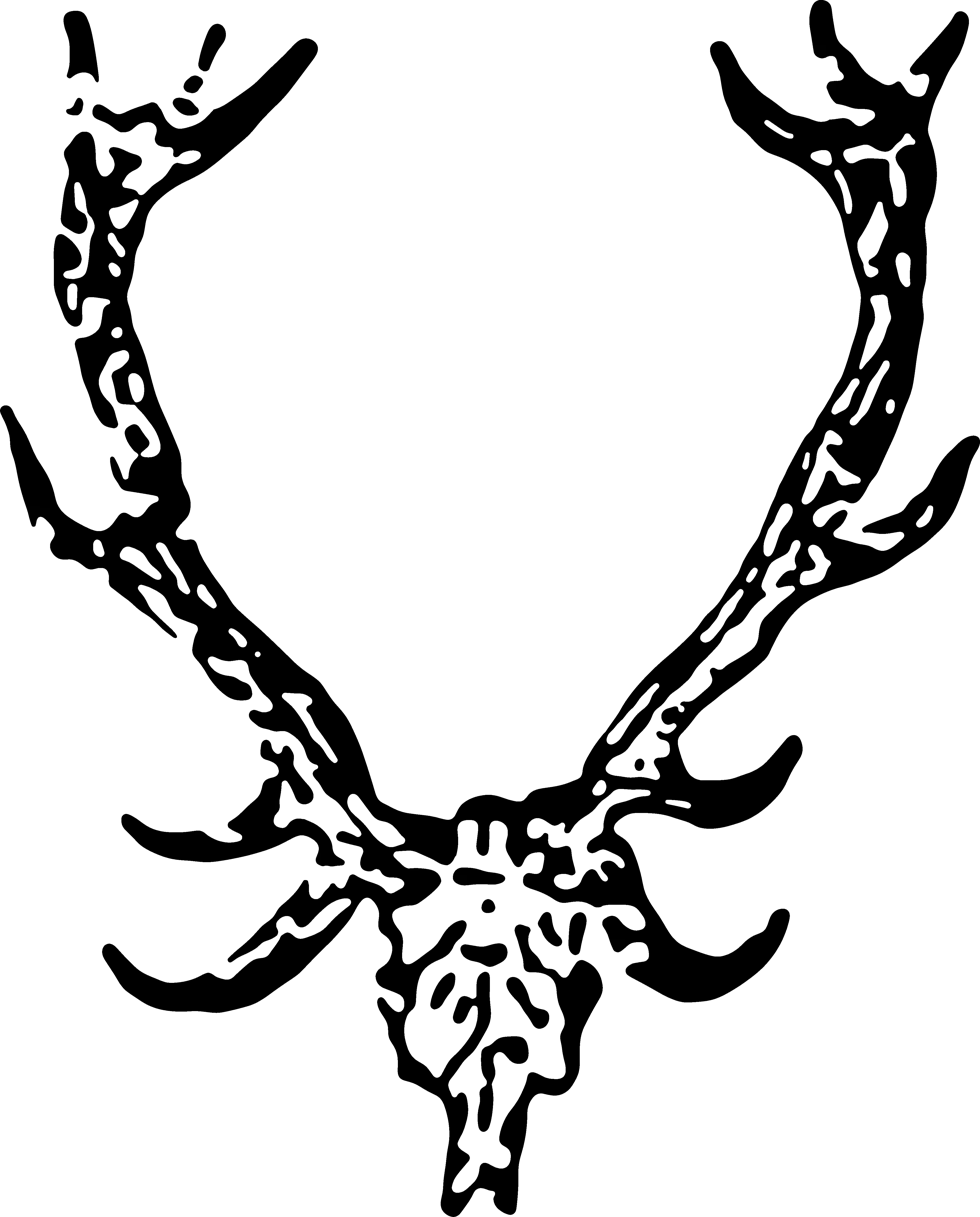
SS-Brigadeführer Gustav Lombard used a very similar stag's head on his personal letterheads after the war until his death in 1992.

=== Insignia ===
In the second half of October 1944, shortly after the Division was formed, a survey was carried out to find out what the insignia of the new Division should be. Several suggestions were made; the Medical Company suggested a corncob, while the Telephone Company submitted a sketch of a paprika pepper. Given Bačka's famous paprika cultivation and extensive maize fields, both suggestions were appropriate, however, it was finally decided by the division commander, Gustav Lombard, who was known to be a passionate hunter, that the insignia of the new 31st SS-Division would be a twelve-point stag's head. It began to be used as a divisional symbol on vehicles and elsewhere in early November 1944 and remained in use until the war ended in May 1945.

While working for the Allianz Insurance Company in Munich, Lombard continued to use a stag's head similar to that used by the Division throughout the war on his letterheads, the main difference being that it no longer had a shield and was of a much simpler design.

The division wore the standard sig-rune collar tab on the right side of the collar, which was only given to Germanic or ethnic German Waffen-SS divisions. However, many veterans of the 13th and 23rd SS Divisions continued to wear the older scimitar and sun-ray collar tabs and insignia, such as the Edelweiss sleeve patch which led some veterans to believe that they were still serving in the Mountain Division.

=== Nicknames ===
Unlike other Waffen-SS divisions, the 31st SS-Division never received an honorary title throughout its existence. Instead, it was given several unofficial nicknames, including "Bačka Division" (German: Division Batschka) (Hungarian: Bácska-Hadosztály) (Serbo-Croatian: Divizija Bačka), referring to the fact that the division was recruited and formed in the Bačka. "Corn Division" (German: Divizija Kukuruz) (Hungarian: Kukorica Hadosztály) (Serbo-Croatian: Divizija Kukuruz), referring to the division's predominantly peasant population from the granaries and maize fields of the Bačka. "Lombard Division" (German: Division Lombard) (Hungarian: Kukorica Hadosztály) (Serbo-Croatian: Divizija Lombard), which appears repeatedly in war diaries and refers to Gustav Lombard, the division commander. It was also briefly dubbed the "Sleeping Cap Division" (German: Schlafkappendivision) (Hungarian: Alvó sapka részleg) (Serbo-Croatian: Divizija Spavaća Kapa), referring to the shortages of equipment the division faced when it began training from August to October 1944.

=== Misconceptions ===
The division is sometimes referred to in post-war literature as "Bohemia and Moravia" (German: Böhmen und Mähren), however, this is incorrect. This association stems from post-war literature which erroneously linked the numberless Kampfgruppe, later called Kampfgruppe Bohemia-Moravia, with the titleless 31st SS-Division. Kampfgruppe Bohemia-Moravia (also known as Kampfgruppe Trabandt), was formed in the final stages of the war from the merger of two SS infantry brigades, 'Bohemia' and 'Moravia'. This took place between 8 April 1945 and 6 May 1945 under the command of SS-Brigadeführer Wilhelm Trabandt.

Trabandt himself argued that the division should logically have been called Bohemia and Moravia. However, due to the hasty formation of the unit and the lack of a formal name, the division remained nameless and unnumbered throughout its short existence. With some 3,178 men, the division earned the nickname "Kampfgruppe Böhmen-Mähren" and was later, in early historical research and at the first meetings of the HIAG Tracing Service, sometimes mistakenly associated with the numberless 31st SS-Division.

== Order of Battle ==
The formation order issued on 4 October 1944 stated that the 31st SS-Division was to be organised as a typical German infantry division, in the form of what the Germans called a "Type 1944 Infantry Division", consisting of 3 regiments with 3 battalions per regiment. With the exception and addition of an extra and third infantry regiment, it retained the old structure and field post numbers of the disbanded Kama Division. The new 31st SS Volunteer Grenadier Division was initially organised as follows:

=== Type 1944 Infantry Division Structure ===
==== Divisional Headquarters & Staff ====
Division Staff Company (19970)

- Motorised Mapping Office (19970A)
- SS Field Police Troop 31 (partially motorised) (19970B)
- (no musician band)

==== Infantry Units ====
SS Volunteer Grenadier Regiment 78

- Regimental Staff Company (45334A)
- Staff Company (45334B)
- 1st Battalion (1st – 4th Grenadier Companies) (36293)
- 2nd Battalion (5th – 8th Grenadier Companies) (20797)
- 3rd Battalion (9th – 12th Grenadier Companies) (44219)
- 13th Infantry Gun Company (with 2 heavy and 6 light infantry guns) (mortars) (21356A)
- 14th Panzerzerstörer Company (1 motorised Panzerjäger platoon with 3 x 7.5 cm Pak 40 anti-tank guns, and 2 Panzerzerstörer platoons) (21356B)

SS Volunteer Grenadier Regiment 79

- Regimental Staff Company (48865A)
- Staff Company (48865B)
- 1st Battalion (1st – 4th Grenadier Companies) (21714)
- 2nd Battalion (5th – 8th Grenadier Companies) (37565)
- 3rd Battalion (9th – 12th Grenadier Companies) (31579)
- 13th Infantry Gun Company (with 2 heavy and 6 light infantry guns) (mortars) (46452A)
- 14th Panzerzerstörer Company (1 motorised Panzerjäger platoon with 3 x 7.5 cm Pak 40 anti-tank guns, and 2 Panzerzerstörer platoons) (46452B)

SS Volunteer Grenadier Regiment 80

- Regimental Staff Company (26445A)
- Staff Company (26445B)
- 1st Battalion (1st – 4th Grenadier Companies) (24378)
- 2nd Battalion (5th – 8th Grenadier Companies) (33535)
- 3rd Battalion (9th – 12th Grenadier Companies) (40166)
- 13th Infantry Gun Company (with 2 heavy and 6 light infantry guns) (mortars) (40166A)
- 14th Panzerzerstörer Company (1 motorised Panzerjäger platoon with 3 x 7.5 cm Pak 40 anti-tank guns, and 2 Panzerzerstörer platoons) (40166B)

==== Specialised Infantry Units ====
SS Volunteer Fusilier Battalion 31

- Staff Company (22397A)
- 1st Motorcycle Company (22397B)
- 2nd – 3rd Fusilier Companies (bicycle-mounted) (22397C)
- 4th Heavy Weapons Company (22397D)

SS Volunteer Panzerjäger Battalion 31

- Staff Company (48064A)
- Mixed Staff Company (48064B)
- 1st Motorised Panzerjäger Company (9–12 guns) (48064C)
- 2nd Sturmgeschütz Company (10–14 guns, also known as a Sturmgeschütz Battalion) (48064D)
- 3rd Flak Company (12 x 2 cm Flugzeugabwehrkanone 30/38) (48064E)

SS Volunteer Artillery Regiment 31

- Regimental Staff Company (38377A)
- Staff Battery (38377B)
- 1st Battalion (1st – 3rd Batteries, 10.5 cm leFH 18) (34775)
- 2nd Battalion (4th – 6th Batteries, 10.5 cm leFH 18) (23497)
- 3rd Battalion (7th – 9th Batteries, 10.5 cm leFH 18) (47259)
- 4th Battalion (10th – 12th Batteries, 15 cm sFH 18) (32713)

==== Support & Logistics Units ====
SS Volunteer Pioneer Battalion 31

- Staff Company (43199A)
- 1st – 3rd Pioneer Companies (partially bicycle-equipped) (43199B)
- (no bridge-building column)

SS Volunteer Signals Battalion 31

- Staff Company (partially motorised with a messenger dog section) (39839A)
- 1st Telephone Company (partially motorised) (39839B)
- 2nd Radio Company (motorised) (39839C)
- Supply Troops Company 31 (partially motorised) (39839D)

SS Volunteer Field Replacement Battalion 31

- Staff Company (41036A)
- 1st – 5th Field Replacement Companies (41036B)
- Supply Troops Company 31 (41036C)

==== Medical & Administrative Units ====
SS Volunteer Medical Battalion 31

- Staff Company (42169A)
- 1st SS Volunteer Medical Company 31 (42169B)
- 2nd SS Volunteer Medical Company 31 (motorised) (42169C)
- SS Volunteer Motor Ambulance Company 31 (motorised) (42169D)

SS Volunteer Veterinary Company 31

- Staff Company (28248)

SS Volunteer Supply Troops Battalion 31

- Staff Company (motorised) (48519A)
- SS Bakery Company 31 (motorised) (48519B)
- SS Butchery Company 31 (motorised) (48519C)
- SS Administrative Company 31 (motorised) (48519D)
- SS Field Post Office 31 (motorised) (27578)

==== Workshop & Transport Units ====
SS Volunteer Motor Vehicle Workshop Company 31 (motorised) (25211)

SS Volunteer Supply Columns 31

- 1st – 2nd Supply Columns (motorised) (40349)
- 3rd – 4th Supply Columns (horse-drawn) (29101)
- SS Volunteer Supply Company 31 (30976)

== See also ==
- 13th Waffen Mountain Division of the SS Handschar (1st Croatian)
- 23rd Waffen Mountain Division of the SS Kama (2nd Croatian)
- Battle of Batina
- Danube Swabians
- List of German divisions in World War II
- List of SS personnel
- List of Waffen-SS divisions
- Table of ranks and insignia of the Waffen-SS
- Volksdeutsche
- Waffen-SS foreign volunteers and conscripts
