= Hugo Raithel =

German composer, conductor, and pianist (1932–2020)

Hugo Raithel (6 April 1932 – 12 September 2020) was a German composer, conductor and pianist.

== Life ==
Born in Schwarzenbach an der Saale, Raithel studied the piano at the Hochschule für Musik Köln from 1951 to '52 and from 1952 to '55 composition at the University of Music and Performing Arts Munich with Karl Höller, conducting with Fritz Lehmann and Kurt Eichhorn and piano with Johannes Hobohm and Friedrich Wührer. In 1955, he moved to the GDR, where he accepted a position as choir master at the Stadttheater Bautzen. From 1957 to '61 he was Solorepetitor at the Komische Oper Berlin and afterwards again in Bautzen as a theatre Kapellmeister. From 1978, he was a lecturer for repetition at the Hochschule für Musik Carl Maria von Weber. He was appointed professor in 1993 and retired in 1997.

Compositionally, he first took up Reger, but then went far beyond major/minor tonality. His mostly strongly polyphonic writing uses modal scales, among other things. Individual works also integrate dodecaphonic elements, such as his "Sinfonietta", Op. 18 (1963), inspired by a poem by Nâzım Hikmet.

Raithel composed a children's opera (Hase Nasehoch, based on a Russian fairy tale, 1981), incidental music, orchestral and choral works, songs and piano music. He lived in Liegau-Augustusbad together with his wife, the piano professor Monika Raithel (1940-2011). He died there in 2020 at the age of 88.
