= Paul Struck =

German-Austrian classical composer

Paul Friedrich Struck (6 December 1776 – 14 May 1820) was a German-Austrian classical composer.

== Biography ==
Struck was born in Stralsund, and began studying music in Berlin in 1792. In later years he studied with Johann Georg Albrechtsberger and then with Joseph Haydn in Vienna. In 1802 he settled in Vienna as a piano teacher. He later moved to Bratislava where he lived from 1817 until his death in 1820.

== Selected works ==
=== Vocal music ===
- "Mother's Birthday Party", (Vienna, 1797)
- "Cantate for Her Royal Majesty the Queen" for soprano and orchestra (1801)
- "Mourning Cantata on the Death of His Child" op. 16 (Vienna, 1817)
- 6 songs for soprano, alto tenor, bass

=== Instrumental Music ===
- Quatuor pour Clarinette, Violon (ou deux Violons), Alto & Violoncelle op. 12, Louis Maisch, Vienna, no date
- Sonata pour le Clavecin ou Piano-Forte avec accompagnement de Violon et Violoncelle op. 1 No. 1, op. 1 No. 2, op. 1 No. 3
- Trois Sonates pour le Clavecin ou Piano-Forte avec accompagnement de Flûte ou Violon et Violoncelle obl. Composées et dediées à Madame CE Struck par son fils Struck. Elève de J. Haydn. Op. 4. Jean André, Offenbach s / M., Undated
- Grand Duo op.7 (Sonata) pour le Pianoforte et Clarinette ou Violino, 1804, Vienna.
- Trois Sonates pour le Clavecin ou Piano-Forte avec accompagnement de Violon et Violoncelle composées et dédiées à Mr Joseph Haydn, Maitre de Chapelle de SA Monseigneur le Prince Esterhazy, par son Elève Paul Struck. Jean André, Offenbach, 1797.
- String Quartet op. 2
- Grand Trio pour le Piano-Forte, Violon et Violoncelle composee et dedie a Madame la Comtesse de Thürheim op. 3. Jean André, Offenbach s / M, no year
- Eight German dances for the pianoforte op. 13. Johann Traeg, Vienna, undated
- Three of his four symphonies are considered lost, only the 4th symphony op.10 was published by Offenbach publisher Johann Anton André.

== Literature ==
- Constantin von Wurzbach : Struck, Paul . In: Biographisches Lexikon des Kaiserthums Oesterreich . Part 40 Imperial royal court and state printing works, Vienna 1880, p. 104 (digitized).
- Joachim Lorenz Struck u. Ferdinand Struck: Stralsund Symphony. The life picture of the Stralsund composer Paul Struck . Elmenhorst / Vorpommern: Edition Pommern 2015, ISBN 978-3-939680-24-6
