= Letterhead =

Heading at the top of a sheet of letter paper stationery

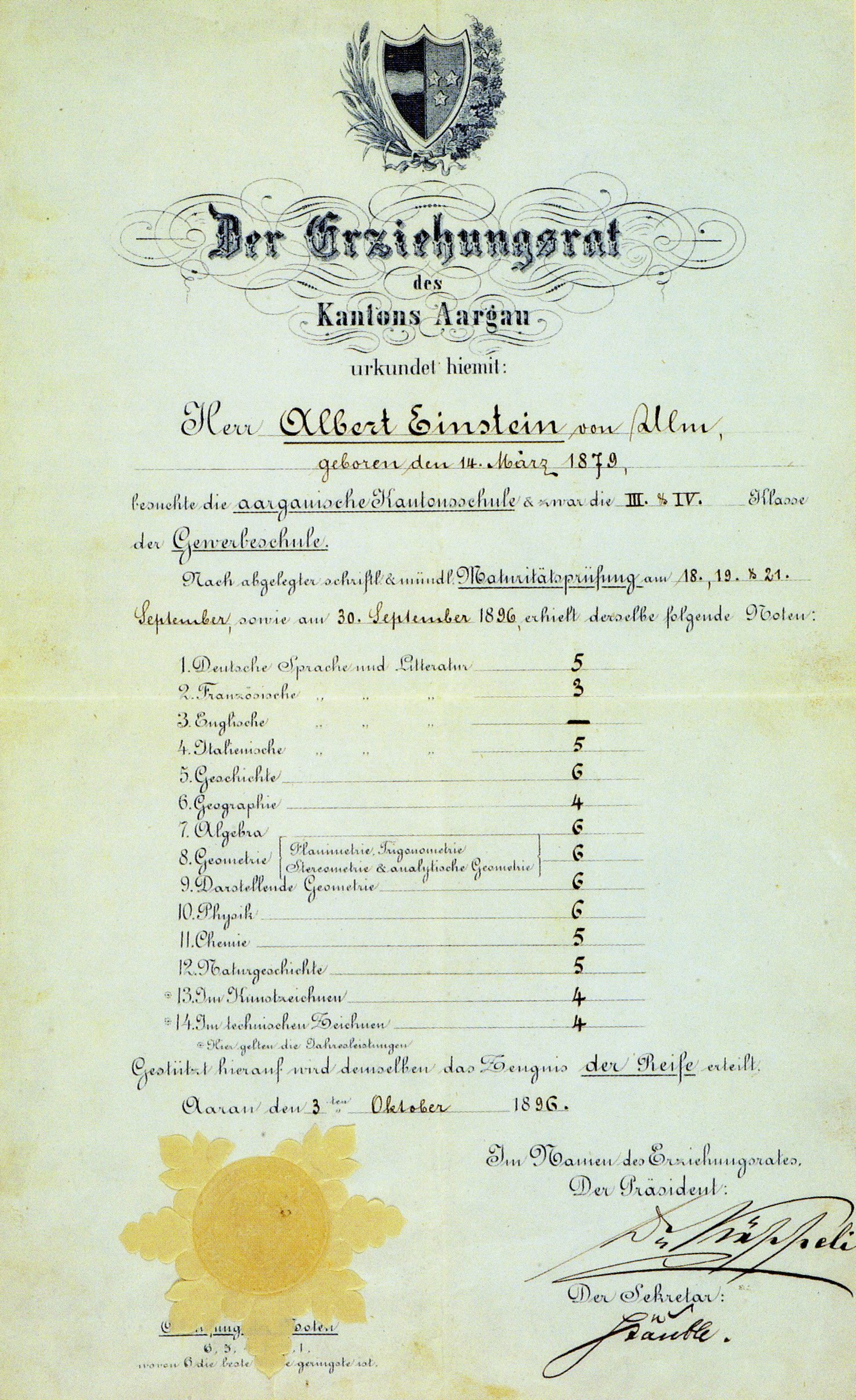
The certificate of maturity issued to Albert Einstein by the cantonal Education Council of Aargau, Switzerland, in 1896 (see letterhead).

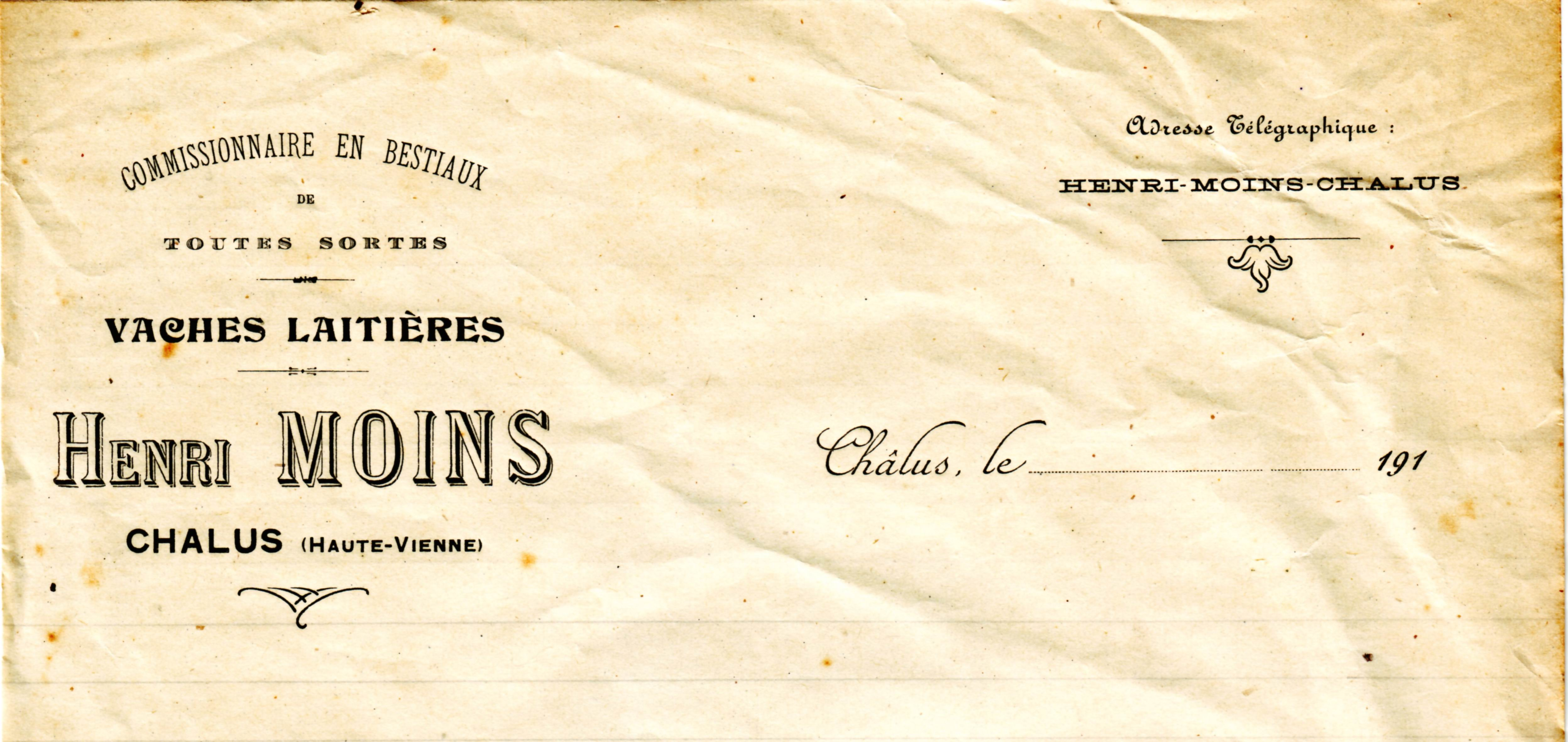
French letterhead paper from a cattle commerce company in 1910

A letterhead is the heading at the top of a sheet of letter paper (stationery). It consists of a name, contact details, logo or trademark, sometimes credentials such as a company or tax number, and sometimes a background pattern.

== Overview ==
Many companies and individuals prefer to create a letterhead template in a word processor or other software application. That generally includes the same information as pre-printed stationery but at lower cost. Letterhead can then be printed on stationery or plain paper, as needed, on a local output device or sent electronically.

Letterheads are generally printed by either the offset or letterpress methods. In most countries outside North America, company letterheads are printed A4 in size (210 mm x 297 mm). In North America, the letter size is typically 8.5 x 11 inches (215 x 280 mm).

Although modern technology makes letterheads very easy to imitate, they continue to be used as evidence of authenticity.

== Gallery ==
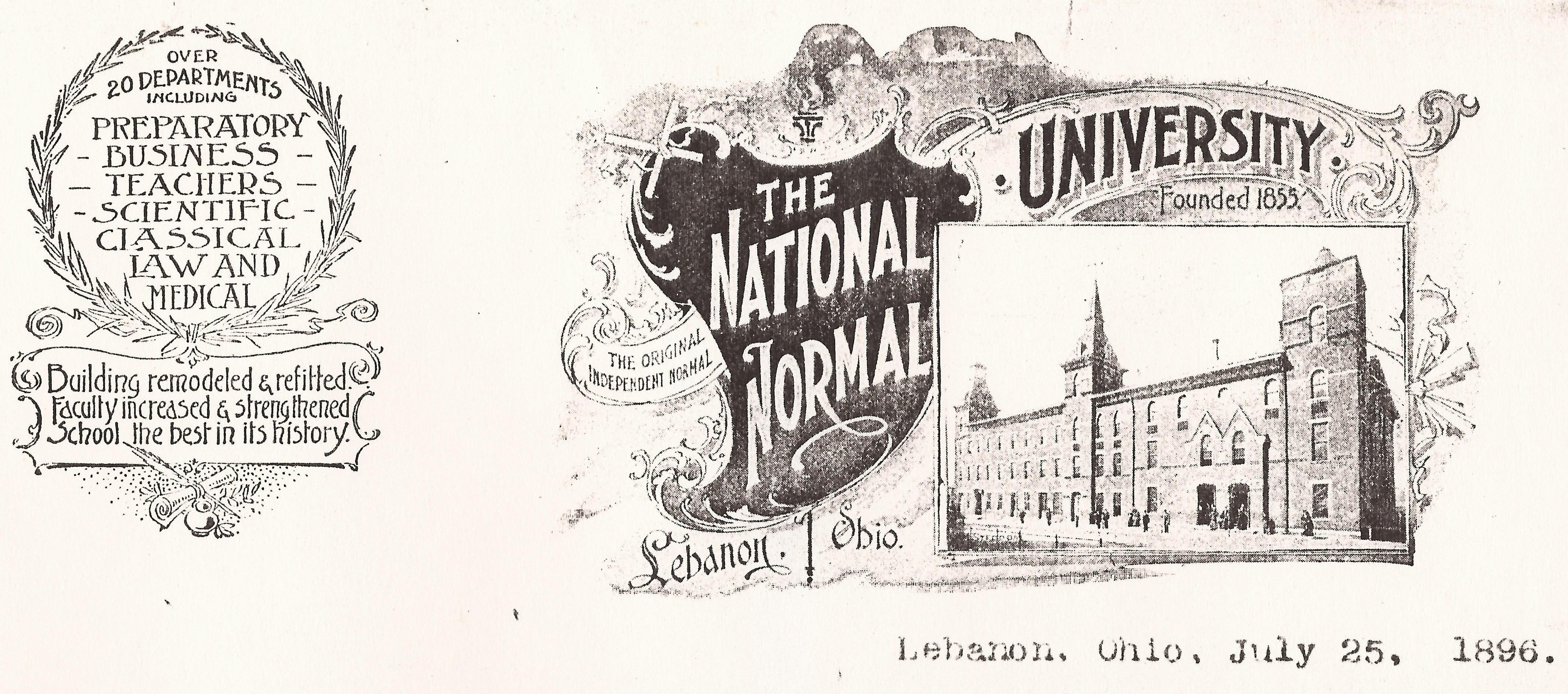
Letterhead (1896) for The National Normal University, Lebanon, Ohio, USA

Letterhead used by Infanta Elena of Spain, Duchess of Lugo

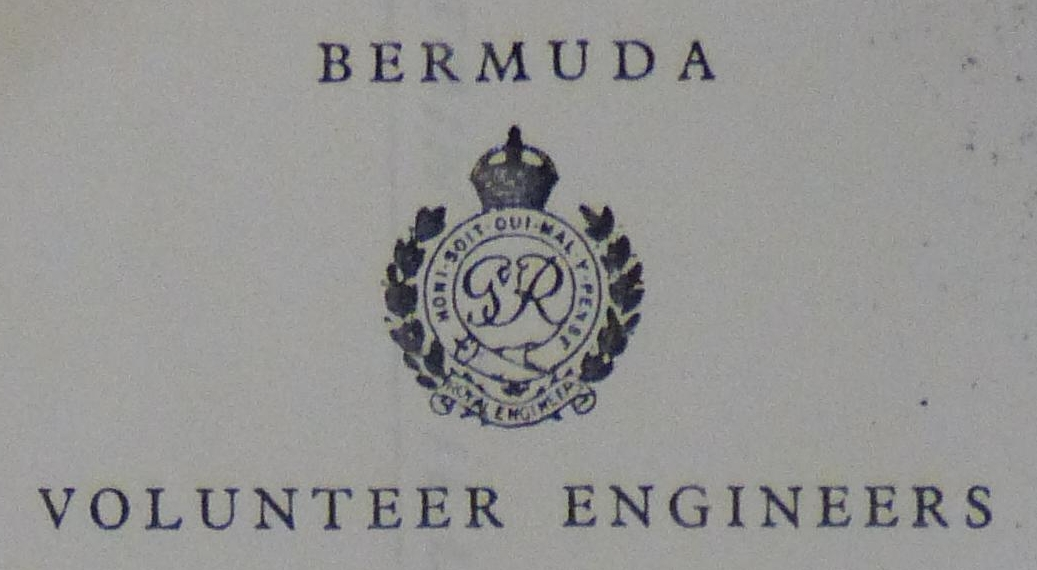
Stationery letterhead with the Bermuda Volunteer Engineers (Royal Engineers) insignia

== See also ==
- Document
- Documentation
