= Otto Reinhold =

German composer and music educator

Otto Reinhold (3 July 1899 – 27 August 1965) was a German composer and music educator

== Life ==
Born in Thum, Saxony, Reinhold attended the teachers' seminar in Annaberg-Buchholz from 1914 to 1920 and initially became a teacher in Neustädtel. In 1925, he began to teach in Leipzig with Hermann Grabner and to study composition. In 1929, he finished his studies and moved to Dresden, where he worked as a composer and music teacher until the end of his life. His works were especially popular in the German Democratic Republic and were partly recorded on vinyl.

His estate (227 catalogue numbers) is deposited in the music department of the Saxon State and University Library Dresden under the shelf mark: Mus.11705-.

== Sound language ==
According to Reinhold, he did not feel obliged to any particular style. He composed tonality with Gregorian mode insertion. His works are mostly concise, vital and melodic. He strove for comprehensibility and clear, self-contained form. The neoclassical tone of some of the works refers to Paul Hindemith in a softened form, which manifests itself particularly in Quartal and quintal harmony and playful intonation. Anton Bruckner also plays a certain role in the themes or treatment of the brass instruments. His Triptychon for orchestra is particularly well known. More modern compositional developments played no role in Reinhold's work.

Reinhold died in Dresden at the age of 66.

== Work ==
=== Orchestral pieces ===
- Symphony (1951)
- triptych (1954)
- Festive Prelude
- Symphonic ballad (1964)
- Dance Suite for piano and orchestra (1953/54)
- Violin Concerto
- flute concert
- Concertante music for flute, viola and orchestra (1963)
- Die Nachtigall, ballet (1958)

=== Chamber music ===
- string quartet (1960)
- Six pieces for string quartet
- piano trio (1948)
- Trio-Serenade for clarinet, viola and piano (1948)
- violin sonata
- Music for viola and piano
- Double Bass Studies with piano
- Piano music in three movements (1938)
- Dresden, piano music (1955)
