= Liegau-Augustusbad =

Coordinates: 51°08′16″N 13°53′15″E

Liegau-Augustusbad is a district of Radeberg, Landkreis Bautzen, Saxony. As of 2012 it had about 2000 inhabitants and is located on the Große Röder river on the northern edge of the Dresden Heath. Formerly named Liegau it was renamed Liegau-Augustusbad in 1922 to acknowledge the Augustusbad Spa in the district.

== Spas ==
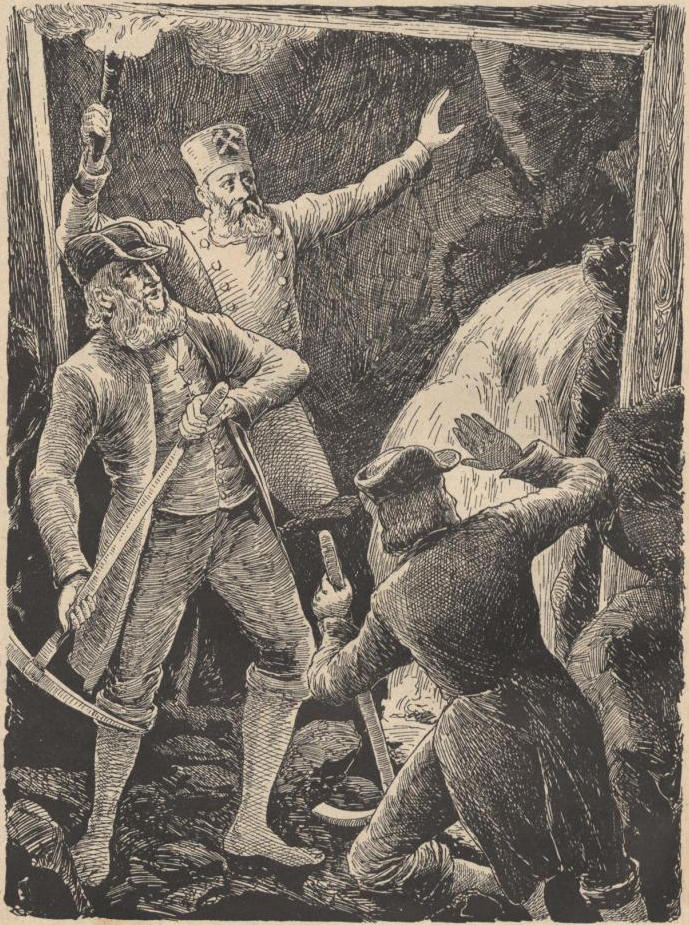
Discovery of the sopring in the former mine tunnels

The district formerly had a number of health spas, now closed and converted to other uses.

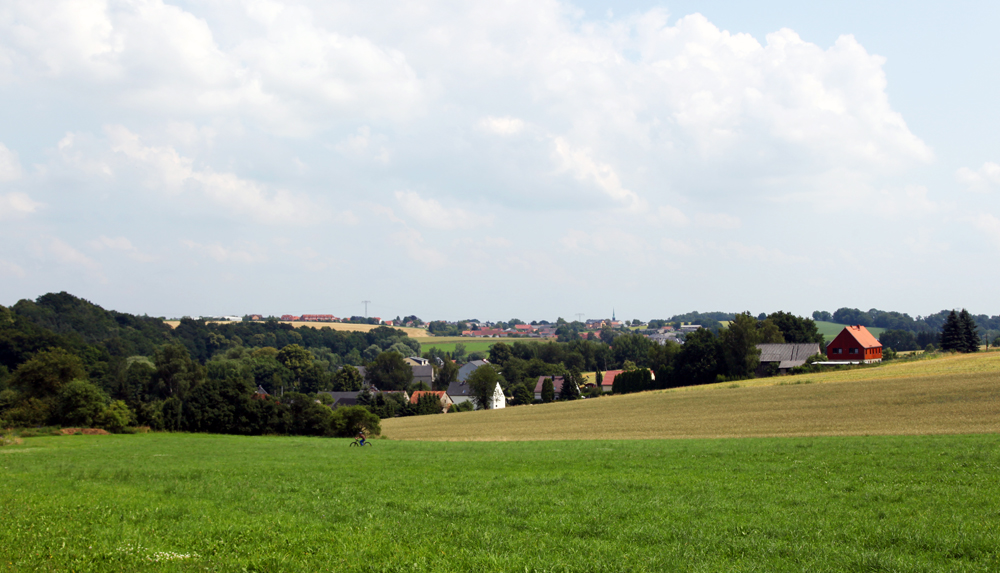

The Silberberg on the eastern edge of Liegau was criss-crossed by several mine tunnels dating back to the 16th century, from which silver was mined for a short time. In 1717 the mayor of the city of Radeberg, Christoph Seydel, discovered in this former tunnel some lightly carbonated veins of water. This discovery began the time of the (healing) baths in Liegau.

In a 1911 article the Encyclopedia Britannica described the Spa as follows:

AUGUSTUSBAD, a watering-place of Germany, in the kingdom of Saxony, 10 m. E. from Dresden, close to Radeberg, in a pleasant valley. Pop. 900. It has five saline chalybeate springs, used both for drinking and bathing, and specific in feminine disorders, rheumatism, paralysis and neuralgia. The spa is largely frequented in summer and has agreeable public rooms and gardens.

=== Augustusbad ===
The Augustusbad was named after Augustus the Strong, the Elector of Saxony, who had barrels of water from the springs delivered to his palace in Dresden for medicinal use. In 1896 the Leipzig pharmacist Doctor Willmar Schwabe purchased the spa and united it with other properties, forming a foundation for the poor and needy.

After the end of the Second World War in 1945 the spa was occupied by the Red Army. In 1959 it became public property of the DDR, and from 1959 until German reunification in 1989 it was used as a police training school. In 1992 the spa was transferred to the newly founded "Dr. Willmar Schwabesche Heimstättenstiftung" foundation. Unfortunately, after the healthcare reform in 1996, the attempt to revive the facility through construction of a new clinic and refurbishment of other buildings was stopped.

=== Herrmannsbad ===
The landowner Carl Herrmann discovered springs on his property in the 1840s. In 1852 he opened a bathhouse, in 1853 the Curbadrestaurant. In 1857, the Herrmannsbad in Liegau already consisted of a bathhouse with medical care and several buildings to accommodate the bathers. In 1878 a park-like garden was built at the bath. In the first half of the 20th century, the bath was closed and the buildings converted to residential use.

=== Flussbad an der Röder ===
The existence of a simple bathing place on the course of the Große Röder is already known as early as 1909. In 1922 the Flussbad an der Röder was officially opened by the local association and operated by the town council. Due to the opening of the new family bath the river bath was closed in 1931.

=== Familienbad ===
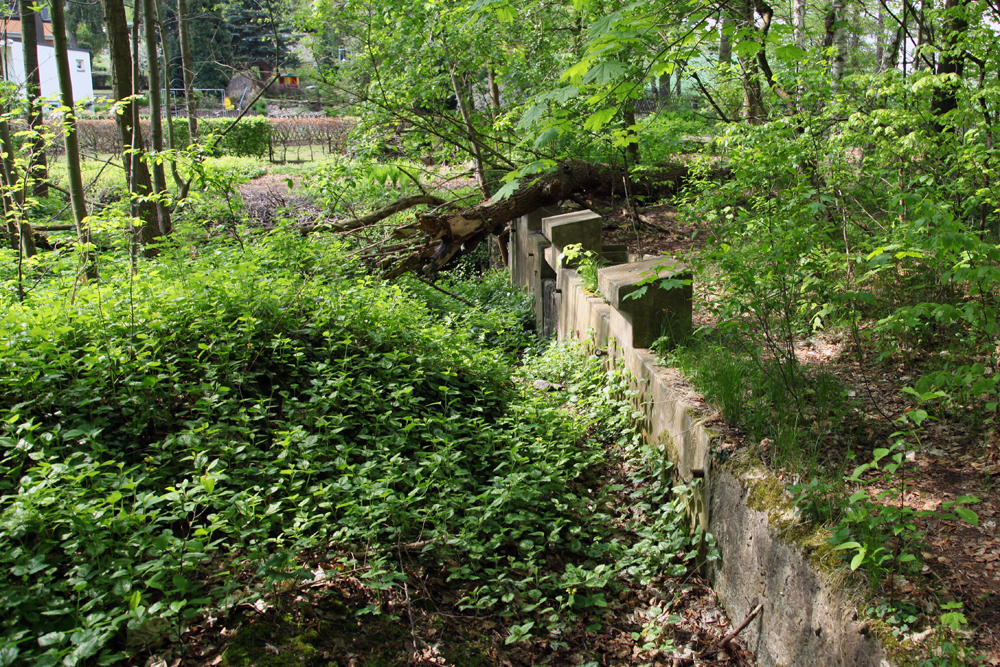
Remains of the Familienbad in 2014

In 1929 the Berliner Landparzellierungsgesellschaft (LAPAG) (Berlin Land Subdivision Company) built an outdoor swimming pool, the so-called "Family Bath" (Familienbad) . In the first few years, numerous events were held in the new outdoor pool, and it attracted large numbers of visitors. After the Second World War, the property was initially used as a children's camp and open-air stage. Necessary repairs to continue the bathing business failed. In the 1980s bungalows were built on a part of the former bathing area; another part was reused by the local fishing association for a pond. After the German reunification the remaining parts of the facility collapsed and were overgrown by the forest.
