= List of Waffen-SS division commanders =

This is a list of Waffen-SS division commanders.

== 1st SS Panzer Division "Leibstandarte SS Adolf Hitler" ==
Rank	Name	Service period
SS-Oberst-Gruppenführer	Josef Dietrich	15 August 1938 – 7 April 1943
SS-Brigadeführer	Theodor Wisch	7 April 1943 – 20 August 1944
SS-Brigadeführer	Wilhelm Mohnke	20 August 1944 – 6 February 1945
SS-Brigadeführer	Otto Kumm	6 February 1945 – 8 May 1945

== 2nd SS Panzer Division "Das Reich" ==
Rank	Name	Service period
SS-Oberst-Gruppenführer	Paul Hausser	19 October 1939 – 14 October 1941
SS-Obergruppenführer	Wilhelm Bittrich	14 October 1941 – 31 December 1941
SS-Obergruppenführer	Matthias Kleinheisterkamp	31 December 1941 – 19 April 1942
SS-Obergruppenführer	Georg Keppler	19 April 1942 – 10 February 1943
SS-Brigadeführer	Herbert-Ernst Vahl	10 February 1943 – 18 March 1943
SS-Oberführer	Kurt Brasack	18 March 1943 – 29 March 1943
SS-Obergruppenführer	Walter Krüger	29 March 1943 – 23 October 1943
SS-Gruppenführer	Heinz Lammerding	23 October 1943 – 24 July 1944
SS-Standartenführer	Christian Tychsen	24 July 1944 – 28 July 1944
SS-Brigadeführer	Otto Baum	28 July 1944 – 23 October 1944
SS-Gruppenführer	Heinz Lammerding	23 October 1944 – 20 January 1945
SS-Standartenführer	Karl Kreutz	20 January 1945 – 29 January 1945
SS-Gruppenführer	Werner Ostendorff	20 January 1945 – 9 March 1945
SS-Standartenführer	Rudolf Lehmann	9 March 1945 – 13 April 1945
SS-Standartenführer	Karl Kreutz	13 April 1945 – 8 May 1945

== 3rd SS Panzer Division "Totenkopf" ==
Rank	Name	Service period
SS-Obergruppenführer	Theodor Eicke	1 November 1939 – 7 July 1941
SS-Obergruppenführer	Matthias Kleinheisterkamp	7 July 1941 – 18 July 1941
SS-Obergruppenführer	Georg Keppler	18 July 1941 – 19 September 1941
SS-Obergruppenführer	Theodor Eicke	19 September 1941 – 26 February 1943
SS-Obergruppenführer	Hermann Priess	26 February 1943 – 27 April 1943
SS-Gruppenführer	Heinz Lammerding	27 April 1943 – 15 May 1943
SS-Gruppenführer	Max Simon	15 May 1943 – 22 October 1943
SS-Obergruppenführer	Hermann Priess	22 October 1943 – 21 June 1944
SS-Brigadeführer	Hellmuth Becker	21 June 1944 – 8 May 1945

== 4th SS Polizei Panzergrenadier Division ==
Rank	Name	Service period
SS-Gruppenführer	Konrad Hitschler	1 September 1940 – 8 September 1940
SS-Gruppenführer	Karl Pfeffer-Wildenbruch	8 September 1940 – 10 November 1940
SS-Gruppenführer	Arthur Mülverstedt	10 November 1940 – 10 August 1941
SS-Gruppenführer	Emil Höring	16 August 1941 – 18 August 1941
SS-Brigadeführer	Walter Krüger	18 August 1941 – 15 December 1941
SS-Standartenführer	Alfred Wünnenberg	15 December 1941 – 14 May 1942
SS-Oberführer	Alfred Borchert	15 May 1942 – 18 July 1942
SS-Brigadeführer	Alfred Wünnenberg	19 July 1942 – 10 June 1943
SS-Brigadeführer	Fritz Schmedes	10 June 1943 – 5 July 1943
SS-Standartenführer	Otto Binge	5 July 1943 – 18 August 1943
SS-Brigadeführer	Fritz Freitag	18 August 1943 – 20 October 1943
SS-Oberführer	Friedrich-Wilhelm Bock	20 October 1943 – 19 April 1944
SS-Brigadeführer	Jürgen Wagner	19 April 1944 – ? May 1944
SS-Oberführer	Friedrich-Wilhelm Bock	? May 1944 – 7 May 1944
SS-Brigadeführer	Herbert-Ernst Vahl	7 May 1944 – 22 July 1944
SS-Standartenführer	Karl Schümers	22 July 1944 – 16 August 1944
SS-Oberführer	Helmut Dörner	16 August 1944 – 22 August 1944
SS-Brigadeführer	Fritz Schmedes	22 August 1944 – 27 November 1944
SS-Standartenführer	Walter Harzer	27 November 1944 – 1 March 1945
SS-Standartenführer	Fritz Göhler	1 March 1945 – ? March 1945
SS-Standartenführer	Walter Harzer	? March 1945 – 8 May 1945

== 5th SS Panzer Division "Wiking" ==
Rank	Name	Service period
SS-Obergruppenführer	Felix Steiner	1 December 1940 – 1 May 1943
SS-Obergruppenführer	Herbert Gille	1 May 1943 – 6 August 1944
SS-Oberführer	Eduard Deisenhofer	20 July 1944 – 11 August 1944
SS-Standartenführer	Johannes-Rudolf Mühlenkamp	11 August 1944 – 9 October 1944
SS-Oberführer	Karl Ullrich	9 October 1944 – 5 May 1945

== 6th SS Mountain Division "Nord" ==
Rank	Name	Service period
SS-Brigadeführer	Richard Herrmann	28 February 1941 – 25 May 1941
SS-Obergruppenführer	Karl Maria Demelhuber	25 May 1941 – 21 September 1941
SS-Obergruppenführer	Georg Keppler	21 September 1941 – ? October 1941
SS-Obergruppenführer	Karl Maria Demelhuber	? October 1941 – 21 April 1942
SS-Obergruppenführer	Matthias Kleinheisterkamp	21 April 1942 – ? April 1942
SS-Oberführer	Hans Scheider	21 April 1942 – 15 June 1942
SS-Obergruppenführer	Matthias Kleinheisterkamp	15 June 1942 – 15 December 1943
SS-Gruppenführer	Lothar Debes	15 December 1943 – 20 May 1944
SS-Obergruppenführer	Friedrich-Wilhelm Krüger	20 May 1944 – 20 August 1944
SS-Brigadeführer	Gustav Lombard	20 August 1944 – 1 September 1944
SS-Gruppenführer	Karl-Heinrich Brenner	1 September 1944 – 2 April 1945
SS-Standartenführer	Franz Schreiber	2 April 1945 – 8 May 1945

== 7th SS Volunteer Mountain Division "Prinz Eugen" ==
Rank	Name	Service period
SS-Gruppenführer	Artur Phleps	30 January 1942 – 15 May 1943
SS-Brigadeführer	Karl von Oberkamp	15 May 1943 – 30 January 1944
SS-Brigadeführer	Otto Kumm	30 January 1944 – 20 January 1945
SS-Brigadeführer	August Schmidhuber	20 January 1945 – 8 May 1945

== 8th SS Cavalry Division "Florian Geyer" ==
Rank	Name	Service period
SS-Brigadeführer	Gustav Lombard	? March 1942 – ? April 1942
SS-Gruppenführer	Hermann Fegelein	? April 1942 – ? August 1942
SS-Obergruppenführer	Wilhelm Bittrich	? August 1942 – 15 February 1943
SS-Brigadeführer	Fritz Freitag	15 February 1943 – 20 April 1943
SS-Brigadeführer	Gustav Lombard	20 April 1943 – 14 May 1943
SS-Gruppenführer	Hermann Fegelein	14 May 1943 – 13 September 1943
SS-Gruppenführer	Bruno Streckenbach	13 September 1943 – 22 October 1943
SS-Gruppenführer	Hermann Fegelein	22 October 1943 – 1 January 1944
SS-Gruppenführer	Bruno Streckenbach	1 January 1944 – 14 April 1944
SS-Brigadeführer	Gustav Lombard	14 April 1944 – 1 July 1944
SS-Brigadeführer	Joachim Rumohr	1 July 1944 – 11 February 1945

== 9th SS Panzer Division "Hohenstaufen" ==
Rank	Name	Service period
SS-Obergruppenführer	Wilhelm Bittrich	15 February 1943 – 29 June 1944
SS-Standartenführer	Thomas Müller	29 June 1944 – 10 July 1944
SS-Brigadeführer	Sylvester Stadler	10 July 1944 – 31 July 1944
SS-Oberführer	Friedrich-Wilhelm Bock	31 July 1944 – 29 August 1944
SS-Oberführer	Walter Harzer	29 August 1944 – 10 October 1944
SS-Brigadeführer	Sylvester Stadler	10 October 1944 – 8 May 1945

== 10th SS Panzer Division "Frundsberg" ==
Rank	Name	Service period
SS-Standartenführer	Michael Lippert	? March 1943 – 15 February 1943
SS-Gruppenführer	Lothar Debes	15 February 1943 – 15 November 1943
SS-Gruppenführer	Karl Fischer von Treuenfeld	15 November 1943 – 27 April 1944
SS-Brigadeführer	Heinz Harmel	27 April 1944 – 28 April 1945
SS-Obersturmbannführer	Erwin Franz Roestel	28 April 1945 – 8 May 1945

== 11th SS Volunteer Panzergrenadier Division "Nordland" ==
Rank	Name	Service period
SS-Brigadeführer	Franz Augsberger	22 March 1943 – 1 May 1943
SS-Gruppenführer	Fritz von Scholz	1 May 1943 – 27 July 1944
SS-Brigadeführer	Joachim Ziegler	27 July 1944 – 25 April 1945
SS-Brigadeführer	Gustav Krukenberg	25 April 1945 – 8 May 1945

== 12th SS Panzer Division "Hitlerjugend" ==
Rank	Name	Service period
SS-Brigadeführer	Fritz Witt	31 July 1943 – 14 June 1944
SS-Standartenführer	Kurt Meyer	14 June 1944 – 6 September 1944
SS-Obersturmbannführer	Hubert Meyer	6 September 1944 – 24 October 1944
SS-Brigadeführer	Fritz Kraemer	24 October 1944 – 13 November 1944
SS-Brigadeführer	Hugo Kraas	13 November 1944 – 8 May 1945

== 13th Waffen Mountain Division of the SS "Handschar" (1st Croatian) ==
Rank	Name	Service period
SS Gruppenführer	Artur Phleps	13 February 1943 – 9 March 1943
SS-Standartenführer der Reserve	Herbert von Obwurzer	9 March 1943 – 1 August 1943
SS-Brigadeführer	Karl-Gustav Sauberzweig	1 August 1943 – 1 June 1944
SS-Brigadeführer	Desiderius Hampel	1 June 1944 – 12 May 1945

== 14th Waffen Grenadier Division of the SS "Galicia" (1st Ukrainian) ==
Rank	Name	Service period
SS-Gruppenführer	Walter Schimana	30 June 1943 – 20 November 1943
SS-Brigadeführer	Fritz Freitag	20 November 1943 – 22 April 1944
SS-Brigadeführer	Fritz Freitag	5 September 1944 – 24 April 1945

== 15th Waffen Grenadier Division of the SS (1st Latvian) ==
Rank	Name	Service period
SS-Brigadeführer	Peter Hansen	25 February 1943 – 1 May 1943
SS-Gruppenführer	Carl Graf von Pückler-Burghauss	1 May 1943 – 17 February 1944
SS-Brigadeführer	Nikolaus Heilmann	17 February 1944 – 21 July 1944
SS-Brigadeführer	Herbert von Obwurzer	21 July 1944 – 26 January 1945
SS-Oberführer	Eduard Deisenhofer	26 January 1945 – ??/??/????
SS-Oberführer	Adolf Ax	26 January 1945 – 15 February 1945
SS-Brigadeführer	Karl Burk	15 February 1945 – 2 May 1945

== 16th SS Panzergrenadier Division "Reichsführer-SS" ==
Rank	Name	Service period
SS-Gruppenführer	Max Simon	3 October 1943 – 24 October 1944
SS-Brigadeführer	Otto Baum	24 October 1944 – 8 May 1945

== 17th SS Panzergrenadier Division "Götz von Berlichingen" ==
Rank	Name	Service period
SS-Standartenführer	Otto Binge	3 October 1943 – ? January 1944
SS-Gruppenführer	Werner Ostendorff	? January 1944 – 15 June 1944
SS-Standartenführer	Otto Binge	16 June 1944 – 18 June 1944
SS-Brigadeführer	Otto Baum	18 June 1944 – 1 August 1944
SS-Standartenführer	Otto Binge	1 August 1944 – 29 August 1944
SS-Oberführer	Eduard Deisenhofer	30 August 1944 – 30 September 1944
SS-Standartenführer	Thomas Müller	30 September 1944 – ? September 1944
SS-Standartenführer	Gustav Mertsch	? September 1944 – ? October 1944
SS-Gruppenführer	Werner Ostendorff	21 October 1944 – 15 November 1944
SS-Standartenführer	Hans Lingner	15 November 1944 – 9 January 1945
SS-Standartenführer	Gerhard Lindner	9 January 1945 – 21 January 1945
SS-Standartenführer	Fritz Klingenberg	21 January 1945 – 22 March 1945
SS-Obersturmbannführer	Vinzenz Kaiser	22 March 1945 – 24 March 1945
SS-Standartenführer	Jacob Fick	24 March 1945 – 27 March 1945
SS-Oberführer	Georg Bochmann	27 March 1945 – 8 May 1945

== 18th SS Volunteer Panzergrenadier Division "Horst Wessel" ==
Rank	Name	Service period
SS-Brigadeführer	Wilhelm Trabandt	25 January 1944 – 3 January 1945
SS-Gruppenführer	Josef Fitzthum	3 January 1945 – 10 January 1945
SS-Oberführer	Georg Bochmann	10 January 1945 – ? March 1945
SS-Standartenführer	Heinrich Petersen	? March 1945 – 8 May 1945

== 19th Waffen Grenadier Division of the SS (2nd Latvian) ==
Rank	Name	Service period
SS-Oberführer	Friedrich-Wilhelm Bock	15 March 1944 – 13 April 1944
SS-Gruppenführer	Bruno Streckenbach	13 April 1944 – 8 May 1945

== 20th Waffen Grenadier Division of the SS (1st Estonian) ==
Rank	Name	Service period
SS-Brigadeführer	Franz Augsberger	? January 1944 – 19 March 1945
SS-Brigadeführer	Berthold Maack	20 March 1945 – 8 May 1945

== 21st Waffen Mountain Division of the SS "Skanderbeg" (1st Albanian) ==
Rank	Name	Service period
SS-Brigadeführer	August Schmidhuber	1 May 1944 – 20 January 1945

== 22nd SS Volunteer Cavalry Division ==
Rank	Name	Service period
SS-Brigadeführer	August Zehender	21 April 1944 – 11 February 1945

== 23rd Waffen Mountain Division of the SS "Kama" (2nd Croatian) ==
Rank	Name	Service period
SS-Standartenführer	Helmuth Raithel	1 July 1944 – 31 October 1944

== 23rd SS Volunteer Panzergrenadier Division "Nederland" ==
Rank	Name	Service period
SS-Sturmbannführer	Herbert Garthe	? November 1941 – ? February 1942
SS-Oberführer	Otto Reich	? February 1942 – 1 April 1942
SS-Obersturmbannführer	Arved Theuermann	1 April 1942 – ? July 1942
SS-Standartenführer	Josef Fitzthum	? July 1942 – 20 April 1944
SS-Brigadeführer	Jürgen Wagner	20 April 1944 – 8 May 1945

== 24th Waffen Mountain Division of the SS "Karstjäger" ==
Rank	Name	Service period
SS-Obersturmbannführer	Karl Marx	1 August 1944 – 5 December 1944
SS-Sturmbannführer	Werner Hahn	5 December 1944 – 10 February 1945
SS-Oberführer	Adolf Wagner	10 February 1945 – 8 May 1945

== 25th Waffen Grenadier Division of the SS "Hunyadi" (1st Hungarian) ==
Rank	Name	Service period
SS-Standartenführer	Thomas Müller	2 November 1944 – 27 November 1944
SS-Gruppenführer	József Grassy	27 November 1944 – 8 May 1945

== 26th Waffen Grenadier Division of the SS (2nd Hungarian) ==
Rank	Name	Service period
SS-Standartenführer	Rolf Tiemann	? November 1944 – ? November 1944
SS-Oberführer	Zoltan Pisky	? November 1944 – 23 January 1945
SS-Oberführer	László Deák	23 January 1945 – 29 January 1945
SS-Brigadeführer	Berthold Maack	29 January 1945 – 21 March 1945
SS-Gruppenführer	József Grassy	21 March 1945 – 8 May 1945

== 27th SS Volunteer Division "Langemarck" ==
Rank	Name	Service period
SS-Sturmbannführer	Michael Lippert	24 September 1941 – 2 April 1942
SS-Obersturmbannführer	Hans Albert von Lettow-Vorbeck	2 April 1942 – ? June 1942
SS-Hauptsturmführer	Hallmann	? June 1942 – 20 June 1942
SS-Obersturmbannführer	Josef Fitzthum	20 June 1942 – 11 July 1942
SS-Sturmbannführer	Conrad Schellong	11 July 1942 – 27 November 1944
SS-Oberführer	Thomas Müller	27 November 1944 – 8 May 1945

== 28th SS Volunteer Grenadier Division "Wallonien" ==
Rank	Name	Service period
Captain-Commandant	Georges Jacobs	? August 1941 – ? January 1942
SS-Hauptmann	B.E.M. Pierre Pauly	? January 1942 – ? March 1942
SS-Hauptmann	George Tchekhoff	? March 1942 – ? April 1942
SS-Sturmbannführer	Lucien Lippert	? April 1942 – 13 February 1944
SS-Oberführer	Karl Burk	13 February 1944 – 30 January 1945
SS-Obersturmbannführer	Léon Degrelle	30 January 1945 – 8 May 1945

== 29th Waffen Grenadier Division of the SS "RONA" (1st Russian) ==
Rank	Name	Service period
Unknown	Konstantin Voskoboinik	? October 1941 – ? January 1942
SS-Brigadeführer	Bronislav Kaminski	17 June 1944 – 19 August 1944
SS-Brigadeführer	Christoph Diehm	19 August 1944 – ? August 1944

== 29th Waffen Grenadier Division of the SS (1st Italian) ==
Rank	Name	Service period
SS-Brigadeführer	Peter Hansen	13 November 1943 – ? March 1944
SS-Obergruppenführer	Karl Wolff	? March 1944 – ? September 1944
SS-Brigadeführer	Pietro Mannelli	? September 1944 – ? September 1944
SS-Brigadeführer	Peter Hansen	? September 1944 – ? October 1944
SS-Standartenführer	Gustav Lombard	? October 1944 – 9 November 1944
SS-Standartenführer	Constantin Heldmann	9 November 1944 – ? January 1945
SS-Oberführer	Ernst Tzschoppe	? January 1945 – 8 May 1945

== 30th Waffen Grenadier Division of the SS (2nd Russian) ==
Rank	Name	Service period
SS-Standartenführer	Hans Siegling	18 August 1944 – 31 December 1944

== 30th Waffen Grenadier Division of the SS (1st Belarusian) ==
Rank	Name	Service period
Unknown	Rasdastu Astrouski	28 June 1944 – 8 May 1945

== 31st SS Volunteer Grenadier Division ==
Rank	Name	Service period
SS-Brigadeführer	Gustav Lombard	1 October 1944 – 8 May 1945

== 32nd SS Volunteer Grenadier Division "30 January" ==
SS-Commanders

Rank	Name	Service period
SS-Standartenführer	Johannes-Rudolf Mühlenkamp	30 January 1945 – 5 February 1945
SS-Standartenführer	Joachim Richter	5 February 1945 – 17 February 1945
SS-Oberführer	Adolf Ax	17 February 1945 – 15 March 1945
SS-Standartenführer	Hans Kempin	15 March 1945 – 8 May 1945

== 33rd Waffen Cavalry Division of the SS (3rd Hungarian) ==
Rank	Name	Service period
Unknown	Unknown	? December 1944 – 8 May 1945

== 33rd Waffen Grenadier Division of the SS "Charlemagne" (1st French) ==
Rank	Name	Service period
(LVF)	Roger Labonne	? August 1941 – 31 March 1942
Major	LaCroix/Demessine	1 April 1942 – 31 May 1943
SS-Oberführer	Edgar Puaud	1 June 1943 – ? August 1943
SS-Obersturmbannführer	Paul Gamory-Dubourdeau	? August 1943 – 31 July 1944
SS-Hauptsturmführer	Erich Kostenbader	1 August 1944 – ? August 1944
SS-Brigadeführer	Edgar Puaud	September 1944 – 28 February 1945
SS-Brigadeführer	Gustav Krukenberg	28 February 1945 – 25 April 1945
SS-Standartenführer	Walter Zimmermann	25 April 1945 – 8 May 1945

== 34th SS Volunteer Grenadier Division "Landstorm Nederland" ==
Rank	Name	Service period
SS-Oberführer	Viktor Knapp	11 May 1943 – 1 April 1944
SS-Obersturmbannführer	Deurheit	1 April 1944 – 5 November 1944
SS-Standartenführer	Martin Kohlroser	5 November 1944 – 8 May 1945

== 35th SS-Police Grenadier Division ==
Rank	Name	Service period
SS-Standartenführer	Ruediger Pipkorn	18 March 1945 – 8 May 1945

== 36th Waffen Grenadier Division of the SS ==
Rank	Name	Service period
SS-Brigadeführer	Fritz Schmedes	20 February 1945 – 8 May 1945

== 37th SS Volunteer Cavalry Division ==
Rank	Name	Service period
SS-Oberführer	Waldemar Fegelein	? February 1945 – ? March 1945
SS-Standartenführer	Karl Gesele	? March 1945 – 8 May 1945

== 38th SS Grenadier Division "Nibelungen" ==
Rank	Name	Service period
SS-Obersturmbannführer	Richard Schulze-Kossens	? March 1945 – 12 April 1945
SS-Standartenführer	Martin Stange	12 April 1945 – 8 May 1945
SS-Gruppenführer	Heinz Lammerding	Also assigned as commander, but never took up the post
SS-Obergruppenführer	Karl von Oberkamp	Also assigned as commander, but never took up the post

== See also ==
- List of Waffen-SS divisions
