= List of Waffen-SS divisions =

All Waffen-SS divisions were ordered in a single series of numbers as formed, regardless of type. Those with ethnic groups listed were at least nominally recruited from those groups. Many of the higher-numbered units were divisions in name only, being in reality only small battlegroups (Kampfgruppen).

As a general rule, an "SS Division" was made up of mostly Germans, or other Germanic people, while a "Division of the SS" was made up of mostly non-Germanic volunteers and conscripts.

== Waffen-SS divisions by number ==
Number	Name (in German)	Ethnic composition	Named after	Years active	Insignia	Maximum manpower
1st	1. SS-Panzer-Division „Leibstandarte SS Adolf Hitler“ (LSSAH)	Germans	Life Regiment Adolf Hitler	1933–1945		22,000 (1944)
2nd	2. SS-Panzer-Division „Das Reich“	Germans	Greater Germanic Reich	1939–1945		19,021 (1941)
3rd	3. SS-Panzer-Division „Totenkopf“	Germans	Totenkopf	1939–1945		18,754 (1941)
4th	4. SS-Polizei-Panzergrenadier-Division	Germans	Ordnungspolizei	1939–1945		17,347 (1941)
5th	5. SS-Panzer-Division „Wiking“	Germans, Norwegians, Danes, Swedes, Icelanders, Finns, Estonians, Dutch, Flemish, Walloons, and Swiss	Vikings	1940–1945		19,377 (1941)
6th	6. SS-Gebirgs-Division „Nord“	Germans, Norwegians, Swiss	North	1941–1945		15,000 (1943)
7th	7. SS-Freiwilligen-Gebirgs-Division „Prinz Eugen“	Germans, ethnic Germans from Banat, Croatia, Hungary, and Romania	Prince Eugene of Savoy	1941–1945		18,000 (1943)
8th	8. SS-Kavallerie-Division „Florian Geyer“	Germans	Florian Geyer	1941–1945		15,000 (1944)
9th	9. SS-Panzer-Division „Hohenstaufen“	Germans	Hohenstaufen dynasty	1943–1945		19,611 (1943)
10th	10. SS-Panzer-Division „Frundsberg“	Germans	Georg von Frundsberg	1943–1945		19,313 (1943)
11th	11. SS-Freiwilligen-Panzergrenadier-Division „Nordland“	Germans; ethnic Germans from Romania; Swedes; Danes; Norwegians	Northland	1943–1945		11,749 (1943)
12th	12. SS-Panzer-Division „Hitlerjugend“	Germans	Hitler Youth	1943–1945		21,482 (1943)
13th	13. Waffen-Gebirgs-Division der SS „Handschar“ (kroatische Nr. 1)	Bosniaks; Croats; Albanians; ethnic Germans from Croatia	Khanjar dagger	1943–1945		21,000 (1943)
14th	14. Waffen-Grenadier-Division der SS (galizische Nr. 1), later (ukrainische Nr. 1)	Ukrainians	Galicia	1943–1945		22,000 (1945)
15th	15. Waffen-Grenadier-Division der SS (lettische Nr. 1)	Latvians		1943–1945		18,000 (1943)
16th	16. SS-Panzergrenadier-Division „Reichsführer SS“	Germans	Reichsführer-SS (Heinrich Himmler)	1943–1945		17,500 (1943)
17th	17. SS-Panzergrenadier-Division „Götz von Berlichingen“	Germans	Götz von Berlichingen	1943–1945		18,354 (1944)
18th	18. SS-Freiwilligen-Panzergrenadier-Division „Horst Wessel“	Ethnic Germans from Hungary	Horst Wessel	1944–1945		11,000 (1944)
19th	19. Waffen-Grenadier-Division der SS (lettische Nr. 2)	Latvians		1944–1945		11,000 (1944)
20th	20. Waffen-Grenadier-Division der SS (estnische Nr. 1)	Estonians		1944–1945		15,000 (1944)
21st	21. Waffen-Gebirgs-Division der SS „Skanderbeg“ (albanische Nr. 1)	Albanians	Skanderbeg	1944–1945		6,500 (1944)
22nd	22. SS-Freiwilligen-Kavallerie-Division	Ethnic Germans from Hungary		1944–1945		8,000 (1944)
23rd	23. Waffen-Gebirgs-Division der SS „Kama“ (kroatische Nr. 2)	Croats and Bosniaks	Kama dagger	1944		2,199 (1944)
23rd	23. SS-Freiwilligen-Panzergrenadier-Division „Nederland“ (niederländische Nr. 1)	Dutch	Netherlands	1941–1945		6,000 (1944)
24th	24. Waffen-Gebirgs-(Karstjäger-)Division der SS	Germans; ethnic German volunteers from Italy and Slovenia	Karst topography	1942–1945		4,000 (1944)
25th	25. Waffen-Grenadier-Division der SS „Hunyadi“ (ungarische Nr. 1)	Hungarians	John Hunyadi	1944–1945		15,000 (1944)
26th	26. Waffen-Grenadier-Division der SS (ungarische Nr. 2)	Hungarians	Hungary	1944–1945		10,000 (1944)
27th	27. SS-Freiwilligen-Grenadier-Division „Langemarck“ (flämische Nr. 1)	Flemish	Battle of Langemarck (1917)	1943–1945		8,000 (1944)
28th	28. SS-Freiwilligen-Panzergrenadier-Division „Wallonien“ (wallonische Nr. 1)	Walloons		1943–1945		5,000 (1944)
29th	Russische Volksbefreiungsarmee /29. Waffen-Grenadier-Division der SS „RONA“ (russische Nr. 1)	Russians	Russian People's Liberation Army (RONA)	1941–1944		13,000 (1943)
29th	29. Waffen-Grenadier-Division der SS „Italia“ (italienische Nr. 1)	Italians		1944–1945		11,000 (1944)
30th	30. Waffen-Grenadier-Division der SS (russische Nr. 2), later (weißruthenische Nr. 1)	Belarusians	White Ruthenia	1944–1945		11,000 (1944)
31st	31. SS-Freiwilligen-Grenadier-Division	Ethnic Germans mostly from Hungary and Yugoslavia		1944–1945		11,000 (1944)
32nd	32. SS-Freiwilligen-Grenadier-Division „30. Januar“	Germans	Date of Hitler becoming Chancellor (Note: Also date of formation.)	1945		12,000 (1945)
33rd	33. Waffen-Kavallerie-Division der SS (ungarische Nr. 3)	Hungarians		1944–1945		
33rd	33. Waffen-Grenadier-Division der SS „Charlemagne“ (französische Nr. 1)	French	Charlemagne	1944–1945		7,340 (1945)
34th	34. SS-Freiwilligen-Grenadier-Division „Landstorm Nederland“ (niederländische Nr. 2)	Dutch	Netherlands Landsturm	1943–1945		
35th	35. SS- und Polizei-Grenadier-Division	Germans	Ordnungspolizei	1945		
36th	36. Waffen-Grenadier-Division der SS	Germans		1945		5,000 (1945)
37th	37. SS-Freiwilligen-Kavallerie-Division	Germans; ethnic Germans from Hungary		1945		
38th	38. SS-Grenadier-Division „Nibelungen“	Germans	Nibelung	1945		7,000

=== Also ===
Number	Name (in German)	Ethnic composition	Named after	Years active	Insignia	Maximum manpower
—	Panzer-Division Kempf (Note: A temporary unit of mixed Heer and SS-Verfügungstruppe components.)	Germans	General der Panzertruppe; Werner Kempf	1939		164–180 tanks
—	SS-Kampfgruppe „Böhmen-Mähren“	Germans	Protectorate of Bohemia and Moravia	1944–1945		3 regimental sized units and an artillery regiment (on paper)
1st Cossack	1. Kosaken-Kavallerie-Division	Cossacks		1943–1945		17,500
2nd Cossack	2. Kosaken-Kavallerie-Division	Cossacks		1944–1945		
—	Waffen-Grenadier Regiment der SS (rumänisches Nr. 1)	Romanians		1944–1945		12,000
—	Waffen-Grenadier Regiment der SS (bulgarisches Nr. 1)	Bulgarians		1944–1945		
—	Serbisches Freiwilligen-Korps	Serbs		1944–1945		9,886

=== Planned and authorized but never formed ===
Number	Name (in German)	Named after	Notes
3rd Cossack	3. Kosaken-Plastun-Division	Cossack plastun	Planned to be formed from the Plastun Brigade of the XV SS Cossack Cavalry Corps, which consisted of two plastun regiments.
39th	39. Waffen-Gebirgs-Division der SS „Andreas Hofer“	Andreas Hofer	
40th	40. SS-Panzergrenadier-Division „Feldherrnhalle“	Feldherrnhalle	
41st	41. Waffen-Grenadier-Division der SS „Kalevala“ (finnische Nr. 1)	Kalevala	Planned to be formed from the Finnish Volunteer Battalion of the Waffen-SS after its dissolution. However, only a small amount of Finns (company-sized) defected after the Moscow Armistice. More recruits were expected for the eventuality that the Soviet Union fully occupied Finland, but this never came to pass.
42nd	42. Waffen-Grenadier-Division der SS „Niedersachsen“	Lower Saxony	
43rd	43. Waffen-Grenadier-Division der SS „Reichsmarschall“	Reichsmarschall (Hermann Göring)	
44th	44. SS-Panzergrenadier-Division „Wallenstein“	Albrecht von Wallenstein	Planned to be formed from Kampfgruppe Wallenstein, a unit formed from the SS-Truppenübungsplatz Böhmen training area in Bohemia. Kampfgruppe Wallenstein was used to suppress the Prague uprising.
45th	45. Waffen-Grenadier-Division der SS „Waräger“	Varangians	Named after Vikings who settled in present-day Belarus, Russia and Ukraine. Shared its name with the 1st SS Special Regiment Waräger, which was primarily composed of Russians.

== See also ==
- Allgemeine-SS regional commands (for General SS commands and formations)
- List of Waffen-SS division commanders
- List of Waffen-SS units
- Register of SS leaders in general's rank
- SS Panzer Division order of battle
