= Friedrich-Wilhelm Bock =

WW2 German SS officer (1897–1978)

- Born: 6 May 1897
- Died: 11 March 1978 (aged 80)
- Allegiance: Nazi Germany
- Branch: Waffen-SS
- Service years: 1915–1945
- Rank: SS-Oberführer
- Commands: SS Division Hohenstaufen, 4th SS Polizei Division, 19.Waffen-Grenadier-Division der SS; Waffen Grenadier Division of the SS (2nd Latvian)
- Conflicts: World War II
- Awards: Knight's Cross of the Iron Cross with Oak Leaves

Friedrich-Wilhelm Bock (6 May 1897 – 11 March 1978) was a German Waffen-SS commander during World War II who led three SS divisions, the SS Division Hohenstaufen, 4th SS Polizei Division, Waffen Grenadier Division of the SS (2nd Latvian). He was awarded the Knight's Cross of the Iron Cross of Nazi Germany.

== Awards ==
- Iron Cross (1914) 2nd Class (27 July 1917)
- Honour Cross of the World War 1914/1918 (1934)
- Clasp to the Iron Cross (1939) 2nd Class (21 August 1941)
- Iron Cross (1939) 1st Class (16 September 1941)
- Knight's Cross of the Iron Cross with Oak Leaves
  - Knight's Cross on 28 March 1943 as SS-Obersturmführer and Oberstleutnant of the Schupo and commander of the II./SS-Polizei-Artillerie-Regiment 4
  - 570th Oak Leaves on 2 September 1944 as SS-Oberführer and commander of the 9. SS-Panzer-Division "Hohenstaufen"

Military offices
Preceded by SS-Brigadeführer Fritz Freitag	Commander of 4th SS Polizei Division; 20 October 1943 – 19 April 1944	Succeeded by SS-Brigadeführer Jürgen Wagner
Preceded by SS-Gruppenführer Hinrich Schuldt	Commander of 19.Waffen-Grenadier-Division der SS; 15 March 1944 – 13 April 1944	Succeeded by SS-Obergruppenführer Bruno Streckenbach
Preceded by SS-Brigadeführer Jürgen Wagner	Commander of 4th SS Polizei Division; May 1944 – 7 May 1944	Succeeded by SS-Brigadeführer Hebert-Ernst Vahl
Preceded by SS-Brigadeführer Sylvester Stadler	Commander of 9th SS Panzer Division Hohenstaufen; 31 July 1944 – 29 August 1944	Succeeded by SS-Oberführer Walter Harzer
