= Wilhelm Bittrich =

Nazi German military officer

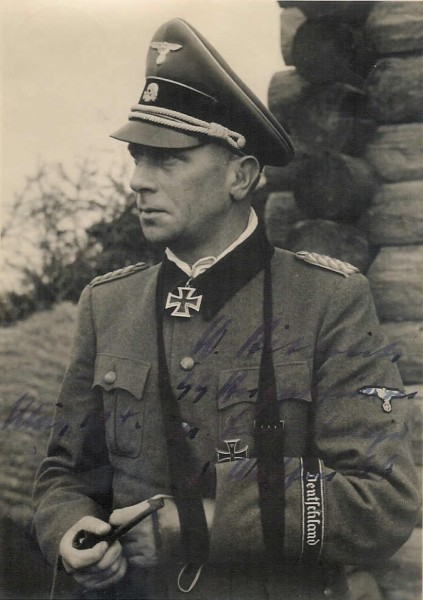
- Bittrich in 1942
- Born: 26 February 1894; Wernigerode, German Empire
- Died: 19 April 1979 (aged 85); Wolfratshausen, West Germany
- Military career
- Allegiance: German Empire; Weimar Republic; Nazi Germany
- Branch: Prussian Army; Luftstreitkräfte; Reichswehr; Schutzstaffel; Waffen-SS
- Service years: 1914–1945
- Rank: SS-Obergruppenführer und General der Waffen-SS
- Service number: NSDAP #829,700; SS #39,177
- Commands: SS Cavalry Division Florian Geyer; 2nd SS Panzer Corps
- Conflicts: See battles World War I: Western Front; Italian Front; World War II: Invasion of Poland; Battle of France; Eastern Front; Operation Market Garden; Battle of the Bulge
- Awards: Knight's Cross of the Iron Cross with Oak Leaves and Swords Clasp to the Iron Cross

Wilhelm Bittrich (26 February 1894 – 19 April 1979) was a high-ranking Waffen-SS commander of Nazi Germany. Between August 1942 and February 1943, Bittrich commanded the SS Cavalry Division Florian Geyer, in rear security operations (Bandenbekämpfung, literally: "gang fighting") in the Soviet Union. From July 1944 until the end of the war Bittrich commanded the 2nd SS Panzer Corps in Normandy, during Market Garden and in Hungary.

After his arrest in May 1945, Bittrich was extradited to France to stand trial for allegedly ordering the executions of 17 members of the French Resistance. After being convicted of less serious charges in relation to the executions, Bittrich was sentenced to five years in prison. Following his release, he became active in HIAG, a revisionist organization and a lobby group of former Waffen-SS members and served as chairman during the 1970s.

== World War I and inter-war career ==
Born in 1894 into the family of a traveling salesman, Bittrich volunteered for military service after the outbreak of World War I. He served on the Western and Italian Front and was awarded both classes of the Iron Cross. In 1916, Bittrich transferred to the Luftstreitkräfte and trained as a pilot. He served with several units, including the 37th Fighter Squadron.

From March to July 1919, he was a member in the paramilitary Freikorps under the General Bernhard von Hülsen during the German Revolution of 1918–19. In 1923, Bittrich was accepted into the Reichswehr of the Weimar Republic. In December 1931 or early 1932, Bittrich joined the Nazi Party (NSDAP) (Nr. 829,700). From March until June 1932, he served in the Sturmabteilung (SA). On 1 July 1932, Bittrich joined the SS (Nr. 39,177) and served in various SS units in leadership positions, reaching the rank of Hauptsturmführer by June 1934.

From August 1934, Bittrich was a commander of the Politische Bereitschaft (Political Readiness Detachment) in Hamburg. This unit later became part of the SS-Standarte "Germania" in the SS-Verfügungstruppe (SS-VT). By January 1938, Bittrich was promoted to Obersturmbannführer. He was given command of a battalion in the SS-Regiment "Deutschland". With this unit he participated in the annexation of Austria into Nazi Germany in March 1938. In May 1939, Bittrich was posted to the headquarters unit of the Leibstandarte SS Adolf Hitler (LSSAH) and was promoted to Standartenführer in June 1939.

== World War II ==
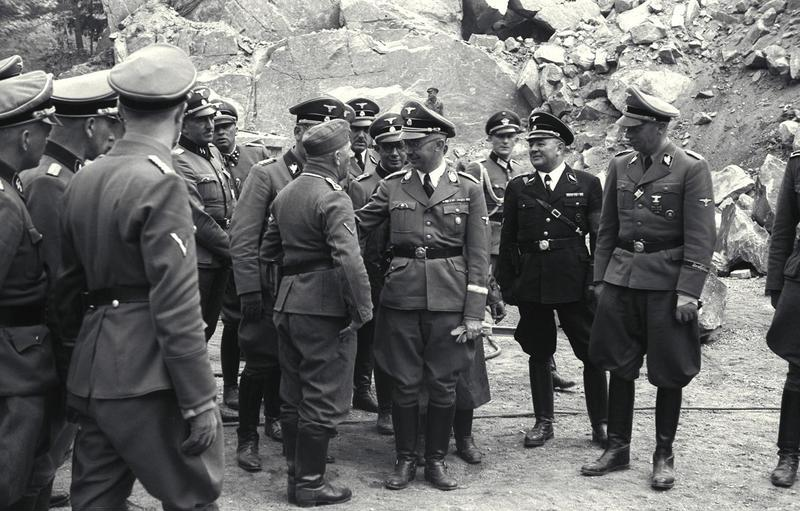
Bittrich (far right) at the Mauthausen-Gusen concentration camp during tour with Heinrich Himmler (center), June 1941.

He took part in the invasion of Poland (1939), assigned as LSSAH Chief of Staff to Sepp Dietrich. From January 1940 to October 1941 he was commander of the Regiment "Deutschland" and fought in the battle of France. From the summer of 1942 to February 1943, Bittrich commanded SS Cavalry Division Florian Geyer, that was tasked with rear-security operations (Bandenbekämpfung, literally "bandit-fighting") in the Soviet Union. On 9 July 1942 Bittrich attended a conference called to convey the principles of the Bandenbekämpfung to senior police and security leaders. Organized by Heinrich Himmler, the conference included Kurt Daluege, Erich von dem Bach-Zelewski, Odilo Globocnik, Bruno Streckenbach and others. The policies included collective punishment against villages suspected of supporting partisans, automatic death penalty for immediate families of suspected partisans, deportation (to labor and death camps) of women and children, and confiscation of property for the state.

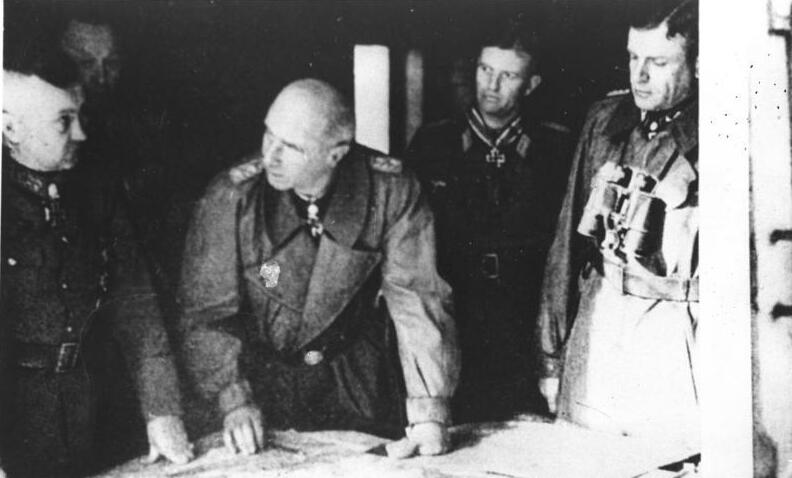
Field Marshal Walter Model (far left), with Bittrich and other German officers at Arnhem, September 1944

He assumed temporary command of the 2nd SS Panzer Division Das Reich from 14 October 1941 to 12 December 1941, after Paul Hausser had been wounded. He then was given command over the 9th SS Panzer Division Hohenstaufen effective February 1943 until 1 July 1944. On 1 July 1944, he was appointed the commander of the 2nd SS Panzer Corps. The 2nd Panzer Corps fought in Normandy. In early September 1944 the 2nd Panzer Corps was relocated to the Arnhem area in the Netherlands, in order to rest its units. On 17 September 1944 the Allies launched Operation Market Garden, British paratroopers of the 1st Airborne Division landed in Arnhem, some distance from its objectives and was quickly hampered by unexpected resistance from Bittrich's corps. 2nd Panzer Corps managed to encircle the 1st Airborne, inflicting heavy casualties. At the request of the British Divisional Medical Officer, Bittrich authorized a three-hour cease-fire on 24 September 1944 to evacuate more than 2,000 wounded British from the encirclement, and place them in the infirmary of his divisions. In the ensuing counterattack to drive the allies from the island Bittrich was critical of Model's tactics predicting the assault would fail. By 8 October all the attacks on the Nijmegen salient had failed with heavy losses. Bittrich later saw action at Hungary. Bittrich was listed as a recipient of the Knight's Cross of the Iron Cross with Oak Leaves and Swords by the Association of Knight's Cross Holders, although no record of the award could be found in the German archives due to the irregular nature of its presentation.

== Conviction for war crimes ==
After his arrest on 8 May 1945 he was extradited to France on charges of having ordered the execution of 17 members of the Resistance in Nîmes. The trial revealed that Bittrich had not given such an order and even opened procedures against the responsible officers. As the overall commander of the troops who committed the execution, he was held responsible for their misconduct and sentenced to five years in prison. The sentence was considered as served after a long pretrial detention. He was put on trial for a second time in 1953 and sentenced to five years in prison for tolerating hangings, pillage and arson, and was released the same year.

== Activities within HIAG ==
Following his release from prison, Bittrich became active in HIAG, a revisionist organization of former Waffen-SS members. In the 1970s, he served as the organization's chairman. Bittrich died in Wolfratshausen, Bavaria on 19 April 1979.

== In popular culture ==
In the 1977 film, A Bridge Too Far, Bittrich is portrayed by actor Maximilian Schell.

== Summary of career ==
=== Awards and decorations ===
- Iron Cross of 1914, Second and First Class
- Honour Cross of the World War 1914/1918 (1934)
- Clasp to the Iron Cross (1939) 2nd Class (25 September 1939) & 1st Class (7 June 1940)
- Knight's Cross of the Iron Cross with Oak Leaves and Swords
  - Knight's Cross on 14 December 1941 as SS-Oberführer and commander of SS-Infanterie-Regiment "Deutschland" of the SS-Division "Reich" (in 1942 "Das Reich")
  - Oak Leaves on 28 August 1944 as SS-Obergruppenführer and General of the Waffen-SS, and commanding general of the II. SS-Panzerkorps
  - Swords on 6 May 1945 as SS-Obergruppenführer and General of the Waffen-SS, and commanding general of the II. SS-Panzerkorps (Note: No evidence of the award can be found in the German Federal Archives. The award was unlawfully presented by SS-Oberstgruppenführer Sepp Dietrich. The date is taken from the announcement made by the 6. SS-Panzerarmee. The sequential number "153" was assigned by the Association of Knight's Cross Recipients (AKCR). Bittrich was member of the AKCR.)
- German Cross in Gold on 6 March 1943 as SS-Brigadeführer and Generalmajor of the Reserves in the 8. SS-Kavallerie-Division "Florian Geyer"

=== Promotions ===
October 1915:	Leutnant der Reserve
1 July 1932:	SS-Anwärter
15 July 1932:	SS-Mann
10 September 1932:	SS-Oberscharführer
31 October 1932:	SS-Sturmführer
21 April 1934:	SS-Obersturmführer
17 June 1934:	SS-Hauptsturmführer
1 October 1936:	SS-Sturmbannführer
30 January 1938:	SS-Obersturmbannführer
6 June 1939:	SS-Standartenführer
1 September 1940:	SS-Oberführer
19 October 1941:	SS-Brigadeführer und Generalmajor der Waffen-SS
1 May 1943:	SS-Gruppenführer und Generalleutnant der Waffen-SS
1 August 1944:	SS-Obergruppenführer und General der Waffen-SS

== Notes ==
Military offices
Preceded by SS-Oberstgruppenführer Paul Hausser	Commander of 2. SS-Panzer Division Das Reich; 15 October 1941 – 31 December 1941	Succeeded by SS-Obergruppenführer Matthias Kleinheisterkamp
Preceded by SS-Gruppenführer Hermann Fegelein	Commander of 8. SS-Kavallerie-Division Florian Geyer; August 1942 – 15 February 1943	Succeeded by SS-Brigadeführer Fritz Freitag
Preceded by none	Commander of 9th SS Panzer Division Hohenstaufen; 15 February 1943 – 29 June 1944	Succeeded by SS-Standartenführer Thomas Müller
Preceded by SS-Oberstgruppenführer Paul Hausser	Commander of II. SS-Panzer Corps; 29 June 1944 – 8 May 1945	Succeeded by dissolved on 8 May 1945
