= II SS Panzer Corps =

- Active: July 1942 – 8 May 1945
- Country: Germany
- Branch: Waffen-SS
- Type: Panzer corps
- Role: Armoured warfare
- Size: Corps
- Engagements: World War II; Case Anton; Third Battle of Kharkov; Battle of Kursk; Kamenets-Podolsky pocket; Battle of Normandy; Operation Market Garden; Battle of the Bulge; Operation Spring Awakening

The II SS Panzer Corps was a German Waffen-SS armoured corps which saw action on both the Eastern and Western Fronts during World War II. It was commanded by Paul Hausser during the Third Battle of Kharkov and the Battle of Kursk in 1943 and by Wilhelm Bittrich on the Western Front in 1944.

== World War II ==
=== 1942–1943 ===
The II SS Panzer Corps was formed to take command of SS Division "Leibstandarte SS Adolf Hitler", SS Division "Das Reich", and SS Division "Totenkopf" in July 1942 as the SS Panzer Corps. In August, it was sent to northern France before taking part in Case Anton, the occupation of Vichy France in November, during which it captured Toulon. In early February 1943, the corps, under the command of SS-Obergruppenführer Paul Hausser, was attached to Army Group South in Ukraine and participated in the Third Battle of Kharkov.

The corps was renamed II SS Panzer Corps in June 1943, after the I SS Panzer Corps was created during that same month. In July 1943, the corps took part in the failed Operation Citadel, spearheading the 4th Panzer Army's attack in the southern sector. The corps' three SS divisions were involved in the Battle of Prokhorovka at the edge of the German penetration into the salient. After the operation was cancelled in light of its failure, the corps was ordered to the Italian front in August. Only one division, the Leibstandarte ended up being transferred along with the corps personnel, taking part in operations to disarm Italian troops. The remaining combat divisions remained on the Eastern Front to deal with the developing threats from the Soviet Belgorod–Kharkov offensive operation.

Between 20 September and 20 of November 1943 the corps conducted operations against Yugoslav Partisans in order to establish a connection with Army Group F in the Balkans and to secure communications east and northwards from Trieste and Rijeka. In these operations, according to the corps headquarters' medical department, the corps suffered total losses of 936 men. According to Croat authors, in the first phase against partisans on the Istrian peninsula (Unternehmen Istrien), some 2000 partisans and 2000 civilians were killed by German forces, and additional 1200 were arrested, with some 400 transported to concentration camps. In November 1943, Leibstandarte returned to the Soviet Union, with the corps remaining in Slovenia, Istria, and Northern Italy.

=== 1944–1945 ===
In January 1944, the corps was ordered to the Alençon area of France to refit.

In March 1944, during the Soviet Dnieper–Carpathian offensive in Ukraine, the entire 1st Panzer Army, numbering over 200,000 personnel, was encircled by the Red Army in the Kamenets–Podolsky pocket. This encirclement was the largest catastrophe facing the Wehrmacht since the Battle of Stalingrad, which would precipitate the collapse of the entire southern sector of the Eastern Front. Faced with a prospect of a new Stalingrad before the Allied invasion of France would even begin, Adolf Hitler was forced to yield to Field Marshal Erich von Manstein's demands for powerful reinforcements that would de-blockade the 1st Panzer Army. As reinforcements, he provided the entire II SS Panzer Corps (with the 9th and 10th SS Panzer Divisions) from France in April 1944, as well as divisions from the Balkan Theatre of Operations. Called the "Hausser Attack Group", they were commanded by Hausser himself.

This was the first major transfer of forces from France to the East since the creation of the Führer Directive 51, which no longer allowed any transfers from the West to the East. It played the main role in de-blockading the encircled 1st Panzer Army in the Kamenets–Podolsky pocket. After rescuing the better part of the 1st Panzer Army, the corps then participated in the attempts to de-blockade the trapped German garrison of the 4th Panzer Army in the town of Tarnopol, which was declared to be a fortress (Festung) by Hitler. However, the Red Army had prepared defences there and the relief operation ultimately failed. After this, the corps was moved into the reserve of the newly created Army Group North Ukraine.

In mid-June 1944, the corps was ordered back west to take part in the Battle of Normandy, arriving to the invasion front in late June 1944.

The corps was involved in heavy fighting against the British 21st Army Group in the Battle for Caen. During this period, SS-Obergruppenführer Wilhelm Bittrich was placed in command of the corps. In August 1944, the corps participated in the battles in and around the Falaise pocket. The corps then retreated across France. On 17 September 1944, the Allies launched Operation Market Garden, an airborne offensive aimed at capturing the Rhine bridge at Arnhem. The corps was involved in fighting against the British 1st Airborne Division in the Battle of Arnhem and also against the U.S. 82nd Airborne Division and the British XXX Corps in Nijmegen. The corps suffered heavy losses in the ensuing counteroffensive in early October against the Allied salient on the island.

In preparation for the Ardennes Offensive, the corps was placed in reserve of the 6th Panzer Army and committed on 21 December 1944 near St. Vith. After the northern assault stalled, the corps was transferred south to take part in the attack on Bastogne. The corps' divisions suffered heavy losses in the battles against the U.S. 82nd and 101st Airborne Divisions. After the operation's failure, the corps returned to the defensive, seeing action against U.S. forces in the Eifel region.

In February 1945, the corps was ordered to Hungary to take part in an offensive to recapture Budapest and the Hungarian oilfields. The corps took part in Operation Spring Awakening, launched near Lake Balaton on 6 March 1945. After the failure of the offensive, the corps retreated, alongside the I SS and IV SS Panzer Corps, towards Vienna. After Soviet forces captured the city, individual units attempted to break out to the west. The elements of the corps surrendered to the U.S. Army on 8 May 1945.

== Commanders ==
- SS-Obergruppenführer Paul Hausser (1 June 1942 – 28 June 1944)
- SS-Gruppen-/Obergruppenführer Wilhelm Bittrich (10 July/1 August 1944 – 9 May 1945)

== Orders of battle ==
February — March 1943 — Third Battle of Kharkov

- 1st SS Panzergrenadier Division "Leibstandarte SS Adolf Hitler"
- 2nd SS Panzergrenadier Division "Das Reich"
- 3rd SS Panzergrenadier Division "Totenkopf"

July 1943 – Operation Citadel

- 1st SS Panzergrenadier Division "Leibstandarte SS Adolf Hitler"
- 2nd SS Panzergrenadier Division "Das Reich"
- 3rd SS Panzergrenadier Division "Totenkopf"
- 167th Infantry Division (elements)

September 1943

- 1st SS Panzergrenadier Division "Leibstandarte SS Adolf Hitler"
- 24th Panzer Division
- 44th Infantry Division
- 71st Infantry Division
- 162nd Turkestan Division

October 1943

- 44th Infantry Division
- 71st Infantry Division
- 162nd Turkestan Division

September — November 1944 — Allied advance towards the Rhine river

- 502nd Heavy SS Panzer Battalion
- 9th SS Panzer Division "Hohenstaufen"
- 10th SS Panzer Division "Frundsberg"

December 1944 - Battle of the Bulge

- 2nd SS Panzer Division "Das Reich"
- 9th SS Panzer Division "Hohenstaufen"

March 1945 – Operation Spring Awakening

- 2nd SS Panzer Division "Das Reich"
- 9th SS Panzer Division "Hohenstaufen"
- 44th Infantry Division
- 23rd Panzer Division

== Sources ==
- German Documents, Publication T354, roll 606: II. SS Panzerkorps, June-December 1943. Washington: National archive. Archived from the original on April 20, 2013.
- Mitcham, Samuel W. (2000). The Panzer Legions. Mechanicsburg: Stackpole Books. ISBN 978-0-8117-3353-3.
