= Hinrich Schuldt =

German SS commander (1901–1944)

- Born: 14 January 1901; Hamburg, German Empire
- Died: 15 March 1944 (aged 43); Newel, Nazi Germany
- Military career
- Allegiance: Weimar Republic; Nazi Germany
- Branch: Reichsmarine; Waffen-SS
- Service years: 1922–1944
- Rank: SS-Brigadeführer
- Service number: NSDAP #975,664
- Commands: SS Brigade Schuldt; 19th Waffen Grenadier Division of the SS (2nd Latvian)
- Conflicts: World War II
- Awards: Knight's Cross of the Iron Cross with Oak Leaves and Swords (posthumously)

Hinrich Schuldt (14 January 1901 – 15 March 1944) was a German SS commander during World War II. He was a posthumous recipient of the Knight's Cross of the Iron Cross with Oak Leaves and Swords of Nazi Germany.

== SS Brigade Schuldt ==
SS Brigade Schuldt, under Schuldt's command, was composed of units drawn from the SS Division Leibstandarte, SS Division Das Reich, SS Polizei Division and a detachment from the Luftwaffe. The brigade was moved to the Eastern Front in December 1942, and by 16 December was sent to the Stalingrad front. On 1 January 1943, it was placed under command of the 6th Panzer Division. The brigade was disbanded on 1 March 1943, with what was left of its units returning to their parent formations. The 1st SS-Polizei Panzegrenadier Regiment 7 was left with 84 men from original 527 and the 7th Battalion LSSAH had 38 men left from original 800.

== Awards ==
- Iron Cross (1939) 2nd Class (24 October 1939) & 1st Class (October 1941)
- German Cross in Gold on 21 April 1943 as SS-Standartenführer in the SS-Brigade "Schuldt"
- Knight's Cross of the Iron Cross with Oak Leaves and Swords
  - Knight's Cross on 5 April 1942 as SS-Obersturmbannführer and commander of SS-Infanterie-Regiment 4 "Reichsführer-SS".
  - Oak Leaves on 2 April 1943 as SS-Standartenführer and commander of SS Brigade Schuldt
  - Swords on 25 March 1944 (posthumously) as SS-Oberführer and commander of the 2. lettische SS-Freiwilligen-Brigade

Military offices
Preceded by none	Commander of 19th Waffen Grenadier Division of the SS (2nd Latvian); January 1944 – 15 March 1944	Succeeded by SS-Standartenführer Friedrich-Wilhelm Bock
