= Erwin Schulz =

German Nazi SS general, Holocaust perpetrator

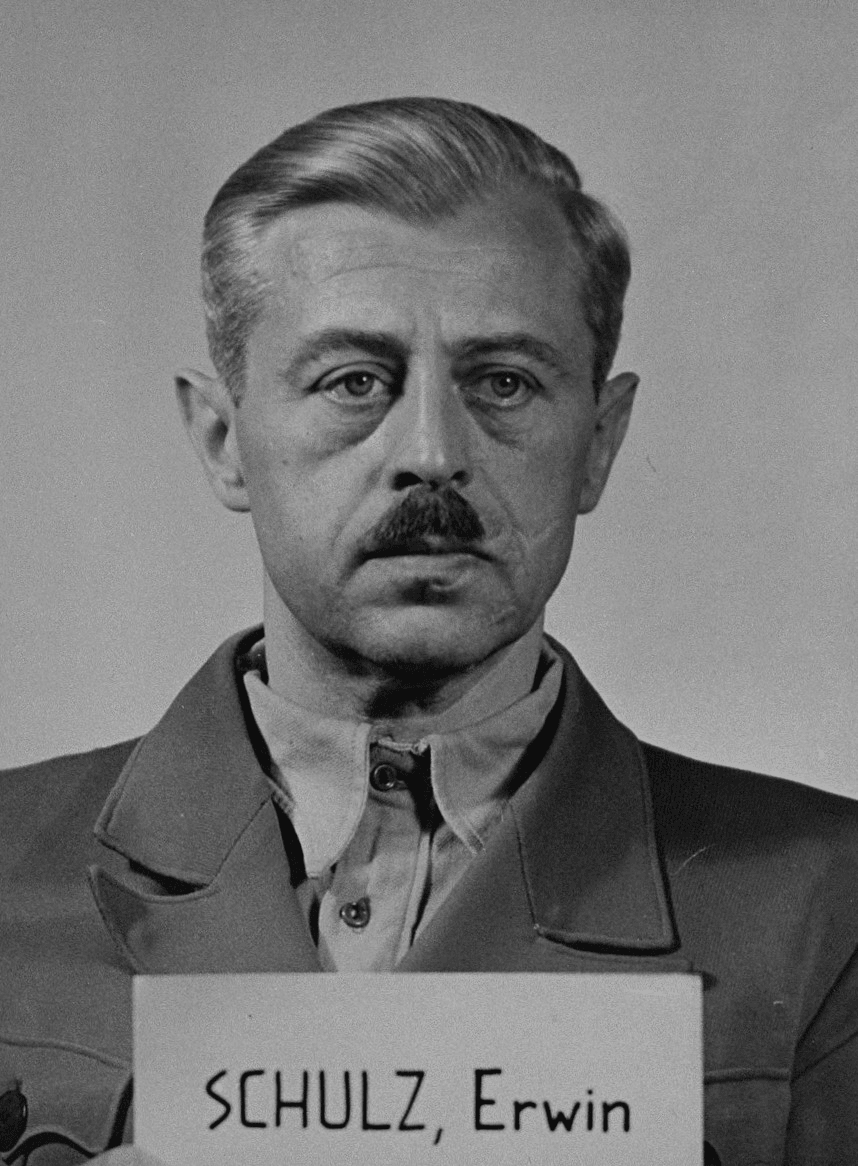
- Schulz's mugshot at the Nuremberg Military Tribunal (July 1947)
- Born: Erwin Wilhelm Schulz; 27 November 1900; Berlin, Kingdom of Prussia, German Empire
- Died: 11 November 1981 (aged 80); Bremen, West Germany
- Status: Deceased
- Motive: Nazism
- Convictions: Crimes against humanity War crimes Membership in a criminal organization
- Penalty: 20 years imprisonment; commuted to 15 years imprisonment

Details
- Victims: Hundreds
- Span of crimes: July – August 1941
- Country: Ukraine and Russia
- Military career
- Allegiance: German Empire; Weimar Republic; Nazi Germany
- Branch: Imperial German Army; Freikorps; Schutzstaffel
- Service years: 1918–1919; 1935–1945
- Rank: SS-Brigadeführer
- Unit: Reich Security Main Office
- Commands: Inspector, SiPo and SD, Wehrkreis X Commander, Einsatzkommando 5 Commander, SiPo and SD, Wehrkreis XVIII
- Conflicts: World War I Spartacist uprising Silesian Uprisings; World War II

Erwin Wilhelm Schulz (27 November 1900 – 11 November 1981) was a German member of the Gestapo and the SS in Nazi Germany. He was the leader of Einsatzkommando 5, part of Einsatzgruppe C, which was attached to the Army Group South during the planned invasion of Soviet Union in 1941, and operated in the occupied territories of south-eastern Poland and Ukrainian SSR committing mass killings of civilian population, mostly men of Jewish ethnicity, under the command of SS-Brigadeführer Otto Rasch.

Schulz is notable for demonstrating that service in the Einsatzgruppen was voluntary. He did not volunteer for the job, nor did he turn it down. Previously, he'd expressed opposition to the mass shootings of Jews. Under orders, Schulz would participate in the mass executions of Jewish men despite "serious misgivings" about his actions. After being ordered to kill Jewish women and children, however, he protested. When he was unable to get the order retracted, he asked if he could stop. The request was granted within days, with Schulz being discharged on the orders of Reinhard Heydrich himself. Schulz not only faced no consequences for stopping, but was promoted shortly after. By the end of the war, he'd reached the rank of SS-Brigadeführer, the SS equivalent of a brigadier general.

== Career ==
In April 1918, Schulz, then 17, volunteered for service in the Imperial German Army. However, World War I ended before he saw combat. The German Empire collapsed in the face of a communist revolution. Around this time, many German youths who were not old enough to have served in the war enlisted in the Freikorps, hoping to prove themselves as patriots and as men by crushing the revolution. Schulz participated in the suppression of the Spartacist uprising as a member of the 3rd Guards Regiment, and was discharged later that year.

After finishing high school, Schulz went to a university in Berlin. He'd wanted to study medicine, but was "frustrated by the economic consequences of the war" and for reasons of "expediency," studied political science and law for two semesters instead. Schulz never received a doctorate in law, albeit some called him Dr. Schulz. He left his studies to join the Freikorps Oberland in the spring of 1921. During his time in the Freikorps, Schulz fought Polish insurgents during the Silesian Uprisings. Afterwards, he worked in a bank and relocated to Hamburg in 1923. He joined the uniformed police force (Schutzpolizei) in Bremen, and in 1926 was appointed a police lieutenant.

Schulz's direct involvement in Nazism started in 1931. In 1930, he was transferred to the intelligence division of the Bremen police, which dealt with political counter intelligence. In 1931, he started working as an informant for the SS. Schulz secretly helped the Nazis gradually take over the offices of the Bremen police. In May 1933, Schulz joined the Nazi Party. In June 1933, the intelligence division was incorporated into the Gestapo, and in November, Schulz was appointed the acting (kommissarisch) chief. He took over as permanent Gestapo chief in Bremen on 1 May 1935. In 1935, he also joined the SS and SD. In March 1938, Schulz was promoted to SS-Sturmbannführer and became a Staatsrat (state councilor) for the state of Bremen. After the occupation and dismemberment of Czechoslovakia, he was made the Gestapo chief in Reichenberg (today, Liberec) in the Sudetenland in May 1939. In April 1940, he was appointed the Inspekteur der Sicherheitspolizei und des SD (IdS) for Wehrkreis (military district) X, headquartered in Hamburg, Germany's second most populous city. This was followed in the Spring of 1941 by his appointment as the chief of department IB (Training and Education) in the Reich Security Main Office's (RSHA) Amt I (Administration). He concurrently was made the leader of the police school for SiPo cadets at Berlin-Charlottenburg.

Numerous colleagues testified that Schulz kept his ties with Nazism separate from his professional job, to the extent that they were unaware of his connections. He was much less stringent with the use of protective custody and disciplined excesses by his subordinates. As late as November 1938, he spoke out against antisemitic excesses and prosecuted Nazis and police officers for illegal persecutions and looting. Even as he served in the proto-Einsatzgruppen while establishing Gestapo posts in the Sudetenland, Austria, and the Protectorate of Bohemia and Moravia, Schulz attempted to maintain moral limits. For example, in early 1941, some of the students at his SiPo school were detailed to Einsatzgruppen units in Russia, returning after a few months. According to one student, Schulz objected to the shootings of Jews, and threatened to expel them for unsuitable character if they were involved.

In May 1941, Schulz was appointed chief of Einsatzkommando 5, a sub-unit of Einsatzgruppe C. The unit departed Germany in June 1941, and arrived in Ukraine in early July 1941. Overall, Einsatzgruppe C executed 2,500 to 3,000 people in Lviv in July 1941. Schulz himself was later proven to have presided over the executions of at least 90 to 100 men by his unit. When Schulz convened with SS-Brigadeführer Otto Rasch, the Einsatzgruppe C commander at Zhytomyr on 10 August 1941, Rasch informed him that on the orders of Adolf Hitler, more Jews needed to be shot. The Higher SS and Police Leader (HSSPF) for occupied Eastern Russia, SS-Obergruppenführer Friedrich Jeckeln, ordered that all Jews not engaged in forced labor, including women and children, were to be killed. Schulz later summarized what had happened at the meeting.

"After about two weeks' stay in Berdichev the commando leaders were ordered to report to Zhitomir, where the staff of Dr. Rasch was quartered. Here Dr. Rasch informed us that Obergruppenführer Jeckeln had been there, and had reported that the Reichsführer-SS had ordered us to take strict measures against the Jews. It had been determined without doubt that the Russian side had ordered to have the SS members and Party members shot. As such measures were being taken on the Russian side, they would also have to be taken on our side. All suspected Jews were, therefore, to be shot. Consideration was to be given only when they were indispensable as workers. Women and children were to be shot also in order not to have any avengers remain. We were horrified, and raised objections, but they were met with a remark that an order which was given had to be obeyed."

Shortly thereafter, Schulz questioned both Bruno Streckenbach and Reinhard Heydrich on this point; it was confirmed that this order had come from Hitler. He asked to be relieved of his post, saying he could not handle this kind of job. On 24 August 1941, he left for Berlin, arriving there three days later.

While testifying at the Frankfurt Auschwitz trials in the 1960s, Schulz said he "tried to prevent the worst". However, he was then asked why he did not object further to the new orders. He admitted that at the time, he'd tried to rationalize the orders to himself, despite personally refusing to carry them out.

"Because the orders were given. And I have to say that here, since they were known to all authorities, I assumed at first that this was, in fact, a carefully considered order issued out of wartime necessity. I did not have the feeling that they were completely unjustified, as inhuman as the orders were."

Schulz' refusal to carry out the orders to kill women and children do not seem to have harmed his career, although he was viewed as being too soft. In November 1941, he was promoted to SS-Oberführer and Oberst of police. In December 1942, he returned to RSHA where he replaced Streckenbach as the chief of Amt I, and where he remained until he was succeeded by Erich Ehrlinger on April 1, 1944. At that time, Schulz was appointed the IdS for Wehrkreis XVIII, based in Salzburg. He reported to Erwin Rösener, HSSPF and commander of SS-Oberabschnitt (main district) "Alpenland". Within weeks, this position was elevated to Befehlshaber der Sicherheitspolizei und des SD (BdS). This was due to the impending threat from Yugoslav partisans. Schulz remained in this position until Germany's surrender in May 1945.

== Postwar ==
Arrested by the Allies, Schulz wrote a letter to Lucius D. Clay, deputy to General Dwight D. Eisenhower, requesting clemency. At the Einsatzgruppen Trial, Schulz claimed that the Lviv executions carried out by his men were legal. He said he had been told that the Russians had massacred about 5000 Ukrainians and Poles before fleeing. Schulz also claimed that German soldiers had been murdered, but could not say how many. Lastly, Schulz said he'd freed 2000 detainees held in a stadium in Lviv after witnessing them being abused by Wehrmacht troops.

"I had subdivided my Kommando into three platoons; each platoon consisted of about 50 men. The persons to be executed were transported by trucks to the place of execution. At each time there was about 18 to 22 persons. The first platoon was placed face to face with the persons about to be executed, and about three men each aimed at each person to be shot. I myself was present at the first volley of the execution, with my face turned away. When the first volley had been fired, I turned around and saw that all persons were lying on the ground. I then left the place of execution and approached the place where the second and third platoons were gathered. The first platoon which had carried out the shootings was recalled, I inspected the men, and then returned to my quarters. I noticed there that the detainees who were in the stadium next to the quarters, some of whom were still to be executed, were driven across the stadium by members of the armed forces and tortured. I did not succeed in apprehending those responsible for the tortures. In order to terminate this spectacle, I had the rear door of the stadium opened and the detainees could march out through it. The members of the armed forces who had participated in this affair disappeared as well. As the remainder of the persons to be executed had also escaped, I informed my Kommando by means of a driver that the executions were terminated. About 6 and 7 days after the executions we started to march towards Dubno."

According to the diary of Felix Landau, he'd witnessed the aftermath of the release of the Jews:

"The Ukrainians had taken some Jews up to the former GPU citadel. These Jews had apparently helped the GPU persecute the Ukrainians and the Germans. They had rounded up 800 Jews there, who were supposed to be shot by us tomorrow. They had released them. We continued along the road. There were hundreds of Jews walking along the street with blood pouring from their faces, holes in their heads, their hands broken and their eyes hanging out of their sockets. They were covered in blood. Some of them were carrying others who had collapsed. We went to the citadel; there we saw things that few people had ever seen. […] The Jews were pouring out of the entrance. There were rows of Jews lying one on top of the other like pigs whimpering horribly. We stopped and tried to see who was in charge of the Kommando. 'Nobody.' Someone had let the Jews go. They were just being hit out of rage and hatred."

While the court accepted Schulz's release of the detainees, it cast doubt on his defense for the executions, saying the documents listed the shootings as reprisals. This meant that thorough investigations or trials had not been conducted prior to the executions, making them illegal. The court also pointed out that while Schulz was on duty in Russia on 9 August 1941, his men had shot 400 Jews, described as mostly "saboteurs and political functionaries". Schulz's men shot another 74 Jews up until this date. From 24 and 30 August, they executed 157 people, the victims being "Jews, officials, and saboteurs." Schulz used his trip to Berlin as an alibi for these executions. However, the court said this did not necessarily exonerate him since they might've been planned in advance. Another document stated that between 31 August and 6 September 1941, Schulz's men reported the "liquidation of 90 political officials, 72 saboteurs and looters, and 161 Jews." Schulz's lawyer claimed the Jews were not listed as criminals since high command had ordered that the Jews not to be listed as "saboteurs, plunderers, etc" in reports. The judges acknowledged that Schulz had been in Berlin at the time of these shootings, but said he was still in command of the unit. In regard to the reason the victims were shot, however, they said other evidence showed the Jews had been shot simply for being Jews.

While testifying about his pre-war career, Schulz downplayed his own antisemitism:

"If 'Anti-Semitic' means hatred and destruction I have never been 'Anti-Semitic'. My so-called 'Anti-Semitic' attitude only went to that extent as the immoral influence of the Jews which I saw in my native country, in policy, economics, and culture, which had great power here and which limited the development of our own forces."

Schulz then attempted to distinguish "good Jews" from other Jews: "If a Jew was an honorable man, his race or religious opinions were of no interest to me." He claimed that following Kristallnacht, as the chief of the Gestapo in Bremen, he had returned all of the stolen property to a certain Jewish jewelry shop owner named "Fischbein". Schulz repeatedly contradicted himself throughout his testimony. At one point, the judges asked him, "Do you regard that part of the program of the National Socialist Party insofar as it concerns the Jews, a program of hatred and contempt?" He replied that he did not. Schulz's lawyer claimed that he had a more modest opinion of Jews, but then added that, "It goes without saying that he wanted to reduce again the tremendous influence of Jewry in his Fatherland to normal proportions." The judges responded that this logic is what led to the Holocaust:

"It was just this spirit of reduction to what the Nazis called 'normal proportions' which brought about the excesses in Germany leading to disfranchisement, appropriation of property, concentration camp confinement, and worse."

Schulz was found guilty on all counts. However, he was spared execution since he had made an effort to oppose the "intolerable situation", then resigned when he could not stop what was happening. Schulz was sentenced to 20 years in prison instead. This sentence was reviewed by the "Peck Panel" and commuted to 15 years in prison in January 1951. Schulz was paroled on 9 January 1954. He died in 1981. In testimony at the trial of Bruno Streckenbach in the 1970s, Schulz said serving in the Einsatzgruppen was entirely voluntary:

"I never knew of any cases where members or heads of the Einsatzkommandos acted in the same way as I did. I believe that things in Russia would never have turned out as they did had a few heads of the Einsatzkommandos and Einsatzgruppen declared that they could not carry out these liquidations. The way I see it, the same applies... to the Wehrmacht commanders in whose areas of command the liquidations were carried out... the avalanche could have still been checked if a field marshal or the commanding officer of any army group had intervened. I do not know of or recall any order that stated that SS chiefs or members of the SD or the police would be sent to concentration camps if they refused to carry out an order. I also never heard of such an order during the course of the conversations I had on the subject or indeed from rumors."

== Lobbying on Schulz's behalf ==
While in prison, numerous German Social Democrats, including press spokesman for the Senate of Bremen Alfred Faust, lobbied on Schulz's behalf. Historian Hans Wrobel has compiled evidence that the Senate of Bremen campaigned on Schulz's behalf due to his knowledge of Gestapo informants in circles of leading Bremen Social Democrats during the Nazi era. In 1933, Faust had been arrested and sent to Mißler concentration camp. During his time in custody, he was badly beaten. However, in 1934, Schulz intervened to have Faust released. Faust was expelled to Berlin with his Jewish wife, and housed under "Gestapo supervision" with the coffee entrepreneur Ludwig Roselius. During his time, Faust repeatedly traveled across Germany in a company car to contact other well-known Social Democrats.
