= Thomas Müller (SS officer) =

German Waffen-SS officer (1902–unknown)

- Born: 2 February 1902; Munich, Kingdom of Bavaria, German Empire
- Died: Unknown
- Military career
- Allegiance: Nazi Germany
- Branch: Waffen-SS
- Rank: SS-Standartenführer
- Commands: NCO-Training school in Radolfzell 9th SS Panzer Division Hohenstaufen; 17th SS Panzergrenadier Division Götz von Berlichingen; 27th SS Volunteer Division Langemarck
- Awards: EKI ISz

Thomas Müller (born February 2, 1902, date of death unknown) was a German Waffen-SS officer who commanded the SS-NCO Training School (Waffen-SS-Unterführerschule) in Radolfzell, 9th SS Panzer Division Hohenstaufen, 17th SS Panzergrenadier Division Götz von Berlichingen and the 6th SS Volunteer Sturmbrigade Langemarck during World War II. He saw action on the East and the West, finishing the war on the Oder front.

== Biography ==
Müller was born in Munich, Bavaria on February 2, 1902. He served with the Freikorps in 1920. Between February 1941 and February 1943 Thomas Müller was commander and tactics instructor of the SS-NCO Training School in Radolfzell. After that, he commanded a regiment of 9th SS Panzer Division Hohenstaufen (February 20, 1943 - June 29, 1944). He assumed command of 9th SS Panzer Division from June 30 to July 10, 1944.

Following this, he briefly took command of a new division, the 17th SS Panzergrenadier Division Götz von Berlichingen. He then received command of the 6th SS Volunteer Sturmbrigade Langemarck on October 19, 1944. The Langemarck acted as support for the German Ardennes offensive but after protest from the political SS they returned to the east. He surrendered the division to the Western Allies at Schwerin.

== Overview of his SS career ==
=== Dates of rank ===
- SS-Untersturmführer: September 11, 1934
- SS-Obersturmführer: June 1, 1935
- SS-Hauptsturmführer: November 11, 1936
- SS-Sturmbannführer: October 31, 1939
- SS-Obersturmbannführer: April 20, 1942
- SS-Standartenführer: June 21, 1943

=== Notable decorations ===
- Iron Cross Second (1940) and First (1940) Classes
- Infantry Assault Badge in Bronze (?)

Military offices
Preceded by SS-Obergruppenführer Wilhelm Bittrich	Commander of 9th SS Panzer Division Hohenstaufen; June 29, 1944 - July 10, 1944	Succeeded by SS-Brigadeführer Sylvester Stadler
Preceded by SS-Oberführer Eduard Deisenhofer	Commander of 17th SS Panzergrenadier Division Götz von Berlichingen; September 1944 - September 1944	Succeeded by SS-Standartenführer Gustav Mertsch
Preceded by SS-Sturmbannführer Eduard Deisenhofer	Commander of 27. SS-Freiwilligen-Grenadier-Division Langemarck; October 1944 - May 2, 1945	Succeeded by surrendered on May 2, 1945
