= Walter Harzer =

SS officer (1912–1982)

- Born: 29 September 1912
- Died: 29 May 1982 (aged 69); Stuttgart, West Germany
- Military career
- Allegiance: Nazi Germany
- Branch: Waffen-SS
- Service years: 1931–1945
- Rank: SS-Oberführer
- Commands: SS Division Hohenstaufen; SS Polizei Division
- Conflicts: World War II
- Awards: Knight's Cross of the Iron Cross

Walter Harzer (29 September 1912 – 29 May 1982) was a German SS commander during the Nazi era. He commanded the SS Division Hohenstaufen and SS Polizei Division.

After the war, Harzer became active in HIAG, a lobby group established by senior Waffen-SS men in 1951 in West Germany. He acted as the organisation's official historian, coordinating the writing and publications of revisionist unit histories, which appears in German via the Munin Verlag imprint.

== World War II ==
Born in 1912, Harzer joined the SS in 1931. In March 1934 Harzer joined SS-Verfügungstruppe (SS-VT) and was assigned to the Sicherheitsdienst (SD) and later the SS Division Das Reich. He participated in the invasion of Poland. From mid-1942 until April 1943 Walter served as a staff officer first with the LVII Panzer Corps and later, after completing the general staff course, with the SS Division Frundsberg.

In April 1943, Harzer was assigned to the SS Division Hohenstaufen. As Hohenstaufen was ordered for a refit in the Netherlands, Harzer became its fifth commander, taking over for Friedrich-Wilhelm Bock. On Sunday 17 September 1944, the Allies launched Operation Market Garden and Harzer’s division was engaged in the Battle of Arnhem. Harzer was awarded the Knight's Cross of the Iron Cross for his actions during these battles.

In October 1944 Harzer became the Chief of Staff of V SS Mountain Corps before receiving the command of the 4th SS Polizei Division at the end of November 1944. Together with the rest of this division Harzer surrendered to the American Army on 8 May 1945.

== Post-war activities ==
After the war Harzer worked as an official historian for HIAG, an organization of former Waffen-SS members. He helped coordinate the writing of numerous tendentious unit histories and memoirs by former Waffen-SS officers. Harzer died in 1982.

== Awards ==
- Knight's Cross of the Iron Cross on 21 September 1944 as SS-Obersturmbannführer and Ia (operations officer) of the 9th SS Panzer Division Hohenstaufen

Military offices
Preceded by SS-Oberführer Friedrich-Wilhelm Bock	Commander of 9th SS Panzer Division Hohenstaufen; 29 August 1944 – 10 October 1944	Succeeded by SS-Brigadeführer Sylvester Stadler
Preceded by SS-Brigadeführer Fritz Schmedes	Commander of 4th SS Polizei Division; 27 November 1944 – March 1945	Succeeded by SS-Standartenführer Fritz Göhler
Preceded by SS-Standartenführer Fritz Göhler	Commander of 4th SS Polizei Division; March 1945 – 8 May 1945	Succeeded by none
