= Sylvester Stadler =

Waffen-SS Commander (1910–1995)

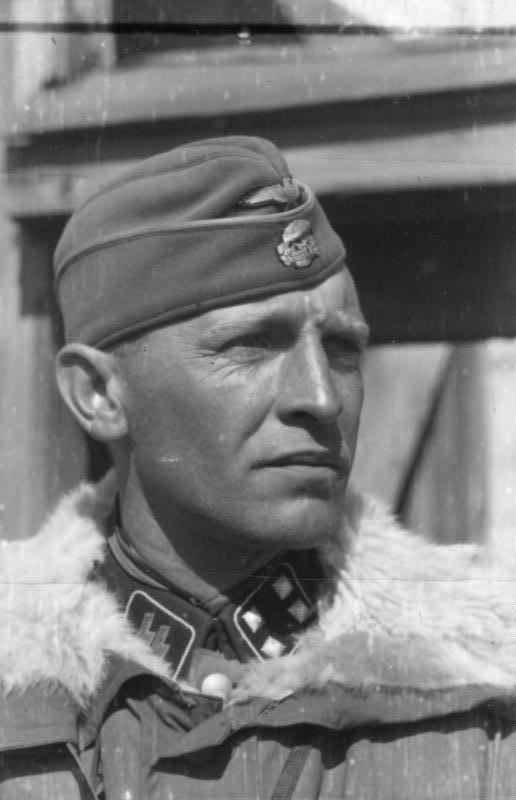
- Born: 30 December 1910; Fohnsdorf, Austria-Hungary
- Died: 23 August 1995 (aged 84); Augsburg, Germany
- Military career
- Allegiance: Nazi Germany
- Branch: Waffen-SS
- Service years: 1935–1945
- Rank: SS-Brigadeführer
- Nickname: Vestel
- Service number: NSDAP #4,159,018; SS #139,495
- Commands: 4th SS Panzergrenadier Der Führer Regiment; 9th SS Panzer Division Hohenstaufen
- Known for: Oradour-sur-Glane massacre
- Conflicts: World War II
- Awards: Knight's Cross of the Iron Cross with Oak Leaves

Sylvester Stadler (30 December 1910 – 23 August 1995) was a high-ranking Austrian commander of the Waffen-SS, a commander of the 9th SS Panzer Division Hohenstaufen, previously having been the commander of the SS regiment whose 3rd Company was responsible for the Oradour-sur-Glane massacre. Only 34 years old at the end of the war, he held the rank of SS-Brigadeführer and Generalmajor of the Waffen-SS and was a recipient of the Knight's Cross with Oak Leaves.

== Biography ==
Stadler was born in Austria, the son of a Styrian miner, who learned the profession of electrical engineer after elementary and state school in Judenburg but joined the Nazi party and the SS in May 1933.

At the beginning of the Second World War, he led a company of the SS-Verfügungstruppe (SS-VT). He then fought with the SS-Verfügungsdivision in France in 1940, where he was wounded near Arras. He also took part in the Balkan campaign in 1941. After being wounded again in the Battle of Moscow in 1941, he was briefly employed as a tactics teacher at the SS-Junker School in Braunschweig.

From March 1, 1942, he commanded the 2nd Battalion of the Panzer Grenadier Regiment Der Führer belonging to the SS Division Das Reich. In May 1943 he was appointed commander of the 4th SS Panzergrenadier Der Führer Regiment with which he fought in Russia. For repelling an intrusion by the Red Army near Kharkov, he was awarded the Knight's Cross of the Iron Cross on April 6, 1943.

To recuperate, the Der Führer regiment, which had been severely decimated in Russia, was relocated to France in the Toulouse area at the beginning of 1944 - just like the remaining 2nd SS Panzer Division “Das Reich”. The division was ordered north to combat the Allied landing forces in Normandy in June 1944.

While Stadler was commander of the Der Führer, a subordinate unit under his command committed the Oradour-sur-Glane massacre. On 10 June 1944, part of the regiment, led by SS-Sturmbannführer Adolf Diekmann, killed 642 inhabitants of Oradour-sur-Glane. Stadler ordered a court martial for Diekmann, albeit the latter was killed in action before he could face the ordered trial.

On 10 July 1944, Stadler was appointed commander of the 9th SS Panzer Division Hohenstaufen. It fought on the Eastern Front, in Normandy, at the Falaise pocket, at Arnhem ("Operation Market Garden"), in the Ardennes offensive and in Hungary. He surrendered his division to the U.S. Army in Austria in May 1945. Stadler was interned until 1948.

== Awards ==
- Iron Cross (1939) 2nd Class (25 September 1939) & 1st Class (26 June 1940)
- Knight's Cross of the Iron Cross with Oak Leaves and Swords
  - Knight' Cross on 6 April 1943 as SS-Sturmbannführer and commander of the II./SS-Panzergrenadier-Regiment "Der Führer"
  - 303rd Oak Leaves on 16 September 1943 as SS-Obersturmbannführer and commander of the SS-Panzergrenadier-Regiment "Der Führer"
  - Swords in 1945 as commander of the SS Division Hohenstaufen (?) No evidence of the award can be found in the German Federal Archives. Stadler claimed that Sepp Dietrich proposed him on 22 March 1945, even though the SS Division Hohenstaufen was not subordinated to the 6th Panzer Army.

Military offices
Preceded by SS-Standartenführer Thomas Müller	Commander of 9th SS Panzer Division Hohenstaufen; 10 July 1944 – 31 July 1944	Succeeded by SS-Oberführer Friedrich-Wilhelm Bock
Preceded by SS-Oberführer Walter Harzer	Commander of 9th SS Panzer Division Hohenstaufen; 10 October 1944 – 8 May 1945	Succeeded by none
