= Joachim Rumohr =

German World War II SS commander (1910–1945)

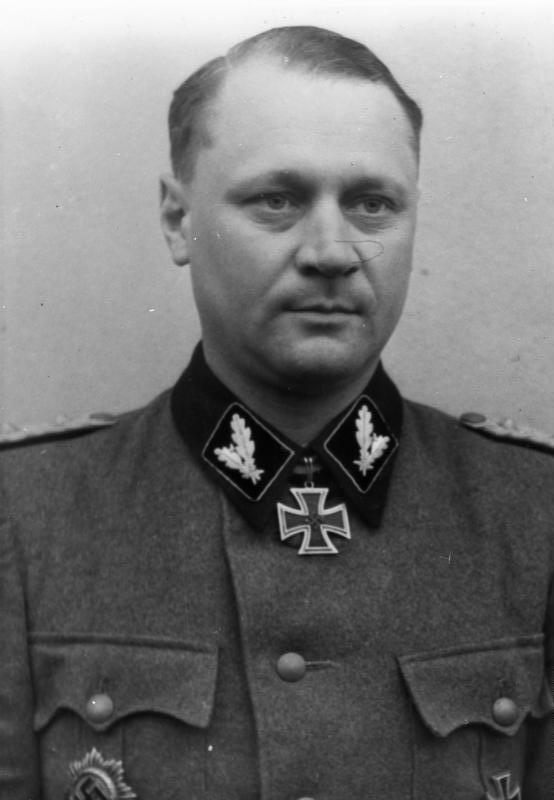
- Born: 6 August 1910; Hamburg, German Empire
- Died: 11 February 1945 (aged 34); Budapest, Hungary
- Military career
- Allegiance: Nazi Germany
- Branch: Waffen-SS
- Service years: 1935–1945
- Rank: SS- Brigadeführer
- Unit: SS Cavalry Division Florian Geyer
- Conflicts: World War II
- Awards: Knight's Cross of the Iron Cross with Oak Leaves

Joachim Rumohr (6 August 1910 – 11 February 1945) was a German SS commander during the Nazi era. He commanded the SS Cavalry Division Florian Geyer.

On 1 April 1944, Rumohr was appointed commander of the 8th SS Cavalry Division Florian Geyer. In November 1944, he was promoted to Brigadeführer and led the division during the fighting in Budapest. Rumohr was a recipient of the Knight's Cross of the Iron Cross with Oak Leaves. He was seriously wounded during the attempt to break out from the city. Faced with surrender to the Soviet Red Army, Rumohr committed suicide on 11 February 1945.

== Awards ==
- Iron Cross 2nd Class (14 November 1939) & 1st Class (28 August 1940)
- German Cross in Gold on 23 February 1943 as SS-Obersturmbannführer in Artillerie-Regiment SS-Kavillerie-Division
- Knight's Cross of the Iron Cross with Oak Leaves
  - Knight's Cross on 16 January 1944 as SS-Obersturmbannführer and commander of SS-Artillerie-Regiment 8 "Florian Geyer"
  - Oak Leaves on 1 February 1945 as SS-Brigadeführer and commander of 8. SS-Kavillerie-Division "Florian Geyer"
