= 1st SS Special Regiment Waräger =

- Active: 1945
- Allegiance: Germany; KONR
- Type: Infantry
- Size: Regiment
- Nicknames: Vlasovtsy (Власовцы); Cossacks
- Engagements: World War II

Commanders
- Notable commanders: Mikhail Alexandrovich Semenov

Insignia
- Badge

- Flag of the KONR

1st SS Special Regiment Waräger (German: SS-Sonder-Regiment I 'Waräger') was a collaborationist formation, primarily composed of Russians, that fought under German command during World War II.

== Background ==
After the end of the Russian Civil War (1917–23), several hundred thousand Russians (and other subjects of the Imperial Russia) fled the Bolshevik forces. Most so-called White émigrés initially fled from Southern Russia and Ukraine to Turkey and then moved to other Slavic countries in Europe (the Kingdom of Yugoslavia, Bulgaria, Czechoslovakia, and Poland). A large number also fled to Estonia, Latvia, Lithuania, Finland, Iran, Germany and France. Some émigrés also fled to Portugal, Spain, Romania, Belgium, France, Sweden, Switzerland, and Italy.

In the Kingdom of Yugoslavia, a Russian All-Military Union (Russian: Русский Обще-Воинский Союз, abbreviated РОВС, ROVS) was formed by White Army General Pyotr Wrangel on 1 September 1924, initially headquartered in the town of Sremski Karlovci.

After the invasion of Yugoslavia in April 1941 and subsequent establishment of the Independent State of Croatia (NDH), German military government in Serbia and direct occupation of other Yugoslav lands, the German forces started to recruit local population for its paramilitary formations, primarily for combating emerging Communist-led Anti-fascist Yugoslav Partisans.

== Mikhail Semyonov ==
One such Russian White émigré, Mikhail Semyonov (White émigré), who was a military officer of the Russian Imperial Army and then of White Army. After relocation to Yugoslavia, he settled in Croatian city of Osijek, where he worked in culture and industry; at that time he was member of different emigre groups: Russian Tsarist Union-Order, Union of Russian National Youth and National Union of Russian Youth /National Union of New Generation.

After the formation of NDH, Semenov started to cooperate with the Reich Main Security Office (RSHA), tasked with establishing Russian nationalist-socialist party in Croatia. But soon afterwards, he was sent to Serbia to join Russian Corps (German: Russisches Schutzkorps Serbien, Russian: Русский корпус); some sources also state, that he was an officer in the 7th SS Volunteer Mountain Division Prinz Eugen.

In April 1942, Semenov was tasked by the Sicherheitsdienst (SD) to form a battalion, based on the Russian White émigrés, living in Yugoslavia and neighboring countries, with added contingent of local Serbian volunteers. At first, the battalion was meant to participate in the SD's Operation Zeppelin, but was then included into the German auxiliary police force in Serbia. Battalion was stationed in Belgrade, Smederevo and Požarevac, where they were responsible for securing roads and rainways against the partisan attacks. In summer 1943, he and selected group of Russian White émigrés were assigned to the Operation Zeppelin for conducting sabotage and long-range reconnaissance missions behind the frontlines, inside the Soviet Union. But in general, the operation was unsuccessful and in summer 1944, the Semenov and his men were sent to Slovenian town of Kamnik.

== Regiment ==
The unit was known as Sonderkommando K or SS Jäger Bataillon and was once again involved in counter-insurgency operations against Slovenian partisans in the area of Upper Carniola. In November 1944, the unit was relocated to Ljubljana, where the unit was enlarged with the transfer of Soviet prisoners of war and in February 1945, the unit was renamed into the SS-Sonder-Regiment I 'Waräger'. At first, the newly formed regiment had only five companies (in two battalions) with around 500 men altogether. In February 1945, a part of the regiment was sent to Suha krajina region, to secure positions along the Krka river around the town of Žužemberk.

The regiment held their positions against several partisan attacks until late April 1945, when a general German retreat started from the Slovenian territory. During this time, the regiment was formally transferred fully under the Russian Liberation Army's group under Anton Vasilyevich Turkul, but was in reality still under full German control. While retreating, some regimental personnel were captured by Yugoslav partisans, though the majority managed to reach Western Allied forces in Italy and Austria. Some of the British-captured regimental men were then repatriated to the Soviet Union, while others (non-Soviet citizens) were allowed to remain in Europe or emigrate to South America.
