= 19th Waffen Grenadier Division of the SS (2nd Latvian) =

German infantry division

- 19. Waffen-Grenadier-Division der SS (lettische Nr. 2); 19. SS grenadieru divīzija (latviešu Nr. 2)
- Unit insignia
- Active: 1944–45
- Country: Nazi Germany
- Branch: Waffen-SS
- Type: Infantry
- Size: Division
- Part of: VI SS Army Corps (Latvian)
- Engagements: World War II

Commanders
- Notable commanders: Hinrich Schuldt

The 19th Waffen Grenadier Division of the SS (2nd Latvian) (German: 19. Waffen-Grenadier-Division der SS (lettische Nr. 2), Latvian: 19. SS grenadieru divīzija (latviešu Nr. 2)) was an infantry division of the Waffen-SS during World War II. It was the second Latvian division formed in January 1944, after its sister unit, the 15th Waffen Grenadier Division of the SS (1st Latvian) with which it formed the Latvian Legion. It was surrounded in the Courland Pocket at the end of the war where it surrendered to the Red Army.

The division was formed in January 1944, from 2 SS Infantry Brigades with the addition of a newly raised third regiment, Waffen Grenadier Regiment 46 (Latvian No. 6). Simultaneously, the designations of the two other grenadier regiments were changed from 39 and 40 to 42 and 43 respectively. The commander of the SS brigade, SS-Oberführer Hinrich Schuldt became the first commander of the division. After Schuldt was killed in action on 15 March 1944, SS-Standartenführer Friedrich-Wilhelm Bock temporarily took command, being replaced on April 13 by SS-Oberführer Bruno Streckenbach, who led the division until the end of war.

== See also ==
- List of Waffen-SS units
- Ranks and insignia of the Waffen-SS
- Waffen-SS foreign volunteers and conscripts

== Bibliography ==
- Tessin, Georg (1970). Verbände und Truppen der deutschen Wehrmacht und Waffen–SS im Zweiten Weltkrieg 1939–1945 [Units and Troops of the German Military and Waffen-SS in the Second World War 1939–1945] (in German). Vol. 4: Die Landstreitkräfte 15–30 (Units 15–30). Osnabrück: Biblio.
