= Jürgen Wagner =

Brigadeführer in the Waffen SS during World War II (1901–1947)

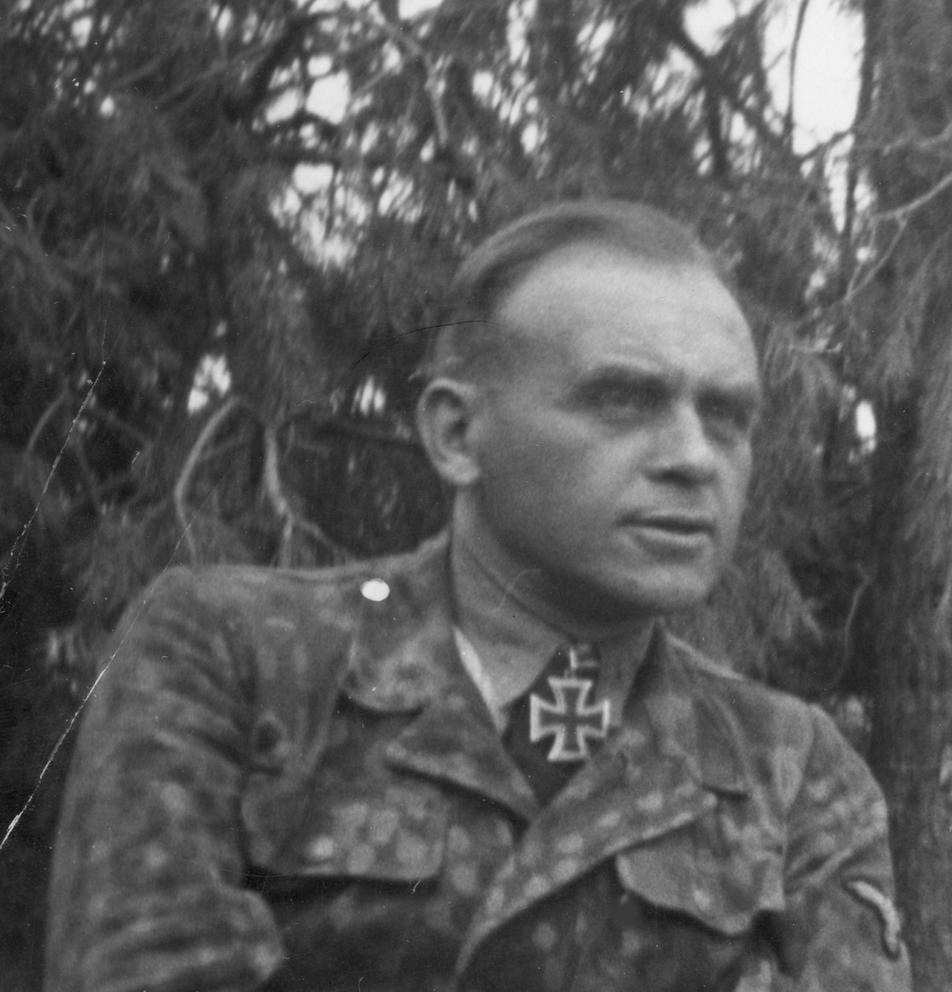
- Wagner in 1944
- Born: 9 September 1901; Strasbourg, German Empire
- Died: 27 June 1947 (aged 45); Belgrade, SR Serbia, SFR Yugoslavia
- Cause of death: Execution by firing squad
- Military career
- Allegiance: German Empire; Weimar Republic; Nazi Germany
- Branch: Waffen-SS
- Rank: Brigadeführer
- Service number: Nazi Party #707,279; SS #23,692
- Units: SS Division Nederland; 4th SS Polizei Division
- Conflicts: World War II
- Awards: Knight's Cross of the Iron Cross with Oak Leaves

Jürgen Wagner (9 September 1901 – 27 June 1947) was a German SS commander during the Nazi era. In World War II, he commanded the SS Division Nederland and the 4th SS Polizei Division. Wagner was subsequently convicted of war crimes in Yugoslavia and executed.

== Career ==
In April 1944 Wagner was promoted to SS-Brigadeführer and given command of the 4th SS Polizei Division. In August 1944, Wagner was given command of a Kampfgruppe (battle group), against the Tartu Offensive of the Soviet 3rd Baltic Front.

After the war ended, Wagner was taken prisoner by the Americans. He was extradited to Yugoslavia in 1947. There, he was put on trial before the military tribunal of the 3rd Yugoslav Army from 29 May to 6 June 1947 in Zrenjanin. It is not precisely known for what he was indicted. However, his orders for the mass executions of civilians in 1941 and later on reportedly played a role in his conviction. Found guilty of the charges, he was sentenced to death by firing squad and executed on 27 June 1947.

== Awards ==
- Iron Cross (1939) 2nd Class (16 May 1940) & 1st Class (1 July 1940)
- German Cross in Gold on 8 December 1942 as SS-Standartenführer in SS-Infanterie-Regiment "Germania"
- Knight's Cross of the Iron Cross with Oak Leaves
  - Knight's Cross on 24 July 1943 as SS-Oberführer and commander of SS-Panzergrenadier-Regiment "Germania".
  - 680th Oak Leaves on 11 December 1944 as SS-Brigadeführer and Generalmajor of the Waffen-SS and commander of the 4. SS-Freiwilligen-Panzergrenadier-Brigade "Nederland"

== See also ==
- List of SS-Brigadeführer
