= Bruno Streckenbach =

German SS general (1902–1977)

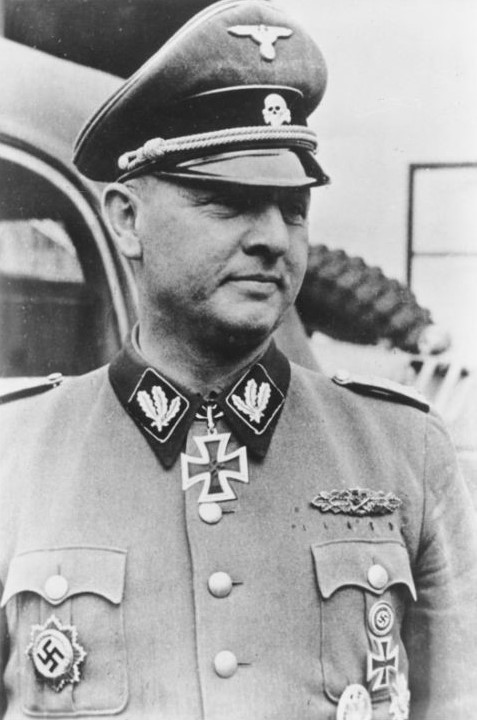
- Born: 7 February 1902; Hamburg, German Empire
- Died: 28 October 1977 (aged 75); Hamburg, West Germany
- Military career
- Allegiance: German Empire; Weimar Republic; Nazi Germany
- Branch: Waffen-SS
- Service years: 1918–1945
- Rank: SS-Gruppenführer
- Service number: NSDAP #489,972; SS #14,713
- Commands: SS Cavalry Division Florian Geyer; 2nd Latvian Waffen-SS Division
- Conflicts: World War I Kapp Putsch; World War II
- Awards: Knight's Cross of the Iron Cross with Oak Leaves

Bruno Streckenbach (7 February 1902 – 28 October 1977) was a German SS functionary during the Nazi era. He was the head of the Administration and Personnel Department of the Reich Security Main Office (RSHA). Streckenbach was responsible for many thousands of murders committed by Nazi mobile killing squads known as Einsatzgruppen.

== Early years ==
Bruno Streckenbach was born in Hamburg, Germany, on 7 February 1902. His highest education was Gymnasium, which he left in April 1918 to voluntarily report to the German Army during World War I. Just like his close colleagues Erwin Schulz and Heinrich Himmler, he never served on the front lines of the battlefield due to the ceasefire that took place in November 1918.

After the end of the First World War, he was an active member of the Freikorps Bahrenfeld, which took part in the 1920 Kapp-Putsch. He was employed as a wholesale merchant, tried his hand at advertising, being a radio editor and also trying to establish himself as the director of a local office.

== Nazi seizure of power in 1933 ==
1933 was a huge year for many soon-to-be SS and police officers. As some historians have mentioned, for people like Streckenbach, 1933 was the year in which they assumed positions in the Gestapo (Political Police), but also the year in which they were put into “leadership positions, posts they would hardly have occupied without the National Socialist seizure of power.”

Following the Reichstag Fire on 27 February 1933, which the Nazis falsely claimed to be “communist-led,” President Paul Hindenburg signed the Reichstag Fire Decree suspending constitutional rights in the Weimar Republic. In the March 5 Reichstag Elections, the National Socialists won power, although only upon merging with the German National People's Party. After winning the majority vote, the Nazis seized full power. Persecution against political opponents and Jews increased, as did the incidence of brutal assaults, sporadic murders, and arson. It was during this seizure of power that many of the future leaders of the RSHA were given their first positions in the party.

More than a quarter of the future RSHA leaders had already been police officers in their hometowns before 1933. In 1933, almost two-thirds of these men were given political police positions in their towns or cities, or sent to Berlin as a part of the Gestapo Office.

Streckenbach's placement as chief of the Gestapo in Hamburg illustrates the “superficiality of professional continuity” – referring to the lack of qualifications many candidates possessed – as some historians characterise the Nazi Party's seizure of power. For years, these young radical right-wing militants had been marginalised, but with the rise of the Nazis, they were now given the chance to pursue a career which not only allowed but encouraged them to act on their radical and violent worldviews, while providing them with professional advances they had failed to achieve before then.

== In the invasion of Poland ==
Reinhard Heydrich and Himmler were always trying to expand their power and authority beyond the confines of the German Reich. In accordance with Hitler's notion of Lebensraum and long-term goals of “conquering extensive territories in the Soviet Union”, Hitler and other top Nazi leadership started preparing for a war, marked by the invasion of Poland. In preparation for the invasion of Poland, Heydrich began planning the creation of killing squads, a “fighting administration”, as he put it.

The Einsatzgruppen were in charge of securing German power and occupational authority in Poland through terror, furthering the ideology of ethnic cleansing and Lebensraum via deportations from the occupied territory and mass executions within. The number of Einsatzgruppen corresponded to the Wehrmacht army units deployed. The leaders of the Sicherheitspolizei (SiPo; Security Police) in Berlin selected the office heads of the Einsatzgruppen very carefully, most of them being prior SD members or leaders. The members of the Einsatzgruppen——500 men per Einsatzgruppe——were taken from local SS and police stations near the five units’ locations.

After the war, Streckenbach testified that Werner Best had directed deployment orders directly to him at the end of July or beginning of August. Streckenbach immediately left Hamburg to drive to Vienna, where he was deployed as head of Einsatzgruppe I.

When the German Wehrmacht invaded Poland on the morning of 1 September 1939, the Einsatzgruppen followed, sending reports to Berlin detailing the actions of Operation Tannenberg, the code name given to the anti-Polish extermination action carried out by the SD and SiPo in Poland during the opening weeks of the war. It was Streckenbach's task to oversee four districts as Befehlshaber der Sicherheitspolizei im General Gouvernement: Warsaw, Krakow, Radom and Lublin. In each of these districts, thousands of Polish intellectuals——many former officers, professors, teachers, or politicians——were arrested and soon after, murdered.

During a span of eight weeks in late 1939, Nazi forces, including the Einsatzgruppen, executed over 60,000 people. Hitler insisted that this “harsh ethnic battle” could only be won without any internal resistance or legal restrictions upon implementation. Furthermore, the RSHA was the appropriate department for this “ethnic battle."

Streckenbach detailed the mission of the Einsatzgruppen: they were to seize and destroy all political and racial enemy groups, such as leftists, Roma, members of the Polish resistance and Jews. In addition, they were to report on and evaluate material seized during the campaign and to gather information from agents among the Soviet population. Streckenbach ordered all enemies of the Third Reich to be deported to concentration camps and there to be executed. Jews were especially singled out for Sonderbehandlung ("special treatment"), a process that entailed particularly brutal beatings. On 9 November 1941, he was promoted to SS-Gruppenführer und Generalleutnant der Polizei.

Historian Michael Wildt suggests a stark increase in the activation of Streckenbach's radicalism from his time as a Gestapo chief in Hamburg to his first few months as the head of Einsatzgruppe I in Poland. Wildt notes the difference in responsibilities, going from arrests, abuses, assaults and killings of prisoners to the mindset of extermination of large groups of people. More than just a racial justification, Wildt suggests that Streckenbach's first few months as head of Einsatzgruppe I escalated into a murderous ideology that was inconceivable before this position.

Most of the previous SD men who were now employed in the Einsatzgruppen had not inflicted such murderous activity on so many people up until this point. As Wildt suggests, the deployment in Poland for the Einsatzgruppen was a defining moment for how policing matters were to be handled. It was these men's “first experience as racist mass murderers”. The deportations to the General-Gouvernement came from the Reich as well as newly “Germanized” territories which Germany had taken from Poland, removing the local “opponents”——Jews, Poles, Roma, and “asocial persons”——and replacing them with ethnic Germans.

By the end of 1939, the Einsatzgruppen were permanent units of the RSHA. Many members of the RSHA worked alongside the Einsatzgruppen in implementing brutal violence and mass murder throughout Poland. In May 1940, thousands of Poles were reported as liquidated. At the end of this month, Streckenbach had reported that “sentencing by martial law” was completed, with over 8,500 persons——whether accused as being “career criminals” or summoned to “summary sentencing”——were either already executed or would be shortly. During his time in Poland, he had earned a reputation as the ruthless chief who fought with much determination and mercilessness to eradicate any Nazi opponents.

== German offensive against the Soviet Union ==
At the beginning of 1941, the attack on the Soviet Union was first discussed among the leaders of the RSHA. In March 1941, Heydrich informed a small circle of leaders, including Streckenbach, about the offensive that was to take place. The Wehrmacht army would lead, and the Einsatzgruppen would secure the area after the Soviets had been defeated. Streckenbach volunteered his units, but Heydrich decided differently.

Streckenbach had commissioned the Personnel and Administration Office Leaders, advising them to prepare for deployment. In May 1941, Streckenbach called on his long-time colleague Erwin Schulz to prepare his men in the Leadership School of the Security Police in Berlin-Charlottenberg for deployment after just having completed their training as Criminal Police inspectors. Streckenbach sent them to Pretzsch, where they were to assume leadership status of the Einsatzkommando. These young soldiers, many of them recent college graduates, came motivated to fight and impress authority. The Einsatzgruppen were divided and reconstituted in Pretzsch in May 1941.

Streckenbach, Müller and Heydrich had the most authority in dispersing directions of the Einsatzkommandos in Pretzsch, leading up to the offensive on the Soviet Union. Furthermore, in Otto Ohlendorf's Nuremberg Trial, he testified that Streckenbach had communicated the “order for the Final Solution” to the Einsatzgruppen.

== Heydrich's death ==
After Heydrich was killed on 4 June 1942 by Czech and Slovak soldiers, Himmler took over leadership of the RSHA. Himmler focused his efforts on ensuring that Western European Jews were sent to extermination camps as efficiently and completely as possible, allowing the RSHA office heads, such as Streckenbach, to have nearly complete autonomy to oversee how it was done and to manage the internal structure of their respective divisions.

At the end of July 1942, Himmler named Streckenbach his representative as the legal authority of the RSHA. This essentially gave the latter absolute authority in deciding disciplinary cases regarding members of the RSHA. After Streckenbach had served as RSHA chief for about six months, Himmler concluded that a successor had to be publicly named. Streckenbach's responsibilities and qualifications were highly regarded and far exceeded expectations, and for this reason, he was largely considered the best candidate for the position. Historian Tuviah Friedmann speculated that Himmler saw Streckenbach in some regards as having far too much power in his hands, possibly even seeing him as professional competition. To this day, however, it is still unknown why Streckenbach was not appointed for the position of head of the RSHA, and Ernst Kaltenbrunner was chosen instead.

== After the RSHA ==
Hitler and Himmler wanted to name Streckenbach as the Senior SS and Police Leader of the Alpenland in Salzburg, Austria. Extremely disappointed, Streckenbach declined and, in a personal letter to Himmler, asked to be placed in a military position.

Streckenbach trained in Hilversum, Holland, with an antitank unit as an Untersturmführer at the beginning of 1943, and quickly advanced through the ranks of the Waffen-SS, even for being a senior SS leader. He was a regiment and division leader of the 8th SS Cavalry Division Florian Geyer and went on to lead the 19th Waffen Grenadier Division of the SS (2nd Latvian) in the offensive against the Soviet Union in 1944 as a general. On 10 May 1945, Streckenbach and his division were taken prisoner in the Courland Pocket by the Soviet army. A Soviet military court sentenced him to 25 years in prison for war crimes. Streckenbach served his sentence at Vladimir Central Prison, and remained a Soviet prisoner of war until 9 October 1955, when he was sent back to Hamburg.

== Legal prosecution ==
When Streckenbach returned to Hamburg, he was informed that he faced charges for actions he had taken as the city's Gestapo chief. He was accused of beating someone in the kidneys; however, after further investigation, the state prosecutor could not obtain the appropriate documents, which provided evidence of the charges.

During the Nuremberg Trials, Streckenbach's name was continuously mentioned in court papers, among which was testimony from Otto Ohlendorf, who identified Streckenbach as one who had directed the Einsatzgruppen towards implementation of the Final Solution. However, the Hamburg State Prosecutor's Office concluded that there was not sufficient evidence to prove that his actions conflicted with the extant governing laws of the National Socialist rule.

In 1957, state prosecutors in Germany began investigating the unfathomable atrocities and millions of deaths of Soviet Jews committed by the Einsatzkommando, culminating in the Ulm Einsatzkommando trial. This case prompted the 1959 establishment of the Central Office of State Justice Administration for the Investigation of National Socialist Crimes (Zentrale Stelle der Landesjustizverwaltungen zur Aufklärung der nationalsozialistischen Gewaltverbrechen) in Ludwigsburg. In the early 1960s, the office discovered a document providing evidence of deployment orders to Criminal Police and Gestapo officers that instigated murderous activity. The court ordered the resumption of the investigation of crimes committed by Streckenbach.

On 30 June 1973, a bill of indictment for the murder of at least a million people was brought. Streckenbach never had to answer these charges.

Streckenbach, who was suffering from serious heart disease at the time, sought to avoid trial based on the strains a trial might place on his health. On 20 September 1974, the Hanseatic Appellate Court confirmed a diagnosis postponing trial commencement indefinitely. He died on 28 October 1977 in Hamburg, Germany.

=== Awards ===
- Iron Cross (1939) 2nd Class (10 October 1940) & 1st Class (15 July 1943)
- German Cross in Gold on 15 December 1943 as SS-Standartenführer in the SS-Kavallerie-Division
- Knight's Cross of the Iron Cross with Oak Leaves
  - Knight's Cross on 27 August 1944 as commander of the 19. Waffen-Grenadier Division der Waffen-SS (lett. Nr. 2).
  - Oak Leaves on 16 January 1945 as commander of the 19. Waffen-Grenadier Division der Waffen-SS (lett. Nr. 2).

== See also ==
- List SS-Gruppenführer

Military offices
Preceded by SS-Gruppenführer Hermann Fegelein	Commander of 8th SS Cavalry Division Florian Geyer; 13 September 1943 – 22 October 1943	Succeeded by SS-Gruppenführer Hermann Fegelein
Preceded by SS-Gruppenführer Hermann Fegelein	Commander of 8th SS Cavalry Division Florian Geyer; 1 January 1944 – 13 April 1944	Succeeded by SS-Brigadeführer Gustav Lombard
Preceded by SS-Standartenführer Friedrich-Wilhelm Bock	Commander of 19th Waffen Grenadier Division of the SS (2nd Latvian); 13 April 1944 – 8 May 1945	Succeeded by none
