= 8th SS Cavalry Division Florian Geyer =

German cavalry division

8th SS Cavalry Division "Florian Geyer"
- Unit insignia
- Active: 1941–45
- Country: Nazi Germany
- Branch: (Schutzstaffel) Waffen-SS
- Type: Cavalry
- Role: Bandenbekämpfung
- Size: Division
- Engagements: Siege of Budapest

Commanders
- Notable commanders: Gustav Lombard; Bruno Streckenbach; Hermann Fegelein; Wilhelm Bittrich

The 8th SS Cavalry Division "Florian Geyer" was a German Waffen-SS cavalry division during World War II. It was formed in 1942 from a cadre of the SS Cavalry Brigade which was involved in the Bandenbekämpfung ("bandit-fighting") operations behind the front line and was responsible for the killing of tens of thousands of the civilian population. It continued "pacification" operations in the occupied Soviet Union, leading to further atrocities.

== Formation ==
In March 1944, it was named after Florian Geyer (1490–1525), the Franconian nobleman who led the Black Company during the German Peasants' War. Veterans from the division formed the core of the 22nd SS Volunteer Cavalry Division, following the latter's creation on 29 April 1944.

== Operational history ==
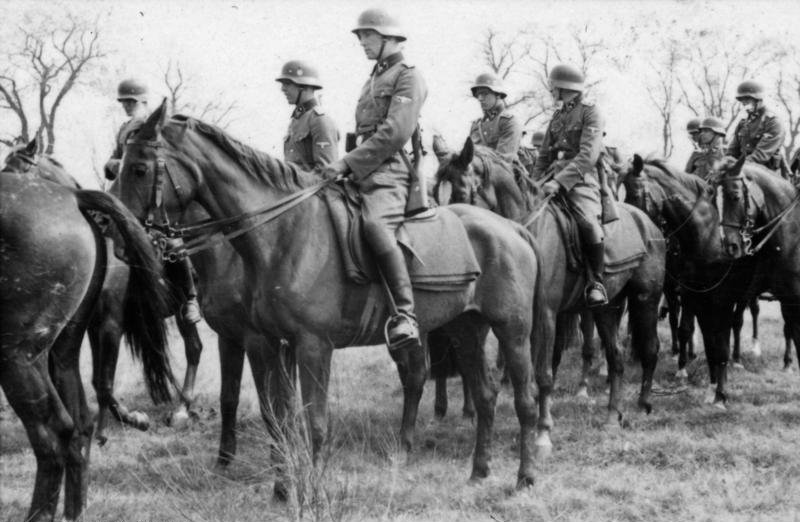
SS Cavalry Brigade 23 September 1941 USSR

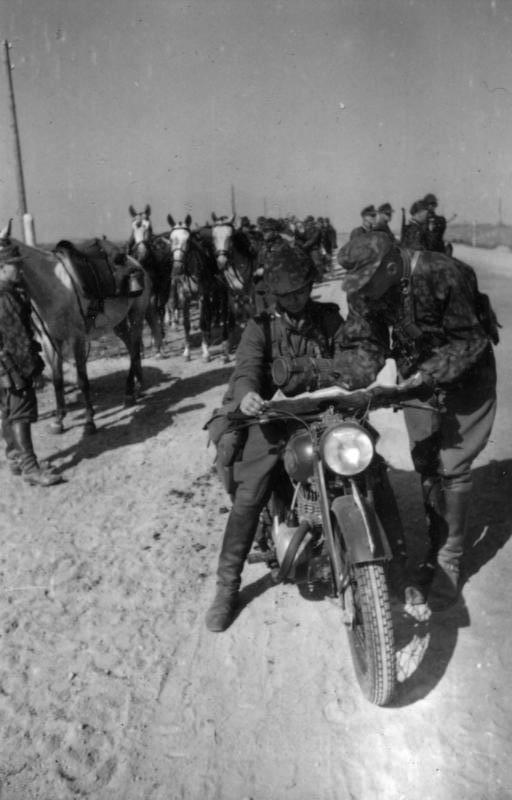
SS cavalry in the occupied Soviet Union, June 1942

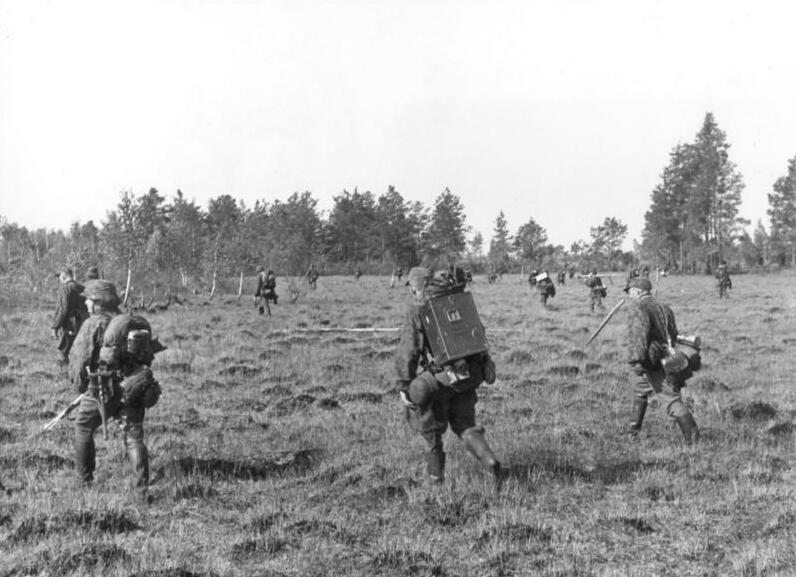
SS Cavalry Division on a Bandenbekämpfung sweep, May 1943

The newly created division was soon sent back to the Eastern Front and was stationed in the Rzhev and Orel sectors in central Russia until the spring of 1943, in the Army Group Centre Rear Area. As the Ninth Army planned the evacuation from the Rzhev salient in Operation Büffel in March 1943, the division took part in large-scale Bandenbekämpfung ("bandit-fighting") anti-partisan actions in the weeks before the operation, alongside elements of four Wehrmacht divisions and other SS and police units. An estimated 3,000 Russians were killed, the great majority of whom were unarmed: only 277 rifles, 41 pistols, 61 machine guns and 17 mortars were recovered. As part of the withdrawal, Ninth Army's commander Walter Model personally ordered the deportation of all male civilians, wells poisoned, and at least two dozen villages razed in a scorched earth policy to hinder the Red Army's follow up in the area.

The division was then moved to the area around Bobruisk, on internal security and Bandenbekämpfung duties until September 1943. In April and May 1943, the division's training battalion participated in the suppression of the Warsaw Ghetto Uprising. In September the division was moved to the Southern front and took part in the German retreat to the Dnieper river.

The division was then sent to Hungary in October 1943, where the Panzerjäger and Sturmgeschütz battalions were combined and the Reconnaissance Battalion became a Panzer Reconnaissance Battalion. Following this reorganization the division was posted to Croatia, and many new recruits volunteered to serve in March 1944, mainly young Danube Swabians (Shwoveh) with an average age of 15.5-16 years old drawn from Hungary and Romania. In April 1944, they returned to Hungary and took part in the fighting in Transylvania after the Romanian front collapsed.

The division was trapped in the Siege of Budapest with the IX SS Mountain Corps when the Soviet and Romanian forces surrounded the city in December 1944. The division was destroyed in the fighting for Budapest, and by the end of the siege, of the 30,000 men of the SS Corps, only about 800 reached German lines.

== Commanders ==
- SS-Brigadeführer Gustav Lombard (March 1942 – April 1942)
- SS-Gruppenführer Hermann Fegelein (April 1942 – August 1942)
- SS-Obergruppenführer Wilhelm Bittrich (August 1942 – 15 February 1943)
- SS-Brigadeführer Fritz Freitag (15 February 1943 – 20 April 1943)
- SS-Brigadeführer Gustav Lombard (20 April 1943 – 14 May 1943)
- SS-Gruppenführer Hermann Fegelein (14 May 1943 – 13 September 1943)
- SS-Gruppenführer Bruno Streckenbach (13 September 1943 – 22 October 1943)
- SS-Gruppenführer Hermann Fegelein (22 October 1943 – 1 January 1944)
- SS-Gruppenführer Bruno Streckenbach (1 January 1944 – 14 April 1944)
- SS-Brigadeführer Gustav Lombard (14 April 1944 – 1 July 1944)
- SS-Brigadeführer Joachim Rumohr (1 July 1944 – 11 February 1945)

== See also ==
- List of Waffen-SS units
