= 9th SS Panzer Division Hohenstaufen =

German armored division

- 9. SS-Panzerdivision "Hohenstaufen"
- Divisional insignia
- Active: February 1943 – May 1945
- Country: Nazi Germany
- Branch: (Schutzstaffel) Waffen-SS
- Type: Panzer
- Role: Armoured warfare
- Size: Division
- Engagements: World War II; Kamenets–Podolsky pocket; Falaise pocket; Operation Market Garden; Battle of the Bulge; Operation Spring Awakening

Commanders
- Notable commanders: Wilhelm Bittrich; Sylvester Stadler

The 9th SS Panzer Division "Hohenstaufen" (German: 9. SS-Panzerdivision "Hohenstaufen") (Note: Official designation in German language as to "Bundesarchiv-Militärarchiv“ in Freiburg im Breisgau, stores of the Wehrmacht and Waffen-SS.) was a Waffen-SS armoured division of Nazi Germany during World War II. It participated in battles on both the Eastern and Western Fronts. The division was activated in December 1942. Many of the men of the division were young German conscripts, with a cadre of NCOs and staff from the SS Division Leibstandarte and other Waffen SS divisions. Hohenstaufen took part in the relief of German forces in the Kamenets-Podolsky pocket, the Normandy battles, Operation Market Garden, the Ardennes Offensive and Operation Spring Awakening. The division surrendered to the United States Army on 8 May 1945, at Steyr.

== Formation and Eastern Front ==
The SS Division Hohenstaufen was formed, along with its sister formation 10th SS Division Frundsberg, in France in February 1943. The division was mainly formed from Reich Labour Service conscripts. Originally, Hohenstaufen was designated as a Panzergrenadier division, but in October 1943 it was upgraded to Panzer division status, with an estimated manpower of about 19,000. At its formation, Hohenstaufen was commanded by SS-Obergruppenführer Wilhelm Bittrich. The title Hohenstaufen came from the Hohenstaufen dynasty, a German noble family who produced a number of kings and emperors in the 12th and 13th centuries AD.

After the encirclement of General Hans-Valentin Hube's 1st Panzer Army in the Kamenets-Podolsky pocket in Ukraine, Field Marshal Erich von Manstein requested that the Hohenstaufen and Frundsberg divisions be sent to attempt to link up with the encircled force. Arriving in late March 1944, the divisions were formed into the II SS Panzer Corps and were sent into the attack near the town of Tarnopol. In three days of combat, the Hohenstaufen destroyed 74 Soviet tanks, 84 self propelled assault guns, 21 anti tank guns, and 12 mortars. After heavy fighting in the season of rasputitsa ("roadlessness"), the division effected a link-up with Hube's forces near the town of Buchach. The division's actions helped prevent the encirclement of the 1st Panzer Army. During these battles, Hohenstaufen had suffered 1,011 casualties. The II SS Panzer Corps was to act as reserve for Army Group North Ukraine. After the Allied invasion of northern France on 6 June 1944, the II SS Panzer Corps, including Hohenstaufen, was sent west on 12 June, to defend Caen in Normandy.

== Western Front ==
=== Normandy ===
Hohenstaufen suffered losses from Allied fighter bombers during its move to Normandy, delaying its arrival until 26 June 1944. Approximately 50% of the division's tanks broke down during its movement to Normandy. The division's armored forces would be reinforced by the newly attached 102nd SS Heavy Panzer Battalion. This would provide Hohenstaufen with 127 additional combat vehicles including 79 Panther tanks. The original plan for Hohenstaufen to attack towards the Allied beachhead was made impossible by a British offensive to take Caen. The II SS Panzer Corps was instead put into the line to support the weakened forces defending Caen, where Hohenstaufen suffered 1,891 casualties. On 10 July, the division was pulled back into reserve, to be replaced by the 277th Infantry Division. The division's depleted Panzergrenadier regiments were eventually merged to form Panzergrenadier Regiment Hohenstaufen. The division saw much action defending against British armour during Operation Goodwood. During Operation Jupiter Hohenstaufen destroyed 58 British tanks with many of them being Churchill tanks.

After the launch of the Canadian Operation Totalize, Hohenstaufen avoided encirclement in the Falaise pocket and kept the narrow escape route from this pocket open. By 21 August, the Battle of Normandy was over, and the German forces were in full retreat. Obersturmbannführer Walter Harzer was placed in command of the division. It fought several rearguard actions during the retreat through France and Belgium and in early September 1944, the exhausted formation was pulled out of the line for rest and refit near the Dutch city of Arnhem. By this time, Hohenstaufen was down to approximately 7,000 men, from 15,900 at the end of June.

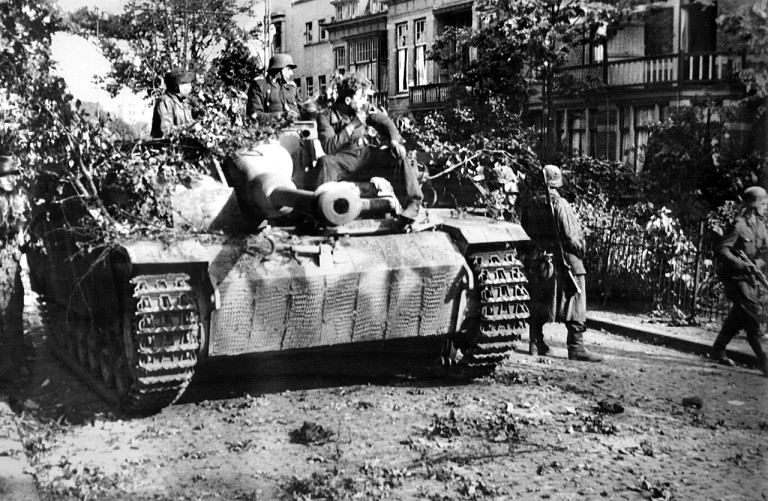
Soldiers ride a Sturmgeschütz III through the streets of Arnhem during Market Garden

=== Arnhem ===
Upon arriving in the Arnhem area, the majority of the remaining armoured vehicles were loaded onto trains in preparation for transport to repair depots in Germany. On Sunday, 17 September 1944, the Allies launched Operation Market-Garden, and the division fought in the Battle of Arnhem. The British 1st Airborne Division was dropped in Oosterbeek, to the west of Arnhem. Only the division's reconnaissance battalion, equipped mostly with wheeled and half tracked vehicles, was ready for action.

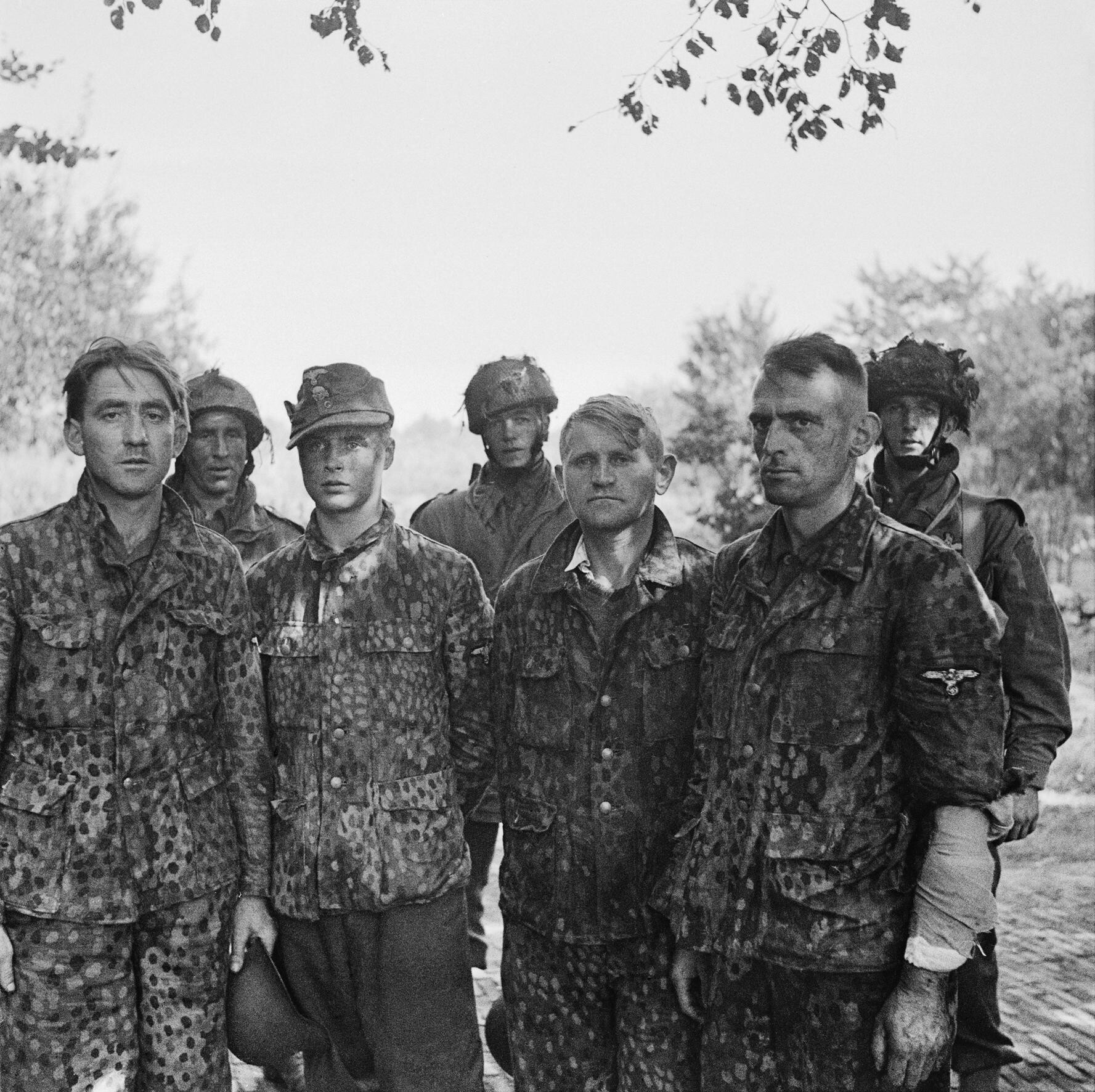
Members of the 9. SS Div. captured by British forces after the Battle of Arnhem

Bittrich ordered Hohenstaufen to occupy Arnhem and secure a vital metal girder bridge (later torn down, rebuilt in concrete and named John Frost Bridge). The division encountered stiff resistance from the British 1st Parachute Brigade. The Reconnaissance Battalion, a 40-vehicle unit commanded by Hauptsturmführer Viktor Eberhard Gräbner, was sent south over the bridge to scout the area around Nijmegen. The bridge had already been captured by the Germans. Meanwhile, Colonel John Dutton Frost's 2nd Battalion of the British 1st Airborne Division had advanced into Arnhem and prepared defensive positions at the northern end of the bridge. They destroyed Gräbner's unit, which lost 12 vehicles out of 22 in the assault and around 70 men killed, including Gräbner. This action is depicted in the film A Bridge Too Far. An examination of the aerial photograph taken after the battle appears to show around double the dozen destroyed reconnaissance vehicles, which is the more commonly accepted number.

=== Ardennes Offensive ===
After the battle of Arnhem, Hohenstaufen moved to Paderborn for a much-needed rest and refit. On 12 December 1944, the division moved south to the Munstereifel. It was to act as a reserve for Sepp Dietrich's 6th SS Panzer Army, a part of the Ardennes offensive (Unternehmen: Wacht am Rhein). The 6th Panzer Army was to attack in the north, along the line St. Vith–Vielsalm. Initially, only the divisional reconnaissance and artillery units were involved in the fighting but on 21 December, the entire division was committed. The 9th SS Division tried to breakthrough defensive positions of the 82nd Airborne Division but failed.

When the attack in the north stalled, the division was sent south to assist in the attacks on Bastogne, where it took heavy casualties from the American defenders and lost much of its equipment to Allied ground attack aircraft. On 7 January 1945, Hitler called off the operation and ordered all forces to concentrate around Longchamps, Belgium.

== Hungary and surrender ==
Throughout the rest of January 1945, Hohenstaufen retreated to the German border. At the end of the month, the division was transferred to the Kaifenheim-Mayen area to be refitted. At the end of February, the division was sent east to Hungary as a part of the reformed 6th SS Panzer Army under Sepp Dietrich. The division, along with the majority of the SS Panzer units available, was to take part in Operation Spring Awakening, the offensive near Lake Balaton, which was aimed at relieving the forces encircled in Budapest by the Red Army.

The attack got under way on 6 March 1945. Due to the condition of the roads, the division had not reached its jump-off position when the attack began. A combination of mud and stiff Soviet resistance brought the offensive to a halt and on 16 March a Soviet counter-offensive threatened to cut off the 6th SS Panzer Army. Hohenstaufen was involved in the fighting to escape the Soviet encirclement. During these actions, Hohenstaufen destroyed 80 Soviet T-34 and IS tanks. On 1 May, the greatly depleted division was moved west to the Steyr–Amstetten area. On 8 May 1945, Hohenstaufen surrendered to the Americans.

== Commanders ==
| No. | Portrait | Commander | Took office | Left office | Time in office |
|---|---|---|---|---|---|
| 1 | Wilhelm Bittrich | SS-Obergruppenführer; Wilhelm Bittrich (1894–1979) | 15 February 1943 | 29 June 1944 | 1 year, 135 days |
| 2 | Thomas Müller | SS-Standartenführer; Thomas Müller (1902–?) | 29 June 1944 | 10 July 1944 | 11 days |
| 3 | Sylvester Stadler | SS-Brigadeführer; Sylvester Stadler (1910–1995) | 10 July 1944 | 31 July 1944 | 21 days |
| 4 | Friedrich-Wilhelm Bock | SS-Oberführer; Friedrich-Wilhelm Bock (1897–1978) | 31 July 1944 | 29 August 1944 | 29 days |
| 5 | Walter Harzer | SS-Oberführer; Walter Harzer (1912–1982) | 29 August 1944 | 10 October 1944 | 42 days |
| (3) | Sylvester Stadler | SS-Brigadeführer; Sylvester Stadler (1910–1995) | 10 October 1944 | 8 May 1945 | 299 days |

== Organisation ==
Structure of the division:

- Headquarters: Berlin-Lichterfelde
  - 9th Panzer Regiment
  - 19th SS Panzergrenadier Regiment
  - 20th SS Panzergrenadier Regiment
  - 9th SS Panzer Artillery Regiment
  - 9th SS Panzer Reconnaissance Battalion
  - 9th SS Panzer Tank Destroyer Battalion
  - 9th SS Panzer Assault Gun Battalion
  - 9th SS Panzer Engineer Battalion
  - 9th SS Panzer Signal Battalion
  - 9th SS Panzer Anti-Aircraft Battalion
  - 9th SS Panzer Rocket Launcher Battalion
  - 9th SS Panzer Divisional Supply Group

== War crimes ==
Heinz Hagendorf, a medical NCO, was prosecuted at the Dachau trials for firing shots at American soldiers from an ambulance marked with a Red Cross emblem in Belgium on 15 January 1945. In August 1946, Hagendorf was found guilty and sentenced to six months in prison. The verdict and sentence were upheld on appeal.

In 1946, Markus Lienhart, a lieutenant, was prosecuted for the murders of three American airmen in Straßgang, Austria, on 4 March 1945. After their planes were shot down, the airmen had surrendered. An SS officer, Wilhelm Schweitzer, arrived and ordered one of police officers escorting the airmen to kill them. After the officer refused, Markus arrived and personally shot two of the airmen. The other airman was assaulted by Markus's father, Franz Lienhart. However, the attack was interrupted by an air raid. Afterwards, the airman was handed over to the SS and shot by unknown men.

Markus was found guilty of shooting the two airmen and sentenced to death. Franz, who was also prosecuted, was found guilty of assaulting the third airman and sentenced to 10 years in prison with hard labour. Markus was hanged in Salzburg on 26 October 1946. Due to crippling injuries that he suffered from an accident while in custody, Franz's sentence was reduced to three years. He died in 1957. Schweitzer was put on trial in 1948, found guilty of war crimes, and sentenced to death. However, in light of the controversy surrounding the Malmedy massacre trial, and that Markus Lienhart appeared to have shot two of the airmen entirely of his own volition, Schweitzer's sentence was commuted to life in prison. He was released in the 1950s, and died in 1993.

== See also ==
- List of Waffen-SS units
- SS Panzer Division order of battle
