= Fritz Freitag =

German SS commander

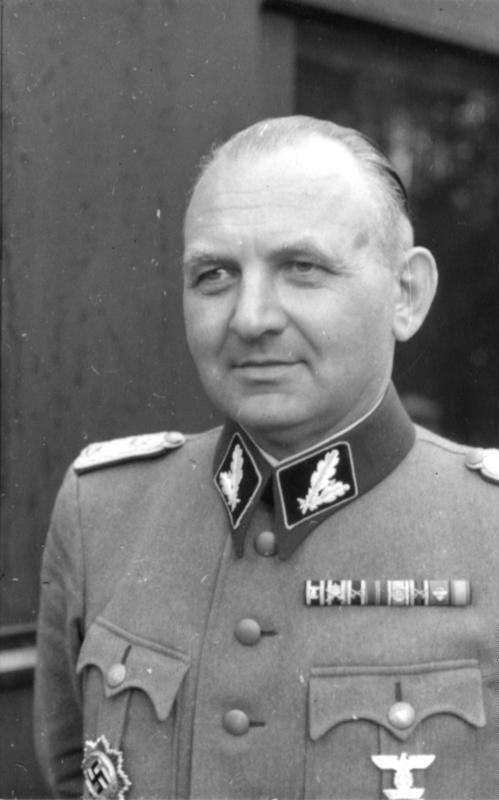
- Born: 28 April 1894; Allenstein, East Prussia
- Died: 10 May 1945 (aged 51); Graz, Allied-occupied Austria
- Military career
- Allegiance: Nazi Germany
- Branch: Waffen-SS
- Service years: 1914–1919; 1939–1945
- Rank: SS-Brigadeführer
- Commands: 2nd SS Infantry Brigade; SS Cavalry Division Florian Geyer; SS Division Galicia
- Conflicts: World War II
- Awards: Knight's Cross of the Iron Cross

Fritz Freitag (28 April 1894 – 10 May 1945) was a German SS commander during the Nazi era. During World War II, he commanded the 2nd SS Infantry Brigade, the SS Cavalry Division Florian Geyer, and the SS Division Galicia. Freitag committed suicide in May 1945.

== Career ==
Fritz Freitag was born in Allenstein, East Prussia, the son of a railroad official. After passing his high school examinations he joined the 1st (East Prussian) Grenadier Regiment of the Prussian Army. During World War I, Freitag served on both the Eastern Front and the Western Front. In 1919, Freitag joined the Freikorps and in 1920, the Schutzpolizei. By the time of World War II, Freitag had been promoted to Police Colonel. During the invasion of Poland, he was the Chief of Operations of the 3rd Police Regiment and the Chief of Staff to the senior police commander in the 14th Army, Udo von Woyrsch.

In September 1940, Freitag joined the Schutzstaffel (SS) and was posted onto the staff of Heinrich Himmler. He was then posted to the 1 SS Infantry Brigade as chief of staff. During the invasion of the Soviet Union, he organized rear-security operations in Belarus and assisted the Einsatzgruppen death squads in rounding up the Jewish population in the occupied territories.

Freitag was appointed commander of 2nd SS Polizei Infantry Regiment still serving on the Eastern Front. He was promoted to Standartenführer for his performance in command of a Kampfgruppe during the fighting in the Volkhov pocket. In January 1943, he was given temporary command of the SS Cavalry Division Florian Geyer being replaced when becoming ill. From April to August 1943 he commanded the 2 SS Infantry Brigade, and from 18 August 1943 till 20 October 1943 the 4th SS Polizei Division. He was then given command of the SS Division Galicia. He was awarded the Knight's Cross of the Iron Cross in September 1944.

Freitag shot himself in the village of St. Andrä on 10 May 1945.

== Awards ==
- Knight's Cross of the Iron Cross on 30 September 1944 as SS-Brigadeführer and Generalmajor of the Waffen-SS, and commander of the 14. Waffen-Grenadier-Division der SS (gal. Nr. 1).
