= Graignes =

Graignes may refer to:

- Graignes-Mesnil-Angot, a commune in Normandy, France
  - Graignes, Manche, a former commune, now part of Graignes-Mesnil-Angot
- Battle of Graignes (June 10–12, 1944), a World War II battle near Graignes, France

== See also ==
- Graines
