= Battle of Carentan =

1944 battle of World War II

- Part of Operation Overlord, Battle of Normandy
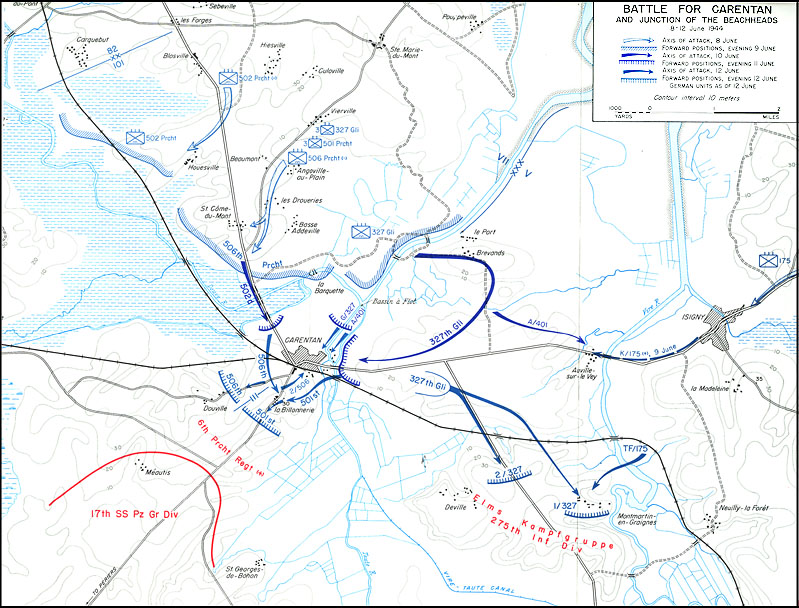
- Scheme of attack, Battle of Carentan
Date	10–14 June 1944
Location	49°18′18″N 1°14′58″W; Carentan, France
Result	American victory

Belligerents
United States	Germany

Commanders and leaders
(United States) Maxwell D. Taylor (United States) Anthony McAuliffe (United States) Maurice Rose (United States) Robert Sink	(Nazi Germany) Friedrich von der Heydte (Nazi Germany) Werner Ostendorff

Units involved
101st Airborne Division; 2nd Armored Division	2nd Parachute Division: 6th Fallschirmjäger Regiment; 91st Infantry Division: 1058th Grenadier Regiment; Elements of the 17th SS Panzergrenadier Division

Strength
11 airborne infantry battalions 1 tank battalion 1 mechanized infantry battalion	2 parachute infantry battalions 2 Infantry battalions 2 panzergrenadier battalions 1 panzer battalion with assault guns

Casualties and losses
At least 400 KIA Hundreds wounded 4 Tanks Destroyed	800+ KIA 2 Tanks destroyed

The Battle of Carentan was an engagement in World War II between airborne forces of the United States Army and the German Wehrmacht during the Battle of Normandy. The battle took place from 10 to 14 June 1944, on the approaches to and within the town of Carentan, France.

The objective of the attacking American forces was consolidation of the U.S. beachheads (Utah Beach and Omaha Beach) and establishment of a continuous defensive line against expected German counterattacks. The defending German force attempted to hold the town long enough to allow reinforcements en route from the south to arrive, prevent or delay the merging of the lodgments, and keep the U.S. First Army from launching an attack towards Lessay-Périers that would cut off the Cotentin Peninsula.

Carentan was defended by two battalions of Fallschirmjäger-Regiment 6 (6th Parachute Regiment) of the 2nd Fallschirmjäger-Division. The 17th SS Panzergrenadier Division, ordered to reinforce Carentan, was delayed by transport shortages and attacks by Allied aircraft. The attacking 101st Airborne Division, landed by parachute on 6 June as part of the American airborne landings in Normandy, was ordered to seize control of Carentan.

In the ensuing battle, the 101st forced passage across the causeway into Carentan on 10 and 11 June. A lack of ammunition forced the German forces to withdraw on 12 June. The 17th SS PzG Division counter-attacked the 101st Airborne on 13 June. Initially successful, its attack was thrown back by Combat Command A (CCA) of the U.S. 2nd Armored Division.

== Background ==
=== Operation Overlord ===
On 6 June 1944, the Allies launched a massive and long-anticipated air and amphibious invasion of Normandy, codenamed Operation Overlord. The 101st Airborne Division paratroopers landed behind Utah Beach with the objective of blocking German reinforcements from attacking the flank of the U.S. VII Corps during its primary mission of seizing the port of Cherbourg. The glider troopers landed by glider and ships on 6 and 7 June.

Merging the American beachheads at Utah and Omaha Beach was a D-Day objective of the amphibious forces but was not achieved because of heavy German resistance at Omaha. Moreover, Allied intelligence believed that three German divisions were massing to drive a wedge between them. Exercising operational command of both 1st US Army and the 2nd British Army as Land forces commander, British General Montgomery gave verbal orders for Lt General Bradley's forces to make the link up quickly. Supreme Allied Commander General Dwight D. Eisenhower concurred with Montgomery's order for a "concentrated effort" to make the linkup. General Eisenhower was not yet in operational command and being kept up to date with the battles from daily phone calls from the 21st Army Group's chief of staff.

Lieutenant General Omar Bradley, senior American ground commander, ordered the original tactical plan be changed to make the top priority of U.S. operations the joining of the lodgments through Isigny and Carentan. VII Corps received the Carentan assignment and assigned the 101st Airborne Division, closest to the city, "the sole task of capturing Carentan."

=== Geography ===
Carentan is a port city located in Normandy, France, in the Douve River valley at the base of the Cotentin Peninsula. At the time of the Second World War, Carentan's civilian population was about four thousand. Four major highways and a railroad converged in the city, from Cherbourg to the northwest, Bayeux and Caen to the east, Saint-Lô to the southeast, and Coutances to the southwest. The city is dominated by high ground to the southwest and southeast, all of which was under German control during the battle. Its other three approaches are bordered by watercourses: the Douve River to the west and north, a boat basin to the northeast, and the Vire-Taute Canal to the east. The Germans flooded much of the Douve River floodplain prior to the invasion, resulting in a marshland impassable to vehicles and difficult to cross by infantry, a tactic once used by Napoleon Bonaparte at the same location.

The highway from Saint Côme-du-Mont crossed the floodplain via a narrow 1.5 kilometres (1 mi) long causeway having banks rising 2 to 2.5 metres (6 to 9 ft) above the marsh. Four bridges spanned the Douve and several tributaries along the causeway. Troops in the open under fire could find cover only by digging in on the sloping eastern bank of the causeway. In retreating from Saint Côme-du-Mont, the Germans had blown up Bridge No. 2 on the causeway and a portion of the railroad embankment as well.

=== Forces ===
Carentan was defended by two battalions of Fallschirmjäger-Regiment 6 (6th Parachute Regiment) of the 2nd Fallschirmjäger-Division, commanded by Oberst Friedrich von der Heydte, and remnants of 91 Air Landing Division's Grenadier-Regiment 1058. Both had escaped from nearby Saint Côme-du-Mont on 8 June when the village was captured by the 101st Airborne Division. II./FJR6 and III./FJR6 (2nd and 3rd Battalions, 6th Parachute Regiment) were still intact as fighting formations, but III./GR1058 had been nearly destroyed in three days of combat and was no longer effective as a unit.

The German LXXXIV Corps (84.Korps) reinforced the 6th Parachute Regiment (FJR6) with survivors of Grenadier-Regiment 914 (German 352nd Infantry Division) following its 9 June defeat at Isigny. Army Group B commander Field Marshal Erwin Rommel ordered von der Heydte to defend the town "to the last man."

The 17th SS Panzergrenadier Division stationed at Thouars, ostensibly a mechanized infantry division of the OKW Mobile Reserve but without tanks or adequate transport, was ordered on 7 June to move to Normandy following the Allied landings. However, it was delayed by shortages of trucks and attacks by Allied aircraft that destroyed bridges over the Loire River and interdicted rail movements. Advance elements reached Angers on 9 June and Saint-Lô on 10 June, by which time Rommel's main concern was in preventing an attack westward from Carentan to cut off the Cotentin. The 38th Panzergrenadier Regiment formed a mobile battle group to resist V Corps units south of Isigny, and the 37th PzG-Rgt was sent to Carentan.

The 101st Airborne Division consolidated its forces in Normandy on 9 June. Its three parachute regiments (501st, 502nd, and 506th PIRs) had been badly scattered during their air drops, losing a significant number of men killed and missing as a result, and had suffered further casualties in taking Saint Côme-du-Mont. Its 327th Glider Infantry Regiment had landed largely at Utah Beach on D+1 (7 June) and except for its third battalion (the attached 1st Battalion, 401st GIR), had yet to engage in serious combat. Several units of the 327 did land by ship on D-Day. The 327 HQ Co Anti-Tank Platoon glided into France.

The 2nd Armored Division, part of the U.S. V Corps, had advanced off Omaha Beach to support the drive of the 175th Infantry Regiment (29th Division) to Isigny. Its Combat Command A (CCA), consisting of M4 Sherman tanks of the 2nd Battalion, 66th Armored Regiment and mechanized infantry of the 3rd Battalion, 41st Armored Infantry Regiment, was available as an armored force reserve for the 101st Airborne.

== Battle ==
On 9 June the 101st finished consolidating, with the 502nd PIR guarding the right flank along the upper Douve River, the 506th PIR deployed across the Carentan highway, and the 327th GIR on the left in positions along the Douve River opposite Brévands. The 501st PIR was the division's reserve and guarding the left flank east of the 327.

Patrols and aerial reconnaissance of Carentan indicated that the town might be lightly defended, and a plan to capture the city by a double envelopment was contrived, using the 502nd PIR on the right and the 327th GIR on the left, scheduled to jump off just after midnight 10 June. The 502nd's mission was to force the bridges and capture high ground southwest of the town along the Périers highway (Hill 30) to block withdrawal. The 327th was to cross the Douve at Brévands, circle a mile to the east, and come in on the road west from Isigny to take the town.

=== Purple Heart Lane, 10 June ===
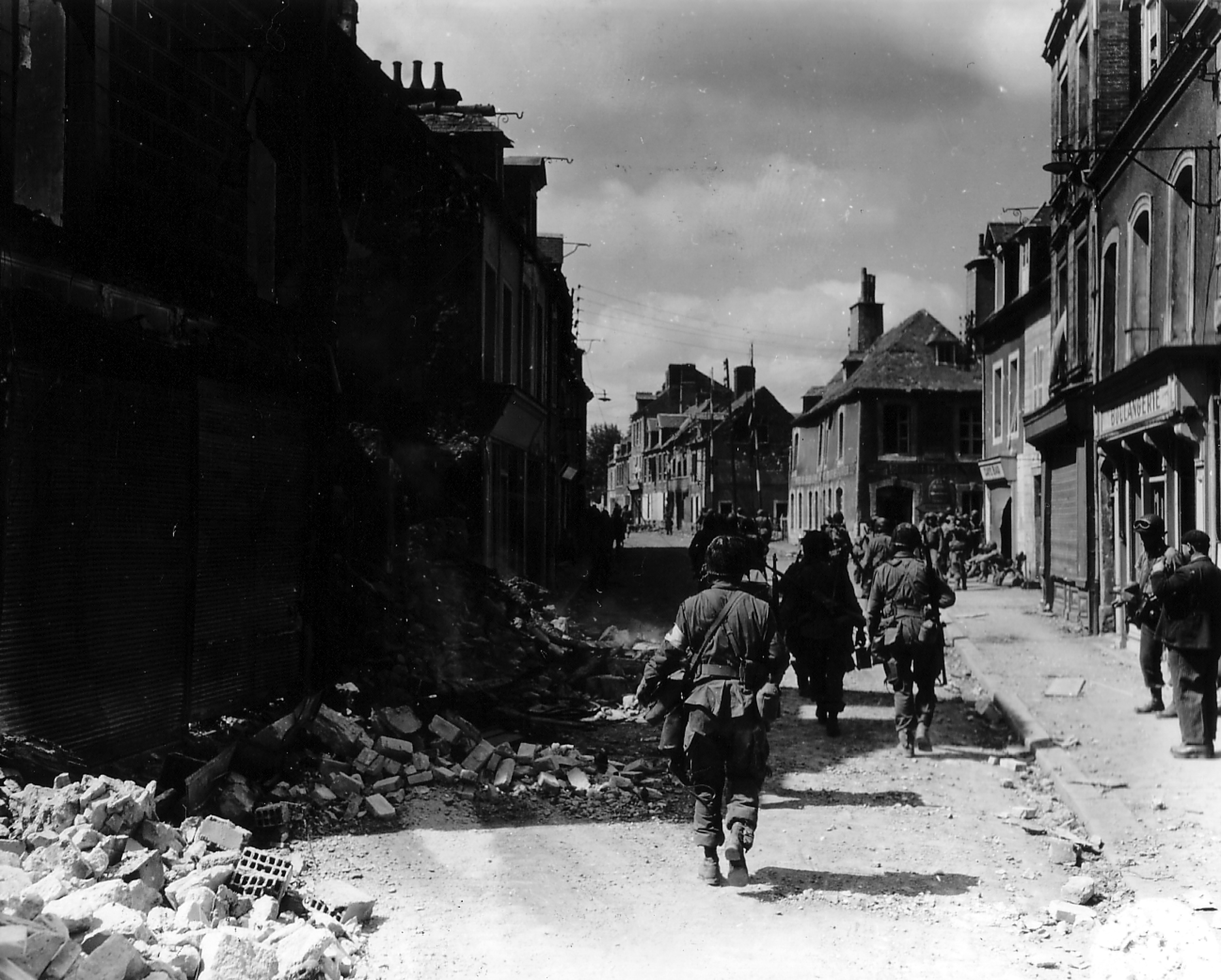
American soldiers in the streets of Carentan. Exact date unknown.

Leading the attack of the 502nd, the 3rd Battalion (3rd/502nd PIR) under Lt Col. Robert G. Cole found Bridge No. 2 (the Douve bridge) unrepaired and the engineers assigned to the task pinned down by fire from an 88mm gun. Cole sent his S-2, 1st Lt. Ralph B. Gehauf, with a patrol across the river in a small boat. They made their way to the last bridge, which they found blocked by a Belgian gate. The patrol was able to push the obstacle aside only 18 inches (46 cm), just enough for one soldier at a time to negotiate. The patrol soon came under flare illumination, mortar, and machine gun fire and eventually returned at 05:30, when the attack was postponed. Most of the fire appeared to be coming from a large farmhouse (49°18′44.6″N 1°15′37.2″W) and a hedgerow on higher ground 230 metres (250 yd) to the right of the highway beyond Bridge No. 4.

The 327th GIR's 1st and 2nd Battalions crossed the Douve River during the early morning hours of 10 June. 1st Battalion received friendly fire casualties from US mortars during the crossing by rubber boat. Some units waded across the river. After reaching the east bank in the early daylight hours the 327th GIR swung south towards Catz. 1st Battalion attacked on the south side of the Isigny highway and 2nd Battalion was on the north side. With Company G in the 2nd Battalion lead, heavy casualties were received as they approached Carentan. G Company was placed in reserve and was attached to the 3d Battalion of the 327th (401). In the early daylight hours of the 11th, Company A of the 401st (3Bn) and Co G of the 327th attacked southward along the Bassin a Flot, again taking heavy casualties.

At 01:45 1st/327th GIR began crossing the footbridges over the lower Douve, and by 06:00, under cover of artillery fire, the entire regiment was across. It captured Brévands and began the five-kilometre (3 mi) movement south and west. Company A of the 401st GIR, accompanied by the Division Assistant G-3, left the column and marched east toward Auville-sur-le-Vey to link up with the U.S. 29th Infantry Division. The 327th did not encounter serious opposition until it approached the bridges spanning the Vire-Taute Canal east of Carentan at 18:00. It went into the attack with two battalions on line and by midnight held the east bank.

The Douve bridge was still not repaired when 3rd/502d PIR returned at noon. The paratroopers used engineer materials at hand to improvise a footbridge and began their attack shortly after 13:00. Moving single file down the causeway and advancing by crouching and crawling, the point of the 400-man battalion reached Bridge No. 4 at about 16:00, with most of the unit past Bridge No. 3. Under artillery and mortar fire, and then sniper and machine gun fire as they got within range, casualties among the 3rd/502nd PIR became heavy. Nightfall ended the advance but not the casualties, when an attack at 23:30 by two low-flying German Ju 87 Stukas strafing the causeway killed 30 men and knocked I Company completely out of the battle. The severe casualties suffered by the 3rd/502d PIR, estimated at 67% of the original force, resulted in the nickname "Purple Heart Lane" applied to that portion of the Carentan-Sainte-Mère-Église highway.

=== Cole's charge, 11 June ===
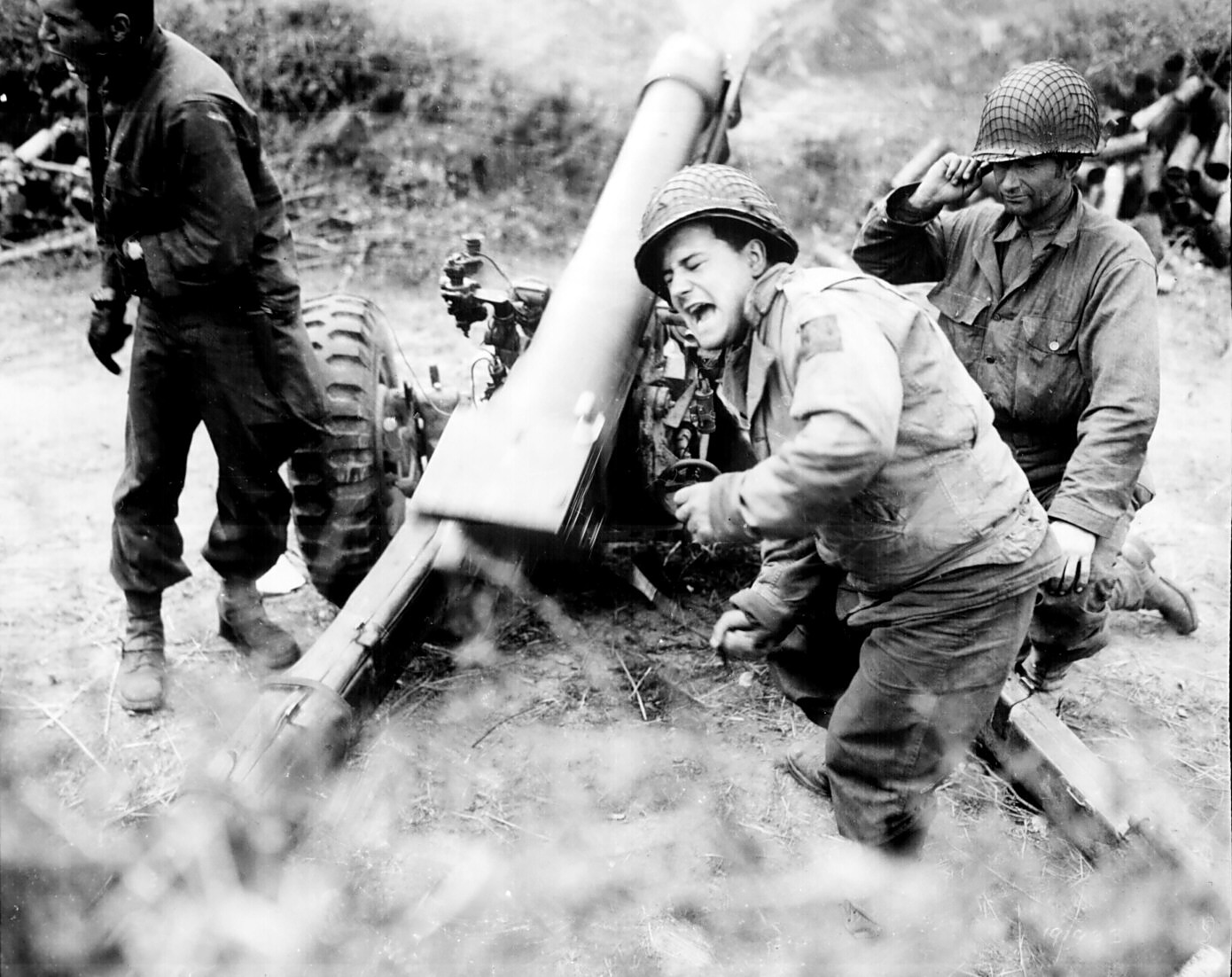
American howitzers shelling retreating German forces.

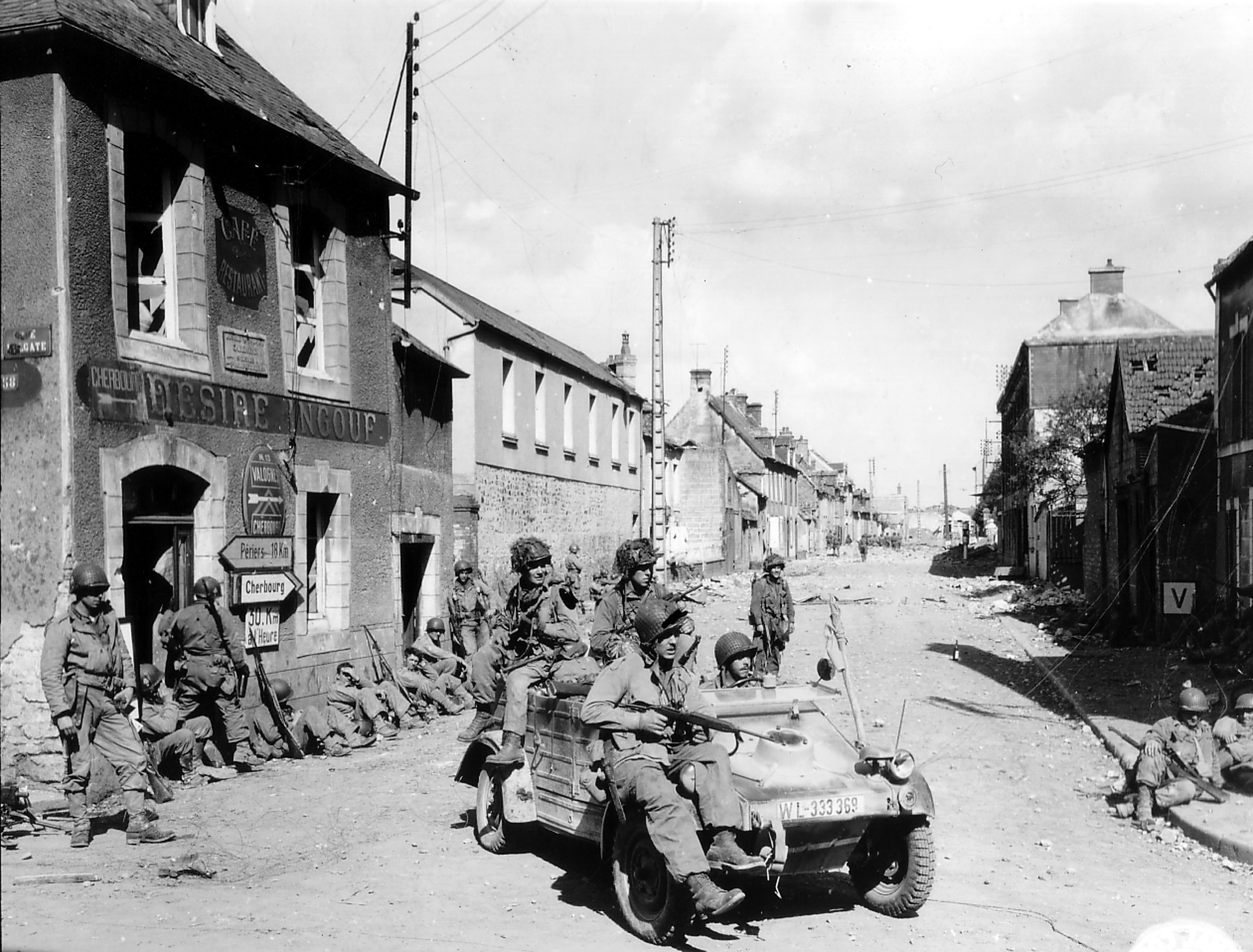
American paratroopers using a captured Kübelwagen in the town of Carentan.

During the night German fire subsided. Company H crept through the opening in the obstacle, and when it did not suffer any casualties, at 0400 Company G and the Headquarters Company followed, taking cover on both sides of the highway. Scouts in the point nearly reached the main farmhouse in the morning twilight when they were cut down by German fire. Lt. Col. Cole immediately called for artillery support, but the German fire did not cease. At 06:15, using a smoke screen for concealment, Lt Col. Cole ordered his executive officer, Major John P. Stopka, to pass word to the battalion that it would have to charge the German positions to eliminate them.

Using a whistle to signal the attack, Cole led a bayonet charge that overwhelmed the defenders in savage close combat, for which Cole was later awarded the Medal of Honor. At first only a small portion of the battalion, approximately 20 men, charged, but Stopka quickly followed with 50 more. The attack picked up impetus as the other paratroopers observed it in progress and joined it, crossing a ditch. Overrunning the empty farmhouse, men of Company H found many German paratroopers dug in along the hedgerow behind it. Companies H and G killed them with hand grenades and bayonets but at severe cost to themselves.

The survivors of 3rd/502nd PIR set up defensive positions and requested 1st Battalion 502nd PIR continue the attack. Lt Col. Patrick F. Cassidy's battalion, however, also took serious casualties from mortar fire and could only strengthen Lt Col. Cole's defensive line, taking up positions from the 3rd Battalion command post in the farmhouse to the highway. During a 2-hour truce at mid-day in which U.S. forces attempted to negotiate for removal of casualties, Company C 502nd moved forward from Bridge No. 4 into a cabbage patch between the second and third hedgerows. Company A 502nd moved up just behind Company C and extended its line across the highway. Fighting at the cabbage patch during the afternoon often took place at extremely close range with the contending forces on opposite sides of the same hedgerow.

Except for the noon truce, which FJR6 also used to resupply and reorganize, the American forces repelled repeated attacks. The final one nearly succeeded in overwhelming the 3rd/502nd PIR at 1830, gaining all but the final hedgerow between it and the Douve River. However, Lt Col. Cole's artillery officer, able to overcome jamming of his radio, called down a concentration of VII Corps Artillery so close that several Americans were also killed. The overwhelming violence of the 5-minute barrage rolled back the last German counterattack.

Patrols from the 327th had discovered a partially destroyed footbridge over the Vire-Taute Canal at the point where it connected with the Douve, northeast of the city. The bridge was repaired by 10:00, and a company each of the 2nd (Company G) and 3rd battalions (Company A 401) crossed and attacked down the forested banks of the boat basin (Bassin à Flot), but like the 502nd, were stopped 800 metres (0.5 mi) short of Carentan by machine gun and mortar fires that artillery could not suppress.

FJR6, nearly out of ammunition, withdrew during the night, leaving only a small rear guard. A Luftwaffe parachute resupply drop that night eleven kilometres (7 mi) to the southwest arrived too late to help. The 17th SS Panzergrenadier Division (Generalmajor der Waffen-SS Werner Ostendorff), on the road toward Carentan since D-Day, had been delayed by air attack and lack of fuel. By nightfall on 11 June only a few advanced elements had reached the division's assembly areas.

=== Carentan captured, 12 June ===
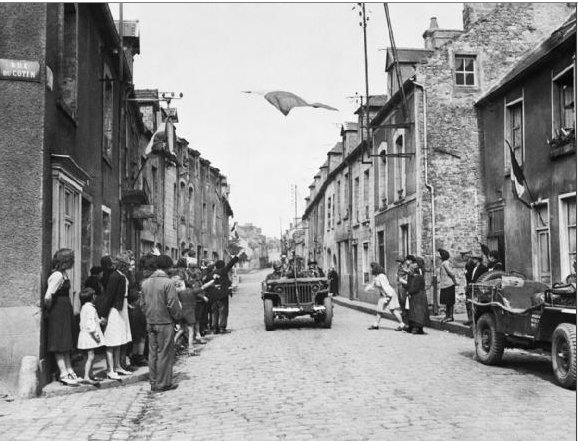
US 7th Corps jeep passes under the French flag as civilians thank the Americans after liberating the town.

To complete the capture of Carentan, Gen. Courtney Hodges of First Army created a task force under Gen. Anthony McAuliffe to coordinate the final assault. The mission to take Hill 30 was reassigned to the 506th PIR, the attack along the Bassin à Flot was renewed, and the 501st PIR was relieved of its defensive positions to circle behind the 327th GIR and approach Hill 30 from the east. The movements were covered by an all-night artillery bombardment of Carentan using naval gunfire, Corps artillery, 4.2-inch mortars, and tank destroyers that had joined the 327th GIR along the eastern canal.

Two battalions of the 506th moved down the Carentan causeway after dark, passed through the 2nd/502nd PIR at 02:00 on 12 June, and marched cross country to Hill 30 (the village of la Billonnerie), which they captured by 05:00. The 1st Battalion took up defensive positions facing south across the highway, while the 2nd Battalion was ordered north to attack the city. The 501st PIR during the night moved into position behind the 327th Glider Infantry, crossed the canal, and reached Hill 30 by 06:30.

At 06:00 Carentan was attacked from the north by 1st/401st GIR and the south by 2nd/506th PIR. Both units encountered machine gun fire from the rear guard, but the 2nd/506th was also sporadically shelled by artillery to the south of Carentan. Despite this, both units swiftly cleaned out the rear guard in a short fight near the railway station and advanced on the streets ending with the enemies' forces, then the US paratroopers met at 07:30 in the center of town after brief combat. The 1st/506th PIR engaged in more serious combat south of town when it had to rescue Col. Sink's command post, surrounded because it had pushed too far towards the German lines in the dark.

In the afternoon both the 506th and 501st advanced southwest but after a mile were stopped by heavy contacts with new German units including a few tanks. The 17th SS Panzergrenadier Division had intended to counterattack to retake Carentan, but its assault guns were held up in the assembly areas by Allied air attacks. Instead infantry units dug in on higher ground below the city and battled the paratroopers until dark.

=== Bloody Gulch, 13 June ===
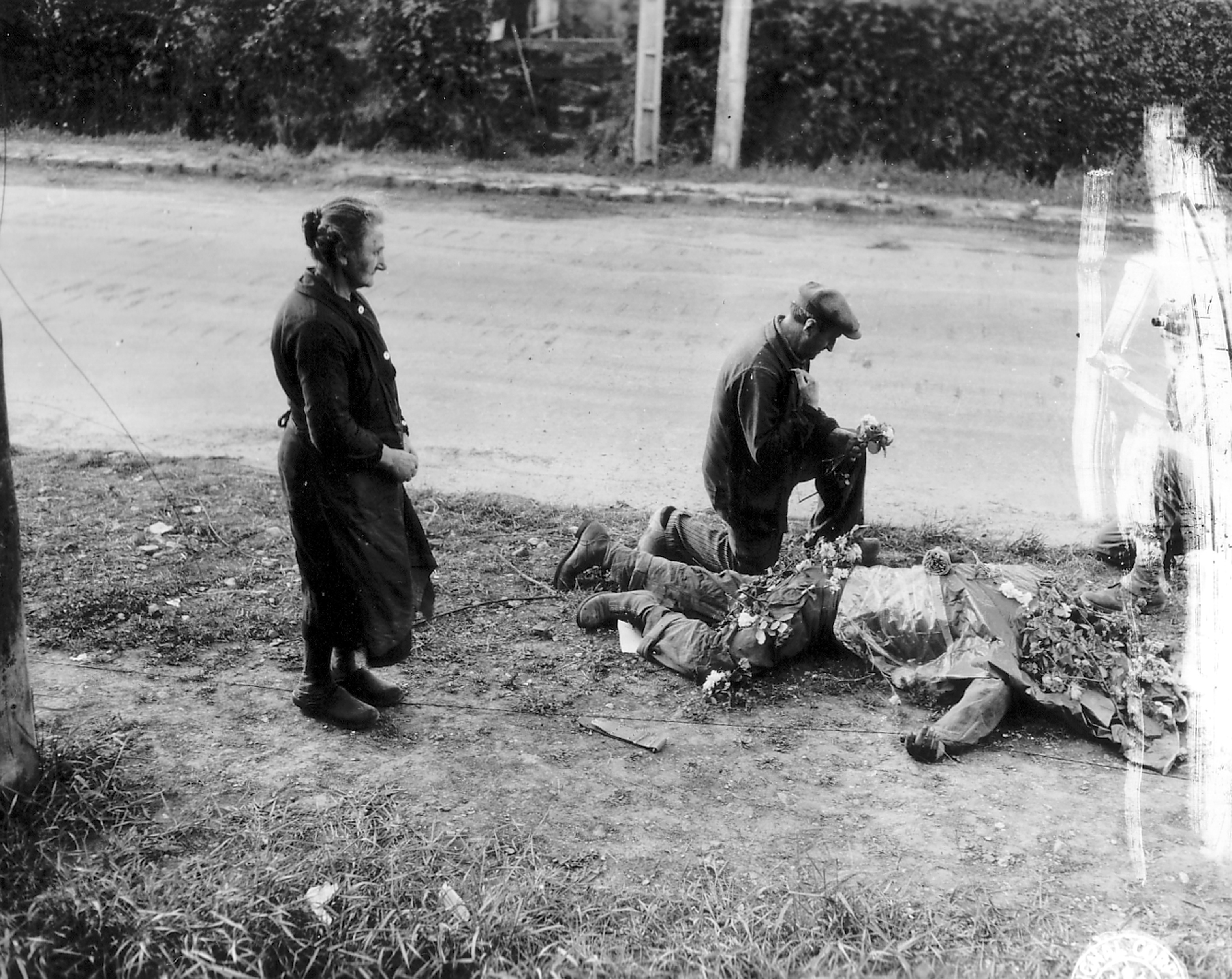
French civilians laying flowers on the corpse of a fallen American soldier.

At dawn on 13 June, the 101st Airborne was about to attack the German line when it was attacked by tanks and assault guns. Two battalions of the 37th SS Panzergrenadier Regiment, supported by the 17th SS Panzer Battalion and III./FJR6, struck hard at the 501st PIR on the American left, which fell back under heavy pressure. The left flank companies (Dog and Fox Companies) of the 506th then gave way, and by noon the spearheads of the German attack were within 450 metres (500 yd) of Carentan. However, Company E (Easy) of the 506th, commanded by 1st Lt. Richard D. Winters, anchored its right flank against a railroad embankment and held its position. Reinforced by the 2nd/502nd PIR taking position on its right, Easy Company slowed the German attack until American tanks could be brought up.

Reacting to an Ultra warning of the size and threat of the counterattack, Lieutenant General Bradley diverted CCA U.S. 2nd Armored Division (commanded by Brig. Gen. Maurice Rose and near Isigny sur mer) to Carentan at 10:30. At 14:00 CCA attacked, supported by the self-propelled howitzers of the 14th Armored Field Artillery Battalion. One task force of tanks and mechanized infantry surged down the road to Baupte in the 2nd/506th's area and shattered the main German thrust. A second task force drove back German forces along the Périers highway, inflicting heavy losses in men and equipment. CCA, followed by the 502nd PIR, then pushed west a mile beyond the original lines.

The counterattack became known anecdotally among the surviving paratroopers as the "Battle of Bloody Gulch".

== See also ==
- Carentan O Carentan, A poem by Louis Simpson about a German machine-gun ambush inspired by his experiences at the Battle of Carentan.
- Band of Brothers, an HBO TV miniseries that portrays Company E, 506th PIR's role in the battle
- Brothers in Arms: Road to Hill 30, a video game that is based on events during the battle
- Company of Heroes, a video game that depicts the role of Company F, 506th PIR during the battle
