= Gerhard Lindner =

- Born: 26 December 1896
- Died: 4 June 1982 (aged 85)
- Military career
- Allegiance: Nazi Germany
- Branch: German Army
- Rank: Generalmajor
- Commands: SS Division Götz von Berlichingen; 346th Infantry Division
- Conflicts: World War II
- Awards: Knight's Cross of the Iron Cross

Gerhard Lindner (26 December 1896 – 3 June 1982) was a general in the Wehrmacht of Nazi Germany during World War II. He was a recipient of the Knight's Cross of the Iron Cross. After the war, he was taken prisoner and interned until 1947.

== Awards and decorations ==
- Knight's Cross of the Iron Cross on 5 May 1945 as Generalmajor and commander of 346. Infanterie-Division

Military offices
Preceded by Standartenführer Hans Lingner	Commander of 17. SS-Panzergrenadier-Division "Götz von Berlichingen"; 9 January 1945 – 21 January 1945	Succeeded by Standartenführer Fritz Klingenberg
Preceded by Generalleutnant Walter Steinmüller	Commander of 346. Infanterie-Division; 1 February 1945 – 8 May 1945	Succeeded by None
