= Otto Baum =

Nazi commander (1911–1998)

- Born: 15 November 1911; Stetten, German Empire
- Died: 18 June 1998 (aged 86); Hechingen-Stetten, Germany
- Military career
- Allegiance: Nazi Germany
- Branch: Waffen-SS
- Service years: 1934–45
- Rank: SS-Oberführer
- Service number: NSDAP #4,197,040; SS #237,056
- Commands: 16th SS Panzergrenadier Division Reichsführer-SS; 2nd SS Division Das Reich
- Conflicts: World War II
- Awards: Knight's Cross of the Iron Cross with Oak Leaves and Swords

Otto Baum (15 November 1911 – 18 June 1998) was a high-ranking commander (Oberführer) of the Waffen-SS during World War II. He was a recipient of the Knight's Cross of the Iron Cross with Oak Leaves and Swords of Nazi Germany.

== Life and career ==
Baum was born on 15 November 1911 in Hechingen-Stetten, a son of a merchant. From 1930 to 1932, he studied two semesters of agriculture at the University of Hohenheim. He served as a battalion commander in 3rd SS Totenkopf Infantry Regiment during the Operation Barbarossa, invasion of the Soviet Union. After recovering from severe wounds in 1943, Baum was promoted to regimental commander, and eventually reached the rank of SS-Oberführer. He took command of the SS Division Das Reich in July 1944, and saw action in the Falaise Pocket. After the war, Baum was interned by the British until December 1948.

== Awards ==
- SA Sports Badge in Bronze, 1 December 1936
- Degen (SS), 13 September 1936
- Julleuchter, December 1936
- SS-Ehrenring, 1 December 1937
- Anschluss Medal, 13 March 1938
- 1939 Iron Cross 2nd Class, 25 September 1939
- 1939 Iron Cross 1st Class, 15 June 1940
- Infantry Assault Badge in Bronze, 3 October 1940
- Tank Destruction Badge
- German Cross in Gold, 26 December 1941 as SS-Sturmbannführer in the III./SS-Infanterie-Regiment 3
- Eastern Front Medal, 1942
- Wound Badge in Silver, 21 August 1943
- Demyansk Shield, 31 December 1943
- Knight's Cross of the Iron Cross with Oak Leaves and Swords
  - Knight's Cross on 8 May 1942 as SS-Sturmbannführer and commander of the III./SS-Totenkopf-Infanterie-Regiment 3
  - 277th Oak Leaves on 22 August 1943 as SS-Obersturmbannführer and commander of SS-Panzergrenadier-Regiment "Thule".
  - 95th Swords on 2 September 1944 as SS-Standartenführer and commander 2. SS-Panzer-Division "Das Reich"

Military offices
| Preceded by SS-Standartenführer Otto Binge | Commander of 17th SS Panzergrenadier Division Götz von Berlichingen; 18 June 1944 – 1 August 1944 | Succeeded by SS-Standartenführer Otto Binge |
| Preceded by SS-Standartenführer Christian Tychsen | Commander of 2nd SS Division Das Reich; 28 July 1944 – 23 October 1944 | Succeeded by SS-Gruppenführer Heinz Lammerding |
| Preceded by SS-Gruppenführer Max Simon | Commander of 16th SS Panzergrenadier Division Reichsführer-SS; 24 October 1944 – 8 May 1945 | Succeeded by None |
