= Battle of Graignes =

WWII battle in Normandy

- Part of the American airborne landings in Normandy
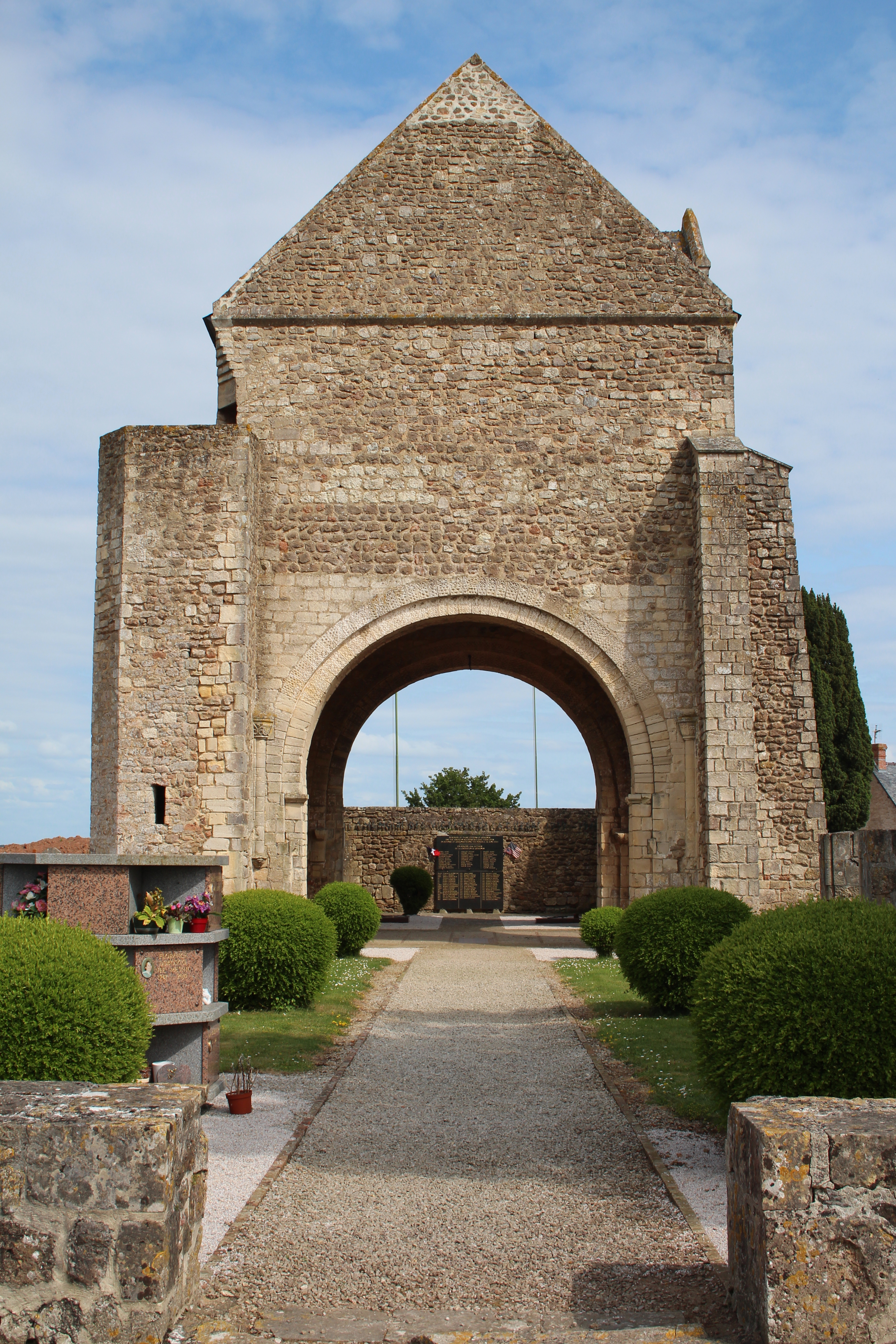
- Memorial to the citizens of Graignes and American paratroopers of the U.S. 82nd Airborne Division
Date	June 10–12, 1944
Location	Graignes, France 49.25°N 1.2°W

Belligerents
United States	(Nazi Germany) Germany

Commanders and leaders
Charles D. Johnston †; Leroy D. Brummitt	Werner Ostendorff

Strength
182 paratroopers of the 3rd Battalion, 507th Parachute Infantry Regiment and small group of B Company of the 501st Parachute Infantry Regiment and two soldiers of the 81st Airborne Antiaircraft Artillery Battalion	17th SS Panzergrenadier Division Götz von Berlichingen

Casualties and losses
32 dead (incl. 17 executed)	Unknown
- 26 civilians executed

The Battle of Graignes was part of the American airborne landings in Normandy during the early stages of Operation Overlord in World War II, fought between June 10–12, 1944 in Graignes, France. During the engagement, American paratroopers of the U.S. 82nd Airborne Division held the town for two days against the 17th SS Panzergrenadier Division Götz von Berlichingen. This action delayed the 17th SS Panzergrenadier's counterattack on Carentan, which was repulsed at the Battle of Bloody Gulch on June 13. After retaking Graignes, the German troops massacred 44 civilians and a number of prisoners of war taken in the capture of an American aid station, and set fire to the town.

== Landings and village assistance ==
Shortly after 02:00 hours on D-Day, Tuesday, 6 June 1944, twelve planeloads of American paratroopers from the 3rd Battalion, 507th Parachute Infantry Regiment, part of the U.S. 82nd Airborne Division, were scattered throughout the marshes south of Carentan. They were supposed to have been dropped 18 miles to the northwest at drop zone “T” near Amfreville, but instead ended-up in the vicinity of the French village of Graignes. Theirs was the worst mis-drop of any U.S. airborne unit on D-Day.

By 1000 hours, twenty-five paratroopers under the command of 507th Captain Leroy D. Brummitt had gathered in the village. Two hours later, more 3rd Battalion/507th men arrived, led by Major Charles D. Johnston. Because the troopers were deep behind enemy lines and far from their drop zone, the decision was made to remain where they had landed and defend Graignes.

As the Americans went to work preparing defensive positions, the mortar platoon dug in around the cemetery and sent a detachment to occupy the church belfry as an observation post. From that vantage point, the observer enjoyed an unobstructed view of the network of roads and trails leading to the village from the west and southwest. While these defenses were being prepared, Major Johnston established his command post at the boys’ school. Throughout this digging-in process, more American paratroopers continued to arrive in Graignes, and by the end of the following day (D+1), the group had grown in size to 182 (12 officers and 170 enlisted men).

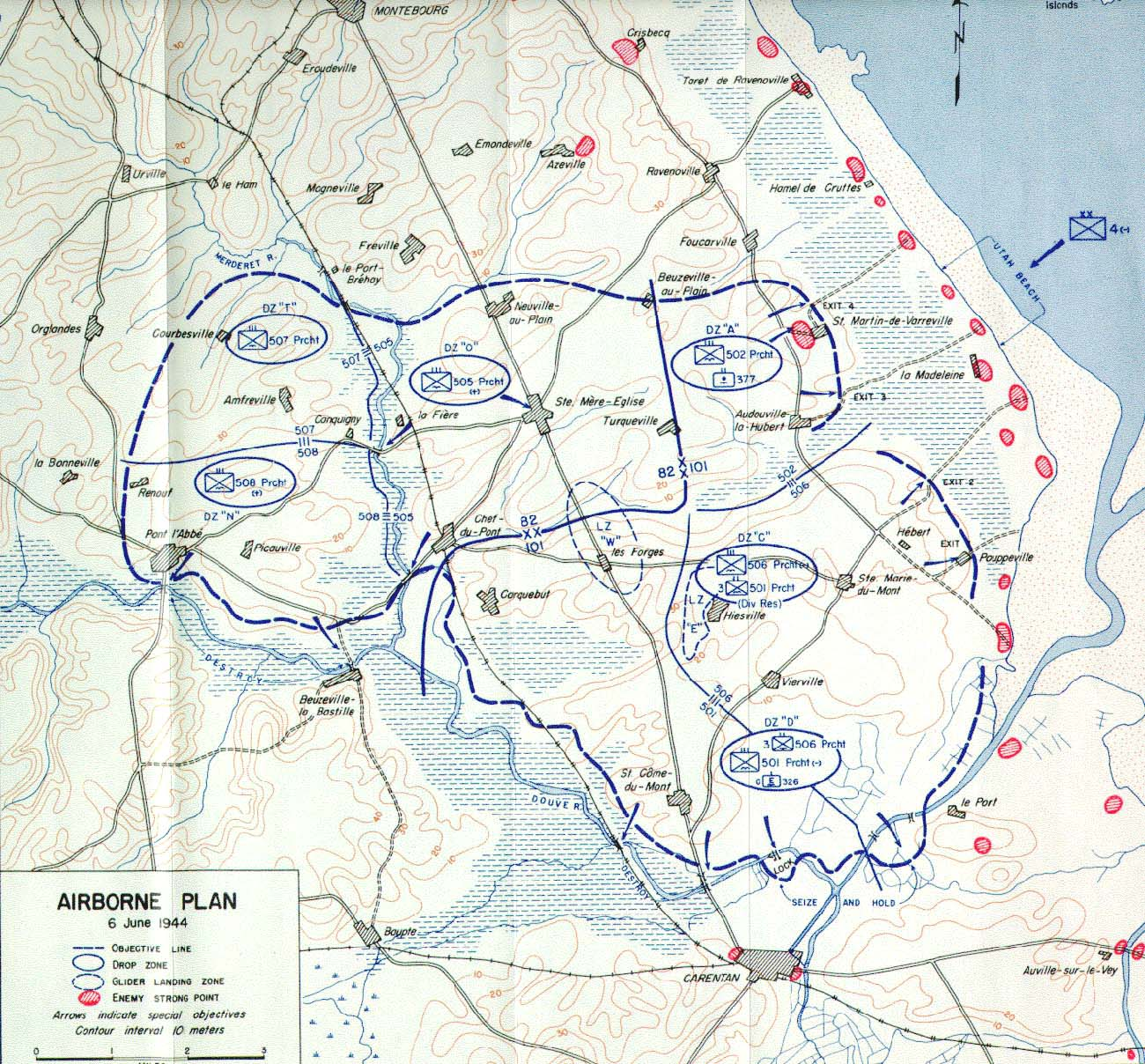
Planned airborne drop zones on the Cotentin Peninsula, D-Day, 6 June 1944

On the morning of 6 June, the village's mayor, M. (Monsieur) Mr. Alphonse Voydie, awoke to find American paratroopers in the field behind his house. He provided information and later called a town meeting to assess the supply situation. During that meeting, there was a unanimous decision to feed the paratroopers, despite the risks that came with helping the enemy. Under Mme (Madame) Mrs. Germaine Boursier's direction, the women of Graignes began cooking around the clock so they could serve two meals each day. Teams of men, women and even children were hauling wagon loads of valuable salvaged equipment back to the Graignes perimeter.

== Contact and assault ==
In the afternoon on Saturday, 10 June, a mechanized patrol approached a defensive position that was manned by some of First Lieutenant Murn's B Company, 1/501st Parachute Infantry Regiment men. They let the patrol get close, then opened fire, killing four. When the troopers searched a dead German's pockets, they discovered some documents that revealed him to be assigned to a reconnaissance battalion of an armored division.

On Sunday, there was no sign of the enemy and all was quiet that morning, so Major Johnston gave permission for some of the men to attend mass. However, halfway through the service, a woman burst into the church yelling, “The Germans are coming! Save yourselves!." The first assault, which lasted only ten minutes, had been an uncoordinated, piecemeal effort.

At about 1400 hours, the Germans commenced a punishing mortar bombardment of Graignes. This preparatory fire was swiftly followed by a second infantry assault against the flanks of the defensive line around the village. This time, the attackers moved so swiftly that the perimeter was almost breached at one point. However, Captain Brummitt quickly shifted forces to meet the threat, and the line held. Once again, the paratroopers’ supporting fire was decisive in holding off defeat as mortar fire inflicted heavy losses and scores of enemy infantry were caught in the crossfire of the multiple machine guns defending the village center.

In the evening, the guard posts could hear heavy vehicles move about. Since the observed evidence indicated that Graignes was about to be the target of a major attack, Major Johnston sent all of the civilians away. At about 1900 hours, two German 88 mm guns opened fire on Graignes from the heights of nearby Thieuville a few kilometers away. This quickly disorganized the Americans and killed Major Johnston. With the observation post in the belfry destroyed, it was no longer possible for the troopers to employ their mortars against the approaching enemy with any degree of effective accuracy.

By the time the Germans made the final thrust into Graignes that night, the defenders had been reduced to a few isolated pockets of resistance spread out around the village. In many cases, men were beginning to run out of ammunition. As that happened, the enemy was quick to exploit the situation by overrunning the outer perimeter and moving into the streets of the center of the village. With Major Johnston dead, command of the force at Graignes fell to Captain Brummitt. Brummitt proceeded to order the men to pair off and try to make it to either Carentan or Sainte-Mère-Église.

Elements of the 17th SS Panzergrenadier Division Götz von Berlichingen had conducted the final assault on Graignes. When the 17th attacked, it was with a regimental sized force of approximately 2,000 men. The odds were ten-to-one in the Germans’ favor.

== Waffen SS war crimes ==
At the end of the 11 June battle, the 17th SS entered the church and found Captain Abraham ‘Bud’ Sophian's aid station. Sophian (battalion surgeon and paratrooper) had surrendered the building to them by waving a white flag at the door. SS troops forced the Captain, his two medics and 14 wounded American paratroopers to line up against a wall. The captured Americans were by definition POWs and therefore should have been protected under the terms of the Geneva Convention of 1929, of which Germany was a signatory. In fact, the wounded Americans were divided into two groups and murdered. One group of five wounded was taken to the edge of a nearby pond, where SS troops bayoneted them and threw their bodies into the water. The other group of nine were forced to march at gunpoint, approximately four kilometers to the South, to a field near the village of Le Mesnil-Angot. After arriving at the field, the group were forced to dig a pit that would be their own graves and then kneel down. After the hole had been dug, the SS shot each of the wounded men through the head and pushed their bodies into the pit. At some point that same day, Captain Sophian and his two medics were also shot by the SS. Sophian's body was not recovered until the spring of 1945. Collectively, these 17 murders perpetrated by Waffen SS troops against defenseless prisoners of war constituted war crimes.

Other Germans began systematically rounding-up French civilians suspected of assisting U.S. troops. A total of forty-four villagers were rounded up, interrogated by the Germans as suspected collaborators with the Americans and were then shot dead. Other SS men dragged Father Leblastier and Father Lebarbanchon from the rectory into the courtyard outside, and shot them both dead. The Germans then discovered Madeleine Pezeril and eighty-year-old Eugénie Dujardin and shot them both dead in their beds. Thereafter, the SS men ransacked the village for any valuables they could steal.

On Tuesday 13 June, the Germans burned the village. They poured gasoline over the bodies of Father Leblastier, Father Lebarbanchon, Eugénie Dujardin and Madeleine Pezeril and then set them on fire. The ensuing blaze was allowed to burn out of control, destroying 66 homes, the boys’ school, Mme Boursier's café, and the 12th-century church. Another 159 homes and other buildings were damaged either as a result of that fire or the fighting. Before the 11 June battle and the German retaliation that followed, the village of Graignes had consisted of just over two hundred dispersed homes and other structures. Afterward, only two houses survived unscathed.

By then, most of the Graignes defenders had already left. Small groups arrived in Carentan late at night on the 12 June. Other troopers, some alone and some in pairs, continued to filter in on the 13 and 14 June. Twenty-one men hidden by the Rigault family and taken to Carentan by Joseph Folliot on the night of 15 to 16 June were the last from Graignes to make it back to U.S. lines. Out of the original 182 troopers involved in the defense of Graignes, 150 made it out alive.

== Aftermath ==
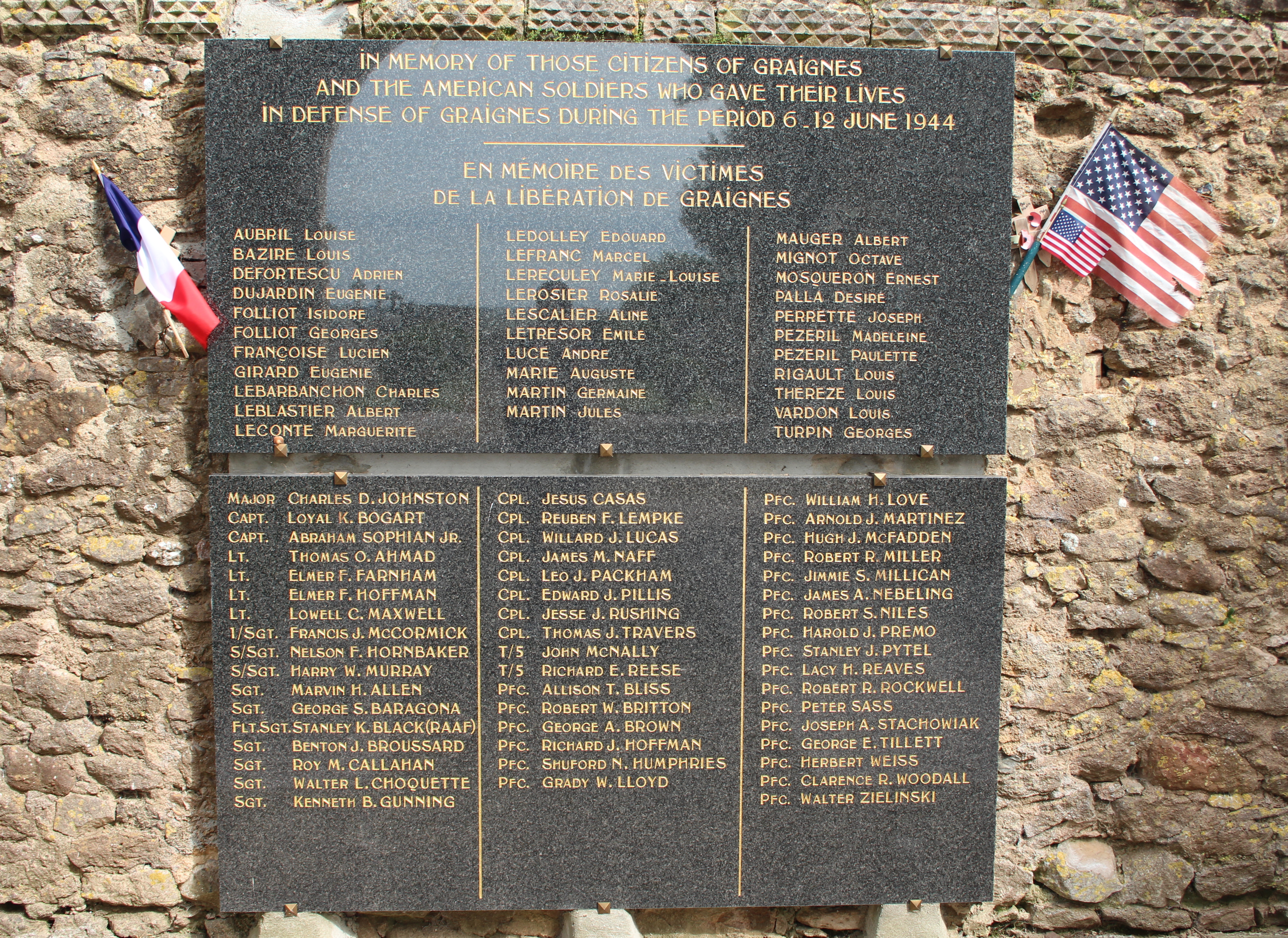
Memorial to citizens of Graignes and American soldiers

Had the mis-dropped paratroopers of the 507th not stopped dead the advance of the 17th SS Panzer Grenadiers this division could have made it to Carentan before the 101st Airborne Division.

The 507th remained in the fight in Normandy until 15 July when it returned to England. The regiment, later reassigned to the 17th Airborne Division, then went on to fight in the Battle of the Bulge and Operation Varsity – the airborne assault across the Rhine River. In September 1945, the 507th Parachute Infantry Regiment returned to the United States and was disbanded.

On 6 July 1986, a ceremony was held in the ruins of the 12th-century Roman Catholic church during which eleven villagers were presented with the Award for Distinguished Civilian Service for their role in assisting the men of 3/507th PIR. Six of those awards were posthumous.

== In popular culture ==
DC Vertigo Comics published a graphic novel about the Battle of Graignes called Six Days: The Incredible True Story of D-Day's Lost Chapter. Robert Venditti and Kevin Maurer wrote Six Days (Venditti's uncle died during the battle). Andrea Mutti drew the cover and interior art.
