= SS Panzergrenadier Brigade 49 =

- Active: 1944
- Disbanded: 8 September 1944
- Country: Nazi Germany
- Branch: Waffen-SS
- Type: Motorized Infantry
- Size: Brigade
- Engagements: Battle of France

SS Panzergrenadier Brigade 49 was a short-lived Waffen-SS unit formed in June 1944 from SS Kampfgruppen (Combat Groups) 1 and 2. Although designated as Panzergrenadier (mechanized infantry) the unit was only equipped with wheeled vehicles. The SS Main Office ordered it redesignated as the 26th SS Panzer Division on 10 August, but this was strictly notional. It played a minor role in the Battle of France before it was merged into the 37th SS Panzergrenadier-Regiment of the 17th SS Panzergrenadier Division Götz von Berlichingen on 8 August.

== Bibliography ==
- Tessin, Georg. Verbände und Truppen der deutschen Wehrmacht und Waffen-SS im Zweiten Weltkrieg 1939–1945; Band 5 - Die Landstreitkräfte 31–70 Frankfurt am Main: Verlag E. S. Mittler, 1976
