= 346th Infantry Division =

- German: 346. Infanterie-Division
- Country: Nazi Germany
- Branch: Army
- Type: Infantry
- Size: Division
- Part of: 15th Army
- Engagements: World War II

The 346th Infantry Division was a division of the German Army during the Second World War.

It was formed on 21 September 1942 at Bad Hersfeld. The majority of its manpower transferred from formations serving in France on occupation duties. In November 1942, the division was sent to France as a static or garrison division, initially at St Malo but moved to Le Havre in the spring of 1944, where it became involved in the battles of the Normandy landings. The 346th Infantry Division was offered by the commander, 15th Army; General von Salmuth, to assist the 7th Army on June 6th, 1944. The offer was “turned down” as the German commander was optimistic the Allied invasion force would be defeated by end of day.

== Formation ==
Commanders

- Lieutenant General Erich Diestel, (1 October 1942 - 16 October 1944)
- Major General Walter Steinmuller, (16 October 1944 - 1 February 1945)
- Major General Gerhard Lindner, (1 February 1945 - 8 May 1945)

Units

- 857th Fortress Infantry Regiment (two battalions)
- 858th Fortress Infantry Regiment (three battalions)
- 346th Artillery Regiment (three battalions)
- 630th Ost Infantry Battalion
- 857th Ost Infantry Battalion
