= Graignes-Mesnil-Angot =

- Commune
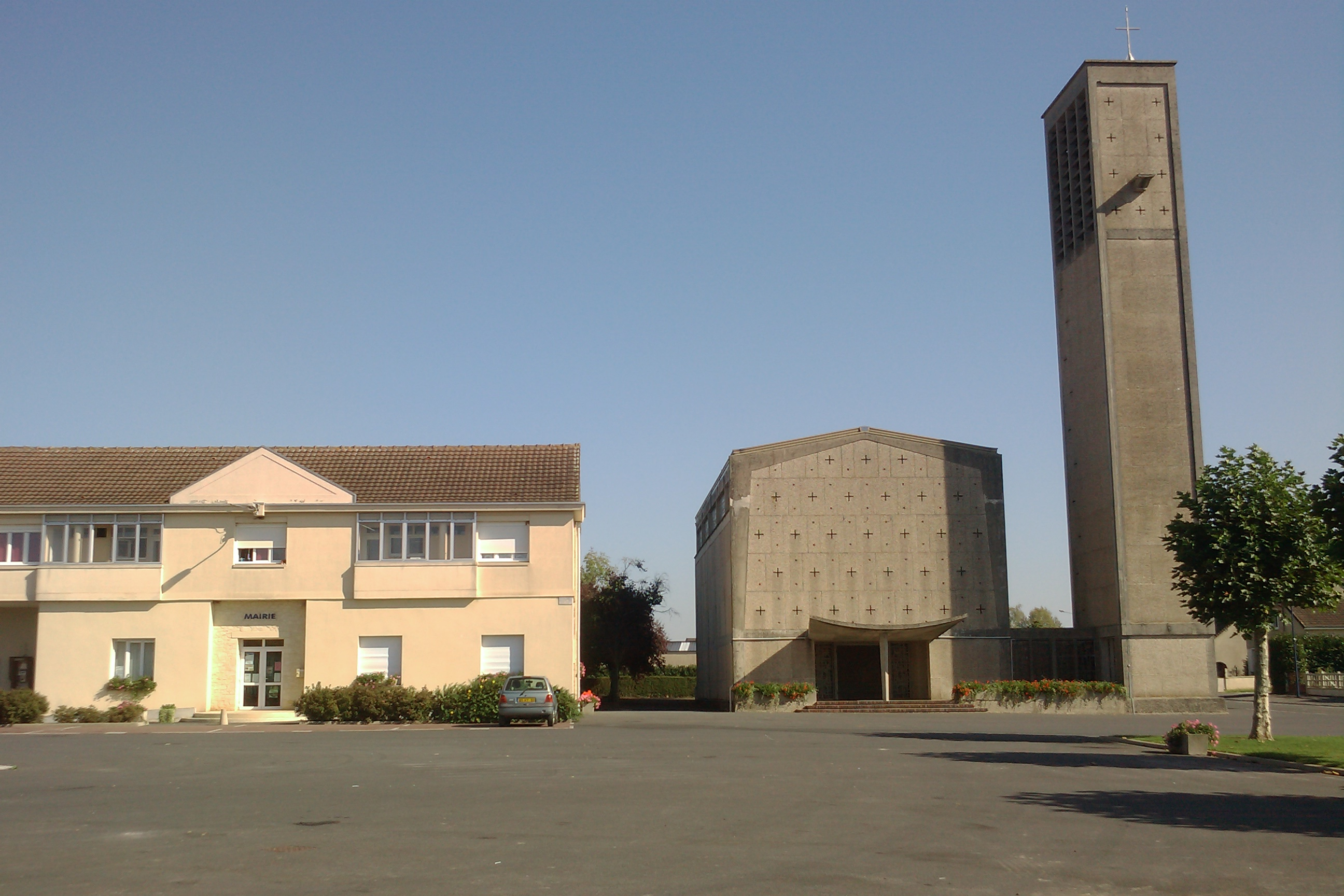
- The church of Saint-Michel and the town hall
- Location of Graignes-Mesnil-Angot
- Location within France Location within Normandy
- Coordinates: 49°14′21″N 1°12′01″W
- Country: France
- Region: Normandy
- Department: Manche
- Arrondissement: Saint-Lô
- Canton: Pont-Hébert
- Intercommunality: Saint-Lô Agglo

Government
  - Mayor (2020–2026): Jean-Pierre Guegan
- Area^{1}: 18.35 km^{2} (7.08 sq mi)
- Highest elevation: 37 m (121 ft)
- Lowest elevation: 0 m (0 ft)
- Population (2023): 797
  - Density: 43.4/km^{2} (112/sq mi)
- Time zone: UTC+01:00 (CET)
  - Summer (DST): UTC+02:00 (CEST)
- INSEE/Postal code: 50216 /50620
- ^{1} French Land Register data, which excludes lakes, ponds, glaciers > 1 km^{2} (0.386 sq mi or 247 acres) and river estuaries.

Graignes-Mesnil-Angot (French pronunciation: [ɡʁɛɲ mɛnil ɑ̃ɡo]) is a commune in the Manche department in north-western France.

It was formed on 28 February 2007 by the merger of Graignes and Le Mesnil-Angot.

== See also ==
- Communes of the Manche department
- Battle of Graignes
