= SS Panzergrenadier Brigade 51 =

- Active: 1944
- Disbanded: 8 September 1944
- Country: Nazi Germany
- Branch: Waffen-SS
- Type: Motorized Infantry
- Size: Brigade
- Engagements: Battle of France

SS Panzergrenadier Brigade 51 was a short-lived Waffen-SS unit formed in June 1944 from SS Kampfgruppen (Combat Group) 3. Although designated as panzergrenadier (mechanized infantry) the unit was only equipped with wheeled vehicles. The SS Main Office ordered it redesignated as the 27th SS Panzer Division on 10 August, but this was strictly notional. It played a minor role in the Battle of France before it was merged into the 38th SS Panzergrenadier-Regiment of the 17th SS Panzergrenadier Division Götz von Berlichingen on 8 August.

These units were specially formed as quick reaction forces that could be speedily deployed to any area in the West to repel Allied invasion attempts.

== War crimes ==
Soldiers from the Brigade 51 was responsible for the massacre in Buchères, France, 24 August 1944 when 68 civilians (68 people, of whom 10 children under ten year old, 5 elderly above seventy years, 35 women and three infants of 18, 11 and 6 months) were killed in a reprisal following an ambush by partisans against the unit.

It was also involved in several other atrocities against civilians in the Troyes area.

== Bibliography ==
- Crimes allemands : Le Martyre de Buchères (Aube) : 24 août 1944, Troyes : Grande impr. de Troyes, 1945, 48 p. *ÉGO 1939-1945 - Centre de Recherche d'Histoire Quantitative (CRHQ)/ par Françoise Passera
- Richard Landwehr, Alarm Units ! SS-Panzergrenadier Brigades 49 and 51, Merriam Press Siegrunen (Monograph Series), third edition 2012
- Tessin, Georg. Verbände und Truppen der deutschen Wehrmacht und Waffen-SS im Zweiten Weltkrieg 1939–1945; Band 5 - Die Landstreitkräfte 31–70 Frankfurt am Main: Verlag E. S. Mittler, 1976
- fr:Roger Bruge, 1944, le temps des massacres. Les crimes de la Gestapo et de la 51è brigade SS, Albin Michel, 1994

== Archives ==
- Gefechtsberichte der SS-Panzergrenadier-Brigade 49 und 51 // Bundesarchiv
