= 17th SS Panzergrenadier Division Götz von Berlichingen =

German armored division

17th SS Panzergrenadier Division "Götz von Berlichingen"
- 17. SS-Panzergrenadier-Division „Götz von Berlichingen“
- Divisional Emblem
- Active: 1943–45
- Country: Nazi Germany
- Branch: (Schutzstaffel) Waffen-SS
- Type: Panzergrenadier
- Size: Division
- Nickname: LMAA (Note: In reference to von Berlichingen's famous quote Er kann mich im Arsche lecken! ("He can lick my ass!"), simplified to Leck mich am Arsch ("Lick my ass").)
- Engagements: World War II; Western Front; Invasion of Normandy; Battle of Metz; Operation Nordwind; Battle of Heilbronn; Battle for Castle Itter

Commanders
- Notable commanders: Werner Ostendorff

The 17th SS Panzergrenadier Division "Götz von Berlichingen" (German: 17. SS-Panzergrenadier-Division "Götz von Berlichingen") was a German Waffen-SS division that saw action on the Western Front during World War II. It was formed in October 1943 from Germans, Volksdeutsche, Romanians, and Belgians, and included a cadre from the 10th SS Panzer Division Frundsberg. The division was sent into battle, destroyed, and rebuilt, before surrendering to U.S. forces near Achen Lake in May 1945. It was first stationed in southwest France before being sent to Normandy in June 1944, where it launched a counterattack against the U.S. 82nd and 101st Airborne Divisions. The 17th slowed down their advance but was practically destroyed as of July 1944. The division was rebuilt in eastern France and took part in the Battle of Metz, where it took heavy losses, and after that its remnants fought against the Western Allied invasion of Germany.

== Formation and training ==
The division was raised near Poitiers, France, as the Panzer-Grenadier-Division "Götz von Berlichingen" in October 1943. It was formed from scratch, with the majority of its original cadre coming from replacement units and conscripts, many of whom were Romanian Germans and French volunteers. After September 8, 1943, around five hundred Italian volunteers, coming from units deployed in France were enlisted in "Götz von Berlichingen". The division was granted the honour-title Götz von Berlichingen. (Note: The name referred to the 15th-century German knight who had, after losing his right hand in battle, worn an iron prosthetic hand. In keeping with this, the division's emblem was a clenched iron fist.) Obersturmbannführer Otto Binge oversaw the formation of the division, with the newly promoted Brigadeführer Werner Ostendorff taking command in January 1944. The Götz von Berlichingen was placed under the LXXX Army Corps, a part of Generalfeldmarschall Gerd von Rundstedt's Heeresgruppe D.

As part of a plan to number all named SS divisions in early 1944, the division was re-titled the 17th SS-Panzer-Grenadier-Division "Götz von Berlichingen". In February 1944, the division still lacked vehicles. During the same year, on the orders of LXXX Army Corps, the division began to round up French vehicles in an attempt to complete its mobilization. By March, most of the major combat formations were fully motorised, although two of the six infantry battalions were still on bicycles. On 1 June, the Götz von Berlichingen found itself at Thouars in France, with no tanks (although the crews were fully equipped with 42 Sturmgeschütz IV assault guns), only a few months' training, and below strength in officers and Non-commissioned officers.

== Battles for Normandy ==
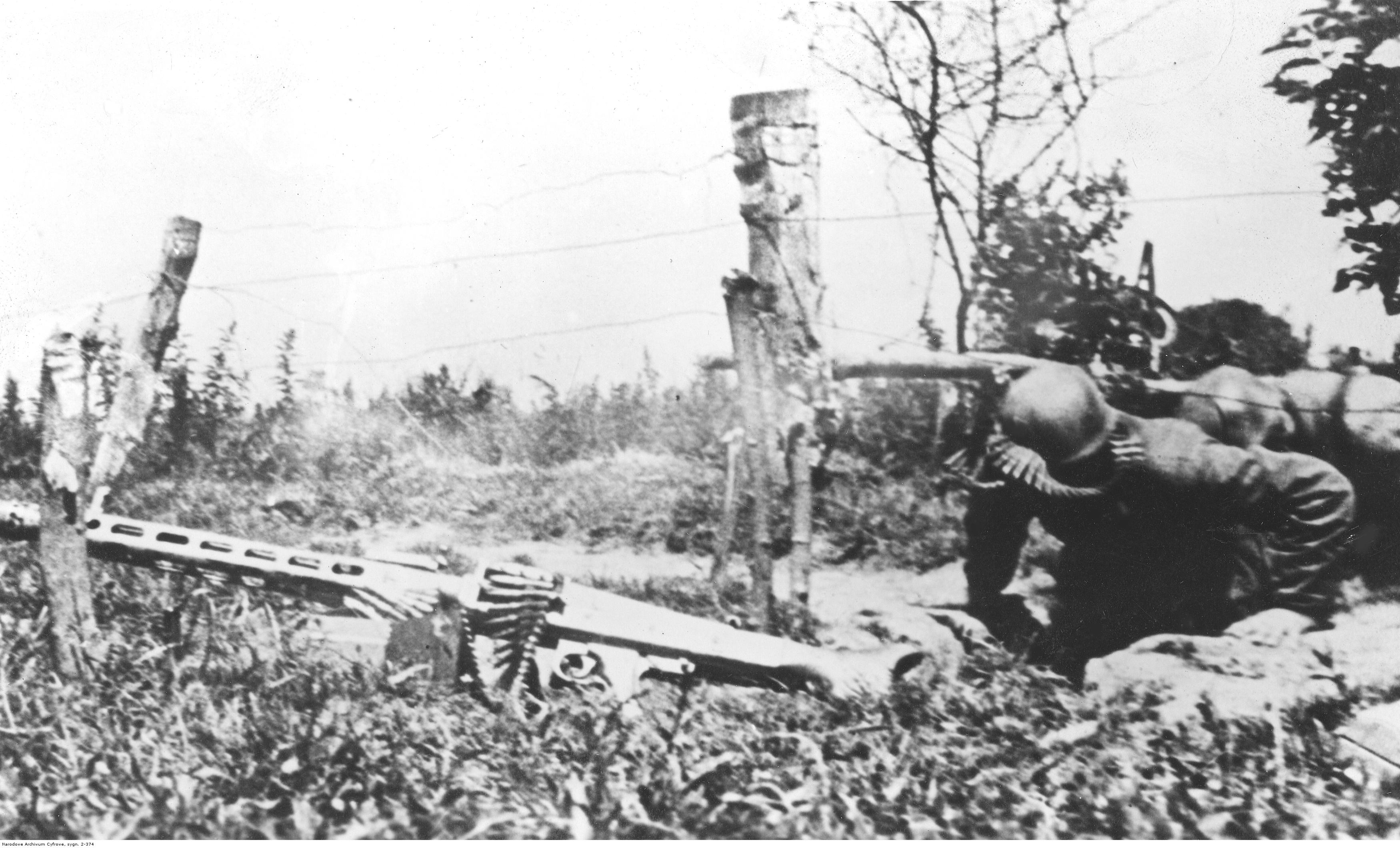
Soldier of the Götz von Berlichingen Division during the fighting in Normandy

After the Allied invasion of June 6, 1944, the Götz von Berlichingen was ordered to Normandy to take part in the efforts to reduce the Allied beachhead. On June 10 the division made contact with 182 paratroopers of the 3rd Battalion, 507th Parachute Infantry Regiment, part of the U.S. 82nd Airborne Division, and B Company, 501st Parachute Infantry Regiment, of the U.S. 101st Airborne Division, at the village of Graignes. This small group of paratroopers had been dropped mistakenly by the U.S. 9th Army Air Force Troop Carrier Command and had decided to try to hold their positions. The ensuing battle, and the criminal execution of wounded paratroopers and French civilians by the "Götz von Berlichingen", has since been known as the Battle of Graignes. On June 11 the reconnaissance battalion engaged in combat near the town of Carentan with the paratroopers of the 101st Airborne Division.

The Americans secured the town and were advancing south by the morning of June 13.

SS-Panzergrenadier Regiment 37, supported by the assault guns of the division's Panzer battalion and Oberst (colonel) Friedrich August Freiherr von der Heydte's 6th Fallschirmjäger Regiment, attacked the advancing American paratroopers. In what the Americans dubbed the Battle of Bloody Gulch, their attack was stopped by the arrival of Combat Command A of the U.S. 2nd Armored Division.

For the rest of the month, the division was engaged in heavy fighting for the bocage country near Saint Lô and Coutances. During this period, the Götz von Berlichingen suffered heavy losses and by the beginning of July, its strength was reduced to 8,500 men. The division was in the line of advance for Operation Cobra, and suffered heavy losses attempting to halt the Allied offensive. It was encircled by the U.S. 2nd Armored Division around Roncey where it lost most of its armored equipment. It was then ordered to take part in the Mortain Offensive, codenamed Operation Lüttich. After the failure of this offensive, the division was split into four Kampfgruppen, 'Braune', 'Gunter', 'Fick' and 'Wahl'. These small units managed to escape encirclement in the Falaise Pocket, but suffered heavy losses and remained in almost constant combat against the advancing Americans until the end of the month, when the division was transferred to Metz for a much-needed rest and refit.

In July the reserve battalion of the division was involved in counterinsurgency action against Operation Bulbasket in the Vienne Department.

== Retreat to Germany ==
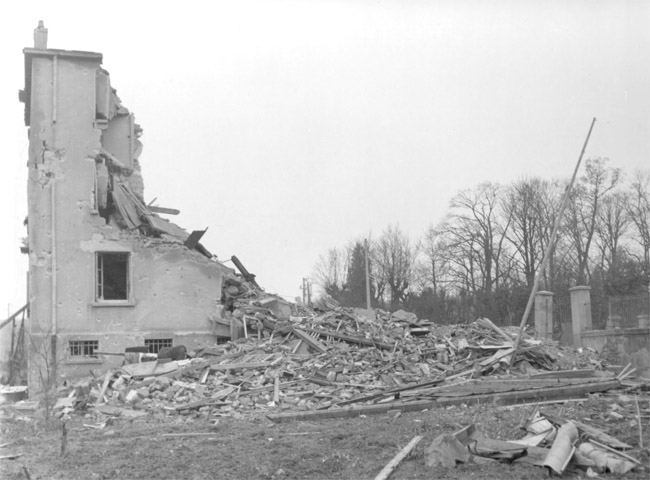
The 17th SS Division's headquarters after bombardment by the USAAF on November 8, 1944

In early September, the division absorbed what was left of the SS Panzergrenadier Brigade 49 and SS Panzergrenadier Brigade 51, raising its infantry strength. However, replacements for missing panzerjaeger and assault guns arrived slowly. On September 8, the division was put back into the line and was tasked with destroying the newly formed bridgehead over the Moselle River held by the US 5th and 80th Infantry Divisions. After heavy fighting for the American bridgeheads at Dornot and Arnaville, the division fell back and began to prepare to defend Metz itself.

Over the next two months, the division saw heavy fighting to the south and east of Metz, suffering very heavy casualties. On November 8, a USAAF air raid hit the divisional command post. With the Götz von Berlichingen's combat units in tatters (the 38th SS Regiment had been reduced to a strength of about 800 men by November 15, 1944) and with no command structure, Hitler authorized the division to withdraw from Metz. The 38th SS Regiment was largely destroyed at Metz and reformed in November with troops from the SS training regiment "Kurmark". The remnants of the division pulled back to the Maginot Line, near Faulquemont to rest and refit. During this time, the Götz von Berlichingen was transferred to SS-Gruppenführer Max Simon's XIII SS Corps. US forces liberated Metz on November 22, 1944.

Elements of the 38th SS Regiment defended Hilsprich against an advance of the American 35th Infantry Division on November 23. In the same defensive maneuver, the 38th Regiment succeeded in cutting up two American rifle companies that made an ill-advised attack against stronger German forces. Hilsprich fell to another, better supported, American attack the following day. During November 28/29, elements of the 17th SS Division successfully defended Farébersviller against an attack by the US 80th Infantry Division. By December 1, the SS division was deployed along a line extending from the Rosselle River to just south of Puttelange. The Götz von Berlichingen was caught by surprise when US forces attacked again on December 4, capturing both Farébersviller and Puttelange. Seriously weakened, the SS division fell back to Sarreguemines, which it defended for five days before the town's occupation by US forces on December 11, 1944.

The 17th SS Division subsequently retreated across the German border and went into a defensive posture along the Blies River. Attacks by the US 35th Infantry Division against this line started December 12, resulting in heavy fighting for the control of Habkirchen, (southeast of Frauenberg) and the high ground overlooking the valley of the Blies. The US 134th Infantry lost half its strength in this clash with the 17th SS Division, but captured Habkirchen by December 15. Under serious pressure because of infantry losses, the SS division was granted a reprieve when the Americans moved into a defensive posture on December 18. The Ardennes Offensive by Germany had begun to the north and US units from General George Patton's Third Army were ordered to either hold fast or move north to assist in the defense of the Ardennes.

== Refit and Nordwind ==
When the division pulled back to the Maginot Line in mid November, its strength had been reduced to around 4,000 men (of which about 1,700 were infantry) and 20 armored vehicles. Throughout the early days of December 1944, the Götz von Berlichingen received resupply and reinforcement. Although the armored strength was only 17 assault guns by December 10, a further 17 were sent from Germany on December 28. The Panzergrenadier regiments were brought up to full strength with the addition of Volksdeutsche replacements. The quality of these replacements was far below that of the division's original elements. Despite this, at least on paper, the division was back up to strength by the end of 1944.

As a part of Simon's XIII SS Corps, the division participated in Operation Nordwind, the ill-fated last German offensive in the West. The Götz von Berlichingen, together with 36th Volksgrenadier Division, attacked the US 44th and 100th Infantry Divisions around the town of Rimling. For this attack, the division had been reinforced with a Panther tank company from the 21st Panzer-Division, the 352nd and 353rd flame-thrower tank companies (equipped with Flammpanzer 38(t)s), and the 653rd Heavy Panzerjäger Battalion (equipped with Jagdtigers). The German attacks did not gain much ground, possibly because of the extreme weather conditions during the offensive. After engaging in heavy combat with the U.S. 7th Army, with little success and having the divisional commander replaced five times, the majority of the divisional staff was relieved on January 3. Replacements, in the form of Army officers, were received the next day. On January 10, the divisional commander, Standartenführer Hans Lingner, was captured by a patrol from the 114th Infantry Regiment, 44th Infantry Division, when his car overturned on the slippery roads. The driver was shot on the spot; Lingner, his aide-de-camp Untersturmführer Jund, and another of his staff were brought to the US lines where they were interrogated. Oberst Gerhard Lindner, one of the Army officers recently transferred to the division, took command on January 15. The division remained engaged with the divisions of the US XV Corps until Operation Nordwind ended on January 30, 1945.

== Defense of Germany ==
The Götz von Berlichingen took part in the defense of the 'West Wall' until March 18, 1945, when the Americans broke through. At this time its armored vehicle strength comprised 62 assault guns (of which 47 were operational) as well as two Panzer IV tanks. On March 22, division commander SS-Oberführer Fritz Klingenberg was killed in action. That day, the division abandoned all its vehicles and began to retreat, but only some 500 to 600 men escaped US encirclement in the Pfaelzer Forest and reached Wiesloch on the east bank of the Rhine.

By April 1, the division's strength was rebuilt to roughly 7,000 men. It then took part in the Battle of Buchhof and Stein am Kocher and the Battle of Heilbronn. Subsequently, the division defended the Jagst and Tauber River valleys, as well as Bad Mergentheim. Although greatly reduced in numbers, it took part in the defense of Nuremberg, where the 38th SS Regiment was destroyed by April 20. The rest of the division continued fighting until the 24th, and then fell back to Donauwörth on the Danube.

The last organized engagement fought by the division was on April 29, 1945, at Moosburg, Germany. It was there that the division's commander attempted to use Stalag VII-A, the largest POW camp in Germany, as a sort of hostage to buy time to escape across the Isar River. Their effort was frustrated when the commander of the 14th Armored Division learned of the plan, and ordered his Combat Command A to take Moosburg, capture the bridge across the Isar River, and most importantly, secure and protect the Allied Prisoners of War. The American infantry and tank force advanced to Moosburg, and without delay attacked the defensive positions of the 17th SS Panzergrenadier Division in front of the town. It fell following a brief, but ferocious battle. That same day the 14th Armored Division took over 7,000 German POWs, mostly SS.

On May 5, five days after Hitler's suicide, and three days before Nazi Germany's surrender, elements of the division attacked the 13th-century castle Itter Castle in Tyrol, Austria. Castle Itter (administratively a part of the Dachau concentration camp complex) was a prison for high-ranking French VIPs, the so-called Ehrenhäftlinge ("honor prisoners"), including politicians Paul Reynaud and Édouard Daladier, labor leader Léon Jouhaux, and former commanders-in-chief Maxime Weygand and Maurice Gamelin. The SS force wanted to execute all such prisoners. The attack was defeated by the 23rd Tank Battalion of the US 12th Armored Division under the command of Captain John C. 'Jack' Lee Jr., the former prisoners themselves, SS-Hauptsturmführer Kurt-Siegfried Schrader and anti-Nazi elements of the Wehrmacht under the command of Major Josef 'Sepp' Gangl, who died in the battle.

The remaining members of the division surrendered to the US 101st Airborne Division at Rottach-Egern, north of Kufstein, on May 6, 1945.

== War crimes ==
The following are individuals of the 17th SS Panzergrenadier Division Götz von Berlichingen who were accused and convicted of war crimes.

Erwin Schienkiewitz
Case Nr.: 11-18 (U.S. vs. Erwin Wilhelm Konrad Schienkiewitz) File Number: US0018
Review Date: 470404
Erwin Wilhelm Konrad Schienkiewitz, an SS officer of the 17th SS Panzer Grenadier Division 38th Regiment, was accused of participation in the execution of two American airmen out of a group of seventy. The airmen were being held as prisoners of war and were executed in retaliation for the death of German soldiers who had been killed a few days earlier. The event occurred within the boundaries of Montmartin-en-Graignes in France on June 17, 1944. Erwin Schienkiewitz was tried at The General Military Court at Dachau. In addition to the aforementioned war crimes the accused was also a member of an organization declared illegal by the International Military Tribunal. Schienkiewitz was found guilty and sentenced to life in prison.

Case Nr.111
Crime Category: Final Phase Crimes
Accused: Küster, Friedrich Erich 10 Years 3 Months
Court: LG Ellwangen 490120
OLG Stuttgart 490527
Country where the crime was committed: Germany
Crime Location: Ellwangen/Jagst
Crime Date: 4504
Victims: Prisoners, Civilians
Nationality: unknown, German
Agency: Waffen-SS SS-Bataillon 'Götz von Berlichingen'
Subject of the proceeding: Shooting of a number of foreign concentration camp prisoners, in part for trying to escape; mishandling of civilians, who had made derogatory remarks about Hitler, and demolition of the 'Josefinum' in Ellwangen

Case Nr.201
Crime Category: Final Phase Crimes
Accused: Ba., Nikolaus Acquittal, Bu., Heinz Acquittal
Court: LG Ellwangen 500316
Country where the crime was committed: Germany
Crime Location: Dalkingen
Crime Date: 450407
Victims: Prisoners
Nationality: unknown
Agency: Waffen-SS SS-Ersatz- und Ausbildungsbataillon 5 'Götz von Berlichingen'
Subject of the proceeding: Shooting of eight exhausted concentration camp prisoners, who, while being part of a prisoners' transport, had stayed behind at the railway station grounds of Ellwangen

Case Nr.251
Crime Category: Final Phase Crimes
Accused: B., Peter Acquittal, E., Theodor Acquittal, H., Heinz Acquittal
Court: LG Ellwangen 501025
Country where the crime was committed: Germany
Crime Location: Dalkingen
Crime Date: 450407
Victims: Prisoners
Nationality: German
Agency: Waffen-SS SS-Ersatz- und Ausbildungsbataillon 5 'Götz von Berlichingen'
Subject of the proceeding: Shooting of eight exhausted concentration camp prisoners, who, while being part of a prisoners' transport, had stayed behind at the railway station grounds of Ellwangen

Case Nr.466
Crime Category: Final Phase Crimes
Accused: M., Heinz Proceeding suspended
Court: LG Nürnberg-Fürth 581001
BGH 571022
Country where the crime was committed: Germany
Crime Location: Burgthann
Crime Date: 450417
Victims: Civilians
Nationality: German
Agency: Waffen-SS 17.SS-Panzergrenadier-Division 'Götz von Berlichingen'
Subject of the proceeding: Shooting of the mayor of Burgthann, who, summoned by the Americans, had ordered white flags to be hoisted in the town

Case Nr.315
Crime Category: Final Phase Crimes
Accused: H., Walter Acquittal
Court: LG Regensburg 520505
Country where the crime was committed: Germany
Crime Location: Dietfurt (Mittelfranken)
Crime Date: 450425
Victims: Jews
Nationality: German
Agency: Waffen-SS SS-Division 'Götz von Berlichingen'
Subject of the proceeding: Shooting of a Jewish dentist during the final days of the war

Case Nr.243
Crime Category: Final Phase Crimes
Accused: H., Walter 5 Years, M., Ludwig 3 Years
Court: LG Landshut 500924
Country where the crime was committed: Germany
Crime Location: Ebrantshausen, Holz (near Bad Wiessee)
Crime Date: 450428, 450502
Victims: Civilians, Prisoners
Nationality: German, unknown
Agency: Waffen-SS SS-Division 'Götz von Berlichingen'
Subject of the proceeding: Killing of a civilian, who had a white flag held available in order to hoist it at the church on the arrival of the Americans, as well as a summons to shoot concentration camp prisoners

The Götz von Berlichingen has also been accused of executing captured American paratroopers that were wounded as well as French civilians during the summer and autumn of 1944.

== Commanders ==
- SS-Standartenführer Otto Binge (October 1943 – January 1944)
- SS-Gruppenführer Werner Ostendorff (January 1944 – 15 June 1944)
- SS-Standartenführer Otto Binge (16 June 1944 – 18 June 1944)
- SS-Brigadeführer Otto Baum (18 June 1944 – 1 August 1944)
- SS-Standartenführer Otto Binge (1 August 1944 – 29 August 1944)
- SS-Oberführer Dr. Eduard Deisenhofer (30 August 1944 – September 1944)(MIA)
- SS-Standartenführer Thomas Müller (September 1944 – September 1944)
- SS-Standartenführer Gustav Mertsch (September 1944 – October 1944)
- SS-Gruppenführer Werner Ostendorff (21 October 1944 – 15 November 1944)
- SS-Standartenführer Hans Lingner (15 November 1944 – 9 January 1945) (POW)
- Oberst Gerhard Lindner (9 January 1945 – 21 January 1945)
- SS-Standartenführer Fritz Klingenberg (21 January 1945 – 22 March 1945)(KIA)
- SS-Obersturmbannführer Vinzenz Kaiser (22 March 1945 – 24 March 1945)
- SS-Standartenführer Jakob Fick (24 March 1945 – 27 March 1945)
- SS-Oberführer Georg Bochmann (27 March 1945 – 8 May 1945)

== Order of battle ==
- 37th SS-Panzergrenadier-Regiment
- 38th SS-Panzergrenadier-Regiment
- 17th SS-Panzer battalion
- 17th SS Artillery Regiment
- 17th SS-Panzerjäger battalion
- 17th SS-Sturmgeschütz battalion
- 17th SS Flak battalion
- 17th SS Signal Battalion
- 17th SS Panzer Reconnaissance Battalion
- 17th SS-Pionier battalion
- 17th SS-Divisions-Nachschubtruppen
- 17th SS-Panzer Instandsetzungs battalion (or maintenance battalion)
- 17th SS-Wirtschaft battalion
- 17th SS Medical Battalion

== See also ==
- List of Waffen-SS units
- List of German military units of World War II
