= Otto Binge =

German SS officer (1895-1982)

- Born: 19 May 1895
- Died: 18 June 1982 (aged 87)
- Military career
- Allegiance: Nazi Germany
- Branch: Waffen-SS
- Service years: 1914–1919; 1938–1945
- Rank: SS-Standartenführer
- Commands: SS Division Götz von Berlichingen; SS Polizei Division
- Conflicts: World War II

Otto Binge (19 May 1895 – 18 July 1982) was an SS-Standartenführer during World War II and a commander of the SS Division Götz von Berlichingen (June and August 1944) and the SS Polizei Division.

Military offices
Preceded by SS-Brigadeführer Fritz Schmedes	Commander of 4. SS-Polizei Division; 5 July 1943 – 19 August 1943	Succeeded by SS-Brigadeführer Fritz Freitag
Preceded by none	Commander of 17th SS Panzergrenadier Division Götz von Berlichingen; October 1943 – January 1944	Succeeded by SS-Gruppenführer Werner Ostendorff
Preceded by SS-Gruppenführer Werner Ostendorff	Commander of 17th SS Panzergrenadier Division Götz von Berlichingen; 16 June 1944 – 18 June 1944	Succeeded by SS-Brigadeführer Otto Baum
Preceded by SS-Brigadeführer Otto Baum	Commander of 17th SS Panzergrenadier Division Götz von Berlichingen; 1 August 1944 – 29 August 1944	Succeeded by Oberführer Dr. Eduard Deisenhofer
