= Fritz Klingenberg =

SS officer

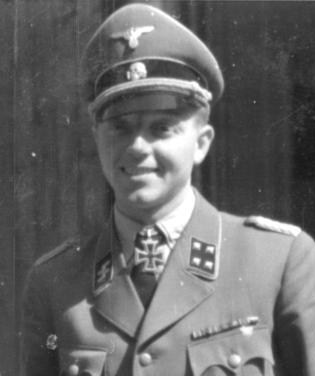
- Klingenberg in 1943
- Born: 17 December 1912; Rövershagen, German Empire
- Died: 23 March 1945 (aged 32); Herxheim, Nazi Germany
- Military career
- Allegiance: Nazi Germany
- Branch: Waffen-SS
- Service years: 1935–1945
- Rank: SS-Standartenführer
- Nickname: Ball Hunter
- Unit: SS Division Das Reich
- Commands: SS Division Götz von Berlichingen
- Conflicts: World War II
- Awards: Knight's Cross of the Iron Cross

Fritz Paul Heinrich Otto Klingenberg (17 December 1912 – 23 March 1945) was a German officer in the Waffen-SS who served with the SS Division Das Reich and was a commander of the SS Division Götz von Berlichingen. He was best known for his role in the capture of the Yugoslavian capital, Belgrade, for which he was awarded the Knight's Cross of the Iron Cross.

In April 1941, the German Army invaded Yugoslavia and then Greece. Klingenberg, a company commander in the Das Reich division, led his unit to the capital, Belgrade, where a small group in the vanguard accepted the surrender of the city on 13 April. A few days later, Yugoslavia surrendered.

== Capture of Belgrade ==
In April 1941, Klingenberg was with SS troops taking part in the invasion of Yugoslavia. Klingenberg disobeyed orders, and decided to reconnoiter Belgrade, with his units far ahead of the main German army. Finding a boat, he crossed the river, with the intention of ferrying a sizable force across; however, the boat sank, and he was left with just six men. Klingenberg then encountered some Yugoslav troops who had captured a drunken German tourist, and captured them.

On the 11th April, after a number of firefights the six Germans, having sustained no casualties but capturing a number of Yugoslav soldiers, made it to the centre of Belgrade with the tourist and their prisoners. There they raised a German flag. Jevrem Tomić, the Mayor of Belgrade, came out to meet them, after Klingenberg bluffed, telling him there was an incoming artillery barrage and an impending Luftwaffe attack. Tomić and some garrison troops surrendered the city to them on 12 April.

At this point a few more of Klingenberg's men arrived the same way he had, and made a show of their presence, pretending that there was more of them than there were. The German army eventually arrived, dumbfounded at the situation, having made a complex plan to take the city that was no longer needed, and was expected to cost thousands of lives. A few days later Yugoslavia surrendered. Klingenberg was awarded the Knight’s Cross for capturing the city, in effect capturing Belgrade with just himself, his six soldiers and the tourist.

== European theatre against US forces ==
On 21 December 1944, Fritz Klingenberg was promoted to SS-Standartenführer and two weeks later (on 12 January 1945) was appointed to command the SS Division Götz von Berlichingen. The division was attached to XIII SS Corps, defending southeast of Saarbrücken against the XV Corps of the Seventh United States Army. On 23 March 1945, Klingenberg was killed by a tank shell during a firefight on the western edge of Herxheim and is buried at the German War Cemetery in Andilly, France.

== Decorations ==
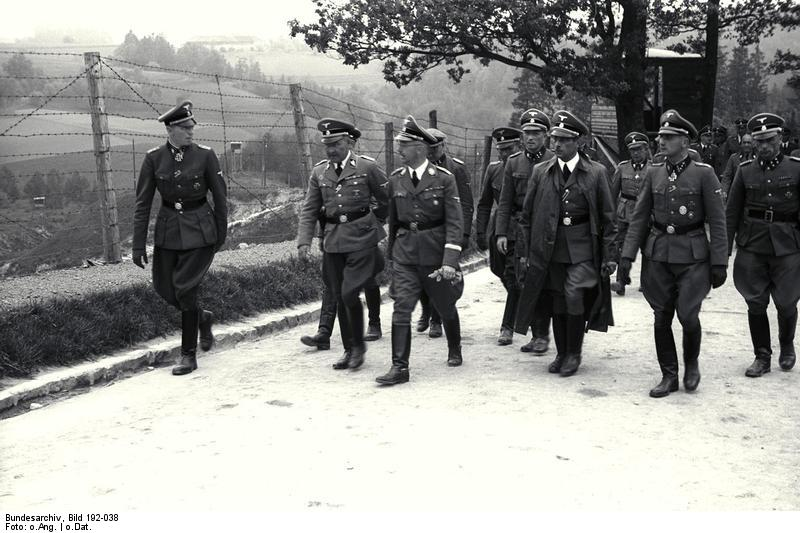
Klingenberg (far left) with Heinrich Himmler and other SS officers on tour of Mauthausen-Gusen concentration camp, June 1941.

- Knight's Cross of the Iron Cross on 14 May 1941 as SS-Hauptsturmführer and chief of the 2./SS-Kradschützen-Bataillon of the SS-Division "Reich".
- German Cross in Gold on 28 April 1944 as SS-Obersturmbannführer in the 2. SS-Panzer-Division "Das Reich"

== Sources ==
- Flaherty, T. H. (2004) [1988]. The Third Reich: The SS. Time-Life. ISBN 1-84447-073-3.
- Günther, Helmut (1991). Die Sturmflut und das Ende – Band 3, Mit dem Rücken zur Wand – Geschichte der 17.SS-Panzergrenadierdivision "Götz von Berlichingen". Schild Verlag. ISBN 3-88014-103-7.
- Patzwall, Klaus D.; Scherzer, Veit (2001). Das Deutsche Kreuz 1941 – 1945 Geschichte und Inhaber Band II [The German Cross 1941 – 1945 History and Recipients Volume 2] (in German). Norderstedt, Germany: Verlag Klaus D. Patzwall. ISBN 978-3-931533-45-8.
- Scherzer, Veit (2007). Die Ritterkreuzträger 1939–1945 Die Inhaber des Ritterkreuzes des Eisernen Kreuzes 1939 von Heer, Luftwaffe, Kriegsmarine, Waffen-SS, Volkssturm sowie mit Deutschland verbündeter Streitkräfte nach den Unterlagen des Bundesarchives [The Knight's Cross Bearers 1939–1945 The Holders of the Knight's Cross of the Iron Cross 1939 by Army, Air Force, Navy, Waffen-SS, Volkssturm and Allied Forces with Germany According to the Documents of the Federal Archives] (in German). Jena, Germany: Scherzers Militaer-Verlag. ISBN 978-3-938845-17-2.
- Weale, Adrian (2012). Army of Evil: A History of the SS. New York: Caliber Printing. ISBN 978-0-451-23791-0.
