= Andilly, Meurthe-et-Moselle =

Andilly
- Commune
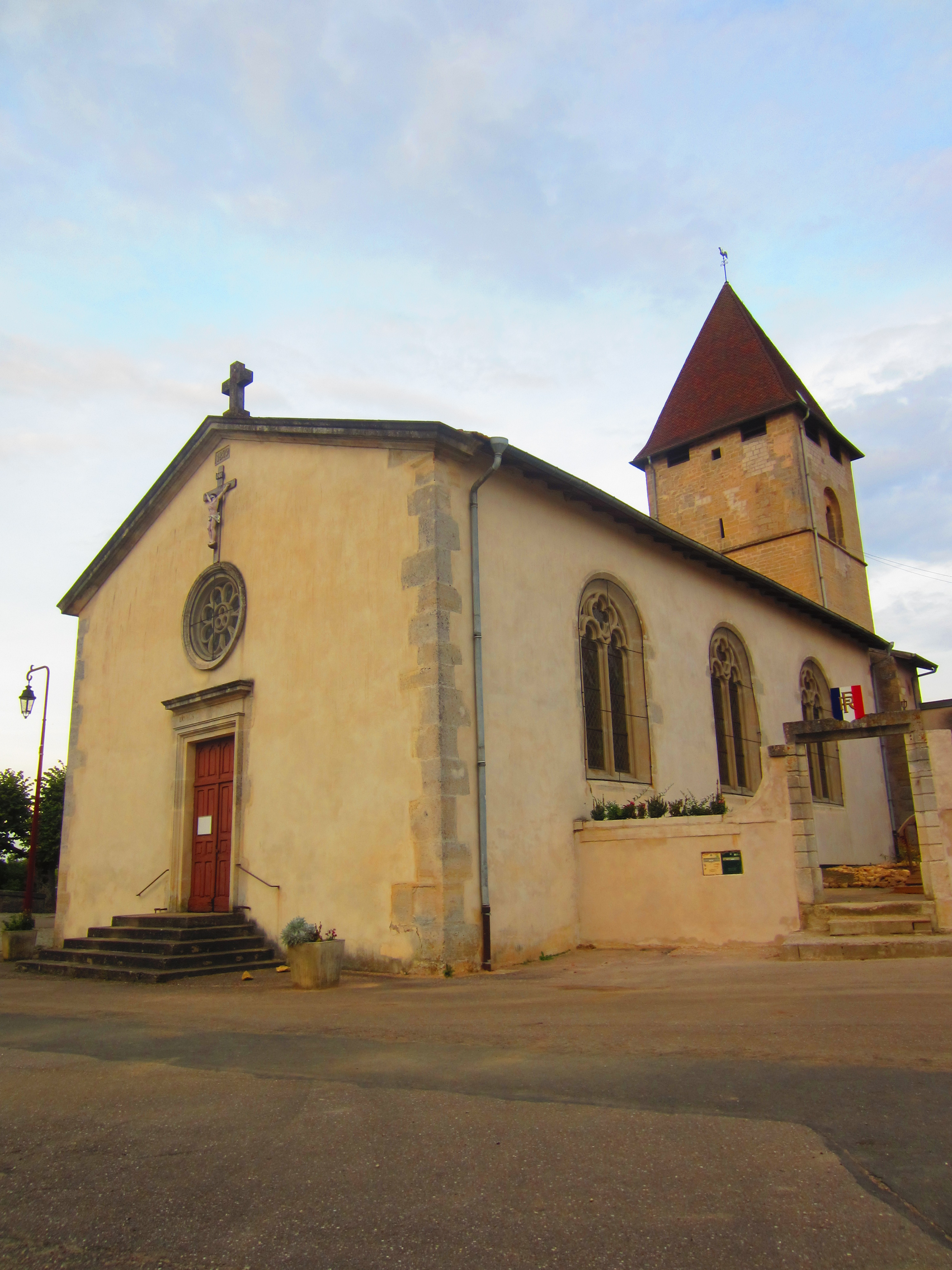
- The church in Andilly

- Coat of arms
- Location of Andilly
- Location within France Location within Grand Est
- Coordinates: 48°45′59″N 5°52′53″E
- Country: France
- Region: Grand Est
- Department: Meurthe-et-Moselle
- Arrondissement: Toul
- Canton: Le Nord-Toulois
- Intercommunality: Terres Touloises

Government
  - Mayor (2020–2026): Yvan Tardy
- Area^{1}: 7.12 km^{2} (2.75 sq mi)
- Elevation: 220 m (720 ft)
- Highest elevation: 254 m (833 ft)
- Lowest elevation: 213 m (699 ft)
- Population (2023): 275
  - Density: 38.6/km^{2} (100/sq mi)
- Time zone: UTC+01:00 (CET)
  - Summer (DST): UTC+02:00 (CEST)
- INSEE/Postal code: 54016 /54200
- ^{1} French Land Register data, which excludes lakes, ponds, glaciers > 1 km^{2} (0.386 sq mi or 247 acres) and river estuaries.

Andilly (French pronunciation: [ɑ̃diji]) is a commune in the Meurthe-et-Moselle department in northeastern France.

== Population ==
Historical population
Year	Pop.	±% p.a.
1968	202	—
1975	155	−3.71%
1982	190	+2.95%
1990	205	+0.95%
1999	218	+0.69%
2007	277	+3.04%
2012	286	+0.64%
2017	286	+0.00%
2023	275	−0.65%
Source: INSEE

== German war cemetery ==
The German War Cemetery Andilly ('Kriegsgräberstätte Andilly' in German), holding 33,123 German Second World War casualties, is the largest such WWII facility in France. First established on a provisional base in September 1944, it was officially inaugurated in 1962.

It contains the graves of:

- Fritz Klingenberg (1912-1945), Obersturmbannführer, Waffen SS

== See also ==
- Communes of the Meurthe-et-Moselle department
- Parc naturel régional de Lorraine
