= Graignes, Manche =

Commune in Basse-Normandie, France

Coordinates: 49°15′N 1°12′W

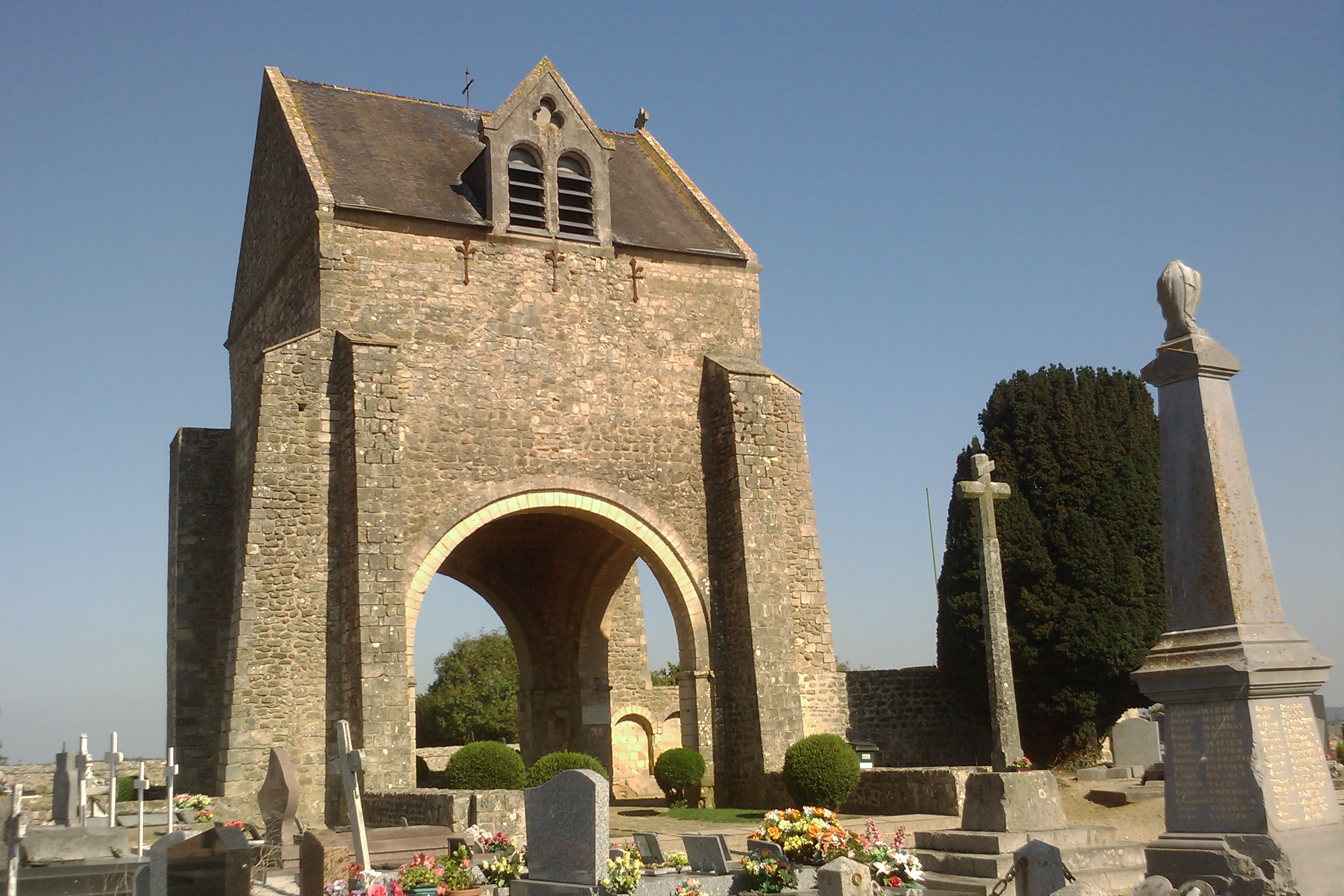
Franco-American memorial on the ruins of the church destroyed in WWII

Graignes (French pronunciation: [ɡʁɛɲ]) is a former commune in the Manche département of the Basse-Normandie region of Northern France. On 28 February 2007, it was merged with the commune of Le Mesnil-Angot to form Graignes-Mesnil-Angot.

== See also ==
- Battle of Graignes
