= XIII SS Army Corps =

- Active: August 1944 – May 1945
- Country: Germany
- Branch: Waffen-SS
- Size: Corps

The XIII SS Army Corps was formed in August 1944 at Breslau. It was moved to France and the Western Front. By the end of April 1945, some units of the corps operated in Czechoslovakia where they encountered the U.S. 97th Infantry Division. Others fought north of the Danube River near Regen.

== Commanders ==
- 1. August 1944 SS-Gruppenführer Hermann Priess
- 24 October with effect from 1 November 1944 SS-Gruppenführer Max Simon

== Order of battle ==
- 17th SS Panzergrenadier Division "Götz von Berlichingen"
- 38th SS Grenadier Division "Nibelungen"
- 113th SS Corps Intelligence Battalion
- 113th SS Corps Artillery Battalion
- 113th SS Kraftfahr Company
- 113th SS Military Police Troop
- SS Kampfgruppe Trümmler
