= Le Mesnil-Angot =

Coordinates: 49°13′N 1°12′W

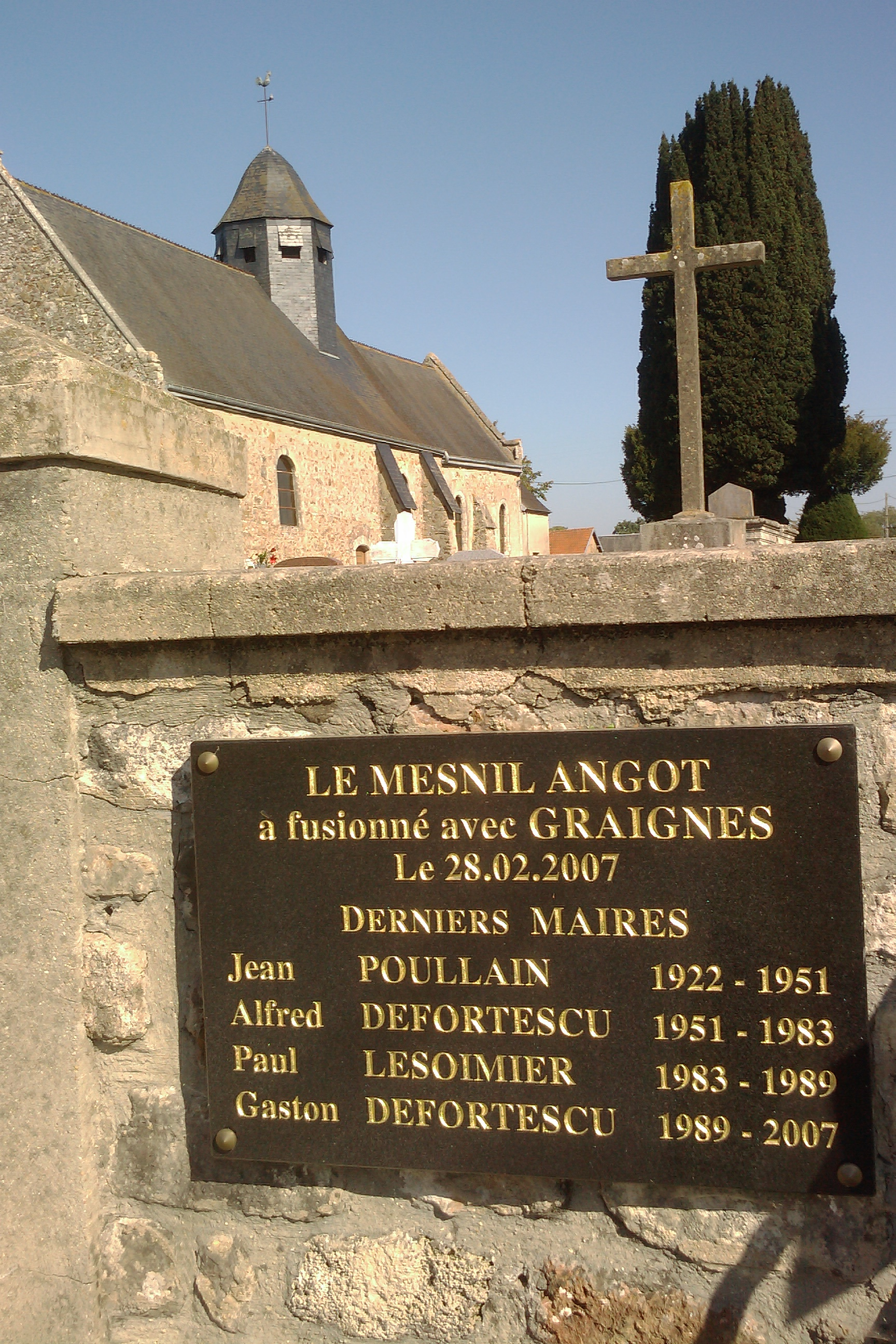
Le Mesnil-Angot

Le Mesnil-Angot (French pronunciation: [lə mɛnil ɑ̃ɡo]) is a former commune in the Manche department of the Normandy region of Northern France. On 28 February 2007, it was merged with the commune of Graignes to form Graignes-Mesnil-Angot.
