= Werner Ostendorff =

German SS general (1903-1945)

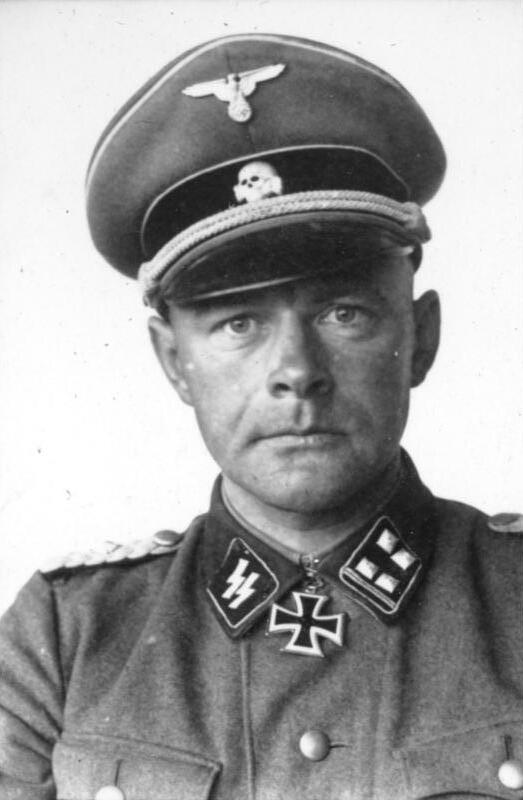
- Ostendorff in 1941
- Born: 15 August 1903; Königsberg, German Empire
- Died: 1 May 1945 (aged 41); Bad Aussee, Nazi Germany
- Military career
- Allegiance: Weimar Republic; Nazi Germany
- Branch: Waffen-SS
- Service years: 1925–1945
- Rank: SS-Gruppenführer und Generalleutnant der Waffen-SS
- Service number: NSDAP 4,691,488; SS 257,146
- Commands: SS Division Götz von Berlichingen; SS Division Das Reich
- Conflicts: World War II
- Awards: Knight's Cross of the Iron Cross with Oak Leaves

Werner Ostendorff (15 August 1903 – 1 May 1945) was a German SS-general during World War II who served as chief of staff of the II SS Panzer Corps and divisional commander of the SS Division Das Reich. He died of wounds in May 1945.

== SS service ==
NSDAP #: 4 691 488 - (Joined 1 May 1937)
SS #: 257 146 - (Joined, 1 October 1935)

Ostendorff joined the army in 1925. In 1933 and 1934, he helped form an SA military training school, and then transferred to the Luftwaffe. Moving to the SS-Verfügungstruppe (SS-VT) in 1935, he was an instructor at an SS school until April 1938. Ostendorff then transferred to the new SS-Standarte "Der Führer". With the forming of the first SS division on 10 October 1939, that became SS Division Das Reich, he was appointed divisional chief of staff and held the post until June 1942. Ostendorff was awarded the Knight's Cross of the Iron Cross on 13 September 1941 for leading a counter-attack against the village of Ushakovo in the vicinity of Smolensk which dominated the important Yelnya-Dorogobuzh road. The village was recaptured and the danger of a Soviet breakthrough was eliminated.

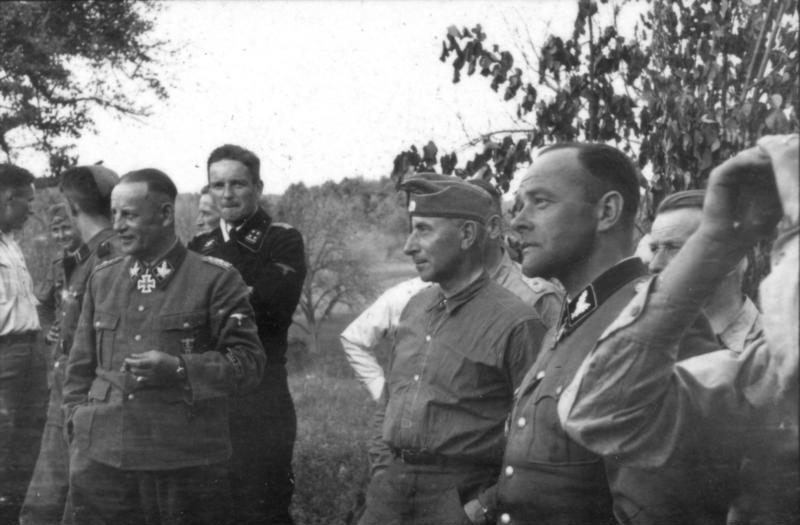
Krüger, Reitzenstein, Hausser and Ostendorff in the Soviet Union, 1943

Ostendorff led Kampfgruppe Das Reich on the Eastern front from February to June 1942, earning the German Cross in Gold. When Paul Hausser formed the initial SS corps in June 1942, he selected Ostendorff as his chief of staff. He held the post with SS-Generalkommando (later II SS Panzer Corps) until November 1943. Promoted to Oberführer for his actions at Kharkov, he was next given a divisional command. Ostendorff was assigned command of the SS Division Götz von Berlichingen, assuming command in January 1944. During the fighting in Normandy, Ostendorff was seriously wounded near Carentan on 16 June 1944. Resuming command on 21 October 1944, he remained the division's commander until transferred in late November 1944.

Ostendorff was promoted to Gruppenführer on 1 December 1944 and became chief of staff for Heinrich Himmler's Army Group Oberrhein from 2 December 1944 to 22 January 1945. His final posting was to SS Division Das Reich as divisional commander, assuming command on 10 February 1945, and led the division until seriously wounded on 9 March 1945 during the fighting in Hungary. Werner Ostendorff died at a field hospital in Bad Aussee on 1 May 1945.

== Personal life ==
Werner Ostendorff was a son of the Prussian Regierungsvizepräsident Ernst Ostendorff. Married in October 1935, he and his wife had two sons and a daughter.

== Decorations ==
- Iron Cross (1939), 2nd Class (19 May 1940) and 1st Class (23 June 1940)
- German Cross in Gold on 5 June 1942 as SS-Standartenführer in Kampfgruppe SS "Reich"
- Knight's Cross of the Iron Cross with Oak Leaves
  - Knight's Cross on 13 September 1941 as SS-Sturmbannführer and Ia (operations officer) of the SS-Division "Reich"
  - 861st Oak Leaves on 5 May 1945 as SS-Gruppenführer and Generalleutnant of the Waffen-SS and commander of the 2. SS-Panzer-Division "Das Reich" (Note: No evidence of the award to Werner Ostendorff can be found in the German Federal Archives. The award was unlawfully presented by SS-Oberstgruppenführer Sepp Dietrich. The date is taken from the announcement made by the 6. SS-Panzerarmee. The sequential number "861" was assigned by the Association of Knight's Cross Recipients (AKCR).)

== See also ==
- List SS-Gruppenführer

== Notes ==
Military offices
Preceded by SS-Standartenführer Otto Binge	Commander of 17th SS Panzergrenadier Division Götz von Berlichingen; January 1944 – 15 June 1944	Succeeded by SS-Standartenführer Otto Binge
Preceded by SS-Standartenführer Gustav Mertsch	Commander of SS Division Götz von Berlichingen; 21 October 1944 – 21 November 1944	Succeeded by SS-Standartenführer Hans Lingner
Preceded by SS-Standartenführer Karl Kreutz	Commander of SS Division Das Reich; 29 January 1945 – 9 March 1945	Succeeded by Standartenführer Rudolf Lehmann
