= Kommandostab Reichsführer-SS =

SS paramilitary unit controlled by Himmler

- Formation: May 1941
- Type: Waffen-SS
- Purpose: Nazi security warfare in the Army Group Rear Areas and civilian-administered territories (Reichskommissariat); Participation in the Holocaust
- Region served: Nazi Germany; German-occupied Europe
- Key people: Heinrich Himmler; Kurt Knoblauch

The Kommandostab Reichsführer-SS (lit. 'Command Staff Reich Leader-SS') was a paramilitary organisation within the Schutzstaffel (SS) of Nazi Germany under the personal control of Heinrich Himmler, the head of the SS. Established in 1941, prior to the German invasion of the Soviet Union, it consisted of the Waffen-SS security forces deployed in German-occupied territories. The units perpetrated mass murder against Jews and other civilians.

== Function ==
The organisation was formed on 7 April 1941 out of Waffen-SS troops as “special staff” (Einsatzstab), reporting directly to Reichsführer-SS Heinrich Himmler. It was officially designated as Kommandostab Reichsführer-SS on 6 May. To head the organisation, Himmler appointed a career army officer Kurt Knoblauch who acted as chief of staff for the units. The purpose of the formation was to conduct so-called “pacification operations” in the Army Group Rear Areas and occupied civilian-administered territories (Reichskommissariats).

Prior to the launch of the invasion of the Soviet Union in June 1941, the formations under the Kommandostab included two motorized SS Infantry Brigades (1st and 2nd) and two SS Cavalry Regiments combined into the SS Cavalry Brigade, totaling about 25,000 Waffen-SS troops. Its individual units were subordinated to local Higher SS and Police Leaders (HSSPFs) and used in the murder of Jews, political prisoners and other “undesirables”, in addition to providing rear area security. In the former function, the units activities were indistinguishable from the Einsatzgruppen mobile death squads and the Police Regiments, such as the Police Regiment Centre. Historian Yehoshua Büchler described the formations under the Kommandostab as “Himmler's personal murder brigades”.

== Subordinate formations ==
- SS Cavalry Brigade
- 1st SS Infantry Brigade
- 2nd SS Infantry Brigade
