= Hermann Fegelein =

German Nazi Waffen-SS commander (1906–1945)

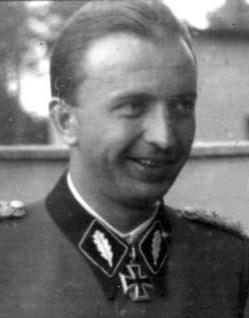
- Fegelein as an SS-Standartenführer (1942)
- Born: Hans Georg Otto Hermann Fegelein; 30 October 1906; Ansbach, Kingdom of Bavaria, German Empire
- Died: 28 April 1945 (aged 38); Berlin, Free State of Prussia, Nazi Germany
- Cause of death: Execution by shooting
- Spouse: Gretl Braun (m. 1944)
- Children: Eva Barbara Fegelein
- Relatives: Waldemar Fegelein (brother)
- Military career
- Allegiance: Weimar Republic (until 1933); Nazi Germany (from 1933 to 1945)
- Branch: Reichswehr; Waffen-SS
- Service years: 1925–1945
- Rank: SS-Gruppenführer und Generalleutnant der Waffen-SS
- Nickname: Flegelein ("little brat") (Note: Those close to Fegelein had nicknamed him "Flegelein" (O'Donnell 1978, p. 186). In German, one refers to someone as a Flegel (lout or brat) for lack of manners and appropriate behaviour. Flegelein is the hypocoristic form of a Flegel.)
- Service number: NSDAP #1,200,158; SS #66,680
- Commands: SS Cavalry Brigade; SS Cavalry Division Florian Geyer
- Known for: Pripyat Marshes massacres
- Conflicts: World War II
- Awards: Knight's Cross of the Iron Cross with Oak Leaves and Swords

Hans Otto Georg Hermann Fegelein (30 October 1906 – 28 April 1945) was a high-ranking commander in the Waffen-SS of Nazi Germany. He was Adolf Hitler's liaison officer to Heinrich Himmler and brother-in-law to Eva Braun through his marriage to her sister Gretl.

Fegelein joined a cavalry regiment of the Reichswehr in 1925 and transferred to the SS on 10 April 1933. He became a leader of an SS equestrian group, and was in charge of preparation for the equestrian events of the Berlin Olympic Games in 1936. He tried out for the Olympic equestrian team himself but was eliminated in the qualifying rounds.

In September 1939, after the invasion of Poland, Fegelein commanded the SS Totenkopf Reiterstandarte (Death's-Head Horse Regiment). They were garrisoned in Warsaw until December. In May and June 1940, he participated in the Battle of Belgium and France as a member of the SS-Verfügungstruppe (later renamed the Waffen-SS). For his service in these campaigns, he was awarded the Iron Cross 2nd Class on 15 December 1940. Units under his command on the Eastern Front in 1941 were responsible for the deaths of over 17,000 civilians during the Pripyat Marshes massacres in the Byelorussian SSR. As commander of the 8th SS Cavalry Division Florian Geyer in 1943, he was involved in operations against partisans as well as defensive operations against the Red Army, for which he was awarded the Close Combat Clasp in bronze.

After being seriously wounded in September 1943, Fegelein was reassigned by Heinrich Himmler to Hitler's headquarters staff as his liaison officer and representative of the SS. Fegelein was present at the failed attempt on Hitler's life on 20 July 1944. He was on duty at Hitler's Führerbunker in Berlin in the closing months of the war, and was shot for desertion on 28 April 1945, two days before Hitler and Eva Braun died by suicide. Historian Michael D. Miller describes Fegelein as an opportunist and careerist who ingratiated himself with Himmler, who granted him the best assignments and rapid promotions. Journalist William L. Shirer and historian Ian Kershaw characterise him as cynical and disreputable. Albert Speer called him "one of the most disgusting people in Hitler's circle".

== Career ==
Fegelein was born in Ansbach, Bavaria, to the retired Oberleutnant Hans Fegelein. As a boy working at his father's equestrian school in Munich, he became a proficient rider and participated in jumping events. During this period he met Christian Weber, an original member of the Nazi Party. Weber later sponsored Fegelein's entry into the Schutzstaffel (SS).

In 1925, after studying for two terms at the Ludwig-Maximilians-Universität München, Fegelein joined the Reiter-Regiment 17 (Cavalry Regiment 17). On 20 April 1927, he joined the Bavarian State Police in Munich as an officer cadet. In 1929 he left the police service when he was caught stealing examination solutions from a teaching superior's office. The official communication at the time was that he resigned for "family reasons". Fegelein later stated that he had left the police on "his own account" to better serve the Nazi Party and SS. His father had started the Reitinstitut Fegelein (Fegelein Riding Institute) in 1926. In Munich, Fegelein came into contact with Nazism and the SS. His father had made the institute available to the SS as a meeting place, and the training facilities and horses were used by equestrian units of the Sturmabteilung (SA) and SS.

Fegelein joined the Nazi Party (membership number 1,200,158) and the SA in 1930. He transferred to the SS on 10 April 1933, with membership number 66,680. He worked as an instructor at the Reitinstitut Fegelein and became the leader of the SS-Reitersturm, the SS equestrian group based at the facility. By the mid-1930s he took over administration of the school from his father. He was promoted to the Allgemeine-SS rank of SS-Untersturmführer that year and to SS-Obersturmführer on 20 April 1934 and to SS-Hauptsturmführer on 9 November 1934. Beginning in November 1935, Fegelein oversaw the preparation of the courses and facilities for the equestrian events of the Berlin Olympic Games. He was promoted to the rank of SS-Sturmbannführer on 30 January 1936. He tried out for the German equestrian team, but was unable to prevail against the strong competition from the Kavallerieschule Hannover (Hanover cavalry school), who went on to win all the equestrian gold medals.

Fegelein won the Deutsches Spring- und Dressurderby international tournament in 1937, as did his brother Waldemar, in 1939. He was promoted to the rank of SS-Obersturmbannführer on 30 January. On 25 July 1937, Reichsführer-SS Himmler, by special order of the SS-Oberabschnitt Süd, created the Haupt-Reitschule München (SS Main Riding School) in Munich. The school was started from his father's stud farm. Fegelein was named its commander and promoted to SS-Standartenführer the same day. Funding for the very expensive horses came in part from then SS-Brigadeführer Weber, who supported the school with more than 100,000 ℛ︁ℳ︁ annually. Fegelein won the "Braunes Band von Deutschland" (Brown Ribbon of Germany), an annual horse race which in 1938 was held on the premises of the riding school in Munich. Fegelein at the time had strong ambitions to participate in the 1940 Summer Olympics. With the help of his friend Höherer SS- und Polizeiführer (HSSPF; Higher SS and Police Leader) Karl von Eberstein, he arranged the transfer of all the Bavarian State Police horses to the SS riding school in case of mobilization. His fear was that the horses would be handed to the Wehrmacht.

=== World War II ===
In September 1939, Fegelein commanded the SS Totenkopf Reiterstandarte (Death's-Head Horse Regiment), which arrived in Poland shortly after the end of the Polish Campaign. The unit was placed under the command of the Ordnungspolizei (Orpo; order police) and was split into small groups assigned to support police activities at posts throughout the Poznań district. On 15 November, Himmler ordered the expansion of the regiment from four to thirteen squadrons and renamed it as 1. SS-Totenkopf-Reiterstandarte (1st Death's Head Cavalry Regiment). Additional men were recruited from ethnic Germans living in the General Government and further afield. As many of the officers, including Fegelein, had never attended officer training school, much of the training provided to new recruits was rudimentary. However, it was rigorous, and the men developed a strong camaraderie. Fegelein's unit was involved alongside the Orpo in the extermination, ordered by Hitler, of members of the Polish elite such as intellectuals, aristocrats, and clergy, in an action called Intelligenzaktion. On 7 December 1939, Fegelein's unit was involved in the mass shooting of 1,700 such people in the Kampinos Forest.

On 15 December, the unit was split into two Standarten (regiments), with Fegelein commanding the 1. Standarte under the overall command of Höherer SS- und Polizeiführer-Ost Friedrich-Wilhelm Krüger. The unit was short of basic supplies such as weapons, food, and uniforms, which led to deteriorating morale and ill health. Incidents of corruption and theft took place, particularly among members of the regimental staff in Warsaw. On 23 April 1941, Fegelein faced court-martial charges for an incident in 1940 where he and his unit had been caught stealing money and luxury goods for transportation back to Germany. Fegelein's court-martial was quashed by direct order of Himmler. The allegations brought forward against Fegelein had included "murder motivated by greed". Apparently he had ordered arrests and executions in the Gestapo prison in Warsaw. In addition to this, Fegelein was charged with having had an unlawful sexual relationship with a Polish woman. The woman had become pregnant and Fegelein forced her to have an abortion. Reinhard Heydrich tried several times to investigate the accusations against Fegelein, but each time Himmler quashed the attempt.

Fegelein's unit took part in anti-partisan fighting against a group of about 100 former Polish soldiers in the area of Kammienna–Konsky–Kielce in March and April 1940. They killed about half the partisans and the remainder escaped. On 8 April, Fegelein's unit killed 250 Polish men in villages in the area. While in his report he described the behaviour of his troops as "clean and decent", there were many incidents in this period where his men behaved in an undisciplined way, killing and robbing civilians without being ordered to do so.

In May and June 1940, Fegelein, who had been promoted to SS-Obersturmbannführer of the Reserves in the Waffen-SS on 1 March 1940, participated in the Battle of Belgium and France as a member of the SS-Verfügungstruppe. For his service in these campaigns, he was awarded the Iron Cross 2nd Class on 15 December 1940. In March 1941, the SS Totenkopf Reiterstandarte 1 was renamed to 1st SS Cavalry Regiment.

=== War against the Soviet Union ===
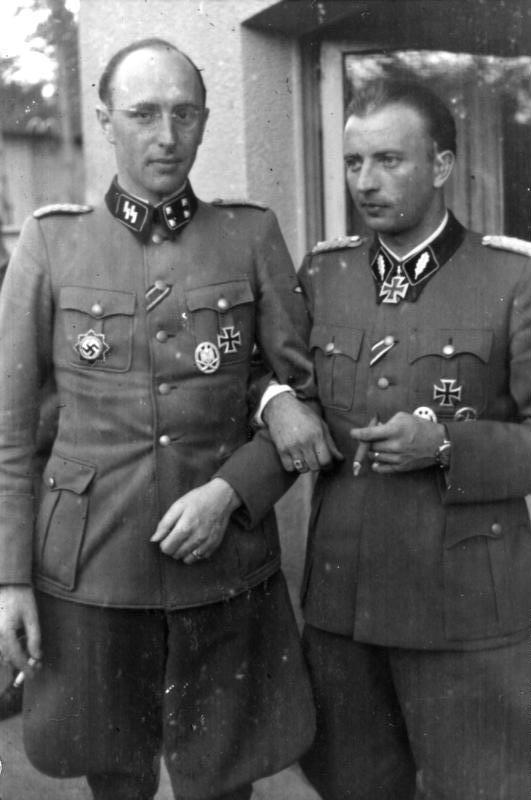
Fegelein (right) with Karl Gesele (1942)

With the start of the German invasion of the Soviet Union, which began on 22 June 1941, Fegelein saw active service on the Eastern Front. His unit was assigned on the 87th Infantry Division on 23 June to cover a gap in the lines of the 9th Army near Białystok. The motorized elements of the 1st SS Cavalry reached the right flank of the operational area on 24 June, but the mounted elements were unable to keep up. The exhausted horses had to be left behind and the men transported to the combat zone in lorries, while the horse-drawn artillery pieces were towed using any available vehicles. The first units to arrive crossed the Narew near Wizna and engaged the Soviets but were unable to break through. They were ordered to retreat and move further north. Infantry elements of the 87th Division captured Osowiec Fortress on 26 June, and Fegelein's cavalry was sent on a reconnaissance mission to the south-east. Himmler, unwilling to have his SS units under Wehrmacht control or used in combat other than as reserves, withdrew the SS cavalry from control of the 87th Division on 27 June. The ambitious Fegelein stressed in his reports that he believed his unit was combat ready and exaggerated its contribution to the operation. Ten of his men received the Iron Cross, Second Class for their efforts, and Fegelein was awarded the Iron Cross, First Class.

The engagement demonstrated the shortcomings of the cavalry units in modern mobile warfare, which requires quick redeployments in ever-changing conditions. Fegelein sought to improve this by asking Himmler to combine the 1st and 2nd SS cavalry regiments into a brigade, with additional support units. As a temporary measure, Himmler assigned Fegelein to be in charge of both regiments. Fegelein's unit was one of several that undertook field training and political indoctrination in the coming weeks. Himmler addressed the 1st Cavalry on 5 July, offering the opportunity for any men unwilling to participate in the upcoming "special tasks" to transfer to another unit. Nobody took advantage of this offer, at least partly because Himmler did not say that the upcoming assignment included the mass shooting of unarmed civilians.

On 19 July 1941, Himmler assigned Fegelein's regiments to the general command of HSSPF Erich von dem Bach-Zelewski for the "systematic combing" of the Pripyat swamps. The result was the Pripyat Marshes massacres, an operation designed to round up and exterminate Jews, partisans and civilians in that area of Byelorussian SSR. Himmler's orders for the operation were passed to Fegelein via SS-Brigadefuhrer Kurt Knoblauch, who met with him and Bach-Zelewski on 28 July in their new quarters at Liakhovichi in Byelorussia. General instructions were given to "cleanse" the area of partisans and Jewish collaborators. Jewish women and children were to be driven away. Fegelein interpreted these orders as follows: Enemy soldiers in uniform were to be taken prisoner, and those found out of uniform were to be shot. Jewish males, with the exception of a few skilled workers such as doctors and leather workers, would be shot. (Note: The historian Peter Longerich notes that most orders to carry out criminal activities such as the killing of civilians were vague, and couched in terminology that had a specific meaning for members of the regime. Leaders were given briefings about the need to be "severe" and "firm"; all Jews were to be viewed as potential enemies that had to be dealt with ruthlessly.) Fegelein split the territory to be covered into two sections divided by the Pripyat River, with the 1st Regiment taking the northern half and the 2nd Regiment the south. The regiments worked their way from east to west through their assigned territory, and filed daily reports on the number of people killed and taken prisoner. In a meeting with Bach-Zelewski on 31 July, Himmler announced the amalgamation of the two regiments into the SS Cavalry Brigade. Additional units such as a bicycle reconnaissance detachment were formed and added to the brigade's complement. On 5 August Himmler assigned leadership of the brigade to Fegelein.

Himmler notified Fegelein by telegram on 1 August that the numbers killed were far too low. A few days later, Himmler issued regimental order no. 42, which called for all male Jews over the age of 14 to be killed. The women and children were to be driven into the swamps and drowned. Thus Fegelein's units were among the first in the Holocaust to wipe out entire Jewish communities. As the water in the swamps was too shallow and some areas had no swamps, it proved impractical to drown the women and children, so they were shot. Fegelein's final report on the operation, dated 18 September 1941, states that they killed 14,178 Jews, 1,001 partisans, 699 Red Army soldiers, with 830 prisoners taken and losses of 17 dead, 36 wounded, and 3 missing. The historian Henning Pieper estimates the actual number of Jews killed was closer to 23,700.

Fegelein received the Infantry Assault Badge on 2 October. Four days later, he was again brought before a court for peculation of captured goods. Again the prosecution was halted by Himmler. In mid-October 1941, the brigade left Byelorussia and moved first to Toropets and then on to Rogachev by train, where they were subordinated to Army Group Centre. The new operational area had more partisan activity than the Pripyat swamps, with guerrillas who were well organised and difficult to find. Fegelein's report for the period between 18 October and 18 November 1941 shows 3,018 partisans and Red Army soldiers killed and 122 taken prisoner. However, as fewer than 200 weapons were captured, historians Martin Cüppers and Henning Pieper conclude that the majority of those killed must have been unarmed civilians. Brigade losses were seven dead and nine wounded.

Army Group Centre renewed their offensive on Moscow in mid-November. Fegelein and the SS Cavalry Brigade were held back as an operational reserve in the rearward area of the 9th Army. Massive counter-attacks by the Red Army led to a weakening of the entire German line, and the brigade was called in to fight at the front on 28 December. While Fegelein reported that his forces were the equivalent to one or two divisions, in reality he had only 4,428 men in total at this point, of which 1,800 were ready for action. The brigade was deployed at the south-eastern sector of the XXIII Army Corps, where it defended against attacks in the rearward area of the 206th Infantry Division in the Battles of Rzhev. The SS Cavalry Brigade took serious losses, with casualties of up to 60 per cent in some squadrons.

On 1 February 1942, Fegelein was promoted to SS-Standartenführer in the Waffen-SS and transferred from the reserve force to active service. Four days later, on 5 February, Fegelein on his own initiative led an attack on a strong enemy group northwest of Chertolino. The attack, carried out in difficult weather conditions, secured an important road junction and the railway station at Chertolino. In a nocturnal attack on 9 February, the brigade encircled and destroyed enemy forces at Chertolino, killing 1,800 Red Army soldiers. Yershovo was captured on 14 February, leading to the annihilation of the enemy units in Rzhevsky District. For his leadership in these battles, Fegelein was awarded the Knight's Cross of the Iron Cross on 2 March 1942. Fegelein was then granted home leave and was appointed Inspector of Cavalry and Transportation (Inspekteur des Reit- und Fahrwesens) in the SS-Führungshauptamt on 1 May 1942. In this position he was awarded the Eastern Front Medal and the War Merit Cross 2nd Class with Swords, both on 1 September 1942. The SS Cavalry Brigade was disbanded in March 1942 and the remaining men and equipment were formed into a battalion-strength unit called Kampfgruppe Zehender, commanded by SS-Sturmbannführer August Zehender.

Fegelein returned to the front line on 1 December 1942 and on the same day promoted to SS-Oberführer. He was given command of Kampfgruppe "Fegelein", based in the great bend of the Don. He was wounded in action by Soviet snipers on 21 and 22 December 1942.

On 20 April 1943, he was appointed commander of the 8th SS Cavalry Division Florian Geyer. Fegelein and his division were involved in operations against partisans in May to July 1943, which included Operation Weichsel, Operation Zeithen, and Operation Seydlitz. On 17 May, they annihilated a partisan group south west of Novoselki. He personally blew up a bunker in the attack. A week later, on 24 May, the division attacked another partisan strongpoint, and no prisoners were taken. During Weichsel (27 May – 10 June 1943) he reported the unit had killed 4,018 persons and deported 18,860, confiscated 21,000 cattle, and destroyed 61 villages southwest of Gomel. During Zeithen (13–16 June 1943) they destroyed a further 63 villages and (under direct orders from Hitler) killed all suspected partisans. During Seydlitz (26 June – 27 July 1943) he reported the destruction of 96 additional villages, with 5,016 killed and 9,166 deported and 19,941 cattle confiscated.

The division was then deployed in defensive operations against massed Soviet attacks. From 26 August to 15 September, the division repulsed five attacks of divisional strength and a further 85 attacks of battalion strength. The heaviest combat occurred on 26 August near Bespalovka and on 28 August, when the division halted a Soviet breakthrough at Bol'shaya Gomol'sha. Fegelein led a counterattack on 8 September, recapturing the height 199,0 at Verkhniy Bishkin. On 11 September 1943, during these defensive battles, he was awarded the Close Combat Clasp in bronze. Fegelein was severely wounded on 30 September 1943 and was hospitalised for a few weeks. He received the German Cross in gold on 1 November 1943. Following his convalescence he was appointed chief of Amt VI—Office for Rider and Driver Training—in the SS-Führungshauptamt on 1 January 1944.

At the same time, Himmler assigned him to Hitler's headquarters staff as his liaison officer and representative of the SS. He was promoted to the rank of SS-Gruppenführer und Generalleutnant der Waffen-SS on 10 June 1944. On 20 July 1944, Fegelein was present at the failed attempt on Hitler's life at the Wolf's Lair headquarters in Rastenburg, East Prussia and received a minor wound to his left thigh from the bomb blast. Fegelein often showed around the photographs of the hanged men who had been executed as a result of this failed assassination attempt.

=== Marriage ===
Fegelein's politically motivated marriage to Gretl Braun, Eva Braun's sister, took place on 3 June 1944 in Salzburg. Historian Kershaw and journalist Shirer believe he courted Braun as a way to advance his career. Hitler, Himmler, and Martin Bormann acted as witnesses at the ceremony. A two-day celebration was then held at Hitler's and Bormann's Obersalzberg mountain homes and the Eagle's Nest. Fegelein was a known playboy and had many extramarital affairs. Hitler's secretaries, Christa Schroeder and Traudl Junge, state Fegelein was popular socially, particularly with women. He could be funny and charming. Eva was glad to have someone in the entourage with whom she could dance and flirt, as Hitler was distant in social situations and refrained from publicly showing affection. Fegelein worked hard to develop a friendship with Hitler's powerful private secretary, Martin Bormann. Fegelein consistently attended Bormann's drinking parties and told Junge that the only things that mattered were "his career and a life full of fun."

== Death ==
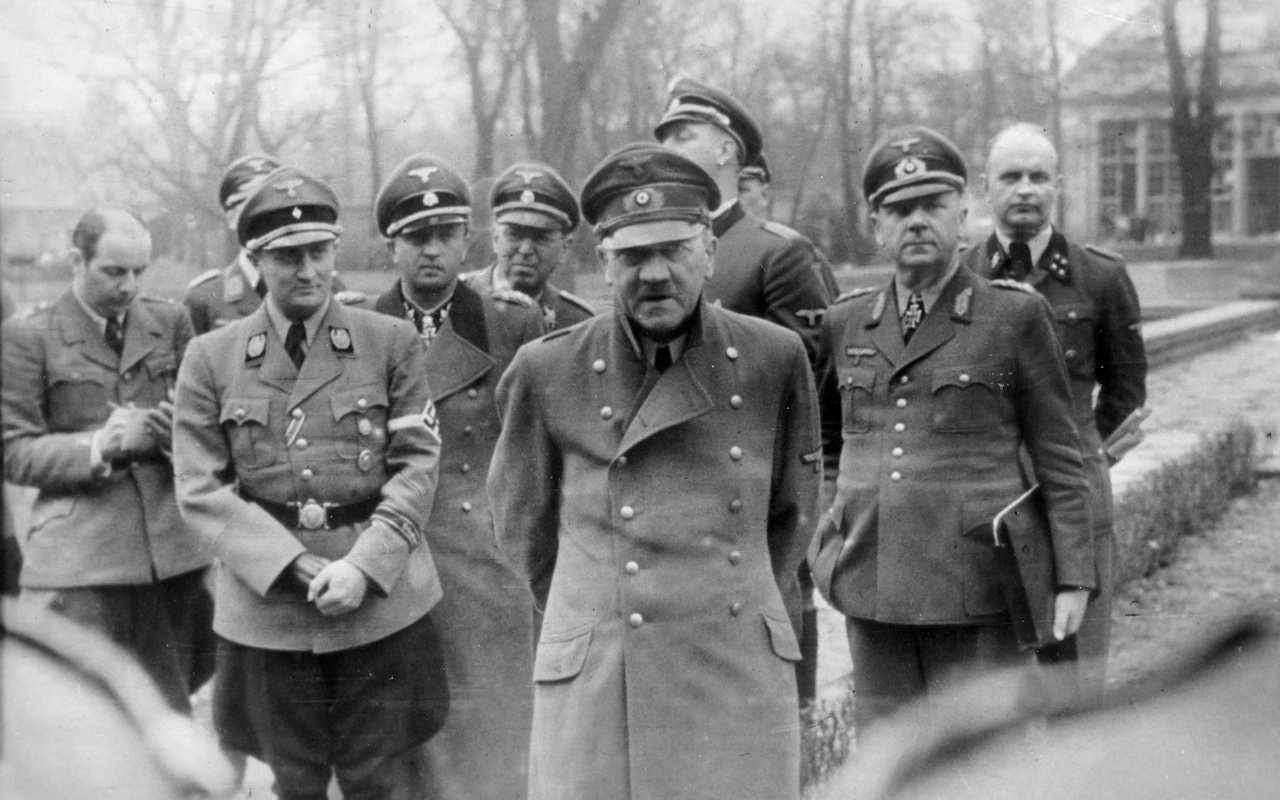
Fegelein (fourth from left) in 1945

By early 1945, Germany's military situation was on the verge of total collapse. Hitler, presiding over a rapidly disintegrating Third Reich, retreated to his Führerbunker in Berlin on 16 January 1945. To the Nazi leadership, it was clear that the Battle of Berlin would be the final battle of the war. Berlin was bombarded by Soviet artillery for the first time on 20 April 1945 (Hitler's birthday). By the evening of 21 April, Red Army tanks had reached the outskirts of the city. By 27 April, Berlin was cut off from the rest of Germany as the Soviet army encircled the city.

On 27 April 1945, Reichssicherheitsdienst (RSD) deputy commander SS-Obersturmbannführer Peter Högl was sent out from the Reich Chancellery to find Fegelein, who had abandoned his post at the Führerbunker after deciding he did not want to "join a suicide pact". Fegelein was located by the RSD squad in his Berlin apartment, wearing civilian clothes and preparing to flee to Sweden or Switzerland. He was carrying cash—German and foreign—and jewellery, some of which belonged to Braun. Högl found a briefcase containing documents with evidence of Himmler's attempted peace negotiations with the Western Allies. According to most accounts, Fegelein was intoxicated when arrested and taken back to the Führerbunker. He was kept in a makeshift cell until the evening of 28 April. That night, Hitler was informed of the BBC broadcast of a Reuters news report about Himmler's attempted negotiations with the western Allies via Count Folke Bernadotte. Hitler flew into a rage on this betrayal and ordered Himmler's arrest. Sensing a connection between Fegelein's disappearance and Himmler's betrayal, Hitler ordered SS-Gruppenführer Heinrich Müller to interrogate Fegelein as to what he knew of Himmler's plans. Thereafter, according to Otto Günsche (Hitler's personal adjutant), Hitler ordered that Fegelein be stripped of all rank and transferred to Kampfgruppe "Mohnke" to prove his loyalty in combat. Günsche and Bormann expressed their concern to Hitler that Fegelein would only desert again. Hitler then ordered Fegelein court-martialled. Fegelein's wife was then in the late stages of pregnancy (the baby was born on 5 May). Hitler considered releasing him without punishment or assigning him to Mohnke's troops. Junge—an eye-witness to bunker events—stated that Braun pleaded with Hitler to spare her brother-in-law and tried to justify Fegelein's actions. Junge said Fegelein was taken to the garden of the Reich Chancellery on 28 April, and was "shot like a dog". Rochus Misch, who was the last survivor from the Führerbunker, disputed aspects of this account in a 2007 interview with Der Spiegel. According to Misch, Hitler did not order Fegelein's execution, only his demotion. Misch claimed to know the identity of Fegelein's killer, but refused to reveal his name.

Journalist James P. O'Donnell, who conducted extensive interviews in the 1970s, provides one account of Fegelein's court martial. SS-Brigadeführer Wilhelm Mohnke, who presided over the court martial for desertion, told O'Donnell that Hitler ordered him to set up a tribunal. Mohnke arranged for a court martial panel, which consisted of generals Wilhelm Burgdorf, Hans Krebs, SS-Gruppenführer Johann Rattenhuber, and himself. Fegelein, still drunk, refused to accept that he had to answer to Hitler, and stated that he was responsible only to Himmler. Fegelein was so drunk that he was crying and vomiting; he was unable to stand up, and even urinated on the floor. Mohnke was in a quandary, as German military and civilian law both require a defendant to be of sound mind and to understand the charges against them. Although Mohnke was certain Fegelein was "guilty of flagrant desertion", it was the opinion of the judges that he was in no condition to stand trial, so Mohnke closed the proceedings and handed the defendant over to General Rattenhuber's security squad. Mohnke never saw Fegelein again.

An alternative scenario of Fegelein's death is based on the 1948/49 Soviet NKVD dossier on Hitler written for Joseph Stalin. The dossier is based on the interrogation reports of Günsche and Heinz Linge (Hitler's valet). This dossier differs in part from the accounts given by Mohnke and Rattenhuber. After the intoxicated Fegelein was arrested and taken back to the Führerbunker, Hitler at first ordered Fegelein to be transferred to Kampfgruppe "Mohnke", but Günsche and Bormann felt Fegelein would simply desert again. Hitler then ordered Fegelein to be demoted and court-martialled. At this point, the accounts differ, as the NKVD dossier states that Fegelein was court-martialled on the evening of 28 April by a court headed by Mohnke, SS-Obersturmbannführer Alfred Krause, and SS-Sturmbannführer Herbert Kaschula. Mohnke and his fellow officers sentenced Fegelein to death. That same evening, Fegelein was shot from behind by a member of the Sicherheitsdienst. Based on this stated chain of events, author Veit Scherzer concluded that Fegelein, according to German military law, was deprived of all honours and honorary signs and must therefore be considered a de facto but not de jure recipient of the Knight's Cross of the Iron Cross.

== Assessment ==
Journalist William L. Shirer and historian Ian Kershaw characterise Fegelein as cynical and disreputable; Albert Speer called him "one of the most disgusting people in Hitler's circle". Historian Michael D. Miller describes Fegelein as an opportunist who ingratiated himself with Himmler, who in return granted him the best assignments—mostly related to cavalry—and rapid promotion through the ranks. The historian Henning Pieper, who studied the period up until March 1942, notes Fegelein's lack of formal training as an officer led to deficiencies in the way the SS Cavalry Brigade was prepared for active service. Fegelein repeatedly overstated the combat readiness of his troops and exaggerated their accomplishments, in Pieper's opinion in order to be seen as a leader worthy of promotion and honours. Fegelein's faulty analysis of his brigade's readiness led to their use in December 1941 through March 1942 in combat situations for which they were unsuitable and untrained; however, as the military situation was deteriorating, they would eventually have received front-line assignments regardless of their readiness. By the end of March 1942, the brigade had suffered casualties of 50 per cent, much higher than army units deployed in the same area.

Fegelein's parents and his brother Waldemar survived the war. Gretl, who inherited some of Eva's valuable jewellery, also survived the war. She gave birth to a daughter (named Eva Barbara Fegelein, after her late aunt) on 5 May 1945. Eva Fegelein killed herself in April 1971 after her boyfriend died in a car accident. Gretl Braun-Fegelein moved to Munich and remarried in 1954. She died in 1987, aged 72.

== Awards and decorations ==
- Olympic Games Decoration (1st Class)
- German Equestrian Badge (gold)
- German Sports Badge (bronze)
- SA Sports Badge (bronze)
- Nazi Party Long Service Award (bronze)
- General Assault Badge (silver)
- Infantry Assault Badge (silver)
- Close Combat Clasp (silver)
- Wound Badge (silver)
- Wound Badge of 20 July 1944 (silver)
- Iron Cross (1939)
  - 2nd Class (15 December 1940)
  - 1st Class (28 June 1941)
- German Cross in Gold on 1 November 1943 as SS-Brigadeführer and Generalmajor of the Waffen-SS in the SS-Kavallerie-Division
- Knight's Cross of the Iron Cross with Oak Leaves and Swords
  - Knight's Cross on 2 March 1942 as SS-Standartenführer and commander of the SS-Kavallerie-Brigade
  - 157th Oak Leaves on 22 December 1942 as SS-Oberführer and commander of a Kampfgruppe
  - 83rd Swords on 30 July 1944 as SS-Gruppenführer and Generalleutnant of the Waffen-SS and commander of the 8. SS-Freiwilligen-Kavallerie-Division Florian Geyer

The death sentence on 28 April resulted in the loss of all orders, awards, and honorary signs.

== Dates of rank ==
Fegelein held various ranks in both the Allgemeine-SS and Waffen-SS. The following table shows that progression was not synchronous.

Date	Allgemeine-SS	Waffen-SS
12 June 1933:	SS-Untersturmführer	—
20 April 1934:	SS-Obersturmführer	—
9 November 1934:	SS-Hauptsturmführer	—
30 January 1936:	SS-Sturmbannführer	—
30 January 1937:	SS-Obersturmbannführer	—
25 July 1937:	SS-Standartenführer	—
1 March 1940:	—	SS-Obersturmbannführer of the Reserves
1 February 1942:	—	SS-Standartenführer
1 December 1942:	—	SS-Oberführer
1 May 1943:	—	SS-Brigadeführer and Generalmajor of the Waffen-SS
21 June 1944:	—	SS-Gruppenführer and Generalleutnant of the Waffen-SS

== See also ==
- List SS-Gruppenführer

Military offices
Preceded by none	Commander of SS-Kavallerie-Brigade; 5 August 1941 – 2 March 1942	Succeeded by SS-Brigadeführer Wilhelm Bittrich
Preceded by SS-Standartenführer der Reserve Gustav Lombard	Commander of 8. SS-Kavallerie-Division Florian Geyer; 20 April 1943 – 30 September 1943	Succeeded by SS-Standartenführer Bruno Streckenbach
Preceded by SS-Standartenführer Bruno Streckenbach	Commander of 8. SS-Kavallerie-Division Florian Geyer; 22 October 1943 – 1 January 1944	Succeeded by SS-Standartenführer Bruno Streckenbach
