= Franz Magill =

German riding instructor, SS officer and war criminal (1900–1972)

Franz Hermann Anton Magill
- Born: 22 August 1900
- Died: 14 April 1972 (aged 71)
- Occupations: Riding instructor SS officer
- Political party: Nazi Party

Franz Hermann Anton Magill (August 22, 1900 – April 14, 1972) was a German riding instructor, Schutzstaffel officer and war criminal of the Nazi era.

== Background ==
Franz Magill was the son of a day laborer. His father bought a small farm in Zuchen in 1908, where Magill graduated from elementary school. He was called up at the end of the First World War and after the end of the war in 1919 he became a volunteer (twelve donors) in the Hussar Regiment "Prince Blücher von Wahlstatt" (Pomeranian) No. 5 of the Reichswehr. In 1923 he was promoted to sergeant, and in 1928 to Wachtmeister. In 1929 he passed the riding instructor examination at the riding school in Belgard and, after leaving the Reichswehr, went to the private "German riding school" at Gut Düppel in Berlin as a qualified riding instructor.

After the National Socialists took power in 1933, Magill joined the SS and directed the riding instruction of an SS Reitersturms. In March 1935 he became a full-time SS leader riding instructor at the SS Junker School in Braunschweig and made a career there. At the end of 1935 he was promoted to SS-Hauptsturmführer and, after he joined the NSDAP in 1937 (membership number 4,137,171), to SS-Sturmbannführer on April 20, 1938.

Shortly after the attack on Poland, Magill received the order to set up SS cavalry squadrons in Gut Düppel and, in September 1939, in Lodsch in occupied Poland, then two months later in the Lublin district. There, the basis of the SS skull rider standards (two regiments) formed. In May 1940, Magill received an order from Hermann Fegelein to set up the 2nd SS-Totenkopf-Reiterstandard. Magill was not up to the task. In April 1941 he was recalled as leader of the 2nd regiment and commander of a cavalry division with four squadrons. The regimental leader of the 1st regiment was Hermann Fegelein and the 2nd regiment SS-Sturmbannführer was Heimo Hierthes (1897–1951). In the 1st regiment, Magill's position was held by SS-Sturmbannführer Gustav Lombard.

== Belarus ==
After the Germans invaded the Soviet Union, the two SS cavalry regiments systematically searched for Jews in the rear of Army Group Centre in Belarus, in order to shoot them. Magill's units operated east of Brest, towards Gomel. Several cities with larger Jewish communities were located in this area.

The mission began on July 30, 1941. On the morning of August 1, Fegelein instructed the squadrons of the 2nd regiment after a meeting with Himmler and Erich von dem Bach-Zelewski: “Express orders from the RF-SS. All Jews must be shot. Driving Jewish women into the swamps". In the days that followed, Magill's horsemen murdered thousands of Jews in and around Pinsk. On August 12, Magill reported shooting 6,450 Jews. Between August 11 and 13 alone, 2323 more victims were counted. Due to large gaps in the count, an even higher number can be assumed. Historian Martin Cüppers estimates the total number of Jewish victims was around 14,000, almost exclusively men and boys. In contrast to other SS units, Magill interpreted his orders narrowly and stated that the swamps were not deep enough to drown the women and children.

Magill was seconded to HSSPF Erich von dem Bach-Zelewski in September 1941 and deployed in the "fight against partisans". From December 28, 1942 to February 20, 1943, he was Oskar Dirlewanger's representative in the SS-Sonderkommando Dirlewanger, part of the Gottberg combat group. On April 20, 1943, he was promoted to SS-Obersturmbannführer and took command of the divisional supply troops of the 14th Waffen Grenadier Division of the SS.

== Trial ==
After the war ended in 1945, Magill was interned by British occupying forces until March 1948 because of his SS membership. Upon his denazification, he was sentenced to six months' imprisonment, which was considered to be already served because of his internment. He became a riding instructor at the riding and driving club in Cremlingen near Braunschweig. In November 1959, Magill was heard as a witness in an investigation against Erich von dem Bach-Zelewski. He reported frankly on the murder of the Pińsk Jews by his unit. The Nuremberg public prosecutor's office thereupon opened an investigation against members of the 2nd SS cavalry regiment, and handed it off to the Braunschweig public prosecutor's office in June 1960. On February 17, 1964, the trial against the primary defendants, Magill and his former commanders Walter Dunsch and Kurt Wegener, scout troop leader Hans-Walter Nenntwich and regimental adjutant Walter Bornscheuer, opened before the Braunschweig Regional Court. The nationwide sensational trial ended on April 20, 1964 with Magill convicted of aiding and abetting murder, in at least 5,254 cases and attempted murder in at least 100 cases, to five years in prison. Dunsch, Wegener and Nenntwich were also sentenced to five and four years in prison, respectively, and Bornscheuer was acquitted.

Despite further investigations into former leaders of the SS brigades, this remained the only trial against former members of the SS cavalry that resulted in a conviction.

== Sources ==
- Cüppers, Martin (2005). Wegbereiter der Shoah. Die Waffen-SS, der Kommandostab Reichsführer-SS und die Judenvernichtung 1939−1945. Darmstadt: Wissenschaftliche Buchgesellschaft.
- Klee, Ernst (2007). Das Personenlexikon zum Dritten Reich. p. 386. ISBN 978-3-10-039326-5.
- Sagel-Grande, Irene; Fuchs, H.H.; Rüter, C.F., eds. (1979). Justiz und NS-Verbrechen. Sammlung deutscher Strafurteile wegen nationalsozialistischer Tötungsverbrechen 1945–1966, Bd. XX. Amsterdam University Press. pp. 23–105. ISBN 9789060420201. "LG Braunschweig, 20 April 1964. No. 570. Subject matter of the proceedings: mass shooting of thousands of Jews in the Pripet area, including at least 4,500 Jews from the Pinsk ghetto"
