= 2nd SS Infantry Brigade =

Military unit of Nazi Germany

2 SS Infantry Brigade
- 2. SS-Infanterie-Brigade
- Active: 1941–1944
- Country: Nazi Germany
- Branch: Waffen-SS
- Type: Infantry
- Role: Rear security
- Size: Brigade

Commanders
- Notable commanders: Karl Fischer von Treuenfeld; Fritz von Scholz

The 2nd SS Infantry Brigade (mot.) (German: 2. SS-Infanterie-Brigade) was formed on the 15 May 1941, under the command of Karl Fischer von Treuenfeld with the 4th and 5th SS Infantry (formerly Totenkopf) Regiments and began its operational service in September in the Army Group North Rear Area, under which command it would spend its entire existence. It gradually began to incorporate foreign legions of the SS under its operational control. After the western legions departed for refit, it began operating with Latvian volunteer formations and eventually was redesignated the 2nd Latvian SS Infantry Brigade (Latvian: 2. Latviešu SS kājnieku brigāde) and on the 18 May 1943, and used as the cadre in the formation of the Waffen Grenadier Division of the SS (2nd Latvian) in January 1944.

== Operational history ==
The 2 SS Infantry Brigade was raised on 15 May 1941 and was placed under the command of Army Group North Rear Area for the invasion of the Soviet Union. Prior to this, the role that the unit would undertake during the assault was discussed in a meeting between Henning von Tresckow and Kurt Knoblauch of the RFSS office, held just three days before hostilities between Germany and the Soviet Union began. In this meeting it was decided that the 2 SS Infantry Brigade along with the 1 SS Infantry Brigade and the SS Cavalry Brigade would be used in the rear of the advancing army to conduct rear-security operations as well as assisting in rounding up the Jewish population. A few weeks later they took part in the mass murder of the population of the occupied territories, their victims for 1941 could be measured in the tens of thousands.

In 1942, the 19th and 21st Latvian Security Battalions from the Latvian Legion were attached to the Brigade. The brigade now included Dutch, Flemish and Norwegian volunteer legions. In January 1943, the 19th and 21st Latvian Police Battalions were serving with the brigade; Heinrich Himmler changed the 2 SS Infantry Brigade into a Latvian Brigade and at the same time set the foundations for a Latvian division. The existing 18th, 24th, and 26th Latvian Police Battalions were used to form the Brigade's 2nd SS Volunteer Regiment. They were then sent for training at Krasnoye Selo, where Himmler added the 16th Latvian Police Battalion to the brigade in February.

On 18 May 1943, these Latvian Battalions along with the other three Latvian Legion battalions were incorporated into the 2 SS Infantry Brigade, and re-designated the 2 SS Latvian Brigade. The Dutch, Flemish and Norwegian formations were then removed from the brigade and the 2 SS Latvian Brigade was deployed with Army Group North Rear Area.

In January 1944, the Brigade was used as the cadre in the formation of the 19th Waffen Grenadier Division of the SS (2nd Latvian).

== Citations and references ==
=== Cited sources ===
- Heer, Hannes & Naumann, Klaus. (2000). War of Extermination: The German Military in World War II, 1941–1944. Berghahn Books. ISBN 1-57181-232-6.
- Jurado, Carlos Caballero; Pavlović, Nigel; Thomas, Darko (2002). Germany's Eastern Front allies (2): Baltic forces. Osprey Publishing. ISBN 1-84176-193-1.
- Lumans, Valdis O. (2006). Latvia in World War II. Published by Fordham Univ Press. ISBN 0-8232-2627-1.
- Tessin, Georg (1965). Verbände und Truppen der deutschen Wehrmacht und Waffen-SS im Zweiten Weltkrieg 1939-1945; Zweiter Band: Die Landstreitkräfte 1-5 [Units and Troops of the German Wehrmacht and Waffen-SS in World War II 1939-1945; Volume Two: The Land Forces 1-5] (in German). Frankfurt am Main: E.S. Mittler. OCLC 3757861.
