= Pripyat Marshes massacres =

1941 Nazi massacres of civilians in Byelorussia and Ukraine, Soviet Union

- Part of the Holocaust
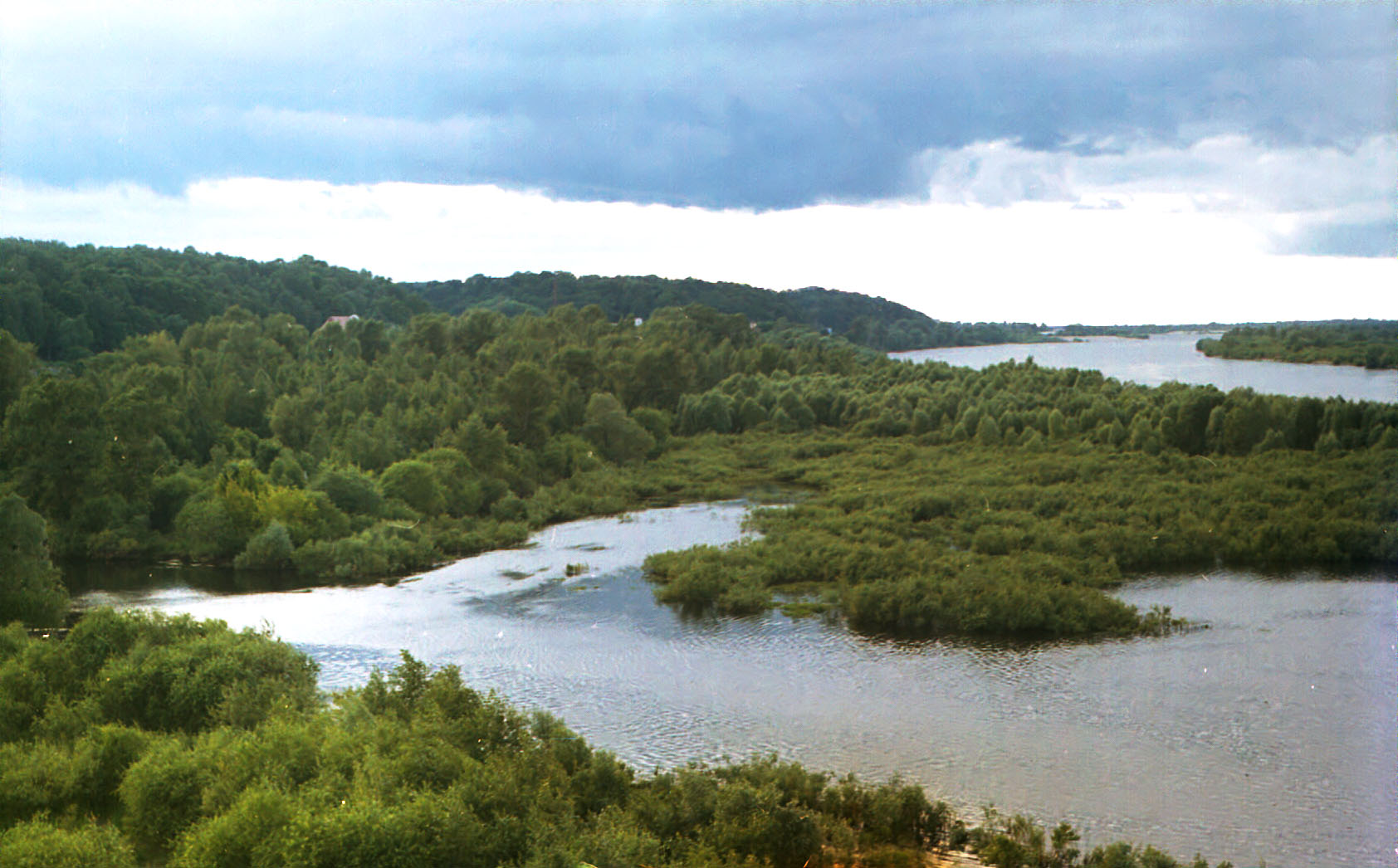
- The Pinsk Marshes (also called the Pripyat Marshes), the location of the massacres
- Date: 28 July – 29 August 1941 (or 31 August)
- Location: Pinsk Marshes, Byelorussian and Ukrainian Soviet Socialist Republics, Soviet Union
- Motive: Nazism
- Target: Soviet civilians (particularly Jews)
- Perpetrators: SS Cavalry Brigade; 162nd Infantry Division; 252nd Infantry Division
- Deaths: 13,788 (phase one); 3,500 (phase two)
- Property damage: Multiple villages completely destroyed Turaw partially damaged

The Pripyat Marshes massacres (German: Prypyatsümpfe Säuberung) were a series of mass murders carried out by the military forces of Nazi Germany against Jewish civilians in Belarus and Ukraine, during July–August 1941. SS leader Heinrich Himmler ordered these operations, which were carried out by units of the Wehrmacht (the regular armed forces) and the Waffen-SS. These units were ordered to kill as many Jews as possible, in a region in and around the Pripyat Marshes, comprising nine raions of the Byelorussian SSR and three raions of the Ukrainian SSR.

These massacres are considered to be the first planned mass murders of civilians carried out by Nazi Germany. At least 13,788 people were killed in phase one and 3,500 Jewish men and boys were killed in phase two. The principal means of execution employed was mass shootings, after the local populace had been rounded up. Other methods were also tried, including driving people into the swamps and drowning them, though this was largely ineffective owing to their shallowness.

Among others, the villages of Dvarets, Khochan', Azyarany, Starazhowtsy and Kramno, were completely destroyed by burning and Turaw was partially destroyed.

== History ==
The operation was ordered by Reichsführer-SS Heinrich Himmler to be conducted by the SS Cavalry Brigade, as well as the Wehrmacht's 162nd Infantry Division and 252nd Infantry Divisions, under the general command of HSSPF Erich von dem Bach-Zelewski. Beginning on 28 July 1941 and lasting until August, the operation was conducted in two stages, with the second stage beginning on 14 August. There is no data on the SS troops' losses in their reports.

Captured German documents about the operation reached the Soviet leadership in Moscow in January 1942, and were published in a note by the People's Commissariat (Ministry) for Foreign Relations, issued on 27 April. The note was addressed to all countries with which the USSR had maintained diplomatic relations. It is believed that the international publicity and shock caused by this data prompted Nazis to hide or destroy other materials concerned with this operation.

== Beginning of the events ==
On 19 July 1941, the 1st and 2nd SS Cavalry Regiments were assigned to the general command of HSSPF von dem Bach-Zelewski for the action which took place in two stages. The beginning date of the operation is considered 28 July 1941. On that day the two SS cavalry regiments were transferred to Baranavichy for the "systematic combing of the Pripyat swamps".

Shortly thereafter, Himmler ordered the SS Cavalry Brigade to be formed under the command of Hermann Fegelein from the 1st and 2nd SS Cavalry Regiments. Also, Himmler ordered von dem Bach-Zelewski to present him with the plan of the extermination operation. The "Special order" of Himmler dated 28 July 1941 ordered von dem Bach-Zelewski to harshly exterminate the Pripyat swamps region's population "with disagreeable attitude to Germans" — to shoot men, deport women and children, confiscate livestock and food, burn habitations. On the other hand, population "showing agreeable attitude to Germans" was to be "spared" and even to be partially armed. Himmler's orders for the operation were passed to Fegelein via SS-Brigadefuhrer Kurt Knoblauch, who met with him and Bach-Zelewski on 28 July in their new quarters at Liakhovichi in Byelorussia. Fegelein interpreted these orders as follows: Enemy soldiers in uniform were to be taken prisoner, and those found out of uniform were to be shot. Jewish males, with the exception of a few skilled workers such as doctors and leather workers, would be shot. Fegelein split the territory to be covered into two sections divided by the Pripyat River, with the 1st Regiment taking the northern half and the 2nd Regiment the south. The regiments worked their way from east to west through their assigned territory, and filed daily reports on the number of people killed and taken prisoner.

Himmler notified Fegelein by telegram on 1 August that the numbers killed so far were too low. A few days later, Himmler issued regimental order no. 42, which called for all male Jews over the age of 14 to be killed. The women and children were to be driven into the swamps and drowned. Thus Fegelein's units were among the first in the Holocaust to wipe out entire Jewish communities. As the water in the swamps was too shallow and some areas had no swamps, it proved impractical to drown the women and children, so in the end they were shot as well.

== The first stage ==
The forces of 1st SS Cavalry Regiment moved from Baranavichy in the direction of Lyakhavichy — Hantsavichy, Baranavichy — Ivatsevichy — Byaroza — Pruzhany, and "combed" the territory to the south, south-east and south-west reaching the Pripyat River. The forces of 2nd SS Cavalry Regiment moved from Lutsk in the directions of Kamen'-Kashirski — Drahichyn — Ivanava and Sarny — Luninyets — Pinsk, and searched the territory to the south and north of the Pripyat River, until making contact with 1st SS Cavalry Regiment.

Coordinating with the 2nd SS Cavalry Regiment's move, Einsatzgruppe B conducted the mass extermination of the Jewish population in Pinsk. Besides that, several elements of the 1st and 2nd SS Cavalry Regiments formed the leading force to block Soviet forces which broke out of the encirclement in the vicinity of Slutsk—Babruysk highway on 27 July.

== The second stage ==
The forces of the SS Cavalry Brigade moved from the initial line of Baranavichy — Luninyets railroad to the east, conducting the "cleansing" of the right and left banks of the Pripyat River keeping south of the highway R-1 (Brest — Slutsk — Babruysk).

In the course of this stage, the 2nd Regiment fought one or two battalions of the Soviet regular and irregular troops on 21 August 1941 near Turaw. According to the report of 29 August, the brigade's losses were 23 dead and wounded, and the losses of Soviet troops were from 600 to 700 dead and 10 prisoners.

In the course of following days the 1st Regiment combed the region of Starobin — Lyuban — Ptsich, and the 2nd Regiment advanced to the east of the line of Kol'na — Lyakhavichy (Knyaz'-Vozyera) towards the Ptsich River. The second stage of the operation ended on either 29 August or 31 August. Fegelein's final report on the operation, dated 18 September, states that they killed 14,178 Jews, 1,001 partisans, and 699 Red Army soldiers with losses of 17 dead, 36 wounded, and 3 missing. The historian Henning Pieper estimates the actual number of Jews killed being closer to 23,700.
