= German Olympic Decoration =

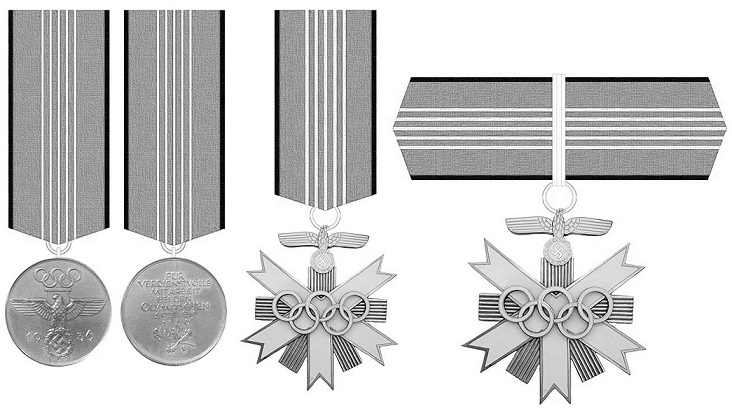
Olympic Decoration insignia from the Nazi period, banned since 1945

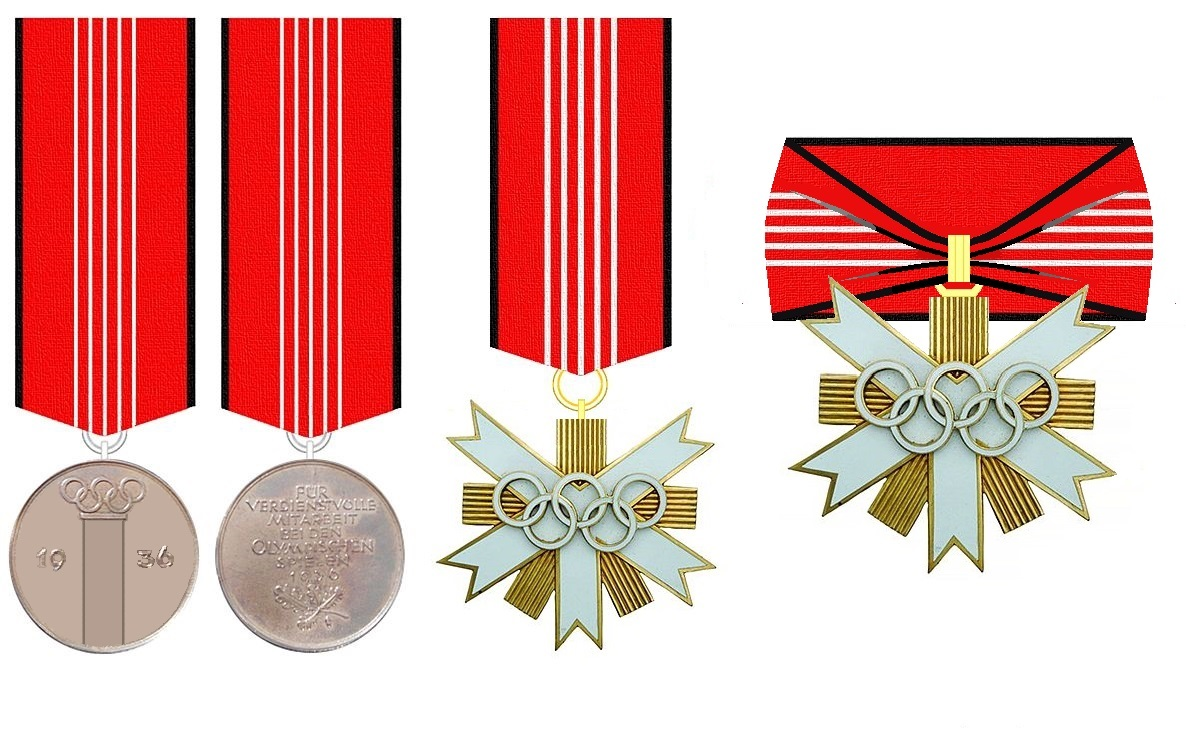
De-nazified insignia of the Olympic Decoration: Commemorative Medal, 2nd Class, 1st Class (from 1957)

The German Olympic Decoration (German: Deutsche Olympia-Ehrenzeichen or Deutsches Olympiaehrenzeichen) was a civil decoration of Nazi Germany awarded to administrators of the IV Olympic Winter Games in Garmisch-Partenkirchen and the Games of the XI Olympiad in Berlin 1936. The award was not intended for actual participants in the Olympic Games, but rather in recognition of those who had orchestrated the "behind the scenes" preparations and work for the events.

Several members of the SS, including Reinhard Heydrich, Karl Wolff and Heinrich Himmler were awarded the Olympic Games decoration for providing security during the event. Hermann Fegelein was awarded the decoration for overseeing the preparation of the courses and facilities for the equestrian events. The decoration was presented to Leni Riefenstahl for her work in filming the various sports events. It was also presented in the 2nd Class to Hiroshi Ōshima, the Japanese Ambassador to Nazi Germany.

The German Olympic Decoration was awarded in three classes:

- 1st Class
- 2nd Class
- German Olympic Commemorative Medal

Of the three classes, the First Class was presented as a neck order. A total of 767 were presented. The second class was open to persons who played a significant, but lesser role as to the work which went into the presentation of the games. A total of 3,364 were awarded. The German Olympic Commemorative Medal (German: Deutsche Olympia-Erinnerungsmedaille) was established to recognize service in connection with the preparation work and execution of the game events. The medal was not restricted to German nationals. All classes could be worn miniaturized on a ribbon bar. Modern German law prohibits the wearing of a swastika, so in 1957 the German federal government authorised replacement decorations in place of the swastika version; which still exists and can be worn as a civil decoration.
