= August Zehender =

German SS general

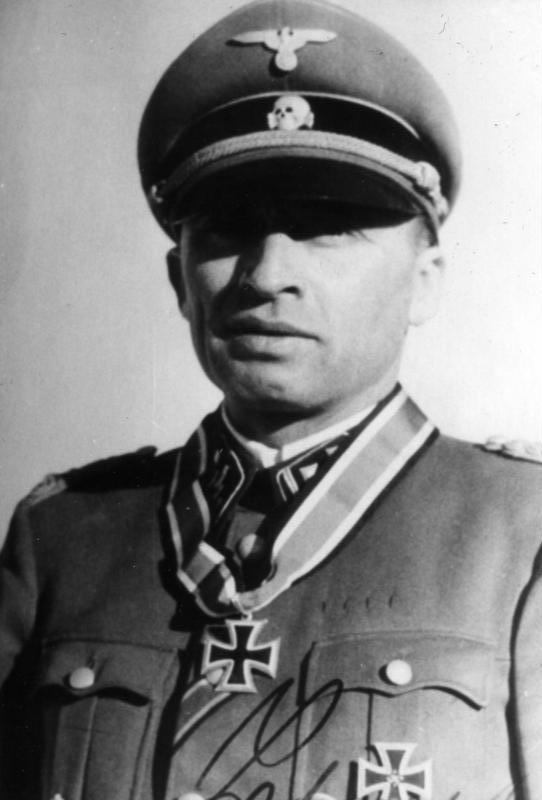
- Zehender in 1943
- Born: 28 April 1903; Aalen, Kingdom of Württemberg, German Empire
- Died: 11 February 1945 (aged 41); Budapest, Hungary
- Military career
- Allegiance: Nazi Germany
- Branch: Waffen SS
- Service years: 1935–1945
- Rank: SS-Brigadeführer und Generalmajor der Waffen-SS
- Unit: SS Division Maria Theresia
- Conflicts: World War II
- Awards: Knight's Cross of the Iron Cross with Oak Leaves; German Cross in Gold

August Zehender (28 April 1903 – 11 February 1945) was a German SS commander during the Nazi era. He led the SS Division Maria Theresia during World War II and was a recipient of the Knight's Cross of the Iron Cross with Oak Leaves. He killed himself in Budapest in the closing months of the war.

== Life ==
Zehender was posted to the SS-Verfügungstruppe in 1935 (his NSDAP party number was 4,263,133 and his SS service number 224,219). He was given command of a motorcycle battalion in the SS Division Das Reich. At the end of June 1941, Zehender was wounded on the Eastern Front at Losza. After his recovery he was posted to the SS Cavalry Brigade. He subsequently served with the 8th SS Cavalry Division Florian Geyer. In the spring of 1944, he was given command of the newly formed 22nd SS Volunteer Cavalry Division "Maria Theresia", with which he fought at the Siege of Budapest later that year.

With his unit encircled by the Red Army, Zehender was severely wounded in action on 11 February 1945 in Budapest and killed himself.

== Awards ==
- German Cross in Gold on 16 October 1942 as SS-Sturmbannführer in SS-Kavallerie-Regiment 2
- Knight's Cross of the Iron Cross with Oak Leaves
  - Knight's Cross on 10 March 1943 as SS-Obersturmbannführer and commander of the SS-Kavallerie-Regiment 2.
  - 722nd Oak Leaves on 1 February 1945 as SS-Brigadeführer and commander of the 22. SS-Freiwilligen-Kavallerie-Division "Maria Theresia"

== See also ==
- List SS-Brigadeführer
