= Wilhelm Trabandt =

August Wilhelm Trabant
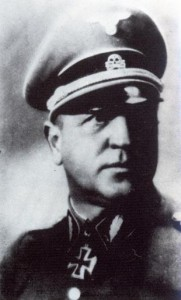
- Born: 21 July 1891; Berlin, Kingdom of Prussia, German Empire
- Died: 19 May 1968 (aged 76); Hamburg, West Germany
- Military career
- Allegiance: Nazi Germany
- Branch: Waffen-SS
- Rank: SS-Brigadeführer
- Commands: 1st SS Infantry Brigade; 18th SS Volunteer Panzergrenadier Division Horst Wessel; Kampfgruppe Böhmen-Mähren
- Awards: Knight's Cross of the Iron Cross

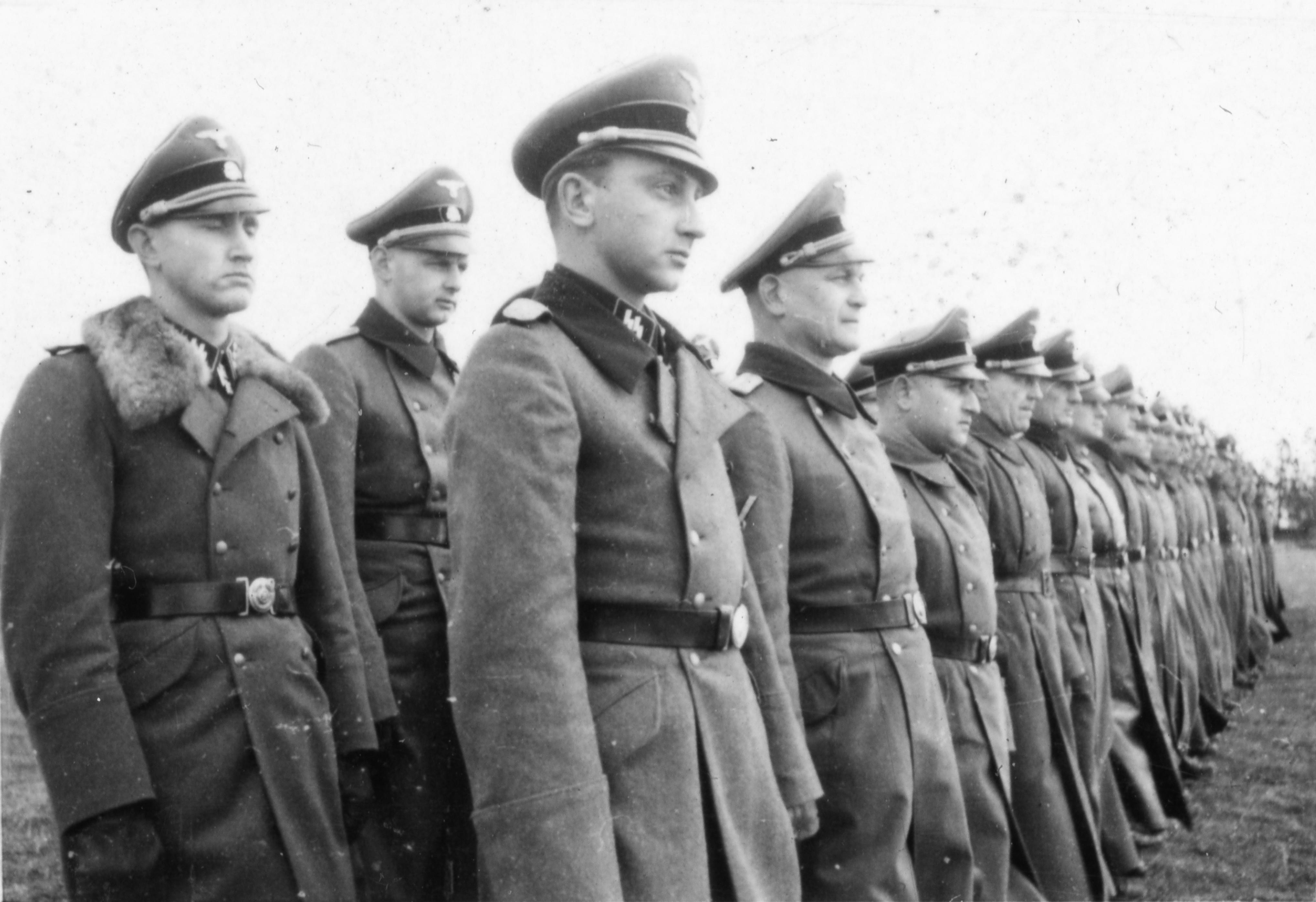
1 SS Infantry Brigade in January 1944, Wilhelm Trabandt in the front row, here as an SS-Standartenführer.

August Wilhelm Trabandt (21 July 1891 – 19 May 1968) was a high-ranking member of the SS during World War II. During the war, Trabandt commanded the 1st SS Infantry Brigade, 18th SS Volunteer Panzergrenadier Division Horst Wessel and Kampfgruppe Böhmen-Mähren. He was a recipient of the Knight's Cross of the Iron Cross of Nazi Germany.

== SS career ==
Trabandt was born in Berlin, Germany on the 21 July 1891. In May 1936, Trabandt volunteered to join the SS-VT. At the start of World War II, Trabandt was the commander of the III. Battalion, Leibstandarte SS Adolf Hitler Regiment. He took part in the Invasion of Poland and the Battle of France. Facing accusations of smuggling following the campaign, Trabandt was posted to the 1st SS Infantry Brigade that was charged with the Nazi security warfare and the murder of the Jewish population in the occupied territories in the Soviet Union. He was given command of the SS Panzergrenadier Regiment 39 in March 1943, and took over command of the Brigade in September 1943.

Trabandt was awarded the Knight's Cross on 6 January 1944, just before the brigade was disbanded and used to form the cadre of the SS Division Horst Wessel. Trabandt was given command of the division and remained in command until April 1945. After the war had ended, Trabandt was imprisoned in the Soviet Union until 1954. He died on 19 May 1968, in Hamburg, Germany.
