= 162nd Infantry Division (Wehrmacht) =

- 162. Infanterie-Division
- Active: 1 December 1939 – 21 May 1943
- Country: Germany
- Branch: Heer (Wehrmacht)
- Type: Infantry
- Size: Division
- Garrison/HQ: Groß Born
- Engagements: Eastern Front Pripyat Marshes massacres Battle of Moscow Battles of Rzhev

Commanders
- Notable commanders: Hermann Franke

The 162nd Infantry Division (162. Infanterie-Division) was an infantry division of the Heer of Nazi Germany's Wehrmacht during World War II.

It is not to be confused with its vastly different successor formation, the 162nd Turkestani Division.

== History ==
The 162nd Infantry Division was formed on 1 December 1939 at Groß Born army training area. It was initially assembled as part of the seventh Aufstellungswelle using replacement units of Wehrkreis II (Stettin) and contained the Infantry Regiment 303 and 314 with three battalions each, as well as the Light Artillery Detachment 236 with three batteries. It initially absorbed the Infantry Replacement Regiments 32 (Kolberg), 207 (Schneidemühl) and 2 (Greifswald). The initial commander of the division was Hermann Franke, who would hold this post until 13 May 1942.

This initial divisional order of battle was later upgraded on 10 January 1940 through the addition of the Field Replacement Battalions 12 (Schwerin), 32 (Köslin) and 24 (Chemnitz), which were used in conjunction with the six preexisting infantry battalions to form three regiments for a total of nine battalions in the division, thus bringing the 162nd Infantry Division to regular strength. Infantry Regiment 303 was reformed from the battalions I./303, II./303 and Field Replacement Battalion 12, Infantry Regiment 314 was reformed from I./314, II./314 and Field Replacement Battalion 32, and the newly-added Infantry Regiment 329 was formed from Field Replacement Battalion 24 and the battalions III./303 and III./314. The addition of II./206 artillery detachment brought the Light Artillery Detachment 236 to a newly-formed Artillery Regiment 236 with three detachments. Furthermore, the Division Units 236 served as a source of divisional support.

On 20 September 1940, the staff of Artillery Regiment 236 was transferred to the 304th Infantry Division, where it was used to form the staff of Artillery Regiment 304. On 5 November of that same year, the staff of Infantry Regiment 329 as well as the battalions I./303 and I./314 were transferred to the 332nd Infantry Division, where they formed the Infantry Regiment 676. These transfers were subsequently replaced to bring the 162nd Infantry Division back to full strength. On 1 January 1941, IV./211 artillery detachment joined Artillery Regiment 236 as the new fourth detachment.

In June 1941, 162nd Infantry Division was part of XX Army Corps, when Operation Barbarossa commenced. The division stood in continuous combat between June 1941 and the winter of 1941/42 and suffered heavy losses during the Battle of Moscow.

On 1 December 1941, the division was equipped with three infantry regiments (303, 314, 329) with three battalions each, of which III./314 battalion was detached to OKH to serve as a guard battalion. Additionally, the division was equipped with Fast Battalion 236, Artillery Regiment 236 (with four detachments and a total of eleven artillery batteries), Signals Battalion 236, Pioneer Battalion 236, and Division Units 236 (with nine supply columns, one fuel column, a maintenance company and a supply company), as well as a motorized field bakery, a butcher company, a divisional administration unit, two medical companies, two ambulance companies, one veterinary company, a military police detachment and a field post office.

On 23 December 1941, the fourth detachment of Artillery Regiment 236 (which had only been formed on 1 January) was dissolved again after casualties sustained in the Kalinin and Rzhev sectors over the course of the year. Infantry Regiment 329 was eventually transferred away, giving II./329 battalion to become I./427 and the staff and III./329 to join II./430 and III./430 under the 129th Infantry Division. Subsequently, the artillery regiment was partitioned and donated in parts to the Artillery Regiments 120, 186, 241, 251, and 253. In April 1942, the 162nd Infantry Division was part of the improvised Battle Group Recke.

On 18 May 1942, the remaining staff units of the division command of 162nd Infantry Division were transported to Stettin to receive reinforcements and to be restructured. Here, the division staff was repurposed to serve as a training unit for pro-German collaborators and volunteers. On 21 May 1942, the 162nd Infantry Division was definitively adjusted for this purpose and became the 162nd Turkestan Division. In the days of this reorganizations of the division, command passed from Franke to Oskar von Niedermayer, whose reputation of foreign policy expertise made him an attractive candidate for the division's intended appeal to foreign volunteers.

== Organizational chart ==
Organizational chart of 162nd Infantry Division, 1939–1942
Year	Month	Army corps	Army	Army group	Area of operations
1939	Dec.	Deployment in Wehrkreis II			Groß Born
1940	Jan./Apr.	Deployment in Wehrkreis II			Groß Born
1940	May	OKH reserve			Darmstadt
1940	Jun.	XXXI	16th Army	Army Group A	Lorraine
1940	Jul./Aug.	XXXV	18th Army	Army Group A	East Prussia
1940	Sep./Dec.	XXXV	4th Army	Army Group B	East Prussia
1941	Jan./Apr.	XXXV	4th Army	Army Group B	East Prussia
1941	May	XV	9th Army	Army Group B	East Prussia
1941	Jun./Jul.	XX	9th Army	Army Group Center	Bialystok
1941	Aug./Sep.	Army group reserves		Army Group Center	Smolensk
1941	Oct./Dec.	XXVII	9th Army	Army Group Center	Vyazma, Rzhev
1942	Jan./Mar.	XXVII	9th Army	Army Group Center	Rzhev
1942	Apr.	Recke	9th Army	Army Group Center	Rzhev
1942	May	In Stettin to be repurposed into 162nd Turkestan Division			
