= 18th SS Volunteer Panzergrenadier Division Horst Wessel =

German armored division

- 18. SS-Freiwilligen Panzergrenadier-Division "Horst Wessel"
- Active: 25 January 1944 – 8 May 1945
- Country: Nazi Germany
- Branch: (Schutzstaffel) Waffen-SS
- Type: Panzergrenadier
- Size: Division

The 18th SS Volunteer Panzergrenadier Division "Horst Wessel" (German: 18. SS-Freiwilligen Panzergrenadier-Division "Horst Wessel") was formed in 1944 around a cadre from the 1st SS Infantry Brigade.

It was used for "rear-security" duties until it was sent to the Eastern front, with the exception of one regiment that fought the Slovak National Uprising in August 1944. During this period, the 1st Battalion of the Sturmbrigade Frankreich fought with the division as the 4th Battalion of SS Rgt. 40 commanded by Sturmbannführer Schaeffer in Galicia. The division later fought as a single unit in Hungary and in Czechoslovakia where it was destroyed.

The Division was named after SA member Horst Wessel, known for being the author of the lyrics to the Nazi Party anthem, the Horst-Wessel-Lied, and glorified by the Nazi regime as a martyr of the party's early years.

== Commanders ==
- SS-Brigadeführer Wilhelm Trabandt (25 January 1944 – 3 January 1945)
- SS-Gruppenführer Josef Fitzthum (3 January 1945 – 10 January 1945)
- SS-Standartenführer Georg Bochmann (10 January 1945 – March 1945)
- SS-Standartenführer Heinrich Petersen (15 March 1945 – 8 May 1945)

== Battles ==
- Hungary (January 1944 – July 1944)
- Eastern front, central sector (July 1944 – October 1944)
- Poland & Czechoslovakia (October 1944 – May 1945)

== See also ==
- List of Waffen-SS units
- List of military units named after people
