= 1st SS Infantry Brigade =

- 1. SS-Infanteriebrigade
- Active: April 1941 – January 1944
- Country: Nazi Germany
- Branch: Waffen-SS
- Type: Infantry
- Role: Nazi security warfare Participation in The Holocaust
- Size: Brigade

Commanders
- Notable commanders: Karl Fischer von Treuenfeld; Erich von dem Bach-Zelewsky

The 1st SS Infantry Brigade (German: 1. SS-Infanteriebrigade) was a unit of the German Waffen SS formed from former concentration camp guards for service in the Soviet Union behind the main front line during the Second World War. They conducted Nazi security warfare in the rear of the advancing German troops and took part in the Holocaust. The unit also filled gaps in the front line when called upon in emergencies. In 1944, the brigade was used as the cadre in the formation of the SS Division Horst Wessel.

== Invasion of the Soviet Union ==
The 1 SS Infantry Brigade (mot) was formed on 21 April 1941, from men of the SS-Totenkopfverbände (concentration camp guards). It received the designation of the 1st SS Infantry Brigade (motorised) on 20 September 1941.

When Germany invaded the Soviet Union (Operation Barbarossa) in June 1941, the brigade was stationed in Kraków, Poland awaiting its full complement of men and materials. On 23 July the unit moved east into the occupied territories and between July and August 1941, mopping up dispersed Red Army units in the rear of Army Group South. On 9 August, the brigade was north of Zhitomir and was asked to cover the northern flank of the 6th Army in the Pinsk Marshes. The brigade next operated behind the XVII Army Corps and on 23 August, crossed the Dnieper River.

During the remainder of the year and until late 1942 the unit was assigned to the Reich Security Main Office, which also had the SS Cavalry Brigade and the 2nd SS Infantry Brigade under command. In the autumn of 1941, the brigade actively took part in The Holocaust as part of Einsatzgruppe C and took part in the liquidation of the Jewish population of the Soviet Union, forming firing parties when required. The three brigades were responsible for the murder of tens of thousands of the population by the end of 1941, and they destroyed at least one village st Białystok for no apparent reason as they had not been engaged from it.

On 12 December 1941, the brigade was placed under the command of the 56th Infantry Division on the orders of Army Group Center when a gap appeared in the front line of the 2nd Army in the area of Tula, Yelets Liwny. On 28 December 1941, the unit was placed under the command of LV Army Corps.

== 1942 ==
The brigade spent the winter in fighting defensive battles in the front line, then received new orders. They were again to form a rear-area security unit. From January to August they took part in security and defensive duties around the area of Kursk and a new commander, Karl Fischer von Treuenfeld, arrived in July. The unit remained in the Kursk area until 11 August when it was sent to the Minsk area.

On 11 October, the brigade was in the Vydritsa sector in occupied Belarus (where Erich von dem Bach-Zelewsky was the SS and Police Leader). It took part in the Operation Karlsbad (11 September to 23 October); also participating were the SS-Sonderbataillon Dirlewanger, SS Schuma Battalion 255 of the Ukrainian Auxiliary Police and the 1st Battalion, Légion des Volontaires Français. By the end of it the brigade had recorded the killing of 1051 civilians and alleged partisans for the loss of 24 dead and 65 wounded.

The brigade next took part in the Operation Freda (5 to 9 November), together with the SS-Sonderbataillon Dirlewanger near Borisov. The reported casualties from the operation were light with 2 men killed and 10 missing compared to several hundred dead "partisans", most likely civilians.

The unit was next used in another security action, Operation Nürnberg (19 to 25 November), with Police Kampfgruppe von Gottberg. The operation took place between Glebokie and Wilna. The operation was under the command of Brigadeführer Curt von Gottberg with SS Polizei Regiment 14, two Schuma battalions and a town Gendarmerie unit in support of the 1 SS Infantry Brigade. The operation resulted in 2984 Soviet casualties. At the end of 1942 they took part in the Battle of Velikiye Luki when the Soviet forces encircled the town of Velikiye Luki. The 83rd Infantry Division which was trapped in the pocket and was destroyed. The 1 SS Infantry Brigade, along with Frikorps Danmark, who had participated in the attempts to break the encirclement under Kampfgruppe Chevallerie had suffered heavy casualties in the process.

== 1943 ==
In 1943 the brigade came under the command of the LIX Corps in the 3rd Panzer Army. On 4 February they were located at Podluschje. They took part in Operation Kugelblitz (22 February to 8 March) attached to the 201st Sicherungs Division. Operation Kugelblitz was an anti Belarusian partisans sweep in the area of Vitebsk - Gorodok - Gorki and Sennitsa Lake. They also took part in the followup Operation Donnerkeil (31 March to 2 April) the second operation was ordered by the 3rd Panzer Army.

In May 1943, the brigade formed a cadre for the 3 Estonian SS Volunteer Brigade and on 7 July it was sent to Borisov on another security sweep. They participated in Operation Hermann (7 July) with various other units under the command of Generalmajor of Polizei von Gottberg.

On 1 August, the brigade took part in the security and depopulation operation in the area Jeremicze-Starzyna-Rudnja-Kupinsk. The goal was to murder or deport the local population and seize livestock and agricultural supplies.

They were again moved into the front line in September to reinforce the 25th Panzergrenadier Division, which was fighting in the Smolensk-Gomel sector. Smolensk was abandoned on 24 September and the brigade reported that during the fighting they had lost 215 killed in action, 1172 wounded and 77 missing.

On 12 November, the brigade units were redesignated the former SS Infantry Regiment 8 and SS Infantry Regiment 10 now became known as the SS Grenadier Regiment 39 and SS Grenadier Regiment 40. To counter the Soviet offensive on 10 November the Brigade formed SS Kampfgruppe Trabandt which came under the command of the 36th Infantry Division. They fought at the Rogatschew bridgehead until they were transferred to the bridgehead at Stassewka on 2 December.

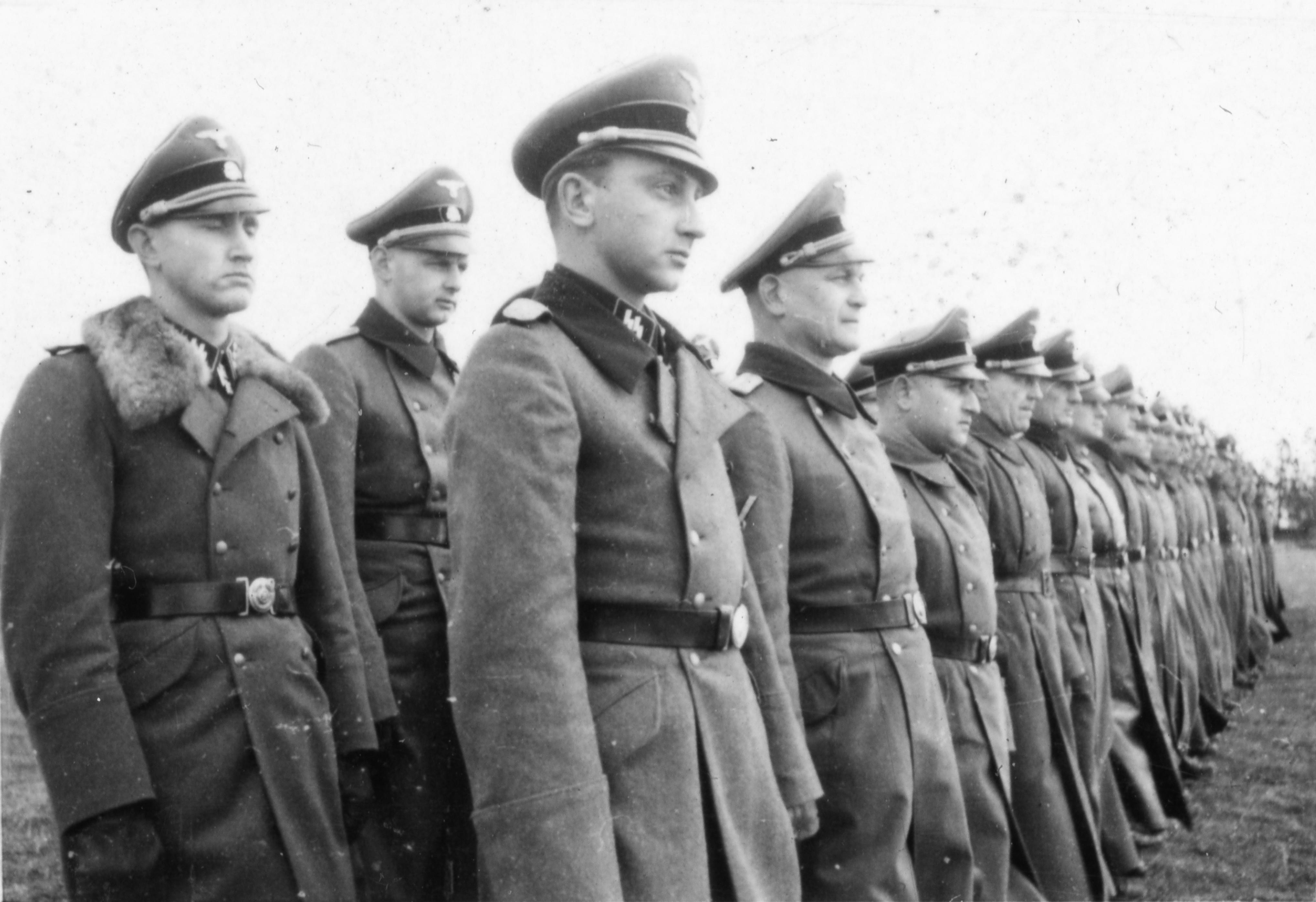
1 SS Infantry Brigade January 1944, Standartenführer Wilhelm Trabandt in the front row

In December, the brigade took part in Operation Nikolaus which started on 20 December and formed the 9th Army's southern pincer group attacking towards the 2nd Army alongside the 16th Panzer Division, 258th Infantry Division, 134th Infantry Divisions and Cavalry Regiment Mitte. The counterattack filled the gap between the 2nd and 9th Army's which had been created by the Soviet push towards Bobruisk in November that year. The attack was succeeded and the gap was closed on 22 December.

At the end of December 1943 the Brigade was ordered to move to East Prussia. After they reached the troop training grounds Stablack near Königsberg they were reformed.

== 1944 ==
The 1 SS Infantry Brigade (mot) was disbanded on 24 January 1944 when it was used to form the 18th SS Volunteer Panzergrenadier Division Horst Wessel.

== War crimes ==
The brigade took an active part in the killing of the Jewish population assisting the Einsatzgruppen, in the town of Ushomir where it took part in the killing of all male Jews.

Untersturmführer Max Täubner commanded a workshop detail in the brigade and was tried by an SS court in May 1943, along with four other Waffen-SS men, for unauthorized and sadistic killings of a large number of Jews in 1941 and for taking photos of the killings showing them to wife and friends. In the indictment, the SS court, while affirming the intentions of the SS to exterminate the Jews, stated "The accused allowed his men to act with such vicious brutality that they conducted themselves under his command like a savage horde".

The case against four other defendants under Täubner's command was dismissed by the judge Standartenführer Dr. Reinecke. The photos and negatives were later ordered to be destroyed.

Täubner, who had been given a sentence of 10 years, was pardoned in January 1945 and released from prison.

In another version of this trial Täubner was convicted of disregarding secrecy provisions surrounding the exterminations, expelled from the SS, deprived of his civil rights and sentenced to ten years imprisonment, for behavior that was "unworthy of an honorable and decent German man."

Vasyl Valdeman, a Jewish resident of Ostroh reported: "We knew something would be done to us here. When we saw people hit and driven along here with spades, even small children realised why people were carrying the spades."

One of the members of the 1st SS Infantry Brigade at the time was Hans Friedrich. He claims not to recall exactly which actions he took part in that summer, but he does admit to participating in killings like the one in Ostrog. "They were so utterly shocked and timid, you could do with them what you wanted.'"

Vasyl Valdeman: "Kids were crying, the sick were crying, the elderly were praying to God. Not on their knees but seated or lying down. It was very tough to go through it all, hearing all this wailing and crying. Then they had everyone get up and said 'Go', and as soon as people started moving, they selected people for shooting, for execution."

The selected Ukrainian Jews were taken out to this spot and a pit was dug. In scenes which were repeated right across the areas of the Soviet Union occupied by the Nazis, men, women and children were ordered to strip and prepare to die. The killings went on into the evening. Vasyl Valdeman and his mother managed to escape and hide in a nearby village. But the SS killed his father, grandfather and two uncles.

Vasyl Valdeman: "That's how it was—the first execution—the most horrible one. It wasn't the last one. There were three more large executions after that with 2000 to 3000 people shot at every one of them. More people were executed afterwards in smaller scale ones and this is how the Jewish community of Ostrog was annihilated."

== Casualties ==
Between formation in 1941 and January 1944 the Brigade reported the following casualties, from an establishment of 6,271 officers and men:

- Killed 20 officers, 306 NCOs and other ranks
- Wounded 38 officers, 805 NCOs and other ranks
- Missing 4 officers, 119 NCOs and other ranks

== Commanders ==
- Brigadeführer Karl Demelhuber (24 April 1941 – 25 June 1941)
- Oberführer Richard Herrmann (25 June 1941 – 27 December 1941)
- Brigadeführer Wilhelm Hartenstein (27 December 1941 – November 1942)
- Obergruppenführer Erich von dem Bach-Zelewsky (December 1942)
- Brigadeführer Wilhelm Harenstein (December 1942 – May 1943)
- Brigadeführer Karl Herrmann (31 July 1943 – October 1943)
- Sturmbannführer Wilhelm Trabandt (18 October 1943 – 24 Jan 1944)

== Bibliography ==
- Terry Goldsworthy, Valhalla's Warriors: A history of the Waffen-SS on the Eastern Front 1941–1945
- Hannes Heer & Klaus Naumann (eds.), War of Extermination: The German Military in World War II 1941–1944, Berghahn Books, 2000, ISBN 1-57181-232-6
- Ernst Klee, Willi Dressen, Volker Riess – The Good Old Days: The Holocaust as Seen by Its Perpetrators
