= Kurt Knoblauch =

SS-Obergruppenführer (1885–1952)

- Born: December 10, 1885; Marienwerder, German Empire
- Died: November 10, 1952 (aged 66); Munich, West Germany
- Military career
- Allegiance: German Empire; Weimar Republic; Nazi Germany
- Branch: Imperial German Army; Reichswehr; Waffen-SS
- Rank: Oberst; SS-Obergruppenführer
- Conflicts: World War I World War II
- Awards: Clasp to the Iron Cross, 1st and 2nd class War Merit Cross, 1st and 2nd class with swords Honour Cross of the World War 1914/1918; Wound Badge

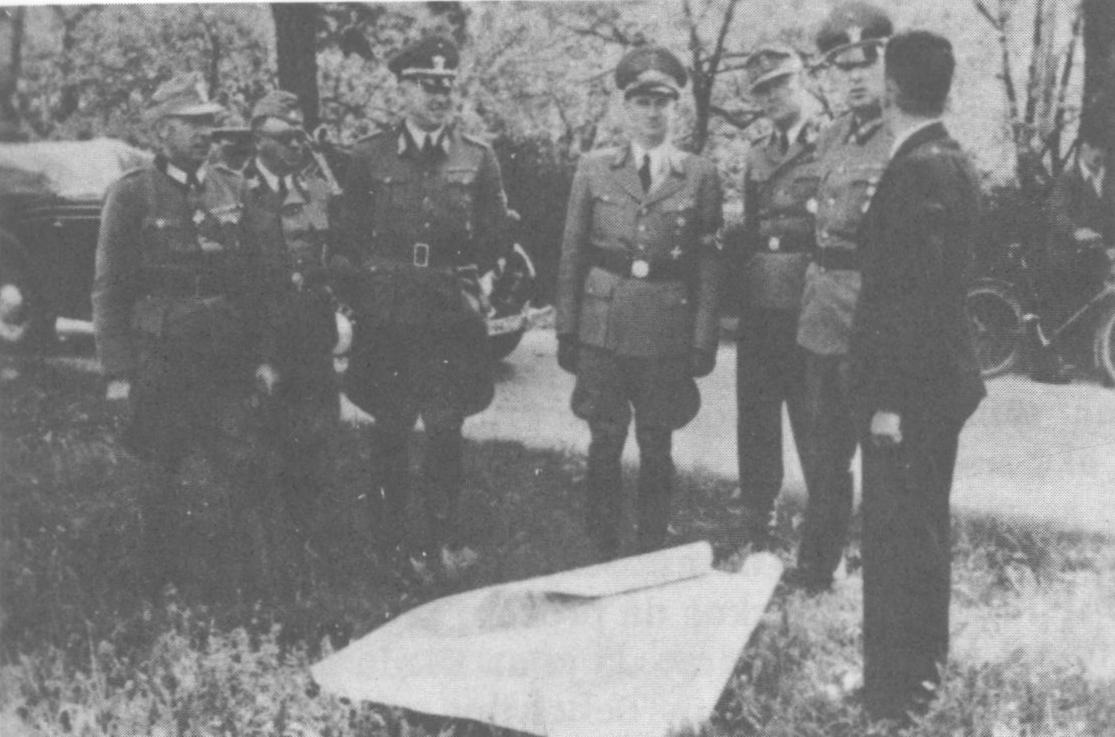
Hermann Franz, Kurt Knoblauch, Poročnik Lang, Friedrich Rainer, Erwin Rösener, Kurt Daluege at Helmut Hierzegger, Austria on 3 July 1941

Kurt Knoblauch (December 10, 1885 – November 10, 1952) was a German army officer and Waffen-SS general.

== Biography ==
Knoblauch was a son of the tax collector Friedrich Knoblauch (? - September 25, 1922) and his wife Emma, née Schröder. After graduating from high school in Ratzeburg, on February 23, 1905, Knoblauch joined the Prussian Army as a cadet in the 39th (Lower Rhenish) Fusilier Regiment. On August 18, 1906, he was promoted to lieutenant. On October 18, 1909, he was transferred to the 70th (8th Rhenish) Infantry Regiment and served as platoon commander. In May 1911 he was seconded to the 8th (1st Rhenish) Engineer Battalion for a month to gain engineering experience in the field. On October 1, 1912, Knoblauch became battalion adjutant and on February 17, 1914, he was promoted to first lieutenant. On May 1, 1914, he was transferred to the Saarbrücken district command. During World War I, starting on August 2, 1914, he became a company commander in the 32nd Brigade Replacement Battalion. On June 18, 1915, he was promoted to captain. During the war he was wounded several times and was awarded the Iron Cross, 1st and 2nd class.

In 1919, after the war, Knoblauch served in the Freikorps Deutsche Schutzdivision before being taken over by the Provisional Reichswehr. He first headed the 4th Machine Gun Company, then became chief of the 12th Company of the 3rd Rifle Regiment, and then served as intelligence officer in the 18th Infantry Regiment in Paderborn. On February 1, 1926, he was promoted to major and then to lieutenant colonel on April 1, 1930. As such he led the 2nd Battalion of the 1st (Prussian) Infantry Regiment. On April 1, 1931, Knoblauch became a member of the regimental staff. He retired from the army on March 31, 1933, having received his final promotion to Oberst in February. Knoblauch joined the Nazi Party on April 20, 1933, (membership number 2,750,158) and joined the Sturmabteilung (SA). He served full-time as an SA leader until stepping down on April 12, 1935, to join the Schutzstaffel (SS No. 266,653).

From 1937 onward, he served in the Nazi Party Chancellery in aiding war preparations.

In May 1940, he was appointed Inspector of the Replacement Units of the SS Totenkopf Division and became one of Heinrich Himmler's closest confidants. In December 1940 he became Commander of the Waffen-SS in the Netherlands. On April 7, 1941, he was appointed as Chief of Staff of the Kommandostab Reichsführer-SS (Command Staff Reich Leader-SS). In July 1942 he was transferred to the SS Führungshauptamt to head the training department (Amtsgruppe B). In that position he was also responsible for the coordination of SS support for Wehrmacht and police operations, including persecution of the Jews in instances like the Pripyat Marshes massacres. In 1943 he was replaced by Ernst Rode. In June 1944, he was promoted to SS-Obergruppenführer. During the war, he was awarded the Clasp to the Iron Cross, and the War Merit Cross.

In December 1949, during the denazification after the war, Knoblauch was classified as an activist (Offender, Category II) by the Munich Courts and sentenced to two years in a labor camp. In June 1950, a Munich arbitration court rejected Knoblauch's appeal, and confirmed the verdict of the first court.

== See also ==
- Register of SS leaders in general's rank
- The Holocaust in the Soviet Union
