= SS Cavalry Brigade =

SS Cavalry brigade
- SS-Kavallerie-Brigade
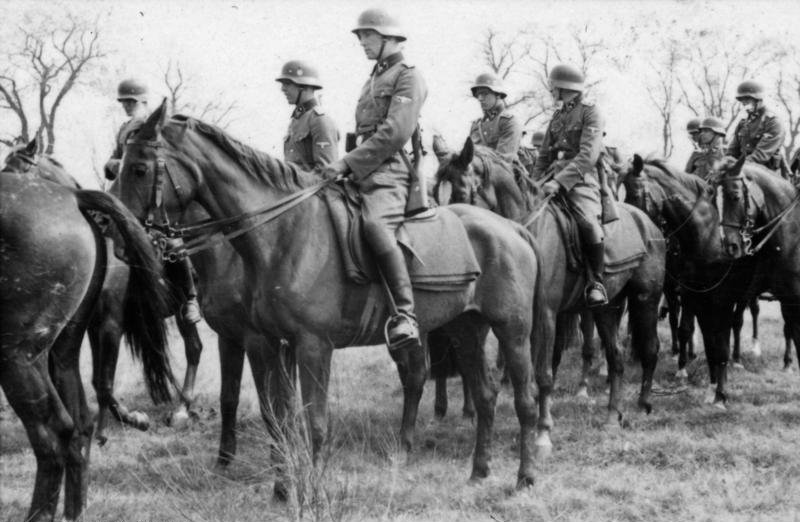
- SS Cavalry Brigade of the Waffen-SS, 23 September 1941 USSR
- Active: 1940–1942
- Country: Nazi Germany
- Branch: (Schutzstaffel) Waffen-SS
- Type: Cavalry
- Size: Brigade

Commanders
- Notable commanders: Hermann Fegelein

The SS Cavalry Brigade (SS-Kavallerie-Brigade) was a unit of the German Waffen-SS during World War II. Operating under the control of the Kommandostab Reichsführer-SS, it initially performed rear security duties in German-occupied Poland. During the Invasion of the Soviet Union, the brigade operated in the rear of the German forces, in the Army Group Rear Area Command. It engaged bypassed Red Army units and carried out murders of Jews, Communists and suspected Soviet partisans. In 1942, the brigade was disbanded and its personnel was transferred to the newly formed SS Division Florian Geyer.

== Formation ==
The SS Cavalry Brigade was based on the SS Totenkopf Horse Regiment, which was raised in September 1939, for police and security duties in Poland, under the command of Hermann Fegelein. By April 1940, it consisted of 8 Saber Squadrons, 9th Replacement, 10th Heavy and 11th Technical Squadrons and a 12th Horse Battery of four 80mm guns. In May it was divided into two regiments, SS Totenkopf Horse Regiments 1 & 2, each of four squadrons, 5th Heavy and 6th Horse Battery also included were Signals, Engineer and Motorcycle platoons.

In March 1941 they were renamed SS Cavalry Regiments 1 and 2 and reformed again into 1st, 2nd and 3rd Saber Squadrons, 4th (Machine Gun), 5th (Mortar and Infantry Gun), 6th (Technical), 7th (Bicycle) and 8th (Horse Battery) Squadrons. In early August 1941, Himmler ordered the SS Cavalry Brigade to be formed under the command of Hermann Fegelein from the 1st and 2nd SS cavalry regiments. Personnel were taken from the saber squadrons to form the brigade's Artillery, Engineer and Bicycle (Reconnaissance) Squadrons. They were also given a light anti-aircraft battery. The brigade now had a strength of 3,500 men, 2,900 horses and 375 vehicles.

== Soviet Union ==
After the German invasion of the Soviet Union (Operation Barbarossa), the SS cavalry regiments, along with the 1 SS Infantry Brigade were assigned to "pacify" what was seen as the main trouble spots in the occupied territories. On 19 July 1941, the SS cavalry regiments were transferred to the general command of HSSPF Erich von dem Bach-Zelewski for action in the area of the Pripet marsh, a large area of land that covered parts of Belorussia and northern Ukraine. Thereafter, the regiments combined to become the SS Cavalry Brigade. They were ordered to perform the "systematic combing of the Pripyat swamps". The SS Cavalry Brigade was assigned because it was more mobile and better able to carry out large-scale operations; the brigade played a pivotal role in the transition from "selective mass murder" to the wholesale extermination of the Jewish population of the occupied part of the Soviet Union.

By 1 August, the SS Cavalry Regiment was responsible for the death of 800 people; five days later, on 6 August, this total had reached 3,000 "Jews and Partisans". Also on 1 August, after a meeting between Heinrich Himmler, Erich von Bach-Zelewski and Hinrich Lohse, the brigade received the following: "Explicit order by RFSS All Jews must be shot. Drive the female Jews into the swamps." Gustav Lombard, on receiving the order, advised his battalion that: "In future not one male Jew is to remain alive not one family in the villages".

Throughout the next weeks, members of the SS Cavalry Regiment 1, under Lombard's command, murdered an estimated 11,000 Jews and more than 400 dispersed soldiers of the Red Army. Sturmbannführer Franz Magill and his men of the SS Cavalry Regiment 2, assisted in the roundup of all the men aged 18 to 55 in the city of Pinsk, where 5,000 to 8,000 men were shot and shortly afterwards, another 2,000 residents including women, children and older men were murdered. Fegelein's final report on the operation, dated 18 September 1941, states that they killed 14,178 Jews, 1,001 partisans, and 699 Red Army soldiers with losses of 17 dead, 36 wounded, and 3 missing. The historian Henning Pieper estimates the actual number of Jews killed was closer to 23,700.

General of Infantry Max von Schenckendorff, commander of Army Group Rear Area behind Army Group Centre described their operations the following way:

The SS Cavalry Brigade operates as follows: at dawn, without prior reconnaissance, the troop tasked with the inspection of a village rides into it at full speed and out the other end, occupies the outer edges of the village in a trice, in accordance with an agreed plan, and then gathers the whole population together, including women and children, for inspection. In many cases the skill and experience of the commanding officer, and also of the accompanying SD and GFP groups together with their interpreters, will decide upon the composition of the male inhabitants and their occupation, as well as upon their fate, so that the area is cleared of opposition and pacified.

After the Soviet counterattack in January 1942, the only large formation not already committed was the SS Cavalry Brigade. Launching an attack on 7 January, it was also forced back after only one day's fighting when it had run out of ammunition. One of its Battalions also reported 75% casualties when fighting in the woods north of Rzhev. The Brigade was found to be wanting and not equipped or trained to take on the Soviet armoured units.

In March 1942, the SS Cavalry Brigade was used as the cadre in the formation of the 8th SS Cavalry Division Florian Geyer.

== Post-war ==
German authorities investigated the activities of the SS cavalry formations in the 1960s.
