= Fritz Witt =

German Waffen SS commander (1908–1944)

- Born: 27 May 1908; Hohenlimburg, German Empire
- Died: 14 June 1944 (aged 36); Venoix, Occupied France
- Burial place: Champigny-Saint-André German war cemetery
- Military career
- Allegiance: Nazi Germany
- Branch: Waffen-SS
- Service years: 1933–1944
- Rank: SS-Brigadeführer
- Commands: SS Division Hitlerjugend
- Conflicts: Invasion of Normandy †
- Awards: Knight's Cross of the Iron Cross with Oak Leaves

Fritz Witt (27 May 1908 – 14 June 1944) was a Waffen-SS commander during the Nazi era. During World War II, he served with the SS Division Leibstandarte before taking command of the SS Division Hitlerjugend. He was killed in action in June 1944.

== Early life and career ==
Born in 1908 into the family of a merchant, Witt worked in the textile industry until he lost his job in June 1931. Witt joined the Nazi Party (NSDAP) (Nr. 816,769) in December 1931 and the SS (Nr. 21,518). In March 1933, Witt became a member of the SS-Stabswache Berlin, a bodyguard unit protecting Adolf Hitler. It was renamed to SS-Sonderkommando Berlin in September and in the following month, Witt was appointed a platoon leader. This unit was the nucleus of the later SS Division Leibstandarte (LSSAH). In January 1935, Witt was appointed company commander in the SS-Standarte Deutschland, a unit that later became part of the SS Division Das Reich.

== World War II ==
Witt participated in the German Invasion of Poland in September 1939 as a member of the motorized infantry regiment Deutschland, which was subordinated to Panzer Division Kempf, a combined arms unit commanded by army General Werner Kempf. Witt's unit took part in the Battle of the Border and then in the fighting at Zakroczym, where men from Panzer Division Kempf committed the Massacre in Zakroczym on 28 September 1939. During the campaign, Witt was awarded both classes of the Iron Cross.

On 19 October 1939, Witt was appointed battalion commander in the SS-Regiment Deutschland, leading the battalion in the Battle of the Netherlands and the Battle of France. On 4 September 1940, Witt was awarded the Knight's Cross of the Iron Cross. He was then transferred to the LSSAH on 16 October 1940 as battalion commander.

As a battalion commander in the LSSAH, Witt participated in the Battle of Greece (6–30 April 1941), the Axis invasion of the Allied Kingdom of Greece. On 11–12 April 1941, Witt's battalion participated in the assault on the Klidi Pass, sustaining heavy casualties in the attack. On 14 April 1941, the battalion fought against British forces in the Battle of Kleisoura Pass. Witt's brother, Franz, a member of the same unit, was killed during the fighting.

=== Divisional command ===
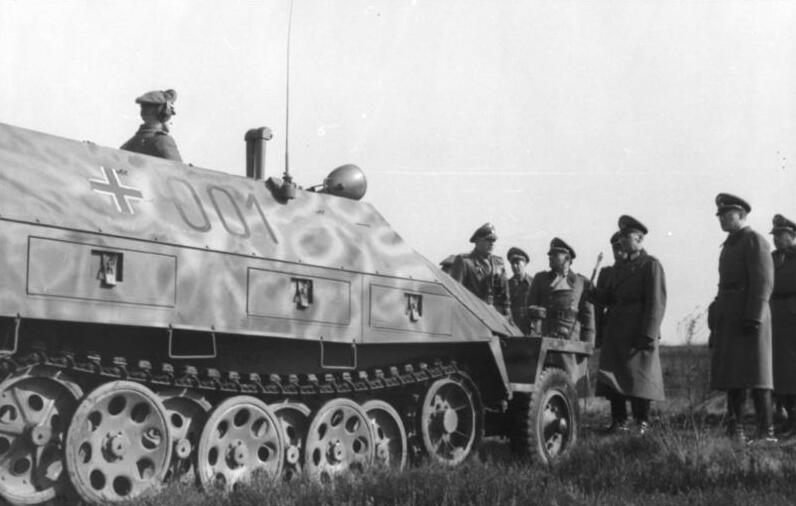
Field Marshal Gerd von Rundstedt inspects SS Division Hitlerjugend at Beverloo Camp, January 1944.

On 1 July 1943, Witt was promoted to SS-Oberführer and was appointed commander of the SS Division Hitlerjugend, the majority of its enlisted men were drawn from members of the Hitler Youth. His previous regimental command was given to Albert Frey. In the following months, Witt oversaw the formation and training of the division at Beverloo Camp, in occupied Belgium.

In expectation of the Allied invasion, the SS Panzer Hitlerjugend was transferred to France in March 1944. On 1 April 1944, elements of the division committed the Ascq massacre in Ascq, France. In command of those troops was Walter Hauck, a company commander in Hitlerjugend.

On 20 April 1944, Witt was promoted to SS-Brigadeführer. On 6 June 1944, the Western Allies launched the Invasion of Normandy. During the fighting in Normandy, Kurt Meyer, a regimental commander in Hitlerjugend, used the Ardenne Abbey for his regimental headquarters. On 7 June, members of the division under Kurt Meyer's command murdered Canadian POWs in what became known as the Ardenne Abbey massacre. When Witt learned about these crimes, he ordered an investigation and demanded a written report from Kurt Meyer.

On 14 June 1944, Witt was killed in action by a Royal Navy artillery barrage that hit the divisional command post at Venoix. He was initially buried at Venoix and later reinterred at Champigny-Saint-André German war cemetery, France.

== Awards ==
- Iron Cross (1939) 2nd Class (17 September 1939) & 1st Class (26 September 1939)
- German Cross in Gold on 8 February 1942 as SS-Obersturmbannführer in the SS-Division Leibstandarte
- Knight's Cross of the Iron Cross with Oak Leaves
  - Knight's Cross on 4 September 1940 as SS-Sturmbannführer and commander of the I./SS-Standarte "Deutschland".
  - 200th Oak Leaves on 1 March 1943 as SS-Standartenführer and commander of SS-Regiment Leibstandarte

== Bibliography ==
- Birn, Ruth Bettina (2006). "Spät, aber gründlich. Die Ermittlungen gegen Kriegsverbrecher in Kanada". In Frei, Norbert (ed.). Transnationale Vergangenheitspolitik. Der Umgang mit deutschen Kriegsverbrechern in Europa nach dem Zweiten Weltkrieg. Göttingen: Wallstein. ISBN 978-3-89244-940-9.
- Cook, Stan; Bender, Roger James (1994). Leibstandarte SS Adolf Hitler: Uniforms, Organization, & History. San Jose, CA: James Bender Publishing. ISBN 978-0-912138-55-8.
- Datner, Szymon (1961). Zbrodnie Wehrmachtu na jeńcach wojennych armii regularnych w II wojnie światowej [Crimes of the Wehrmacht: on regular army POWs in World War II] (in Polish). Warszawa, Poland: Wydawnictwo Ministerstwa obrony narodowej. OCLC 491616631.
- Margolian, Howard (2000) [1998]. Conduct Unbecoming: The Story of the Murder of Canadian Prisoners of War in Normandy. Toronto: University of Toronto Press. ISBN 978-0802083609.
- Patzwall, Klaus D.; Scherzer, Veit (2001). Das Deutsche Kreuz 1941 – 1945 Geschichte und Inhaber Band II [The German Cross 1941 – 1945 History and Recipients Volume 2] (in German). Norderstedt, Germany: Verlag Klaus D. Patzwall. ISBN 978-3-931533-45-8.
- Scherzer, Veit (2007). Die Ritterkreuzträger 1939–1945 [The Knight's Cross Bearers 1939–1945] (in German). Jena, Germany: Scherzers Militaer-Verlag. ISBN 978-3-938845-17-2.
- Stein, George H. (1984). The Waffen SS: Hitler's Elite Guard at War, 1939–1945. Ithaca, NY: Cornell University Press. ISBN 978-0-8014-9275-4.
- Stockert, Peter (2012) [1997]. Die Eichenlaubträger 1939–1945 Band 2 [The Oak Leaves Bearers 1939–1945 Volume 2] (in German) (4th ed.). Bad Friedrichshall, Germany: Friedrichshaller Rundblick. ISBN 978-3-9802222-9-7.
- Thomas, Franz (1998). Die Eichenlaubträger 1939–1945 Band 2: L–Z [The Oak Leaves Bearers 1939–1945 Volume 2: L–Z] (in German). Osnabrück, Germany: Biblio-Verlag. ISBN 978-3-7648-2300-9.
- Stollberg-Rilinger, Barbara, ed. (2003). Westfälische Forschungen, Band 53 [Westphalian Research, Volume 53]. Münster, Germany: Aschendorff. ISBN 978-3-402-09232-3.
- Westemeier, Jens (2013). Himmlers Krieger: Joachim Peiper und die Waffen-SS in Krieg und Nachkriegszeit [Himmler's Warriors: Joachim Peiper and the Waffen-SS during the War and Post-War Period]. Paderborn, Germany: Ferdinand Schöningh. ISBN 978-3-506-77241-1.

Military offices
Preceded by none	Commander of SS Division Hitlerjugend; 24 June 1943 – 14 June 1944	Succeeded by SS-Brigadeführer Kurt Meyer
