= Institute for Contemporary Publishing Archives =

Institute for Contemporary Publishing Archives L'Institut mémoires de l'édition contemporaine
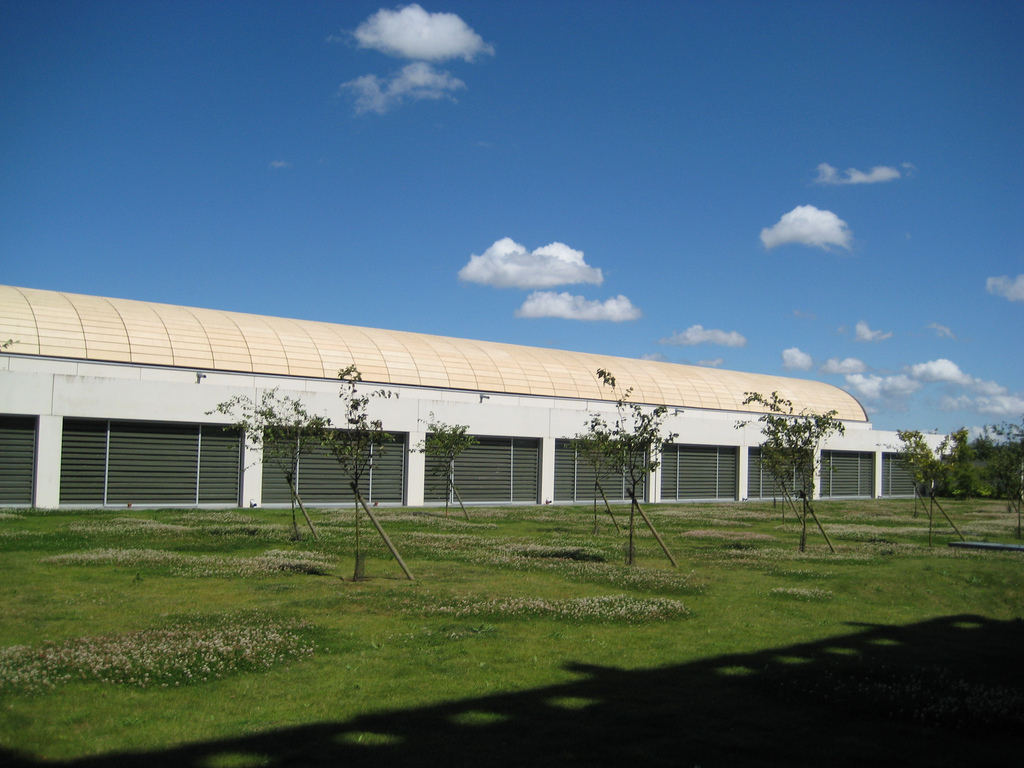
- Interactive map of Institute for Contemporary Publishing Archives; L'Institut mémoires de l'édition contemporaine
- 49°11′48″N 0°24′48″W
- Alternative name: IMEC
- Location: Saint-Germain-la-Blanche-Herbe, Calvados, Normandy, France
- Established: 1988
- Directrice: Nathalie Léger

Building information
- Building: Ardenne Abbey
- Heritage status: Monument historique
- Website: imec-archives.com

The Institute for Contemporary Publishing Archives (French: L'Institut mémoires de l'édition contemporaine, IMEC) is an institution created in 1988 on the initiative of researchers and professionals in French publishing to gather archives and studies related to the main French publishing houses. It also collects material concerning French magazines and various other players in French literary life. IMEC is a not-for-profit organisation. Since 2004 it has been based at the Ardenne Abbey near Caen, Normandy, where it has a library of 80,000 books, and more than 15 km of shelving. The reading room is open to researchers.
