= Kurt Meyer =

German SS officer (1910–1961)

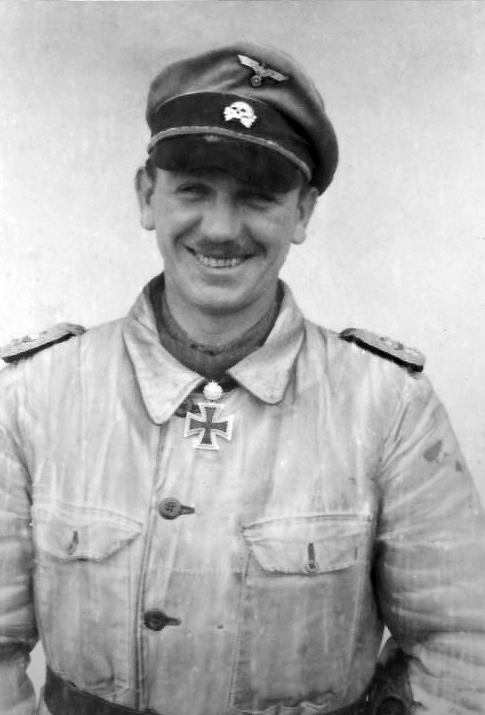
- Meyer in 1943
- Born: 23 December 1910; Jerxheim, Lower Saxony, German Empire
- Died: 23 December 1961 (aged 51); Hagen, North Rhine-Westphalia, West Germany
- Known for: Ardenne Abbey massacre Spokesperson for HIAG
- Status: Deceased
- Conviction: War crimes (3 counts)
- Penalty: Death; commuted to life imprisonment; further commuted to 14 years imprisonment
- 'SS career'
- Allegiance: Nazi Germany
- Branch: Waffen-SS
- Service years: 1934–1944
- Rank: SS-Brigadeführer
- Nickname: "Panzermeyer"
- Service number: NSDAP #316,714; SS #17,559
- Commands: 12th SS Panzer Division Hitlerjugend
- Conflicts: World War II: Battle of France; Balkans Campaign; Operation Barbarossa; Third Battle of Kharkov; Operation Overlord (POW)
- Awards: Knight's Cross of the Iron Cross with Oak Leaves and Swords

Kurt Meyer (23 December 1910 – 23 December 1961) was an SS commander and convicted war criminal of Nazi Germany. He served in the Waffen-SS (the combat branch of the SS) and participated in the Battle of France, Operation Barbarossa, and other engagements during World War II. Meyer commanded the 12th SS Panzer Division Hitlerjugend during the Allied invasion of Normandy, and was a recipient of the Knight's Cross of the Iron Cross with Oak Leaves and Swords.

After ordering the mass murder of civilians and prisoners of war (POWs) several times during the conflict, Meyer was convicted of war crimes for his role in the Ardenne Abbey massacre (the murder of Canadian POWs in Normandy). He was sentenced to death, but the sentence was later commuted to life in prison. Released in 1954, he subsequently became active in HIAG, a lobby group organised by former high-ranking Waffen-SS men. Meyer was a leading Waffen-SS apologist and HIAG's most effective spokesperson, depicting most of the Waffen-SS as apolitical, recklessly brave fighters who were not involved in the crimes of the Nazi regime. These notions have since been debunked by historians.

== Early life and SS career ==
=== Early life ===
Born in 1910 in Jerxheim, Meyer came from a lower-class working family. His father, a miner, joined the German Army in 1914 and was an NCO in World War I. Meyer began a business apprenticeship after completing elementary school, but became unemployed in 1928 and was forced to work as a handyman before becoming a policeman in Mecklenburg-Schwerin the following year.

Politically active at an early age and a fanatical supporter of Nazism, Meyer joined the Hitler Youth when he was fifteen, became a full member of the Nazi Party in September 1930, and joined the SS in October 1931. He was a guest at the marriage of Joseph Goebbels in December of that year. In May 1934, Meyer was transferred to the Leibstandarte SS Adolf Hitler (LSSAH). With this unit (which later became part of the Waffen-SS, the combat branch of the SS), Meyer took part in the annexation of Austria in 1938 and the 1939 occupation of Czechoslovakia.

=== Early World War II ===
At the outbreak of World War II, Meyer participated in the invasion of Poland with the LSSAH, serving as commander for an anti-tank company (namely 14. Panzerabwehrkompanie). He was awarded the Iron Cross, Second Class, on 20 September 1939. In October, Meyer allegedly ordered the shooting of fifty Polish Jews as a reprisal near Modlin and court-martialled a platoon commander who refused to carry out his instructions. (Note: Beevor, p. 181. Beevor cites Peter Lieb's Konventioneller Krieg oder NS-Weltanschauungskrieg?: Kriegführung und Partisanenbekämpfung in Frankreich 1943/44, p. 159 (2007), which refers to the findings of an Allied court of enquiry on war crimes in Normandy (TS 26/856, The National Archives). Part of this document (relating to the Modlin shootings) is summarised here.. Neither case was tried by the Canadian court (which restricted itself solely to cases related to Canadians), but Brode (p. 58) notes that the prosecution was aware of at least the Kharkov case and contemplated introducing it as additional background material. After Meyer's sentence was commuted to life imprisonment, the Soviet Union reportedly wanted to try him for the Kharkov case; however, nothing came of this (see Brode, p. 107).) He participated in the Battle of France and was awarded the Iron Cross, First Class.

Following the Battle of France, Meyer's company was reorganized into the LSSAH's reconnaissance battalion and he was promoted. Benito Mussolini's unsuccessful invasion of Greece prompted Germany to invade Yugoslavia and Greece in April 1941. During the invasion, the battalion came under fire from the Greek Army defending the Klisura Pass. After heavy fighting, Meyer's troops broke through the defensive lines; with the road now open, the German forces drove through to the Kastoria area to cut off retreating Greek and British Commonwealth forces. After the campaign, Meyer was awarded the Knight's Cross of the Iron Cross.

=== Eastern Front, and massacres of civilians ===
The LSSAH Division (including Meyer and his battalion) participated in Operation Barbarossa, the invasion of the Soviet Union, in June 1941 as part of Army Group South. He and his unit quickly became infamous even among the LSSAH Division for mass-murdering civilians and destroying entire villages, such as when they murdered about 20 women, children, and old men at Rowno. According to historian Jens Westemeier, Meyer was primarily responsible for the brutalization of the troops under his command. His terror tactics were regarded with approval by the Waffen-SS command. In combat against the Red Army, Meyer and his unit also achieved some military successes, while suffering the heaviest casualties among the LSSAH's battalions. He gained a reputation as an "audacious" leader during Operation Barbarossa, and was awarded the German Cross in Gold in 1942 while still with the LSSAH.

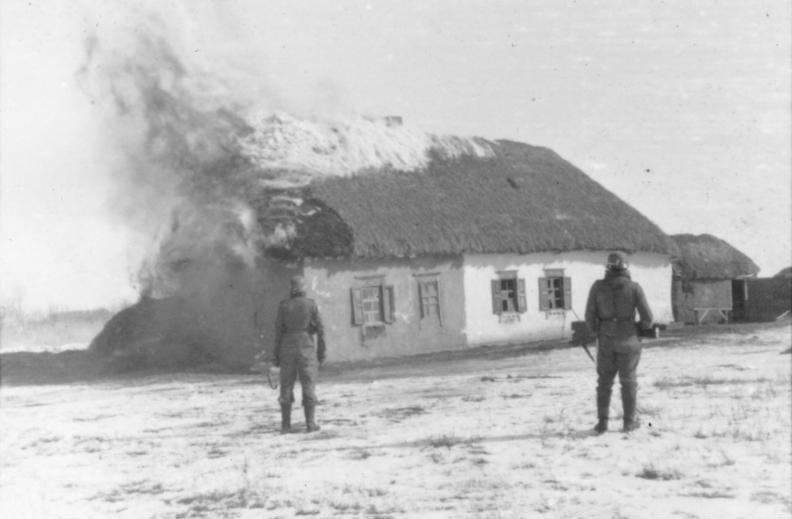
Waffen-SS soldiers stand in front of a burning farmer's house during the Third Battle of Kharkov. Meyer and his troops became infamous for killing civilians and destroying villages on the Eastern Front.

In early 1943, Meyer's reconnaissance battalion participated in the Third Battle of Kharkov. He reportedly ordered the destruction of a village during the fighting around Kharkov and the murder of all its inhabitants. Different accounts of the events exist, though they share a general outline. Meyer was awarded the Knight's Cross with Oak Leaves for a successful attack on the village of Yefremovka (Jefremowka) on 20 February 1943, where his forces took no prisoners and killed about 1500 Soviet soldiers. After the war, a former SS man described an incident which took place on Meyer's orders in Jefremowka in March 1943, following its occupation. Billeted in the village, the eyewitness heard a pistol shot at 10:30 in the morning. He ran to the door and saw an SS commander who demanded to see the company commander. When the latter arrived, the SS commander shouted: "On the orders of Meyer, this town is to be levelled to the ground, because this morning armed civilians attacked this locality." He then shot a 25-year-old woman who was cooking the German's lunch. According to the testimony, the Waffen-SS men killed all the inhabitants of the village and set fire to their homes.

Separate testimony from a former SS man (given to the Western Allies' interrogators after his capture in France in 1944) substantiates elements of the story:

The reconnaissance battalion of the LSSAH made an advance at the end of February [1943] towards the East and reached the village of Jefremowka. There they were surrounded by Russian forces. Fuel and ammo ran out and they were supplied by air until they were ordered to break through towards the West. Before trying to do so, the entire civilian population was shot and the village burnt to the ground. The battalion at that time was led by Kurt Meyer.

Ukrainian sources, including two surviving witnesses, reported that the killings took place on 17 February 1943. On 12 February, LSSAH troops had occupied two villages: Yefremovka and Semyonovka. Retreating Soviet forces had wounded two SS officers. In retaliation, LSSAH troops killed 872 men, women and children five days later; about 240 were burned alive in the church in Yefremovka. Russian sources reported that the massacre was perpetrated by the "Blowtorch Battalion", led by Jochen Peiper. Meyer continued to serve in the LSSAH until the summer of 1943, when he was appointed commander of a regiment of the newly-activated, still-forming SS Division Hitlerjugend stationed in France.

=== Battle of Normandy and Falaise pocket ===
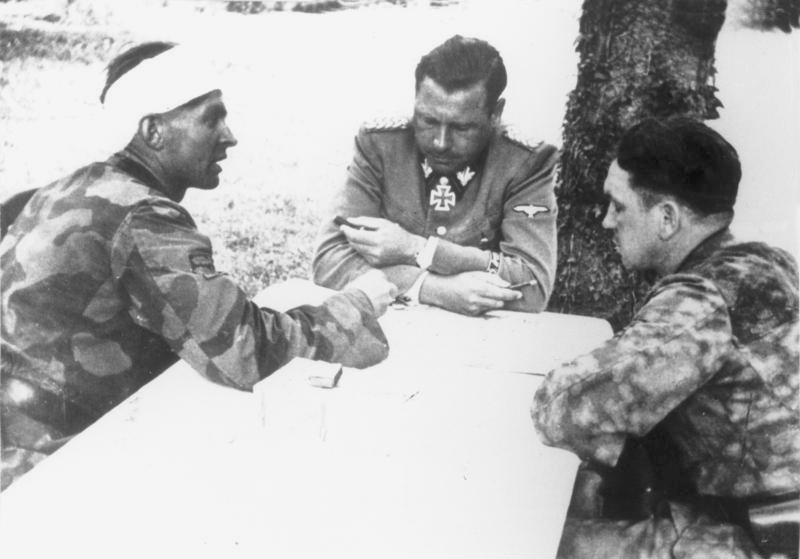
Max Wünsche (left), Fritz Witt (centre), and Meyer about 7–14 June 1944 near Caen, France

The Allies launched Operation Overlord, the amphibious invasion of France, on 6 June 1944. After much confusion, SS Division Hitlerjugend got moving at about 14:30; several units advanced towards one of the beaches on which the Allies had landed, until they were halted by naval and anti-tank fire and Allied air interdiction. Meyer, confident that the Allied forces were "little fishes", ordered his regiment to counterattack. The attack led to heavy casualties. The division was ordered to break through to the beach on 7 June, but Meyer instructed his regiment to take covering positions and await reinforcements. The Canadian Official History described Meyer's involvement in the battle:

Although Meyer claimed later that only shortage of petrol and ammunition prevented him from carrying the attack on towards the coast, this need not be taken seriously. Indeed, he himself testified that seeing from his lofty perch "enemy movements deeper in that area"—doubtless the advance of the main body of the 9th Brigade—he came down and rode his motorcycle to the 3rd Battalion to order its C.O. "not to continue the attack north of Buron". Meyer's 2nd Battalion had been drawn into the fight, north of St. Contest "in the direction of Galmanche". Fierce fighting was going on when Meyer visited the battalion in the early evening; just as he arrived the battalion commander's head was taken off by a tank shot ... Meyer ordered both this battalion and the 1st (around Cambes) to go "over from attack to defense."

By 22:00, Meyer had set up his command post in Ardenne Abbey. That evening, elements of the division under Meyer's command committed the Ardenne Abbey massacre; eleven Canadian prisoners of war, soldiers from the North Nova Scotia Highlanders and the 27th Armoured Regiment were shot in the back of the head.

On 14 June, divisional commander SS-Brigadeführer Fritz Witt was killed when a naval barrage hit his command post. Meyer, the next-highest-ranking officer, was promoted to divisional commander; at 33 years of age, he was one of the war's youngest German divisional commanders. According to historian Peter Lieb, Meyer's rise to division command was relatively typical for the Waffen-SS, as the latter desired individuals as commanders who were regarded as ruthless, brutal, and ready to serve at the front line. By 4 July, the division had been reduced to a weak battlegroup; six days later, it retreated behind the Orne River. In just over a month of fighting, the division had more than a 60 per cent casualty rate. Meyer's claimed that several of his men had tied explosives to themselves and jumped on Allied tanks during the Normandy Campaign.

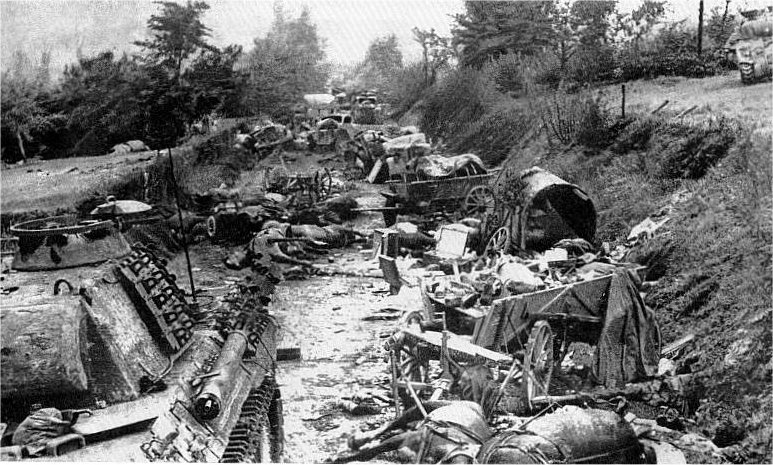
Destroyed German equipment in the Falaise Pocket

The Canadian forces began their advance on Falaise, planning to meet up with the Americans with the goal of encircling and destroying most of the German forces in Normandy. The Hitlerjugend division was holding the northern point of what became known as the Falaise pocket. After several days of fighting Meyer's unit was reduced to about 1,500 men, whom he led in an attempt to break out of the pocket. Meyer described the conditions in the pocket in his memoirs: "Concentrated in such a confined space, we offer unique targets for the enemy air power. [...] Death shadows us at every step". Meyer was wounded during the fight with the 3rd Canadian Division, but escaped from the Falaise pocket with the division's rearguard. The remnants of the division joined the retreat across the Seine and into Belgium. On 27 August, Meyer was awarded the Swords to the Knight's Cross with Oak Leaves and promoted to SS-Brigadeführer. He led his retreating unit as far as the Meuse, where he and his headquarters were ambushed by an American armoured column on 6 September. The division's staff fled into a nearby village, where Meyer and his driver hid in a barn. A farmer discovered them, and informed the Belgian resistance. Meyer surrendered to local partisans, who handed him over to the Americans on 7 September.

=== Prisoner of war ===
After his surrender, Meyer was initially hospitalized due to injuries he received from his American guards during an altercation. He was transferred to a POW camp near Compiègne in August and attempted to hide his SS affiliation, but his identity as a high-ranking SS officer was discovered in November. Meyer was then interned at Trent Park in England, where his conversations with other high-ranking prisoners of war were covertly tape-recorded by British military intelligence. He was frank about his Nazi-orientated political beliefs in these exchanges; Meyer had dedicated himself to its ideology, saying that a person "could only give his heart once in life". One interrogator described him as "the personification of National Socialism". Throughout the recordings, Meyer and other SS men confirmed the German armed forces officers' view of them as ideological fanatics with an almost religious belief in Nazism, the Third Reich, and the messianic personality cult of Adolf Hitler.

In a taped January 1945 conversation, Meyer praised Hitler for having inspired a "tremendous awakening in the German people" and for reviving their self-confidence. In a taped conversation the following month, he chided a demoralized Wehrmacht general: "I wish a lot of the officers here could command my division, so that they might learn some inkling of self-sacrifice and fanaticism". According to the recordings, Meyer had not just paid lip service to Nazi ideology to further his military career; he saw himself as an ideological racial warrior with a duty to indoctrinate his men with the National Socialist creed. Despite rigorous interrogations by British authorities, Meyer refused to admit any war crimes; his involvement in the Ardenne Abbey massacre was eventually revealed by imprisoned SS deserters.

== War crimes trial ==
Meyer was held as a prisoner of war until December 1945, when he was tried in the German town of Aurich for the murder of unarmed Allied prisoners of war in Normandy.

=== Indictment ===
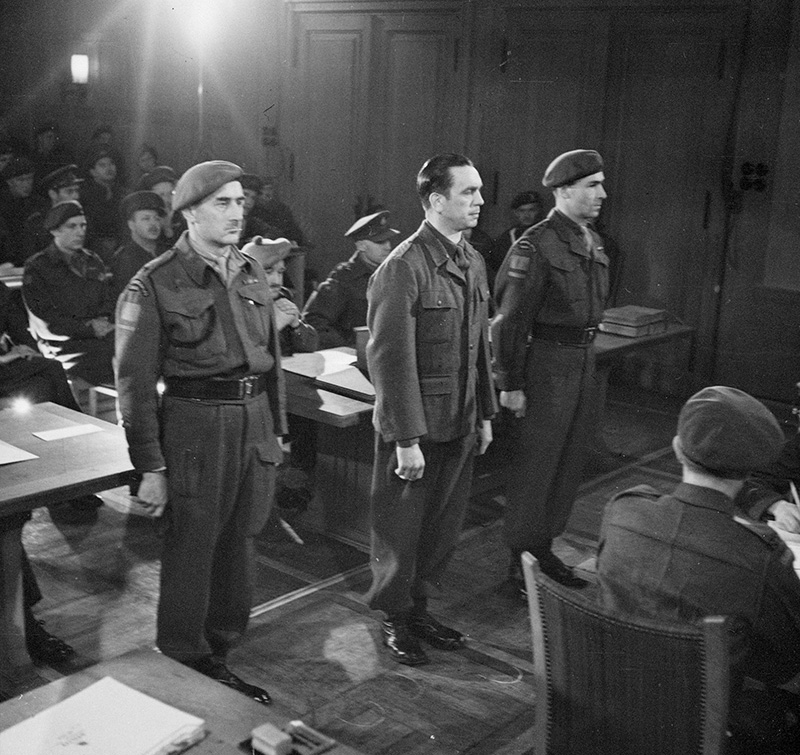
Meyer stands trial in Aurich, Germany, for five counts of war crimes in December 1945.

Meyer's charges were:

1. Prior to 7 June 1944, Meyer had incited troops under his command to deny quarter to surrendering Allied soldiers.
2. On or around 7 June 1944, Meyer was responsible for his troops killing twenty-three prisoners of war at Buron and Authie.
3. On or around 8 June 1944, Meyer ordered his troops to kill seven prisoners of war at his headquarters at the Abbaye Ardenne.
4. On or around 8 June 1944, Meyer was responsible for his troops killing seven prisoners of war, as above.
5. On or around 8 June 1944, Meyer was responsible for his troops killing eleven prisoners of war, as above.

The third and fourth charges referred to the same event; the fourth charge was an alternative to the third, if the killings were found to be a war crime but he was found not to have ordered them. The fifth charge was related to a separate group of prisoners; in this case, the prosecution did not allege that Meyer had directly ordered their deaths. He was charged with responsibility for the deaths of twenty-three prisoners on 7 June, and eighteen more the following day. Meyer pleaded not guilty to all five charges.

A second charge sheet accusing him of responsibility for the deaths of seven Canadian prisoners of war in Mouen on 8 June 1944 was prepared; after the successful conclusion of the first trial, however, it was decided not to try the second set of charges. No charges were laid against him for alleged previous war crimes in Poland or Ukraine; the Canadian court was constituted to deal only with crimes committed against Canadian nationals.

=== Proceedings ===
The court, the first major Canadian war-crimes trial, faced a number of problems before it could be convened. Chief among them was that since the accused was a general, he had to be tried by soldiers of equal rank; finding enough available Canadian generals was difficult. The court as eventually constituted had four brigadiers – one, Ian Johnston, was a lawyer in civilian life – and was presided over by Major General H. W. Foster, who had commanded the 7th Canadian Infantry Brigade in Normandy.

In accordance with eyewitness statements by German and Canadian soldiers and French civilians, Meyer was found guilty of the first, fourth and fifth charges and acquitted of the second and third; he was deemed responsible for inciting his troops to give no quarter to the enemy and for his troops' killing of eighteen prisoners at the Abbaye Ardenne, but not responsible for the killings of twenty-three at Buron and Authie. Meyer was found responsible for the deaths at the Abbaye Ardenne, but acquitted of directly ordering the killings. In Meyer's closing statement before sentencing, he did not ask for clemency but defended the record of his unit and the innocence of his soldiers: "By the Canadian Army I was treated as a soldier and ... the proceedings were fairly conducted".

Meyer’s case is notable as one of the earliest applications of the legal concept of command responsibility—accountability in personal terms for the actions of subordinates in violating the laws of war. The concept is now codified in the 1977 Additional Protocol I to the 1949 Geneva Conventions as well as the Canadian Crimes Against Humanity and War Crimes Act.

=== Sentence ===
Although most observers expected a long imprisonment – the court had not found him guilty of directly ordering the murders, but tacitly condoning them – the court sentenced Meyer to death by firing squad. One of the judges, Brigadier Bell-Irving, later said that he believed a guilty sentence required a death sentence and that no lesser sentence was permissible. The sentence was subject to confirmation by higher command; Meyer was originally willing to accept it, but was persuaded by his wife and his defence counsel to appeal. The appeal was reviewed by Canadian headquarters and dismissed by Major-General Christopher Vokes, the official convening authority for the court, who said that he could not see a clear way to mitigate the sentence imposed by the court.

Shortly before the sentence was to be carried out, however, the prosecutor realised that the trial regulations contained a section requiring a final review by "the senior combatant officer in the theatre" and no-one had completed such a review. The execution was postponed until it could be carried out. The senior officer was the commander of Canadian forces in Europe: Christopher Vokes, who had dismissed Meyer's appeal. Vokes had second thoughts and began a series of meetings with senior officials to discuss how to proceed. Vokes' main concern was the degree to which a commander should be held responsible for the actions of his men. The consensus which emerged from the discussions was that death was an appropriate sentence only when "the offence was conclusively shown to have resulted from the direct act of the commander or by his omission to act". Vokes said "There isn't a general or colonel on the Allied side that I know of who hasn't said, 'Well, this time we don't want any prisoners'". Vokes had himself ordered the razing of Friesoythe, a German town, in 1945, and had ordered the shooting of two prisoners in 1943 before his divisional commander intervened.

Meyer was scheduled to be shot on 7 January 1946. An execution site was selected and the firing party readied. Meyer initially refused to file for clemency, and he seemed to bitterly accept his upcoming death. "So, this is how my life will end," he said. "A volley will crack out in a sandpit somewhere and my body will disappear into a nameless grave." However, under pressure from his wife and lawyer, Meyer filed for clemency. He won a stay of execution on 5 January. On 14 January 1946, Vokes commuted Meyer's sentence to life imprisonment, saying he felt that Meyer's level of responsibility for the crimes did not warrant execution. After the reprieve, which sparked outrage amongst much of the Canadian public, a Communist-run German newspaper reported that the Soviet Union was considering putting Meyer on trial for war crimes allegedly committed at Kharkov. Nothing came of this, however, and Meyer was transported to Canada to begin his sentence in April 1946. He served five years at the Dorchester Penitentiary in New Brunswick, where he worked in the library and learned English.

Meyer petitioned for clemency in late 1950, offering to serve in a Canadian or United Nations military force if released. At the time, the new West German government was seeking the release of German war criminals incarcerated in Allied prisons, and the Canadian and other western Allied governments were looking to gain West German support for NATO to oppose possible Soviet aggression in Europe. The Canadian government was willing to let him return to a German prison, but not release him outright; he was transferred to a British military prison in Werl, West Germany, in 1951. Meyer was released from prison on 7 September 1954, after the Canadian government approved a reduction of his sentence to fourteen years. When he returned to Germany in 1951, he told a reporter that nationalism was past and that "a united Europe is now the only answer".

== HIAG activities and death ==
Meyer became active in HIAG, the Waffen-SS lobby group formed in 1951 by former high-ranking Waffen-SS men including Paul Hausser, Felix Steiner and Herbert Gille, when he was released from prison. He was a leading Waffen-SS apologist. Meyer announced at a 1957 HIAG rally that although he stood behind his old commanders, Hitler made many mistakes and it was time to look to the future rather than the past. He said to about 8,000 ex-SS men at the 1957 HIAG convention in Karlsberg, Bavaria, "SS troops committed no crimes, except the massacre at Oradour, and that was the action of a single man". According to Meyer, the Waffen-SS was "as much a regular army outfit as any other in the Wehrmacht".

Meyer's memoirs, Grenadiere (1957), were published as part of this campaign and were a glorification of the SS's part in the war and his role in it. The book, detailing Meyer's exploits at the front, was an element of Waffen-SS rehabilitation efforts. He condemned the "inhuman suffering" to which Waffen-SS personnel had been subjected "for crimes which they neither committed, nor were able to prevent". Historian Charles W. Sydnor called Grenadiere "perhaps the boldest and most truculent of the apologist works". The book was part of HIAG's campaign to promote the perception of the Waffen-SS in popular culture as apolitical, recklessly-brave fighters who were not involved in the war crimes of the Nazi regime, a perception which has since been refuted by historians. In July 1958, Meyer shook hands with SPD politician Ulrich Lohmar at a HIAG meeting. The event was widely discussed, with HIAG regarding it as good publicity. Many SPD members criticised Lohmar, saying that Meyer remained unapologetic about SS crimes and was an enemy of democracy despite his claims to the contrary.

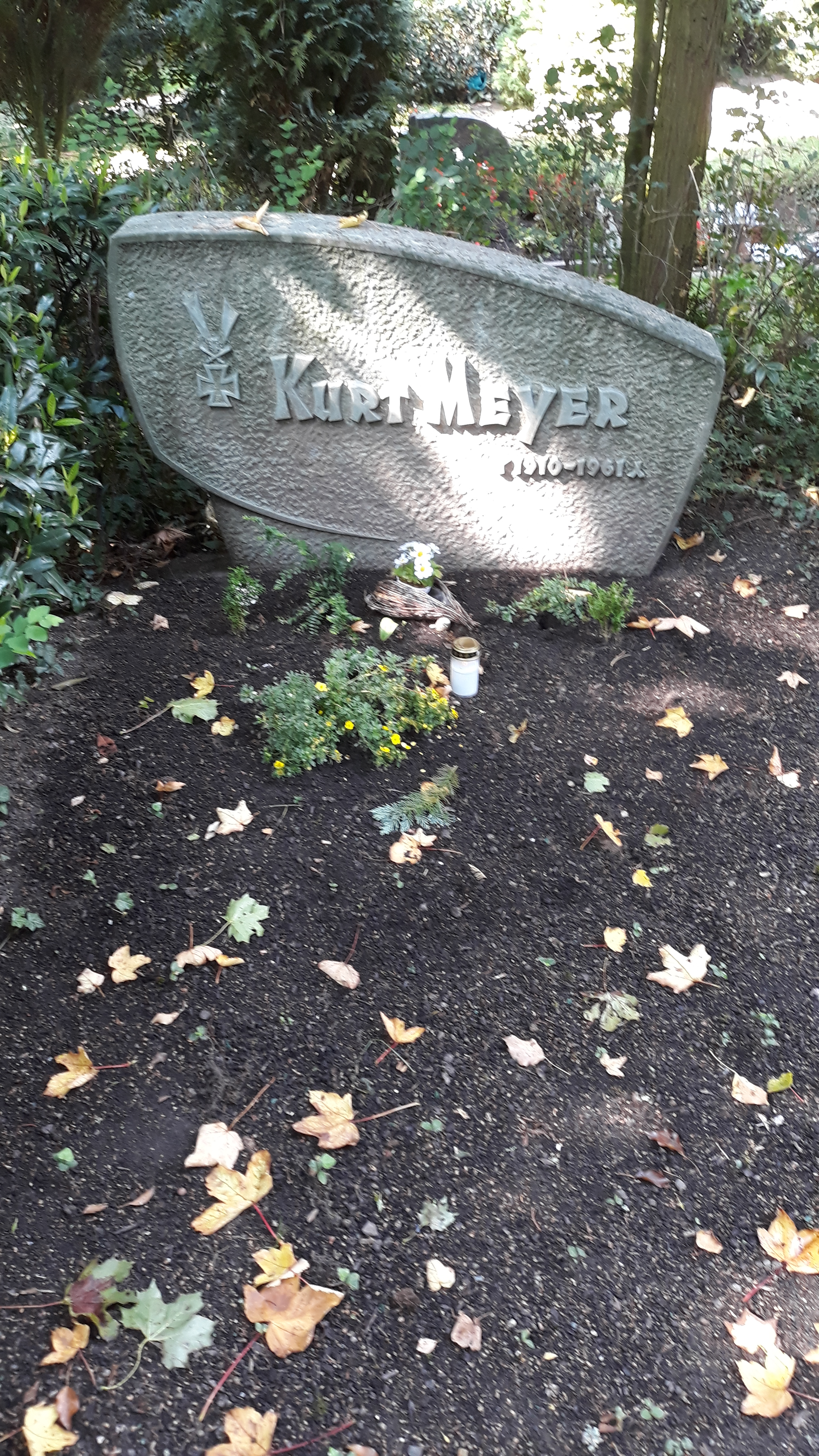
Meyer's grave in Hagen

One of HIAG's de facto leaders, Meyer was appointed the organization's spokesperson in 1959. He presented himself in this capacity as pragmatic and loyal to the West German state, and HIAG as an apolitical group. Even though elements of HIAG increasingly aligned with extreme right-wing groups such as the Deutsche Reichspartei (DRP), Meyer continued to push for a more moderate image in the public. In a television interview with the Canadian Broadcasting Corporation in January 1960, he even claimed that he would order Waffen-SS veterans to protect Jewish synagogues and graveyards if he could do so. This statement was met with severe criticism by many openly antisemitic members of HIAG, resulting in growing tensions in the organization. Meyer responded by dissolving the most extreme chapters of HIAG, and restructuring the group to solidify the control of its central leadership over the members. His tactics met with some success, and he met with numerous politicians to advocate for better treatment of former Waffen-SS members, convincing some that he and HIAG had distanced themselves from far-right extremism. He had less success in his 1959–1961 meetings with prominent SPD politician and former concentration camp inmate Fritz Erler. The latter was supposed to gauge Meyer's supposed conversion to democracy, as the SPD was prepared to support a moderate wing of HIAG to counteract more extreme elements of the group. Erler repeatedly confronted Meyer with the extreme right-wing rhetoric of many HIAG members and outlets, prompting the spokesman to shift all blame to his rivals in the lobby group. Meyer never fully convinced Erler of his position, but his meetings with him and other politicians still enabled HIAG to become more respected in the public and better spread its message. Regardless of his claims, Meyer always remained a covert, steadfast adherent of Nazism.

Meyer experienced poor health later in life, with heart and kidney disease and requiring the use of a cane. After a series of mild strokes, he died of a heart attack in Hagen, Westphalia, on 23 December 1961. Fifteen thousand people attended his funeral in Hagen, with the customary cushion-bearer carrying his medals in the cortege.

== Awards ==
- Iron Cross (1939)
  - 2nd Class (20 September 1939)
  - 1st Class (8 June 1940)
- German Cross in Gold on 8 February 1942 as SS-Sturmbannführer in SS-Division "Adolf Hitler"
- Knight's Cross of the Iron Cross with Oak Leaves and Swords
  - Knight's Cross on 18 May 1941 as SS-Sturmbannführer and commander of SS-Aufklärungs-Abteilung "Leibstandarte SS Adolf Hitler" (Note: According to Scherzer as commander of Aufklärungs-Abteilung "Leibstandarte SS Adolf Hitler".)
  - 195th Oak Leaves on 23 February 1943 as SS-Obersturmbannführer and commander of the SS-Aufklärungs-Abteilung "Leibstandarte SS Adolf Hitler"
  - 91st Swords on 27 August 1944 as SS-Standartenführer and commander of the SS Division Hitlerjugend

== Publications ==
- Meyer, Kurt (2005) [1957]. Grenadiers. Stackpole Military History Series. Stackpole Books. ISBN 978-0-8117-3197-3.

== Notes ==
Military offices
Preceded by SS-Brigadeführer Fritz Witt	Commander of 12th SS Panzer Division Hitlerjugend; 14 June 1944 – 6 September 1944	Succeeded by SS-Obersturmbannführer Hubert Meyer
