= Ardenne Abbey massacre =

1944 execution of Canadian POWs by German troops near Caen, France

Coordinates: 49°11′47″N 0°24′50″W

- Part of the Normandy massacres
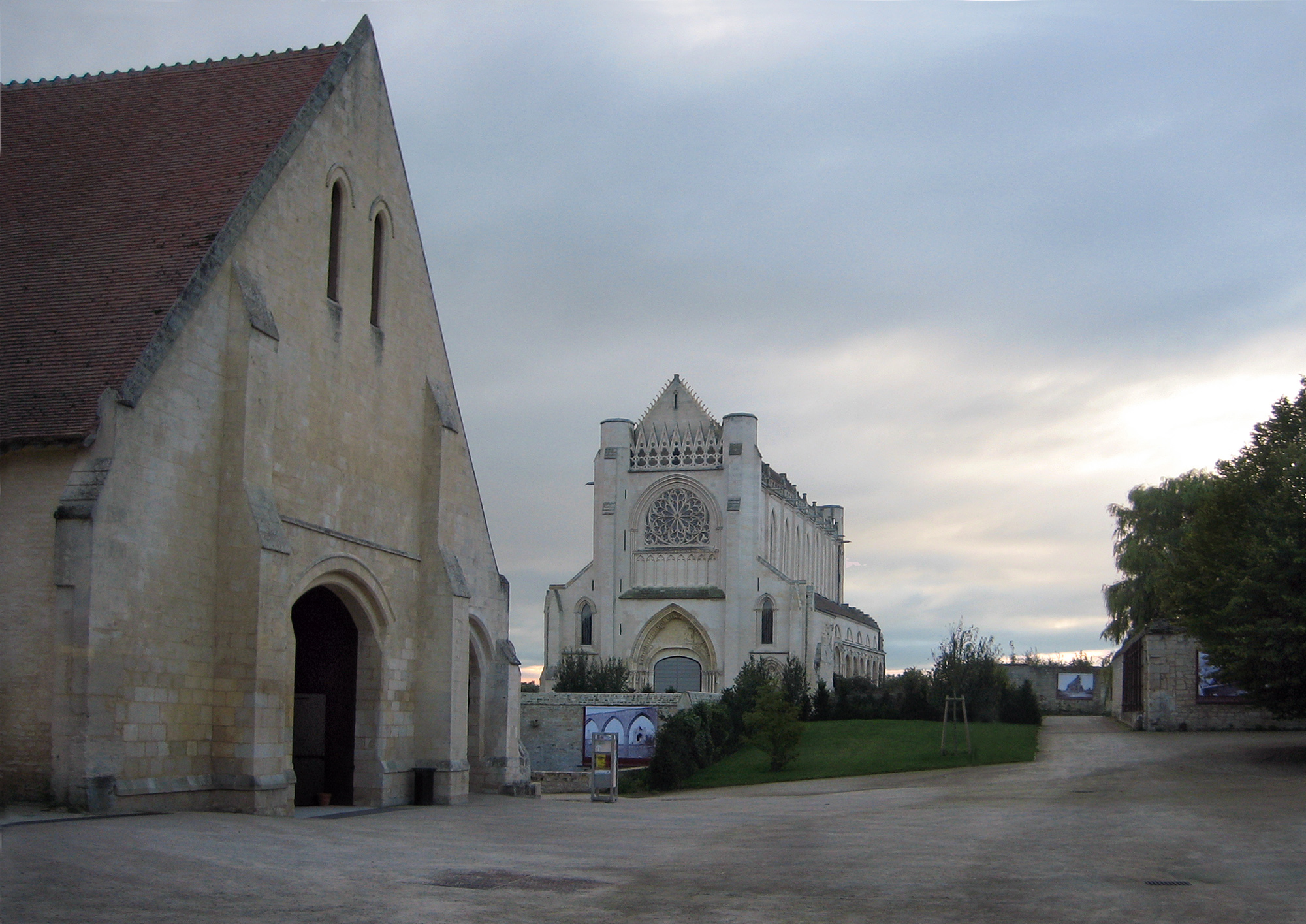
- Abbaye d'Ardenne in September 2006, after extensive restoration
- Location: Ardenne Abbey, Saint-Germain-la-Blanche-Herbe, France
- Date: 7–17 June 1944
- Deaths: 20 Canadians POWs from the North Nova Scotia Highlanders and the 27th Armoured Regiment (The Sherbrooke Fusilier Regiment)
- Perpetrator: 12th SS Panzer Division Hitlerjugend

The Ardenne Abbey massacre occurred during the Battle of Normandy at the Ardenne Abbey, a Premonstratensian monastery in Saint-Germain-la-Blanche-Herbe, near Caen, France. In June 1944, 20 Canadian soldiers were massacred in a garden at the abbey by members of the 12th SS Panzer Division Hitlerjugend over the course of several days and weeks. This was part of the Normandy Massacres, a series of scattered killings during which up to 156 Canadian prisoners of war were murdered by soldiers of the 12th SS Panzer Division during the Battle of Normandy. The perpetrators of the massacre, members of the 12th SS Panzer Division, were known for their fanaticism, the majority having been drawn from the Hitlerjugend (Hitler Youth).

== POW killings ==
During the Normandy Campaign, Waffen-SS Standartenführer Kurt Meyer, commander of the 12th SS Panzer Division Hitlerjugend, used the Abbaye d’Ardenne for his regimental headquarters, as its towers gave a clear view of the battlefield. In June 1944 at the abbey, 20 Canadian soldiers were murdered by members of the 12th SS Panzer Division.

Both the method by which the murders were carried out and upon whom the blame rests remain points of contention. Some basic facts, however, are certain. During the evening of 7 June, 11 Canadian prisoners of war, soldiers from the North Nova Scotia Highlanders and the 27th Armoured Regiment (The Sherbrooke Fusilier Regiment), were shot in the back of the head. This was a violation of the Geneva Conventions (of which Germany was a signatory) and therefore these actions constituted a war crime. Specifically the Geneva Convention pertaining to the Treatment of Prisoners of War stipulates in Part I: General Provisions - Art. 2. that POWS "are in the power of the hostile Government, but not of the individuals or formation which captured them. They shall at all times be humanely treated and protected, particularly against acts of violence, from insults and from public curiosity. Measures of reprisal against them are forbidden."

Of the North Nova Scotia Highlanders were:

- Private Ivan Crowe
- Private Charles Doucette
- Corporal Joseph MacIntyre
- Private Reginald Keeping
- Private James Moss

Of the 27th Armoured Regiment (The Sherbrooke Fusiliers Regiment) were:

- Trooper James Bolt
- Trooper George Gill
- Trooper Thomas Henry
- Trooper Roger Lockhead
- Trooper Harold Philp
- Lieutenant Thomas Windsor

The following day, 8 June, seven more POWs from the North Nova Scotia Highlanders were also murdered:

- Private Walter Doherty
- Private Hollis McKeil
- Private Hugh MacDonald
- Private George McNaughton
- Private George Millar
- Private Thomas Mont
- Private Raymond Moore

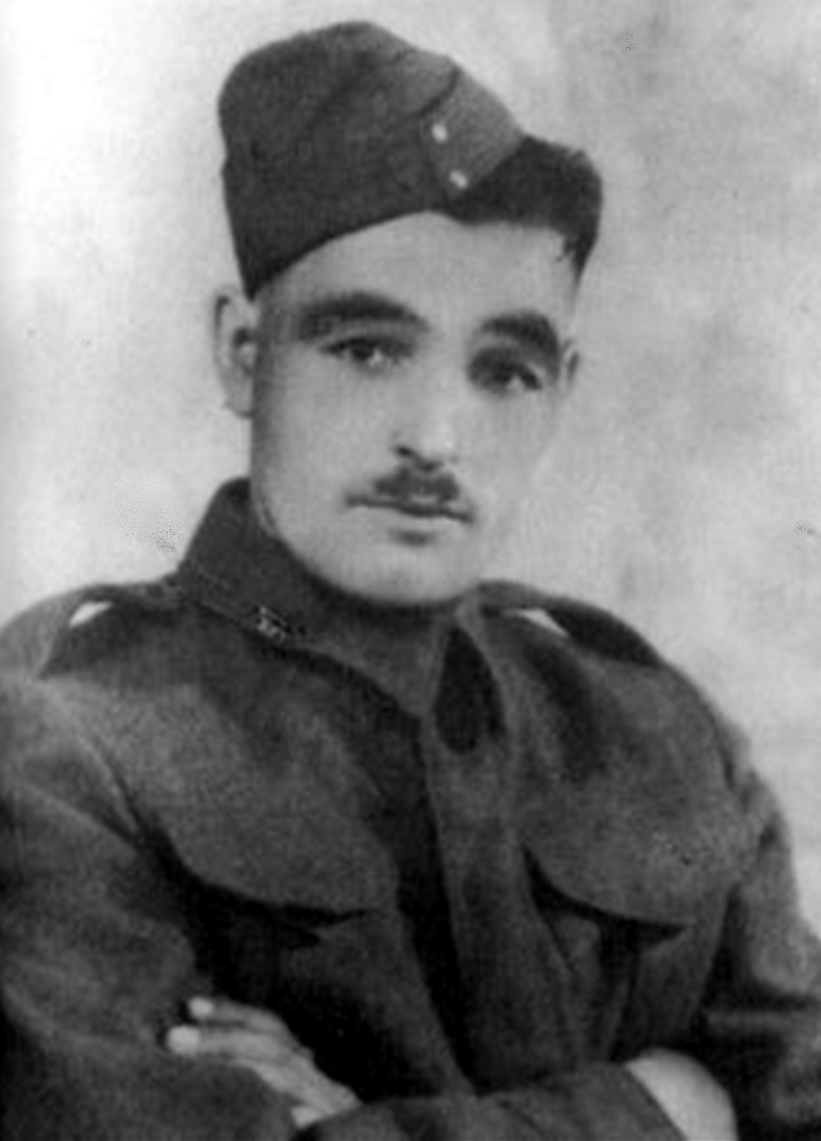
Private Charles Doucette

On 17 June, two more Canadian soldiers, Lieutenant Frederick Williams and Lance Corporal George Pollard, were also believed to have been killed at or around the Abbaye. Both soldiers "had been patrolling for disabled German tanks near Buron and went missing. It is known that two wounded Canadian POWs were evacuated by the Germans to the abbey's first-aid post on June 17. Witnesses later reported hearing shots in the vicinity of the abbey at two different times that day."

After liberating the Abbaye d’Ardenne on 8 July, members of the Regina Rifle Regiment discovered the body of Lieutenant Williams; Lance Corporal Pollard was never found. The bodies of those killed on 7 and 8 June were not found until the winter and spring of 1945, when inhabitants from the abbey accidentally discovered remains throughout the premises. Examinations of the remains revealed that the soldiers had either been shot or bludgeoned directly in the head; the exact weapon used to bludgeon the heads of the soldiers was indeterminate but was most likely the butt of a rifle or an entrenching tool. All the remains were taken to the cemeteries at Beny-sur-Mer or Bretteville-sur-Laize, except for Private McKeil, who was taken to Ryes War Cemetery, Bazenville.

== War crimes trial ==
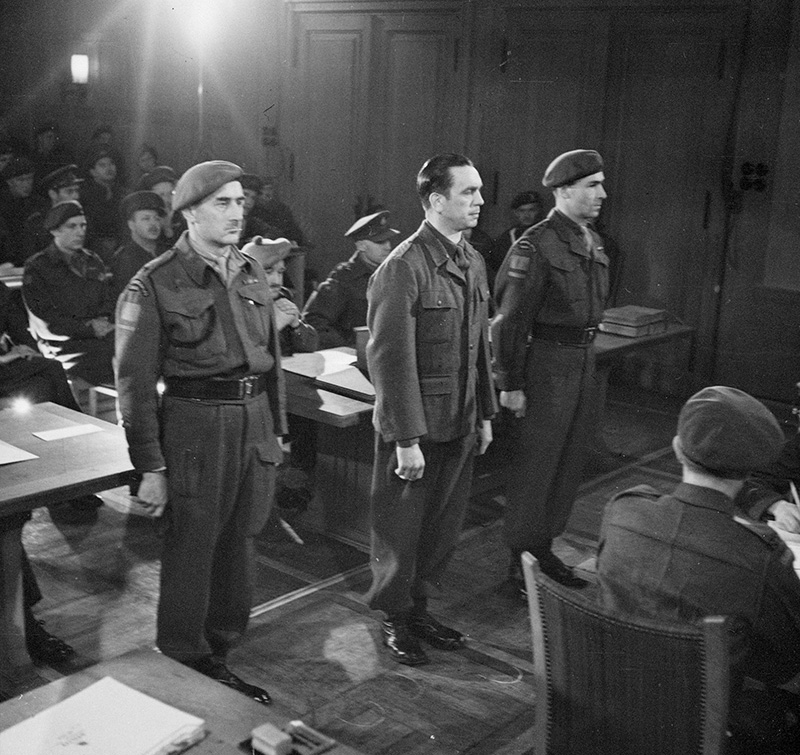
Kurt Meyer stands trial in Aurich, Germany for 5 counts of war crimes in December 1945

Over the course of a year of investigation, from August 1944 to August 1945, the Canadian War Crimes Commission (CWCC), led by Lieutenant-Colonel Bruce MacDonald, strove to discover the details of the murders and who bore the responsibility. As commander of the regiment that was responsible for the massacre, Kurt Meyer remained the prime suspect and believed to be responsible for the actions of his men. At Meyer's war crimes trial in December 1945, the incident at the Abbaye formed the core of the charges. In total, five charges were laid against him:

1. Inciting and advising soldiers under his command to refuse quarter to Allied troops. 2. Commanding his troops to kill 23 POWs at or near the villages of Buron and Authie on 7 June 1944. 3. Commanding his troops, on 8 June 1944, to kill seven prisoners of war at the Abbaye d’Ardenne, as a result of which the prisoners were shot and killed. 4. (Alternative to third charge) Responsibility for the killing of seven Canadian POWs at the Abbaye d'Ardenne on 8 June 1944. 5. Ordering the killing of 11 Canadian POWs at the Abbaye Ardenne on 7 June 1944.

Former SS Private Alfred Helzel was the prosecution's first major witness. While in prison in Quebec, Helzel revealed that in June 1944 Meyer had directed his troops to take no prisoners. On the stand, however, Helzel denied that Meyer made such a declaration. Macdonald eventually managed to have Helzel verify his original statement, thus helping to establish Meyer's guilt.

Citizens of the towns of Authie and Buron testified against the 12th SS and confirmed various atrocities committed against Canadian soldiers. Canadian soldiers themselves testified, the most important being Sergeant Stanley Dudka. He maintained that his column of prisoners arrived at the Abbaye Ardenne on 7 June, after which military police demanded 10 volunteers step forward. Since no one volunteered, 10 men were randomly taken, including Private Moss, later identified as one of the men executed at the Abbaye.

The prosecution's central witness, however, was Polish soldier Jan Jesionek (who had been pressed into service in the 12th SS). At the Abbaye on 8 June 1944, Jesionek was approached by two SS troopers who were escorting seven Canadian prisoners, and watched as the POWs were directed into a stall adjoining the Abbaye. One of the troopers asked for the regimental commander, whereby Jesionek led him to Kurt Meyer. In response to learning of the seven prisoners, Meyer reportedly said: ‘What should we do with these prisoners; they only eat up our rations?’ Afterwards, he turned to one of the officers, spoke softly so that others could not hear, and then announced: ‘In the future, no more prisoners are to be taken.’ Jesionek then saw each prisoner questioned by the officer to whom Meyer had spoken. A name was called out, a prisoner walked up from the passageway leading to the garden in the Abbaye. As soon as the prisoner turned, the officer shot him in the head with a machine pistol; this was repeated for the remaining six prisoners. After the officer and guards left, Jesionek and three fellow drivers examined the bodies, all lying in the garden and surrounded by blood. According to Jesionek, the Canadians realized what was happening, each prisoner shaking hands with his comrades before walking to the garden and being shot. Uncertainty over Meyer's commands remained since Jesionek never heard Meyer give the order to kill the Canadians.

Meyer originally claimed to have had no knowledge of the murders at the Abbaye. He later insisted, however, that he was aware of the bodies’ presence but had not seen them until two days after the killings. Disgusted, Meyer apparently ordered for the burial of the bodies and the admonishment, albeit unsuccessfully, of those responsible. These claims were refuted by French teenagers, however, who lived in the Abbaye and testified that no bodies were visible in the garden when they went there the day after the murders. Throughout the trial, Meyer maintained that he never commanded his troops not to take prisoners.

Meyer was found guilty of inciting his troops to commit murder and of being responsible as a commander for the killings at the Abbaye; he was acquitted on the second and third charges. Sentenced to death on 28 December 1945, his sentence was commuted to life imprisonment on 14 January 1946. After serving nearly nine years in prison, Meyer was released on 7 September 1954.

== Memorial ==
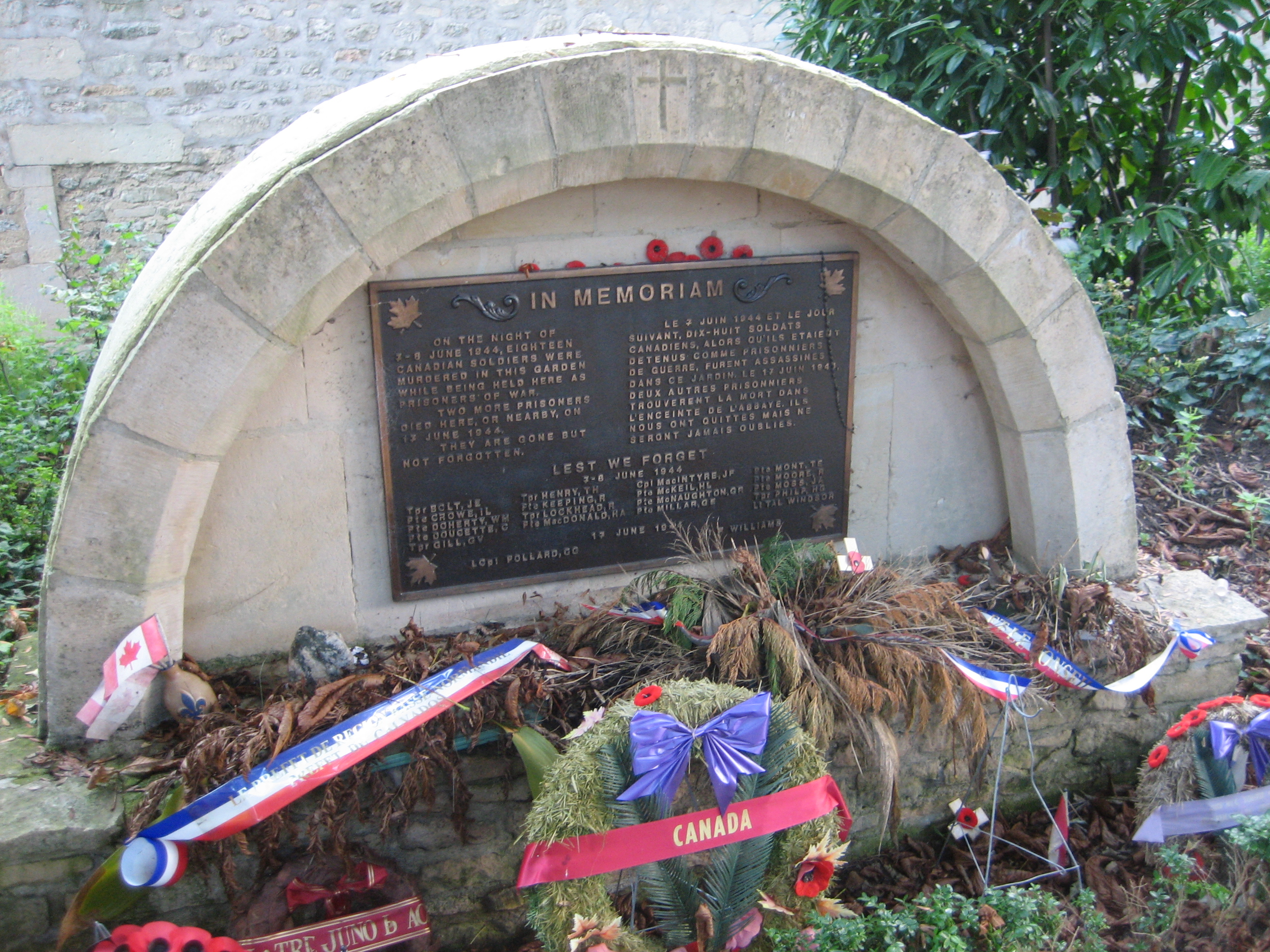
The memorial to the 20 Canadian soldiers killed by SS in the Abbey garden.

A memorial was unveiled in the garden of the Abbaye on 6 June 1984. After the names of those murdered, an inscription reads:

On the night of June 7/8, 1944, 18 Canadian soldiers were murdered in this garden while being held here as prisoners of war. Two more prisoners died here or nearby on June 17. They are gone but not forgotten."

== See also ==
- France during World War II
- Canada in World War II
