= William James Russell =

English chemist (1830–1909)

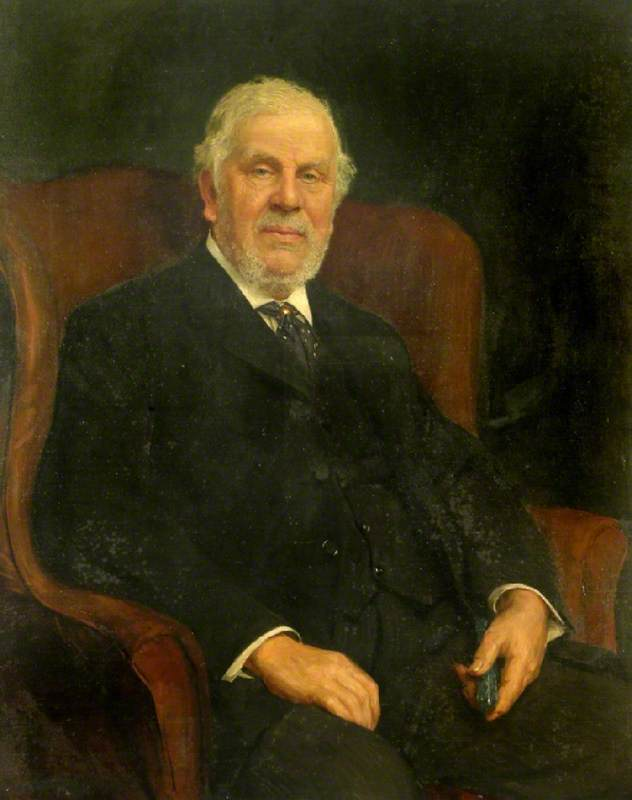
William James Russell by Herbert Arnould Olivier

William James Russell (1830–1909) was an English chemist and Fellow of the Royal Society.

== Life ==
Born in Gloucester on 20 May 1830, he was son of Thomas Rougher Russell (1775–1851), a banker there, and grandson of William Russell of Birmingham; his mother was Mary Skey (1790–1877), fourth daughter of Col. James Skey. Educated at schools at Bristol and Birmingham, he entered University College, London, in 1847, studying chemistry under Thomas Graham and Alexander William Williamson.

For two years a demonstrator at Owens College, Manchester under Edward Frankland (1851–3), Russell moved on to Heidelberg University, becoming a pupil of Robert Bunsen and graduating Ph.D. in 1855. In 1857 he became assistant to Williamson and carried out researches on the analysis of gases. From 1868 to 1870 he was lecturer in chemistry at the medical school of St. Mary's Hospital, London, and subsequently (1870–97) held a similar post at St. Bartholomew's Hospital. He was (1860–70) professor of natural philosophy at Bedford College, London, and in later life was chairman of its council.

A long-time member of the Chemical Society, Russell became its president 1889–91. Elected Fellow of the Royal Society on 6 June 1872, he was Bakerian lecturer in 1898. One of the founders of the Institute of Chemistry, he was president 1894–7. He died at Ringwood on 12 November 1909.

== Works ==
The results of Russell's work on gases were communicated to the Chemical Society, and in Henry Watts's Dictionary of Chemistry he wrote the article on "Gas Analysis" (1868). He made an extended study of the formation of London's fog.

Other investigations were the determination of the atomic weights of cobalt and nickel; memoirs on absorption spectra; and papers on the action of wood and other substances on a photographic plate in darkness.

== Family ==
Russell married in 1862 Fanny, daughter of Abraham Follett Osler. They had a son, and a daughter Agnes Mary who married Alexander Scott.
