= William Russell (merchant) =

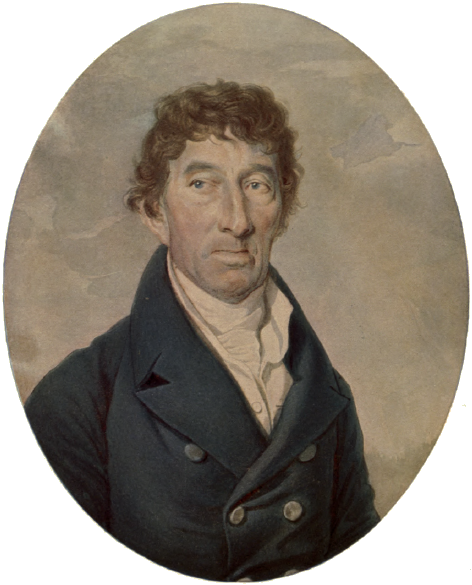
- Water colour of Russell
- Born: 11 November 1740; Birmingham, England
- Died: 26 January 1818 (aged 77); Upton-upon-Severn, Worcestershire, England

William Russell (11 November 1740 – 26 January 1818) was a Unitarian Birmingham merchant and a close friend and sponsor of Joseph Priestley. He promoted and defended Rational Christianity. Russell helped lead the agitation for the repeal of penal laws against English Dissenters and canvassed support for a political union of the Dissenters.

== Life ==
William Russell was the eldest of three brothers, Thomas and George, who variously inherited the family's extensive trading interests. His great grandfather, Thomas Russell, had been a Birmingham ironmaster, whilst his grandfather William had expanded into North America, acquiring iron deposits, furnaces and forges in Maryland and Virginia. His father, Thomas (1696–1760), had diversified into thread-making and skinning, businesses that William inherited. Following his marriage to Martha Twamley in September 1762, he invested in a leather business in Worcester in partnership with Henry Beesley, and in 1772 set up the shipping company Respondentia, with Thomas and Nathaniel Jefferys. A thousand-pound investment in this latter concern, including interests in the East Indiamen Norfolk and Grattan, yielded a profit of £630 in the first year alone. In 1775 he formed a partnership with John Finch, dealing in textiles, metals and metal products with Sweden, Holland and Russia.

William and Martha had five children, Martha, Mary, Frances, Thomas Pougher, and Jane. Jane died an infant, and Frances died in 1785 after a long illness. Russell's wife was killed in a coach accident in 1790, during a family holiday in Yorkshire. The Russells lived well but not extravagantly in a farmhouse at Showell Green in modern-day Balsall Heath, Birmingham. Russell employed two labourers to run the farm and stables, but took a personal interest in stock-breeding, a subject on which he corresponded with George Washington, America's first president. As one of Birmingham's leading citizens, Russell's advice and support was sought for many of the important commercial, civic and social causes of the day. He was a subscriber and committee member for the town Hospital and the Birmingham Humane Society. In 1787, he was appointed one of the Wardens of the Birmingham Assay Office, supporting Matthew Boulton in recommending the introduction in Britain of standards of silver lower than sterling silver (9 oz. and 10 oz. per pound Troy). Russell was also a Justice of the Peace for the county of Worcestershire, his house in Showell Green being just inside the Worcestershire border.

== Philanthropy ==
Russell responded generously and constructively to the needs of those in distress, never courting publicity but always "more concerned to be good than to appear so". He financed the teaching of poor children, paid a local surgeon to care for poor families in the neighbourhood, and contributed to schemes to provide food for the poorest of his neighbours. Throughout his life, many families, "sufferers by fire" and "persons stricken with illness" were supported by his bounty. During the American War for Independence, Russell bought food, clothes and shoes to ease the distress of American prisoners of war.

When Russell's house was targeted for destruction in the 1791 Priestley Riots, his poor and illiterate neighbours came to his aid, some calming and dissuading roadside rioters.

== Views on education ==
As a Rational Christian, Russell valued education. He paid local clergymen to teach poor boys to read and write, helped support the Birmingham Library and its offshoot Scientific Library, and sponsored scientific lectures. He subscribed to schools in Coseley, Oldbury, Hall Green and Birmingham, and to Warrington Academy and the New College at Hackney, as well as numerous Sunday Schools in the West Midlands. Like his grandfather and father before him, he was a governor of King Edward's School, Birmingham. He joined the committee of London's 'Presbyterian University', the New College at Hackney, in May 1790. When the college faced bankruptcy with debts of two thousand pounds because of over-expansion and poor supervision of the builders, he dashed to London to add his support, chairing a subcommittee appointed to "reduce household expenses". In 1790, he backed Priestley's scheme for a Birmingham Sunday Society, where youngsters who had passed through a basic Sunday school were taught arithmetic, book-keeping, geography and drawing, as well as the elements of natural and revealed religion, by teachers drawn from Priestley's Senior Class. As well as a major subscriber to the Unitarian New Meeting in Birmingham, acting as Secretary to the committee of subscribers from 1771 to 1793, Russell subscribed to a host of chapels up and down the country, including Theophilus Lindsey's Essex Street Chapel, and supported a number of dissenting ministers.

It was only through Russell's whole-hearted leadership and practical support, that within a few weeks of becoming co-pastor of New Meeting Birmingham, Priestley was able to establish a new scheme of catechetical classes, appointing elders to assist him; introduce lectures on natural and revealed religion to a Senior Class; and start a Congregational Library. Agreeing with Priestley that the promulgation of a Rational Christianity was the best way of reconverting unbelievers, Russell financed several editions of Priestley's Appeal. When this prompted a vitriolic response from the Anglicans, Russell encouraged Priestley to write the anonymous Melanchton to Martin Luther.

For years, Russell had voiced his anger at the way Dissenting clergy were treated by Church of England ministers. Things came to a head at his mother's funeral in 1767, at St Philip's Church, now St Philip's Cathedral, Birmingham, when one of the curates refused either to ride in the same carriage as the two Presbyterian ministers, or to allow the Presbyterian ministers to walk in front of the coffin. Thus, used to attacking such Anglican bigotry, Russell sprang to Priestley's defence when Anglican clergy contrived a series of acrimonious disputes in regard to the management of the Birmingham Library. Likewise, he encouraged and supported Priestley during the acerbic pamphlet war that accompanied the campaign for the repeal of the Test Acts.

== Test and Corporation Acts ==
With the revival of the movement for repeal in 1787, Russell threw himself zealously into the cause of political liberty. Though this was not always their effect in practice, the Test and Corporation Acts were intended to limit public office to practising Anglicans, and came to be seen as an essential bulwark of the union between church and state. Writing to the Warwickshire MP, Sir Robert Lawley, to solicit his support on the Dissenters' behalf, Russell tried to assure him that the Dissenters' object was "entirely of a civil nature, and ... can neither diminish, nor interfere with, the provision which the legislature has made for the established church." "We are not attacking the rights of others", he added, "but merely endeavouring to recover our own."

Believing that the Dissenters could only be an effective political force if they presented a united front on common issues, Russell led moves to draw the united strength of the Dissenters together. As a first step, he persuaded representatives of the various Baptist, Independent and Presbyterian congregations to attend a meeting at Dadley's hotel, Birmingham on 14 October 1789. The result was the formation of the Committee of the Seven Congregations of the Three Denominations of Dissenters, chaired by Russell himself. The committee, with Russell's financial backing, undertook the publication and distribution of a number of works on religious liberty, including two volumes of Extracts, substantially edited by Russell.

== Uniting Protestant dissenters ==
Russell now sought a union of Protestant Dissenters throughout the land, proposing a four-tier 'Plan of Union', by which Congregations in towns and counties would send deputies to Town and County Meetings of Deputies. These in turn would unite in Provincial Meetings, which would send deputies to a National Meeting in London. The Protestant Dissenting Deputies in London, initially rejected Russell's suggestion of a National Meeting. Countrywide support, prompted by Russell's vigorous canvassing, led the London Deputies to meet with country delegates, to discuss the issue. As a result, on 13 May 1790 the London Dissenting Deputies passed a resolution that a Standing Committee of "delegates from different parts of the kingdom be appointed to meet in London".

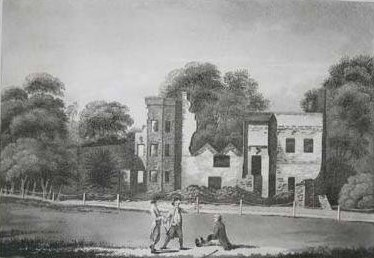
William Russell's home, Showell Green, Sparkhill after its destruction. (Etching by William Ellis, after a drawing by P. H. Witton)

The Birmingham Committee had consistently gone further than the London Dissenting Deputies in calling for the repeal of all penal legislation against Dissenters, including the act against non-Trinitarians. Now, Russell called together on 13 January 1790, a meeting in Leicester of "Deputies of Protestant Dissenters of the Three Denominations within the Midland District". Echoing the resolutions of the Birmingham Committee, the Midland District meeting issued a sweeping condemnation of all penal statutes against Dissenters. Russell was appointed secretary and treasurer of the executive committee.

Following the failure of the third application for the repeal of the Test Acts, Russell and Priestley sought parliamentary reform as the most effectual means of achieving equal citizenship. To this end, he developed plans for a Warwickshire Constitutional Society. The society was to have been launched at a dinner in Birmingham on 14 July 1791, but the hostility that developed in Birmingham in the days leading up to the dinner caused the abandonment of the plan. The dinner itself was followed by the infamous riots, in which Russell's house was destroyed along with Priestley's. Russell sought temporary refuge in London where he had an interview with the Prime Minister, William Pitt the Younger. He returned to Birmingham a few weeks later, but found the town so divided by sectarian disputes that by 1794 he decided to take his three children to America.

Russell's zest for controversy never left him. In 1800, defending Priestley's publication of Letters to the inhabitants of Northumberland, he wrote: "I have a greater zeal than ever, for such controversies as our good friends the late Dr. Price and Dr. Priestley have set the world an example of. By such means the world has been enlightened and I know it is more likely to promote knowledge and enlarge the mind." Russell was not a political radical; although he subscribed to the formation of the Society for Constitutional Information, he did not remain a member.

== Emigration to America ==
The family set sail from Falmouth in an American ship Mary on 14 August 1794, four months after Priestley. Four days after weighing anchor, their ship was intercepted by the French frigate Proserpine, to which the Russells with other British citizens were forced to transfer. The Mary's captain Prebble, stayed with them to give what support he could. After being transferred to three different accommodation ships, they finally went ashore at Brest on 26 December, and a few days later travelled to Paris, where they stayed six months. The Russells eventually set sail for America aboard the Nancy on 3 July 1795, landing at New York on 19 August.

The Russells settled at Philadelphia, renting a house at 319 High Street. It was here that Priestley stayed the following spring, whilst giving a series of lectures on the evidences of Christianity, at the Universalist chapel in Lombard Street. During this time an interested group of English expatriates met with Priestley, seeking his advice in planning the formation of a Unitarian society. They first acquired the use of a room at the University of Pennsylvania, and on 21 August 1796 formally organised themselves as The Society of Unitarian Christians in Philadelphia, the first Unitarian congregation in the New World. Russell was one of the twenty-one founder members, and for a while acted as their treasurer.

== Return to France ==
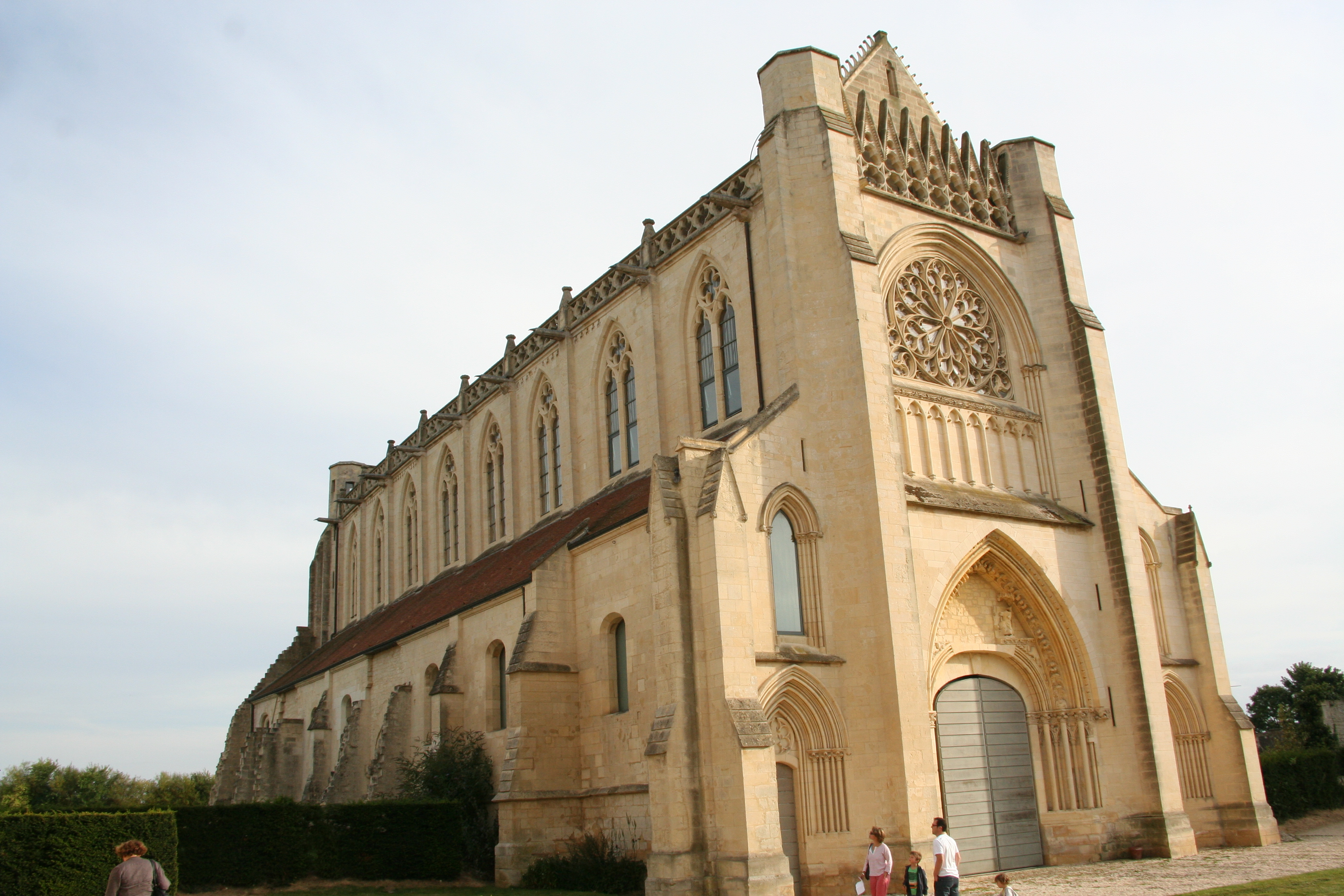
Ardenne Abbey

A political breach between America and France in 1797 made life difficult for French émigrés in America, and for men such as Russell and Priestley who were thought to support the French. Russell decided to leave America in 1801, intending to spend a month in France before returning to England. He and Priestley had planned to establish a Unitarian church in Paris and promote the cause of Unitarianism throughout France. But, though Russell hoped to the last that his friend would join him, Priestley decided to stay in America. Russell arrived in Paris in July 1801, to find the French government negotiating with the Vatican. It was not a time for Protestants to rock the boat, and Russell was advised to postpone his plans for a Unitarian church at Paris. Instead, he formed an association for translating and publishing books "to promote Rational Christianity". But even this was objected to, and was suspended. To add to his problems, Russell was warned that he would face arrest if he returned to England. In 1795, while in Paris, waiting to travel on to America, he had advanced a loan to Fulwar Skipwith, the American consul. The loan not being repaid, in February 1799, Skipwith conveyed through Russell's agent, Mr. Walker, a house in Paris on the Quai Voltaire, and an estate in Normandy, the Ardenne Abbey, at St Germain la Blanche Herbe, on the Bayeux road, four kilometres from Caen. Although no money had changed hands at the time, and Russell himself was 3000 miles away and knew nothing of the transaction, technically he had purchased property in a country with which Britain was at war. Furthermore, having offended the government by his "perseverance in endeavouring to establish a bond of union among Dissenters, and to support the plan for District Meetings, &c.," he could not expect a dispensation. So, in August, Russell decided to settle on his Normandy estate. Here he wrote several Letters in French to introduce the ideas of Rational Christianity. The front sheet containing an exhortation to search the scriptures, and to use the liberty they now enjoyed of exchanging superstition for genuine Christianity. Russell sent his letters to John Hurford Stone, at Paris, to edit and print, but Stone advised against publication, "at least for the present". Rather than "flying Pamphlets", Stone suggested a larger more systematic work addressed to the "philosophical part of the Nation". Stone suggested translating Priestley's History of the Corruptions of Christianity. Russell enthusiastically agreed, later financing the publication of French translations of Priestley's Institutes of Religion, and Alexander Geddes' Apology for the Catholics, and, in 1805, an edition of the Geneva Bible.

In the meantime, Russell had been busy trying to establish a Unitarian church at Caen. The Protestant pastor, M. Fontbonne du Vernet, who had gone into seven years hiding during the Terror, was now holding services in a room in the rue de Bras, but few attended. Russell was outraged. Independent Catholics met regularly for worship, in substantial numbers. Even Roman Catholics, although their meetings were technically illegal, assembled openly. For the Protestants, there seemed "no other obstacle to this great duty of assembling for Public Worship, than what arose from criminal fear or indifference". With du Vernet's encouragement, Russell approached the Prefect of the department to request a church to assemble in at Caen. This was refused, but Russell was permitted to open the small church on his property at the Ardenne Abbey. Russell repaired, and refurnished the church, and, despite Stone's advice against it, the first service was held there early in October 1801. It was the first Protestant church to open anywhere in France, since the revolution. The church was soon overflowing, Russell reported, the congregation "worshipping with an apparent fervor that roused emotions in my breast, which I cannot describe". In 1802, a new Concordat with the Vatican had eased religious tensions, and by November 1803, the congregation was able to move to a larger, former Benedictine chapel in rue de Geôle at Caen. Russell contributed 120 livres a year for the remainder of his stay in France.

Catholic priests frequently applied to him for support in relieving the sufferings of the afflicted and distressed. To these applications he always lent a patient ear, displaying the most generous sympathy. "I love all mankind", he wrote, "and I see no reason why diversity of opinion should alienate one man from another". His help to the poor was regular and extensive, particularly during the winter bread shortages, and earned him the accolade le père des pauvres. His generosity to the people of Normandy continued even after his return to England. On 15 May 1807 he was accorded French citizenship, swearing the oath of loyalty to the empire, a month later.

Following Napoleon Bonaparte's internment on Elba, the political situation enabled Russell to return to his homeland at the end of 1814. He spent his remaining few years at his son-in-law's home near Upton-upon-Severn, writing devotional addresses and hymns, some of which were published after his death in 1818. He was buried next to his wife at St Philip's Church, Birmingham.

== See also ==
- William James Russell (1830–1909), chemist
