= 12th SS Panzer Division Hitlerjugend =

German armored division

SS Panzer Division "Hitlerjugend"
- 12. SS-Panzerdivision "Hitlerjugend"
- Unit insignia
- Active: 1943–1945
- Disbanded: May 7, 1945
- Country: Nazi Germany
- Branch: (Schutzstaffel) Waffen-SS
- Type: Panzer
- Role: Armoured warfare
- Size: Division; 1 November 1943: 14,030; 1 June 1944: 20,540; 22 August 1944: 12,000; 1 November 1944: 21,219; 1 February 1945: 19,961; 25 April 1945: 6,828
- Part of: I SS Panzer Corps
- Nickname: "Baby Division" or "SS-Kinderdivision"
- Patron: Artur Axmann
- Engagements: World War II; Battle of Le Mesnil-Patry; Battle of Caen; Battle of the Bulge; Falaise pocket; Operation Spring Awakening

Commanders
- Notable commanders: Fritz Witt; Kurt Meyer; Hugo Kraas

The SS Division "Hitlerjugend" or 12th SS Panzer Division "Hitlerjugend" (German: 12. SS-Panzerdivision "Hitlerjugend") was a German armoured division of the Waffen-SS during World War II.

The division was founded in 1943; it drew the majority of its junior enlisted men from members of the Hitler Youth, while the senior NCOs and officers were from other Waffen-SS divisions. Most of the enlisted men were teenagers, starting from the ages of 16 or even 15.

The division was sent to Normandy in response to the Allied invasion of France in June 1944. It was put immediately into combat on 7 June 1944 as part of the German defensive operations at Caen against British and Canadian forces. In the retreat from Normandy it suffered great casualties during the Battle of the Falaise Pocket.

In December 1944, the division was committed against the US Army in the Ardennes offensive. After the operation's failure, which became known as the Battle of the Bulge, the division was sent to Hungary to participate in fighting around Budapest. The division eventually retreated into Austria and surrendered to the 7th US Army on 8 May 1945.

The division committed several war crimes while en route to and during the early battles of the Allied Normandy landings, including the Ascq and Normandy massacres, and several massacres, arsons and rapes in the cities of Plomion, Tavaux, Bouillon, Godinne, Hun, Rivere, Warnant and Namur. After the war several members of the division, including its former commander Kurt Meyer, were convicted of war crimes.

== Formation and training ==
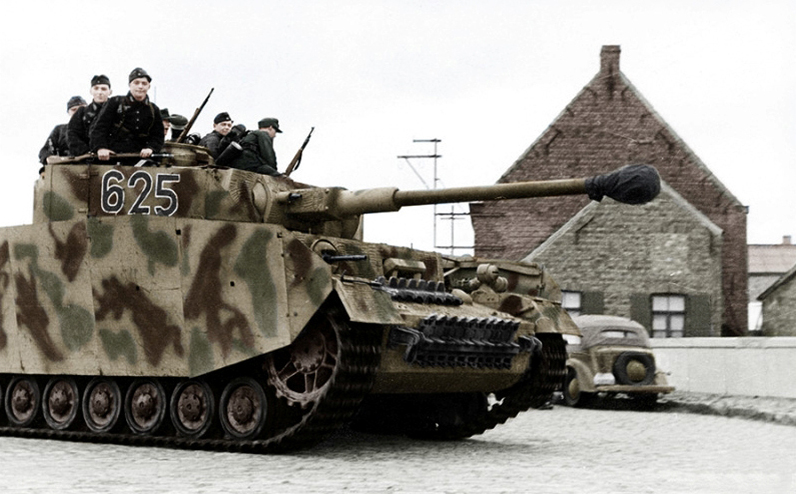
Panzergrenadiers on a Panzer IV during training 1943.

The idea for the Waffen-SS division was first proposed by Artur Axmann, the leader of the Hitler Youth, to Reichsführer-SS Heinrich Himmler in early 1943. The plan for a division made up of Hitler Youth members born in 1926 was passed on to Adolf Hitler for his approval. Hitler approved the plan in February and SS-Gruppenführer Gottlob Berger was ordered to recruit the personnel. SS-Oberführer Fritz Witt of 1st SS Panzer Division Leibstandarte SS Adolf Hitler (LSSAH) was appointed the divisional commander. Personnel from the LSSAH provided the regimental, battalion and most of the company commanders for the division.

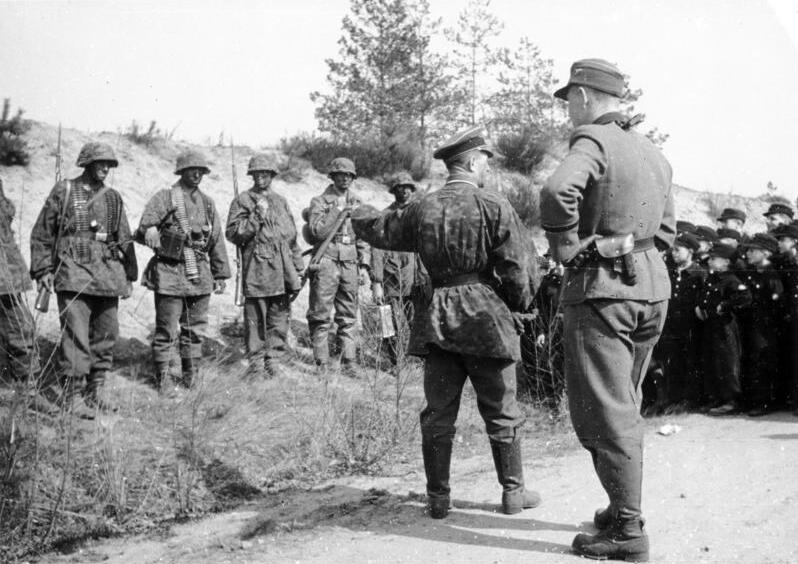
Soldiers of the 12th SS, Training in Beverloo.

About 2,000 personnel were transferred from the LSSAH and in September 1943, the division had over 16,000 recruits on its roster, undergoing training in Beverloo Camp in Leopoldsburg, Belgium. The indoctrination was often brutal; while in Allied captivity, an SS man from the division recalled: "In the Waffen-SS you couldn't do anything if an Unterfuhrer hit you during the training. The purpose of the training is to make you just as they are; it's pure sadism".

In March 1944 the 12th SS was attached to the I SS Panzer Corps and transferred to Caen in Normandy. At the beginning of June, the division had over 150 tanks.

== Ascq massacre ==
The division committed its first massacre while en route to Normandy. The division executed 86 French men on 1 April 1944 in Ascq, France, in a reprisal against the civilian population after the railway they were on was sabotaged. The commander of the convoy, SS-Obersturmführer Walter Hauck, ordered troops to search and arrest all male members of the houses on both sides of the track. Altogether, 70 men were shot beside the railway line and another 16 killed in the village. In 1949, Hauck was put on trial in Lille, France, and was sentenced to death. His sentence was later commuted to life imprisonment. He was freed in 1957 after a further sentence reduction.

== Normandy ==
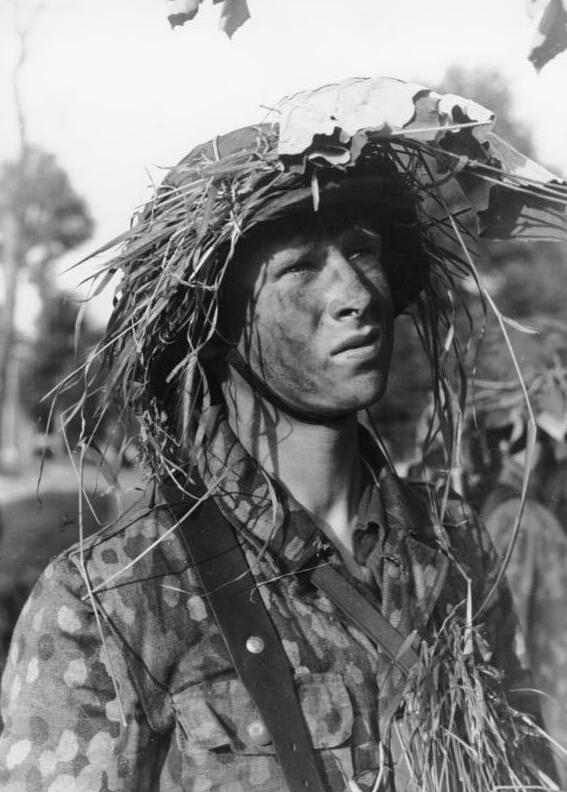
Division's trooper in Erbsenmuster (Pea dot pattern) camouflage, 21 June 1944

On 6 June 1944, the division, along with the 21st Panzer Division, were the closest Panzer divisions to the landing beaches but they were unable to move until ordered by the Oberkommando der Wehrmacht (OKW, armed forces high command). Initially placed under LXXXI Infantry Corps It was only ordered to the front at 14:30 hours on 6 June, over twelve hours after the first reports of the landings. Prior to this Field Marshal Gerd von Rundstedt had ordered over half of the division (the 25th and 26th Panzergrenadier regiments) to deal with a parachute landing on the coast near Lisieux which was found to be dummies dropped by Operation Titanic specifically to confuse and draw off German forces. It was placed under the 1st SS Panzer Corps and ordered to Carpiquet to the west of Caen, about 50 miles away.

The division's advance to the areas near the British–Canadian landing beaches of Sword and Juno proceeded slowly due to Allied air attacks slowing them to 4 miles per hour preventing their intervention in the first day of the landings. The first units of the 12th SS reached their assembly area near Evrecy at 22:00 hours on 6 June but the Panther tank battalion ran out of fuel east of the Orne River. According to Marc Milner, "[t]his was just the first example of sloppy staff work and command and control that characterized 12th SS Division's experience in the beachhead battles".

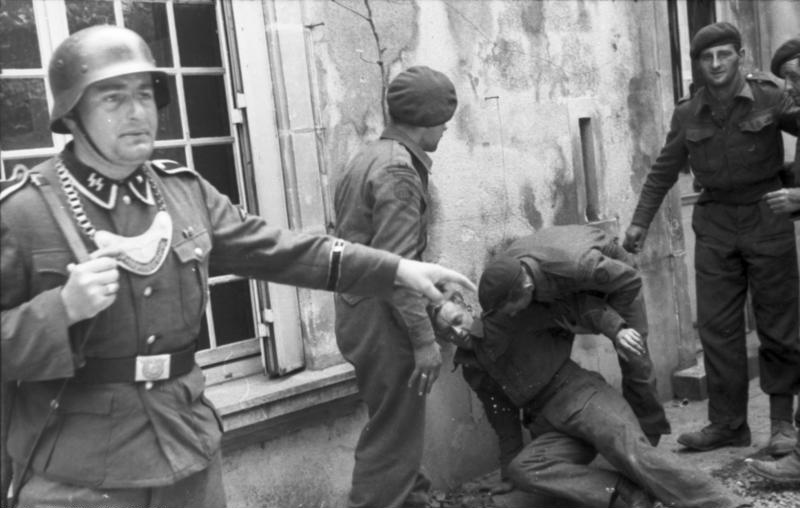
British POWs captured by the division, 21 June 1944

At 10:00 hours on 7 June, the 25th SS Panzergrenadier Regiment, along with 50 Panzer IV tanks of the 12th SS Panzer Regiment, arrived and moved into position north-west of Caen. Supported by a battalion of artillery (3rd Battalion, 12th SS Panzer Regiment), this battle group was ordered to stop the Canadian advance and drive through to the coast, a few kilometres away. When the 9th Canadian Brigade was spotted moving across their front, Meyer ordered an attack. The Canadians were forced back two miles and the III Battalion took Buron, the other Battalions made similar gains. At that point Allied artillery intervened - both field artillery and gunfire from battleships at sea - and the German advance slowed and stopped.

They failed to break through the Canadians around Buron, a kilometre to the north. Meyer countermanded the divisional commander's order on his own initiative, his flanks were exposed and enemy armoured units were appearing, feeling that objective unrealistic and hoped merely to stop the flow of Canadian units inland until the situation could be stabilized.

The attack by the division was supposed to have been supported by the 21st Panzer Division but they could not disengage from fighting the British 3rd Infantry Division and were still at Couvre. Casualties of the 25th SS Panzergrenadier Regiment amounted to about 300 men and 15 tanks from the 12th SS Panzer Regiment were destroyed. Late on 7 June, the 26th SS Panzergrenadier Regiment under command of SS-Obersturmbannfuhrer Wilhelm Mohnke arrived on the battlefield. Meyer had pushed back one part of the Canadian advance but to the west, the 7th Canadian Infantry Brigade had occupied a group of small villages three kilometres into the German line. The 26th Panzergrenadier Regiment crossed behind Meyer's regiment and took post to the west. The 1st Battalion launched an attack towards Norrey-en-Bessin, defended by the Regina Rifles, 7th Canadian Infantry Brigade, 3rd Canadian Division. Their orders were to overrun the Canadians and force a deep wedge between them and the British to the west. No reconnaissance of the Canadian positions was done and the infantry met intense defensive fire from firmly established positions.

Rommel ordered the 1st SS Panzer Corps (Hitlerjugend, Panzer Lehr and 21st Panzer divisions) to attack between Caen and Bayeux, though the other divisions were not ready for a coordinated attack; 21st was still engaged, Panzerlehr was not formed up after travelling to the front. This left the 12th to carry out a more limited operation and within the division Mohnke ’s battlegroup was low on fuel and Meyer's battlegroup were not recovered from the previous day.

The attack at 03:30 hours on 8 June had little initial success. The various companies in the attacking battalion failed to coordinate effectively and suffered many casualties. Facing Canadian artillery and the supporting heavy machine guns of the Cameron Highlanders of Ottawa, the 1st Battalion of the 12th SS was forced to fall back. Despite their losses, the Regina Rifles stood their ground. The Hitlerjugend division was criticized for performing inadequately in the opening days of the Normandy campaign, with the Canadian Brigadier, Harry Foster, later noting that "no use was made of the fact that the Reginas' flanks were exposed; instead, the enemy flung himself straight against the strongest points and utterly failed to exploit the undoubted weakness of his opponent's position". On the Canadian right, the 2nd Battalion attacked the Royal Winnipeg Rifles defending the village of Putot-en-Bessin at 06:30 hours. The battalion managed to break into the village and surround several companies, pushing the Winnipeg Rifles out of the village by 13:00 hours and inflicting 256 casualties – of which 175 were taken prisoner. Later that day, a counter-attack by the Canadian Scottish Regiment, with artillery, tank and tank-destroyer support, re-took Putot with the SS giving up the struggle for the village and withdrawing around midnight. Oliver Haller concluded that "It is evident that the 12th SS was not capable of conducting successful offensive operations against prepared positions in Normandy. Artillery and anti-tank guns were the key to victory, and the Allies possessed large numbers of these effective weapons. (Note: The 3rd Canadian division had been reinforced with additional artillery and anti-tank guns in expectation of German counter attack) All of the German assaults were checked and defeated in detail. The 3rd Canadian Division had won a decisive victory".

Following the failures,the division was placed under Panzer Group West (Geyr von Schweppenburg) who was believed to be more able than 1st SS Panzer Corps' Sepp

Dietrich . Panzer Group West order the division onto the defence while it planned a new offensive for evening of 10 June. This was frustrated by the Allies own offensive intended to sweep west of Caen and take ground to the south. This struck the centre of Panzer Lehr Division. That day Panzer Group West's HQ was attacked destroying the command organisation and all plans for counteroffensive postponed, the division passed back to 1st SS Panzer Corps control.

The 3rd Canadian Division ceased major combat operations until July, with only one day of major operations, on 11 June, at the Battle of Le Mesnil-Patry. This saw the 12th SS inflict many casualties on the Queen's Own Rifles of Canada and the 1st Hussars (6th Armoured Regiment) which lost 51 Sherman tanks.

Also on 11 June the No. 46 (Royal Marine) Commando supported by 10th Armoured Regiment cleared woods at Cairon and Rosel before attacking Le Hamel (defended by a company of 26th PGR) and Rots (just to the north of Carpiquet). The town was held - but not yet cleared - by dusk. The official historian of Le Régiment de la Chaudière, which followed them into the town, described the aftermath of the "ferocious battle" including hand-to-hand fighting and "a German and a Canadian tank have engaged each other to destruction and are still smouldering, and from each blackened turret hangs the charred corpse of a machine gunner".

The following two weeks was a period of relative quiet, with insufficient troops in Normandy to hold a line behind which the panzer forces could form the mobile reserve, and further infantry weeks away in Scandinavia or Germany the division was put into defensive covering between Cristot and Cambes. At the same time, the opposing 21st Army Group could not maintain offensive operations along the whole Anglo-Canadian front. What did not stop was the constant Allied artillery, naval bombardment and air attacks. Constant fighter-bomber activity during the day confined any movement to the cover of darkness. Allied artillery directed by spotter aircraft which could operated unhindered over the battlefield was brought down on German positions. Daily losses mounted reducing the front line component to 2,000 by 20 June. Bad weather gave a temporary respite from Allied aircraft from 19 to 22 June

The 12th SS Panzer Regiment and the 101st SS Heavy Tank Battalion were sent to the west to aid Panzer Lehr on 25 June. The following day the British launched Operation Epsom intended to move west around Caen, across the Odon and take the high ground around Bretteville-sur-Laize At the end of the day, the division had been pushed back about three miles. With reinforcements not due until 28 June, the division had to make do. The British forced a bridgehead over the Odon, with only a thin line of troops remaining, Meyer hurriedly sent tanks to hold Hill 112 and prevent the British reaching the Orne but the attack paused before night. Reinforcements from 1 SS Panzer Division and II SS Panzer Corp arrived that night and the division was directed to hold a shorter line from Verson to Cambes - about 8 miles long. Elements of the division were still engaged on the following morning during heavy fighting around Hill 112. The division was able to hold back a much larger British attack but was much reduced to the strength of a single battlegroup. The much reduced division was now placed for the next major Allied attack; intending Canadian 8th Infantry Brigade to take Carpiquet then three British divisions to assault Caen directly. Facing the Canadians was about 200 soldiers of the 1 battalion, 26th Panzergrenadier Regiment with a few dug in tanks and artillery support. Against the main thrust was the 25th Panzergrenadier Regiment with the 16th Luftwaffe Field Division to the east.

Army Group D reported on 9 July that the division was now the size of a single battalion, a fraction of its authorized strength, having taken about 4,500 casualties, and lost half its tanks, assault guns and armoured personnel carriers since 9 June. The division was withdrawn to reserve at Potigny where its fighting element was built up by drawing on its administrative personnel and a replacement battalion and then it was split into battlegroup Krause and battlegroup Waldmüller. It was ordered north-east on 16 July to be a reserve for Fifteenth Army and was en route on 18 July when Operation Goodwood - intended to keep German forces engaged around Caen leaving the American forces in the west to breakout - was launched. Late in the afternoon the division was ordered back to Caen arriving the following morning in time to block Guards Armoured Division.

The American forces started breaking out and rather than withdraw to a defensible line on the Seine, Hitler ordered a large armoured attack to force the Americans back. Panzers were taken from around Caen.

Major operations for both sides began again in July, including Operation Windsor and Operation Charnwood.

During Charnwood, the division was driven from its positions in Buron and nearby villages of Gruchy and Cussy and the divisional command post in the Ardenne Abbey, which had been occupied since before D-Day, was lost. Witt was killed in action by a Royal Navy naval artillery barrage which hit the divisional command post at Venoix on 14 June 1944 and Kurt Meyer was placed in command of the division.

On 4/5 August the division was relieved by 272 Infantry Division and moved to the Caen-Falaise highway where it was reinforced by the 101st SS Heavy Tank Battalion. On 7 August battlegroup Krause (25th Pgr) and battalion of Panzer IV was ordered to assist a counterattack at Thury-Harcourt. This coincided with start of Operation Totalize a nighttime attack with Canadian and Scottish infantry carried forward in armoured vehicles supported by intense bombing on the flanks. German line was broken in places

In August, the division was involved in the fighting around Falaise against the Polish 1st Armoured Division battlegroups who were trying to close the Falaise Pocket. Hitler wanted to use the division for Operation Lüttich, but Günther von Kluge declined for fear of an allied advance in this region. The 12th SS, along with several other German units and panzer ace SS-Oberscharführer Rudolf Roy who destroyed 26 Allied tanks, was instrumental in re-opening the corridor out of the pocket on 20 August, allowing an estimated 10,000 German soldiers to escape encirclement.

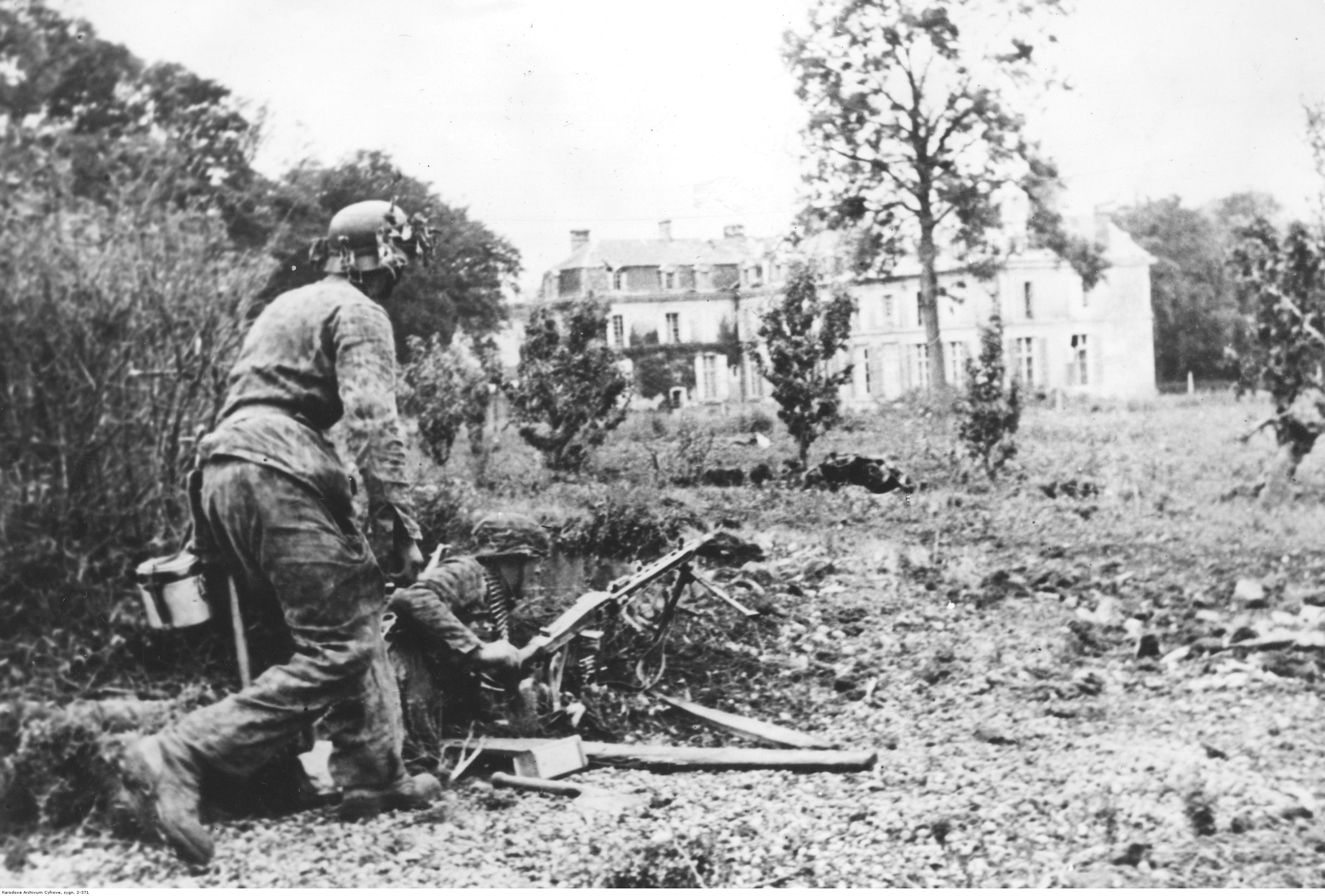
Two men of the division in July 1944 near Normandy

During their retreat from France, members of the LSSAH and the Hitlerjugend division murdered 34 French civilians in the towns of Tavaux and Plomion. The units in the division that were not fit for combat were ordered to return to Germany on 8 September, leaving behind a small Kampfgruppe attached to the SS Division Das Reich. The division losses during the fighting in Normandy, in the three months from June to September, amounted to c. 8,000 men, over 80 per cent of its tanks, 70 per cent of its armored vehicles, 60 per cent of its artillery and 50 per cent of its motor vehicles.

== Ardenne Abbey massacre ==
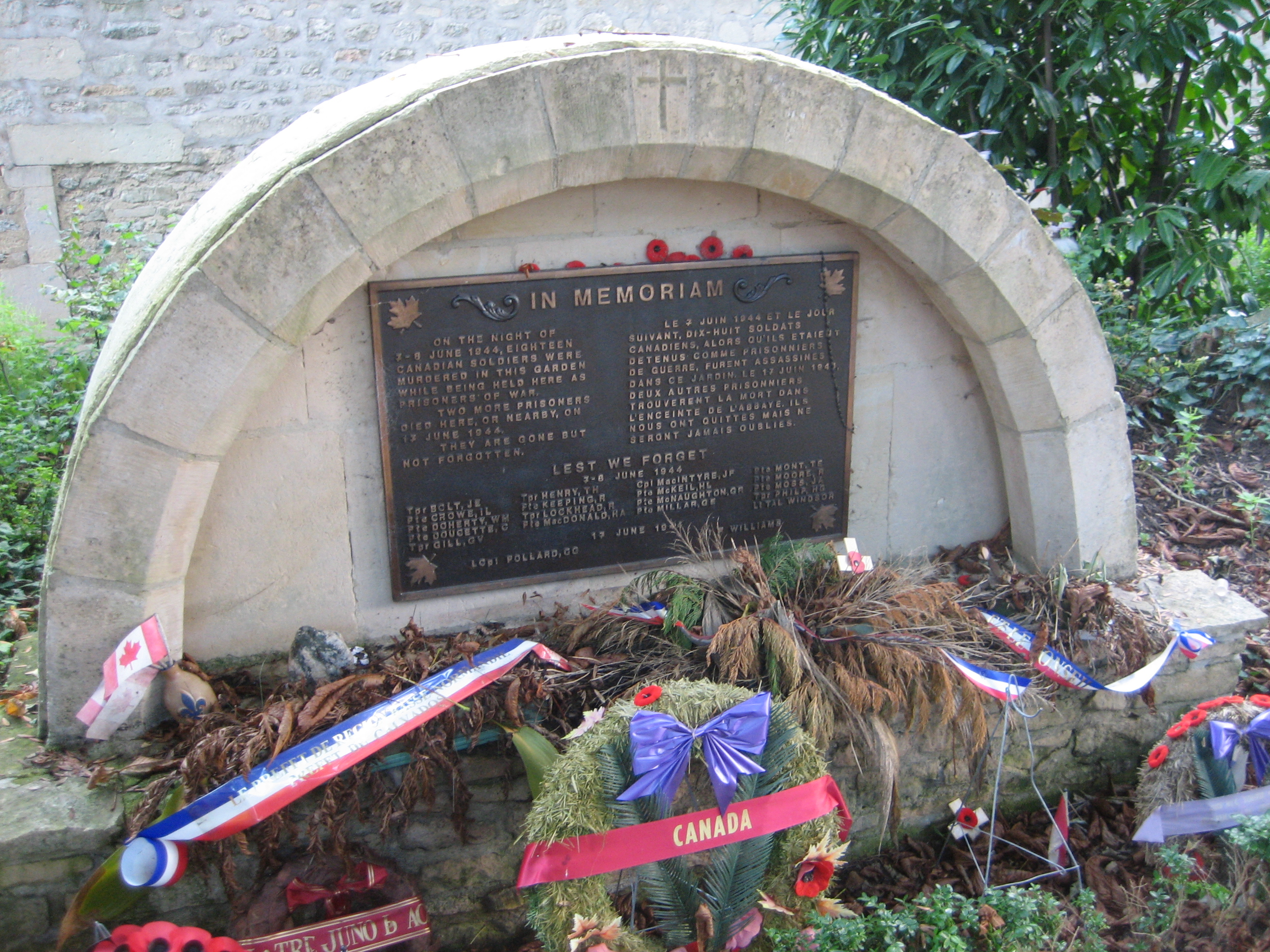
Memorial to the murdered Canadian soldiers at the Ardenne Abbey.

Another massacre was committed by the division on its second day of operations during Operation Overlord, the Allied invasion of France. During the evening of 7 June, 11 Canadian prisoners of war from the North Nova Scotia Highlanders, the Stormont, Dundas and Glengarry Highlanders and the 27th Armoured Regiment (The Sherbrooke Fusilier Regiment), were shot in the back of the head. After a year of investigations from August 1944 to August 1945, the Canadian War Crimes Commission (CWCC) strove to discover the details of the murders. As commander of the regiment, Kurt Meyer was the prime suspect. At Meyer's war crimes trial in December 1945, he was found guilty of inciting his troops to commit murder and of being responsible as a commander for the killings at the Abbey. He was sentenced to death on 28 December 1945; his sentence was commuted to life imprisonment in 1946. He was released in 1954.

== Ardennes offensive ==
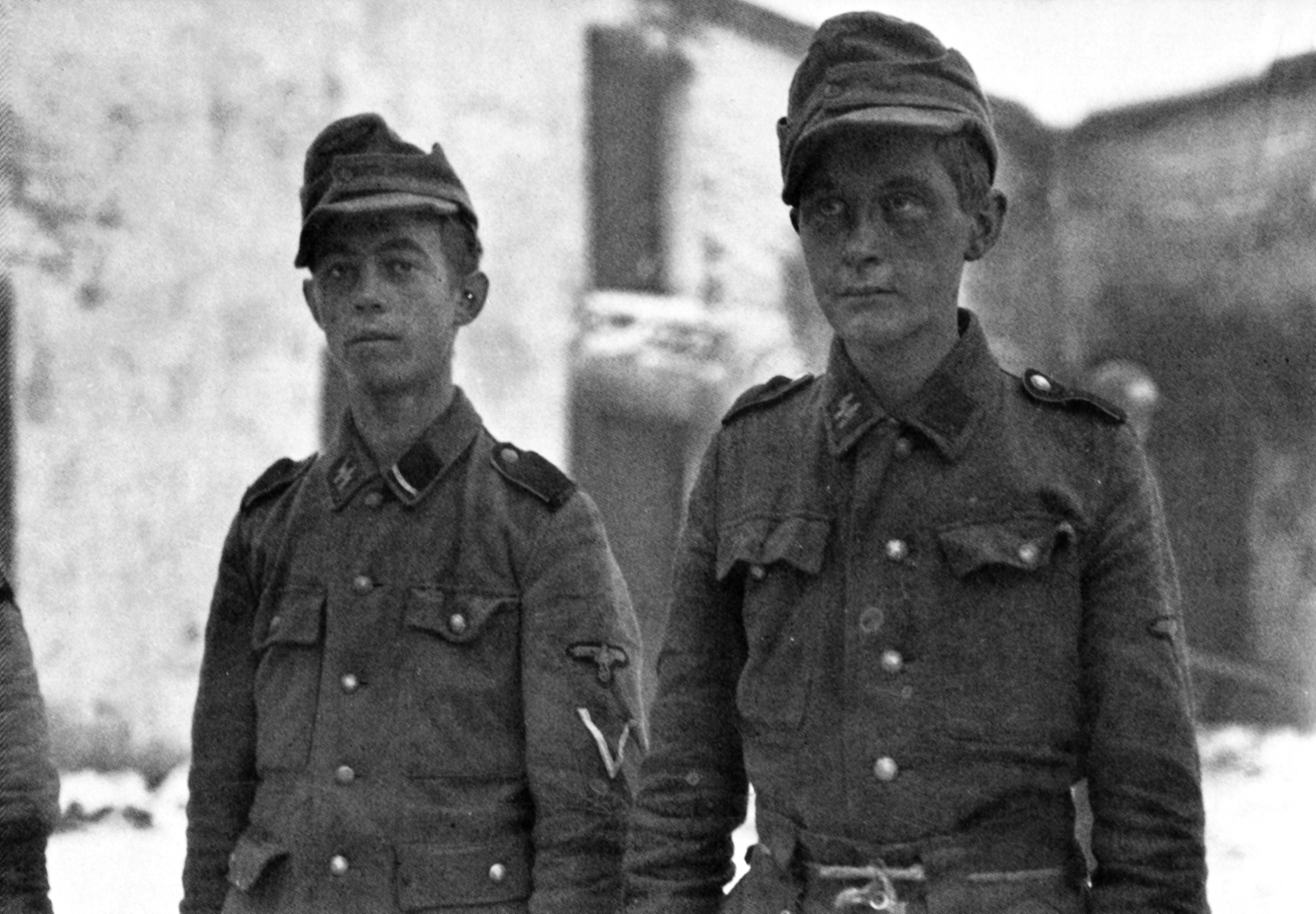
Two boys from the 12th SS Captured by U.S. Forces, December 1944.

In September, SS-Obersturmbannführer Hubert Meyer was placed in command of the division. In November 1944, the division was sent to Nienburg in Germany, where it was to be reformed. The majority of reinforcements were transferred from Luftwaffe and Kriegsmarine personnel. Hubert Meyer was replaced by SS-Obersturmbannführer Hugo Kraas, and the division was attached to the 6th SS Panzer Army of SS-Oberstgruppenführer Sepp Dietrich, which was forming up for Operation Wacht am Rhein (the Second Battle of the Ardennes, popularly known as the Battle of the Bulge), a large-scale offensive to recapture Antwerp and halt the Allied advance. The operation opened on 16 December 1944, with Kampfgruppe Peiper from the 1st SS Panzer Division Leibstandarte SS Adolf Hitler breaking through the American lines with some difficulty. After the 12th SS reached the front, it was met with heavy resistance from American troops stationed on the Elsenborn Ridge. Despite repeated efforts, the division could not budge the American defenders. As a result, the division was ordered to swing left and follow the advance line of the remainder of the 1st SS Panzer Division. American troops prevented the division from reaching its objective, and after the destruction of Kampfgruppe Peiper from the LSSAH, the advance of Dietrich's forces was altogether stopped. On 8 January Hitler gave the authorization to withdraw. The attack was ultimately a failure. The 12th SS had been severely mauled, with only 26 tanks and assault guns and an average of 120 men remaining in each battalion. In total during the offensive the division had lost 9,870 men which included 328 officers and 1,698 NCO's. By 28 January 1945, the 12th SS, along with all the German forces, had been pushed back to its starting positions.

== 1945 ==
On 14 January 1945, Dietrich's 6th SS Panzer Army was ordered to Hungary where it was to take part in an offensive to recapture the Hungarian oilfields and open the way to Budapest, where 45,000 men of the IX SS Mountain Corps had been encircled. While the division was in transit, the IV SS Panzer Corps launched several unsuccessful relief operations. The division, alongside the LSSAH as a part of I SS Panzer Corps arrived in Hungary in early February 1945, a few days before the city fell. The division next took part in Operation Spring Awakening, another operation to retake the Hungarian oilfields. The attack got underway on 6 March 1945; after initial success, the combination of the muddy terrain and strong Soviet resistance ground them to a halt. On 16 March, the Soviet forces counterattacked in strength, driving the entire southern front into a retreat towards Vienna. The Soviet forces took Vienna on 13 April. Retreating through Odenburg and Hirtenberg, the division reached Linz, Austria near the American lines. On 8 May 1945, 10,000 men of the division surrendered near the town of Enns to the troops of the 65th Infantry Division commanded by Major General Stanley Eric Reinhart.

== Organization ==
The organization structure of the division was as follows:

- SS-Panzergrenadierregiment 25 ("25th SS Panzer Grenadier Regiment 25")
- SS-Panzergrenadierregiment 26 ("26th SS Panzer Grenadier Regiment")
- SS-Panzerregiment 12 ("12th SS Panzer Regiment")
- SS-Panzerartillerieregiment 12 ("12th SS Panzer Artillery Regiment")

== Order of Battle June 1944 ==
- Divisional HQ
  - Brigadeführer Fritz Witt - killed in action 14 June 1944 (Note: Divisional command post was hit by naval gunfire) and replaced by Oberführer Kurt Meyer

25th SS Panzergrenadier Regiment Hitlerjugend,

(Standartenführer Kurt Meyer until 14 June 1944 when replaced by Obersturmbannführer Karl-Heinz Milius from 14 June 1944)

- I. Battalion, Sturmbannführer, Hans Waldmüller (Note: Killed in action 8 September 1944)
- II. Battalion, Sturmbannführer Hans Scappini (killed in action 7 June 1944)
- III. Battalion, Obersturmbannführer Karl-Heinz Milius (until 14 June 1944), Obersturmbannführer Fritz Steiger (from 14 June 1944)
- 13th (Panzerabwehrkanone) Company, Erwin Kaminski - anti-tank guns
- 14th Flak Company, Hauptsturmführer Brantl
- 15th Reconnaissance Company, Horst von Büttner (Killed in action 8–9 June 1944)
- 16th (Pionier) Company, Emil Werner - pioneers

26th SS Panzergrenadier Regiment Hitlerjugend,

(Standartenführer Wilhelm Mohnke)

- I. Battalion, Sturmbannführer Bernhard Krause
- II. Battalion, Sturmbannführer Bernhard Siebken
- III. Battalion, Sturmbannführer Erich Olboeter
- 13th (Panzerabwehrkanone) Company, Obersturmführer Polanski - anti-tank gun company
- 14th Flak Company, Obersturmführer Martin Stolze - anti-aircraft gun company
- 15th Reconnaissance Company, Obersturmführer Bayer
- 16th (Pionier) Company, Obersturmführer Trompke

12th SS Panzer Regiment,

(Obersturmbannführer Max Wünsche)

- I. Battalion (Sturmbannführer Arnold Jürgensen) - 66+ × Panther tanks),
- II. Battalion (Sturmbannführer Karl-Heinz Prinz) - 96 × Panzer IV,tanks

12th SS Artillery Regiment,

(Sturmbannführer Fritz Schröder)

- I. Battalion (12 × Wespe SP-artillery, 6 × Hummel SP-artillery)
- II. Battalion (18 × 105 mm LeFH 18 (towed howitzers))
- III. Battalion (12 × 150 mm SFH (towed heavy howitzers), 4 × 105 mm Kanone (towed howitzers))
- 12th SS Motorcycle Regiment
- 12th SS Reconnaissance Battalion, Sturmbannführer Gerhard Bremer
- 12th SS Panzerjäger Battalion, Sturmbannführer Jacob Hanreich - self propelled anti-tank guns
- 12th SS Werfer Battalion, Hauptsturmführer Willy Müller
  - I Battery (4 × 150 mm Nebelwerfer rocket mortars)
  - II Battery (4 × 150 mm Nebelwerfer)
  - III Battery (4 × 150 mm Nebelwerfer)
- 12th SS Flak Battalion, Hauptsturmführer Rudolf Fend
- 12th SS Pioneer Battalion, Sturmbannführer Siegfried Müller
- 12th SS Panzer Signals Battalion, Hauptsturmführer Erich Pandel
- 12th SS Instandsetzungs, Hauptsturmführer Artur Manthei
- 12th SS Nachschub Truppen, Hauptsturmführer Rudolf Kolitz
- 12th SS Wirtschafts Battalion
- 12th SS Fuhrerbewerber Lehrgange
- 12th SS War Reporter platoon (mot)
- 12th SS Feldgendarmerie Company
- 12th SS Field post office
- 12th SS Medical Battalion, Sturmbannführer Rolf Schulz M.D.

== Commanders ==
| No. | Portrait | Commander | Took office | Left office | Time in office |
|---|---|---|---|---|---|
| 1 | Fritz Witt | SS-Brigadeführer; Fritz Witt (1908–1944) | 24 June 1943 | 14 June 1944 † | 356 days |
| 2 | Kurt Meyer | SS-Oberführer; Kurt Meyer (1910–1961) | 16 June 1944 | 6 September 1944 | 82 days |
| - | Hubert Meyer | SS-Sturmbannführer; Hubert Meyer (1913–2012); Acting | 6 September 1944 | 24 October 1944 | 48 days |
| 3 | Fritz Kraemer | SS-Brigadeführer; Fritz Kraemer (1900–1959) | 24 October 1944 | 13 November 1944 | 20 days |
| 4 | Hugo Kraas | SS-Standartenführer; Hugo Kraas (1911–1980) | 13 November 1944 | 8 May 1945 | 176 days |

== See also ==
- List of Waffen-SS units
- SS Panzer Division order of battle

== Bibliography ==
- Bergström, Christer (2014). The Ardennes, 1944-1945: Hitler's Winter Offensive. Casemate Publishers. ISBN 9781612002774.
- Számvéber, Norbert (2018). Waffen-SS Armour in Normandy: The Combat History of SS Panzer Regiment 12 and SS Panzerjager Abteilung 12, Normandy 1944, based on their original war diaries. Helion and Company. ISBN 978-1912174805.
- Fellgiebel, Walther-Peer (1986). Die Träger des Ritterkreuzes des Eisernen Kreuzes 1939–1945 – Die Inhaber der höchsten Auszeichnung des Zweiten Weltkrieges aller Wehrmachtsteile. Podzun-Pallas. ISBN 978-3-7909-0284-6.
- Barbier, Mary (2007). D-day Deception: Operation Fortitude and the Normandy Invasion. Greenwood Publishing Group. ISBN 978-0-275-99479-2.
- Dollinger, Hans (1967) [1965]. The Decline and Fall of Nazi Germany and Imperial Japan. New York: Bonanza Books. ISBN 978-0517013137.
- Forty, George (2004). Villers Bocage. Battle Zone Normandy. Sutton Publishing. ISBN 0-7509-3012-8.
- Haller, Oliver (Spring 1996), "The Defeat of the 12th SS 7–10 June 1944" (PDF), Canadian Military History Quarterly, vol. 3, no. 1, archived from the original (PDF) on 27 March 2009
- McNab, Chris (2009). The SS: 1923–1945. Amber Books Ltd. ISBN 978-1-906626-49-5.
- McNab, Chris (2013). Hitler's Elite: The SS 1939-45. Osprey Publishing. ISBN 978-1782000884.
- Meyer Kurt, Grenadiers, JJ Fedorowicz Publishing ltd, 2001, ISBN 0-921991-59-2
- Meyer Hubert, The 12th SS: The History of the Hitler Youth Panzer Division, Stackpole Books, 2005, ISBN 0-8117-3198-7
- Meyer Hubert, The 12th SS Volume Two: The History of the Hitler Youth Panzer Division, Stackpole Books, 2005, ISBN 0-8117-3199-5
- Milner, Marc (2014). Stopping the Panzers. University Press of Kansas. ISBN 978-0700620036.
- Mitcham Samuel W, Panzers in Winter: Hitler's Army and the Battle of the Bulge, Greenwood Publishing Group, 2006, ISBN 0-275-97115-5
- Reynolds Michael, Steel Inferno, Spellmount Publishing, 2008, ISBN 978-1-86227-410-5
- Stein, George (1984) [1966]. The Waffen-SS: Hitler's Elite Guard at War 1939–1945. Cornell University Press. ISBN 0-8014-9275-0.
- Stacey, C. P. (1960). The Victory Campaign: The Operations in Northwest Europe, 1944-45. Official History of the Canadian Army in the Second World War. Vol. III. Ottawa: The Queen's Printer and Controller of Stationery.
- Zetterling, Niklas (2019). Normandy, 1944: German Military Organization, Combat Power and Organizational Effectiveness. Philadelphia, Pennsylvania: Casemate. ISBN 978-1612008165.
