= Emil Werner =

Czech sports shooter

Personal information
- Born: 1891
- Died: Unknown

Sport
- Sport: Sports shooting

Emil Werner (born 1891, date of death unknown) was a Czechoslovak sports shooter. He competed in two events at the 1924 Summer Olympics.
