= Ardenne Abbey =

Former monastery in Normandy, France

- Abbaye Notre-Dame d'Ardenne
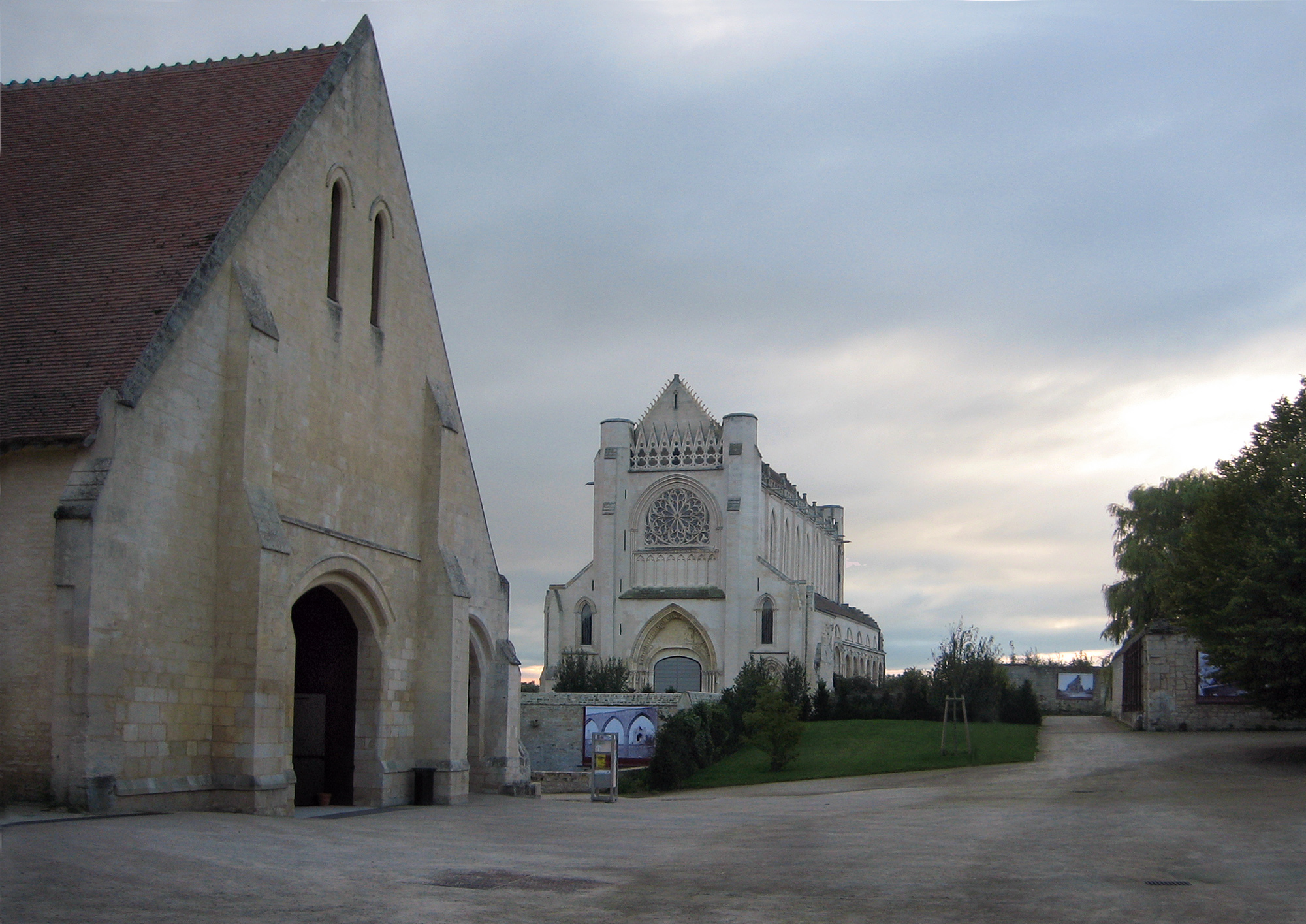
- Interactive map of Ardenne Abbey

Monastery information
- Full name: Abbey of Our Lady of Ardenne
- Order: Premonstratensian
- Denomination: Catholic
- Established: 1121
- Disestablished: 1789
- Mother house: La Lucerne Abbey
- Dedication: Mary, mother of Jesus
- Consecrated: 1138
- Diocese: Bayeux
- Controlled churches: Dependent priories in Hérouville-Saint-Clair, Saint-Martin-des-Besaces, Lion-sur-Mer and 12 parishes

People
- Founders: Ayulphe & Asseline du Marché

Architecture
- Heritage designation: Monument historique
- Designated date: 1911
- Style: French Gothic
- Groundbreaking: 1121
- Completion date: 1766

Site
- Location: Saint-Germain-la-Blanche-Herbe, Calvados, Normandy
- Country: France
- Coordinates: 49.1965°N 0.4139°W
- Website: www.imec-archives.com/l-abbaye-d-ardenne/

The Abbey of Our Lady of Ardenne (French: Abbaye Notre-Dame d'Ardenne), commonly called Ardenne Abbey, is a former Premonstratensian abbey founded in the 12th century and located near Saint-Germain-la-Blanche-Herbe in Calvados, near Caen, France. It is now occupied by the Institute of Contemporary Publishing Archives. Several buildings of the abbey have been preserved, including the church. These are protected as historic monuments.

In June 1944, 18 Canadian soldiers were executed at the abbey by members of the 12th SS Panzer Division Hitlerjugend. Evidence showed they were shot in the back of the head. The event has become known as the Ardenne Abbey massacre.

== History ==
=== Founding in the 12th century ===
According to legend, in 1121, a bourgeois from Caen named Ayulphe du Marché (Latinized as Ayulfus de Foro) and his wife Asseline, who were pious and practiced charity, had a vision of the Virgin Mary ordering them to build a chapel in that place. They acquired seven acres of the plot named "Saxons' wells" and erected a priory, which was headed by Canon Gilbert from Picardy. In 1138, the Romanesque church which had replaced the original chapel was consecrated by the Bishop of Bayeux, Richard of Gloucester.

In 1144, the priory was attached to La Lucerne Abbey, which brought it into the Order of Canons Regular of Prémontré, also known as the Premonstratensians or Norbertines.

In 1160 it became an independent abbey. Abbot Robert is known to have received the donation of a stone quarry at Bretteville-sur-Odon, an important indication of a construction campaign in the 12th century.

=== Middle Ages ===
The Ardenne Abbey expanded rapidly, and its heritage became very important.

- Priory of Saint Vincent de Lebisey (Hérouville Saint-Clair) in 1291.
- Priory of the Hermitage (Saint-Martin-des-Besaces) in the late 12th century.
- Priory of St. Thomas (Lion-sur-Mer) in 1328.
- The priests of twelve parishes in Calvados and Orne were appointed by Ardenne.

On February 23, 1230, the choir of the Abbey collapsed and killed 26 canons, among them the third abbot, Nicolas. This disaster would have a significant impact on the abbey's design.

=== 15th century ===
The abbey was affected by the Hundred Years' War.

On December 14, 1417, during the siege of Caen, the canons had to take refuge in that city to escape the looting of the abbey.

On June 5, 1450, the abbey was occupied during the siege of Caen by Charles VII of France, who only left it after the surrender of the English garrison on July 5. After the war ended, Abbot Robert Chartier began to rebuild the cloister and a conventual building.

=== 16th century ===
During the early 16th century the abbey was held in commendam and began to decline. During the Wars of Religion the canons twice had to seek refuge in Caen. In 1562 the abbey was sacked and many buildings were abandoned. The abbey remained in a state of ruin for many years, only occupied by two or three canons at a time. The abbey gradually rebuilt and by 1587 there were eight canons, four novices and their master.

The rebuilding was overseen by Prior Jean de la Croix, who came from the Belle-Étoile Abbey in 1596. He restored the abbey and remained the spiritual head of the Abbey for nearly 58 years, following the visit of Servais de Lairuelz, the vicar general of the Premonstratensians.

=== 17th century ===
The restoration continued into the 17th century following a concordat in 1602 between the prior and the new commendator, Pierre de Villemor, despite hesitations regarding the financial side of the restoration. In 1609 the church was consecrated. By 1639 a dormitory, library and a new altar were built. It is thought that under the leadership of John of the Cross that the Gothic cloisters were closed.

On November 12, 1627, the prior, in conflict with his abbot Guillaume Galodé, adopted most of the reforming statutes of Pont-à-Mousson. The abbey only adhered to the Congregation of Lorraine only after obtaining guarantees on regionalisation, as Lorriane was not a part of the Kingdom of France. John of the Cross convinced other abbeys to adhere to this reform, despite strong opposition, and Ardenne became one of the most influential abbeys in Normandy.

John of the Cross died on January 4, 1654, and a manuscript says that he was buried beneath the sanctuary towards the east of the complex. After his death, more building works were completed, including the Saint-Norbert gate, giving access to the complex from the north in 1672. In 1686 the ruined vaults of the abbey were replaced by frames of wooden ogives, the gallery running along the cloister was restored in 1689 and two chapels were built against the northern wall of the church.

=== 18th century ===
The press was restored and, on the north side, a new abbey house was built after 1711 outside the complex for the commendatory abbot. In 1766, the eastern gallery of the cloister was rebuilt and the old chapter house was demolished.

During the French Revolution the canons were expelled and the abbey was sold as a national property on 1 May 1791 to a Parisian named Chauffrey. In 1795, three successive sales dispersed the furniture and numerous paintings. In 1799 the abbey was acquired by Englishman William Russell, a Unitarian, who lived there until 1814.

With the encouragement of Protestant pastor, M. Fontbonne du Vernet, Russell approached the Prefect of the Department to request a church to assemble in at Caen. This was refused, but Russell was permitted to open the small church on his property at the Ardenne Abbey. Russell repaired, and refurnished the church, and the first service was held there early in October 1801. It was the first Protestant church to open in France, since the Revolution. The church was soon overflowing, and, by November 1803, the congregation was able to move to a larger chapel in Caen.

=== 19th century ===
The high altar with its two panel paintings representing Saint Norbert and Saint Augustine was transferred in 1812 to the Church of Saint John of Caen. Beginning in 1814, the abbey and its land was divided up between different owner, being occupied by three separate farms. By 1830, the cloister as well as most of the abbey house had been demolished. Arcisse de Caumont witnessed further destruction of the site due to the removal of stone for new constructions, including the agricultural building built by the new owners.

=== 20th century ===
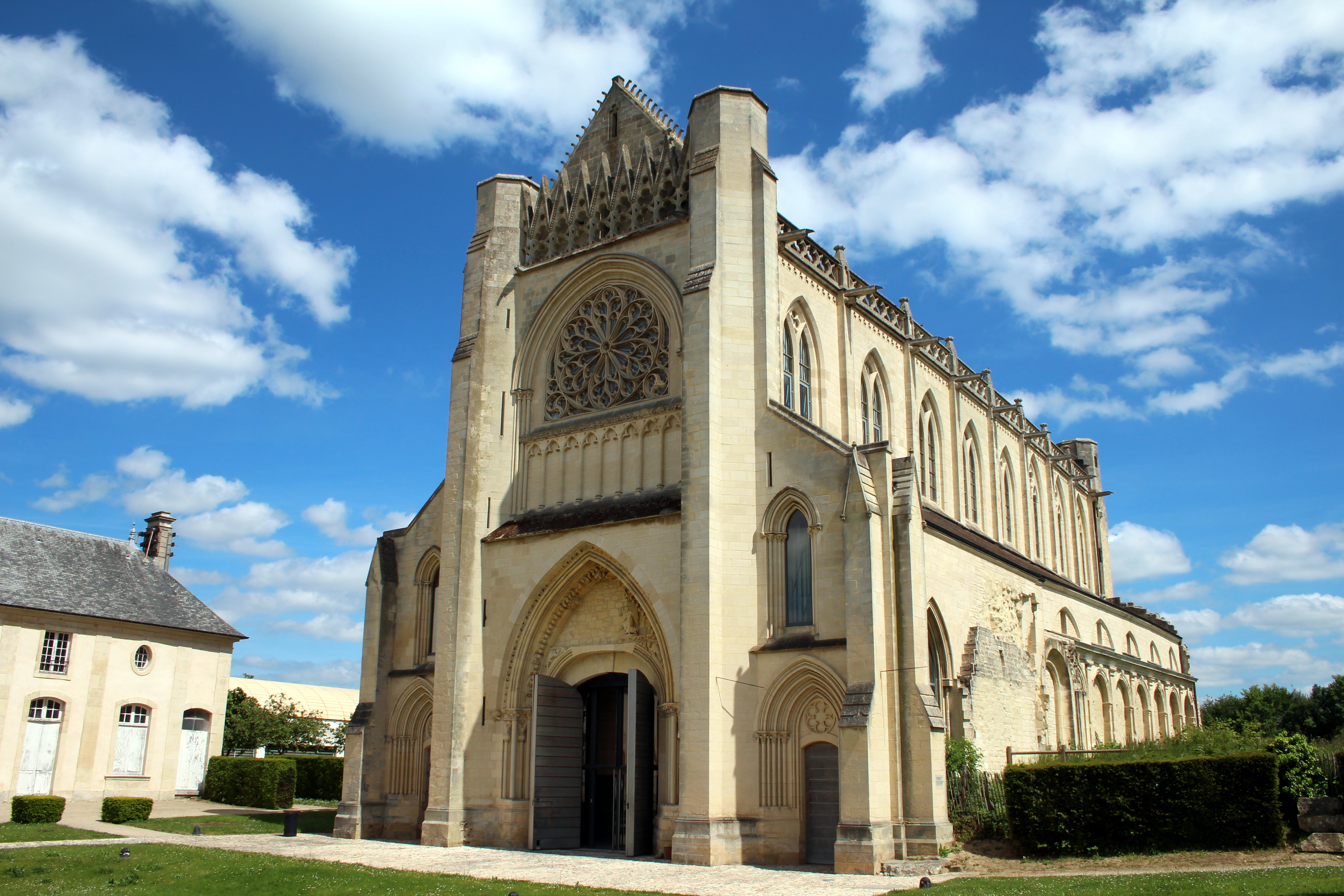
Ardenne Abbey

In 1918 a large part of the old abbey (church, north door, perimeter wall, barn and west gate) was classified as a monument historique, with the remainder of the Abbey classified in 1947.

During World War II one of the owners, Roland Vico, was a member of the resistance. The buildings were used to store weapons until its occupation by German soldiers, who used the towers of the abbey to observe the surroundings.

==== Ardenne Abbey Massacre ====
In June 1944, 20 Canadian soldiers were massacred in a garden at the abbey by members of the 12th SS Panzer Division Hitlerjugend over the course of several days and weeks. During the course of the Normandy Campaign an estimated "156 Canadian prisoners of war are believed to have been executed by the 12th SS Panzer Division (the Hitler Youth) in the days and weeks following the D-Day landings. In scattered groups, in various pockets of the Normandy countryside, they were taken aside and shot."

== See also ==
- Catholic Church in France
- France during World War II
