= Saint-Germain-la-Blanche-Herbe =

- Commune
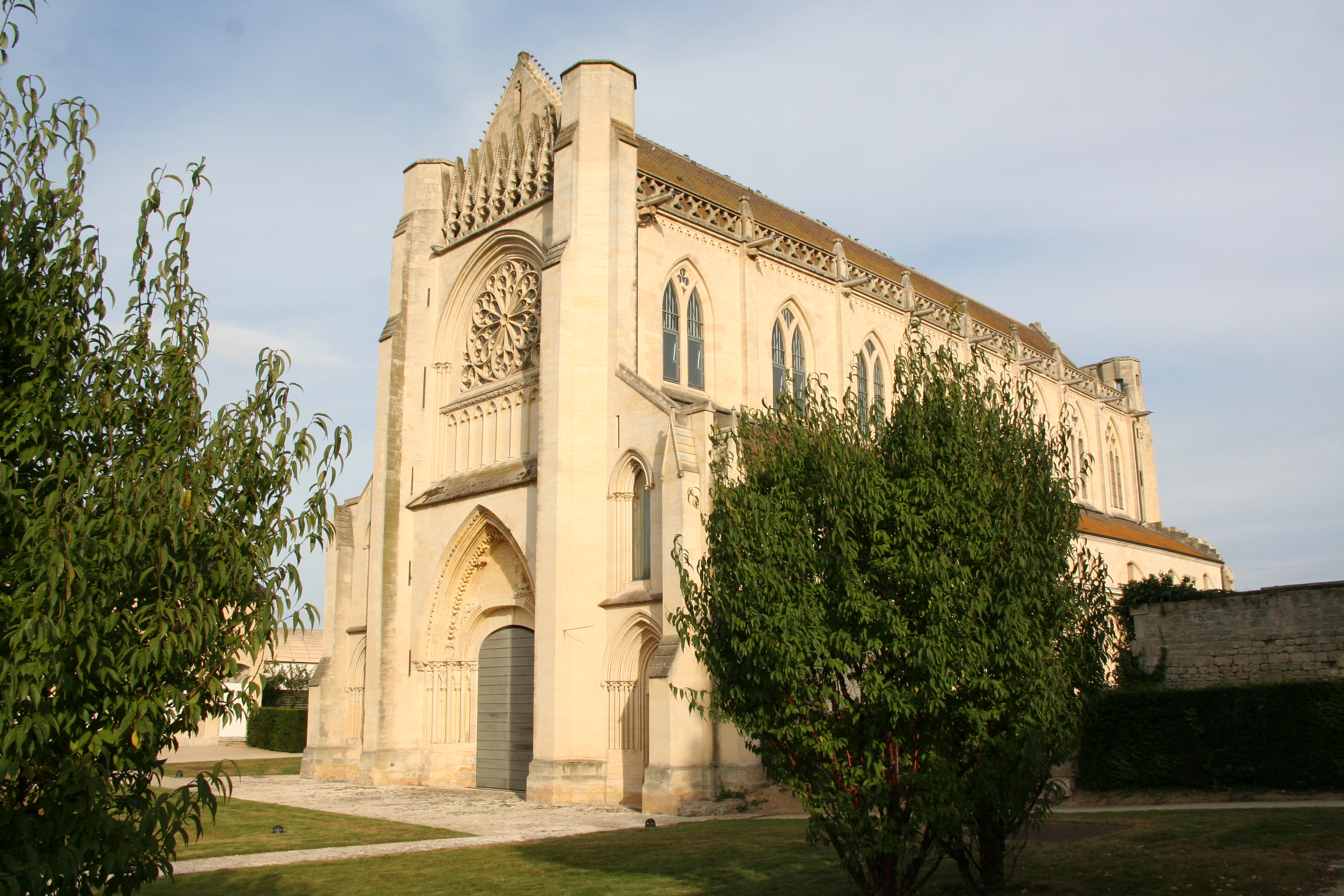
- Ardenne Abbey
- Location of Saint-Germain-la-Blanche-Herbe
- Location within France Location within Normandy
- Coordinates: 49°11′25″N 0°24′34″W
- Country: France
- Region: Normandy
- Department: Calvados
- Arrondissement: Caen
- Canton: Caen-2
- Intercommunality: CU Caen la Mer

Government
  - Mayor (2020–2026): Stéphane Le Helley
- Area^{1}: 2.63 km^{2} (1.02 sq mi)
- Elevation: 50 m (160 ft)
- Highest elevation: 76 m (249 ft)
- Lowest elevation: 60 m (200 ft)
- Population (2023): 2,482
  - Density: 944/km^{2} (2,440/sq mi)
- Time zone: UTC+01:00 (CET)
  - Summer (DST): UTC+02:00 (CEST)
- INSEE/Postal code: 14587 /14280
- ^{1} French Land Register data, which excludes lakes, ponds, glaciers > 1 km^{2} (0.386 sq mi or 247 acres) and river estuaries.

Saint-Germain-la-Blanche-Herbe (French pronunciation: [sɛ̃ ʒɛʁmɛ̃ la blɑ̃ʃ ɛʁb]) is a commune in the Calvados department in the Normandy region in northwestern France.

== Population ==
Historical population

Year	Pop.	±% p.a.
1793	304	—
1800	249	−2.81%
1806	306	+3.50%
1821	283	−0.52%
1831	286	+0.11%
1836	313	+1.82%
1841	305	−0.52%
1846	292	−0.87%
1851	273	−1.34%
1856	256	−1.28%
1861	269	+1.00%
1866	258	−0.83%
1872	262	+0.26%
1876	246	−1.56%
1881	240	−0.49%
1886	237	−0.25%
1891	253	+1.32%
1896	177	−6.90%
1901	186	+1.00%

Year	Pop.	±% p.a.
1906	195	+0.95%
1911	175	−2.14%
1921	196	+1.14%
1926	209	+1.29%
1931	215	+0.57%
1936	233	+1.62%
1946	212	−0.94%
1954	303	+4.57%
1962	265	−1.66%
1968	232	−2.19%
1975	1,327	+28.29%
1982	1,223	−1.16%
1990	1,615	+3.54%
1999	2,531	+5.12%
2007	2,454	−0.39%
2012	2,436	−0.15%
2017	2,306	−1.09%
2023	2,482	+1.23%

Source: EHESS and INSEE (1968-2023)

== Twin towns – sister cities ==
Saint-Germain-la-Blanche-Herbe is twinned with:

- Colceresa, Italy. Since 2001

== See also ==
- Ardenne Abbey
- Communes of the Calvados department
