= Sherbrooke Fusilier Regiment =

27th Armoured Regiment (The Sherbrooke Fusilier Regiment)
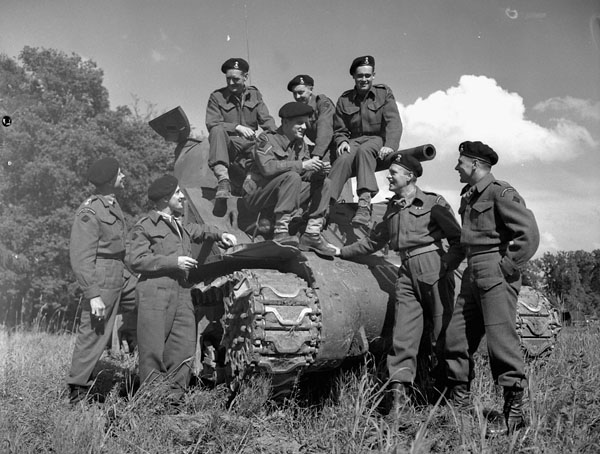
- The Sherman tank Bomb on 8 June 1945 in Zutphen, Netherlands
- Active: 1940–1946
- Country: Canada
- Branch: Canadian Army
- Role: armoured regiment
- Size: Regiment
- Motto: Droit au but
- Decorations: .

The Sherbrooke Fusilier Regiment was a Second World War Canadian armoured regiment created in 1940 with officers and men from two Militia regiments in Sherbrooke, Quebec.

The name is a blend of Les Fusiliers de Sherbrooke, a francophone infantry unit, and the Sherbrooke Regiment, an English-speaking machine gun unit. The armoured corps lineage of the Sherbrooke Fusilier Regiment is carried forward by the present-day reserve regiment, The Sherbrooke Hussars.

Sydney Valpy Radley-Walters, later Director-General Training and Recruiting Canadian Forces, was an officer of the regiment during the war. He had three tanks shot out from under him and was wounded twice. He ended the war a lieutenant-colonel decorated with a Military Cross and Distinguished Service Order. The second most important artifact from the Second World War, after the guidon, is a Sherman tank named Bomb which landed in Normandy on 6 June and served on the front lines throughout the campaigns until May 1945 in Germany without being destroyed or knocked out. It was returned to Canada after the war, and is retained as a memorial.

== History ==
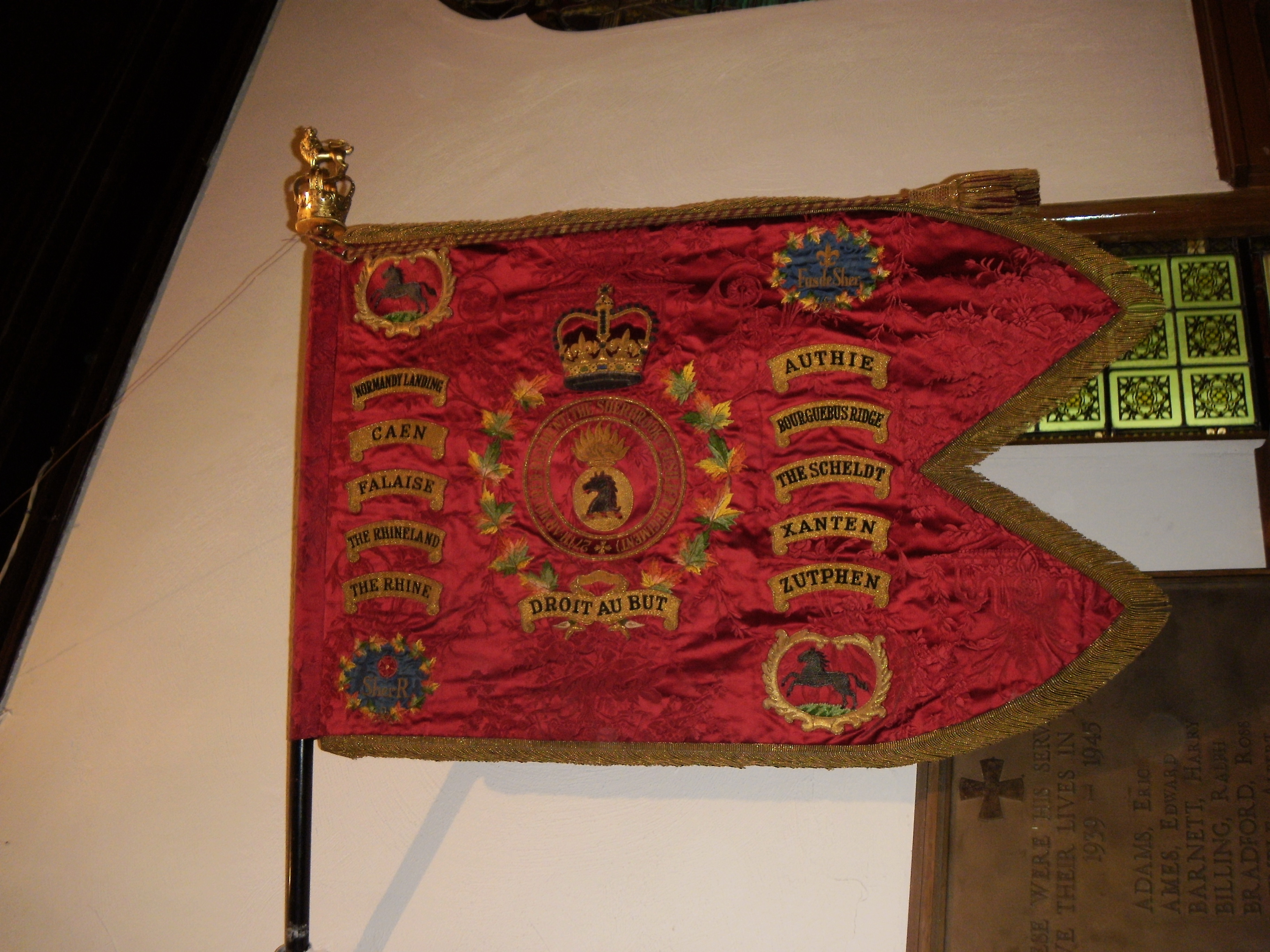
The guidon of the Sherbrooke Fusilier Regiment

=== Formation ===
The regiment was formed as an infantry unit, The Sherbrooke Fusiliers Regiment in 1940, a plural form of the name which lasted only a short time. After GO 42/41 and GO 62/41, the name 'Fusiliers' changed from the plural to the singular 'Fusilier' form. It was converted to an armoured regiment in 1942, becoming the 27th Armoured Regiment (The Sherbrooke Fusilier Regiment). Initially part of the 4th Armoured Brigade, by the time it went into action, it was in the 2nd Canadian Armoured Brigade.

The regiment's commanding officer from 1943 was Mel Gordon who had been commissioned as a lieutenant in 1924. In 1941 as a trained major, Gordon was posted to the 12th Armoured Regiment (Three Rivers Regiment) at Camp Borden, Ontario. He was officer commanding "B" Squadron in Canada and in England until January 1943 when he was promoted to lieutenant-colonel and given command of the 27th Armoured Regiment (Sherbrooke Fusilier Regiment). Gordon led the regiment through training in England then in combat through France, Belgium and the Netherlands. Gordon's regimental headquarters Sherman was the first tank into the liberated French town of Caen. He was immediately inducted to the Distinguished Service Order (DSO) in the field in Belgium. Gordon retained his command despite heavy losses, setbacks, and the challenges throughout the Northwest European campaign. Gordon is described as having a cool, calm, and timbered (sic) voice, which over wireless had reassuring effects on the soldiers.

=== Invasion of France ===
==== Normandy Landings (6 June 1944) ====
The tank element of the landing establishment of the regiment was a Regimental HQ (four Shermans), HQ Squadron with six anti-aircraft cruiser tanks and 11 Stuart light tanks; three fighting squadron HQs three Shermans including one 'rear link' radio equipped, and five troops of three Shermans or Fireflies each. The personnel establishment was 37 officers and 661 other ranks, short by one officer and 14 other ranks.

The regiment loaded their Landing Craft, Tank in Ostend, UK on 3 June. The regiment was equipped with waterproofed 75-mm gun Sherman and 17pdr gunned Sherman Firefly tanks. On debarking the LCT they dragged "Porpoise" sledges filled with supplies to shore. They landed to the west of Bernières-sur-Mer of Juno Beach just after noon on 6 June 1944 with the 9th Canadian Infantry Brigade. The SFR was their assigned tank force to exploit through the bridgehead created by the assault infantry and tanks of the 8th Canadian Infantry Brigade. The beach was congested with other troops, and progress was slow getting inland to their assembly area near Beny-sur-Mer.

With about three hours of daylight remaining and three companies of North Nova Scotias riding on their tanks, the SFR passed through the assault battalions' forward lines and fought their way southward toward their D-Day objectives. The North Nova Scotia's reached Villons-les-Buissons by dusk and ran into more German resistance. When it was evident that their objectives were still about four miles beyond near Carpiquet, they formed all-around defences around La Mare for the night. Behind them the brigade was fighting bypassed German positions in the assembly area.

Starting from their exposed but advanced positions, on 7 June a force including all SFR squadrons pushed out in four prongs towards a cluster of villages south of Villons and Les Buissons, including Buron and Authie; A Sqn right, HQ and C Sqn centre, B Sqn left, and Recce Troop exploring the enemy's rear area. The advance-to-contact included tank-on-tank combat. Significant numbers of German half-tracks and other lighter armoured vehicles were destroyed. The SFR lost several tanks including most of the Fireflies which were commanded by junior officers. A number of men were killed, wounded, missing and captured. Twenty-three Canadian prisoners including six SFR soldiers were killed by their captors at the Ardenne Abbey massacre. After the war, the German commander Brigadefuhrer Kurt Meyer was convicted of war crimes.

The regiment's Anglican chaplain (padre) Captain Walter Brown was one of two Canadian padres killed in Normandy. After landing on the 6th and throughout the day of the 7th, Brown was helping the medical officer at the regimental aid post. On the evening of 7 June, he responded to a message that, "the padre is needed at the front". Travelling by Jeep, Brown, his batman and driver Lt Grainger, and a passenger LCpl Greenwood, turned a corner and immediately encountered a German patrol. There was an exchange of fire. Greenwood was killed and Grainger was injured. Brown was seen surrendering and later reported missing. His body was identified on 10 July at a casualty collection point. The regimental padre observed marks on his chest suggesting Brown was possibly bayonetted by his captors.

The battle did not change the front substantially. However, this action and the next month of skirmishing blunted half an enemy division, prevented them from attacking into the beachhead, and remained a preoccupation for the German leadership. B Sqn started with fifteen tanks and ended with five, including Bomb. The SFR and the North Nova Scotia Highlanders are the only Canadian units with the Authie battle honour.

==== Caen (8–9 July 1944) Operation Charnwood ====
The advance to Caen renewed in early July 1944. To the West the Americans had cleared large areas of western Normandy and pushed out of their bridgeheads. Although the Canadian and British divisions were strong, the thick hedges of Normandy favoured the defenders, especially around Caen. If anything, the comparative stalemate kept the Germans from moving troops away from Caen.

The battle of Orne began when the Canadians pushed out to the towns of Buron and Gruchy. Two SFR squadrons were attached to two battalion-strength infantry battlegroups. Once into the village of Buron, A Sqn's tanks helped the infantry fight house to house. The German defenders stubbornly fought to the last man rather than withdraw. On the afternoon of 7 July, the SFR and two British M10 self-propelled anti-tank gun troops destroyed 14 counterattacking tanks. By nightfall on the 8th, A Sqn's five remaining tanks had the high ground south of Buron. By 9 July the German defences outside Caen collapsed. The SFR CO himself (LtCol Mel Gordon) and his HQ were the first tanks into Caen.

==== Crossing the Orne ====
While somewhat anticlimactic compared to other battles, the assault crossing of the Orne River by SFR tanks provided hard-pressed infantry battalions with much needed close support as they struggled to secure the crossing in depth.

Official war artist Major Will Ogilvie produced a dramatic panchromatic watercolour of the tanks, entitled, "Tanks of the 27th Canadian Armoured Regiment (The Sherbrooke Fusilier Regiment) Cross the Orne Near Caen by Ferry, 19 July 1944". Modern-day researchers, writing in French, have identified numerous crossings pushed by Canadian engineers over the Orne River, including photo comparisons to the Ogilivie work.

Faubourg de Vaucelles

The Canadian infantry continued their fight clearing the Faubourg de Vaucelles suburb of Caen, south of the Orne River. Just as the SFR's tanks reinforced the infantry, the enemy's withdrawal allowed them to harden their defences, which could have been disastrous for the attackers. The battle turned when a strong British force hooked around behind the built-up area from the northeast and linked up with the Canadians.

Bourguébus Ridge

As high command pressure grew for bolder strategic gains, the Canadians were grouped into larger and larger manoeuver formations. Over two weeks' of fighting in mid-July, Canadian infantry were thrown toward the small towns and dominating high features south of Caen, including Verrières Ridge. Available tank squadrons were paired with attacking battalions. The SFR's battles were between the Orne River and nearby Bourgébus Ridge. Across the division's frontage, Canadian casualties were very heavy. When the SFR was pulled back, A Sqn was down to six tanks and the other squadrons not much better. While the overall operation did not achieve all of its objectives, the Germans had had to contain aggressive attacks across a wide front and were left so badly weakened that the next battles were decisive.

==== Operation Totalize ====
During Operation Totalize, A Squadron of the regiment, commanded by Radley-Walters, was in a support position with six 75 mm Shermans and two 17-pounder Sherman Fireflies in a walled chateau compound when the SS tank commander Michael Wittmann, one of the highest scoring German tank commanders of the war, led a heavily armoured counterattack on 8 August 44 near Gaumesnil attempting to drive a seam between British and Canadian formations. The Sherbrooke tanks were placed behind stone walls with holes knocked out for firing positions about 300 m broadside to the German platoon's axis of advance. The Canadian tanks quickly destroyed two Tiger tanks, two Panzer IVs and two self-propelled guns, while British tank fire destroyed three other Tigers as the German counterattack collapsed. Wittmann and his crew in their Tiger I tank were killed by tank fire from either British or Sherbooke tanks. Modern investigations and interviews suggest the Sherbrooke tanks actually destroyed the German Tiger tank number 007 that was commanded by Wittmann as the British tanks, of 3 Troop, A Squadron, 1st Northamptonshire Yeomanry, were probably too far away. However this claim is supported by no documentation and is dismissed as speculative by some historians. Modern topographic study suggests the British Fireflies were more than 1 km distant, while the Canadians were within hundreds of metres broadside of the German tanks. The 1985 investigation of the 1st Northamptonshire Yeomanry included a war diary entry where Tiger tank numbers 312, 007 and 314 were recorded after the battle. The tanks being destroyed by the Firefly of Gunner Joe Ekins. Eyewitness accounts of the battle were recorded by former members of the regiment who were there. Sydney Valpy Radley-Walters and other Canadian veterans interviewed after the war said they had no way of associating individual German crews to specific tanks, only that they knocked out the most dangerous tanks on the battlefield.

The intensity of the break-out battles can be seen in the number of replacement vehicles that had to be brought forward. At the beginning of August the 27th Armoured Regiment had 63 fit Sherman 75 mm and Firefly 17-Pounder tanks. In the next two and a half weeks, 23 were lost or damaged by enemy action, and half of those were repairable. Thirteen more were out of action for second-line maintenance, or work that was beyond the immediate capability of the unit's mechanics or facilities. Two were in first-line maintenance, or temporarily out of the line for manageable repairs. Thirteen replacement tanks were received, either newly arrived from stocks in UK or repaired from battlefield salvage. Therefore, on 18 August, the SFR could field 38 fit tanks not including the two at the regimental light aid detachment (LAD) on two days' availability. Though not a perfect count, this was enough to theoretically field three squadrons of four troops. Each troop could field three tanks each, plus four for the headquarters squadron. Other regiments involved in heavy combat equally received large numbers of replacement tanks in short order.

==== Clair Tizon (10–14 August), The Liaison (14–16 August), Falaise (11–23 August), and Falaise Road ====
While the British and Canadians were holding the enemy in the east of the Normandy bridgehead, the Americans were able to break through German lines in the west. Meanwhile, the Germans started moving in another Army Group and redeployed others to attack the Americans. Seeing an opportunity to entrap the enemy, the Canadians were ordered to relentlessly drive south.

Clair Tizon was a series of infantry and tank engagements to capture bridges south of Caen. After the massed infantry and armour attacks south from Caen, the Canadians were ordered to attack along a parallel axis as a way of diluting German defenders. The Liaison was a series of leapfrog battles to clear a long narrow river valley further west of the Caen to Falaise road. Infantry battalions were paired with squadrons from the 2nd Canadian Armoured Brigade to move past each other from one objective to the next. The SFR was ordered in because it had worked feverishly to replace lost crews and tanks following its last battles. Falaise was the bigger battle to close off two trapped German armies.

After reviewing the last two months of fighting, the commander of II Canadian Corps, Lieutenant General Guy Simonds decided that to keep the enemy off balance, he needed to leapfrog German lines with half-squadrons of tanks, mechanized engineers, self-propelled artillery and infantry in armoured personnel carriers, grouped into fighting columns. Although highly classified in wartime, the Allies also had the German plans because of Top Secret intercepted signals decoded with ULTRA.

Column after column of Canadians fought day after day to wear down the German defences. Nearby Polish and British divisions pressed hard. The Americans formed a big hook that trapped the Germans in the Falaise Pocket. Two SFR squadrons and their battalions actually entered the town of Falaise on 16 August. By 21 August, SFR tanks and infantry of the Lincoln and Welland Regiment, closed one of the last routes in or out of the pocket near Hill 258 northeast of Trun, near Les Champeaux. Nearly fifty thousand Germans were killed, wounded or captured. The battle of Normandy was over, but the pursuit of retreating Germans had just begun.

Operation Kitten, Operation Paddle

The closure of the Falaise Gap brought dramatic enemy capture and destroyed numbers, but the enemy was far from defeated. Their rearguard operations slowed the SFR and the various ever-changing brigades and regiments it supported. In the weeks that followed, the SFR refitted with replacement tanks and crews, worked on lessons learned, and halted when ordered due to fuel shortages.

=== Clearing the Channel Coast ===
As the Germans retreated from France into Belgium and the Netherlands, Allied supply lines became longer. The port of Antwerp was needed by the Allies to improve their logistics challenges, but the approaches to Antwerp were still controlled by the Germans. The first step in a four-part battle was to clear the area north of Antwerp and secure access to South Beveland.

The SFR was attached to the I British Corps, with individual squadrons supporting different British infantry brigades' attacks. Initially daily advances gained bridges and valuable ground between the dominating canals. The operations were distinctive for the large numbers of disorganized prisoners taken while suffering limited friendly casualties. Despite the teamwork of the British, Polish and Canadians to clear the banks of the Scheldt, the enemy consolidated their resistance along the only axis available. The fighting was fierce. The well-entrenched German forces made it difficult for the Allied Forces to advance.

=== The Scheldt (October and November 1944) ===
Following the comparatively conventional battle for Antwerp, the action to clear the Scheldt Estuary was anything but simple. Canadian and British forces, mostly infantry supported by artillery, and direct fire from tanks, struggled across terrible conditions to clear German defenders little by little from the shores and islands between Antwerp and the North Sea.

=== Lower Maas ===
Through November and December after the intense actions to clear the Scheldt, the Canadians were ordered to move towards the Meuse (Maas) delta, a comparatively quiet sector held by the American 82nd Airborne and replace a British Guards regiment, which gave the SFR time to rest and receive training on new techniques. The front was still active, but generally static due to badly damaged roads, large flooded areas, and winter conditions. Throughout January and February 1945, the whole regiment or individual squadrons were moved around the 2nd and 3rd Canadian Infantry Division areas, and were often assigned direct and indirect fire tasks against enemy positions.

In early January 1945, Lt Col Gordon left and Lt Col Jenner assumed command for the remainder of the war.

=== The Rhineland and the Hochwald (February – March 1945) ===
As late winter arrived, significant Canadian forces, with attached British divisions mounted Operations Veritable and Blockbuster to push into heavily defended German territory. Once more, the SFR was parcelled out to attacking brigades and regiments to fight the infantry onto their objectives. Mobility was hindered by sodden terrain, heavy forest, well-fortified defences and highly motivated defenders. With the general disappearance of enemy armour and more conventional tank fighting, the SFR's role was characterized by shock and firepower for the infantry, whose progress was regularly aided by 'Kangaroo' armoured personnel carrier, flail minesweeping tanks, and flame-throwing tanks.

Early in the morning on 1 March 1945, supported by artillery fire and a troop of tanks from the Sherbrooke Fusiliers, The Essex Scottish Regiment attacked the northern part of the forest. On the left flank, Major Fred Tilston led C Company into well-defended enemy trenches. The last stage of the attack crossed soft ground where the tanks could not follow. Despite counterattacks and shortages of grenades and ammunition, the position was held. Tilston was badly wounded and refused evacuation until relieved by the one remaining company officer. His actions earned the Victoria Cross.

=== Xanten (February – March 1945) ===
As winter ended, the First Canadian Army intensified the drive to overwhelm and defeat the Germans, starting with pushing them out of the area between the Meuse (Maas) to the west and the Rhine to the north and against the Ninth US Army to the south. The opening attack of Operation Blockbuster saw the 2nd Canadian Armoured Brigade including the SFR and Fort Garry Horse, with infantry battalions from the 6th Canadian Infantry Brigade riding on the tanks or in Kangaroos, attacking fiercely defending German positions. The last objective was Xanten, achieved in early March after fighting which the official histories described as the most grim and gruelling of the war.

=== The Rhine to the end of the war ===
The Rhine River was both a physical obstacle for the advancing Allied armies, but a psychological barrier for the defending Germans. By establishing themselves on the eastern side of the Rhine, the Allies proved that they could control German territory and defeat the Third Reich.

Squadrons of the SFR supported Canadian infantry clearing the German town of Emmerich on the eastern shores of the Rhine River (March – April 1945). Even though this was a significant point of resistance for the Germans, the Canadians were well-practiced in their roles by this point in the war, and what might have been a weeks long set piece battle in Normandy was completed within days. Hoch Elten is a local high feature which was strongly defended, but overtaken.

The SFR supported attacking Canadian infantry battalions clearing defenders around Zutphen Often carrying the foot soldiers on the tanks, the SFR provided direct and indirect fire against the enemy. Zutphen was notable for the close cooperation between pioneers and tankers to create small water crossings which were then successfully exploited. The Zutphen battle honour was given to six infantry regiments and a reconnaissance unit as well as the SFR.

The Dutch town of Deventer was cleared by Canadian infantry and a handful of SFR tanks from B Squadron; the enemy quickly fled. Although this was the last battle honour awarded the SFR, the remainder of April and May saw sharp enemy defensive actions and Canadian dashes to seize territory, with the associated drain on lives, men and material.

LtCol S. Radley-Walters assumed command in July 1945. The regiment was disbanded on 15 February 1946.

Its battle honours shared equally by the two predecessor units the Sherbrooke Hussars and the Les Fusiliers de Sherbrooke.

== Tank Bomb ==
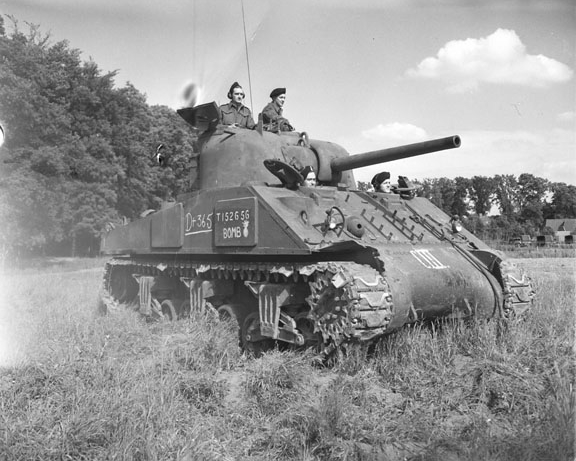
Bomb a year after D-Day

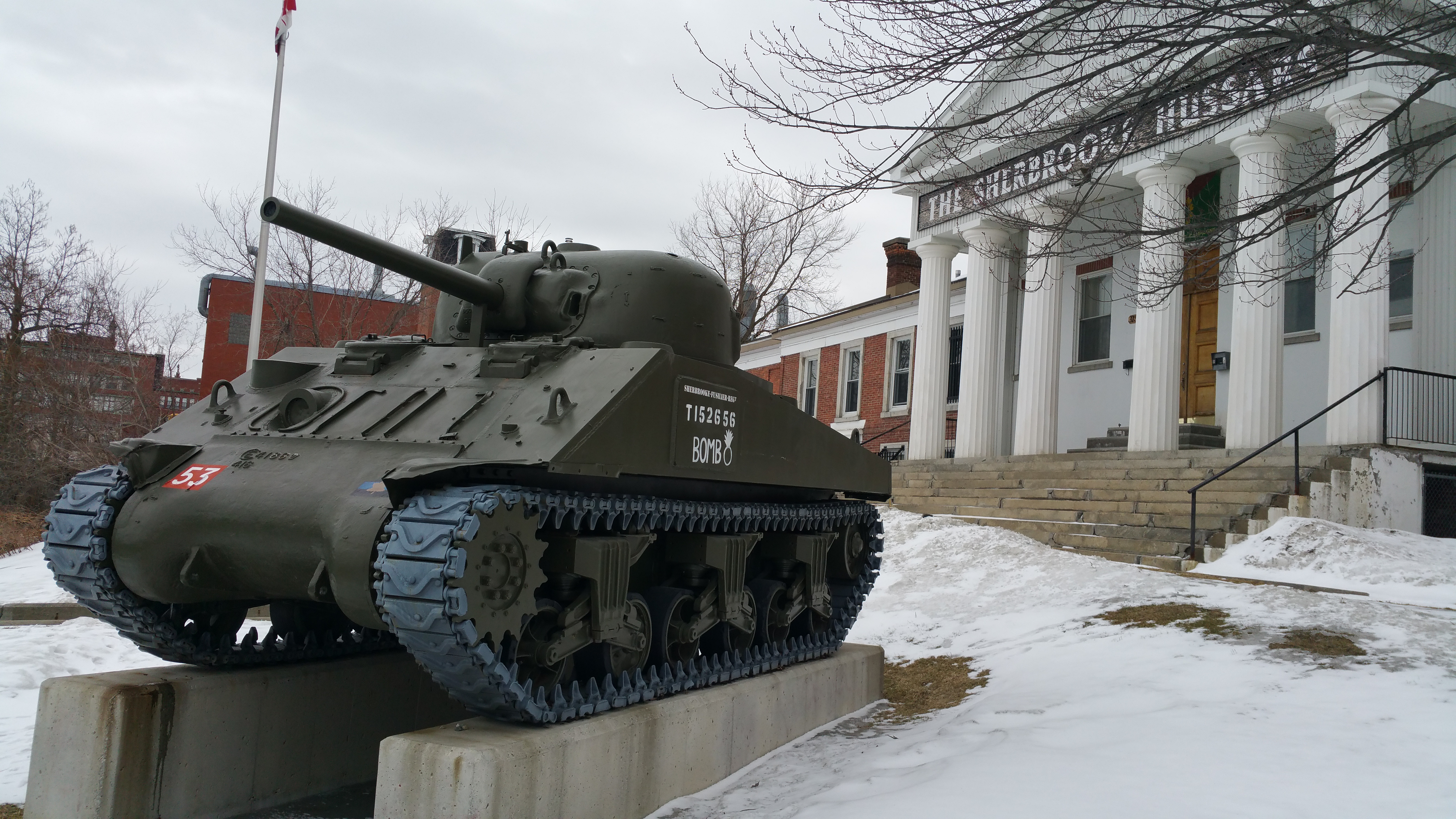
Bomb in Sherbrooke, Quebec 2015.

The most important regimental artifact is Bomb, a Sherman III tank, (Note: British Commonwealth designation of the M4A2 Sherman) War Department registration T152656. This tank survived from D-Day to VE-Day without being knocked out, an improbable achievement given the high casualty rate amongst front-line combat equipment. It may have arrived, along with 26 other new tanks, on 9 May 1944 replacing Rams and M3 Grants that had been used in training since 1942. The tanks went to B Squadron.

In the course of the war Bomb fired over 6,000 rounds and surviving at least one shell impact. After the war Bomb was on display at the Champs de Mars Park, Queen Boulevard North in Sherbrooke. In 2003, it received expert refinishing and repainting by Canadian Forces maintainers from CFB Valcartier, but by 2011 that work had deteriorated, and Bomb was removed from her plinth. Extensive cleaning and repainting with the correct markings was completed at 202 Workshop Depot in Longue-Pointe Garrison, and in September 2011 Bomb was relocated to the front lawns of the William Street Armoury in Sherbrooke.

Bomb was the subject of a Canadian Army Film and Photographic Unit production entitled Green Fields Beyond (number 2090) in 1945. The film covers the crew receiving and naming Bomb. The tank is shown waterproofed for D-Day, loaded onto a landing craft. The film includes footage of the first wave landing at Bernières-sur-Mer and Courseulles-sur-Mer. Additional footage includes the Sherbrookes fighting at Falaise in August, Calcar in February, and into liberated Netherlands. It finishes with Bomb turned-in but arriving at the Port of Halifax with the disembarking troops.
