= Sydney Valpy Radley-Walters =

Canadian tank ace (1920-2015)

Sydney Valpy Radley-Walters CMM DSO MC CD
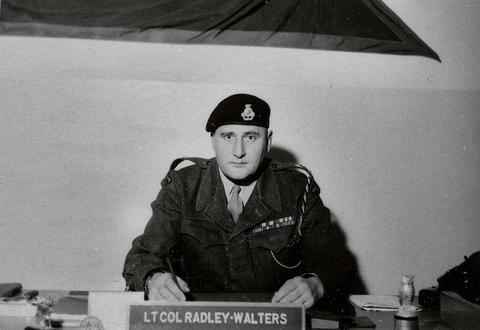
- Walters in uniform
- Born: January 11, 1920; Gaspé, Quebec, Canada
- Died: April 21, 2015 (aged 95); Kingston, Ontario, Canada
- Military career
- Allegiance: Canada
- Branch: Canadian Army
- Rank: Brigadier General
- Nickname: Rad
- Unit: Sherbrooke Fusilier Regiment
- Commands: 8th Canadian Hussars (Princess Louise's)
- Awards: Order of Military Merit; Distinguished Service Order; Military Cross; Canadian Forces' Decoration

Sydney Valpy Radley-Walters CMM, DSO, MC, CD, nicknamed "Rad" (January 11, 1920 – April 21, 2015), was a tank commander in the Canadian Army. Credited with destroying 18 German tanks and many other armoured vehicles, he was the leading Western Allies' tank ace of the Second World War.

== Early life ==
Radley-Walters was born in Gaspé, Quebec in 1920, the son and grandson of Anglican ministers. He graduated from Bishop's College School and Bishop's University in 1940.

== Military career ==
Radley-Walters was commissioned a second lieutenant in the Sherbrooke Fusilier Regiment in October 1940. The regiment was redesignated the 27th Armoured Regiment (The Sherbrooke Fusilier Regiment) in January 1942 and embarked for England in October 1942. The regiment was part of the 2nd Canadian Armoured Brigade, supporting the 3rd Canadian Infantry Division landing in Normandy on D-Day 6 June 1944. Radley-Walters commanded a Sherman tank during the Battle of Normandy. On D-Day + 1, in fighting with the 12th SS Panzer Division, near Saint-Germain-la-Blanche-Herbe, Radley-Walters had his first kill, a Panzer IV. Radley-Walters commanded a tank squadron in the regiment. His unit may have killed "tank ace" Michael Wittmann of the 101st SS Heavy Panzer Battalion, though there is no definitive proof. This claim has been disputed by 3 Troop, A Squadron, 1st Northamptonshire Yeomanry tank regiment gunner Joe Ekins, who also claims to have killed Wittmann. The investigative TV program Battlefield Mysteries investigated the competing claims and concluded that, based on the measured ranges and location of the strike on Wittman's tank, one of the Sherbrooke tanks was probably responsible. Their position was 150m from Wittman, and on the same side as the strike. The Northamptonshire tanks were over a kilometer away and on the opposite side. However the show has been criticized by historians for its lack of evidence to prove its conclusions, it is based largely on the postulations put forward by Canadian author Brian Reid in 2005. There are also significant discrepancies with the 1985 investigation conducted by After the Battle publication, which was based largely on the detailed account of the battle recorded in the 1st Northamptonshire Yeomanry War Diary and eye witness accounts.

Radley-Walters was awarded both the Distinguished Service Order and the Military Cross and for his outstanding leadership and gallantry as a squadron commander. He had three tanks destroyed while he was in command of them and was wounded twice. His regiment participated in clearing the Channel Coast in the First Canadian Army, and was too close to the English Channel to be involved in Operation Market Garden. By the end of the war, he was the top tank ace, the ace of aces of the western Allies (and therefore, of Canada), with a total of 18 tank kills and many other armoured vehicles. The British army does not recognize "Tank Aces". From July 1945, he was promoted to lieutenant colonel, and commanded the Sherbrooke Fusilier Regiment as part of the Allied Occupation Force.

After the war, Radley-Walters served on peacekeeping missions in Cyprus and Egypt. In 1957 he became the Commanding Officer of the 8th Canadian Hussars (Princess Louise's). He attended NATO Defence College in Paris and was assigned to the Supreme Headquarters Allied Powers Europe from June 1961 to July 1962. He returned to Canada as commandant of the Royal Canadian Armoured School in Camp Borden. In 1966 he became the Director-General Training and Recruiting at Canadian Forces Headquarters in Ottawa. In June 1968 he was promoted to brigadier-general and took command of 2 Combat Group at CFB Petawawa. In 1971 he became the commander of the Combat Training Centre at CFB Gagetown.

Radley-Walters retired in December 1974. He served eight years as honorary colonel of the 8th Canadian Hussars (Princess Louise's) and in November 1980 became colonel-commandant of the Royal Canadian Armoured Corps. There is a two-part article discussing Radley-Walters' leadership style in the Canadian Military Journal (Vol. 9, No. 4 and Vol. 10, No. 1). He died on April 21, 2015.

In 2004, in recognition of Radley-Walters' extraordinary contribution to the liberation, the town of Buron in Normandy, France renamed a small municipal park in his honour. Parc Radley Walters on the south side of rue des Arromanches, near the five-way intersection of rue Colleville Montgomery, rue de la Liberation and rue de la delle de Renaud. There is a commemorative plaque, benches and several shade trees.

== See also ==
- Lafayette G. Pool, US tanker "ace" of World War II
- Ace (military)

== Sources ==
- Preston, Richard A. (1992), Au Service du Canada: Histoire du Royal Military College depuis la deuxième guerre mondiale (in French), University of Ottawa, ISBN 2-7603-0359-4
- "A Fine Night For Tanks: The Road To Falaise", Ken Tout, Sutton Publishing, 1998, ISBN 0-7509-1730-X
- Zaporzan, Lawrence James (2003), Rad's War, University of New Brunswick, ISBN 0-612-68285-4
- "In Desperate Battle: Normandy 1944", The Valour and the Horror CBC Television 1992
- "Fields Of Fire: The Canadians In Normandy", Terry Copp, University of Toronto Press, 2004, ISBN 0-8020-3780-1
- Whitaker, W. Denis (2004), Normandy: The Real Story: How Ordinary Allied Soldiers Defeated Hitler, Random House, ISBN 0-345-45907-5
- History of the Sherbrooke Hussars, National Defence Canada, archived from the original on 2011-06-14
- The Memory Project, "James V. Love" (accessed 14 January 2015)
- The Maple Leaf (Canadian Forces), "Fourth Dimension", Charmion Chaplin-Thomas, 1970 October 12 (accessed 20 April 2009)
- "The Valour and the Horror", Sydney Radley-Walters (accessed 20 April 2009)
- Operation CALVA Battlefield Study notes, Canadian Land Forces Command and Staff College, 1988.
- Greatest Tank Battles, "The Battle of Normandy" (episode 7), History Television
- The Leadership of S.V. Radley-Walters
