= Sherbrooke Fusiliers =

Sherbrooke Fusiliers may refer to

- Fusiliers de Sherbrooke, a Canadian infantry regiment
- Sherbrooke Fusiliers Regiment, later the Sherbrooke Fusilier Regiment, a World War II Canadian armoured regiment
