= Michael Wittmann =

German tank commander (1914–1944)

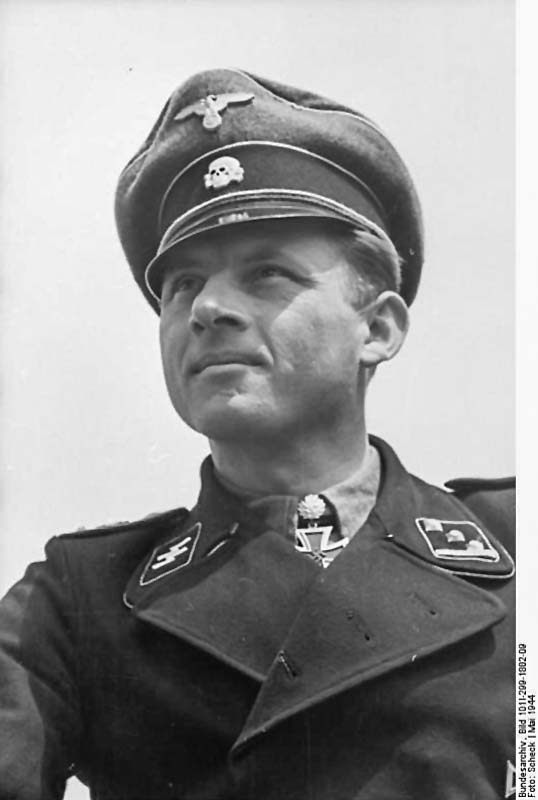
- Wittmann in May, 1944
- Born: 22 April 1914; Vogelthal, Bavaria, German Empire
- Died: 8 August 1944 (aged 30) near Saint-Aignan-de-Cramesnil, Normandy, German-occupied France
- Burial place: La Cambe German war cemetery (reinterred)
- Military career
- Allegiance: Nazi Germany
- Branch: German Army; Waffen SS
- Service years: 1934–1944
- Rank: SS-Hauptsturmführer
- Units: SS Division Leibstandarte; 101st SS Heavy Panzer Battalion
- Conflicts: Eastern Front; Operation Barbarossa; Battle of Kursk; Battle of Normandy; Battle of Villers-Bocage; Operation Totalize †
- Awards: Knight's Cross with Oak Leaves and Swords

Michael Wittmann (22 April 1914 – 8 August 1944) was a German Waffen-SS tank commander during the Second World War. He is known for his ambush of elements of the British 7th Armoured Division during the Battle of Villers-Bocage on 13 June 1944. While in command of a Tiger I tank, Wittmann destroyed up to 14 tanks, 15 personnel carriers and two anti-tank guns within 15 minutes before the loss of his own tank.

Wittmann became a cult figure after the war thanks to his accomplishments as a "panzer ace" (a highly decorated tank commander), part of the portrayal of the Waffen-SS in popular culture. Historians have offered differing assessments of his combat performance. His actions at Villers-Bocage have been praised for their immediate effectiveness, while his tactical judgement was criticised. Historians have further questioned the reliability and significance of his credited tank-kill total and the extent to which his reputation was influenced by wartime propaganda and the battlefield advantages of the Tiger I.

Although the number is disputed, he is credited with destroying 135 to 138 enemy tanks. German tank kills were recorded as a unit. When Hitler personally upgraded Wittmann's Knight's Cross with oak leaves on 2 February 1944, Wittmann's total was 117 tanks.

== Early life ==
Michael Wittmann was born in the village of Vogelthal, near Dietfurt in Bavaria's Upper Palatinate, on 22 April 1914. He enlisted in the German Army (Heer) in 1934 after the Nazi seizure of power.

At the age of 22, he entered his name into the registration lists of his local Schutzstaffel (SS) unit on October 1, 1936. In November of the same year, he was assigned to the 1st Sturm (company) of the 92nd SS-Standarte (SS number 311,623) in Ingolstadt. On April 1, 1937, he transferred to the SS-Verfügungstruppe (SS Dispositional Troops). On April 5, 1938, he began training as an SS-Mann (the lowest rank) with the Leibstandarte SS "Adolf Hitler" (LSSAH) On November 9, 1938, the swearing of allegiance to Adolf Hitler and his promotion to SS-Sturmmann (Note: Equivalent to a Gefrieter in the German Army or a lance corporal in the British Army) took place at the Feldherrnhalle in Münich.

== World War II ==
The Nazi regime pursued a massive armament policy. On 1 September 1939, it began the Invasion of Poland, on 9 April 1940 the invasion of Denmark and Norway and on 10 May 1940 the Battle of France and on 6 April 1941 the Balkans campaign.

=== Eastern Front ===
In the spring of 1941, Wittmann's unit was transferred to the Eastern Front for Operation Barbarossa, the planned invasion of the Soviet Union. He was assigned to SS Panzer Regiment 1, a tank unit, where he commanded a StuG III assault gun/tank destroyer and a Panzer III medium tank. By 1943, he commanded a Tiger I tank, and had become a platoon leader in the heavy company by the time Operation Citadel and the Battle of Kursk took place.

Attached to the LSSAH, Wittmann's platoon of four Tigers reinforced the division's reconnaissance battalion to screen the division's left flank. On their first day in battle at Kursk, Wittmann and his crew were credited with eight tanks and seven anti-tank guns destroyed. At one point, his tank survived a collision with a burning T-34.

In November 1943, Wittmann, still serving in Leibstandarte’s heavy company, was involved in armored counterattacks against Soviet troops around Zhitomir. On their first day in action against these troops, Wittmann's crew claimed the destruction of ten T-34s and five anti-tank guns. “By early January 1944 his combined total of destroyed tanks would rise to sixty-six.”

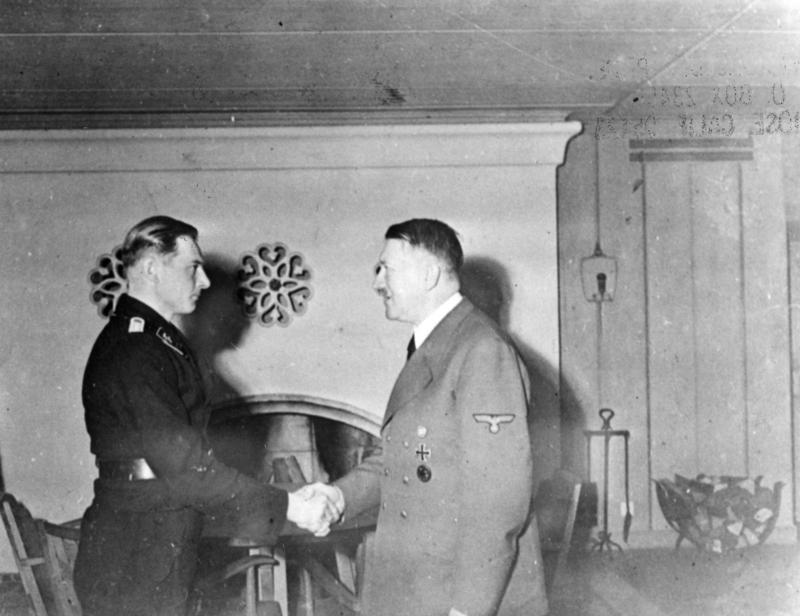
Wittmann receiving the Swords to his Knight's Cross of the Iron Cross from Adolf Hitler in January 1944

On 14 January 1944, Wittmann was awarded the Knight's Cross of the Iron Cross. The presentation was made by his divisional commander, SS-Oberführer Theodor Wisch, who nominated him for the Knight's Cross of the Iron Cross with Oak Leaves. Wittmann was awarded the Oak Leaves on 30 January for the claimed destruction of 117 tanks, making him the 380th member of the German armed forces to receive it. He received the award from Adolf Hitler, who presented it to him at the Wolf's Lair, his headquarters in Rastenburg, on 2 February 1944.

=== Normandy ===
In April 1944, the LSSAH's Tiger Company was transferred to SS Heavy Panzer Battalion 101. This battalion was assigned to the I SS Panzer Corps as a corps asset, and was never permanently attached to any division or regiment. Wittmann was appointed commander of the battalion's second company, and held the rank of SS-Obersturmführer. On 7 June, the day after the Allied Invasion of Normandy began, the battalion was ordered to move from Beauvais to Normandy. The move, covering 165 km (105 miles), took five days to complete.

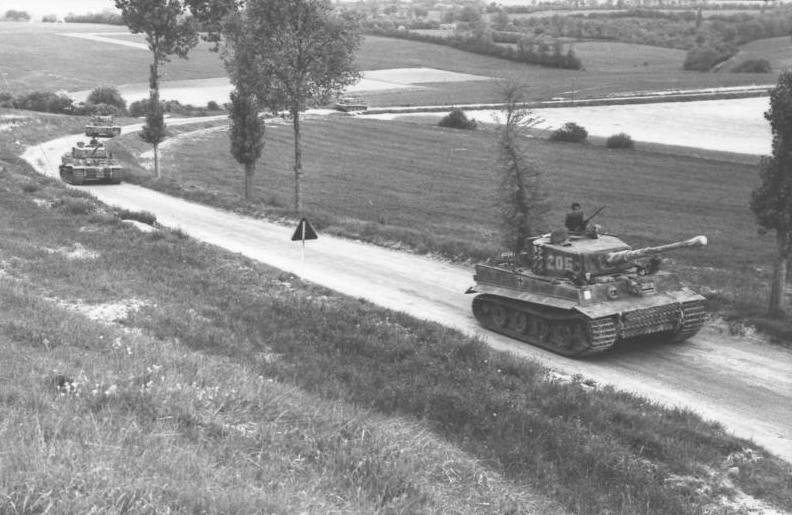
Wittmann's company, 7 June 1944, en route to Morgny. Wittmann is standing in the turret of Tiger 205.

Due to the Anglo-American advance south from Gold and Omaha Beaches, the German 352nd Infantry Division began to buckle. As the division withdrew south, it opened a 12 km (a 7.5-mile) gap in the front line near Caumont-l'Éventé. Sepp Dietrich, commander of 1st SS Panzer Corps, ordered Heavy SS-Panzer Battalion 101, his only reserve, to position itself behind the Panzer Lehr Division and SS Division Hitlerjugend. From this position, the battalion could protect the developing open left flank.

Anticipating the importance the British would assign to the high ground near Villers-Bocage, Wittmann's company was positioned near the town. It arrived late on 12 June. Nominally composed of 12 tanks, his company was 50 per cent understrength with only six tanks due to losses and mechanical failures on the hundred-mile road march from the assembly area at Beauvais.

The next morning, lead elements of the British 7th Armoured Division entered Villers-Bocage. Their objective was to exploit the gap in the front line, seize Villers-Bocage, and capture the nearby ridge (Point 213) in an attempt to force a German withdrawal. Wittmann had not expected them to arrive so soon and had no time to assemble his company. "Instead I had to act quickly, as I had to assume that the enemy had already spotted me and would destroy me where I stood." Having ordered the rest of the company to hold its ground, he set off with one tank.

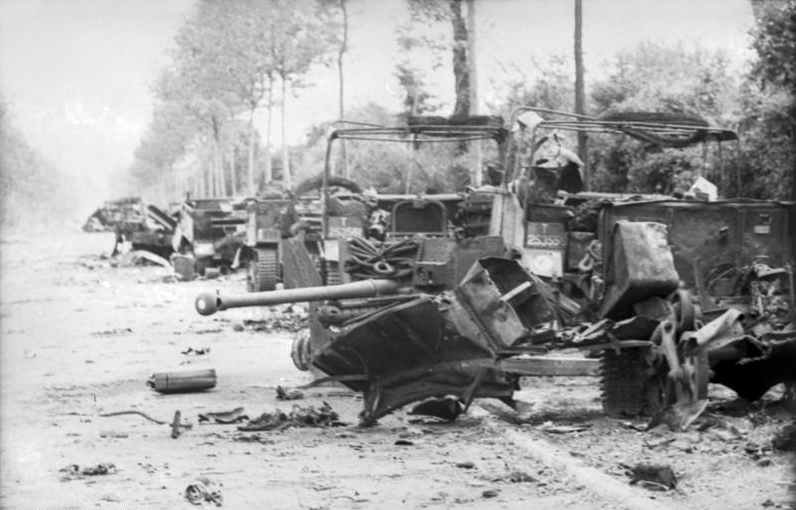
The wreckage of the British transport column Wittmann engaged, including an anti-tank gun in the foreground.

At approximately 09:00, Wittmann's Tiger emerged from cover onto the main road, Route Nationale 175, and engaged the rearmost British tanks positioned on Point 213, destroying them. Wittmann then moved towards Villers-Bocage, shooting several unarmed transport vehicles parked along the roadside. The carriers burst into flames as their fuel tanks were ruptured by machine gun and high explosive fire. Moving into the eastern end of the town, he engaged several light tanks, followed by medium tanks.

Alerted to Wittmann's actions, light tanks in the middle of the town quickly got off the road, while medium tanks were brought forward. Wittmann, meanwhile, had destroyed another British tank and two artillery observation post (OP) tanks, (Note: Used as mobile protection for artillery spotting and "one of which had a dummy wooden gun") followed by a scout car and a half-track.

Accounts differ slightly as to what happened next. Historians record that, after destroying the OP tanks, Wittmann duelled briefly without success with a Sherman Firefly before withdrawing. His Tiger is then reported to have continued eastwards to the outskirts of the town before being disabled by an anti-tank gun. However, Wittmann said his tank was disabled by an anti-tank gun in the town centre.

In less than 15 minutes, 13 or 14 tanks, two anti-tank guns, and 13 to 15 transport vehicles had been destroyed by Heavy SS-Panzer Battalion 101, the majority or all attributed to Wittmann. He played no further role in the Battle of Villers-Bocage. For his actions during the battle, Wittmann was promoted to SS-Hauptsturmführer, and awarded the Knight's Cross of the Iron Cross with Oak Leaves and Swords.

The German propaganda machine swiftly credited Wittmann, by then a household name in Germany, with all the British tanks destroyed at Villers-Bocage. He recorded a radio message on the evening of 13 June, describing the battle and claiming that later counter-attacks had destroyed a British armoured regiment and an infantry battalion. Doctored images were produced; three joined-together photographs, published in the German army magazine Signal, gave a false impression of the scale of destruction in the town. The propaganda campaign was given credence in Germany and abroad, leaving the British convinced that the Battle of Villers-Bocage had been a disaster. In fact, its results were less clear-cut. The Waffen-SS may have fought with distinction during the Battle of Kursk but could not match the army's success, hence Sepp Dietrich's attempts to manufacture a hero out of Wittmann.

=== Death ===
Photograph of the wrecked Tiger 007, taken by French civilian Serge Varin in 1945, still in the field near Gaumesnil where it had been stopped a year before. The hull of the Tiger had been rolled forward from its original position to remove the tracks. It was originally next to the turret.

On 8 August 1944, Anglo-Canadian forces launched Operation Totalize. Under the cover of darkness, British and Canadian tanks and troops seized the tactically important high ground near the town of Saint-Aignan-de-Cramesnil. Here they paused, awaiting an aerial bombardment that would signal the next phase of the attack. Unaware of the reason the Allied forces had halted, SS Hitlerjugend Division Commander Kurt Meyer ordered a counterattack to recapture the high ground.

Wittmann led a group of seven Tiger tanks from Heavy SS-Panzer Battalion 101, supported by additional tanks and infantry. His group of Tigers crossed open terrain towards the high ground, trying to exploit a seam between the Canadian and British formations. They were ambushed by Allied tanks from two sides. On the right or northeast, British tanks from "A" Squadron 1st Northamptonshire Yeomanry and "B" Squadron 144th Regiment Royal Armoured Corps were positioned in woods. To the left or west, "A" Squadron Sherbrooke Fusilier Regiment was located at a chateau courtyard broadside to the attack, where they had knocked firing positions through the stone walls. The attack collapsed as the Canadian tanks destroyed two Tiger tanks, two Panzer IVs and two self-propelled guns in Wittmann's force, while British tank fire destroyed three other Tigers. During the ambush, anti-tank shells fired from Canadian tanks penetrated the upper hull of Wittmann's tank, igniting the ammunition. The resulting fire engulfed the tank and blew off the turret. The destroyed tank's dead crew members were buried in an unmarked grave. In 1983, the German War Graves Commission located the burial site. Wittmann and his crew were reinterred together at the La Cambe German war cemetery in France.

In 2008 a documentary in the Battlefield Mysteries TV series examined the final battle. A historian, Norm Christie, interviewed participants; Sydney Valpy Radley-Walters, Joe Ekins and Ken Tout. From their testimony and the two German accounts, Christie pieced the final battle together. The Tigers left the cover of a hedge near Cintheaux at 12:30 in two prongs; one in the middle of the field with the other – including Wittmann – moving more slowly on the right. The British 75 mm armed tanks engaged the lead Tiger (Iriohn) hitting it in the transmission, bogies or track and it started going in circles trying to withdraw. Joe Ekins' tank hit the second Tiger on the right side and knocked it out. As the crew escaped and brought out their wounded, they watched another Tiger north of them go up in flames (Kisters). Iriohn partly withdrew but could not get away and was hit by Ekins — "the one that was mulling around." Wittmann signalled "Pull back!" He did not realize that a group of the Sherbrookes were immediately to his right, and in a volley they knocked out the two Tigers beside the road. The commander of the second Tiger recalled the position of Wittmann's tank and specifically the skewed turret. The tank blew up shortly afterwards. Hans Hoflinger in a following Tiger was also attacked by enfilading fire from Sherman Fireflies with powerful 17-pounder guns, and had to abandon his tank. He saw the fire and explosion in Wittmann's tank, and that the turret was displaced to the right and tilted down to the front somewhat. None of his crew had gotten out. Survivors from Dollinger's tank passed by the wreck of Wittmann's tank shortly afterwards.

In more recent years the 2008 Battlefield Mysteries documentary has been criticized on grounds of inaccuracy and standard of proof. It is largely based on the postulations put forward by Canadian writer Brian Reid's unsubstantiated claims made in 2005. Much of the show is based on speculation and is at odds with the first Investigation conducted by After the Battle military magazine published in 1985. It was After The Battle that were the first to investigate Wittmann's death and had documentary evidence from the War Diary of the 1st Northamptonshire Yeomanry. This only mentions 3 Tigers in the field, numbers 312, 007 and 314 and it does not mention the Sherbrooke Fusiliers who were supposed to be across the field. In a battle this would have been reported. The documentary has comments from then-Major Radley Walters, who was in one of the Sherbrooke Fusilier tanks. While his tank did not destroy any tanks, they saw the tanks passing by. He does remember a tremendous explosion. According to the documentary, there was a fourth tank, the 009 visible from Ekins position. It cannot be ruled out that a sloppy written 009 can be interpreted as 007 for the war diary.

==== Speculation surrounding death ====
For such a junior officer, an unusual amount of speculation has surrounded Wittmann's death, both as to its cause and the party responsible. Agte states that "the English" could have possibly placed a bounty on him. This is contradicted by Allied records and the testimony of Allied troops involved, that he was not singled out during the battle.

After the war, claims were made by or for the following units as being responsible for Wittmann's death: the 1st Polish Armoured Division, the 4th Canadian Armoured Division, the 144th Regiment Royal Armoured Corps, and the RAF Second Tactical Air Force.

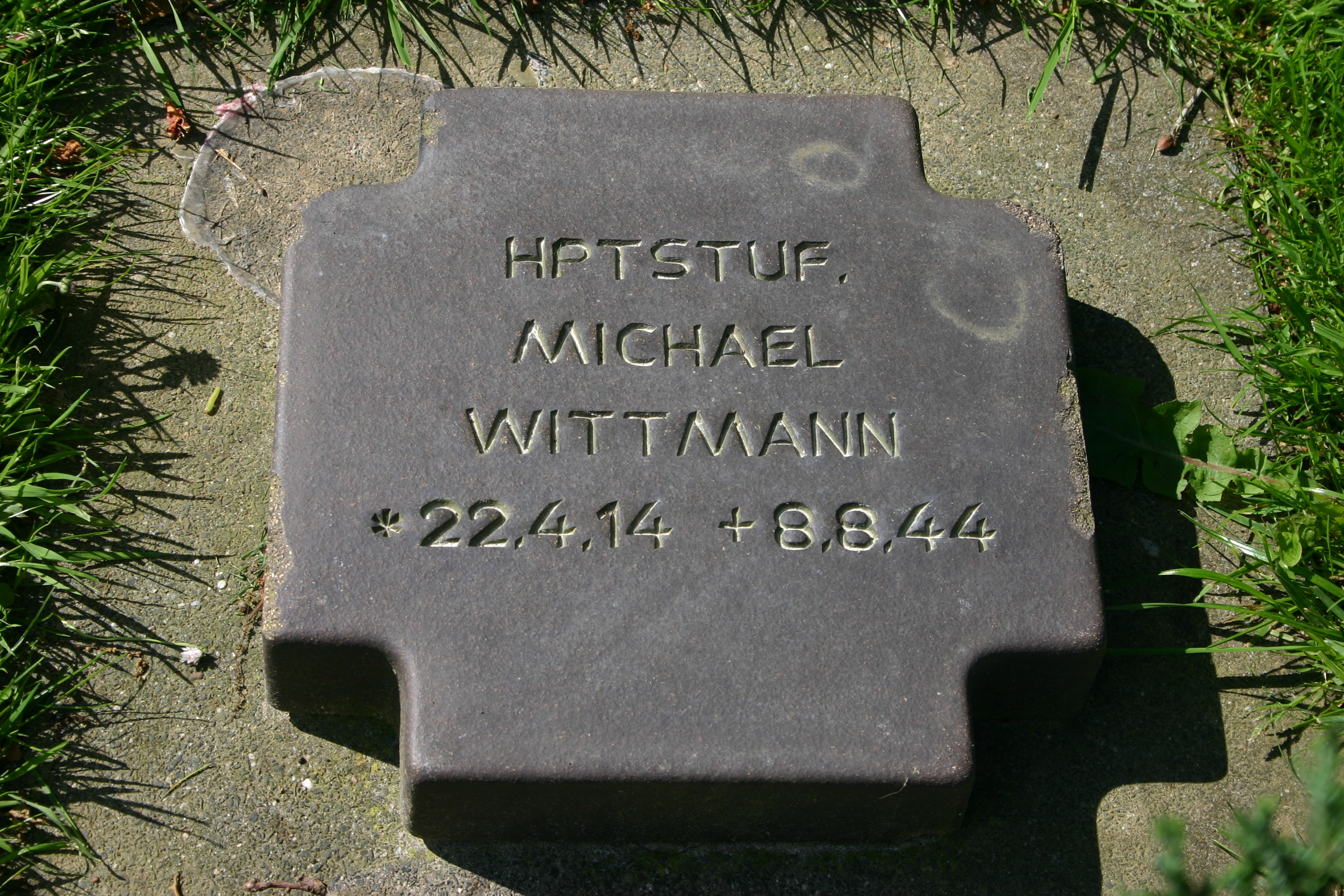
The grave of Michael Wittmann in La Cambe German war cemetery, Normandy, France.

Nazi propaganda reported that Allied aircraft struck Wittmann's tank, stating that he had fallen in combat to the "dreaded fighter-bombers". In a post-war account, French civilian Serge Varin, who took the only known photograph of the destroyed tank, claimed that he found an unexploded rocket nearby and that he saw no other penetration holes in the tank. Historian Brian Reid dismisses this contention, as relevant RAF logs make no claim of engaging tanks in the area at that time. This position is supported by the men of Wittmann's unit who stated they did not come under air attack, and by British and Canadian tank crews who also dismissed any involvement by aircraft.

Prompted by the discovery of Wittmann's remains in 1983 interest in his death was back in the news. In a 1985 issue of After the Battle Magazine, Les Taylor, a wartime member of the 1st Northamptonshire Yeomanry, claimed that fellow yeoman Joe Ekins was responsible for the destruction of Wittmann's tank. Veteran and historian Ken Tout, a member of the same unit, published a similar account crediting Ekins. This became the widely accepted version of events.

According to Hart, Ekins's unit was positioned in a wood on the right flank of the advancing Tiger tanks. At approximately 12:47, they engaged them, halting the attack, and killing Wittmann. The turret numbers of the three Tigers were recorded after the battle in the unit War Diary: 312, 007 and 314. Wittmann's tank was 007.

Pictures of these tanks and their positions were confirmed in photographs taken by French locals and made available to the investigation. These were taken after the war before the tanks were removed for scrap. Brian Reid's account is based on the 1985 ATB investigation but with changes, five Tigers instead of three, the position of Tiger 007 and the Sherbrooke Fusilier's position. There is no documentation to support any of Reid's claims. All of the Sherbrooke Fusilier's records were lost shortly after the battle when an American aircraft negligently bombed the vehicle that contained these documents. There is therefore no documented record for the claims of the Sherbrooke Fusiliers.

Reid postulated the possibility that A Squadron of the Sherbrooke Fusilier Regiment, 2nd Canadian Armoured Brigade, positioned on the left flank of the advancing German tanks, was responsible instead. Commanded by Sydney Valpy Radley-Walters, the squadron's six 75 mm Shermans and two 17-pounder Sherman Fireflies were situated on the grounds of a chateau at Gaumesnil. The unit had created firing holes in the property's walls, and based on verbal testimony engaged the advancing German tanks, including Tigers. The British tanks were between 1,000 metres (1,100 yd) and 1,200 metres (1,300 yd) away from the German line of advance, whereas the Canadian squadron was less than 150 m (500 feet) away behind a stone wall.

Reid argues that due to the Canadians' proximity to the Germans, the elevation of the field between the north south road and Ekin's firing positions, and the firing angle which precisely coincides with the tank round's entry hole in the Tiger, their troops more than likely destroyed Wittmann's tank. Reid supports this with H. Holfinger's account of the engagement. Holfinger was in a Tiger approximately 250 metres (270 yd) behind Wittmann and he said Wittmann's Tiger was destroyed at 12:55. Ekins's crew was credited with the destruction of three Tigers at 12:40, 12:47 and 12:52, Wittmann's tank being allegedly the one destroyed at 12:47.

Considering Holfinger's account, Reid concludes that the Tiger destroyed at 12:47 could not be that of Wittmann. He also notes that the circumstances surrounding the fate of the Tiger destroyed at 12:52 exclude the possibility that it could have been Wittmann's. Reid's account of the battle has come under scrutiny as being speculation, offering no actual proof of the events. He does accept that the documented claims of the 1st Northamptonshire Yeomanry are correct, though there are discrepancies with the 1985 investigation with regard to other details such as the position of Wittmann's tank.

== Assessment as a tank commander ==
Some historians and authors of the late twentieth-century found Wittmann's actions at Villers-Bocage impressive, describing his attack as "one of the most amazing engagements in the history of armoured warfare" (Hastings), "one of the most devastating single-handed actions of the war" (D'Este), and "one of the most devastating ambushes in British military history" (Beevor). Historian Stephen Badsey has stated that the ambush Wittmann launched has cast a shadow over the period between D-Day and 13 June in historical accounts.

With an unverified record of 130 tanks destroyed, Wittmann has been credited as being the top tank ace of the war. Others have noted Wittmann may have been Germany's top tank ace, although Kurt Knispel might have surpassed his tally.

Jim Storr, writing in The Human Face of War, notes that Wittmann's attack on the British regiment at Bocage went beyond just a bad day of tanks losses for the British. He claims that the shock of losses to the British regiment had operational and strategic effect for the operation. Trigg says that in twenty or so minutes, Wittmann and his Tiger basically ended Operation Perch.

With his action in particular at Villers Bocage, A.D. Harvey, writing in Military History, compared him to Sergeant Alvin York, the famed American soldier of the First World War; both single-handedly destroyed large amounts of the enemy. Harvey noted that with a total of 138 tanks and 132 armoured vehicles destroyed, this tally made him the most successful tank commander in military history.

German tank commander and historian Wolfgang Schneider is not as impressed. In analyzing Wittmann's actions at Villers-Bocage, he called into question his tactical ability. Schneider states: "a competent tank company commander does not accumulate so many serious mistakes". He highlights how Wittmann gathered his forces in a sunken lane with a broken-down tank at the head of the column, thereby hampering his unit's mobility. The solitary advance into Villers-Bocage was heavily criticized as it breached "all the rules". No intelligence was obtained, and there was no "centre of gravity" or "concentration of forces" in the attack.

Schneider argues that due to Wittmann's rash actions: "the bulk of the 2nd Company and Mobius 1st Company came up against an enemy who had gone onto the defensive". He calls Wittmann's "carefree" advance into British-occupied positions "pure folly", and says "such over hastiness was uncalled for." He concludes that had a properly prepared assault been launched involving the rest of his company, and the 1st Company, far greater results could have been achieved. Schneider opines that: "thoughtlessness of this kind was to cost [Wittmann] his life ... during an attack casually launched in open country with an exposed flank."

Historian Sönke Neitzel describes Wittmann as the "supposedly most successful" tank commander of World War II and attests to "hero worshipping" around Wittmann. According to Neitzel, numbers of successes, by highly decorated tank commanders, should be read with caution as it is rarely possible to determine reliably, in the heat of battle, how many tanks were destroyed by whom.

Historian Steven Zaloga credits Wittmann with around 135 tank kills and points out that he achieved 120 of these in 1943, operating a Tiger I tank on the Eastern Front. Having advantages both in firepower and in armor, the Tiger I was "nearly invulnerable in a frontal engagement" against any of the Soviet tanks of that time, and Wittmann could destroy opposing tanks from a safe distance. Zaloga concludes that "Most of the 'tank aces' of World War II were simply lucky enough to have an invulnerable tank with a powerful gun." German documents from 1944 state that Allied technology had caught up with the Tiger I and "no longer can it prance around, oblivious to the laws of tank tactics".

Zaloga believes that Wittmann's fate reflected that new reality: after his transfer to France, his crew only lasted two months, and was destroyed either by a British medium tank, the up-gunned Sherman Firefly, or a standard 75mm-equipped Sherman. The 75mm's armour piercing round was more than enough to have penetrated his Tiger's thin rear upper deck armour from less than 150 m (500 feet).

In 2013, British historian John Buckley criticised the accounts which many historians continue to provide of the fighting around Villers-Bocage. Buckley argued that by wrongly attributing the entire German success to Wittmann, "many historians through to today continue to repackage unquestioningly Nazi propaganda". The British Army lost 22 Cromwell and Stuart tanks at the battle of Villers Bocage, but a British counter attack later in the day ended with the destruction of five Tiger I tanks, and up to eight Panzer IV tanks.

== Awards ==
- Iron Cross (1939) 2nd Class (12 July 1941) & 1st Class (8 September 1941)
- Panzer Badge in Silver
- Knight's Cross of the Iron Cross with Oak Leaves and Swords
  - Knight's Cross on 14 January 1944
  - Oak Leaves on 30 January 1944
  - Swords on 22 June 1944

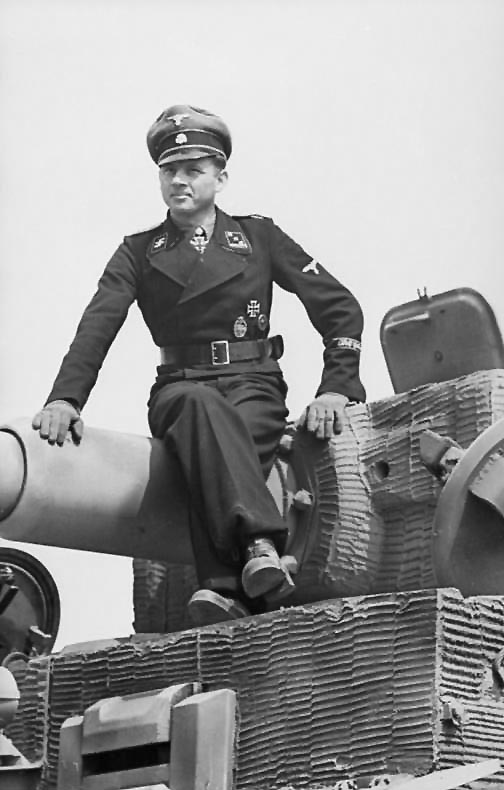
Michael Wittmann sitting on top of a Tiger I, Northern France, May 1944

== Personal life ==
Wittmann married Hildegard Burmeister on March 1, 1944 – the two had first met in 1942. They were married in the chapel of the Lüneburg town hall by a civil magistrate, in a wedding attend by numbers of SS men (some gave speeches) and Hitler Youth members; the latter forming a choir as well. One of his tank crew, Bobby Woll was his best man and the ceremony was heavily reported on by local media. As a wedding gift, Hitler gave the couple 50 bottles of various kinds of wine.

== In popular culture ==
Wittmann has often been featured in books on the battles in Normandy. Several websites are dedicated to him, along with books by authors such as Patrick Agte and Franz Kurowski. Agte is an author and publisher affiliated with the pro-Waffen-SS revisionist history group HIAG, while Kurowski was a prolific author who lauded decorated Waffen-SS men.

=== Cult status ===
Wittmann became a cult figure after the war thanks to his accomplishments as a "panzer ace" (a highly decorated tank commander) in the portrayal of the Waffen-SS in popular culture. Historian Stephen Hart said that "the Wittmann legend [has] become well-established" and "continues to stimulate huge public interest". Military historian Steven Zaloga referred to Wittmann as "the hero of all Nazi fanboys". He discussed the popular perception of a tank-versus-tank engagement as an "armoured joust"—two opponents facing each other—with the "more valiant or better-armed the eventual victor". Zaloga contended that the perception is nothing but "romantic nonsense". According to him, most successful tank commanders were "bushwhackers", having a battlefield advantage rather than a technical one: a tank crew that could engage its opponent before the latter spotted it often came out on top.

Wittmann was featured by Kurowski in his 1992 book Panzer Aces, an ahistorical and hagiographic account of the combat careers of highly decorated Nazi tank commanders. Smelser and Davies described Kurowski's version of the war on the Eastern Front as "well-nigh chivalrous", with German troops "showing concerns for the Russian wounded, despite the many atrocities" of the Soviets against the Germans.

In one of Kurowski's accounts, Wittmann took out eighteen tanks in a single engagement, for which Sepp Dietrich, the commanding officer, presented him with an Iron Cross and inquired whether Wittmann had a request. Without hesitation, Wittmann asked for assistance for a wounded Russian soldier he had spotted. Many similar acts of "humanity" are present in the book, amounting to a distorted image of the German fighting men.

== Notes ==
Citations
