= Operation Totalize =

1944 Allied offensive in Normandy, France

- Part of Operation Overlord
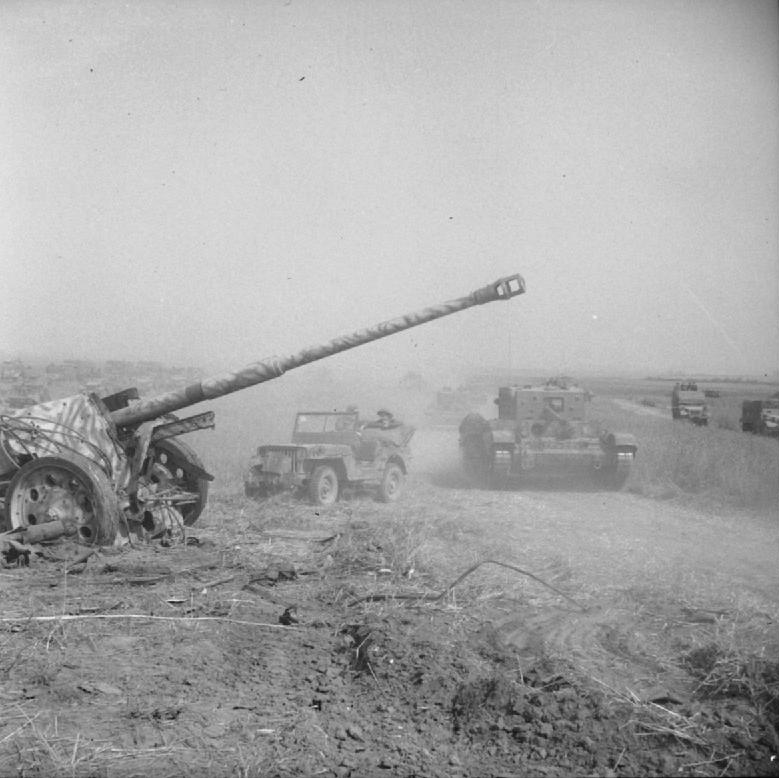
- A Cromwell tank and jeep pass an abandoned German 88 mm anti-tank gun during Operation Totalize, 8 August 1944.
Date	8–10 August 1944
Location	Normandy, France 49°11′10″N 0°21′45″W
Result	Allied victory

Belligerents
Canada; United Kingdom; Poland	Germany

Commanders and leaders
(Canada) Guy Simonds; (Canada) Harry Crerar	(Nazi Germany) Kurt Meyer

Strength
85,000 men; 2,000 aircraft; 720 artillery pieces; 3 infantry divisions; 2 armoured divisions; 2 armoured brigades	3 infantry divisions; 1 SS Panzer division; 1 heavy tank battalion; At least 74 tanks

Casualties and losses
At least 1,256 (Note: Michael Reynolds quoting Stanisław Maczek, places the Polish losses during the operation at 656 men. Copp wrote that Canadian losses included more than 600 men killed.); 146+ tanks (Note: Reynolds claims that the operation cost the Canadians over 80 tanks, while Maczek claims that the 1st Polish Armoured Division lost an additional 66 tanks.)	3,000 casualties (Note: Copp states that German losses are estimated but did include 1,270 prisoners.); At least 45 tanks

Operation Totalize (also spelled Operation Totalise in recent British sources) was an offensive launched by Allied troops in the First Canadian Army during the later stages of Operation Overlord, from 8 to 10 August 1944. The intention was to break through the German defences south of Caen on the eastern flank of the Allied positions in Normandy and exploit success by driving south, to capture the high ground north of the city of Falaise. The goal was to collapse the German front and cut off the retreat of German forces fighting the Allied armies further west. The battle is considered the inaugural operation of the First Canadian Army, which had been activated on 23 July.

In the early hours of 8 August 1944, II Canadian Corps launched the attack using mechanized infantry. They broke through the German front lines and captured vital positions deep in the German defences. It was intended that two fresh armoured divisions would continue the attack but some hesitancy by these two comparatively inexperienced divisions and German armoured counter-attacks halted this offensive. Having advanced 9 mi (14 km), the Allies were halted 7 mi (11 km) north of Falaise and forced to prepare a fresh attack.

== Background ==
Caen had been an objective of the British forces assaulting Sword Beach on D-Day. The German defences were discovered to be strongest in this sector and most of the German reinforcements sent to Normandy were committed to the defence of the city. Positional warfare ensued for the next six weeks. Several attempts by British and Canadian forces to capture Caen were unsuccessful until 9 July, when all of the city, north of the Orne River, was captured during Operation Charnwood. Between 18 July and 20 July, British forces launched Operation Goodwood to outflank the city to the east and south, while Canadian forces mounted Operation Atlantic to cross the Orne River and clear the remaining portions of the city. Although Operation Goodwood was halted with many tank losses, the two operations secured a bridgehead 6 mi (9.7 km) wide and 3 mi (4.8 km) deep south of the Orne.

The Germans retained their hold on the commanding terrain of the Verrières Ridge 5 mi (8.0 km) south of the city. The British and Canadian attacks launched around Caen (in part to distract the Germans from the western part of the front, where the First United States Army was preparing to break out of the Allied lodgement) had caused the Germans to defend Verrières ridge with some of their strongest and most determined formations, including elements of three SS Panzer divisions of the I SS Panzer Corps.

Within 48 hours of the end of Operation Goodwood, the 2nd Canadian Infantry Division launched an attack against the "formidable" German defences on Verrières Ridge. The Canadians suffered over 1,300 casualties and territorial gains were minimal. From 25 July to 27 July, another attempt was made to take the ridge as part of Operation Spring. Poor execution resulted in around 1,500 Canadian casualties. The Battle of Verrières Ridge had claimed upwards of 2,800 Canadian casualties. While the ridge remained in German hands, the 2nd Canadian Infantry Division gained a foothold on the ridge between the village of Verrières to St.Martin-de-Fontenay, which would allow the troops to assemble free of German observation while they prepared to launch Operation Totalize.

On 25 July, the American First Army began Operation Cobra, which after the first two days, broke through the German defences south of Saint-Lô. By the end of the third day of the operation, American forces had advanced 15 mi (24 km) south of the Cobra start line at several points. On 30 July, US forces captured Avranches, at the base of the Cotentin peninsula. The German left flank had collapsed and within 24 hours, units of the US Third Army entered Brittany and advanced south and west through open country, almost without opposition. The 1st SS, 9th SS and 116th Panzer divisions were shifted westward from Verrières Ridge to face this new threat.

General Bernard Montgomery (commanding the ground forces in Normandy), wanted an attack on the eastern flank of the front to capture Falaise, intending that such a move would precipitate a general German collapse. The First Canadian Army (Lieutenant General Harry Crerar), held this part of the Allied front. It consisted of the British I Corps, responsible for the extreme eastern flank of the Allied lines and II Canadian Corps (Lieutenant General Guy Simonds) south of Caen.

Operation Totalize was to be the first major operation conducted by the First Canadian Army. The II Canadian Corps, which was to carry out the operation consisted of the 2nd Canadian Infantry Division, 3rd Canadian Infantry Division, 49th (West Riding) Infantry Division, 51st (Highland) Infantry Division, 4th Canadian (Armoured) Division, 1st Polish Armoured Division, 2nd Canadian Armoured Brigade and the British 33rd Armoured Brigade.

== Canadian plan ==
The German defences on Verrières Ridge remained very strong. The forward infantry positions were well dug-in, with wide fields of fire. The main concentration of one hundred 75 mm and 88 mm anti-tank guns was deployed around the villages of Cramesnil and Saint-Aignan-de-Cramesnil 3 mi (4.8 km) behind the German forward positions, to halt any breakthrough by tanks along the Caen–Falaise road. The front line and defences in depth were held by the 89th Infantry Division, 85th Infantry Division (recently arrived from Rouen) and the remnants of the 272nd Grenadier Infantry Division (severely depleted by the Canadians in Operation Atlantic). The 12th SS Panzer Division Hitlerjugend with an attached heavy Tiger tank battalion, with fifty tanks, was in reserve a further 3 mi (4.8 km) back. Some of the infantry were commanded by the German LXXXVI Korps but most of the sector (and the 12th SS Panzer Division) was under the command of the I SS Panzer Corps, which had arrived in the area during Operation Goodwood.

Simonds knew that infantry assaults supported by massed artillery had failed to overcome the German forward lines in Operation Atlantic and Operation Spring. During Operation Goodwood, a bombardment by aircraft of RAF Bomber Command had assisted British tanks to break through the German front but they had then suffered many casualties from intact German defences arrayed in depth beyond the bombing. Infantry had been unable to follow up quickly enough to support the leading tanks or to secure ground behind them (follow-up units were also slowed). To solve the tactical problem presented by the terrain and the deep defences, Simonds proposed a radical solution, the first large attack by mechanized infantry.

Some field artillery regiments in Canadian and British infantry divisions had been temporarily equipped with M7 Priest 105 mm self-propelled guns for the landings. When they were replaced by towed QF 25-pounder gun-howitzers, these vehicles were superfluous to operations. Simonds had the Priests converted into "Kangaroo" armoured personnel carriers which would allow infantry to follow the tanks closely on any terrain. Permission was first requested from the Americans, from whom the M7s had been borrowed, to convert them into APCs.

Simonds made air power fundamental to his plan for breaking through the German defence zones. The preliminary aerial bombardment called for RAF bombers to saturate the German defences on both flanks of a 4 mi (6.4 km)-wide corridor along the axis of the Caen–Falaise road, during the night of 7 August. During the early hours of 8 August, two attacking forces of tanks and armoured personnel carriers would advance along the corridor. West of the road under the 2nd Canadian Division were the 4th Canadian Infantry Brigade and 2nd Canadian Armoured Brigade. East of the road, under the 51st (Highland) Division were the 154th (Highland) Brigade and the 33rd Armoured Brigade. These two columns would bypass the front-line defenders and capture the main German anti-tank defences around Cramesnil and Saint-Aignan de Cramesnil at dawn.

The second phase would follow immediately. While the remaining four infantry brigades of the 2nd Canadian Division and 51st (Highland) Division cleared up the isolated German forward defences and the 3rd Canadian Division and 49th (West Riding) Division (I Corps) began subsidiary attacks to widen the base of the salient captured in the first phase, the 4th Canadian Armoured Division and 1st Polish Armoured Division would move up the corridor to Cramesnil and prepare to advance further south. To prepare for their attack, bombers of the US Eighth Air Force would bombard the German reserve positions at Hautmesnil. The ultimate objective was the high ground north of Falaise, 15 mi (24 km) beyond the start line.

== First Canadian Army attack ==
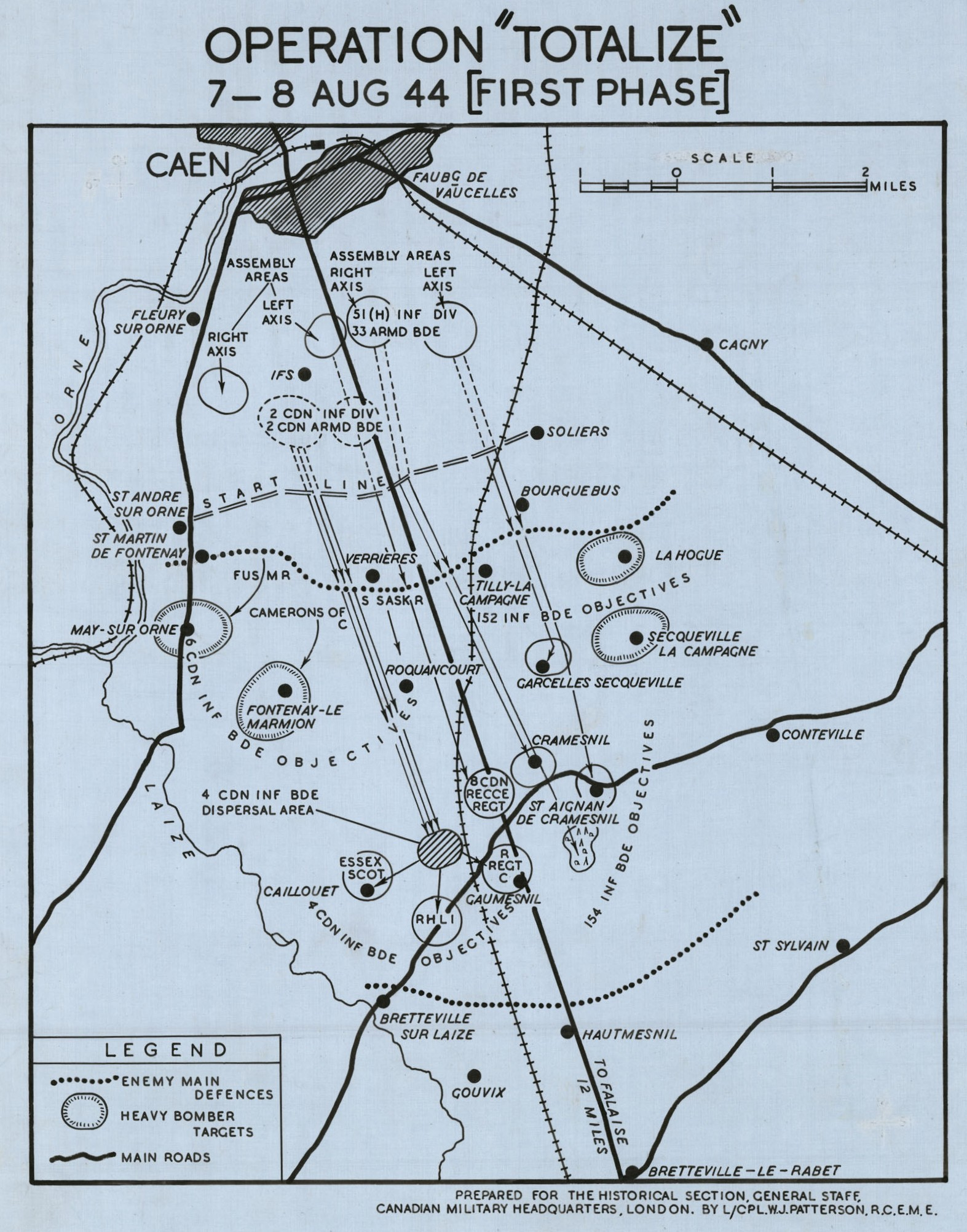
Canadian army map of the first phase of the operation

During the evening of 7 August 1944, the attacking forces formed up in six columns, four vehicles wide, comprising tanks, Kangaroo APCs, half tracks, self-propelled anti-tank guns and Mine flail tanks. At 23:00, Bomber Command commenced the bombardment of German positions along the Caen front. At 23:30, the armoured columns began their advance behind a rolling barrage. Movement was slow at first, many APC drivers became disoriented by the dust caused by the vehicles. Several vehicles became stuck in bomb craters. Simonds had arranged several methods for the columns to maintain direction; some vehicles were fitted with radio direction finders, the artillery fired target-marking shells, Bofors 40 mm guns fired bursts of tracer in the direction of the advance. In spite of all these measures, there was still confusion. Several vehicles collided or were knocked out.

The attack broke through the German defences in several places. By dawn, the attacking columns from the 51st (Highland) Division had reached their intended positions. The infantry dismounted from their Kangaroo APCs within 200 yd (180 m) of their objectives at the villages of Cramensnil and Saint-Aignan de Cramesnil, rapidly over-running the defenders. The columns from the 2nd Canadian Division were delayed by fog and unexpected opposition on their right flank but by noon on 8 August, the Allied forces had captured Verrières Ridge. The novel methods used by Simonds ensured that the attackers suffered only a fraction of the loss which would have been incurred in a normal "dismounted" attack. The Allies were poised to move against Cintheaux, 2 mi (3.2 km) south of their furthest penetration but Simonds ordered a halt, to allow field artillery and the 4th Canadian and 1st Polish armoured divisions to move into position for the second phase of the operation.

== Panzergruppe West ==
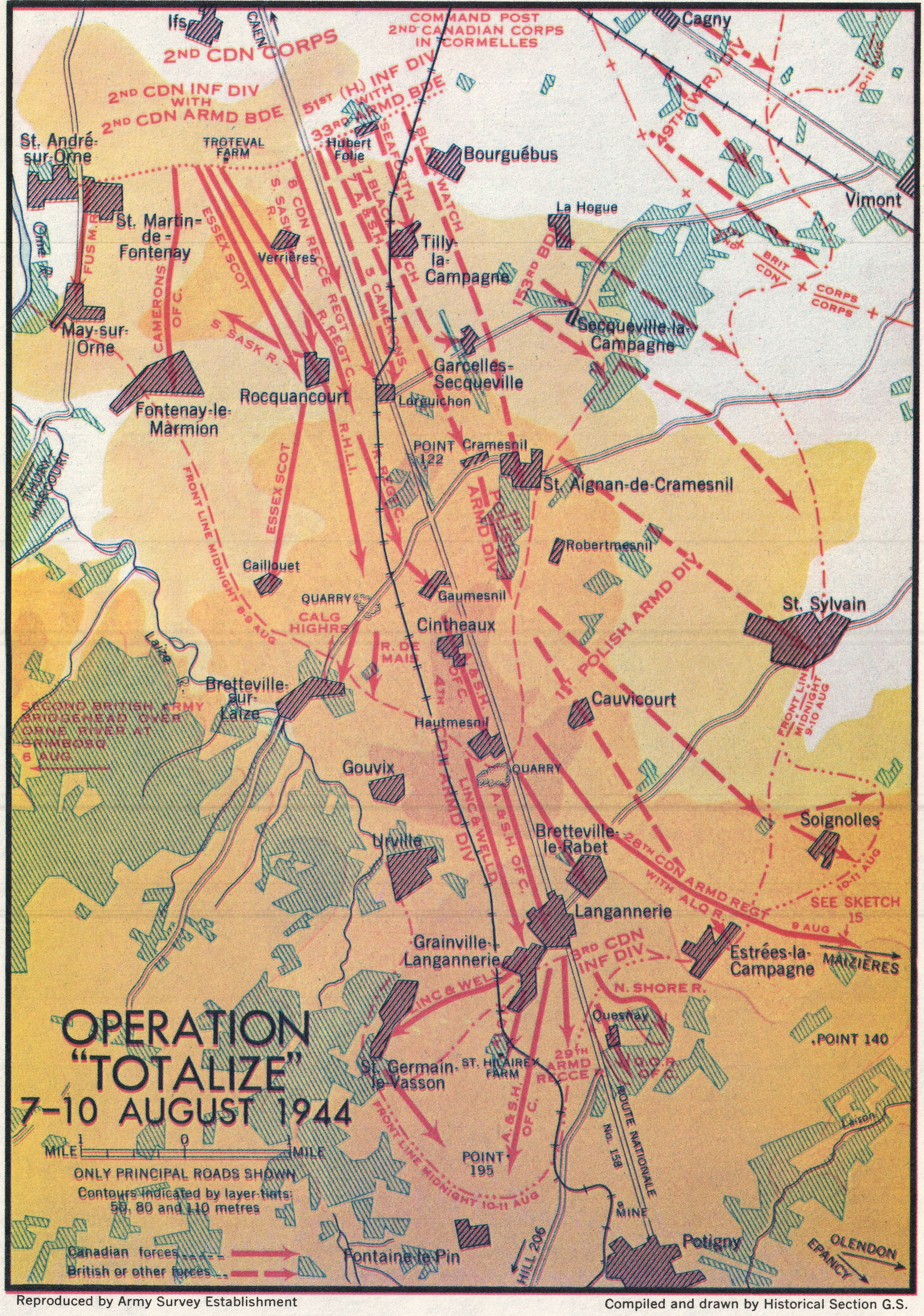
Canadian army map of Allied operations from 7–10 August 1944

SS Brigadeführer (General) Kurt Meyer, commander of the 12th SS Panzer Division, had already ordered infantry from various formations shattered by the bombers and by the armoured attack, to occupy Cintheaux. He also moved forward two battlegroups from his division, consisting of assault guns, infantry and Tiger tanks, positioning them across the Canadian front. Shortly after midday, he ordered these two battlegroups to counter-attack the leading Allied troops. At this point, the Allied offensive plan called for additional bombardment by the Eighth Air Force, before the 4th Canadian Armoured Division and the 1st Polish Armoured Division pushed south towards Falaise on either side of the Caen–Falaise Road.

The counter-attack by the 12th SS Panzer Division failed but placed Meyer's tanks north of the target area that the Eighth Air Force bombarded, ready for the second phase of the Allied attack. Spared the effects of the bombing, the tanks slowed the advance of the 1st Polish Armoured Division, preventing a breakthrough east of the road. West of the road, the German infantry at Cintheaux held up the Canadian armoured formations. Neither division (both on their debut) pressed their attacks as hard as Simonds demanded and laagered (took up defensive positions) while vehicles and troops were supplied and rested when dark fell.

To restore the momentum of the attack, Simonds ordered a column from the 4th Canadian Armoured Division to seize Hill 195, just to the west of the main road, halfway between Cintheaux and Falaise. Worthington Force with B, C and HQ companies of the Algonquin Regiment supporting 52 tanks from the British Columbia Regiment, bumped into the rear of Halfpenny Force fighting the SS in Bretteville-le-Rabet, went round them and lost direction. When dawn broke on 9 August, Worthington Force was 4.5 mi (7.2 km) to the east of Hill 195 at Hill 140, halfway between Estrées-la-Campagne and Mazières. Of the fifteen attacking Allied tanks only two were able to escape. By 17.00 hours what remained of Worthington Force had either been captured or forced to withdraw. (Note: German armoured counter-attacks led notably by SS-Oberscharführer Rudolf Roy.) Because the column was on Hill 140, the wrong objective, other units sent to reinforce went towards the wrong hill. Eventually, another force captured Hill 195 in a model night attack on 10 August; the Germans had been given time to withdraw and reform a defensive line on the Laison River. By 11 August, the Anglo-Canadian offensive had ended.

== Aftermath ==
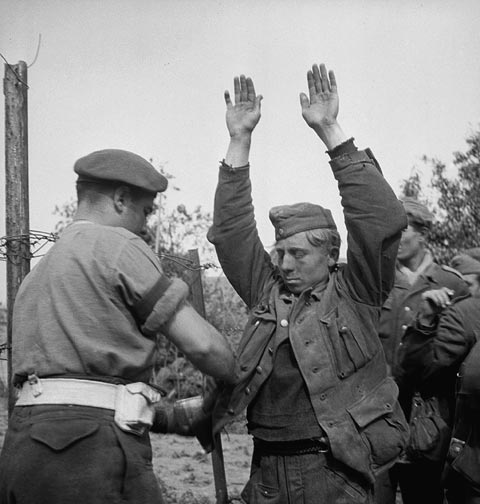
Canadian troops searching German prisoners during the early stages of Operation Totalize.

The early phases of the assault had been a great success, despite many casualties in the two Allied armoured divisions in their attempt to push towards Falaise. Formations of four divisions of the First Canadian Army held positions on Hill 195, directly north of Falaise. At the same time, Allied forces managed to inflict upwards of 1,500 casualties on the Germans. Major General Rod Keller was removed from his command of the 3rd Canadian Infantry Division, after having been badly wounded when his headquarters were hit by American bombs. Keller's poor performance in Totalize lost him the confidence of General Crerar and he received no further command positions for the remainder of the war. Simonds and Crerar mounted a follow-up offensive, Operation Tractable, which took place between 14 and 21 August. On 21 August, the Falaise Pocket was closed when Canadian and Polish units made contact with US troops from the south, ending Commonwealth participation in the Battle of Normandy.

== See also ==
- Joe Ekins
- Sydney Valpy Radley-Walters
- Michael Wittmann

== Bibliography ==
- Bergström, Christer (2014). The Ardennes, 1944-1945: Hitler's Winter Offensive. Casemate Publishers. ISBN 9781612002774.
- Fellgiebel, Walther-Peer (1986). Die Träger des Ritterkreuzes des Eisernen Kreuzes 1939–1945 – Die Inhaber der höchsten Auszeichnung des Zweiten Weltkrieges aller Wehrmachtsteile. Podzun-Pallas. ISBN 978-3-7909-0284-6.
- Bercuson, David (2004) [1996]. Maple Leaf Against the Axis. Red Deer Press. ISBN 0-88995-305-8.
- Cawthorne, Nigel (2005). Victory in World War II. Arcturus. ISBN 1-84193-351-1.
- Copp, Terry (2004) [2003]. Fields of Fire: The Canadians in Normandy. Toronto: University of Toronto Press. ISBN 978-0-8020-3780-0.
- Delaforce, Patrick (2003) [1994]. The Polar Bears: From Normandy to the Relief of Holland with the 49th Division. Sutton Publishing. ISBN 0-7509-3194-9.
- D'Este, Carlo (2004) [1983]. Decision in Normandy: The Real Story of Montgomery and the Allied Campaign. Penguin Books. ISBN 0-14-101761-9.
- Hart, Stephen (2004). Road to Falaise. Battle Zone Normandy. Sutton. ISBN 0-7509-3016-0.
- Perrun, Jody (January 2003). "Best-Laid Plans: Guy Simonds and Operation Totalize, 7–10 August 1944". The Journal of Military History. 67 (1): 137–173. doi:10.1353/jmh.2003.0064. ISSN 0899-3718. S2CID 159737875.
- Reid, Brian (2009). No Holding Back: Operation Totalize, Normandy August 1944. London: Stackpole Books. ISBN 978-0-8117-0584-4.
- Reynolds, Michael (2001) [1997]. Steel Inferno: I SS Panzer Corps in Normandy. Da Capo Press. ISBN 978-1-885119-44-5.
- Roy, Reginald (1984). 1944 – The Canadians in Normandy. Macmillan of Canada. ISBN 0-7715-9796-7.
- Stacey, C. P.; Bond, C. C. J. (1960). The Victory Campaign: The operations in North-West Europe 1944–1945 (PDF). Official History of the Canadian Army in the Second World War. Vol. III. The Queen's Printer and Controller of Stationery Ottawa. OCLC 606015967. Archived from the original (PDF) on 12 September 2008.
- Számvéber, Norbert (2018). Waffen-SS Armour in Normandy: The Combat History of SS Panzer Regiment 12 and SS Panzerjager Abteilung 12, Normandy 1944, Based on their original War Diaries. Warwick: Helion. ISBN 978-1-912174-80-5.
- Van der Vat, Dan (2003). D-Day; The Greatest Invasion, A People's History. Madison Press. ISBN 1-55192-586-9.
- Wilmot, Chester (1997) [1952]. The Struggle For Europe. Wordsworth Editions. ISBN 1-85326-677-9.
- Zuehlke, Mark (2001). The Canadian Military Atlas: Canada's Battlefields from the French and Indian Wars to Kosovo. Stoddart. ISBN 978-0-7737-3289-6.
