= Lafayette G. Pool =

World War II tank ace

Lafayette Green Pool
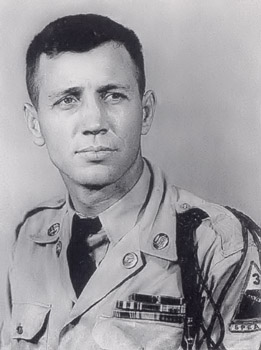
- Lafayette G. Pool in 1949
- Born: Lafayette Green Pool; July 23, 1919; Odem, Texas, U.S.
- Died: May 30, 1991 (aged 71); Killeen, Texas, U.S.
- Burial place: Fort Sam Houston National Cemetery
- Spouse: Evelyn Wright (m. 1942)
- Children: 8
- Military career
- Allegiance: United States
- Branch: United States Army
- Service years: 1941–1946; 1948–1960
- Rank: Chief Warrant Officer 4
- Nickname: War Daddy
- Service number: 38032791
- Units: 3rd Platoon, Company I, 3rd Battalion, 32nd Armored Regiment, 3rd Armored Division
- Conflicts: World War II; Normandy; Northern France
- Awards: Distinguished Service Cross; Silver Star; Legion of Merit; Purple Heart; Army Good Conduct Medal; American Defense Service Medal; American Campaign Medal; European-African-Middle Eastern Campaign Medal; World War II Victory Medal; National Defense Service Medal; French Legion of Honour; French Croix de Guerre; Belgian fourragère; Bronze Saint George Award

Lafayette Green Pool (July 23, 1919 – May 30, 1991) was an American tank-crew and tank-platoon commander in World War II and is widely recognized as the US tank ace of aces, credited with 12 confirmed tank kills and 258 total vehicle and self-propelled gun kills, over 1,000 German soldiers killed and 250 more taken as prisoners of war, accomplished in only 81 days of action from June 27 to September 19, 1944, using three different Shermans. He received many medals and decorations, including the Distinguished Service Cross, the Legion of Merit, the Silver Star, the Purple Heart, the Belgian fourragère, and the French Legion of Honour.

== Early life ==
Lafayette Green Pool was born in Odem, Texas, on July 23, 1919. He had a twin brother, John Thomas, (who served in the Navy during World War II) and a sister, Tennie Mae. Lafayette attended high school in Taft, Texas, graduating in 1938; he later attended Texas College of Arts and Industries in Kingsville, Texas, studying engineering and participated very successfully in amateur boxing. Pool left college after one year when he was inducted into the military in the summer of 1941.

== World War II service ==
Pool was drafted into the United States Army on June 14, 1941, from Fort Sam Houston in his native Texas and assigned to the new 3rd Armored Division. Pool married Evelyn Wright while on leave in December 1942. While undergoing training at the Desert Training Center and Indiantown Gap, Pennsylvania, Pool was noted as a very aggressive sergeant, always wanting the best from his men; he even refused a commission as an officer so he could remain close to the front. Pool was promoted to staff sergeant and deployed overseas with the 3rd Armored Division in September 1943.

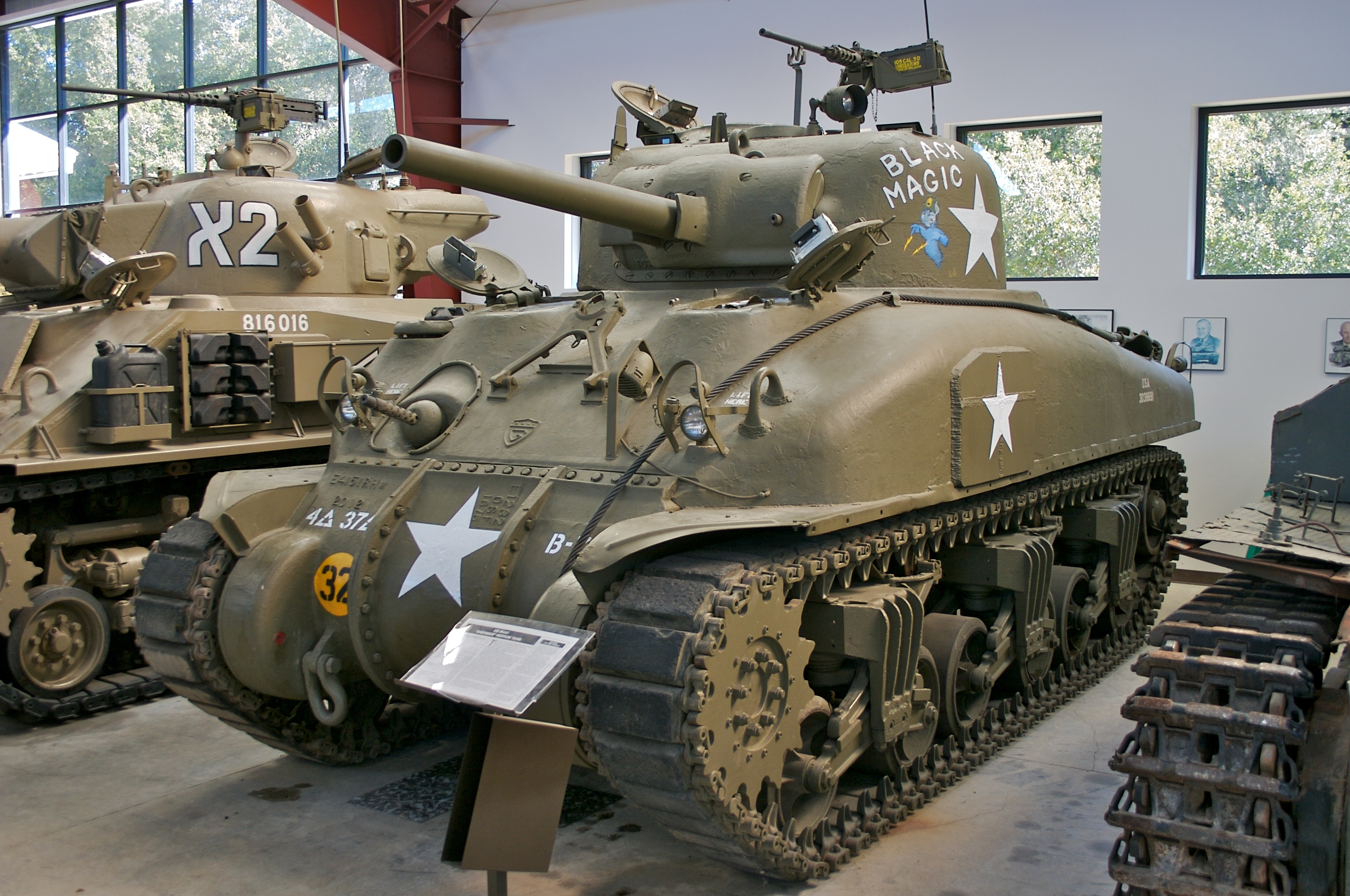
An M4A1 Sherman tank, similar to the first one commanded by Pool in 1944

Pool served with the 3rd Platoon of Company I, 32nd Armored Regiment, 3rd Armored Division, in France between June and September 1944. He successively commanded three Sherman tanks; an M4A1, and two M4A1(76)Ws, all of which bore the nickname "IN THE MOOD" (they were not suffixed with a letter or Roman numeral). He kept the same crew throughout the majority of the war. Corporal Wilbert "Red" Richards was the driver, Private First Class Bertrand "School Boy" Close the assistant driver and bow gunner, Corporal Willis "Ground Hog" Oller the gunner, and Technician Fifth Grade Delbert "Jailbird" Boggs the loader.

Pool's first tank, an M4A1, lasted from June 23 until June 29, when Combat Command A (CCA) attacked for the first time at Villiers-Fossard. It was hit by a Panzerfaust, forcing Pool and his crew to bail out of the stricken tank. His second tank, his first M4A1(76)W, lasted from around July 1 to August 17, when he was leading CCA in clearing remaining German forces from the village of Fromental. This tank was knocked out by friendly fire from a Lockheed P-38 Lightning. His third and last tank, another M4A1(76)W, was destroyed on the night of September 19, 1944, while CCA was attempting to penetrate the Siegfried Line at Münsterbusch, southeast of Aachen, Germany. The tank was hit by an ambushing Panther, and while Pool's driver was trying to back his damaged Sherman up, the Panther hit it a second time. Positioned precariously on the edge of a ditch, the tank was tipped over by the second round. The round killed Pool's replacement gunner, Private First Class Paul Kenneth King, (Corporal Oller had been temporarily transferred back to the United States) and threw Pool out of the commander's hatch, severely injuring him in the leg with shrapnel. The leg was so badly mangled that it later had to be amputated eight inches (20 cm) above the knee. As a result, Pool would not return to amateur boxing after the war.

== Honors and awards ==
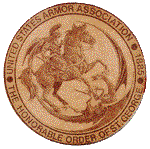
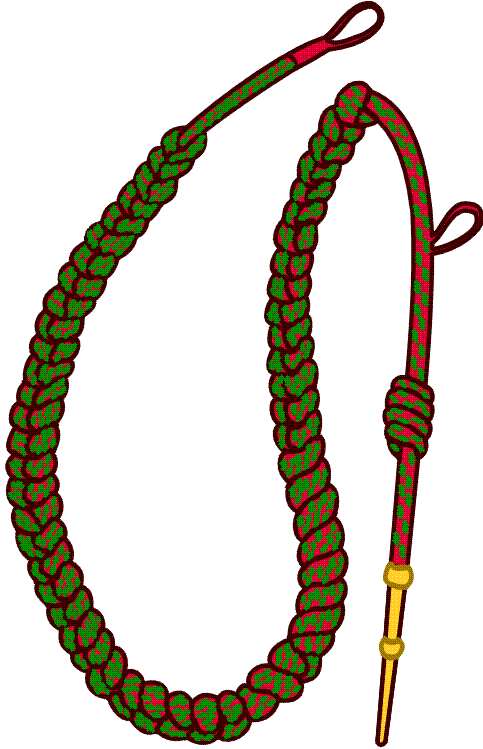

Bronze Order of Saint George Medallion	Belgian fourragère	
Distinguished Service Cross	Silver Star Medal	Legion of Merit
Purple Heart	Army Good Conduct Medal	American Defense Service Medal
American Campaign Medal	European-African-Middle Eastern Campaign Medal with two 3/16" bronze stars	World War II Victory Medal
National Defense Service Medal	French Legion of Honour grade of chevalier	French Croix de Guerre with bronze star

== Later life and death ==
After 22 months of rehabilitation and being fitted with a prosthesis, Pool opened a filling station and garage at his home in Sinton, Texas, followed by several other businesses, before he re-enlisted in the Army and went into the Transportation Corps. With the intervention of General Roderick R. Allen, he finally managed to "come home" to the 3rd Armored Division in 1948, where he became an instructor in automotive mechanics.

He retired from the U.S. Army on September 19, 1960, with the rank of Chief Warrant Officer Two at Fort Sam Houston, Texas. Afterwards he went to business college, followed by a job as a preacher for $25.00 a week. He also coached Little League Baseball.

Pool died in his sleep on May 30, 1991, in Killeen, Texas, at the age of 71. He is interred at Fort Sam Houston National Cemetery in San Antonio, Texas. He was survived by his wife Evelyn, four sons and four daughters.

His son, Captain Jerry Lynn Pool, Sr., was declared missing in action during the Vietnam War in 1970. According to the U.S. Army, on March 24, 1970, Captain Pool was a team leader in the 5th Special Forces Group, and was being extracted by a Bell UH-1 Iroquois helicopter from 14 miles inside Ratanakiri province in Cambodia. As the helicopter began its ascent, it was hit by enemy fire, exploded, and crashed, killing Pool and six other soldiers instantly. Pool's remains were recovered on April 12, 1995, and identified on June 20, 2001. He is buried in Arlington National Cemetery.

== See also ==
- Sydney Valpy Radley-Walters – tanker ace of aces for the World War II Western Front Allies
- Tank ace
