= Garcelles-Secqueville =

- Part of Le Castelet
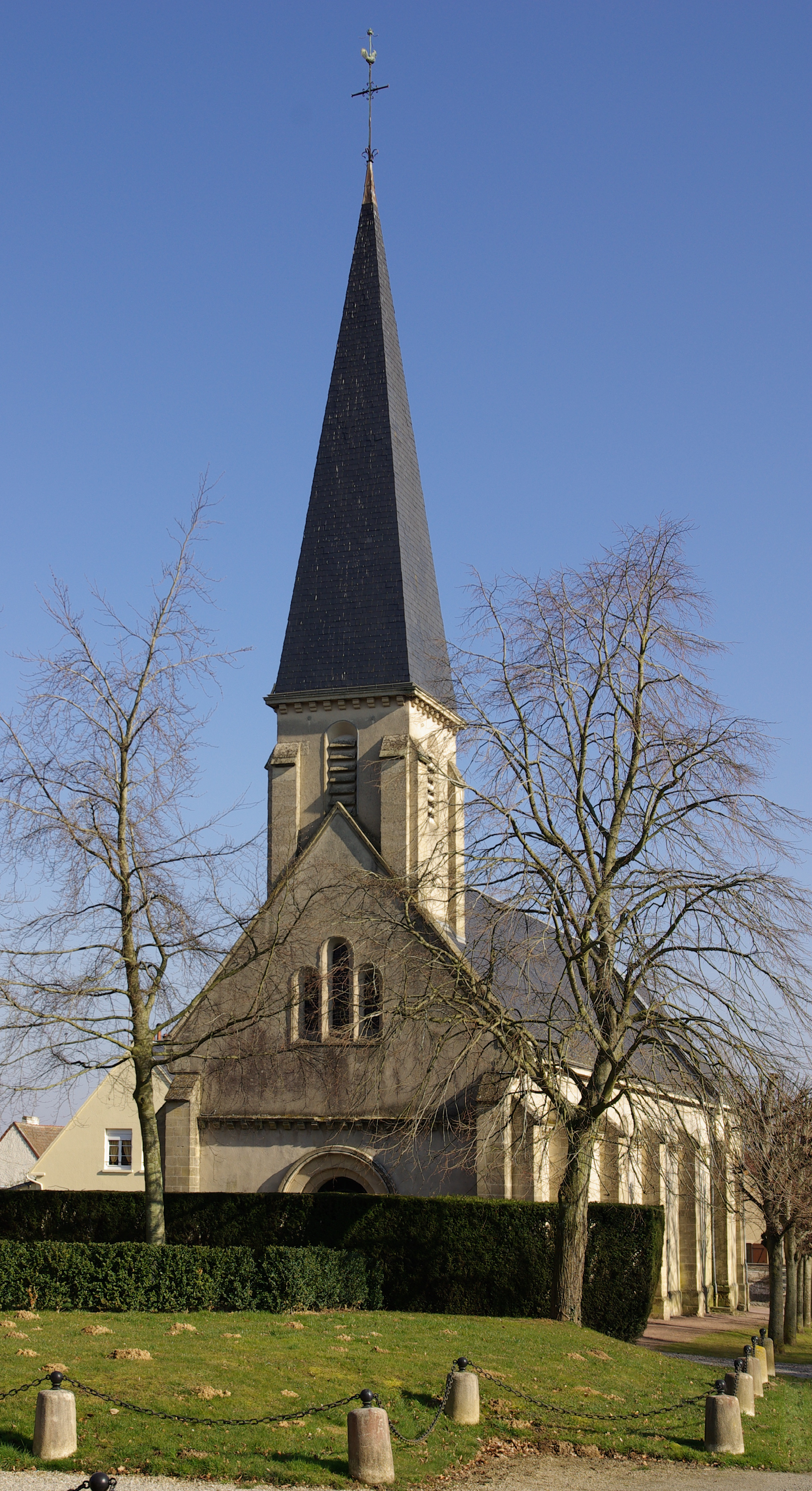
- The church in Garcelles-Secqueville
- Location of Garcelles-Secqueville
- Location within France Location within Normandy
- Coordinates: 49°05′57″N 0°17′19″W
- Country: France
- Region: Normandy
- Department: Calvados
- Arrondissement: Caen
- Canton: Évrecy
- Commune: Le Castelet
- Area^{1}: 5.64 km^{2} (2.18 sq mi)
- Elevation: 79 m (259 ft)
- Highest elevation: 105 m (344 ft)
- Lowest elevation: 57 m (187 ft)
- Population (2022): 1,115
  - Density: 198/km^{2} (512/sq mi)
- Time zone: UTC+01:00 (CET)
  - Summer (DST): UTC+02:00 (CEST)
- Postal code: 14540
- ^{1} French Land Register data, which excludes lakes, ponds, glaciers > 1 km^{2} (0.386 sq mi or 247 acres) and river estuaries.

Garcelles-Secqueville (French pronunciation: [ɡaʁsɛl sɛkvil]) is a former commune in the Calvados department in the Normandy region in northwestern France. On 1 January 2019, it was merged into the new commune Le Castelet.

== Population ==
Historical population
Year	Pop.	±% p.a.
1962	297	—
1968	318	+1.15%
1975	296	−1.02%
1982	301	+0.24%
1990	408	+3.88%
1999	505	+2.40%
2006	693	+4.62%
2022	1,115	+3.02%
Source: EHESS and INSEE

== See also ==
- Communes of the Calvados department
