= Le Castelet =

- Commune
- Location of Le Castelet
- Location within France Location within Normandy
- Coordinates: 49°04′51″N 0°16′47″W
- Country: France
- Region: Normandy
- Department: Calvados
- Arrondissement: Caen
- Canton: Évrecy
- Intercommunality: CU Caen la Mer

Government
  - Mayor (2020–2026): Florence Boulay
- Area^{1}: 12.55 km^{2} (4.85 sq mi)
- Highest elevation: 119 m (390 ft)
- Lowest elevation: 57 m (187 ft)
- Population (2023): 1,850
  - Density: 147/km^{2} (382/sq mi)
- Time zone: UTC+01:00 (CET)
  - Summer (DST): UTC+02:00 (CEST)
- INSEE/Postal code: 14554 /14540
- ^{1} French Land Register data, which excludes lakes, ponds, glaciers > 1 km^{2} (0.386 sq mi or 247 acres) and river estuaries.

Le Castelet (French pronunciation: [lə kastəlɛ]) is a commune in the Calvados department in northwestern France. The municipality was established on 1 January 2019 by merger of the former communes of Garcelles-Secqueville and Saint-Aignan-de-Cramesnil.

== Geography ==
The commune is made up of the following collection of villages and hamlets, Garcelles-Secqueville and Saint-Aignan-de-Cramesnil.

== Sport ==
The commune has a 27 hole golf course, Golf de Caen Garcelles, which opened in 1989.

== Points of Interest ==
=== National Heritage sites ===
The Commune has two buildings and areas listed as a Monument historique

- église Saint-Aignan de Saint-Aignan-de-Cramesnil thirteenth century church listed as a monument in 1927.
- Ancien château de Cramesnil former chateau listed as a monument in 1932.

== See also ==
- Communes of the Calvados department
