= Northamptonshire Yeomanry =

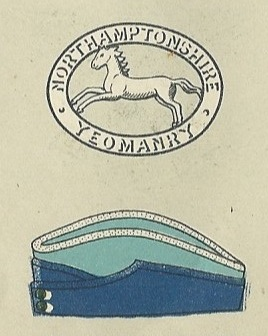
- Badge and service cap as worn at the outbreak of World War II
- Active: 1794–1971
- Country: Kingdom of Great Britain (1797–1800); United Kingdom (1801–1971)
- Branch: British Army
- Type: Yeomanry
- Size: World War I Three Regiments; World War II; Two Regiments
- Engagements: World War I First Battle of Ypres; Battle of Neuve Chapelle; Second Battle of Artois; World War II; Operation Overlord; Operation Charnwood; Operation Totalize; Operation Varsity

The Northamptonshire Yeomanry was a Yeomanry regiment of the British Army, formed in 1794 as volunteer cavalry. It served in the Second Boer War, the First World War and the Second World War before being reduced to squadron level in 1956. It ceased to have a separate existence in 1971.

== History ==
=== Formation and early history ===
In 1793, the prime minister, William Pitt the Younger, proposed that the English Counties form a force of Volunteer Yeoman Cavalry that could be called on by the king to defend the country against invasion or by the Lord Lieutenant to subdue any civil disorder within the country. The regiment was originally formed at Althorp, with George Spencer, 2nd Earl Spencer becoming Colonel of the Regiment, as the Northamptonshire Yeomanry Cavalry in 1794, but it was disbanded in 1828. It was raised again as independent troops in 1830 but disbanded again in 1873.

=== Second Boer War ===
A Northamptonshire Imperial Yeomanry regiment was formed during the Second Boer War. The regiment was based at Clare Street in Northampton at this time.

=== First World War ===
In accordance with the Territorial and Reserve Forces Act 1907 (7 Edw. 7, c.9) which brought the Territorial Force into being, the TF was intended to be a home defence force for service during wartime and members could not be compelled to serve outside the country. However, on the outbreak of war on 4 August 1914, many members volunteered for Imperial Service. Therefore, TF units were split in August and September 1914 into 1st Line (liable for overseas service) and 2nd Line (home service for those unable or unwilling to serve overseas) units. Later, a 3rd Line was formed to act as a reserve, providing trained replacements for the 1st and 2nd Line regiments.

==== 1/1st Northamptonshire Yeomanry ====
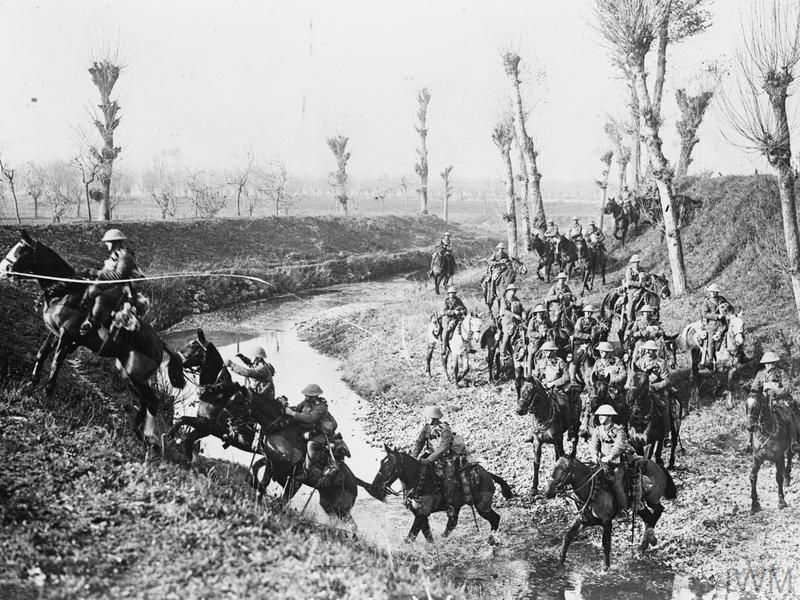
Patrol of the Northamptonshire Yeomanry crossing a stream in Italy, 1918.

On mobilisation in August 1914, the 1st Line regiment was attached to the Eastern Mounted Brigade, which was part of the 1st Mounted Division.

In November 1914, the regiment moved to France with the 8th Division. It remained with the 8th Division until April 1915, when it was split up:

Regimental HQ and B Squadron joined the 6th Division
A Squadron joined the 4th Division
C Squadron joined the 5th Division.

This lasted until May 1916, when the Regiment re-formed, becoming the 6th Corps' Cavalry Regiment. In November 1917, it moved to Italy, becoming 14th Corps' Cavalry.

==== 2/1st Northamptonshire Yeomanry ====
The 2nd Line regiment was formed in September 1914. In November 1915, the regiment joined the 59th (2nd North Midland) Division. In April 1916, the regiment began to split up, with the RHQ and A Squadron joining the 69th (2nd East Anglian) Division in Yorkshire. One Squadron was attached to the 67th (2nd Home Counties) Division in Kent in October 1916. During the following winter, the remaining squadron went to France, where it was absorbed into the Tank Corps around August 1917. Of the two squadrons remaining in the United Kingdom, one was absorbed into the 6th Reserve Cavalry Regiment at Tidworth in March 1917, the other was disbanded.

==== 3/1st Northamptonshire Yeomanry ====
The 3rd Line regiment was formed in 1915 and in the summer it was affiliated to the 3rd Reserve Cavalry Regiment at Canterbury. Early in 1917, it was absorbed in the 6th Reserve Cavalry Regiment at Tidworth.

=== Between the wars ===
On 7 February 1920, the regiment was reconstituted in the Territorial Army with HQ at the Old Militia Barracks in Clare St, Northampton. It was initially established with three Squadrons. Following the experience of the war, it was decided that only the fourteen most senior yeomanry regiments would be retained as horsed cavalry, with the rest being transferred to other roles. As a result, on 1 March 1922, the regiment was one of eight (Note: The eight yeomanry regiments converted to Armoured Car Companies of the Royal Tank Corps (RTC) were: 19th (Lothians and Border) Armoured Car Company, Royal Tank Corps from Lothians and Border Horse; 20th (Fife and Forfar) Armoured Car Company, Royal Tank Corps from Fife and Forfar Yeomanry; 21st (Gloucestershire Yeomanry) Armoured Car Company, Royal Tank Corps from Royal Gloucestershire Hussars; 22nd (London) Armoured Car Company (Westminster Dragoons), Royal Tank Corps from Westminster Dragoons; 23rd (London) Armoured Car Company, Royal Tank Corps from 3rd County of London Yeomanry (Sharpshooters); 24th (Derbyshire Yeomanry) Armoured Car Company, Royal Tank Corps from Derbyshire Yeomanry; 25th (Northamptonshire Yeomanry) Armoured Car Company, Royal Tank Corps from Northamptonshire Yeomanry; 26th (East Riding of York Yeomanry) Armoured Car Company, Royal Tank Corps from East Riding Yeomanry) converted and reduced to 7th (Northamptonshire) Armoured Car Company, Tank Corps. In 1922, it was renumbered as 25th (Northamptonshire Yeomanry) Armoured Car Company, Tank Corps, in October 1923 as 25th (Northamptonshire Yeomanry) Armoured Car Company, Royal Tank Corps, and in April 1939 it was transferred to the Royal Armoured Corps.

In November 1938, the formation of a Mechanised Cavalry Brigade (TA) was announced, to comprise three Cavalry Light Tank Regiments. The Northamptonshire Yeomanry was selected to form part of this Brigade and ordered to expand to full Regimental status. By early 1939, Regimental Headquarters and "A" Squadron were based at Northampton, with "B" Squadron at Daventry and "C" Squadron at Brackley. This expansion coincided with the decision to increase the Territorial Army by forming duplicates of existing TA units. By 1939, it had become clear that a new European war was likely to break out, and the doubling of the Territorial Army was authorised, with each unit forming a duplicate.

As a result of this move, the Northamptonshire Yeomanry was divided in May 1939 to form two Cavalry Light Tank Regiments:

1st Northamptonshire Yeomanry (TA) - Regimental Headquarters and "A" Sqn at Northampton, "B" Sqn at Daventry and "C" Sqn at Brackley.
2nd Northamptonshire Yeomanry (TA) - Regimental Headquarters and "A" Sqn at Northampton, "B" and "C" Sqns at Kettering.

Both Regiments formed part of 20th Light Armoured Brigade (TA) and were mobilised on 1 September 1939. A nominal 4th NY was formed later.

=== Second World War ===
==== 1st Northamptonshire Yeomanry ====
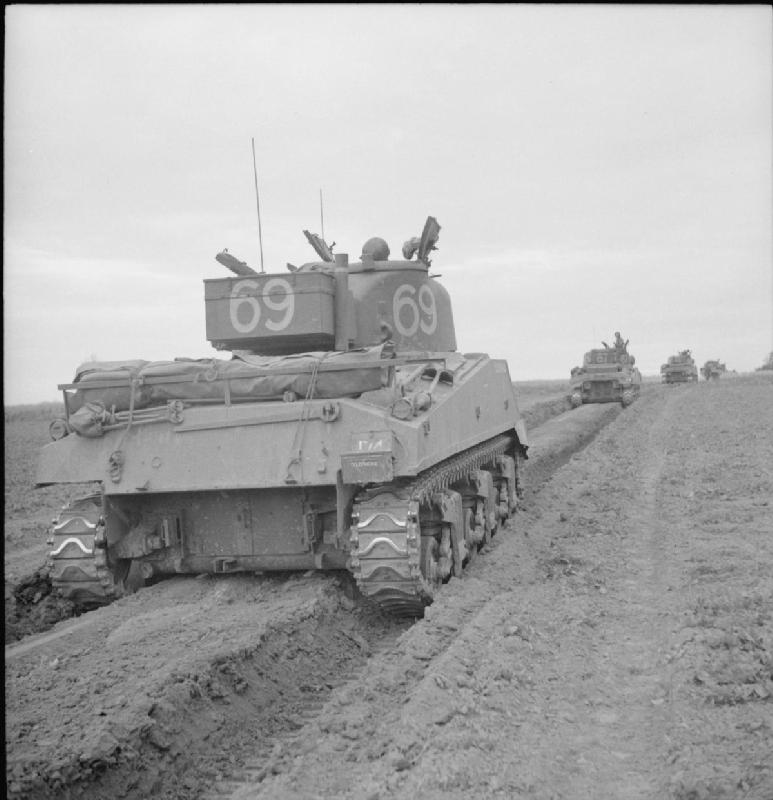
Shermans of the 33rd Armoured Brigade, Operation Charnwood

In 1944, as a part of the 33rd Armoured Brigade, the unit participated in the Invasion of Normandy, landing on Gold Beach in Normandy on 6 June. The brigade also included the 1st East Riding of Yorkshire Yeomanry and the 144 Regiment RAC. The Brigade's role was infantry support, therefore it rarely fought as an entity. One of the occasions when the Brigade did undertake an operation on its own was at Le Mesnil-Patry, Rots on 11 June 1944. Further battles they were involved in were around Caen, including Operation Charnwood on 7 July, the battle to capture Caen. On 16 July 1944, it was involved in Operation Pomegranate, where it come under the command of the 59th (Staffordshire) Infantry Division.

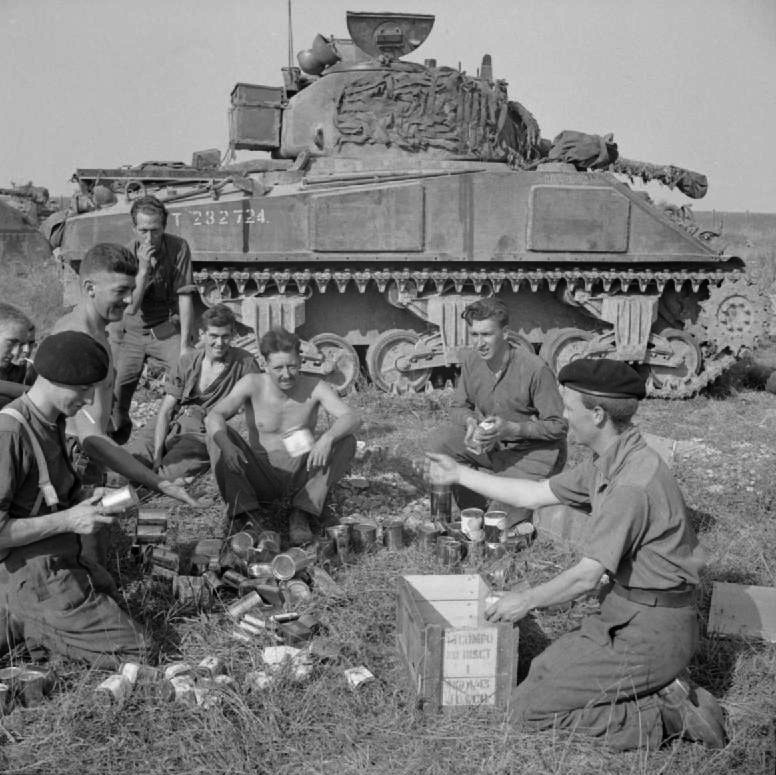
Crew from the Northamptonshire Yeomanry eating rations during Operation Totalize

On 8 August 1944, it was involved in Operation Totalize, a breakout from the Caen Salient. It was during Operation Totalize that Joe Ekins, a Sherman Tank gunner of the Northamptonshire Yeomanry, gained recognition for being the man who possibly killed the renowned German tank commander, Michael Wittmann, the 4th top scoring tank ace in history, near Saint-Aignan-de-Cramesnil, France. The regiment was briefly attached to the 51st (Highland) Infantry Division for the actions around the Battle of the Bulge. The regiment was re-formed and re-equipped with LVT 4 Buffalo amphibious armoured fighting vehicles for the Operation Plunder the Rhine crossing and was placed under the command of the 79th Armoured Division.

==== 2nd Northamptonshire Yeomanry ====
After leaving the 20th Armoured Brigade in 1943, the 2nd Northamptonshire Yeomanry was converted to an Armoured Reconnaissance Regiment and assigned to the 11th Armoured Division. The regiment landed in Normandy in June 1944. In August, it was disbanded and its members were drafted to other regiments.

==== 4th Northamptonshire Yeomanry ====
The 4th "regiment" was formed as a deception unit. It constructed and moved dummy tanks in order to deceive the enemy as to the disposition and strength of British armour. (Note: Other dummy tank "regiments" formed in a similar manner included the 3rd Royal Gloucestershire Hussars and the 37th, 38th, 39th, 60th, 62nd, 65th, 101st, 102nd, 118th and 124th Royal Tank Regiments.)

=== Post-War ===
The 1st and 2nd Northamptonshire Yeomanry (TA) were both demobilised by 1946 and for a short period remained in a state of suspended animation. Then, on 1 January 1947, the TA was reconstituted, the 1st and 2nd Northamptonshire Yeomanry were amalgamated and re-formed as The Northamptonshire Yeomanry, RAC (TA). Reorganisations of the TA in 1956 resulted in the Regiment being reduced to a single squadron as "D" (Northamptonshire Yeomanry) Squadron, part of the Inns of Court Regiment, RAC (TA). This state of affairs lasted until April 1961, when "D" Squadron was transferred to the Corps of Royal Engineers and reorganised to form 250th (Northamptonshire Yeomanry) Independent Field Squadron, RE (TA).

When the TA was reorganised into the Territorial & Army Volunteer Reserve (T&AVR) on 31 March 1967, this unit was reduced to a Cadre with the Regiment being again placed in Suspended Animation. In April 1967, the Cadre of the Northamptonshire Yeomanry formed a successor unit as A (Northamptonshire Yeomanry) Company, The Northamptonshire Regiment Territorials until 1971, when the 7th Battalion, Royal Anglian Regiment was formed.

However, the Northamptonshire Yeomanry Association, established on 6 August 1943, became a Charity in 1945, and was renamed the Northamptonshire Association Yeomanry Benevolent Fund. Under its president, the 9th Earl Spencer, this charity finally closed its doors in December 2024, exactly 230 years after being raised by the 2nd Earl Spencer in 1794.

== Uniform and insignia ==
Upon establishment in February 1902 the regiment was issued with the new khaki uniform then being introduced as service dress for the British Army as a whole. The regimental distinctions for the Northamptonshire Yeomanry included pale blue ("cornflower") facings and piping, plus a cap and collar badge comprising a galloping white horse. This insignia had been part of that worn by the earlier Northamptonshire Yeomanry in the 1830-45 period.

By 1905 a more elaborate dark blue dragoon style uniform with plumed white-metal helmet had been adopted for officers as review order. Braiding on the tunic was silver, as were the shoulder and waist belts. The rank and file wore simpler blue patrols for parade and walking-out dress. All ranks retained the cornflower blue for facings.

== See also ==
- Imperial Yeomanry
- List of Yeomanry Regiments 1908
- Yeomanry
- Yeomanry order of precedence
- British yeomanry during the First World War
- Second line yeomanry regiments of the British Army

== Bibliography ==
- Bellis, Malcolm A. (1994). Regiments of the British Army 1939–1945 (Armour & Infantry). London: Military Press International. ISBN 0-85420-999-9.
- James, Brigadier E.A. (1978). British Regiments 1914–18. London: Samson Books Limited. ISBN 0-906304-03-2.
- Joslen, Lt-Col H.F. (1990) [1st. Pub. HMSO:1960]. Orders of Battle, Second World War, 1939–1945. London: London Stamp Exchange. ISBN 0-948130-03-2.
- Mileham, Patrick (1994). The Yeomanry Regiments; 200 Years of Tradition. Edinburgh: Canongate Academic. ISBN 1-898410-36-4.
- Rinaldi, Richard A (2008). Order of Battle of the British Army 1914. Ravi Rikhye. ISBN 978-0-97760728-0.
