= Joe Ekins =

British soldier

- Born: 15 July 1923; Yielden, Northamptonshire, England
- Died: 1 February 2012 (aged 88); Kettering, Northamptonshire, England
- Military career
- Allegiance: United Kingdom
- Branch: British Army
- Rank: Trooper
- Units: A Squadron, 1st Northamptonshire Yeomanry
- Conflicts: Second World War: Battle of Normandy; Operation Totalize

Joseph William Ekins (15 July 1923 – 1 February 2012) was a British soldier. He gained recognition for his action as a British Army tank gunner in France during World War II, in which Ekins destroyed four German tanks near Saint-Aignan-de-Cramesnil in a day, including three Tiger I tanks (numbers 312, 007 & 314). One of his opponents on that day, 8 August 1944, was the German tank commander Michael Wittmann; whether Ekins fired the round that destroyed Wittmann's Tiger is disputed. Ekins died on 1 February 2012.

== Operation Totalize ==
During Operation Totalize the 1st Northamptonshire Yeomanry and elements of the 51st (Highland) Infantry Division reached the French village of St. Aignan de Cramesnil during the early morning of 8 August 1944. While B Squadron stayed around the village, A and C Squadrons moved further south into Delle de la Roque wood.

C Squadron moved to the east side of the woods and the understrength A Squadron took post in the southern portion, with '3 Troop' on the western edge of the wood. From this position they overlooked a large open section of ground and were able to watch as German tanks advanced up Route Nationale 158 from the town of Cintheaux. On orders from the troop commander, they held their fire until the German tanks were well within range.

Ekins, the gunner of Sergeant Gordon's Sherman Firefly (called Velikiye Luki, as A Squadron's tanks were named after towns in the Soviet Union), had yet to fire his gun in action. With the Tiger tanks in range, the order was given to fire. What followed was an almost 12-minute battle that saw Ekins destroying all three Tigers that '3 Troop' could see (there were seven Tiger tanks in the area heading north, along with some other tanks and self-propelled guns).

A short time later, the main German counter-attack was made in the direction of C Squadron. A Squadron (less Sgt Gordon, who had been wounded and had already bailed out of the Firefly) moved over to support them and in the resulting combat, Ekins destroyed a Panzer IV before his tank was hit and the crew was forced to bail out. After the battle, Ekins was reassigned to another tank within the squadron as a radio operator and remained in this position for the rest of the war.

== Speculation surrounding Wittmann’s death ==
Photograph of the wrecked Tiger 007, taken by French civilian Serge Varin in 1945, still in the field near Gaumesnil where it had been stopped a year before.

After the war, there were a great many theories surrounding Wittmann's death. It was attributed to 1st Polish Armoured Division, the 4th Canadian Armoured Division, the 144th Regiment Royal Armoured Corps and the Second Tactical Air Force, Royal Air Force. The Germans theories included naval artillery as they did not believe Wittmann's Tiger could have been destroyed by another tank.

Wittmann's body was discovered in 1983 which prompted a new investigation into the circumstances of his death. In a 1985 issue of After the Battle, a popular military magazine, conducted an investigation. Les Taylor, a wartime member of the 1st Northamptonshire Yeomanry, claimed that Ekins was responsible for the destruction of Wittmann's tank. Veteran and historian Ken Tout, a member of the same unit, also published a similar account crediting Ekins. The battle was recorded in the Regimental War Diary entry for the 8th August, giving the Tiger tank turret numbers as 312, 007 and 314, tank 007 was Wittmann's. Historians have supported this position and it is the widely accepted version of events. According to Hart, Ekins's unit was positioned in a wood on the right flank of the advancing Tiger tanks. At approximately 12:47, they engaged them, halting the attack and killing Wittmann.

In preparation for his book, Brian Reid in 2005 postulates that A Squadron of the Sherbrooke Fusilier Regiment, 2nd Canadian Armoured Brigade, positioned on the left flank of the advancing German tanks, was responsible instead. Situated on the grounds of a château at Gaumesnil, the unit had created firing holes in the walls and engaged the advancing German tanks, including Tigers. The British tanks were between 800 and 1,200 meters away from the German line of advance, whereas the supposed Canadian squadron was around 500 m (550 yd) away. Reid offers no proof of his claim and it is not supported by the War Diary1st Northamptonshire Yeomanry, which does not mention the Canadians, though they overlooked the chateau Reid said they were positioned. A further discrepancy is that Reid mentions 5 Tigers in the field, and he disputes the position of 007 moving it from the center of the field to left nearer the chateau. The War Diary of the 1st Northamptonshire Yeomanry and several eye witnesses from the 1985 investigation, mention only three Tigers, 314, 007 and 312 which Joe Ekins destroyed.

He accepted the doctrines of Hitler enough to get in his tank and invade other peoples' countries. Country after country. To kill men, women and children. He might have been a hero to the Germans, but not to me.

== Later life ==
After the war, Ekins returned to Rushden, Northamptonshire and went back to work in the shoe factories near his home town. He retired 34 years later, after becoming a manager of one of the factories. He married and had two children.

== Sources ==
- Ellis, L. F.; et al. (2004) [1962]. Butler, J. R. M. (ed.). Victory in the West: The Battle of Normandy. History of the Second World War United Kingdom. Vol. I (pbk. repr. Naval & Military Press, Uckfield ed.). Uckfield, East Sussex: HMSO. ISBN 1-84574-058-0. OCLC 276814706.
- Hart, Stephen A. (2007). Sherman Firefly vs Tiger: Normandy 1944. Osprey. ISBN 978-1-84603-150-2.
- Lefèvre, Eric. "Les Panzers (Normandie 1944)" [Panzers in Normandy: Then and Now]. After the Battle (October 1983). Translated by Cooke, R. London: Battle of Britain International Limited. ISBN 0-900913-29-0. F008.
- Reid, Brian (2005). No Holding Back: Operation Totalize, Normandy, August 1944. Toronto: Robin Brass Studio. ISBN 1-896941-40-0.
- Schneider, Wolfgang (2005). Tigers in Combat. Vol. II. Mechanicsburg, PA: Stackpole Military History. ISBN 0-8117-3203-7.
- Tout, Ken (2002). A Fine Night for Tanks: The Road to Falaise. Stroud: Sutton. ISBN 0-7509-3189-2.
- Tout, Ken (2007). By Tank - D to VE Days (abr. Tank! (1985) Tanks, Advance! (1987) and To Hell with Tanks! (1992) ed.). London: Robert Hale. ISBN 978-0-7090-8148-7.
- Pallud, Jean-Paul (1985). "It Happened Here: Michael Wittmann's Last Battle". After the Battle (48). London: Battle of Britain International. OCLC 948016970.
