= Brian Reid (historian) =

Canadian military historian (1939–2023)

Brian Allan Reid
- Born: November 20, 1939; Fort Erie, Ontario
- Died: November 14, 2023 (aged 83); Kemptville ON
- Military career
- Allegiance: Canada
- Branch: Canadian Army
- Service years: 1957 - 1994
- Rank: Lieutenant-Colonel
- Other work: Historian

Brian A. Reid was born in Fort Erie, Ontario, lived in Ottawa, and was a Canadian soldier and military historian.

== Biography ==
Reid joined the Canadian Army in 1957 as a gunner and was commissioned as an officer in 1961. He served in regimental, staff and liaison appointments in Canada, Europe and the United States during his long career. His last appointment, as a Lieutenant-Colonel in 1994, was in the Joint Plans and Operations Staff at National Defence Headquarters in Ottawa.

Reid authored a number of works on Canadian military history. His book NO HOLDING BACK: Operation TOTALIZE, Normandy, August 1944 enjoyed critical praise. John Marteinson, former editor of Canadian Military Journal and teacher at the Royal Military College of Canada wrote: "This book should be in the library of every student of Canadian military history."

== Selected bibliography ==
- No Holding Back: Operation Totalize, Normandy, August 1944
- Named by the Enemy: A History of The Royal Winnipeg Rifles
- Our Little Army in the Field: The Canadians in South Africa
- Fighting For Canada: Seven Battles, 1758-1945 (chapters)
- More Fighting for Canada: Five Battles, 1760-1944 (chapters)
- RCHA - Right of the Line (co-author)
- Canada at War and Peace II: A Millennium of Military Heritage (contributor)
