= Saint-Aignan-de-Cramesnil =

- Part of Le Castelet
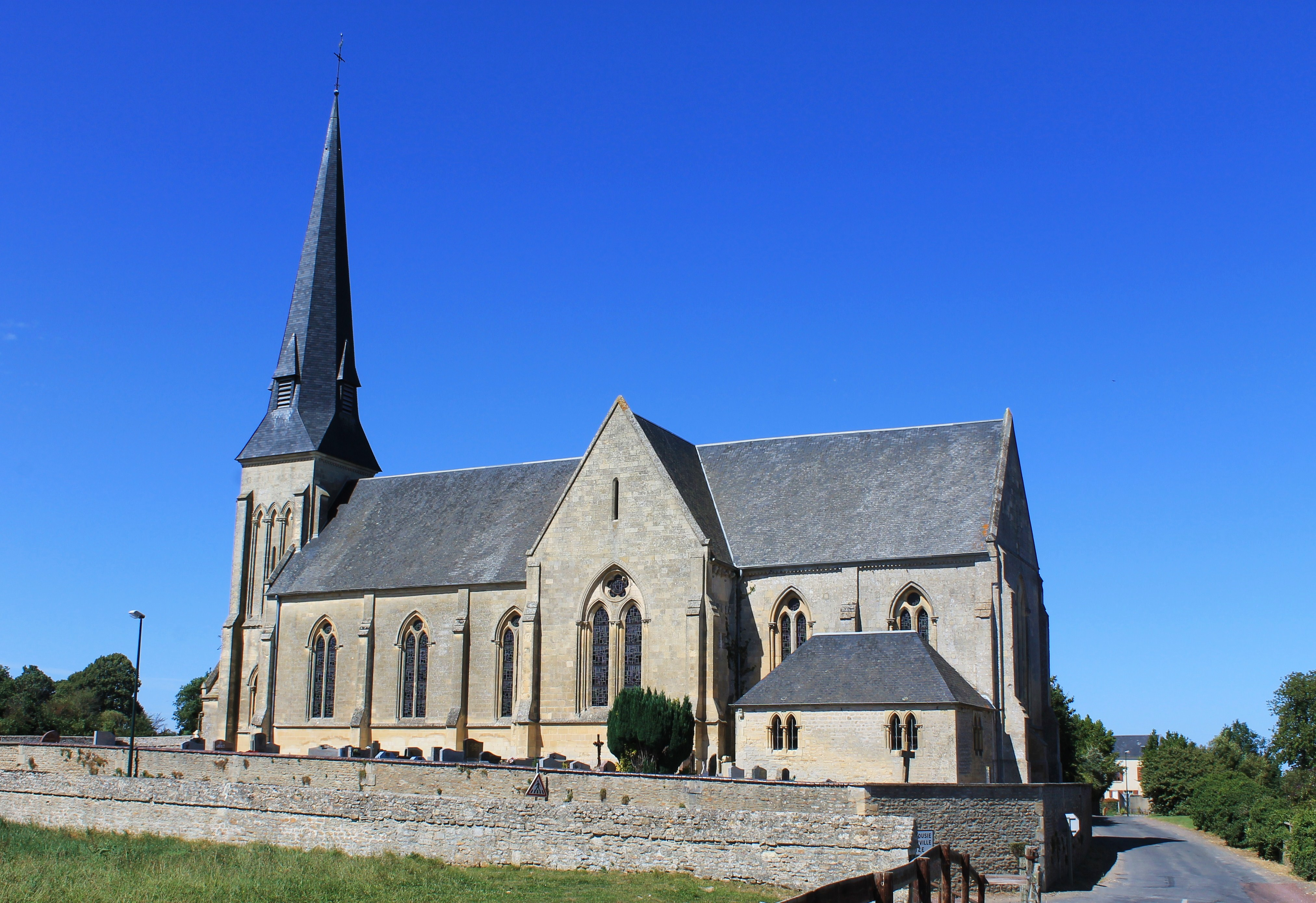
- The church in Saint-Aignan-de-Cramesnil
- Location of Saint-Aignan-de-Cramesnil
- Location within France Location within Normandy
- Coordinates: 49°04′54″N 0°16′43″W
- Country: France
- Region: Normandy
- Department: Calvados
- Arrondissement: Caen
- Canton: Évrecy
- Commune: Le Castelet
- Area^{1}: 6.91 km^{2} (2.67 sq mi)
- Elevation: 122 m (400 ft)
- Highest elevation: 119 m (390 ft)
- Lowest elevation: 63 m (207 ft)
- Population (2023): 722
  - Density: 104/km^{2} (271/sq mi)
- Time zone: UTC+01:00 (CET)
  - Summer (DST): UTC+02:00 (CEST)
- Postal code: 14540
- ^{1} French Land Register data, which excludes lakes, ponds, glaciers > 1 km^{2} (0.386 sq mi or 247 acres) and river estuaries.

Saint-Aignan-de-Cramesnil (French pronunciation: [sɛ̃t‿ɛɲɑ̃ də kʁamenil]) is a former commune in the Calvados department in the Normandy region in northwestern France, approximately 17 kilometres (11 mi) southeast of Caen. On 1 January 2019, it was merged into the new commune Le Castelet.

== Personalities ==
This village is known as the site of the death of the famous German tank commander Michael Wittmann on 8 August 1944, when his Tiger tank (number 007) was destroyed during an ambush. The crew of the destroyed tank was buried in an unmarked grave. In 1983, the German War Graves Commission located the burial site. Wittmann and his crew were reinterred together at the La Cambe German war cemetery, plot 47—row 3—grave 120, in France (about 70 km west).

== See also ==
- Communes of the Calvados department
