= Amabile =

Amabile may refer to:

- John Amabile (disambiguation)
- Sweetness of wine
- The Amabile Choirs of London, Canada, a family of choirs
- A musical direction
