= Andrew Balfour (disambiguation) =

Andrew Balfour (1873–1931) was a Scottish medical administrator and sportsman who played rugby union for Cambridge University.

Andrew Balfour may also refer to:

- Andrew Balfour of Montquhanie (died 1615), Scottish landowner
- Andrew Balfour (botanist) (1630–1694), Scottish doctor and botanist
- Andrew Balfour (architect) (1863–1943), Scottish architect
- Andrew Balfour (composer), Cree composer and conductor from Winnipeg, Manitoba
- Andrew Balfour (1741–1814), 16th of Whitehill, son of Robert Balfour, 4th of Balbirnie

== See also ==
- David Andrew Balfour (1906–1985), 4th Baron Kinross
