= Bomb (tank) =

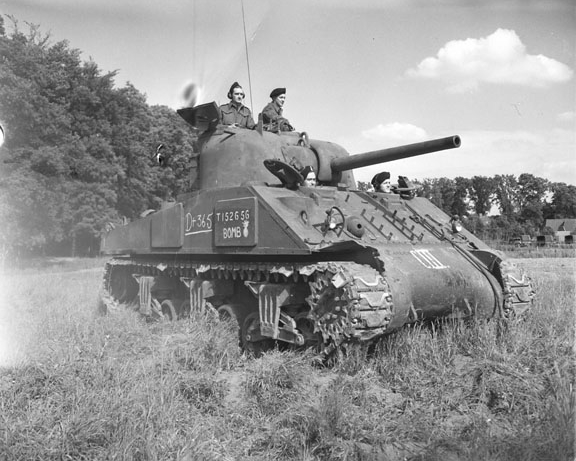
- Bomb a year after D-Day
- Type: M4 Sherman (M4A2 variant)
- Place of origin: United States

Service history
- In service: 1944–1945
- Used by: Canadian Army
- Wars: World War II (Western Europe)

Production history
- Designer: U.S. Army Ordnance Department
- Manufacturer: Fisher Tank Arsenal

Specifications
- Crew: 5 (commander, gunner, loader, driver, assistant driver/bow gunner)
- Main armament: 75 mm gun M3 (90–104 rounds)
- Engine: General Motors Twin G-41 Engine

Bomb is a preserved M4 Sherman tank. It was used by the Canadian Army 27th Armoured Regiment (The Sherbrooke Fusilier Regiment) which landed in France on 6 June and fought across northwest Europe until the end of World War II. It was one of the few Canadian tanks that fought without interruption from D-Day to VE Day.

Today Bomb is preserved at the William Street Armoury in Sherbrooke, Quebec.

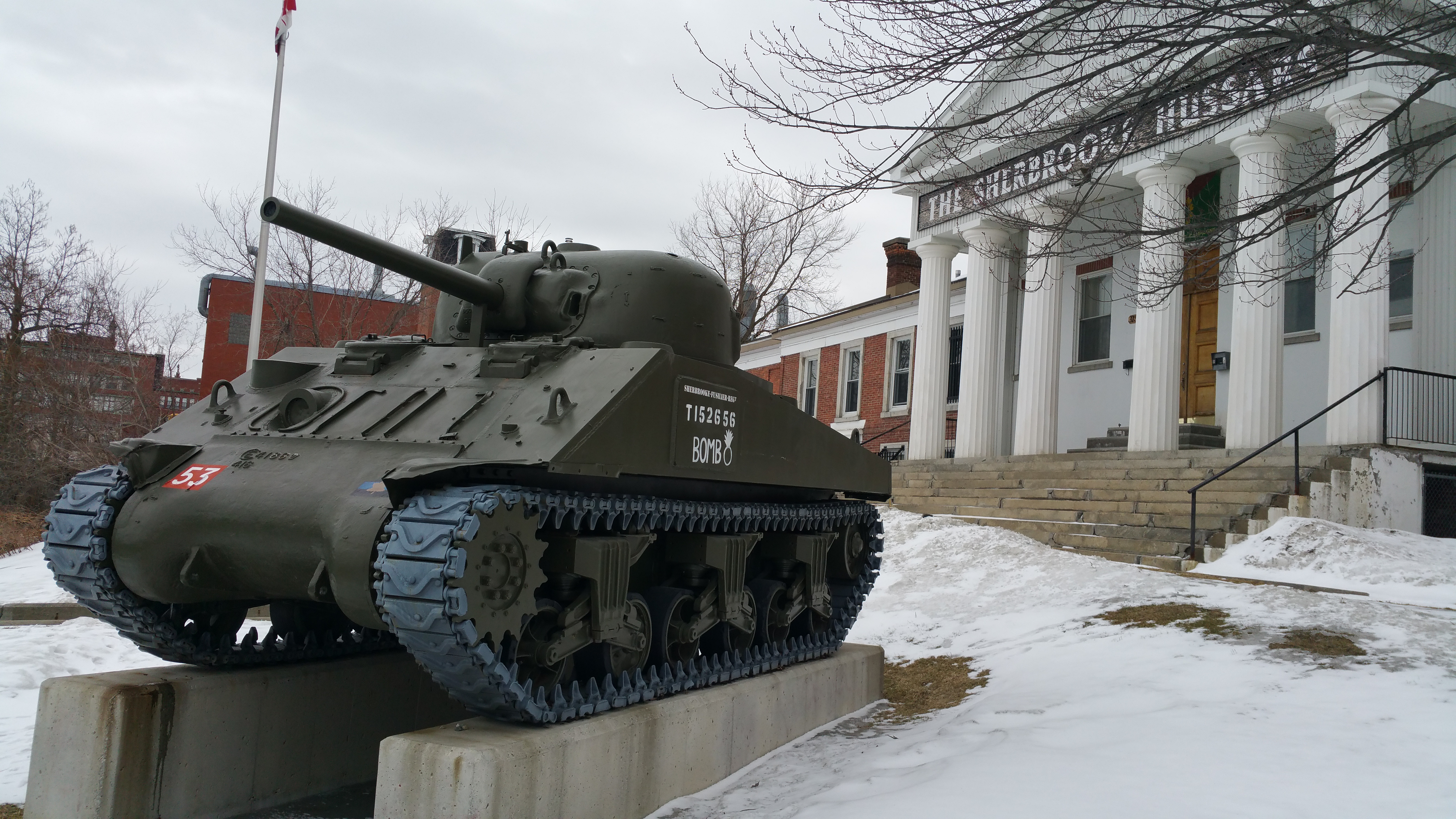
Bomb is preserved in Sherbrooke, Quebec. Pictured here in April 2015.

== Origins ==
Bomb was built at General Motors' Fisher Tank Arsenal in Flint, Michigan, United States, as an M4A2 Sherman tank, serial number 8007. It was shipped to England, where it was issued with the War Department number T-152656. The tank was assigned to B Squadron of the Sherbrooke Fusiliers as the regiment converted from older training tanks to new Shermans in preparation for the invasion of France as part of the 2nd Canadian Armoured Brigade. The tanks of B Squadron all had names that started with B such as Barbara and Be Good. The name Bomb was inspired by the Fusiliers' cap badge which features a stylized grenade.

== Crew members ==
The original crew was led by commander Sergeant Harold Futter. The driver was Lance-Corporal Rudy Moreault with co-driver Trooper "Red" Fletcher. The gunner was Trooper A.W. Rudolph and Trooper J.W. 'Tiny' Hall was the loader.

Futter was wounded in July 1944 and replaced by Lieutenant Paul W. Ayriss as commander until he in turn was wounded in September and replaced by Lieutenant John W. Neill MC. Neill was wounded in late February 1945 and his replacement was Lieutenant Walter M. White in March. White was wounded in April and Lieutenant Ernest Mingo became the commander and remained so for the duration of the war.

Fletcher was wounded in July. Hall was co-driver until July, when Ken Gerow, (Note: spelled Jeroux in Green Fields Beyond) became the co-driver and Hall became loader-[wireless] operator Rudolph was the gunner for the duration.

== Construction ==
It was made by Fisher Tank Division of General Motors, at the Grand Blanc Plant, Flint, Michigan. It was assigned hull Serial Number 8007, and a registration number believed to be 3063256. It was one of 432 tanks produced in November 1942, with serial numbers between 7769 and 8200. Bomb is one of over 4600 M4A2s made by Fisher in 25 months.

Provided under Lend-lease, Bomb received British War Department registration number T152656; as an M4A2 it was known under British designation as a Sherman III.

== Battle service ==
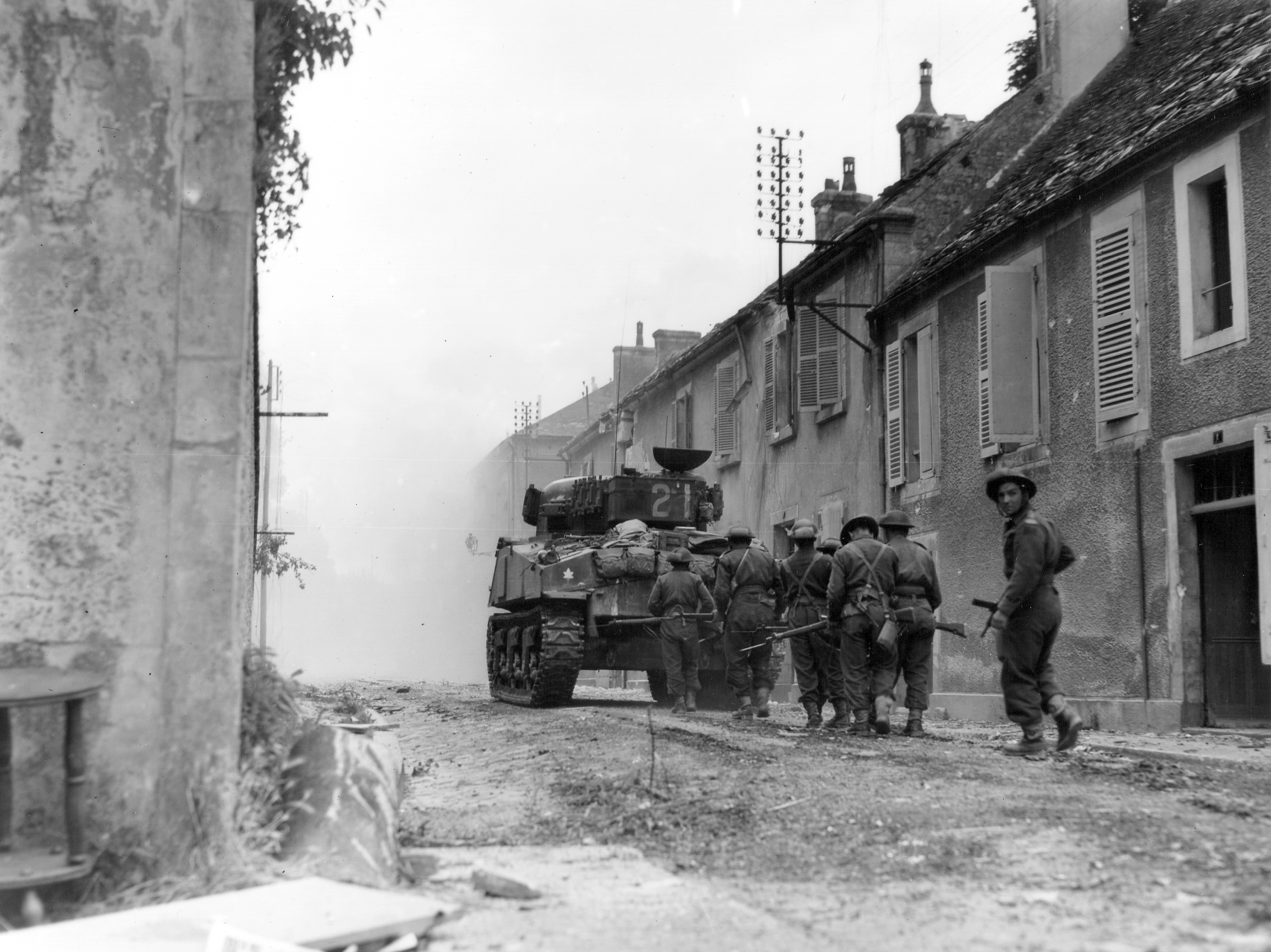
A Sherbrooke Fusilier Regiment tank, possibly Bomb, hunting snipers in Falaise, August 1944 with troops of the Fusiliers Mont-Royal

Bomb landed at Juno Beach on D-Day, June 6, 1944, with the Sherbrooke Fusilier Regiment (27th Canadian Armoured Regiment) at Bernières-sur-Mer. Bomb served continuously in B Squadron for 11 months and participated in every major operation of the regiment until VE-Day.

In the afternoon of D-Day, the SFR's three untested but thoroughly prepared tank squadrons and regimental headquarters arrived in France in a follow-up to the initial landings, and the tanks barely got wet. Falling short of their assigned objectives due to traffic congestion, road damage, and a cautious pace, the regiment formed a defensive harbour formation overnight to prepare for the next day. During that first night, a German anti-tank gun fired at Bomb but missed. One of the accompanying Sherman tanks, a mine-clearing Flail, fired back destroying the anti-tank gun.

On the morning of June 7, the SFR's advance resumed. The Germans held their fire and adjusted their defences to make contact with the SFR at Authie and Buron. In two days of intense combat, the Canadian tankers destroyed 41 enemy Panther and Panzer IV tanks. Two of those kills were Bomb's. B Squadron started the battle with 15 Shermans and emerged with five tanks fit for battle, including Bomb. The other two squadrons were just as badly mauled. The 2nd Canadian Armoured Brigade's two other regiments took over the line, allowing the Sherbrookes to pull back and recover. After 11 days in reserve, the three fighting squadrons were rebuilt with serviceable, recovered and replacement tanks. Replacement crews from the echelons took over from casualties. Sergeant Futter, who had commanded Bomb, was named Troop Sergeant of 2 Troop of B Squadron. The rest of June saw constant manoeuvring and probing, with frequent alerts always facing enemy fire.

By early July, the front had advanced to northwest of Caen. On 8 July an enemy shell hit the .50-cal anti-aircraft machine-gun on Bomb's turret. Sergeant Futter and loader-operator Fletcher were wounded inside the turret by the blast. Their replacements were crew member Trooper Gerow and crew commander Lieutenant Ayriss. With a new commander, Bomb became the 1 Troop Leader's tank. The original radio call sign on the rear of the turret was 22 (‘two-two’). When the troops were reorganized, Bomb was repainted with the call sign 21 (‘two-one’).

Later in July near to Bourguébus Ridge, in the Allies’ push south towards Falaise, a Panzer IV fired at and hit a spare road wheel mounted on Bomb's hull. Expecting a follow-up shot, the crew bailed out. When there was no second shot, they inspected the damage, and decided it was insignificant. The crews and their officers appreciated the value of external layers of track sections, road wheels and stowage boxes, even though rear echelon technical staff disapproved. Two more enemy tanks were knocked out by Bomb in the fighting for Verrières Ridge, bringing the count to four.

II Canadian Corps's concentrated and unrelenting operations had depleted the enemy's ability to defend along multiple axes of attack. Hoping to bowl the Germans backwards, phase one of Operation Tractable on the west side of the Liaze River, had infantry and attached SFR tank squadrons pressing towards the village of Clair Tizon south of Bretteville-sur-Laize. On 14 August, an RAF bomber mission was planned against German defences on a hill between the two villages. However, there was a miscalculation with identification smoke signals and some bombs landed amongst B Squadron's tanks. Bomb sustained unspecified damage. A 1945 newspaper story in the Sherbrooke Daily Record mentions a shell striking a drive sprocket. A week later, Bomb was repaired and rejoined the squadron for the attacks on Falaise.

In the closing weeks of August, as the Canadians, British and Polish divisions squeezed the Falaise Gap closed from the north against encircling American forces, the Germans fought just as hard to escape towards the east. On 17 August while Bomb was supporting the Fusiliers Mont-Royal in a disorganized close-range skirmish to clear a walled school compound, a German infantry anti-tank rocket hit a track link welded to Bomb's turret. Again, there was no significant damage.

Even while the Falaise Pocket was collapsing, the Britain and Canadian armoured divisions turned left to pursue German units retreating out of Normandy. From their position on the east end of the pocket, the SFR was ordered to move quickly towards the Seine River to secure strategic routes into northern France, Belgium and the Netherlands. Command staff had recognized that the hard-surface roads were undamaged and would be needed for main supply routes until other seaports could be liberated. Therefore, all steel-tracked combat vehicles had to stay off the roads. With limited maps, the regiment's reconnaissance troop of Stuart tanks looped back and forth to escort packets of tanks and other vehicles following along the edges of fields and down narrow trails. During this road move, Bomb suffered a burnt-out clutch and was late arriving in the staging area. In early September in the Forêt de la Londe near Elbeuf, understrength Canadian infantry brigades tangled disastrously with rearguard German units with heavy losses. Lieutenant Ayriss was reported injured in that fighting.

Bräun's regimental history records Lieutenant Neill taking command of Bomb in Falaise under fire on 17 August when Lieutenant Ayriss was to be promoted but also that as a Lieutenant (not Captain) Ayriss was still the crew commander in September. His name does not appear on the casualty lists for August or September

Lieutenant Neill replaced Lieutenant Ayriss and commanded Bomb through the fall and early winter of 1944–45. His determined actions in the breakout from Cleve earned him an immediate Military Cross. The citation said "In the breakout from Cleve in late February 1945, Lt Neill was leading a B Sqn troop of four tanks and a column of Kangaroo APCs. With darkness, smoke, mud, artillery and mortar fire, vehicle and personnel casualties, lagging infantry, and just about everything against him, Neill dashed forward with another tank to secure the objective and hold it for the trailing APCs to catch up and fully ‘consolidate without appreciable loss’."

During autumn 1944, the regiment was shared out to several British infantry divisions, the Irish Guards division, and the American 82nd Airborne Division, as well as Canadian formations. As in Normandy, the squadrons and troops were attached and detached as required to infantry battalions for fire support. The terrain was not advantageous for tank operations, and the squadrons suffered during the prolonged attrition. For their determination and contribution to the battle, the SFR was awarded the battle honours "Antwerp–Turnhout Canal" and "The Scheldt".

As winter set in the regiment had periods of idleness due to bad weather, lack of replacement crews and tanks, and supply shortages. Bomb received new engines on one occasion, and a new set of tracks on another.

Lieutenant Neill's replacement was Lieutenant Walter White of West Gore, Nova Scotia, who took command of the tank and for a short period led B Squadron of the Sherbrookes from Bomb. Lieutenant White was already an experienced armoured soldier in another regiment, having risen to sergeant major before taking his commission and attending Sandhurst Military College. Postwar White recalled the names of the other troop tanks as, Barbara, Be Good, and Bohunk. After fighting in the Hochwald Forest in Germany, White claimed to have led a reconnaissance to the banks of the Rhine River. Bomb's fifth and last confirmed tank kill was in Deventer in April 1945. Six weeks after assuming command, Lieutenant White was wounded while dismounted during the offensive to capture the Pimple on Calcar Ridge, near Deventer.

After Lieutenant White was evacuated, Lieutenant Ernest Mingo, from Tatamagouche, Nova Scotia, joined and remained as crew commander until the war's end. The regiment's tanks cleared enemy units along the IJsselmeer, through the northern Netherlands and into Germany. Mingo's postwar accounts of the final days described wasteful enemy counterattacks that left the fields in front of the Fusiliers’ positions covered with German dead. Finally, in the border town of Emden, Lieutenant Mingo received news from the tank's radio, "Unload, clear guns, the war is over."

By VE Day, the tank had fired 6,000 rounds in battle, had five enemy tank kills, used two engines and two set of tracks and taken two direct hits from enemy shells and been hit by an infantry anti-tank rocket, yet never missed a day of action. The tank and crew members Rudolph, Moreault and Hall were the subject of a Canadian Army Film and Photo Unit short documentary made in 1945 entitled The Green Fields Beyond (number 2090) in 1945.

== Amphibious conversion claim ==
Several years after the war, on-line reminisces of crew member Lt White suggested four tanks including Bomb were floated across the Rhine in March 1945. He claimed three landed together and Bomb landed slightly further downstream. The appearance of tanks supposedly surprised and overwhelmed the Germans. This story is implausible because there is no mention of such an audacious raid in the regimental history published postwar, contemporary War Diaries, period documents including Corps level orders, and thoroughly researched secondary sources.

== Description ==
From the factory, serial number 8007 was equipped with a General Motors (GM) 6046 twin inline-six diesel engine. That engine was removed when Bomb returned to Canada. This was one of four standardized powerplants, which included the original Continental 9-cylinder R975 radial aircraft engine, the Ford GAA gasoline V8, and a 30-cylinder Chrysler multibank of five engine blocks on one crankcase. Each was an interesting engineering answer to the constantly increasing demand for tank engines. The GM 6046 consisted of two off-the-shelf GM 6-71 diesel truck engines connected with a transfer case to a single drive shaft. Unlike other models of Sherman which have doors on the rear hull, this engine was serviced from the top through large doors on the engine deck. With the exception of 490 M4A2 diesels issued to the US Marines, all diesel Shermans were shipped to Britain, Free French forces or the Soviet Union as Lend-Lease. The explanation was simple: the US military had standardized on gasoline as a fuel and did not want vehicles with non-standard fuel. The main tank fuel capacity of the M4A2 148 US gallons (560 L; 123 imp gal). Those tanks are located on the left and right rear hull sponsons, above the tracks. As Bomb sits on display, the latest restoration removed all fuel, grease and oil in its tanks and components.

=== Hull details ===
On the continuum of M4A2 tanks, Bomb is considered late production and has small grille engine deck plates. It has the Fisher-fabricated-style bullet splash guard at front of the engine deck doors under the rear lip of the turret. The exhaust stacks are across the rear of the hull below the line of the upper armour. The rear upper hull is sloped, and has the Fisher simplified six-bolt rear engine deck plates configuration. There are welding scars where various fittings like the taillights and fuel can holders were removed over time. In the extreme left and right upper corners of the rear sponsons are two small storage compartments intended for extra track grousers. Their cover doors have been welded shut.

Moving forward, the Quick-Fix appliqué armour plates on the sidewalls indicate dry-stowage ammunition racks inside. The front glacis plate is the early 57° angle. The driver and co-driver have small hatches, and the characteristic cast "narrow" driver's hood with direct vision slots but no additional Quick-Fix driver's hood additional front armour. Review of photos indicates the equilibrator springs on front hatches are missing. However, there are remnants of the fixtures for the "driver's hatch hood and windshield." The bow M1919A4 machine gun canvas dustcover's slot-style fitting is still present, although the ball mount itself has been removed and the opening plated over for display. The base for the high control radio antenna is present, and likewise blanked over. It has a one-piece rounded nose drawing E 4186 differential housing with the characteristic mid-production shot-defection lip for the bolt heads. Missing from the front glacis are the headlights and guards, and siren. However, there are welding scars and remnant bars on the front glacis, which correspond to where extra track sections were attached in Normandy to defeat German tank and anti-tank guns projectiles. The lifting eyes are the padded style, and the tow hooks themselves are missing.

The running gear is US-made Sherman not Canadian-made Vertical Volute Spring System (VVSS), with rear offset return rollers. It appears to have its original M4 bogies, which are the early configuration of swing arms without adjustment wrench holes. These are the early return roller assembly with horizontal return roller brackets, and mid production or asymmetric return skids. A keen eye will spot that the return rollers were never retrofitted with the 1-inch (25 mm) spacer risers. There is a mix of welded spoke and pressed spoke roadwheels, which suggest field repairs where the originals were damaged. However, for a wartime survivor, the rubber is in very good condition, which suggests postwar replacement versus wartime repairs. The rear idler wheels are welded six-spoke style. The right-side sprocket is a cast style with dimples. The left-side sprocket is a plate steel WW2 simplified pattern. There is no way to tell if either or none are original, but the sprocket notches wear out as the track mileage increases. There is a mixture of track types, including ‘T62 Steel, rolled sections chevron grouser riveted’ with the characteristic rounded rivet heads, and ‘T54E1 Steel, fabricated, chevron grouser’ with the characteristic central tab on the long edge. The end connectors are various types, many showing signs of broken grousers.

=== Turret and armament ===
The turret is drawing number D 50878, serial number 303, cast by Continental-Wheeling, the heat treatment lot not visible, and several original tie-down loops are present. The 75 mm gun is mounted on an early-pattern rotator M34 gun mount. Bomb does not have the later M34A1 with characteristic ears on the sides of the barrel. The gun-mount bolts are exposed, not protected behind the outer edges of mount. It is the so-called low turret bustle. There is a pistol port and door on the left side of turret. The crew commander's hatch has the low-profile split hatch cupola. The external fittings on the hatch are missing, including any hatch lock mechanisms. The .50-calibre Browning anti-aircraft mount is damaged. This model turret did not have a loader's hatch. The gunner's vane sight is present, but no spot light base or periscope sight remain.

== Preservation ==
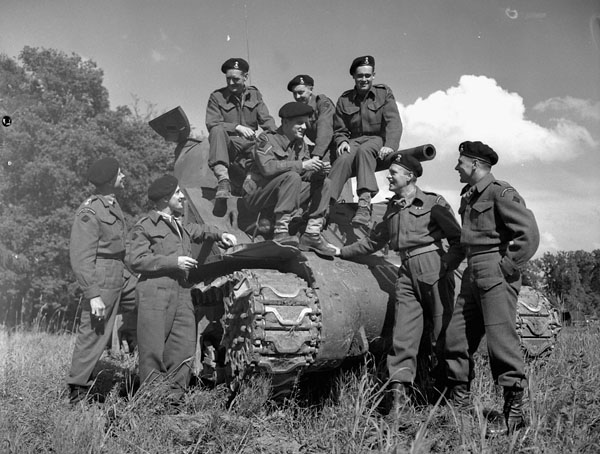
Bomb with its crew 8 June 1945 in Zutphen, Netherlands. Standing are the four tank commanders who served with Bomb

Bomb was one of two Canadian tanks to fight without interruption from D-Day to VE Day. The other survivor is Holy Roller with the 1st Hussars, and it is preserved in London, Ontario. Bomb was rescued from a Belgian scrapyard to be shipped to Canada. It was one of four Canadian tanks shipped from service in Northwestern Europe to preservation in Canada, along with Forceful III in Ottawa and Holy Roller in London, Ontario.

The tank was on display at the Champs de Mars Park in Sherbrooke, Quebec, and later moved to the front lawns of the William Street Armoury. The armoury was the base of the Sherbrooke Regiment, one of the two militia units that had mobilized the 27th Armoured Regiment. After the Sherbrooke Regiment and the 7th/11th Hussars amalgamated in 1964, the tank has been looked after by its successor unit, the Sherbrooke Hussars.

Holy Roller was War Department CT 152655 number which immediately preceded Bomb. She landed on D-Day with Regimental Headquarters Squadron, 6th Armoured Regiment (1st Hussars), and served with from D-Day to VE Day as well. Holy Roller was a commander's tank, and although effective leaders led from the front, Holy Roller does not have the same combat record as Bomb.

Forceful III landed in Normandy six weeks after D-Day with the 21st Armoured Regiment (The Governor General's Foot Guards). Her battle service was admirable and reputation well-earned. For many years Forceful III stood outside Cartier Square Drill Hall, before being moved indoors at the Canadian War Museum.

For many years, Ernest Mingo, the tank's last commander, would make an annual visit to Sherbrooke from his home in Nova Scotia to visit Bomb and comrades from the Fusiliers, while Dutch families, grateful for the tank's role in liberating the Netherlands, sent an annual gift of tulip bulbs to Mingo and Walter White at his home in West Gore, Nova Scotia. The tank was restored in 2011, receiving plaques to reflect its battle service and a paint scheme that reflected its wartime appearance.
