= Andrew Balfour (composer) =

- Born: 1967; Fisher River Cree Nation
- Occupation: composer

Andrew Balfour is a Cree composer and conductor from Winnipeg, Manitoba. He is the artistic director of the vocal ensemble Dead of Winter.

Balfour was nominated for the 2023 Juno Award for Classical Album of the Year (Small Ensemble) for Nagamo, recorded with Musica Intima vocal ensemble.

== Early life ==
Balfour was born in the Fisher River Cree Nation, located north of Winnipeg, in 1967. He was taken from his birth mother at six months old as part of the Sixties Scoop and adopted by a White settler family of Scottish descent. Balfour's adoptive father was a minister at All Saints’ Anglican Church in Winnipeg and his mother was a violinist. His adoptive family would encourage his interest in music which developed through choral singing and playing trumpet and trombone.

Balfour would go on to attend Brandon University, later dropping out. During this period he would develop a dependence on alcohol. Balfour was arrested in 1992 for vandalism and was then placed in Milner Ridge Correctional Centre. Following his time in prison, he would begin singing in an informal choir with a group of singers which would later become Camerata Nova (now Dead of Winter), of which Balfour is artistic director.

== Career ==
Balfour founded vocal ensemble Dead of Winter (formerly Camerata Nova) in 1996 following his time in prison. The founding of the ensemble would also mark the beginning of his composition career. He has since been commissioned by the Toronto Symphony Orchestra, Vancouver Chamber Choir, Tafelmusik Baroque Orchestra, and the Toronto Mendelssohn Choir.

In March of 2025 Balfour was scheduled to perform at Carnegie Hall with the Amabile Choirs of London, Canada. However, Balfour was detained upon entry into the United States at Newark Liberty International Airport. He was later sent back to Toronto, having never been granted entry into the United States.

== Selected Compositions ==
- Take the Indian - 2014, chamber choir
- Empire Étrange: The Death of Louis Riel - 2013, oratorio
- Notinikew: Going to War - 2018, chamber choir
- Mamachimowin (The act of singing praises) - 2019, commissioned by the Toronto Mendelssohn Choir
- Nagamo - 2022, chamber choir
