= Battle of Le Mesnil-Patry =

Battle in France during the Second World War

Coordinates: 49°11′45″N 0°32′37″W

- Part of the Battle for Caen
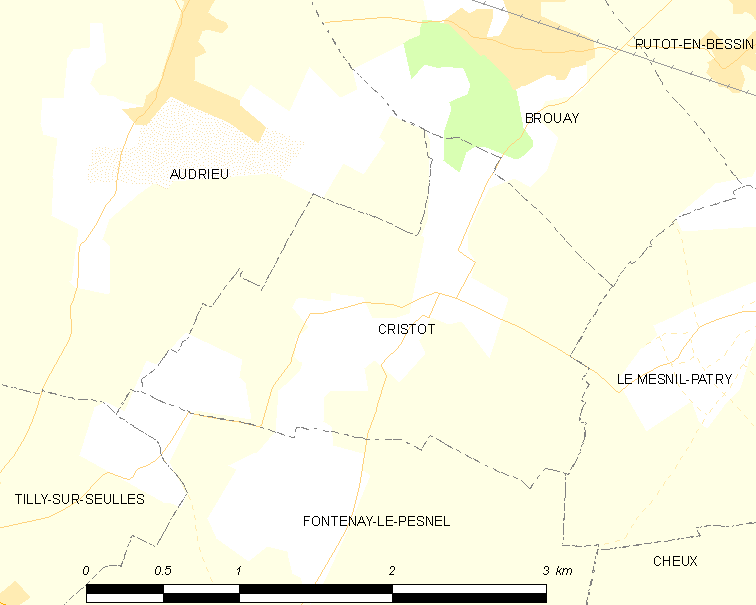
- Map of Le Mesnil-Patry and Cristot
Date	11 June 1944
Location	Le Mesnil-Patry, France
Result	German victory

Belligerents
Canada	Germany

Strength
The Queen's Own Rifles of Canada; 1st Hussars	12th SS Panzer Division Hitlerjugend

Casualties and losses
116 killed/missing; 35 wounded; 22 captured; 51 tanks	189 killed/missing; 3 Panzer IV
- Le Mesnil-Patry, a former commune in the Calvados department of Normandy

The Battle of Le Mesnil-Patry during the Second World War was the last attack by a Canadian armoured battle group in Normandy in June 1944. The Queen's Own Rifles of Canada of the 8th Canadian Infantry Brigade of the 3rd Canadian Division, supported by the 6th Armoured Regiment (1st Hussars) of the 2nd Canadian Armoured Brigade attacked the village of Le Mesnil-Patry to advance southwards towards the higher ground of Hill 107 west of Cheux. The attack was intended to support a larger operation by the 50th (Northumbrian) Infantry Division and the 7th Armoured Division to capture the city of Caen and to advance in the centre of the bridgehead next to the First US Army. The battle was a German defensive success but the greater German objective of defeating the invasion by a counter-offensive also failed.

Both sides changed tactics after the first week of the invasion, the Germans constructed a defence-in-depth, with tank forces reserved for limited counter-attacks, intended to slow the Allied advance inland and avoid casualties and losses of equipment until reinforcements arrived. The Allies began to accumulate supplies to conduct attrition attacks, rather than persist with mobile operations by large numbers of tanks supported by infantry. More atrocities by troops of the 12th SS Panzer Division Hitlerjugend against Canadian prisoners occurred and orders given by a junior Canadian commander to refrain from taking German prisoners as a reprisal, were countermanded by higher authority as soon as they were discovered. Canadian offensive operations in the 3rd Canadian Infantry Division area ceased, apart from raiding and reconnaissance patrols, until VIII Corps commenced Operation Epsom on 26 June.

== Background ==
=== Invasion of Normandy ===
On 6 June 1944, Allied forces invaded France in Operation Neptune, the landings of Operation Overlord. A force of several thousand ships transported assault forces to the beaches in Normandy, supported by c. 3,000 aircraft. The D-Day landings succeeded but the Allies were unable to capture Caen as planned. The US 101st Airborne Division, 82nd Airborne Division and the British 6th Airborne Division with an attached Canadian airborne battalion, dropped behind the German coastal defences. The British and Canadian paratroops behind Sword Beach were to capture bridges over the Orne River such as Horsa and Pegasus Bridge and silence the Merville Gun Battery to hinder German counter-attacks. The Allies established a bridgehead north of Caen on the east bank of the Orne, which protected the beachhead, forced the Germans to oppose it with scarce tank units needed elsewhere and provided a jumping-off position for later attacks towards Caen.

== Prelude ==
=== Plan ===
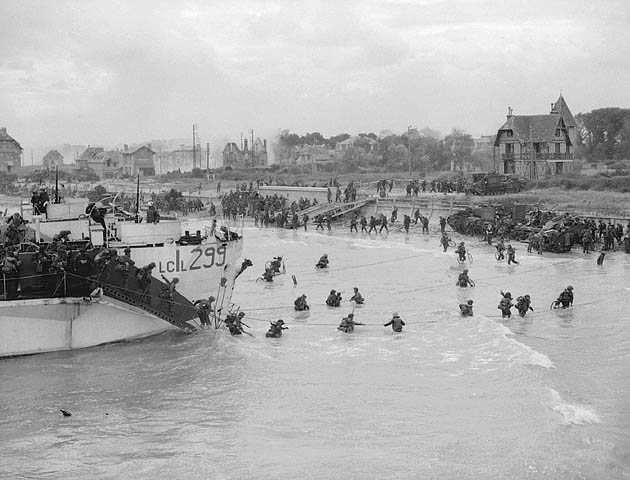
Canadian reserve troops disembark at 'Nan White' Beach at Bernières-sur-Mer.

On 9 June, The Queen's Own Rifles of Canada had come under the command of the 7th Brigade and moved to occupy Bray. On 10 June, plans were laid for an attack to fill a gap between the 7th and 9th Brigades, in the valley of the Mue River between Cairon and Rots. Planning began for an advance by the 2nd Canadian Armoured Brigade south of Norrey-en-Bessin to occupy high ground beyond Cheux, south of Norrey-en-Bessin, with the clearing of the Mue valley as a preliminary, in support of the main attack due on 12 June. Early on 11 June, the preliminary attack was cancelled by General Miles Dempsey, the commander of the Second Army and combined with the main attack, forming the left pincer of another attempt to capture high ground south of Cristot. The 69th Infantry Brigade of the 50th (Northumbrian) Division, attacked further west near Bronay, 1 mi (1.6 km) north-east of Le Mesnil-Patry. An attack by the 7th Armoured Division through Tilly-sur-Seulles on Villers-Bocage and Évrecy, required that all German units further east be engaged to prevent them moving westwards.

If the attack succeeded, II Battalion, SS-Panzergrenadier Regiment 26 (Obersturmbannführer Wilhelm Mohnke) would be cut off and destroyed, leaving a gap in the positions of the 12th SS-Panzer Division, exposing Carpiquet, the rear of Caen and the confluence of the Odon and Orne rivers. The 2nd Canadian Armoured Brigade issued orders in the morning of 10 June to the 10th Armoured Regiment (The Fort Garry Horse). At 7:30 a.m. on 11 June, the attack toward Cheux was ordered to begin as soon as possible that day. The commander of the 1st Hussars had no time to conduct a reconnaissance with the R Group (a reconnaissance group composed of attached arms, an artillery representative and the squadron leaders) and then complete an appreciation of the situation before issuing orders; the squadron commanders would have then issued detailed orders to the troop leaders. The 6th Canadian Armoured Regiment (CAR) tried to get ready, "In the morning we were told we were moving at 11:00 a.m. Sunday 11 June. I knew one tank would he left behind, but was told later that only eighteen took part in the shoot. There was no briefing". Some of the 1st Hussar troops thought it would be a quiet HE shoot with the artillery.

The operation was to begin at the front positions of 7th Canadian Brigade, where a company of the Regina Rifles was astride the railway and in Norrey. The 6th Armoured Regiment (1st Hussars) and The Queen's Own Rifles of Canada were to pass through Norrey and then advance 2 mi (3.2 km) south, to capture high ground near Cheux, with B Squadron attacking first, followed by C Squadron which was to move to the high ground on the right flank, ready to give covering fire and then the Headquarters Squadron, A Squadron behind B Squadron. The infantry were to ride on the tanks and in the first phase, reach Le Mesnil-Patry by 1:00 p.m., then make a right flanking movement through the village to bypass Cheux; the rest of the armoured brigade would then to join the 6th Armoured Regiment on the objective at Hill 107. The commanders of the first phase asked for more time to prepare but were refused, because of the importance of the attacks by the 7th Armoured and 50th (Northumbrian) divisions.

A Canadian success could force the Germans out of Cristot and ease the advance of the 50th (Northumbrian) Division. The plan depended on the quick seizure of Le Mesnil-Patry, which would enable the north-west part of the 12th SS-Panzer Division defence perimeter to be cut off by a supporting attack by the 69th Infantry Brigade from north-east of Le Mesnil-Patry. Much of SS-Panzergrenadier Regiment 26 would be destroyed. An opportunity would be created to advance to the Odon or turn east toward Carpiquet and envelop the rest of the 12th SS-Panzer Division. When the 1st Hussars were established at Le Mesnil-Patry, the 10th and 27th CAR could attack southwards to the high ground and make Caen untenable.

== Battle ==
=== Le Mesnil-Patry ===
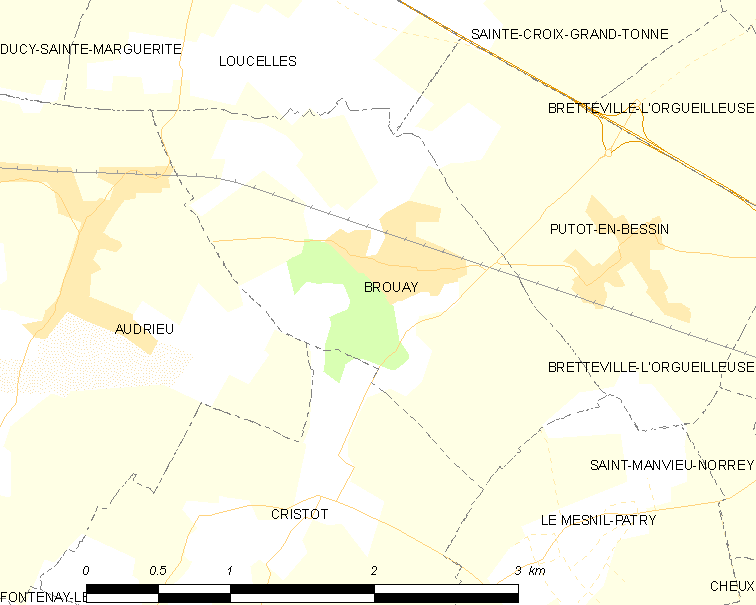
Map showing area of the Canadian and British attacks at Le Mesnil-Patry and Cristot, 11 June (commune FR insee code 14109)

The 6th CAR had recently received twenty replacement tanks and crews, who had not had time to settle in and few of the men had much idea of the plan. The 6th CAR advanced south across the highway and railway, with B Squadron forward, carrying D Company of the Queen's Own Rifles (QOR) on the backs of the tanks. South of the railway was a knocked out Panther,

A couple of nervous troops immediately deployed upon sighting it and several tanks engaged the hulk with direct fire. The road was narrow with high abutments. The Regiment continued in single file and reached Norrey at 2:30 p.m.,...as our leading squadron was starting off they found that the Regiment would have to pass through Norrey-en-Bessin [Norrey] in line ahead formation. Our infantry had sown mines on both sides of the road Bretteville–Norrey, and they had not been lifted; there was no time to wait for them to accomplish this. We changed our start line as soon as this intelligence was received and B Squadron went on its way followed by C and A squadrons and Regimental Headquarters (RHQ) close to the rear.

The Canadian column reached Norrey-en-Bessin at 2:00 p.m., to find that the Canadian troops there had not been informed of the attack and that the proposed forming up place was in a minefield. The flat grain fields towards Le Mesnil-Patry had not been occupied and there had been no sign of a German withdrawal. The advance through the fields between Norrey and Le Mesnil-Patry was intended to begin at the same time as the attack further west against Cristot but this was delayed. The village was dominated by a church in the centre and the Pioneer Platoon from II Battalion, SS-Panzer Grenadier Regiment 26 was inside the village. The Canadian advance had been reported and as the vanguard reached the village centre, German artillery and mortar fire began while the QOR, on the backs of the tanks, were exposed. The tanks increased speed but in the village centre was a crossroad, where the road to Le Mesnil took a sharp right turn. At 3:06 p.m., the regiment reported that the advance had been held up by fire from unseen positions.

SS-Panzergrenadier Regiment 26 and a company of tanks from the 12th SS-Panzer Division ambushed the tanks of B Squadron in the grain fields near Le Mesnil-Patry, assisted by intelligence gleaned from Hussar radio traffic, after capturing wireless codes from a knocked out Canadian tank on 9 June. The Germans had been instructed to

...let the tanks roll by and only fight the infantry following behind with rifles and machine guns... since the enemy infantry did not follow the tanks but was [were] mounted on them, the men opened fire immediately. The Canadian infantry jumped off. The tanks rolled, their machine guns firing wildly in all directions, at high speed towards Le Mesnil. Bloody hand-to-hand combat between the Pioneers and the Canadian Infantry broke out.

The Shermans were easy targets in the narrow streets and drove for open country, while the QOR were left to fight the German infantry. The battle group had been dispersed and would have no secure base, until D Company consolidated the village. About a platoon of D Company followed the tanks on foot and advanced about 300 yd (270 m); the tanks mopped up some machine-gun nests and infantry positions. The tanks of B Squadron pushed on, scattering German infantry in their path. Some B Squadron tanks and infantry reached a small rise on the edge of the village, where the tanks were engaged by concealed anti-tank guns on the left flank near St Mauvieu, which quickly knocked out six tanks. C Squadron moved to the right to give covering fire but was mistakenly engaged by British anti-tank gunners of the 50th (Northumbrian) Division. A Squadron and the RHQ advanced through Norrey, to the start line just to the west and C Squadron retired, flying recognition signals and having to pick its way round the Canadian minefields and the ruins of Norrey, where German artillery-fire had collapsed the church into the road.

As B Squadron and D Company advanced from Norrey, C Squadron and troops of the QOR also advanced and were engaged from the north-west, from Le Mesnil-Patry and from the south-east,

Suddenly both B and C Squadrons reported a/tank guns and tanks firing on them. This information was passed to our Brigade who in turn ordered our men not to fire on them as they were friendly tanks. The CO ordered Major A. d'A. Marks [of] C Squadron to hold his fire and fly his recognition flags. Major A. d'A. Marks acted upon this and even got out of his tank to ensure that all the tanks were flying their flags.

the Canadians had broken through the boundary of III Battalion, SS-Panzergrenadier Regiment 26 and I Battalion, SS-Panzergrenadier Regiment 26. Both were supported by 7.5 cm Pak 40 anti-tank guns and Panzer IVs of the 2nd SS-Panzer Battalion. Mohnke was well forward and requested tank support. D Company troops kept to the ground and crawled forward to the outskirts of Le Mesnil-Patry. A party of seven riflemen and two tanks worked to a flank and entered the east end of the village.

Three German tanks attacked from the right flank and knocked out several Canadian tanks, which had taken post in an orchard. The German and Canadian infantry took cover from crossfire as tanks on both sides were knocked out. The commander of the first Sherman saw that the German troops and tanks in the area were formed up for attack. Three half-tracks were seen parked together near infantry, who began running around in confusion and then about thirty more tanks also parked together were seen, then a battery of 88 mm guns and more half-tracks. Three of the half-tracks were destroyed by the Sherman, which then caught fire. The crew reversed for 600 yd (550 m), with clothes and ammunition burning on the outside of the tank as Panzergrenadiers threw grenades and the crew fired back, before bailing out and retiring along a ditch.

SS-Panzer Company 8 was deployed in an ambush position about 0.62 mi (1 km) south of Le Mesnil-Patry and when "mushrooms of smoke, generated by knocked out tanks" were seen, the company counter-attacked and quickly knocked out several Shermans. The tanks pushed through the woods and saw the 6th CAR, where B Squadron was advancing towards Le Mesnil-Patry and C Squadron was moving up to support. Three Panzer IVs moved to engage the Canadian tanks as the rest of the company engaged the Hussars from the Le Mesnil area. The flanking manoeuvre brought the German tanks round the exposed left rear of B Squadron and onto the flank of C Squadron. Major E. Dalton, commander of the most advanced section of the Queen's Own Rifles, was wounded in the leg by mortar fire and Lieutenant-Colonel Colwell, the commander of the Hussars, forward with the most advanced tanks, realizing that the regiment was outflanked by the German tanks, ordered a retreat to the start line to reform. B Squadron was trapped in the village and almost destroyed by Panzerfaust, Panzerschreck and anti-tank gun fire. The Germans knocked out from 37 to 51 Sherman tanks, only two of which returned.

The attack into the Mue valley was spearheaded by No. 46 (Royal Marine) Commando, under the command of the 8th Canadian Infantry Brigade, with support from a squadron of the 10th Canadian Armoured Regiment. The Régiment de la Chaudière (Chaudières) and the North Shores were to move into the valley and consolidate villages as they were captured. The Commandos attacked down the valley from Thaon and captured Cairon, Lasson and Rosel; in the evening the force entered Le Hamel and Rots. Troops of SS-Panzergrenadier Regiment 12 and Panther tanks hidden in Rots held their ground; tanks of the Fort Garry Horse and infantry of the Chaudières were sent forward as reinforcements but German resistance was not overcome until the early hours of 12 June. In the evening, artillery-fire diminished, several ambulances drove out from the Canadian lines and the Germans ceased fire while wounded were collected by both sides; the Canadians claimed 14 Panthers destroyed. During the night, The Fort Garry Horse and the infantry of the Chaudières concentrated between Bray and Rots, about 3 mi (4.8 km) behind the front line, ready to forestall an attempt by the Germans to exploit the confusion and attack northwards towards the coast.

=== Cristot ===
The 69th Infantry Brigade attack on Cristot was arranged quickly, with very little known about the ground, beyond what the commander of the 8th Armoured Brigade had learned during the morning. Only scattered German infantry were said to be in the area but it was suspected that the Germans were under cover, waiting for the main attack before revealing themselves. The brigade planned an attack by the 6th and 7th Green Howards, after which the 5th East Yorks were to move on Point 103, supported by the 4/7th Royal Dragoon Guards, the 147th Field Regiment and two batteries of the 90th Field Regiment but a detailed fire plan could not be arranged at such short notice. The attack began from Audrieu to the north-west, to guard the left flank of the 8th Armoured Brigade and the 8th Durham Light Infantry (DLI) in St. Pierre. The 5th East Yorks would then relieve the 1st Dorsets on the high ground of Point 103, to keep the eastern (left) flank of the 50th (Northumbrian) Division level with the 3rd Canadian Infantry Division and would then capture the high ground at Point 102, south of Cristot.

The attack began at 2:30 p.m. with the 6th Green Howards and the tanks of the 4/7th Dragoons but the SS-Panzeraufklärungsabteilung 12 (12th SS-Reconnaissance Battalion) had arrived around Cristot earlier in the day. At about 5:00 p.m., during the advance through dense bocage towards Cristot, the tanks and the infantry became separated. The Germans let the unescorted British tanks pass by and then quickly knocked out seven of the nine tanks from the rear; by 6:00 p.m., the 6th Green Howards advance had also been stopped outside Cristot. The reserve company was sent forward and began to force back the German defenders but parties of German infantry got behind the Green Howards, who by 8:30 p.m., had advanced close to Point 102, despite many casualties. German tanks attacked across the Green Howards axis of advance, who were then ordered to retire westwards, to the high ground of Point 103 to avoid encirclement.

== Aftermath ==
=== Analysis ===
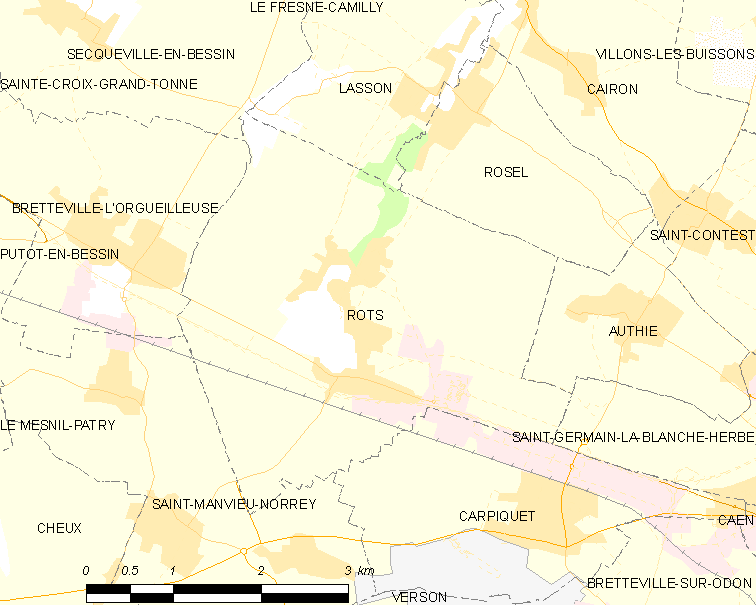
Map of Rots area (commune FR insee code 14543)

The attack on Le Mesnil-Patry had been disastrous for the Canadian attackers and the broader Allied advance on Caen was defeated. An English newspaper called it the modern equivalent of the Charge of the Light Brigade. The 7th Green Howards advance from the west also failed, as the battalion was stopped by machine-gun fire along the Bayeux–Caen railway embankment near Brouay. The 5th East Yorks were caught in the open when moving to relieve the 1st Dorsets, during the preparatory artillery bombardment for a German counter-attack on Point 103 and suffered many casualties. The 6th Green Howards may have disrupted the German infantry forming for the attack on Point 103 but the German tanks overran the 5th East Yorks. Having also become separated from their infantry, the German tanks were repulsed at the firm base held by the 1st Dorsets and part of the 8th Armoured Brigade at 10:30 p.m.

The attack on Cristot had been planned according to the January 1944, 21st Army Group infantry-tank theory, in which an attack was to be made in waves, with tanks followed by infantry and then more tanks. Experience showed that in close country, tanks must attack with the infantry and even then, casualties for tanks and infantry would be high, as it was extremely difficult for tanks to watch accompanying infantry. The attempts by XXX Corps to advance round the open German flank at Caumont and the 3rd Canadian Infantry Division to capture high ground around Le Mesnil-Patry, with tank forces supported by infantry rather than vice versa, were not tried again until Operation Goodwood. Having experienced similar losses to those of the 12th SS-Panzer Division during the first few days, the Anglo-Canadians began to accumulate resources to conduct set-piece attrition attacks. German attacks had similar results; the 12th SS-Panzer Division operation order of 7 June, required the division to throw the Allies into the sea but the attempt was a costly failure. The Germans changed tactics and began to limit counter-attacks to restore a defence in depth, rather than continue the failed counter-offensive against the invasion.

=== Casualties ===
D Company of the Queen's Own had 96 casualties, most listed as missing. During the day 80 men of the 6th Armoured Regiment and 99 men of the Queen's Own Rifles were lost. In 1997 McNorgan recorded 148 Canadian and 189 German casualties and three German tanks knocked out. Rots was consolidated by the Chaudières, who were reported to have buried 122 Panzergrenadiers; 46 Royal Marine Commando suffered 17 killed, 9 wounded and 35 missing. The defence of Cristot cost SS-Panzeraufklärungsabteilung 12 c. 70 casualties and the 6th Green Howards 250 casualties. When the fighting in the area diminished after 14 June, Sergeant Gariepy, commander of the B Squadron tank which had escaped from Le Mesnil-Patry and the 1st Hussar padre went out to identify the dead and recover identity discs. A few days after the Canadian attack, more than 2,400 German dead were said to have been found on the battlefield, although this appears to be an exaggeration.

=== Atrocities ===
Men of the Headquarters Company of the Queen's Own Rifles were ordered to search for Canadian dead, before the Canadians withdrew completely from the area. Among them was Bill Bettridge, who discovered 6 Queen's Own Riflemen from D Company, who all had the same wound. Bettridge later wrote that

After the tanks retreated from there, the Germans got up and started searching for anybody that was still alive and they just put a bullet through all their heads so the six of them were all killed, all murdered.

following the action at Le Mesnil-Patry, troops of the 12th SS-Panzer Division captured seven Canadians, who had been wandering around no-man's land since the battle, all being tired and hungry. The men were interrogated by an officer of the 12th SS-Pioneer Battalion at an ad hoc headquarters in the village of Mouen, about 5 mi (8.0 km) south-east of Le Mesnil-Patry. On 14 June, two crew members of the 1st Hussars reached Canadian lines and reported that they had seen several Canadian prisoners shot in the back after surrendering. A First Canadian Army inquest Report of the Court of Inquiry Re: The Shooting of Prisoners of War by German Armed Forces at Mouen, Calvados, Normandy, 17 June 1944, listed

- B49476 - Trooper Perry, C. G. - Canadian Armoured Corps
- B43258 - Sergeant McLaughlin, T. C. - Queen's Own Rifles of Canada
- Rifleman Campbell, J. R. - Queen's Own Rifles of Canada
- B138240 - Rifleman Willett, G. L. - Queen's Own Rifles of Canada
- B138453 - Rifleman Cranfield, E. - Queen's Own Rifles of Canada
- B144191 - Corporal Cook, E. - Queen's Own Rifles of Canada
- B42653 - Rifleman Bullock, P. - Queen's Own Rifles of Canada

At about 10:00 p.m., the men had been led to the outskirts of the village under armed guard. Cook, Cranfield, Perry and Willett were killed by a firing squad and the remaining men were shot in the head at close-range. In the First Canadian Army report it was concluded

That all the above named soldiers were murdered by the German armed forces in violation of the well recognised laws and usages of war and the terms of the Geneva Convention of 1929. That the above named soldiers were at the time of their deaths prisoners of war and entitled to treatment as such. That the soldiers were, on the date of their deaths, in the custody of a detachment of the 12th SS Panzer Engineer Battalion, probably the Third Company of that battalion. That the commanding officer of the said battalion was a certain Sturmbanfuhrer ("Major") Muller, but there is no evidence whether the Headquarters of the battalion or its commanding officer were present in Mouen on the date of the incident. That one or more of the officers or NCO's [sic] of the said battalion were responsible for the murder of the said Canadian Soldiers. That fourteen German soldiers who escorted the said Canadian soldiers to the place where they were murdered, and whose names, with one exception, are at present unknown to the Court, are equally implicated with their officers or NCO's in the said murder. The exception referred to is SS. Mann Alfred Friedrich, now deceased.

— Report: First Canadian Army

the SS made the local French villagers dig a mass grave and bury the men, which was discovered by troops of the 49th (West Riding) Division when they captured the village on 25 June. With the murders of prisoners taken at Le Mesnil-Patry on 11 June, 147 Canadians are known to have been killed by the 12th SS-Panzer Division. If the ratio between combat deaths and POW murders is taken from 7 to 11 June, when the 3rd Canadian and 12th SS Divisions met on the battlefield, 20 per cent of 677 deaths in the 3rd Canadian Division, were of men murdered after capture. Stories of German atrocities circulated swiftly among Canadian troops and an order-of-the-day instructed the Canadians to take no prisoners, until quickly countermanded by higher authority.

Four members of the 12th SS-Panzer Division were prosecuted for the crime:

On 21 October 1948, proceedings were opened against Bernhard Siebken, Dietrich Schnabel, Heinrich Albers, and Fritz Bundschuh before a British military court in Hamburg. The four defendants, all former members of the 2nd Battalion of the 26th Panzer Grenadier Regiment, were charged with the murder of the Canadian prisoners Harold Angel, Frederick Holness, and Ernest Baskerville at the battalion's headquarters on the morning of 9 June 1944. The trial lasted almost three weeks, during which substantial evidence was adduced proving the complicity of each of the defendants in the killings. On 9 November 1948, the court announced its verdict: Albers and Bundschuh, the trigger men, were acquitted on the grounds that they had followed superior orders, while Siebken, the battalion commander, and Schnabel, his special missions officer, were found guilty of having issued and carried out the execution order.

— Margolian

Siebken and Schnabel were sentenced to death and hanged at Hamelin Prison on January 20, 1949.

== Bibliography ==
- Copp, T. (2003). Fields of Fire: The Canadians in Normandy. Toronto: University of Toronto Press. ISBN 0-8020-3780-1.
- Ellis, Major L. F.; Allen, G. R. G.; Warhurst, A. E. & Robb, J. (2004) [1962]. Butler, J. R. M. (ed.). Victory in the West: The Battle of Normandy. History of the Second World War: United Kingdom Military Series. Vol. I (Naval & Military Press ed.). London: HMSO. ISBN 1-84574-058-0.
- Ford, K. (2004). Sword Beach. Battle Zone Normandy. Stroud: Sutton Publishing. ISBN 0-7509-3019-5.
- Jarymowycz, R. J. (1997). The Quest for Operational Maneuver in the Normandy Campaign: Simonds and Montgomery Attempt the Armoured Breakout (PDF) (PhD thesis). Department of History, McGill University. OCLC 428095960.
- Keegan, J. (1989). The Times Atlas of the Second World War (Crescent Books 1995 ed.). London: Times Books. ISBN 0-51712-377-0.
- Margolian, H. (1998). Conduct Unbecoming: the Story of the Murder of Canadian Prisoners of War in Normandy. Toronto: University of Toronto Press. ISBN 0-80204-213-9 – via Archive Foundation.
- Martin, C. C.; Whitsed, R. (2008). Battle Diary: From D-Day and Normandy to the Zuider Zee and VE. Toronto: Dundurn Press. ISBN 978-1-55488-092-8.
- McKee, A. (1972) [1964]. Caen: Anvil of Victory (Pan ed.). London: Souvenir Press. ISBN 978-0-330-23368-2.
- McNorgan, M. R. (1997). "Debacle in Normandy, Le Mesnil-Patry, 11 June 1944". Steel Chariots: A Resource Site for the Canadian Armour Enthusiast.
- Reid, B. A. (2005). No Holding Back: Operation Totalize, Normandy, August 1944. Toronto: Robin Brass Studio. ISBN 1-896941-40-0.
- Scarfe, N. (2006) [1947]. Assault Division: A History of the 3rd Division from the Invasion of Normandy to the Surrender of Germany. Stroud, Gloucestershire: Spellmount. ISBN 1-86227-338-3.
- Stacey, C. P.; Bond, C. C. J. (1960). The Victory Campaign: The Operations in North-West Europe 1944–1945 (PDF). Official History of the Canadian Army in the Second World War. Vol. III. Ottawa: The Queen's Printer and Controller of Stationery. OCLC 606015967. Archived from the original (PDF) on 21 December 2020.
- Stark, F. (2009) [1951]. "A History of the First Hussars Regiment, 6–11 June". War Chronicle. Part 2. Archived from the original on 5 December 2013.
- Williams, E. R. (2007). 50 Div in Normandy: A Critical Analysis of the British 50th (Northumbrian) Division on D-Day and in the Battle of Normandy (pdf) (MMAS). Fort Leavenworth KS: Army Command and General Staff College. OCLC 832005669.
