= Sunfest (London, Ontario) =

Annual Canadian festival in London, Ontario

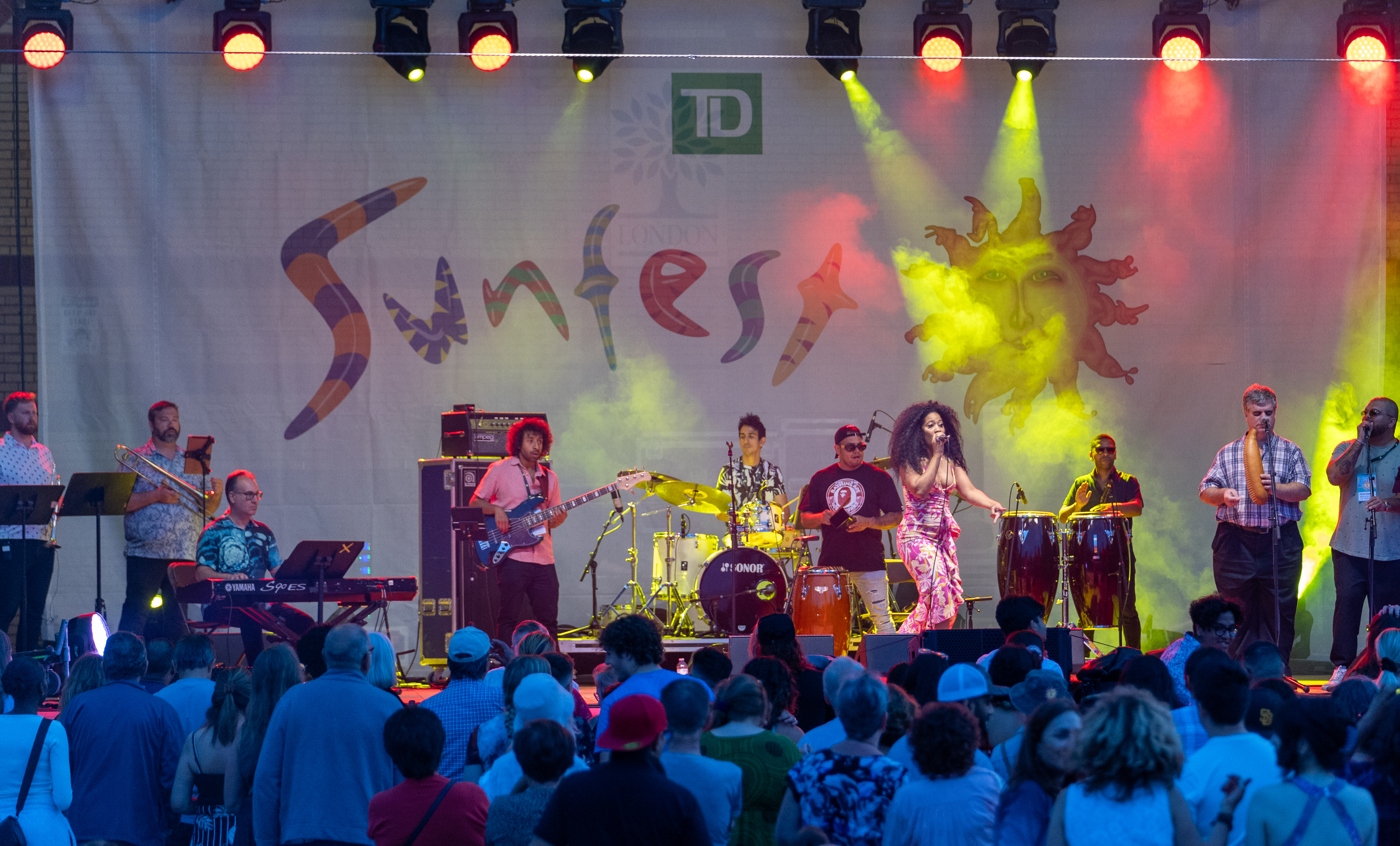
- The band Marta Elena y Su Orquestra performing at the main stage in 2023, in front of curtain with the festival's logo
- Genre: Food, Art, Music, Entertainment
- Frequency: Annual
- Locations: Victoria Park, London, Canada
- Years active: 1995–present
- Attendance: 275,000
- Website: Official Web Site

Sunfest is an annual Canadian festival of food, culture, art, and music that takes place in London, Ontario, Canada, in July. The festival venue is Victoria Park and is typically held the weekend after Canada Day. During Sunfest, music from various cultures is performed on the main bandstand in the park and 4 other stages. The rest of the park is covered with craft vendors selling their goods. A key part of the festival is the large number of food stands selling foods from all different ethnic backgrounds.

Sunfest was first proposed for 1994, but insufficient funds were raised. In 1995 $40,000 was raised, enough for the festival to be held that year. The festival started with just 3000 visitors. In 2014, Sunfest attracted more than 275,000 visitors.
