= Victoria Park, London, Ontario =

Major park in London, Ontario

Coordinates: 42.9890°N 81.2486°W

Victoria Park
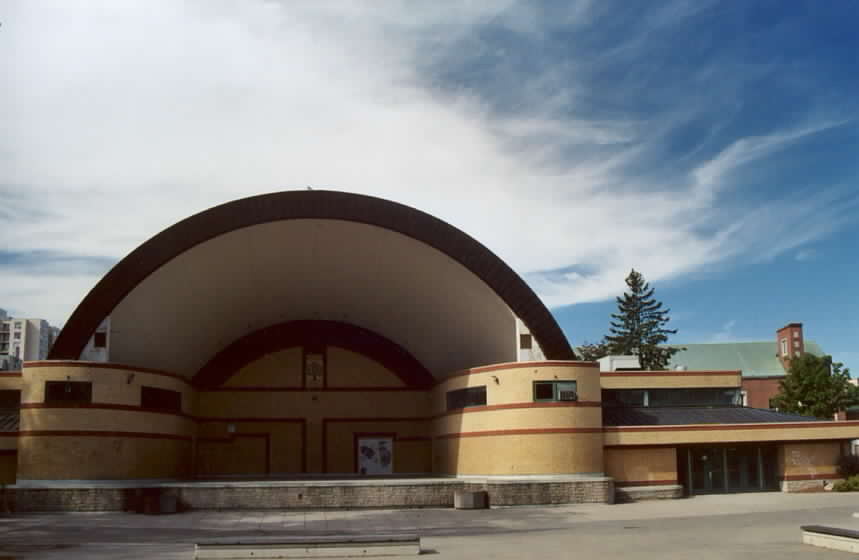
- The Band Shell in Victoria Park
- Interactive map of Victoria Park
- Type: Public park
- Location: London, Ontario
- Area: 7.3 hectares (18 acres)
- Created: 1874
- Operator: City of London

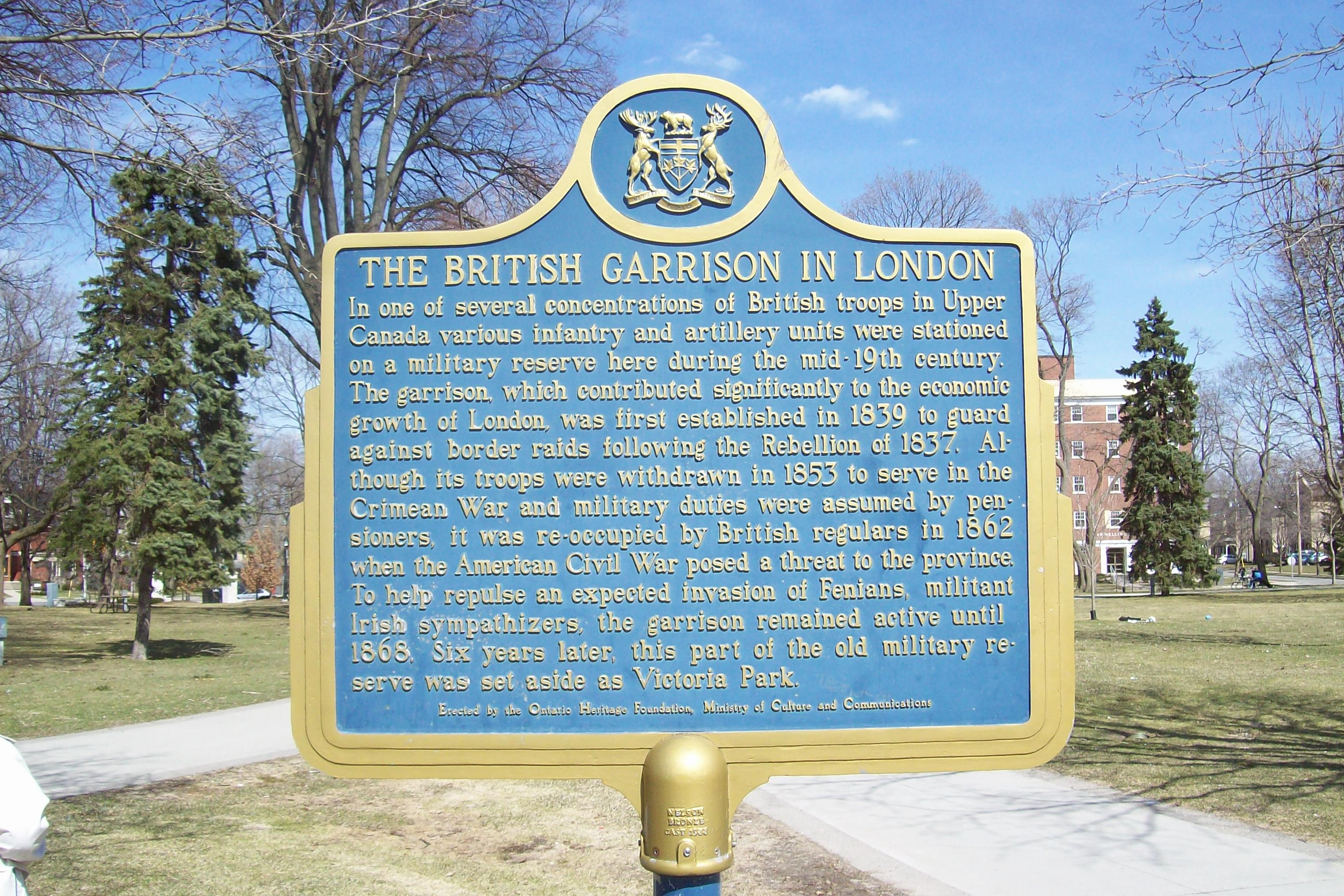
Victoria Park

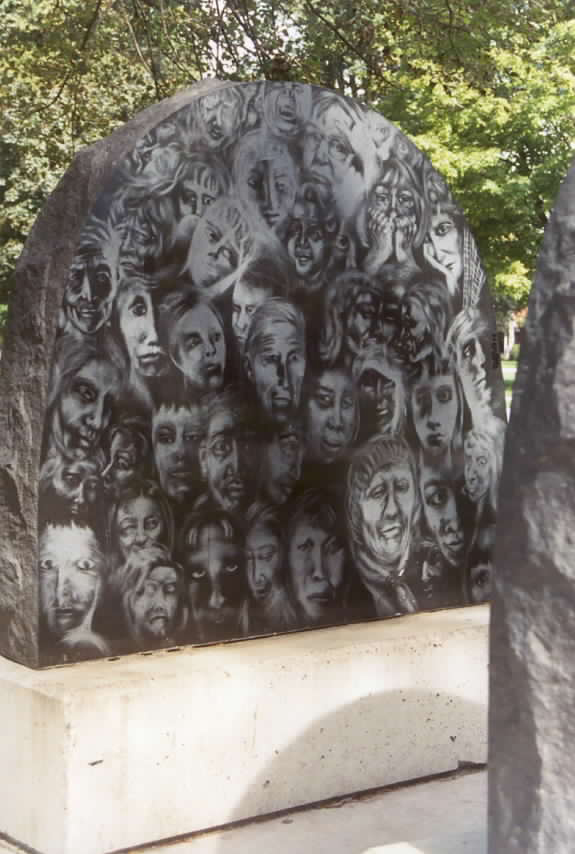
Women's Memorial

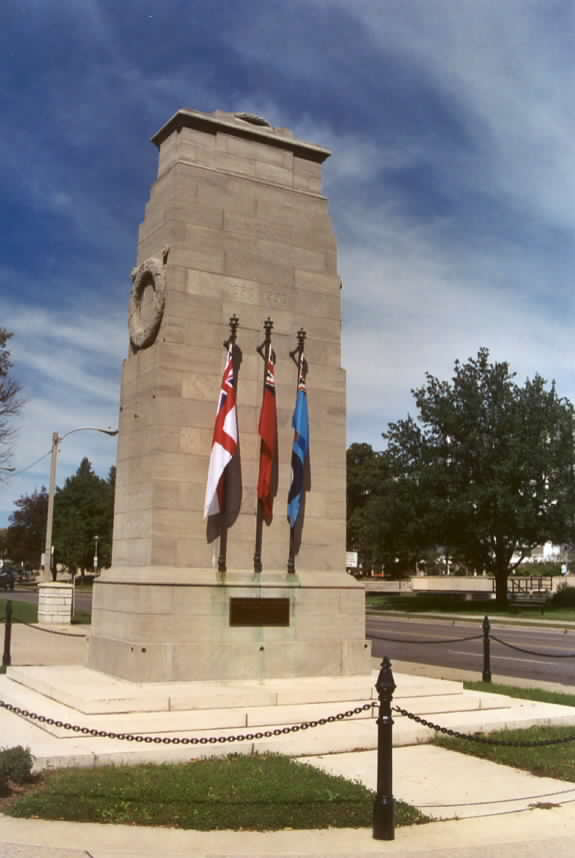
Cenotaph

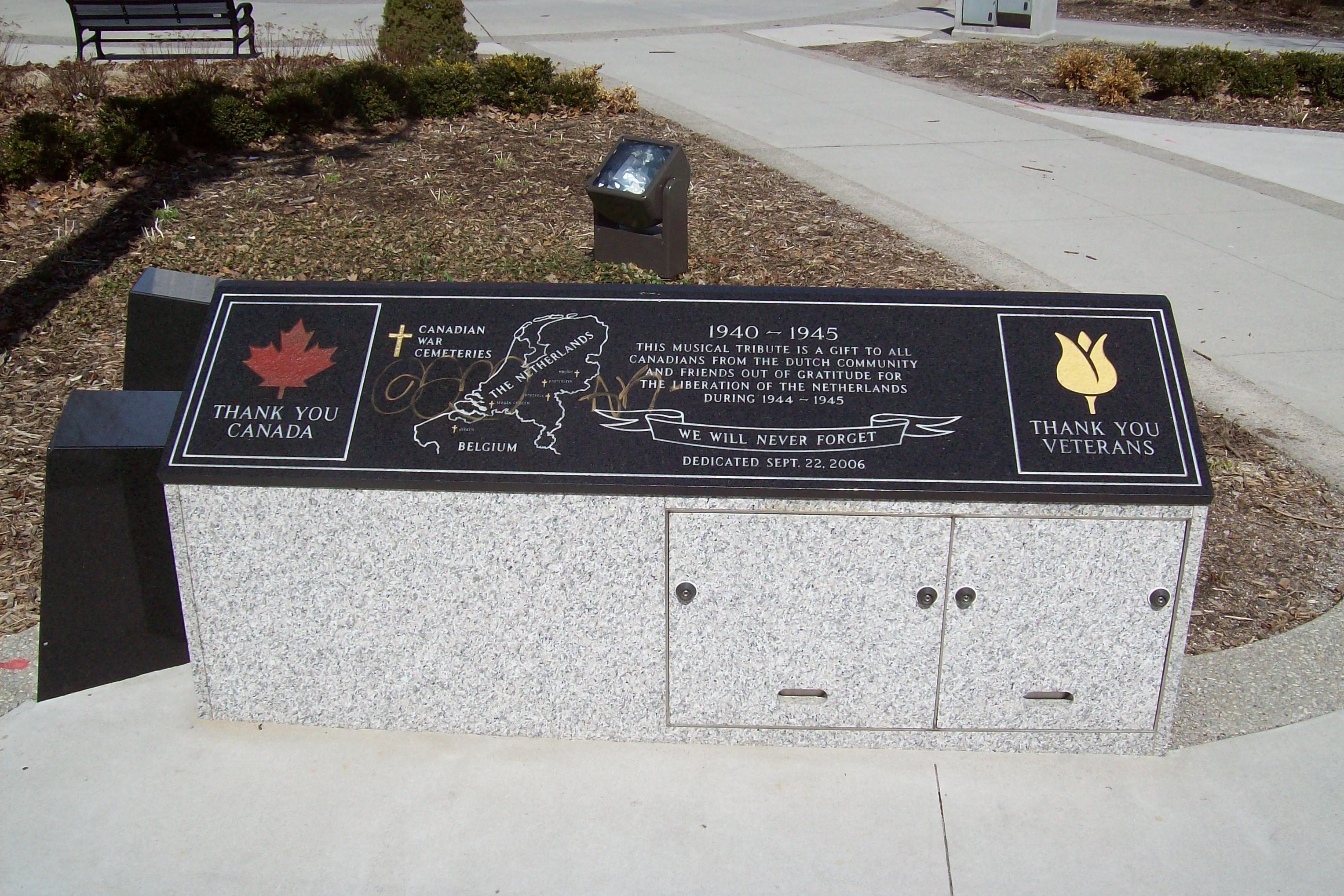
Veterans plaque

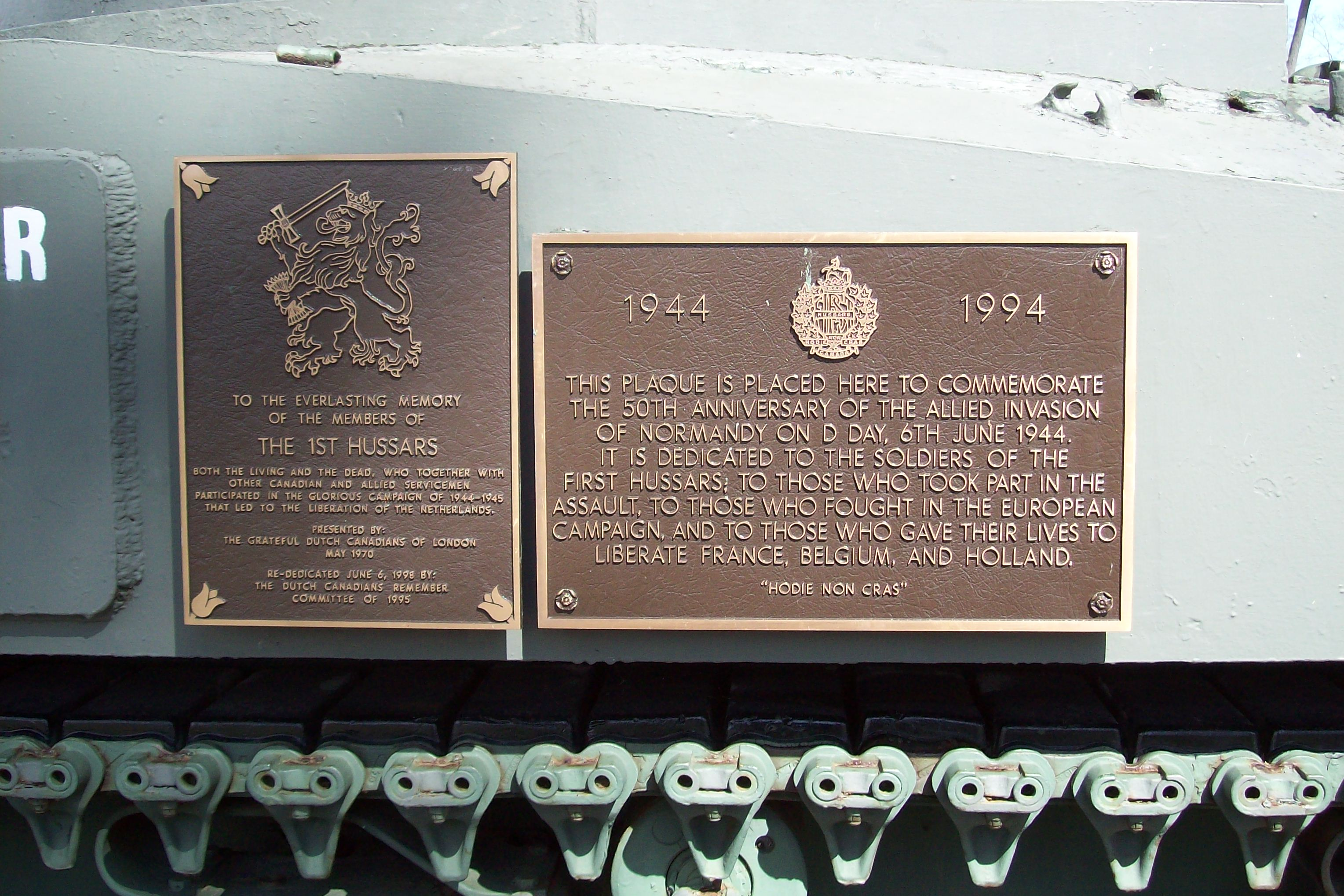
Second World War tank

Victoria Park is an 7.3 hectare (18-acre) park located in downtown London, Ontario, in Canada. It is one of the major centres of community events in London.

== History ==
The park was originally the site of the British garrison, as well as the cricket grounds. The garrison was expanded with new buildings during and after the Upper Canada Rebellion in 1837. The British troops withdrew to Europe in 1853 to train for the Crimean War, but their barracks were used to house escaped slaves from the United States, as one of the end stations of the Underground Railway. The troops returned in 1861, fearing that the American Civil War might spread to Canada. In 1874, the park was transferred to the city and renamed Victoria Park, after Queen Victoria.

The park's original plan was the work of the landscape architect Charles H. Miller, chief gardener of Fairmount Park in Philadelphia, Pennsylvania, and designer of the American Centennial Exposition grounds. It is believed that the decision to hire Miller was strongly influenced by William Saunders' visit to the exposition grounds in 1876.

Although designated for recreational activities, the park was still used as a military garrison when necessary. As London was the centre of the Western Ontario military district (District No. 1), troops were stationed in the park during the Second Boer War, World War I, and World War II; there was some minor rioting in the park during the Conscription Crisis of 1944, when conscripts demanded to be sent to Europe.

In 1907, three cannons from the Crimean War were placed in the park, originally from Sevastopol. In 1912 a statue was built as a memorial to the Boer War, and an exact replica of the cenotaph in Whitehall, London, England was built in 1934. A Sherman tank (known as the "Holy Roller") used in World War II was placed there in 1950. While the park once housed elaborate fountains and a lilypond, there are no water features remaining today.

== Activities ==
Many annual events are held in Victoria Park. These include Sunfest, the Home County Folk Festival, The London Rib-Fest, The International Food Festival, LOLA and Fiesta del Sol. Since 2008 all events in Victoria Park are part of the Greening of the Festivals and required to have a waste management plan to eliminate unnecessary waste to landfill. This includes a suitable number of Eco-Stations (the place where attendees dispose of waste) and all food and beverage containers are required to be either recyclable or compostable. In the first year, these efforts led to an improvement from 5% waste diversion to a 50% waste diversion from landfill. The festivals were recognized Nationally with a Home Town Heroes Award, Provincially with a Gold Award from the Recycling Council of Ontario for Minimization of Waste and Municipally with the Pillar non profit Community Impact Award. Home County Folk Festival had the added initiative of offering reusable metal dishes, available on deposit which is repaid at the Eco-Stations, to eliminate one time use disposables altogether. With the EcoStations readily available for waste disposal, Victoria Park has been a cleaner park throughout the festival season. In addition, the festivals have educated hundreds of thousands of festival attendees on wasteful practices and inspired them to take these practices to their community events, birthday parties and church suppers.

Every winter, there is an annual vigil for the École Polytechnique Massacre, the trees in the park are decorated with Christmas lights, the "Lighting of the Lights" and Snowfest is held in February. The number and frequency of events has been a concern for the park with the resulting damage to the foliage, prompting some partial rescheduling to minimize the wear.

The park also has an ice skating rink in the winter, which has been built every winter since 1913. The bandshell was built in 1950 (rebuilt in 1990). The area in front of the bandshell now serves as a free, public skatepark, consisting of many metal benches and a stage drop (security persists on no one to sit or utilize the bandshell except for festivals or major events). Near the bandshell is the Women's Memorial for the victims of the École Polytechnique massacre in Montreal, built in 1994.

The park is notable for the presence of a large number of melanistic (black) Eastern Gray Squirrels (Sciurus carolinensis), and because of this, the recreational sport of squirrel fishing has developed in the area. However the squirrel population is not indigenous; they were first introduced to the park in 1914, when four pairs of squirrels were purchased. In February 1961 a group of squirrels were taken to Kent State University, in Ohio, United States, where they have become firmly established.

== See also ==
Royal eponyms in Canada
