= John Amabile =

John Amabile may refer to:

- John Amabile (interior designer) (born 1964), Scottish interior designer
- John Amabile (American football) (1939–2012), American football scout
- John Amabile (bobsleigh) (born 1962), American-Puerto Rican bobsleigher and criminal
