= Amabile Choirs of London, Canada =

- Abbreviation: ACL
- Formation: 1985
- Type: Choir organization based in Canada
- Legal status: active
- Purpose: advocate and public voice, educator and network
- Headquarters: London, Ontario, Canada
- Region served: London, Ontario, Canada
- Official language: English, French
- Website: Official website

The Amabile Choirs of London, Canada is a nonprofit organization with the purpose of bringing together young singers from London, Ontario and surrounding areas. They are "regarded as among the premiere choral ensembles for children and youth," according to The Canadian Encyclopedia, the national encyclopedia of Canada.

This family of choirs began in 1985 with John Barron and Brenda Zadorsky founding the Amabile Youth Singers, and has since grown to nine choirs under the direction of eleven conductors. The Junior Amabile Singers followed in 1989, and the Amabile Boys Choirs were established in 1990.

== Overview ==
=== Amabile for Girls and Women ===
There are four levels of choirs for girls and women within the Amabile organization. The Amabile Da Capo Choir is a training choir welcoming girls aged 8 to 11. Da Capo aimsKatrina Zadorsky to provide a choral venue for young choristers and serve as a training choir for the Junior Amabile Singers. Da Capo performs as guests of the more senior Amabile Choirs throughout the season under the direction of Jacquelyn Norman, Tammy Rees, and Rachel Wohlgemut. The Junior Amabile Singers (JAS) is an all-female choir for singers aged 9 to 14. The JAS are under the direction of Jacquelyn Norman and TammyRees. The Amabile Youth Singers - Soprano/Alto (AYS) is an all-female choir featuring singers who range in age from 13 to 21. Under the direction of Brenda Zadorsky, and Katrina Zadorsky. Prima is the women's choir, open to adult women (over 18), who have highly experienced vocal skills and wish to work on advanced repertoire. Under the direction of Brenda Zadorsky and Jacquelyn Norman. On occasion, the AYS and Prima will perform together as the Amabile Young Women's Ensemble (AYWE).

=== Amabile for Boys and Men ===
There are four levels of choirs for boys and men within the Amabile organization. The boys' and men's choirs are under the artistic direction of Dr. Carol Beynon and Ken Fleet, with the assistance of John Vermue and Danielle Sirek who work with the TTC and Jeff Beynon and Rosemary Bannerman work with the TCC. The Treble Training Choir (TTC) is a training choir welcoming boys ages 11-15. For many younger boys who audition, this is their first experience with choral singing. The Treble Concert Choir (TCC) is an all-boy choir for unchanged voices. Boys aged 8 and above with experience singing may audition for this choir but most become part of the training choir first, for one or two years, before joining this group. The Amabile Youth Singers Tenor/Bass is an all-male choir for changed voices, made up primarily of young men of high school age. Primus is the men's ensemble and is made up of adult men (over 18) with advanced vocal skills. Primus is pronounced PREE-moose. Quite often, the Youth Singers TB and Primus perform together as the Amabile Young Men's Ensemble (AYME).

=== Guest conductors ===
The choirs brings guest conductors and composers each year many who are renowned such as Francisco Núñez and Bob Chilcott.

== Achievements ==
The Amabile choirs have been "much decorated" at international choral competitions. They are "regarded as among the premiere choral ensembles for children and youth."

The choir marked its 35th anniversary with a music video as noted by CTV News. Due to COVID restrictions, the choir recorded its annual Christmas concert in a parking garage, as noted by CBC.ca.

- The Junior Amabile Singers competed in the 2012 Golden Gate International Children's and Youth Choirs Festival in Berkeley California. They were awarded first place in the Children's Folk Music Category and second in the Children's Historical Music Class. The choir previously earned gold medals in the 1st Choir Olympics, Linz Austria and 3rd Choir Olympics, Bremen Germany.
- They performed at Victoria Park during the welcome ceremony for the Olympic Torch in 2010.
- In 2010 the Jack Richardson Music Awards steering committee inducted them into the London Music Hall of Fame.
- Amabile Choirs Youth Singers won the 1986 CBC Choral Competition, and second place at the International Koorfestival in the Netherlands in 1987.
