= Holy Roller (tank) =

Canadian Army M4A2 Sherman tank

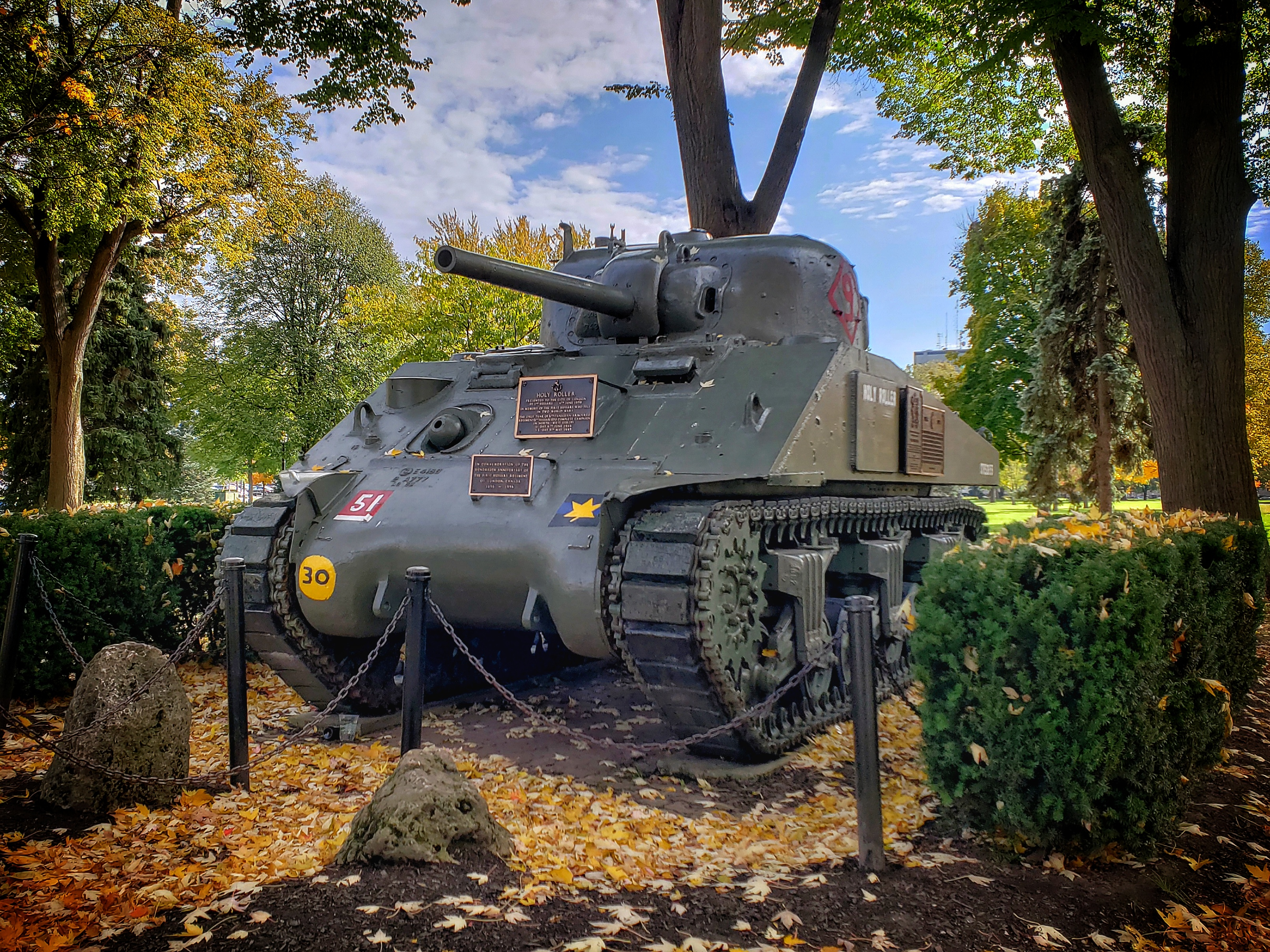
Holy Roller in 2018, London, Ontario

Holy Roller is a Canadian Army M4A2 Sherman tank of the 6th Armoured Regiment (1st Hussars) which landed at D-Day and fought across northwest Europe until the end of the Second World War in Europe, one of two Canadian tanks that fought from D-Day to VE Day, the other being Bomb. Holy Roller is on display as a memorial in Victoria Park, London, Ontario.

== Origin ==
Holy Roller was built at General Motors' Fisher Tank Arsenal in Flint, Michigan, in the last week of September 1942. It is an M4A2(75) model with serial number 7606 and U.S. registration number 3062855. It was shipped to England, where it was issued with the War Department number CT-152655. It was not until late May/early June 1944, that it was issued to the 6th Armoured Regiment (1st Hussars), just before D-Day.

== Battle service ==
Holy Roller landed with the 6th Armoured Regiment (1st Hussars) at Juno Beach, crewed by William Reed, George LeGrand, Frank White, Frank Fowler (who coined the name "Holy Roller"), Terry Doherty and Everett Smith. It served throughout the North-West Europe Campaign in France, Belgium, the Netherlands and into Germany.

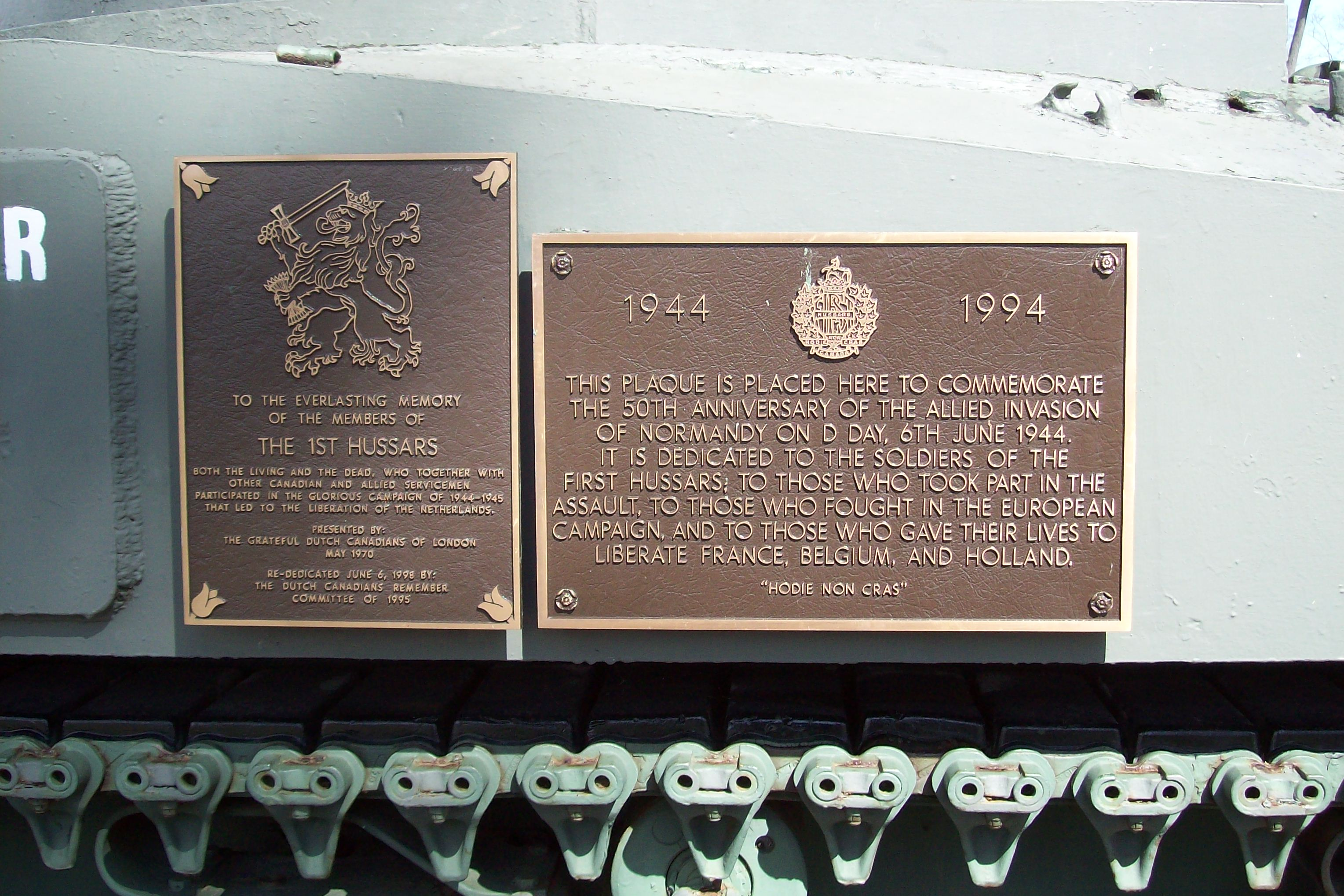
Plaques that commemorate the 1st Hussars and the 50th anniversary of D-Day

== Preservation ==
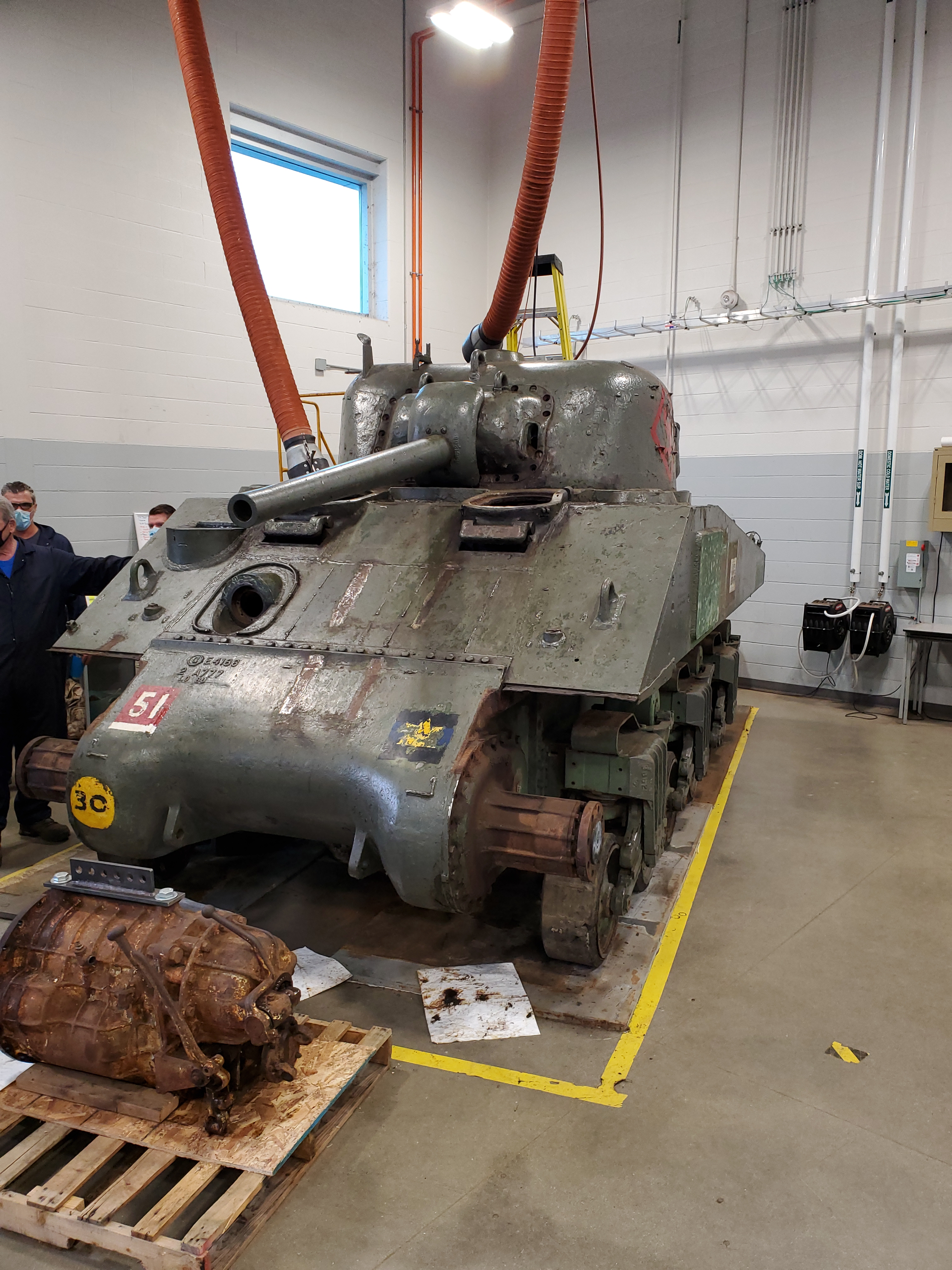
Holy Roller under restoration and preservation at the Fanshawe College Centre for Applied Transportation Technologies. The transmission is in the foreground.

Holy Roller is one of four Canadian tanks shipped from service in northwestern Europe to preservation in Canada, along with Forceful III in Ottawa and Bomb in Sherbrooke, Quebec. The tank was placed on display outside the London Armouries on Dundas Street, then moved to Queens Park at the Western Fairgrounds before finally being moved to its current location in Victoria Park.

In early 2021, the Royal Canadian Legion and a local craft brewer launched a campaign to raise $250,000 to finance a year-long restoration of the tank. Holy Roller was removed from Victoria Park and disassembled, with parts being restored, repaired, or replaced as necessary, then the tank was returned to the park in time for the 78th anniversary of D-Day on June 6, 2022. The Toboggan Brewing Company created Holy Roller Lager to support the campaign, contributing a portion of sales of cases of the beer to the project.

The refurbished tank was hoisted onto a new concrete pad on May 31, 2022.
