= 1st Hussars =

Regiment of the Canadian Army

- Active: 1856–present
- Country: Province of Canada (1856–1867); Canada (1867–present)
- Branch: Canadian Army
- Type: Line cavalry
- Role: Armoured cavalry
- Size: One regiment
- Part of: 31 Canadian Brigade Group
- Garrison/HQ: London, Sarnia
- Motto: Hodie non cras (Latin for 'today not tomorrow')
- March: "Bonnie Dundee"
- Anniversaries: Juno Beach, Le Mesnil-Patry
- Engagements: Fenian Raids; Second Boer War; First World War; Second World War; War in Afghanistan
- Battle honours: See #Battle honours

Commanders
- Current commander: Lieutenant-Colonel Wayne Finkle
- Honorary colonel: Tania Lee

Insignia
- Abbreviation: 1 H
- NATO Map Symbol

The 1st Hussars is an armoured Primary Reserve regiment of the Canadian Armed Forces, based in London and Sarnia, Ontario.

== Regimental seniority ==
Despite "1st" in the title, the regiment is not the most senior armoured unit. With the militia reorganization of 1872, the senior or only cavalry regiment within a Militia District adopted the numerical designation of that district. Southwestern Ontario comprised Military District No. 1, hence the original designation as the 1st Regiment of Cavalry. The unit was renamed 1st Hussars in 1892 and because a British hussar unit numbered "1" never existed, it was unnecessary to add a 'Canada' or 'Canadian' modifier. Following the Second World War, because of wartime and earlier conversion to armour of some more senior infantry regiments, the Royal Canadian Armoured Corps decided that seniority would be determined by the date of becoming a regiment, regardless of the corps in which the unit was raised. Regular Force regiments take precedence, and seniority among themselves by the date they became part of the Regular Force. 1st Hussars is placed seventh in the order of seniority of militia armoured regiments.

== Early history ==
=== Foundation and organisation ===
The 1st Hussars traces its roots to the formation of the St. Thomas Troop of Volunteer Militia Cavalry in March 1856 and the First Troop of Volunteer Militia Cavalry of London in July of the same year. In 1863, these units were redesignated the St. Thomas Troop of Cavalry and the London Troop of Cavalry, respectively. Both troops were put on active duty in southwestern Ontario in response to the Fenian raid of 1866, but neither had contact with the invading forces.

The two troops were consolidated under one headquarters, forming the St. Thomas and London Squadron of Canada in January 1867. Both troops were again called into active service during the 1870 Fenian invasion, but again neither saw action.

In May 1872, the squadron was expanded with four additional cavalry troops, for a total of six, to become the 1st Regiment of Cavalry, headquartered in St. Thomas. Subunits included:

- No. 1 Troop - St. Thomas.
- No. 2 Troop - London.
- No. 3 Troop - Mooretown, Lambton County.
- No. 4 Troop - Kingsville, Essex County.
- No. 5 Troop - Bayfield, Huron County.
- No. 6 Troop - Unallocated.

No. 5 and No. 6 Troops disbanded in 1874. In 1880, regimental headquarters moved to London, where it has remained to this day. The 1st Regiment of Cavalry was redesignated the 1st Regiment of Cavalry Hussars in 1888, and 1st Hussars in 1892. In 1896 and 1897, the remaining four troops' numbered designations were replaced with letters and the troops were renamed as squadrons.

In February 1905, the regiment moved into the newly built London Armouries at the corner of Dundas and Waterloo Streets, which it used until 1977. By 1913, 'A' Squadron had moved to London from St. Thomas, 'C' Squadron had moved from Mooretown to Courtright, where it was disbanded, and 'D' Squadron had moved from Kingsville to Amherstburg, where it was renamed 'C' Squadron after the disbandment of the Courtright squadron.

=== 1st Hussars in South Africa ===
October 1899 saw the outbreak of the Second Boer War between the British Empire and the Boer republics of the Orange Free State and the Transvaal Republic.

Although the 1st Hussars did not participate as a unit, 27 of the regiment's members went to South Africa with other units of the Canadian Army.

Six Hussars joined the special service battalion of The Royal Canadian Regiment of Infantry and participated in the engagements at Sunnyside, Paardeberg and the capture of Pretoria.

Another 15 Hussars joined 'A' Squadron, 1st Battalion of the Canadian Mounted Rifles (later renamed the Royal Canadian Dragoons). The 1st Battalion CMR arrived in South Africa in March 1900 and fought in the region, participating in the March to Pretoria and the Battle of Leliefontein on the Komati River in November 1900 before returning to Canada.

In 1901, six members of the 1st Hussars joined the newly established South African Constabulary.

== First World War ==
=== Mobilization and deployment ===
As with the Boer War, the 1st Hussars did not participate as a unit.

At the outbreak of the war, some 66 members of the regiment joined the 1st Western Ontario Battalion of the Canadian Expeditionary Force which was raised in late 1914. The Western Ontario Battalion was present at the Second Battle of Ypres.

In November 1914, the 7th Canadian Mounted Rifles was raised. 'A' Squadron was recruited in London, 'B' Squadron drew men from Windsor, Sarnia and Amherstburg and 'C' Squadron was raised in Toronto. 'A' Squadron was attached to the 2nd Canadian Division in March 1915 as the divisional cavalry squadron. In June 1915, 7 CMR sailed for England. In January 1916, 'A' Squadron was renamed Special Service Squadron, First (Canadian) Hussars to reflect the unit's roots in 1st Hussars. By mid-May 1916, the squadron became part of the Canadian Corps Cavalry Regiment, later renamed the Canadian Light Horse, forming 'B' Squadron of the regiment.

=== Vimy Ridge ===
On 9 April 1917, the Battle of Vimy Ridge commenced. During the battle, the CLH was committed on the southern flank of the line where elements of the regiment were tasked with reconnaissance towards the village of Willerval to determine if a breakthrough would be possible, or if the village could be held. Two mounted patrols set out at around 4:30 p.m., one approaching from the north and the other from the south. The northern patrol entered the village and was able to take about 15 prisoners before withdrawing under fire from a German machine-gun. The southern patrol ran into a German position and was also forced to withdraw under fire. The two patrols lost six men killed, six wounded and another three missing.

=== Hundred Days Offensive ===
==== Amiens to Canal Du Nord ====
From 8 August 1918 to 28 August, The 1st Hussars of the Canadian Light Horse were tasked mostly as despatch riders, traffic controllers and in other support roles in the rear of the Canadian Corps at Amiens. On 9 August, five members of 'B' Squadron attempted to capture a German ammunition convoy they had spotted while running messages. Although they were unsuccessful in capturing the wagons, they managed to take some 20 prisoners.

The CLH moved into the Canal Du Nord area on the night of 26 September to 27 September. Some elements of the regiment performed costly reconnaissance patrols in the area while the unit waited in reserve just behind the lines for a breakthrough that the cavalry could exploit.

==== Escaudoeuvres and Erclin River ====
On 9 October 1918, the Canadian Corps attacked the Germans near the French village of Escaudoeuvres on the L'Escaut Canal (north-east of Cambrai). By this point, the battlefield was becoming more fluid, and cavalry played a more important role during operations. On the 9th, the CLH was ordered to occupy two pieces of high ground in front of 5 Canadian Infantry Brigade's position. Just after noon, 'B' Squadron CLH was ordered forward with 'A' and 'C' Squadrons in support. The troops advanced across the canal and approached a rail line that ran along the ridge on the far bank. As the troops closed on the rail line, machine-guns opened up on the right hitting several men and horses. The situation on the left of the advance developed in a similar fashion with MGs opening up as the troopers crested the rail embankment. One of the German MGs was put out of action allowing a position to be established and Hotchkiss Machine guns to be set up on the rail embankment. One troop to outflank the remaining German MGs, but they were unsuccessful. The position was held and passed on to the 25th Battalion, CEF and the CLH troops retired. One non-commissioned officer (William Henry Wells) was killed and 11 men were wounded in the action which gained 2500 meters of ground and inflicted at least 20 casualties on the Germans and captured two German MGs.

The next day the First Hussars participated in an action that saw the last of the few cavalry charges in Canadian history. The Canadian Corps continued to advance on the far bank of the canal. The village of Naves was captured by the 19th Battalion, CEF, which continued to capture a ridgeline to the east. The objective for 'A' and 'C' Squadrons of the CLH was to capture a portion of sunken road on the ridgeline and continue on to take a hill overlooking the village of Iwuy . 'B' Squadron was held in reserve. 'A' and 'C' Squadrons forded the Erclin River and charged up the hill towards the sunken road. The charge resulted in 23 dead troopers and 66 dead horses, but despite the losses, the hill was taken and held.

As the Hundred Day's offensive continued, the 1st Hussars and rest of the CLH found itself often leading the advance, and letting the infantry pass through when resistance was met.

Members of the 1st Hussars also participated in the following actions, among others:

- Second Battle of Ypres
- Battle of Flers-Courcelette
- Battle of Hill 70
- Battle of Passchendaele

== Second World War ==
=== Mobilization and deployment ===
"Defence Scheme Number 3" was implemented on 1 September 1939 and saw the raising of the 1st Canadian Division, Canadian Active Service Force. The 1st Hussars provided Divisional Cavalry for CASF (1st Division). In December 1939, the majority of 1st Division sailed for England, but the 1st Hussars stayed behind in London because there were not enough tanks to equip the regiment.

In January 1940, 1st Hussars contributed the Headquarters Squadron and 'C' Squadron to the First Canadian Cavalry Regiment (Mechanised) (1 CCR (M)). ('A' Squadron was mainly supplied by the Royal Canadian Dragoons and 'B' Squadron was filled by members of Lord Strathcona's Horse.). 1 CCR (M) was still part of the 1st Canadian Division. In May 1940, 1 CCR (M) left London for Camp Borden where they trained on the Carden-Loyd Machine Carrier, the Vickers Mk. VIB Light Tank and the American M1917 light tank. Although these tanks were obsolete, they served the purpose of training the regiment's members in tactics and vehicle maintenance.

In January 1941, the Squadrons of 1 CCR (M) returned to their respective units as they became mobilised as regiments.

The Canadian Armoured Corps (CAC) was raised in August 1940 and the 1st Hussars found themselves organised within it. In spring of 1941, 1st Hussars, now the 6th Canadian Armoured Regiment (1st Hussars) (6 CAR), became part of the 1st Canadian Armoured Brigade, which departed to England in October 1941. The regiment took up residence in Aldershot where they continued their training. In early 1942, 6 CAR received some M3 Lee tanks and Canadian Ram Mk. Is and IIs. The Hussars remained a part of 1 CAB until January 1943, when they were reorganised into the 3rd Canadian Army Tank Brigade along with The Fort Garry Horse and the Sherbrooke Fusilier Regiment. In July 1943, 3 CATB was re-designated the 2nd Canadian Armoured Brigade (2CAB), a designation which remained until the end of the war.

6 CAR continued training in the village of Elstead in southern England before moving to Combined Operations Training Centre in Inverary, Scotland where they prepared for an Amphibious assault. In December 1943, the First Hussars were introduced to "Duplex Drive" (DD for short) tanks. Initially the regiment was trained on the Valentine DD, until it was re-equipped with the M4A4 Sherman DD and Sherman Vc "Firefly" in April 1944.

=== D-Day and Normandy ===
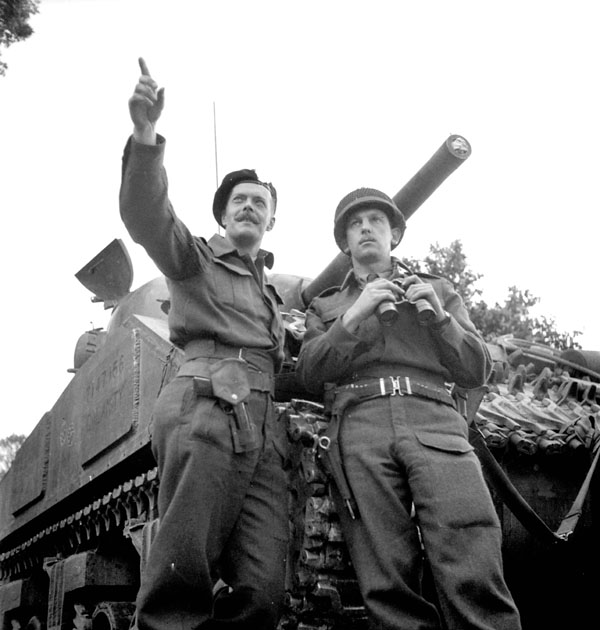
Major A. D'Arcy Marks and Captain Alfred Brandon Conron of the 1st Hussars with a Sherman tank of "C" Squadron, Colomby-sur-Thaon, France, 8 June 1944.

The DD tanks of the 1st Hussars were amongst the allied forces to come ashore in Normandy. The Hussars were to support the infantry landing on the western half of Juno Beach.

At 07:15, 19 tanks of 'B' Squadron launched their Sherman V DDs from their landing-craft into the English Channel some 4000 metres from shore of Nan Green Beach. Of 'B' Squadron's 19 tanks, 15 made it to shore ahead of the Regina Rifles, whom they were tasked to support.

'A' Squadron launched some of their DDs some ten minutes later than 'B' Squadron, from approximately 1500 metres out and headed towards Mike Beach. Only two of the four LTCs carrying 'A' Squadron were able to launch all their tanks off shore. Of 'A' Squadron's 19 tanks, 10 were launched into the channel with seven of those making it to shore. Five tanks were landed directly onto the beach, and four were stranded on a landing craft which struck a mine. The tanks of 'A' Squadron were to support the Winnipeg Rifles, who were already fighting on the beach when they came ashore.

At the beach, many of tanks of the 1st Hussars stayed partially submerged just off shore in a hull down position. After dropping their screens, they began engaging the German antitank guns, machine-gun nests and other strong points, allowing the infantry to break the beach defences and make its way inland. 'A' Squadron made its way inland to the village of Graye-sur-Mer where the Winnipeg Rifles were attempting to capture bridges over the Suelles River. 'B' Squadron helped clear Courseulles-sur-Mer before breaking out into the countryside.

At 08:20, 'C' Squadron's Sherman Vc Fireflies and Sherman IIIs were landed directly onto Mike Red beach, along with the regimental Headquarters Squadron. By this time, resistance at the beach had been cleared.

After clearing Courseulles-sur-Mer, The regiment made its way inland. South of Reviers, 'B' Squadron encountered a German 88 mm gun which knocked out six tanks before being put out of action. Seven Hussar crewmen were killed in the engagement. Due to these losses,'B' squadron was pulled back to the beach after the encounter. As mentioned above, 'A' Squadron moved on to Graye-sur-Mer where the Winnipeg Rifles were fighting to secure the village. 'A' Squadron joined the fight in support of the Winnipegs, along with elements of 'C' squadron who were catching up. After the village was captured, 'C' Squadron pressed on, with 2nd Troop reaching the regiment's objective of the Caen-Bayeux Highway, becoming the only Allied unit to reach its D-Day objective. One survivor of D-Day said that "A German soldier actually saluted us on our way to the objective. I guess he was surprised to see us this far inland" However, 2nd troop had to pull back, as they were too far ahead of the rest of the force and too few to hold the objective. At dusk, the regiment pulled back to the channel to rest. the 1st Hussars suffered 21 killed, 17 wounded during the actions of D-Day. 'A' Squadron was left with 9 tanks at the end of the day and 'B' Squadron was reduced to 4 tanks.

After D-Day, the 1st Hussars continued to support infantry as it advanced and faced German counter-attacks. On 9 June, the Hussars supported the Canadian Scottish as they re-took Putot-en-Bessin and engaged Panther tanks of the 1st Battalion, SS-Panzer Regiment 12 (of the 12th SS Panzer Division Hitlerjugend), destroying 6.

==== Battle of Le Mesnil-Patry ====
On the afternoon of Sunday, 11 June, 'B' Squadron of the 1st Hussars was decimated during an abortive attack with the Queen's Own Rifles of Canada on the hamlet of Le Mesnil Patry, northwest of Caen. Panzergrenadiers, pioneers and tanks of the 12th SS Panzer Division were able to ambush the tanks of 'B' Squadron in part due to intelligence gleaned from the Hussar's own radio traffic after capturing wireless codes from a destroyed Canadian tank on 9 June. Using Panzerfausts, Panzerschrecks and anti-tank guns, the German forces were able destroy 51 Shermans, and inflict 61 killed or missing, 2 wounded and 11 captured on the 1st Hussars. The Queen's Own Rifles suffered 55 killed, 33 wounded and 11 taken prisoner during the attack. The attack is remembered as the "Black Day", "Black Sunday" and the "Black Sabbath" within the regiment. It accounted for roughly one-third of the 1st Hussars' dead over the entire war.

==== Capture of Caen ====
After the disaster at Le Mesnil Patry, the 1st Hussars were taken off the front lines to refit and regroup. After a few weeks of rest and training the Hussars were back in action on 8 July 1944 as part of Operation Charnwood, with the objectives of capturing the village of Cussy and the Ardenne Abbey. 'A' Squadron supported the Canadian Scottish in its attack on Cussy, 'C' squadron was assigned to support the Regina Rifles in their attack on the Abby while 'B' Squadron and the Royal Winnipeg Rifles were held in reserve. When the attack started at 18:30, the Hussars again found themselves opposing the 12th SS, including Panther tanks, anti-tank guns and infantry. 'A' Squadron and the Reginas had to first fight to secure their start line before proceeding to the Abbey. At around 23:45, the Abbey, which had been the headquarters of Kurt 'Panzer' Meyer and the site of the execution of 20 Canadian POWs who were captured a month before, was captured. By 9 July, portions of Caen north and east of the Orne River had been captured.

The 1st Hussars were again in action on 18 July during Goodwood which aimed to capture the portions of Caen South and East of the Orne. The Canadian portion of Goodwood was code-named Operation Atlantic, which aimed to secure a bridgehead over the Orne east of Caen. The Hussar's objectives during Atlantic included the capture of the steelworks at Colombelles on the east bank of the river, the eastern suburbs of Giberville and Faubourg de Vaucelles. By end of 19 July, all the Hussars' objectives were captured and the bridgehead was secure.

As Atlantic wound down, planning for an attack against Verrières Ridge began, known as Operation Spring. As the Canadians pushed south towards the Start Line on 20 July, 'A' Squadron of the 1st Hussars was tasked with supporting the attack on Saint-André-sur-Orne and the Beauvoir and Troteval farms by Les Fusiliers Mont-Royal. Les Fusiliers Mont-Royal initially captured the village and the farms, but were pushed back by the counter-attacks of the 1SS Panzerdivision and 272nd Infantry Division. The Beauvoir and Troteval farms would be retaken later in the evening with the assistance of the Hussars' 'A' Squadron. Sporadic fighting continued for a few days as the lines stabilized below Verrières Ridge. During this time, the Germans reinforced their positions on the ridge under the cover of storms that kept allied attack aircraft grounded.

Operation Spring began on 25 July. 'C' Squadron of the 1st Hussars were to support the Royal Hamilton Light Infantry in their attack against the village of Verrières and then continue to Rocquancourt with the Royal Regiment of Canada. 'B' Sqn was to support the Queen's Own Cameron Highlanders, the Calgary Highlanders and the Black Watch as they attacked the villages of Saint-André-sur-Orne, Saint-Martin-de-Fontenay, May-sur-Orne and Fontenay-le-Marmion. Most of the attacks against the ridge met heavy resistance and were fought to a standstill by the Germans, with only the Village of Verrières being captured and held. The attack cost 'C' Squadron 14 of its 19 tanks and 27 casualties. These losses paled in comparison to those of the Black Watch who lost 310 of the 325 men who left the start line.

== Lineage ==
=== 1st Hussars ===
- Originated on 31 May 1872, in London, Ontario, as the 1st Regiment of Cavalry
- Redesignated on 1 January 1893, as the 1st Hussars
- Redesignated on 11 February 1941, as the 2nd (Reserve) Regiment, 1st Hussars
- Redesignated on 1 April 1941, as the 6th (Reserve) Armoured Regiment, (1st Hussars)
- Redesignated on 4 February 1949, as the 1st Hussars (6th Armoured Regiment)
- Redesignated on 19 May 1958, as the 1st Hussars
- Redesignated on 19 September 1985, as the 1st Hussars (RCAC)
- Redesignated on 14 August 1997, as the 1st Hussars

=== Lineage chart ===
Lineage chart

1856	Independent troops of cavy
1872	1st Regt of Cavy
1893	1st Hussars
1914	A Sqn, 7th Regt, CMR, CEF
1915	2nd Canadian Divisional Cavy Sqn, CEF
1916	B Sqn, Canadian Corps Cavy Regt, CEF
1917	B Sqn, Canadian Light Horse, CEF
1920	Disbanded	1st Regt, 1st Hussars	2nd Regt, (Note: Reserve) 1st Hussars
1936	1st Hussars	Disbanded
1939	1st Hussars, CASF
1940	Disbanded	1st Canadian Cavy Regt (Mechanized), CASF
1940	First Canadian Cavy Regt (Mechanized), CASF
1941	6th Armd Regt (1st Hussars), CASF	2nd (Reserve) Regt, 1st Hussars
1941	6th (Reserve) Armd Regt (1st Hussars)
1943	6th Armd Regt (1st Hussars), CAC, CASF
1945	6th Armd Regt (1st Hussars), RCAC, CASF
1946	Disbanded
1949	1st Hussars (6th Armd Regt)
1958	1st Hussars
1985	1st Hussars (RCAC)
1997	1st Hussars

== Alliances ==
- United Kingdom - The King's Royal Hussars

== Guidon ==
The regiment's original guidon was presented in 1967 by Queen Elizabeth II during a ceremony on Parliament Hill. At the centre of the guidon is the regimental badge depicting the White Horse of Hanover, galloping, with forelegs raised, above a coronet surrounded by the regiment's name "First Hussars". The badge is surrounded by the national wreath of maple leaves, with the regiment's motto, "hodie non cras" below. The first canton of the guidon contains the regiment's abbreviated name "1H". The second and third cantons again contain the White Horse of Hanover, and the fourth canton contains the royal cypher of Queen Elizabeth II "EIIR". The guidon is also emblazoned with 17 of the 34 battle honours awarded to the regiment. The first guidon was retired in 1993, with a new guidon being presented by Henry Jackman, Lieutenant Governor of Ontario, at Wolseley Barracks.

== Battle honours ==
The battle honours awarded to the 1st Hussars are as follows, with those bolded emblazoned on the regiment's guidon.

- **South Africa, 1900**
- Somme, 1916
- Flers-Courcelette
- Ancre Heights
- **Arras, 1917**
- **Vimy, 1917**
- Amiens
- Scarpe, 1918
- Drocourt–Quéant
- **Hindenburg Line**
- Canal du Nord
- **Cambrai, 1918**
- **Pursuit to Mons**
- **France and Flanders, 1915–18**
- **Normandy Landing**
- Putot-en-Bessin
- **Le Mesnil-Patry**
- **Caen**
- The Orne
- Bourguébus Ridge
- **Faubourg de Vaucelles**
- **Verrières Ridge–Tilly-la-Campagne**
- **Falaise**
- Falaise Road
- Quesnay Wood
- The Laison
- Chambois
- **Calais, 1944**
- **The Lower Maas**
- **The Rhineland**
- The Hochwald
- **Apeldoorn**
- Bad Zwischenahn
- North-West Europe, 1944–1945
- Afghanistan

== Notable members ==
First World War flying ace, recipient of the Victoria Cross and Distinguished Flying Cross, William Avery (Billy) Bishop, was a lieutenant in the regiment before transferring to the Royal Flying Corps.

On D-Day, 2 Troop 'C' Sqn commanded by Lieutenant W. F. (Bill) McCormick failed to contact the infantry but kept going, returning an hour and a half later after a 10-mile ramble inland through Bretteville and almost into Carpiquet. By crossing the Caen-Bayeux railway line the troop became somewhat fortuitously "the only unit of the allied invasion forces known to reach its final objective on D-Day."

== Order of precedence ==
Preceded by 12^{e} Régiment blindé du Canada (Milice)	1st Hussars	Succeeded by The Prince Edward Island Regiment (RCAC)

== Gallery ==
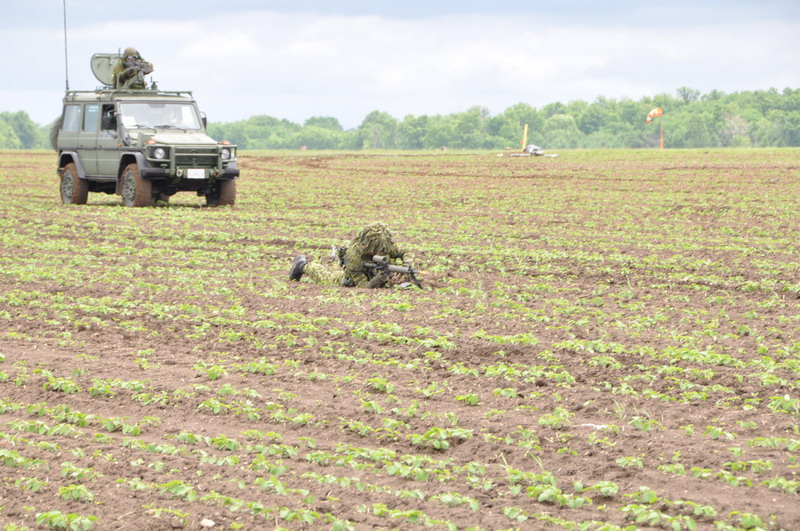
1st Hussars in G-Wagen at St. Thomas Airshow, 2011

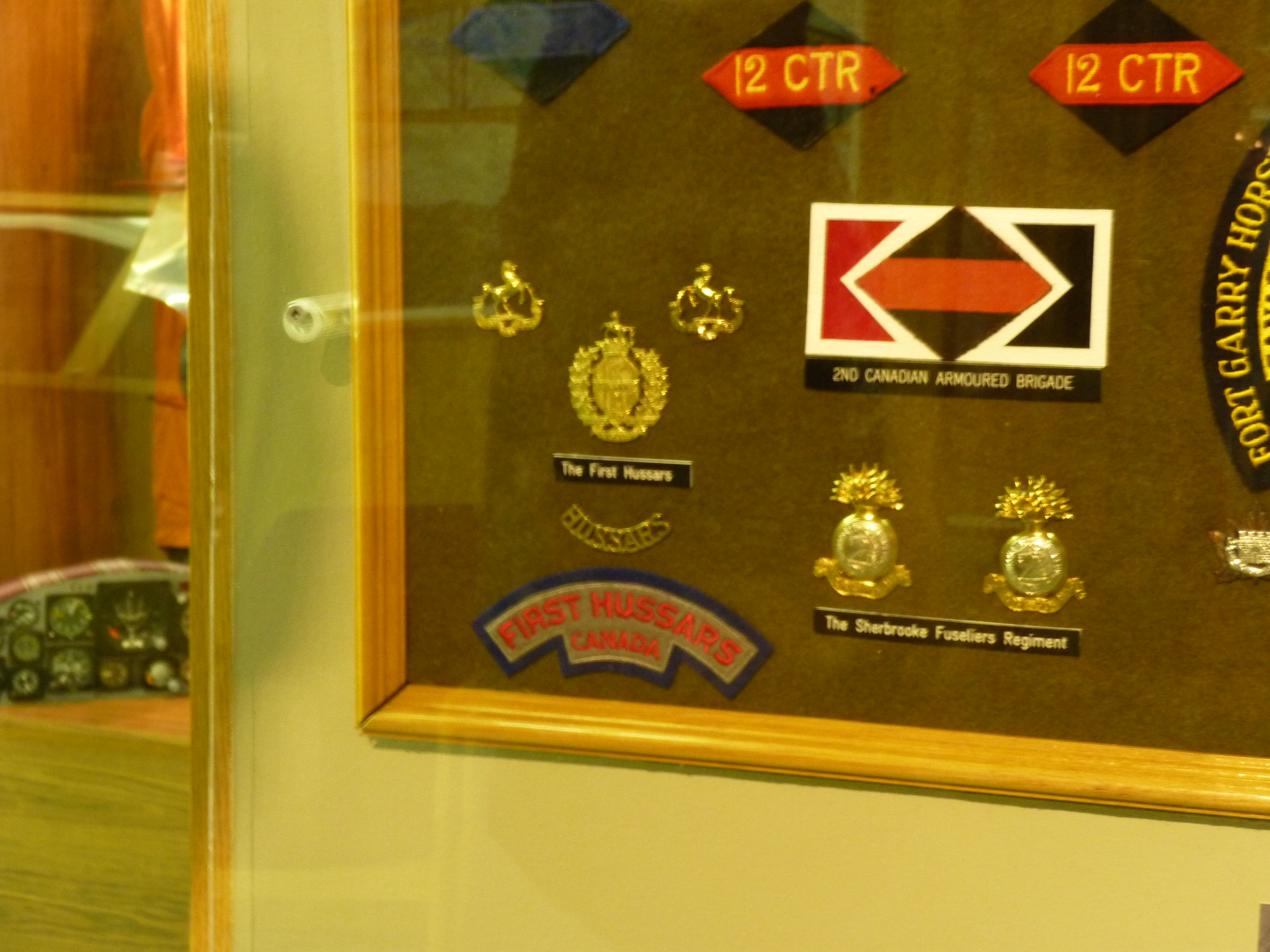
1st Hussars brass badges at Trenton Air Museum

== Appearances in media and popular culture ==
The 2010 docudrama Storming Juno follows a tank crew of the 1st Hussars led by Sergeant Leo Gariepy (played by Philippe Martin) during the initial landings and immediate aftermath.

== See also ==
- List of regiments of cavalry of the Canadian Militia (1900–1920)
- Holy Roller (tank)
