= 43rd Royal Tank Regiment =

- Active: 1938–1956
- Disbanded: 1956
- Country: United Kingdom
- Branch: British Army
- Type: Armoured Regiment
- Role: Specialised Armour
- Part of: Royal Armoured Corps

The 43rd (6th (City) Battalion, The Royal Northumberland Fusiliers) Royal Tank Regiment (43 RTR) was an armoured regiment of the British Army's Royal Armoured Corps that tested and demonstrated specialised Armoured Fighting Vehicles during World War II.

== Origin and training ==
As part of the rearmament of the British Army before World War II, the 6th Battalion Royal Northumberland Fusiliers, a Territorial Army infantry battalion, was converted to the armoured role on 1 November 1938, under the designation 43rd (6th City) Battalion, The Royal Northumberland Fusiliers, Royal Tank Regiment, or '43 RTR' for short. During 1939, it also formed 49th Royal Tank Regiment as a duplicate regiment. The regiments shared St George's Drill Hall in Newcastle upon Tyne as their depot. Both regiments were part of 25th Army Tank Brigade.

At the end of May 1940, with the British Expeditionary Force being evacuated from Dunkirk and the imminent threat of German invasion of England, 25th Army Tank Brigade was redesignated 2nd Motor Machine Gun Brigade and its regiments reorganised accordingly. Each MMG squadron consisted of three troops, each with six Austin Utility ('Tilly') two-seat cars, two carrying medium machine guns, two Bren light machine guns and two Boys anti-tank rifles. In July 1940, volunteers from the units of 25th Army Tank Brigade formed No. 5 Troop of No. 5 Commando at Bridlington.

In November 1940, 43 RTR moved south and was attached to 21st Army Tank Brigade. Although still organised as an MMG battalion, it did begin to receive a few Matilda II tanks and Light Dragons (tracked artillery tractors) for training, later followed by a mixture of Vickers Medium Mark Is and Mk IIs, Matilda Mk IIAs and Vickers Light Mk VIBs. By the end of March 1941, 43 RTR had reached its full establishment of 50 tanks and rejoined 25th Army Tank Brigade, now reconverted from the MMG role to train in the infantry tank role on the South Downs. The battalion's operational assignment was to cooperate with 125 Infantry Brigade, which in turn was converted to a tank brigade later in the year.

In October 1941, 43 RTR was transferred to 33rd Tank Brigade, which was being formed in the Dukeries area of Nottinghamshire to supervise the training of infantry battalions converting to tanks. 43 RTR was stationed at Welbeck Abbey, where it provided training courses for the other battalions in the brigade: 144th and 148th Regiments Royal Armoured Corps. The brigade was equipped with Churchill tanks, replacing 43 RTR's Matildas.

Throughout 1942, training continued, first at Welbeck, later at Berkhamsted. In November 1942, 43 RTR formed a special squadron ('X' Sqn) equipped with modified Churchills, to take part in Exercise Trent II, testing the practicalities of disembarking from Landing Craft Tank LCTs on Pendine Sands on the South Wales coast.

== Specialised armour ==
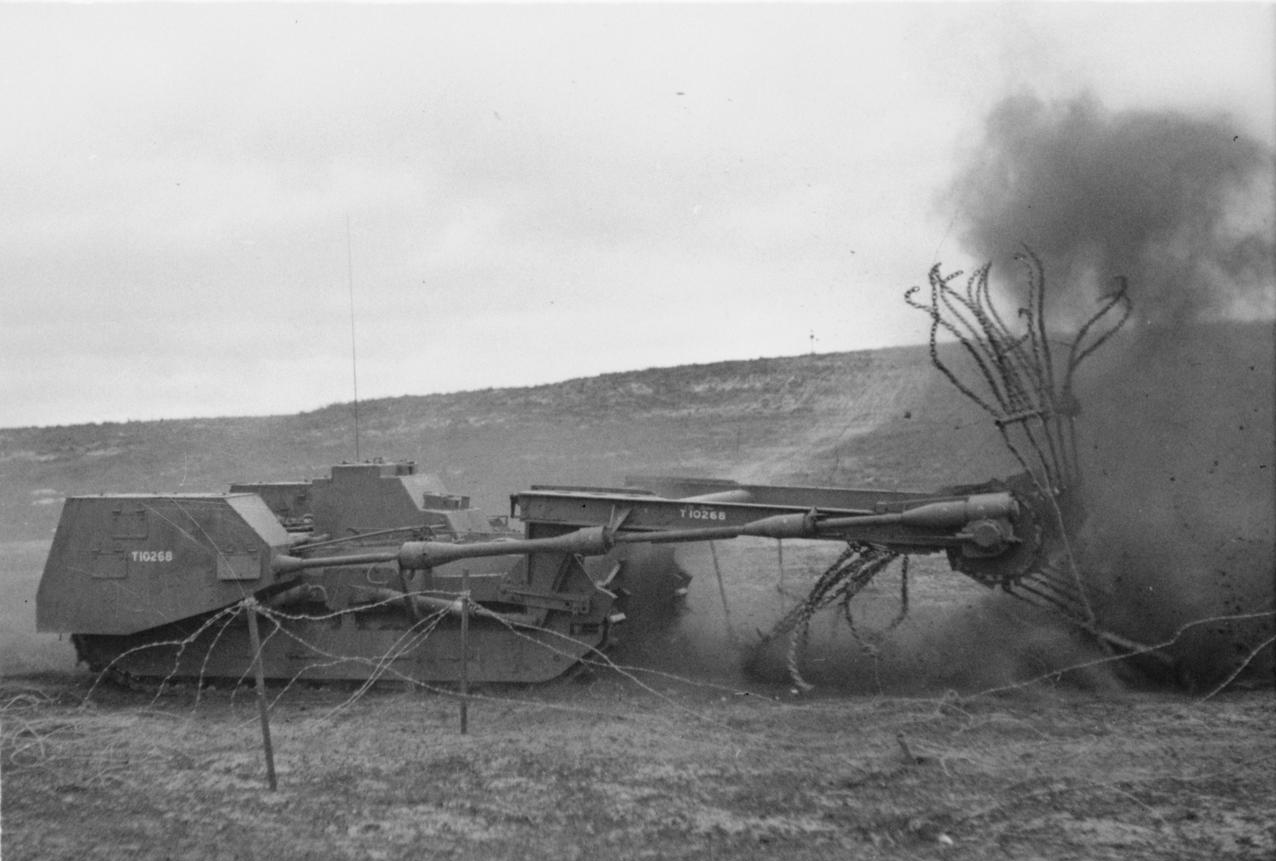
Turretless Matilda Baron under test - 13 August 1943.

In February 1943, 43 RTR was ordered to mobilise for overseas service and received new Churchill tanks. Next, the orders were changed to mobilisation for a tropical climate with Sherman tanks. Then the orders were changed again, and 43 RTR was earmarked for 'very special training' with 79th Armoured Division, which was developing all kinds of specialised armoured vehicles for use in the Normandy Landings. 43 RTR was made responsible for training Armoured Assault Regiments of the Royal Engineers (RE) on Matilda and Valentine tanks. When 33 Tank Bde moved to Scotland, 43 RTR remained behind at the Orford Battle Range directly under 79 Division HQ as a trials and demonstration unit, with A Sqn experimenting with Wasps (Universal Carriers equipped with flamethrowers), B Sqn with Matilda Barons (turretless tanks equipped with mine flails), and C Sqn with Valentines. More advanced vehicles arrived as time went on: Churchill Crocodile flamethrowers; Valentine Scorpion and Sherman Crab flail tanks; Canal Defence Lights; Snake Mine-clearing line charges etc. By the end of 1943, the joint RE/RAC assault training wing disappeared, and 43 RTR was organised as a 'breaching team', to demonstrate using all these specialised vehicles in tactical combination.

However, all this experimental and demonstration work meant that 43 RTR did not go to Normandy with the rest of 79 Armoured in June 1944. Instead, it was transferred to 35th Tank Brigade, a training brigade under GHQ Home Forces, providing reinforcements to 21st Army Group. 43 RTR was placed on a lower establishment and given the role of collective training for recruits and rehabilitation training for returning wounded.

== To India ==
In January 1945, 43 RTR was told that it was to re-train in the Canal Defence Light (CDL) role for deployment to South East Asia Command. CDLs were tanks equipped with powerful searchlights and the crews were trained in night fighting. In the early part of 1945, the regiment was stationed at Lowther Castle, near Penrith, the CDL training centre. It sailed for India on 10 July, arriving at Bombay Docks on 1 August.

However, news of the Japanese surrender arrived while the regiment was settling into camp at Bolarum, before its Grant CDL tanks had arrived from the docks. As a result, 43 RTR never saw active service.

== Postwar ==
After the end of World War II, 43 RTR remained a Territorial Army unit of the Royal Tank Regiment, based at Newcastle, until 1956 when it converted back to infantry under its old designation of 6th Bn Royal Northumberland Fusiliers. In 1951 the regiment formed a band, which continues in the modern-era as the Band of the Royal Regiment of Fusiliers.
