= List of Royal Northumberland Fusiliers battalions in World War II =

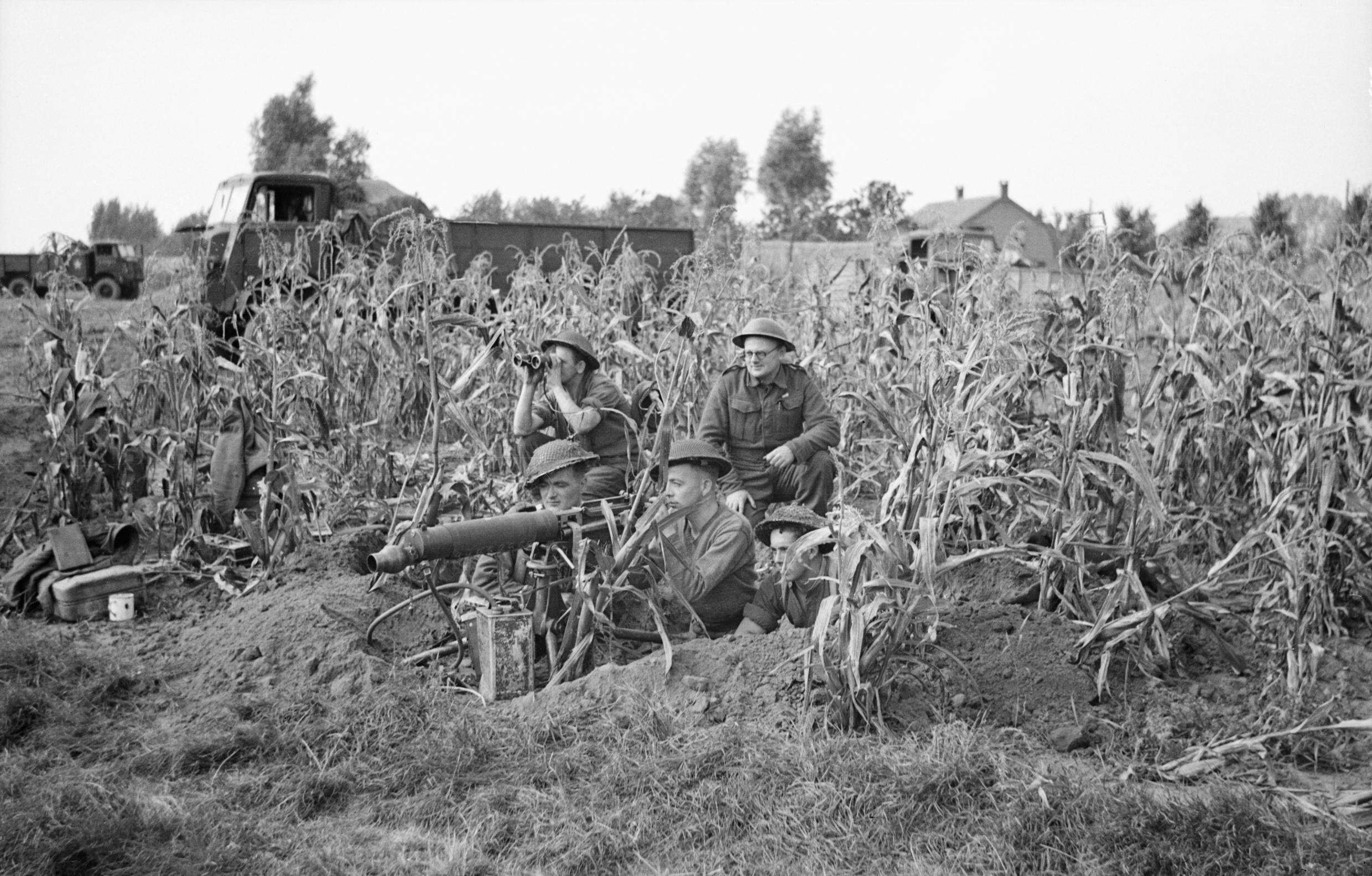
A Vickers machine gun team of the 7th Battalion, Royal Northumberland Fusiliers in position in a field of corn at Someren, the Netherlands, 21 September 1944.

This is a list of Royal Northumberland Fusiliers battalions in World War II. At the outbreak of the Second World War in September 1939 the Royal Northumberland Fusiliers, a fusilier infantry regiment of the British Army, consisted of seven battalions. A further three were raised during the war. Prior to the war, the regiment was one of a number that been selected to transition from an infantry role to a support role and be equipped with the Vickers machine gun. While most battalions served as divisional machine gun (Note: Divisional machine gun battalions were originally organized into four companies, each of three platoons of four Vickers machine guns (Twelve machine guns per company, for a total of 48 per battalion). From 1943, one company was re-equipped as a mortar company (Sixteen 4.2 inch mortars in four platoons).) or support (Note: Divisional support battalions had a more brigade-centric organization: three groups (one per divisional brigade) each with a machine gun company (three platoons of four Vickers each), an Anti-Aircraft company (four platoons of four 20mm 20 mm Polsten or Hispano-Suiza0 light AA guns each) and a mortar company (two platoons of four 4.2 inch mortars each).) battalions, several undertook different roles: motorcycle, searchlight, tank, reconnaissance, regular infantry, and deception units. The regiment saw action with the British Expeditionary Force (BEF) during the Battle of France and Dunkirk, defended the United Kingdom, fought in the North African Campaign, took part in the Battle of Singapore, fought in the Italian Campaign, and operated with the 21st Army Group in the North-West Europe Campaign of 1944–45, operating on the Western Front.

== Inter-war years ==
In November 1919, following the end of the First World War, the war-raised battalions of the Northumberland Fusiliers were disbanded. The single exception was the 3rd (Special Reserve) Battalion. While its personal were transferred to the Regular Army 1st Battalion on 12 July 1919 disembodied on 29 July, it was not formally disbanded until April 1953. (Note: The battalion was redesignated as the 3rd (Militia) Battalion in 1921. It continued to exist between 1919 and 1953 in "suspended animation" – without any personnel assigned.)

On 7 February 1920, following the establishment of the Territorial Army (T.A.), the 1st Line Territorial Force battalions of the regiment were reconstituted. The battalions were grouped together, to once again form the Northumberland Brigade, which was part of the Northumbrian Division. During the interwar period, the make-up of the regiment was as follows:

- 1st Battalion
- 2nd Battalion
- 3rd Battalion (Militia) suspended animation
- 4th Battalion (T.A.)
- 5th Battalion (T.A.)
- 6th Battalion (T.A.)
- 7th Battalion (T.A.)

In June 1935, as part of H.M. King George V's silver jubilee, the regiment was accorded royal status in recognition for their service during the First World War. They would henceforth be known as the Royal Northumberland Fusiliers. (Note: Three other regiments were granted royal status at the same time: the 5th Royal Inniskilling Dragoon Guards, the Buffs (Royal East Kent Regiment) and the Royal Norfolk Regiment.)

In 1922, the Machine Gun Corps (MGC) was disbanded in order to save money. Following which, Vickers machine guns were organised into Machine Gun Platoons (later, Machine Gun Companies) in each infantry battalion. In 1936, this decision was reversed and the heavy machine guns were, once again, to be concentrated in specialised Divisional (Machine Gun) or Divisional (Support) Battalions. Rather than resurrecting the MGC, a number of infantry regiments were converted to take on the role. The Royal Northumberland Fusiliers was one of four regiments selected for conversion. (Note: The other three regiments were the Cheshire Regiment, the Middlesex Regiment, and the Manchester Regiment.)

The needs of modern mechanized warfare had a significant effect on the regiment's T.A. battalions. The Northumbrian Division was reorganized as a Motor Division, which saw a reduction from three to two brigades (but the addition of a motorcycle battalion) and the Northumberland Brigade was broken up. On 1 November 1938, the role of several battalions were changed. The 4th Battalion was converted to a motorcycle battalion, and assigned to 50th Division The 5th Battalion became a searchlight battalion, styled as 5th Battalion, The Royal Northumberland Fusiliers (53rd Searchlight Regiment), and assigned to the 30th (Northumbrian) Anti-Aircraft Brigade. The 6th Battalion was converted to an armoured role and transferred to the Royal Tank Corps as its 43rd Battalion (6th (City) Battalion, The Royal Northumberland Fusiliers). (Note: 43rd Royal Tank Regiment(43 RTR) formed a duplicate – 49th Royal Tank Regiment (49 RTR) – in 1939 and both were assigned to 25th Army Tank Brigade at the outbreak of war. For most of the war, they tested, demonstrated, and operated specialised Armoured Fighting Vehicles – "Hobart's Funnies". 49 RTR later became the 49th Armoured Personnel Carrier Regiment. The battalion was absorbed back into the regiment at the end of the war. 43 RTR rejoined the regiment on 1 November 1956, when it converted back to infantry under its original designation of the 6th (City) Battalion, Royal Northumberland Fusiliers.) The 7th Battalion was converted to a machine gun battalion in Northumbrian Area, Northern Command

By 1939, it became clear that a new major war was likely to break out. The War Office ordered the doubling of the T.A., with each unit forming a duplicate. The 4th and 7th Battalions formed duplicates: the 8th and 9th Battalions. On the eve of the Second World War, the Royal Northumberland Fusiliers consisted of:

- 1st Battalion (MG)
- 2nd Battalion (MG)
- 4th Battalion (T.A.) (motorcycle)
- 5th Battalion (T.A.) (53rd Searchlight Regiment)
- 7th Battalion (T.A.) (MG)
- 8th Battalion (T.A.) (motorcycle)
- 9th Battalion (T.A.) (MG)

== Second World War ==
=== 1st Battalion ===
At the outbreak of the Second World War, the 1st Battalion was a machine gun unit assigned to the 18th Infantry Brigade as part of the British Troops in Egypt. It was stationed at Abbassia, Cairo but was just leaving for Mersa Matruh in the Western Desert. By the end of the month, it was attached to the 7th Infantry Division and was still attached when the division was designated as 6th Infantry Division on 3 November 1939; the battalion remained with it until April 1940.

From April to December 1940, the battalion was attached to the 4th Indian Infantry Division and served in Operation Compass which saw the Italians expelled from Egypt and the capture of Sidi Barrani. Thereafter, the division departed for East Africa without the battalion. From January 1941, it was assigned to XIII Corps and from August to December 1941 it was in Tobruk Fortress. It then came under the command of the Eighth Army until the end of the North African Campaign. Its most notable action was in the Battle of El Alamein when it operated as separate companies among the units of I Corps:

- HQ attached to 8th Armoured Division
- W Company attached to 131st Lorried Infantry Brigade, 10th Armoured Division
- X Company attached to 2nd Armoured Brigade, 1st Armoured Division
- Y Company reforming
- Z Company attached to "Hammerforce", 1st Armoured Division

On 19 September 1943, the battalion moved to Syria where it joined the 10th Indian Infantry Division and remained with it for the rest of the war. (Note: 1st Battalion was attached to the division's 20th Indian Infantry Brigade for training on Cyprus, 30 October to 19 November 1943.) In March 1944, the battalion transited Palestine and Egypt and shipped to Italy, landing at Taranto on 28 March; it remained on the Italian Front for the rest of the Second World War. The battalion saw action on the Gothic Line and in the 1945 Spring offensive. During the war Captain James Jackman was posthumously awarded the Victoria Cross.

=== 2nd Battalion ===
At the outbreak of the war, the 2nd Battalion, Royal Northumberland Fusiliers was stationed in Dover, Kent, and attached as the machine gun unit to the Colchester based 4th Infantry Division. It joined the British Expeditionary Force (BEF) in France in October 1939 and served there until June 1940. Although organized as a divisional machine gun battalion, it was attached to General Headquarters (GHQ) and was assigned to divisions as required.

It joined Home Forces on its return from Dunkirk and on 11 November 1941 it rejoined the 4th Division as its machine gun battalion until 20 May 1942 when it was posted back to Home Forces. On 3 July 1943, it joined the 46th Infantry Division in North Africa as a support battalion. It moved to Italy with the division taking part in the Salerno landings, capture of Naples, Volturno Crossing and Mont Camino. On 10 March 1944, it left the 46th Division and once again joined the 4th Division. It was reconfigured as a machine gun battalion on 7 June 1944 and remained with the division for the rest of the war. It fought at Cassino II, Trasimene Line, Arezzo, Advance to Florence and Rimini Line. In December 1944, it moved with the division to Greece where it remained until the end of the war.

=== 4th Battalion ===
The 4th Battalion was converted to a motorcycle battalion in 1938, and was assigned to the 50th (Northumbrian) Infantry Division (then organised as a Motor Division) on the outbreak of the war. It served with the division in France and Belgium from January to June 1940. It took part in the action on the Ypres-Comines Canal.

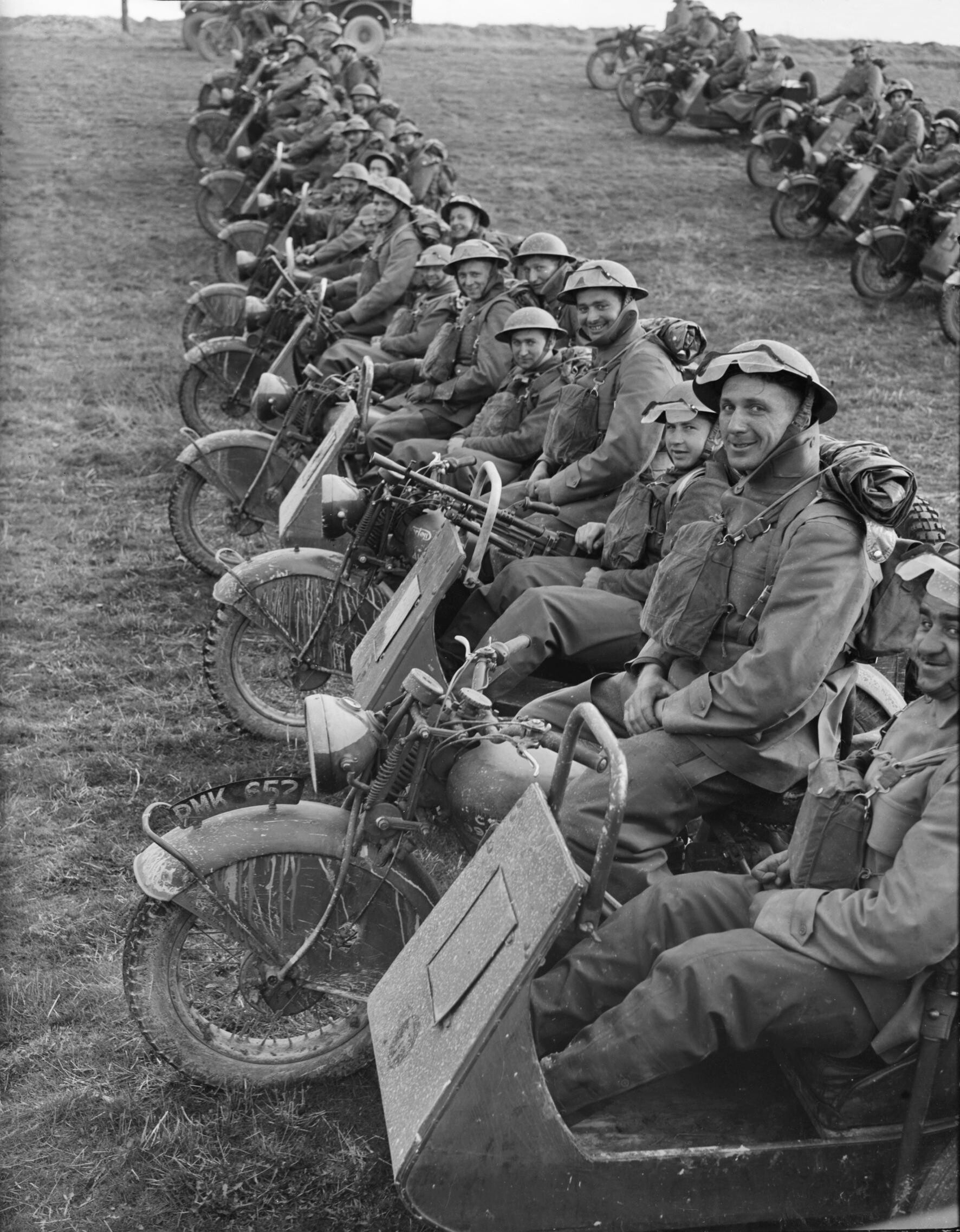
Motorcycle combinations of the 4th Battalion, Royal Northumberland Fusiliers in the Nord department, France, 20 March 1940.

After returning from Dunkirk, the battalion came under command of Home Forces until April 1941; on 30 April 1941 it was transferred to the Reconnaissance Corps and redesignated as 50th Battalion, Reconnaissance Corps, and it rejoined 50th Division. It was then sent to North Africa with the division in June 1941, with a short stay in Cyprus from July to November 1941 and in Iraq from November to December 1941. Much of the time, 50 Recce was attached to the 150th Infantry Brigade in keeping with the then current tactical organisation of brigade groups in the British Army in the Mediterranean and Middle East. From February to June 1942 it was assigned to the 22nd Armoured Brigade.

In June 1942, it returned to the United Kingdom and was in the Home Forces once again. On 6 June 1942 it became 50th Regiment, Reconnaissance Corps and in March 1943 reverted to the Royal Northumberland Fusiliers as the 4th Battalion. On 25 April 1944, the battalion was suspended; its personnel formed three independent machine gun companies for the British armoured divisions of the 21st Army Group:

- 1st Independent Machine Gun Company assigned to the Guards Armoured Division
- 2nd Independent Machine Gun Company assigned to the 11th Armoured Division
- 3rd Independent Machine Gun Company assigned to the 7th Armoured Division

All three served throughout the North-West Europe Campaign. They variously saw action at Odon, Bourguébus Ridge, Mont Pinçon, The Nederrijn, The Rhineland, and The Rhine.

=== 5th Battalion (53rd Searchlight Regiment) ===
Note: Although the 5th Battalion spent most of the war as part of the Royal Artillery, its record is included here for completeness.

The 5th Battalion was converted to a searchlight battalion on 1 November 1938 as 5th Battalion, The Royal Northumberland Fusiliers (53rd Searchlight Regiment). At the outbreak of the war, it was assigned to 30th (Northumbrian) Anti-Aircraft Brigade, 7th Anti-Aircraft Division as part of the anti-aircraft defences for the North East. On 1 August 1940, it was transferred to the Royal Artillery as the 53rd (Royal Northumberland Fusiliers) Searchlight Regiment, Royal Artillery and transferred to 57th Anti-Aircraft Brigade. It remained as a searchlight regiment in the UK until January 1945.

In January 1945, the diminishing threat of the Luftwaffe coupled with a manpower shortage in 21st Army Group, particularly in the infantry, led to the conversion of surplus anti-aircraft and coastal artillery regiments in the UK into infantry units. 53rd Searchlight Regiment was one of the regiments selected but it did not revert to its original title, instead becoming 638th (Royal Northumberland Fusiliers) Regiment, Royal Artillery on 23 January 1945. It joined 304th Infantry Brigade, initially in the UK but in Norway from June 1945. It was placed in suspended animation in Norway on 13 December 1945.

=== 7th Battalion ===
At the outbreak of the war, the 7th Battalion was organized as a machine gun battalion in Northumbrian Area, Northern Command. The battalion joined the British Expeditionary Force (BEF) in France in October 1939. It was assigned to III Corps and attached to the 51st (Highland) Infantry Division, which had been stationed at the Maginot Line, and escaped being encircled with the rest of the BEF during the Battle of Dunkirk. It was then pulled back to the west of Northern France, where it was attached to the French Tenth Army. For some time, the 51st was forced to hold a line four times longer than that which would normally be expected of a division. During this period, the 154th Infantry Brigade was detached and withdrawn successfully. However, the 152nd and 153rd Infantry Brigades were trapped at Saint-Valery-en-Caux, and surrendered on 12 June.

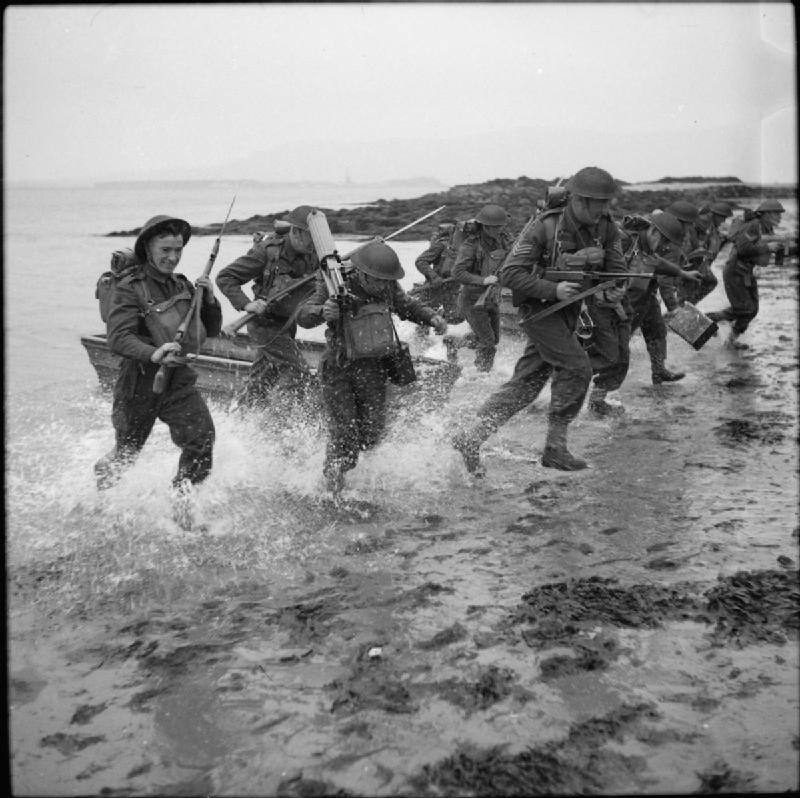
Men of the 7th Battalion, Royal Northumberland Fusiliers charge ashore during invasion exercises at Greencastle, County Down in Northern Ireland, 8 May 1942.

The battalion was reconstituted in the United Kingdom, and on 12 October 1940 was assigned to 206th Independent Infantry Brigade (Home) until 17 December. On 18 November 1941, the battalion was assigned to the 59th (Staffordshire) Infantry Division. It remained in the United Kingdom training and preparing for the opening of the Western Front. The battalion landed in Normandy with the division on 27 June 1944, and fought with it in the Battle for Caen and Mont Pinçon. Due to a severe manpower shortage in the British Army, the 59th Division was disbanded on 19 October 1944 and the battalion was placed in suspended animation.

=== 8th Battalion ===
The 8th Battalion was formed as a duplicate of the 4th Battalion on 18 June 1939 (first officer commissioned) organized as a motorcycle battalion. On 2 October 1939 it was assigned to the 23rd (Northumbrian) Division. (Note: Between 3 September and 2 October 1939, the units of the 23rd Division were administered by the 50th Division.) The division was sent to France on 22 April 1940, on labour and training duties, without any of its artillery or the bulk of its signals and administration units. On 20 May 1940, the division suffered heavy casualties trying to delay the German advance at Arras and had to be evacuated at Dunkirk. On its return to the UK, after Dunkirk, the 23rd Division was disbanded due to the heavy losses it had suffered.

After Dunkirk, the battalion left the 23rd Division on 29 June 1940. It was under command of Home Forces until November 1940 when it joined the 3rd Infantry Division, a Regular unit, as a motorcycle battalion. On 30 April 1941 it was transferred to the Reconnaissance Corps and redesignated as 3rd Battalion, Reconnaissance Corps, on 6 June 1942 as 3rd Regiment, Reconnaissance Corps and finally on 1 January 1944 it was transferred to the Royal Armoured Corps as 3rd (Royal Northumberland Fusiliers) Reconnaissance Regiment. It remained part of the 3rd Infantry Division until August 1945.

The 3rd Infantry Division remained in the UK training for many years until it landed on Sword Beach on 6 June 1944 – D-Day – and fought through the Battle of Normandy (Caen, Bourguébus Ridge, Mont Pinçon), the Netherlands (The Nederrijn) and later the invasion of Germany the (Rhineland and the Rhine), ending the war in Bremen. It was placed in suspended animation in July 1946.

=== 9th Battalion ===
The 9th Battalion was formed as a duplicate of the 7th Battalion on 27 July 1939 (first officer commissioned). It was organized as a machine gun battalion and on the outbreak of the war was in Northumbrian Area, Northern Command On 2 October 1939 it was attached to the 23rd Northumbrian Division (under command for labour duties and training, though not a Divisional Unit) and proceeded to France with them in April 1940.

After Dunkirk, the battalion left the 23rd Division on 29 June as the division was disbanded. It was under command of Lieutenant Colonel Lechmere Thomas as part of Home Forces until January 1942 when it was transferred to Malaya Command, landing at Singapore a few days before the fall of the island . It went into Japanese POW camps after the brief but violent week-long Battle of Singapore.

=== 10th (Home Defence), 1/10th (Home Defence), 30th Battalion ===
The 10th (Home Defence) Battalion was formed in December 1939 by the redesignation of No. 40 Group, National Defence Companies (formed in September 1936). On 25 September 1940, it was split to form 1/10th (Home Defence) Battalion and 2/10th (Home Defence) Battalion. Both battalions were redesignated on 24 November as 10th (Home Defence) Battalion and 11th (Home Defence) Battalion. The 10th Battalion absorbed the 11th Battalion on 23 June 1941.

On 24 December 1941, the battalion was converted to normal infantry and redesignated, once again, as 30th Battalion. In August 1943, it moved to North Africa where it joined 42nd Infantry Brigade. The brigade was redesignated 57th Division as a deception, and the 30th Battalion became "170th Brigade" until 30 April 1944. (Note: 170th Brigade had been a constituent formation of the 57th Division in World War I.) On 14 May 1944, it was posted to 233rd Brigade on Malta where it remained until the end of the war. It was disbanded on Malta in 1945.

=== 2/10th (Home Defence), 11th (Home Defence) Battalion ===
The 2/10th (Home Defence) Battalion was formed on 25 September 1940 with personnel drawn from the 10th (Home Defence) Battalion. On 24 November, it was redesignated the 11th (Home Defence) Battalion and it was absorbed back into the 10th (Home Defence) Battalion on 23 June 1941.

=== 70th (Young Soldier) Battalion ===
The 70th (Young Soldier) Battalion was formed at Newcastle on 19 September 1940 by withdrawing the Young Soldier companies of the 30th Battalion, the 30th Battalion of the Green Howards, and the 30th Battalion of the Durham Light Infantry. On 12 November 1942 it was redesignated as No. 98 Primary Training Centre.

== Post-war ==
The withdrawal from Empire, in particular the independence of India, led to a sharp reduction in the number of battalions in the regular army. In common with all the other regiments of the British Army, the Royal Northumberland Fusiliers were reduced to a single battalion; the 1st Battalion was reduced to cadre at Gibraltar and the 2nd Battalion was renumbered on 1 August 1948 as the 1st Battalion.

The battalions of the Territorial Army were reconstituted on 1 January 1947:

- 4th Battalion was reconstituted as infantry
- 638th Regiment, Royal Artillery was reformed as 588th Light Anti-aircraft Regiment, Royal Artillery. On 1 September 1950 it was converted to infantry under its original title (5th Battalion) and simultaneously absorbed into the 4th Battalion
- 43rd Royal Tank Regiment was reconstituted as an armoured regiment. On 1 November 1956 it converted to infantry with its former title (6th (City) Battalion)
- 7th Battalion was reconstituted as infantry and immediately absorbed its war-time duplicate, 9th Battalion
- 3rd Reconnaissance Regiment was converted to infantry with its former title (8th Battalion) and immediately disbanded
- 9th Battalion was reformed and concurrently absorbed into its parent 7th Battalion

== See also ==
- 43rd Royal Tank Regiment – 6th Battalion transferred before the outbreak of the war
- 49th Royal Tank Regiment – duplicate of 43 RTR
- List of Northumberland Fusiliers battalions in World War I

== Bibliography ==
- Becke, Major A.F. (1937). Order of Battle of Divisions Part 2B. The 2nd-Line Territorial Force Divisions (57th–69th) with The Home-Service Divisions (71st–73rd) and 74th and 75th Divisions. London: His Majesty's Stationery Office. ISBN 1-871167-00-0.
- Bellis, Malcolm A. (1994). Regiments of the British Army 1939–1945 (Armour & Infantry). London: Military Press International. ISBN 0-85420-999-9.
- Bellis, Malcolm A. (1995). Regiments of the British Army 1939–1945 (Artillery). London: Military Press International. ISBN 0-85420-110-6.
- Forty, George (1998). British Army Handbook 1939–1945. Stroud, Gloucestershire: Sutton Publishing Limited. ISBN 0-7509-1403-3.
- Frederick, J.B.M. (1984). Lineage Book of British Land Forces 1660–1978. Wakefield, Yorkshire: Microform Academic Publishers. ISBN 1-85117-009-X.
- Joslen, Lt-Col H.F. (1990) [1st. Pub. HMSO:1960]. Orders of Battle, Second World War, 1939–1945. London: London Stamp Exchange. ISBN 0-948130-03-2.
- Kempton, Chris (2003a). 'Loyalty & Honour', The Indian Army September 1939 – August 1947. Vol. Part I Divisions. Milton Keynes: The Military Press. ISBN 0-85420-228-5.
- Kempton, Chris (2003b). 'Loyalty & Honour', The Indian Army September 1939 – August 1947. Vol. Part II Brigades. Milton Keynes: The Military Press. ISBN 0-85420-238-2.
- Kempton, Chris (2003c). 'Loyalty & Honour', The Indian Army September 1939 – August 1947. Vol. Part III. Milton Keynes: The Military Press. ISBN 0-85420-248-X.
- Westlake, Ray (1986). The Territorial Battalions, A Pictorial History, 1859–1985. Tunbridge Wells: Spellmount.
