= 33rd Tank Brigade (United Kingdom) =

Armoured brigade of the British Army from 1941 to 1944

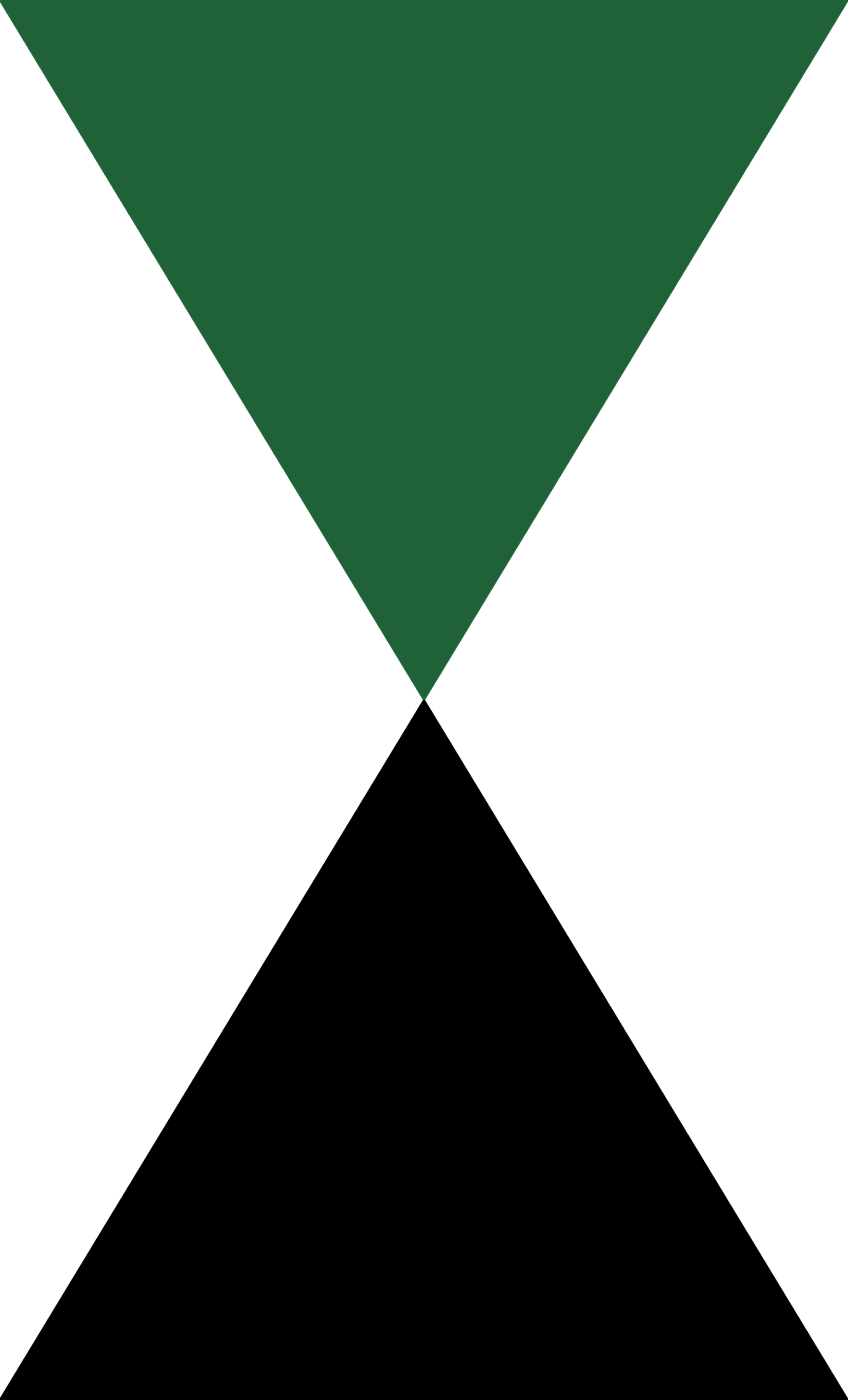
- Formation Insignia of the 33rd Tank Brigade
- Active: 30 August 1941 – 17 March 1944
- Country: United Kingdom
- Branch: British Army
- Type: Armoured
- Role: Infantry Tank
- Size: Brigade
- Part of: Independent Brigade; 3rd Division

The 33rd Army Tank Brigade (later 33rd Tank Brigade) was an armoured brigade formation of the British Army raised during the Second World War.

== Origin ==
33rd Army Tank Brigade was created on 30 August 1941 under GHQ Home Forces to supervise the training of infantry battalions converted to the armour role. On 15 October, Brigade HQ was completed to full establishment and it became an active brigade in Eastern Command and later I Corps. Its initial composition was one Territorial Army tank battalion and two converted infantry battalions of the Royal Armoured Corps. It was based in the "Dukeries" area of Nottinghamshire, the 43 RTR at Welbeck Abbey, 144 RAC at Rufford Abbey and 148 RAC at Thoresby Hall.

== Service ==
On 22 June 1942, the brigade dropped 'Army' from its title and became the tank brigade in 3rd Infantry Division, which had reorganised as a 'mixed' division. However, in April 1943, 3rd Division reverted to being an infantry division and, on 4 May 1943, 33rd Tank Brigade became an independent formation again.

The brigade's regiments had trained in the Infantry Tank role, latterly on Churchill tanks, but in the spring of 1944 converted to Sherman and Sherman Firefly medium tanks. Reflecting this changed role, 33rd Tank Brigade was redesignated 33rd Armoured Brigade on 17 March 1944.

== Units ==
The following units served in 33rd Tank Brigade:

- 43rd Royal Tank Regiment 18 October 1941 – 5 August 1943
- 144th Regiment Royal Armoured Corps 22 November 1941 – 16 March 1944
- 148th Regiment Royal Armoured Corps 22 November 1941 – 8 October 1943, 17 February – 16 March 1944
- 1st Northamptonshire Yeomanry 21 September 1943 – 16 March 1944
- 1st East Riding Yeomanry 8 October 1943 – 17 February 1944

== Commanders ==
The following officers commanded 33rd Tank Brigade:

- Brigadier R.M. Jerram from 30 August 1941
- Brigadier C.H. Montague from 22 December 1942
- Brigadier H.B. Scott from 7 March 1944

== See also ==
- British Armoured formations of World War II
- List of British brigades of the Second World War

== Bibliography ==
- A. Jolly, The Battle of Noyers 16–18 July 1944, Appendix to 144 RAC War Diary July 1944 The National Archives, Kew, file WO 171/878.
- Joslen, H. F. (2003) [1960]. Orders of Battle: Second World War, 1939–1945. Uckfield, East Sussex: Naval and Military Press. ISBN 978-1-84342-474-1.
