= 148th Regiment Royal Armoured Corps =

9th Bn Loyal Regiment (North Lancashire) 148th Regiment Royal Armoured Corps
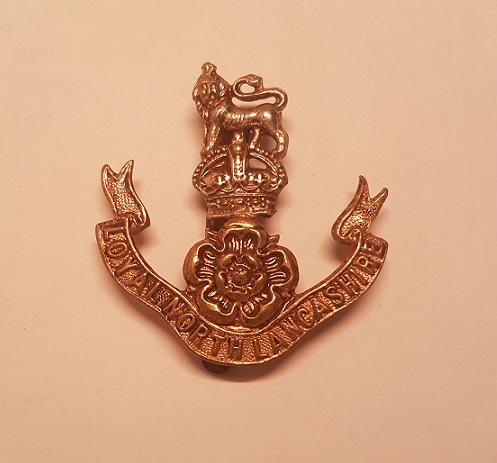
- Cap badge of the Loyal Regiment (North Lancashire)
- Active: 4 July 1940–21 November 1941 (9th Loyals); 22 November 1941–27 August 1944 (148 RAC)
- Disbanded: 27 August 1944
- Country: United Kingdom
- Branch: British Army
- Type: Armoured
- Role: Infantry Support
- Size: Regiment
- Part of: Royal Armoured Corps
- Engagements: World War II

The 148th Regiment Royal Armoured Corps (148 RAC) was an armoured regiment of the British Army's Royal Armoured Corps during World War II. It fought in the invasion of Normandy in 1944.

== Origin ==
148th Regiment RAC was formed in November 1941 by the conversion to the armoured role of the 9th Battalion, Loyal Regiment (North Lancashire), a war service battalion hat had been raised in 1940 as part of the rapid wartime expansion of the British Army.

=== 9th Loyals ===
The 9th Bn Loyals was formed on 4 July 1940 at Lancaster, Lancashire, as a new unit. (A previous 9th (Service) Bn, Loyals, had been raised for 'Kitchener's Army' during World War I).

The battalion assembled in camp at Caernarfon, joining the newly raised 7th and 8th Battalions of the Loyals which (together with 12th Battalion Royal Welch Fusiliers) constituted No 15 Infantry Training Group. In October 1940 the 15th ITG became 215th Independent Infantry Brigade (Home), a home defence formation. Training was hampered by the shortage of rifles and equipment, and the tented camp became uninhabitable during winter gales, with the battalions having to go into billets.

In February the brigade transferred to the Durham and North Riding County Division in North East England, where it took up an operational role in beach defence. All the brigade's infantry battalions left in November and December 1941 for conversion to other roles in the Royal Artillery (RA) or Royal Armoured Corps.

=== 148th RAC ===
9th Loyals was converted into an armoured regiment at Thoresby Hall, Nottinghamshire, on 22 November 1941. Surplus personnel were transferred to other battalions of the Loyals or to 148th Independent Reconnaissance Squadron. In common with other infantry battalions transferred to the Royal Armoured Corps, the personnel of 148 RAC would have continued to wear their Loyals cap badge on the black beret of the Royal Armoured Corps.

148 RAC was assigned to 33rd Tank Brigade (later 33rd Armoured Brigade) for training in the United Kingdom, and remained with this formation for most of its service. Serving in the brigade were 144 RAC and 1st Northamptonshire Yeomanry.

== Equipment and training ==
148 RAC was initially equipped with Churchill I and II infantry tanks. These early models were later replaced by Churchill IIIs, IVs and Vs equipped with 6-pounder guns and 95mm howitzers, but in March 1944 the regiment exchanged these in turn for Sherman I and Sherman Vc Firefly medium tanks. At the same time 33rd Tank Brigade was redesignated 33rd Armoured Brigade, reflecting the re-equipment of its regiments. The M10 Achilles was used for training teenagers.

In fact, although equipped with medium rather than infantry tanks, the brigade's role did not change. As an independent brigade under GHQ, 33rd Armoured could be assigned to support any infantry division that required the assistance of tanks, the regiments forming brigade groups with the infantry, with squadrons assigned to support individual battalions.

== Normandy 1944 ==
148 RAC landed in Normandy on 15 June 1944 (D+9). 33rd Armoured Brigade had been delayed in arrival, and its absence was sorely felt by the British Second Army during the tough fighting around Villers-Bocage (13–16 June). Once in Normandy, the brigade moved between various Divisional, Corps and Army commands as required, but usually it operated with 51st (Highland) Infantry Division.

On 10–11 July 1944, 148 RAC supported 153 Brigade of 51st (Highland) Division in Operation Stack, an attack on the Colombelles factory area of Caen, 'but it was much stronger than expected, and the attack failed miserably'. Two troops of 'A' Squadron in close support of the 5th Battalion, Black Watch found themselves engaged by Panzer IV and Tiger I tanks, and although one Sherman scored six hits on a Tiger and stopped it firing, 9 out of the 10 Shermans were knocked out. For Operation Goodwood (18 July) and Operation Totalize (8 August), 148 RAC again supported 51st (Highland) Division. During Totalize, 'B' Sqn attacked the village of Tilly la Campagne, which was 'browned' with the tanks' Browning machine guns. This induced many members of 1055 Grenadier Regiment to surrender. 'B' squadron knocked out three assault guns for the loss of one Sherman, and 'C' Squadron brewed up two Panther tanks for no loss.

Apart from battle casualties, there was a steady trickle of casualties from German shellfire and mortars, and misdirected Allied bombs. On 13 August, the regiment was shelled while relieving 144 RAC, and the commander of 'B' Squadron and several other ranks were wounded. Later that day, the regiment's 'harbour' was heavily shelled and the Commanding Officer, Lt-Col R.G. Cracroft, MC, was killed.

The following day, 148 RAC took part in Operation Kummel, once more in support of 51st (Highland) Division, and lost another squadron commander; this was to be the regiment's last action.

== Disbandment ==
On 15 August, the regiment was ordered to disband, due to a severe shortage of manpower in the British Army at the time. The regiment handed its tanks over to the 1st East Riding Yeomanry, which was to take its place in 33rd Armoured Brigade. The officers and men were posted to other regiments in the brigade or to replacement holding units. This process was completed on 27 August 1944, when the regiment ceased to exist.
