= Band of the Royal Regiment of Fusiliers =

Band of the 43rd Royal Tank Regiment Fusilier Volunteers Band Northumbrian Band Band of the Royal Regiment of Fusiliers
- Cap badge of the Royal Regiment of Fusiliers
- Active: 1951–Present
- Country: United Kingdom
- Branch: British Army
- Type: Military Band
- Garrison/HQ: Saint George's Army Reserve Centre, Newcastle upon Tyne

The Band of the Royal Regiment of Fusiliers is an Army Reserve military band part of the 5th Battalion, Royal Regiment of Fusiliers.

== History ==
In 1951 the Band of the 43rd (6th (City) Battalion, The Royal Northumberland Fusiliers) Royal Tank Regiment, or simply the Band of the 43rd Royal Tank Regiment was formed in Newcastle upon Tyne. In 1956 as part of the reductions of the Royal Armoured Corps, the 43rdRTR was redesignated as the 6th (City) Btn, RNF. In 1967, after the reductions of the Territorial Army (TA) after the 1966 Defence White Paper, the battalion was disbanded and concurrent amalgamated with the 4th/5th Battalion, Royal Northumberland Fusiliers to form A (Royal Northumberland Fusiliers) Coy in the Fusilier Volunteers. The band followed suite, joining the Fus Volunteers, becoming the Band of the Fusilier Volunteers.

Though the Fusilier Volunteers sat under the TAVR IIA category (meaning it could deploy as a battalion if mobilised), the band was placed under the TAVR IV category (UOTC and bands).

Following the formation of the 6th (Volunteer) Battalion, Royal Regiment of Fusiliers in 1975, the band transferred to the new unit and was redesignated as the Northumbrian Band of the Royal Regiment of Fusiliers. Following another reduction of the TA in 1999, the band dropped the RRS suffix, while joining the new Tyne-Tees Regiment.

Following the disbandment of the later regiment, the band became the Band of the Royal Regiment of Fusiliers on 1 April 2006, and joined the reformed 5th (Volunteer) Battalion, Royal Regiment of Fusiliers.

The band is currently based at St George's Barracks in Newcastle upon Tyne.

== Organisation ==
The current band is separated into three 'ensembles':

- Marching Band — performs at numerous Royal, Civic, Public, and Private Engagements
- Fanfare Trumpeters — provides a Regal opening for that more prestigious Occasion
- Brass Quintet — provides a wide selection of music for the more subdued event

== Notable performances ==
In December 2013 the band, joined by members of the Northern Band of the Royal Corps of Signals, Heavy Cavalry and Cambrai Band, Band of the Duke of Lancaster's Regiment to perform at Gateshead Metrocentre. Their performance included jazz and Christmas tunes.

In April 2017, the band lead the 5th Military Intelligence Battalion during a home coming parade in Berwick-upon-Tweed. Later in June the band performed at the Newcastle Military Show, showing off their musical talents by playing the "British Grenadiers" and "Blaydon Races" while on a carousel. In June 2018 they returned performing the same tunes on a ferris wheel.
