= Alan Jolly =

British Army general

General Sir Alan Jolly GCB CBE DSO
- Born: 12 November 1910; Melbourne, Victoria, Australia
- Died: 15 September 1977 (aged 66); Wallingford, Berkshire, England
- Military career
- Allegiance: United Kingdom
- Branch: British Army
- Service years: 1931–1969
- Rank: General
- Service number: 49887
- Unit: Royal Tank Regiment
- Commands: Far East Land Forces; 1st Division; 5th Division; 4th Royal Tank Regiment; 144th Regiment Royal Armoured Corps
- Conflicts: North-West Frontier; Second World War
- Awards: Knight Grand Cross of the Order of the Bath; Commander of the Order of the British Empire; Companion of the Distinguished Service Order

General Sir Alan Jolly, GCB, CBE, DSO (12 November 1910 – 15 September 1977) was a senior officer of the British Army who served as Quartermaster-General to the Forces from 1966 to 1969.

== Early career ==
Jolly joined the British Army and was commissioned into the Royal Tank Corps in 1931. He served on the North-West Frontier in India from 1936 to 1937.

== Second World War ==
During the Second World War Jolly was appointed commanding officer of the 144th Regiment Royal Armoured Corps (144 RAC, previously the 8th Battalion of the East Lancashire Regiment) on 10 April 1944, and led it throughout the campaign in North-West Europe. The regiment landed in Normandy on 14 June 1944 and first went into action during Operation Pomegranate, supporting an infantry attack on Noyers. The advance was badly hampered by minefields (both Allied and German), and 144 RAC had many tanks disabled by 'friendly' mines. This seriously reduced the force that could be used. The Official History records that "Noyers was attacked again and again" for two days, but the garrison held out, except around the station and Point 126, which was taken at bayonet point by 'A' Company of the 2/6th Battalion, South Staffordshire Regiment, following 'A' Squadron 144 RAC. Casualties to 144 RAC had been heavy and after the battle Jolly wrote a detailed report to highlight the tactical lessons learned. He became regarded as a good tactician, and infantry commanders bowed to his tactical judgement when planning joint operations.

On 8 September 1944 RAC supported the 51st (Highland) Division in the assault on the German-held French port of Le Havre (Operation Astonia). This difficult operation was successful. In October, Jolly was appointed a Companion of the Distinguished Service Order. In January 1945, 144 RAC cooperated with the 53rd (Welsh) Division in the British counter-attacks against the northern side of the 'Bulge' developed by the German Ardennes offensive.

In January 1945, 144 RAC became part of 79th Armoured Division, which operated specialist armoured vehicles, and the regiment re-equipped with Buffalo LVT amphibious vehicles to begin training for the assault crossing of the Rhine.

On 1 March 1945, 144 RAC was redesignated 4th Royal Tank Regiment to replace the original 4th RTR, which had been captured at Tobruk in June 1942. Jolly took the salute at the final parade of 144 RAC on 28 February, having arranged for the band of the East Lancashire Regiment to play the regimental march (144 RAC had originally been the 8th Battalion of the East Lancs).

Jolly led the regiment under its new title in Operation Plunder, ferrying troops of the 51st (Highland) Division across the River Rhine on the night of 23/24 March 1945. On landing, Jolly had the satisfaction of planting the First World War standard of the original 4th RTR on the far bank.

== Postwar career ==
Jolly was appointed Deputy Quartermaster General for British Army of the Rhine in 1957, General Officer Commanding (GOC) the 5th Division in 1959 and GOC 1st Division in 1960. He then became Chief of Staff for Southern Command in 1961 and Vice-Quartermaster-General at the War Office in 1962. He went on to be GOC Far East Land Forces in 1964; in this capacity he was able to report that, following British military intervention, there was hardly any terrorism in Malaysia by July 1965. He became Quartermaster-General to the Forces in 1966 and retired in 1969.

== Notes ==
Military offices
Preceded by Reginald Hobbs	General Officer Commanding 1st Division; 1960–1961	Succeeded by Thomas Pearson
Preceded by Sir Reginald Hewetson	General Officer Commanding Far East Land Forces; 1964–1966	Succeeded by Sir Michael Carver
Preceded by Sir Charles Richardson	Quartermaster-General to the Forces; 1966–1969	Succeeded by Sir Antony Read
