= Sherman Firefly =

British medium tank of WWII

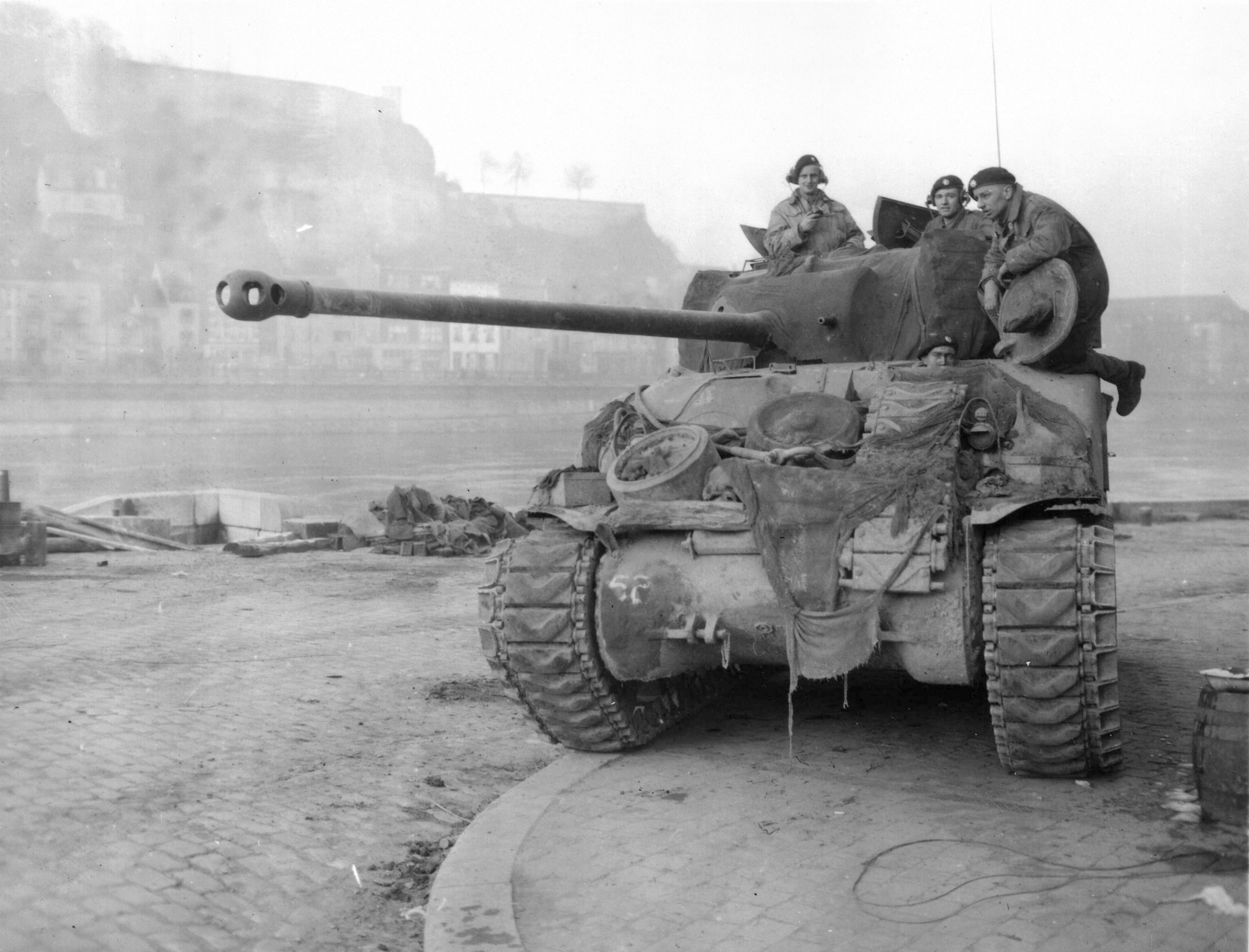
- A Sherman Firefly during the Battle of the Bulge, 1944
- Type: Medium tank
- Place of origin: United Kingdom

Production history
- Designed: 1943
- No. built: 2,100–2,200

Specifications
- Mass: 34.75 long tons (35.3 tonnes)
- Length: 19 ft 4 in (5.89 m); 25 ft 6 in (7.77 m) overall
- Width: 8 ft 8 in (2.64 m)
- Height: 9 ft 0 in (2.74 m)
- Crew: 4 (Commander, gunner, loader / radio-operator, driver)
- Armour: 89 mm maximum (turret front)
- Main armament: QF 17-pounder (76.2 mm) gun, 77 rounds
- Secondary armament: .50 in (12.7 mm) Browning M2 machine gun (generally not mounted); coaxial .30 in (7.62 mm) Browning M1919 machine gun, 5,000 rounds
- Engine: inline or radial engine petrol engine depending on chassis used 425 hp
- Power/weight: 12 hp (9 kW) / tonne
- Suspension: Vertical volute coil spring
- Operational range: 120 miles (193 km)
- Maximum speed: 20 mph (32 km/h) sustained 25 mph (40 km/h) at bursts

The Sherman Firefly was a medium tank used by the United Kingdom and some armoured formations of other Allies in the Second World War. It was based on the US M4 Sherman but was fitted with the more powerful British 76.2 mm (3.00 in) calibre 17-pounder anti-tank gun as its primary weapon. Conceived as a stopgap until future British tank designs came into service, the Sherman Firefly became the most common vehicle mounting the 17-pounder in the war.

The British Army made extensive use of Sherman tanks, but they expected to have their own tank models developed soon, so the idea of mounting the 17-pounder in the Sherman was initially rejected. However, through the efforts of two persistent British officers, government reluctance was eventually overcome, and the Firefly went into production. This proved fortunate, as the Cruiser Mk VIII Challenger and Cruiser Mk VIII Cromwell tank designs experienced difficulties and delays.

After the problem of getting such a large gun to fit in the Sherman's turret was solved, the Firefly was put into production in early 1944, in time to equip the 21st Army Group, commanded by General Bernard Montgomery, for the Normandy landings. It soon became highly valued, as its gun could almost always penetrate the armour of the Panther and Tiger tanks it faced in Normandy, something no other British or American tank could reliably do. Because the Firefly's barrel was visibly longer than that of a normal 75 mm Sherman, crews tried to countershade camouflage it so the tank would look like a regular Sherman from a distance. Between 2,100 and 2,200 were manufactured before production ended in 1945; it is unknown if this includes 100 tanks built for the United States.

== Origins ==
The idea of fitting a 17-pounder gun into a Sherman tank was rejected by the Ministry of Supply's Tank Decision Board. Although the British Army had made extensive use of the American-built Sherman, it was intended that a new generation of British tanks would replace it. First, there was the Cromwell, which was expected to use the Vickers high-velocity 75 mm gun; this gun would have had superior anti-tank performance to the US 75 mm and 76 mm guns that were mounted in the Sherman. The second was the A30 Challenger, which was based on the Cromwell but with the even more powerful 17-pounder gun. These two tanks and their successors—the Comet and the Centurion, which were already on the drawing board—were to replace the Sherman in British service and the prospect of diverting resources to mount the 17-pounder on the Sherman seemed undesirable.

Major George Brighty of the Royal Tank Regiment was at the Lulworth Armoured Fighting School in early 1943. Despite the A30 Challenger undergoing initial trials at Lulworth, Brighty was convinced that the Sherman was a better mount for the 17-pounder. The turret of the Sherman was too small to allow for the very long recoil of the gun. In a radical adjustment, Brighty removed the recoil system and locked the gun in place, thus making the entire tank absorb the recoil, but this was far from an ideal situation, and there was no telling how long the tank would have been able to handle such a setup.

Around June 1943, a colleague of Brighty, Lieutenant Colonel George Witheridge of the Royal Tank Regiment, arrived at Lulworth. A veteran of the North Africa campaign, Witheridge had experienced first-hand the one-sided battles between British tanks armed with the 40 mm 2-pounder gun and Rommel's formidable tanks and anti-tank guns. During the Battle of Gazala in mid-1942, Witheridge had been blown out of his M3 Grant medium tank, and though he recovered from his wounds, he was declared unfit to return to combat duty. In January 1943, he was posted to Fort Knox in the United States for six months to advise on gunnery, where he was "sold" on the Sherman. While at Lulworth, Witheridge inspected the A30 Challenger and "joined in the chorus of complaints" about the tank. Upon looking up Brighty and learning of his attempts to improve the Sherman, Witheridge lent his assistance. He advised Brighty on methods to solve the recoil problem.

Not long after, Witheridge and Brighty received a notice from the Department of Tank Design (DTD) to cease their efforts. Unwilling to abandon the project, Witheridge, using his connections with such influential people as Major General Raymond Briggs, former General Officer Commanding the 1st Armoured Division in North Africa and then director of the Royal Armoured Corps, successfully lobbied Claude Gibb, Director-General of Weapons and Instruments Production at the Ministry of Supply, to make it an official ministry project. Gibb was able to explain to the detractors that not only was it possible, but it should be doable in England. He had liaised with Colonel William Watson, who in late 1942 had returned from secondment to Australia to work on the production of the Australian AC1 Sentinel tank, onto which the 17-pounder had been mounted. With this development, the endeavor was taken out of the hands of the highly enthusiastic and devoted amateurs at Lulworth who had initiated it and given to professional tank developers.

== Design ==
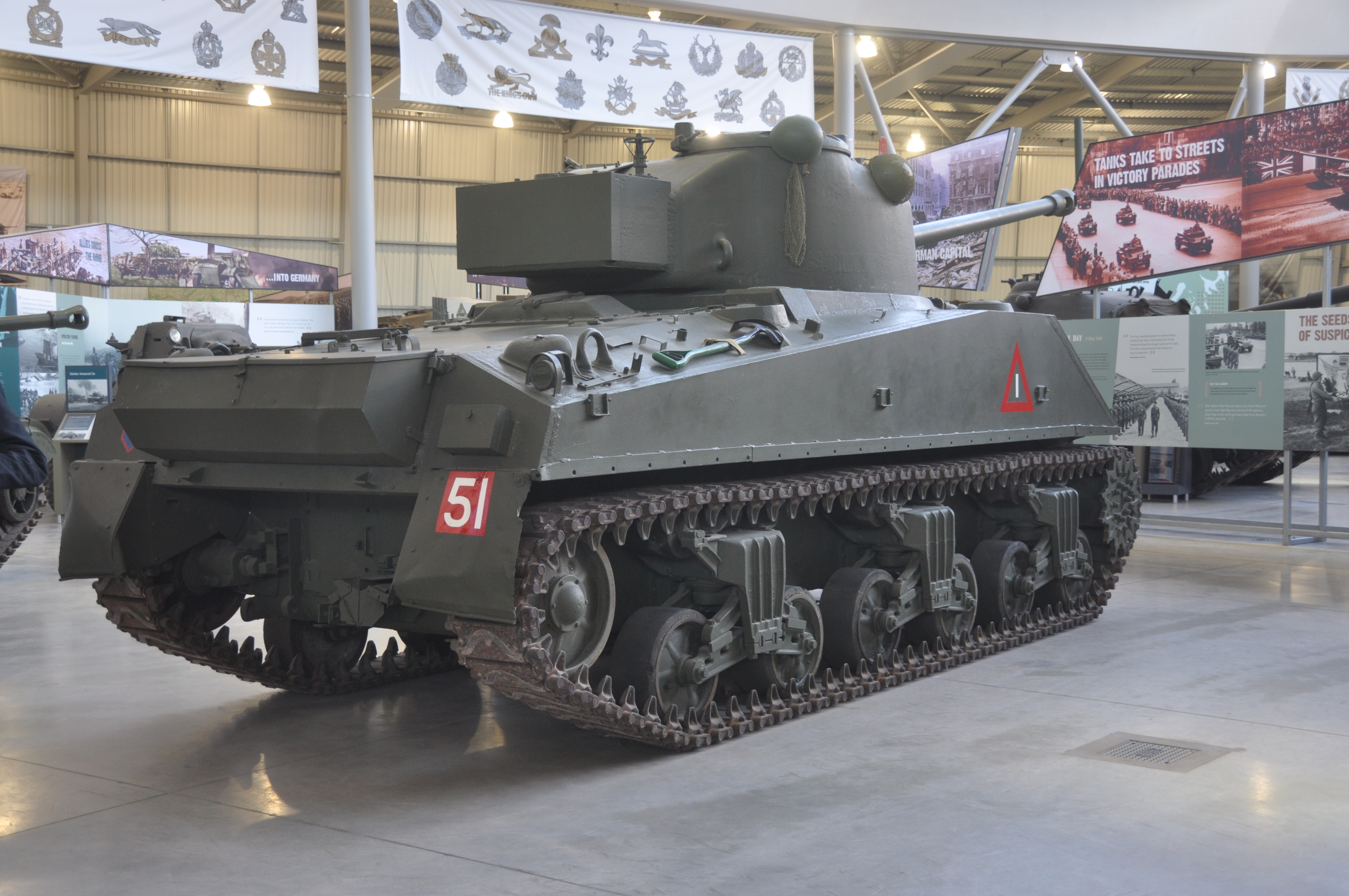
Rear view of the Firefly at the Bovington Tank Museum showing the external radio "bustle".

W. G. K. Kilbourn, a Vickers engineer working for the DTD, transformed their idea into the reality of the prototype of the tank that would serve the British forces from the invasion of Normandy in June 1944. The first thing he had to fix was the lack of a workable recoil system for the 17-pounder. The 17-pounder traveled 40 in (1.0 m) back as it absorbed the recoil of the blast. This was too long for the Sherman's turret. Kilbourn solved this problem by redesigning the recoil system completely rather than modifying it. The recoil cylinders were shortened and placed on both sides of the gun to take advantage of the width of the turret.

The gun breech itself was also rotated 90 degrees to allow loading from the left rather than from on top. (Note: US-designed tanks put the gunner on the right and loader on the left. British practice was the reverse.) The radio, normally mounted in the back of the turret in British tanks, had to be moved; an armoured box (a "bustle") was attached to the back of the turret to house it, with access through a large hole cut through the turret.

The next problem encountered by Kilbourn was that the gun cradle, the metal block on which the gun sat, had to be shortened to allow the gun to fit into the Firefly, and thus the gun itself was not very stable. Kilbourn had a new barrel designed for the 17-pounder that had a longer untapered section at the base, which helped solve the stability problem. A new mantlet was designed to house this gun and the modified cradle. The Firefly had no armour or mobility advantages over the normal Sherman tank beyond the additional 13 mm of protection added to its mantlet. The modifications were extensive enough that 17-pounders intended for the Firefly had to be factory-built specifically for it.

Kilbourn had to deal with additional complications. On the standard Sherman tank, there was a single hatch in the turret through which the commander, gunner, and loader entered and exited the tank. The 17-pounder's larger breech and recoil system made it significantly more difficult for the loader to exit quickly; a new hatch was cut into the top of the turret over the gunner's position to resolve this. The final major change was the elimination of the hull gunner in favour of space for more 17-pounder ammunition, which was longer than the original 75 mm.

By October and November 1943, enthusiasm began to grow for the project. The 21st Army Group was informed of the new tank in October. Even before final testing had taken place in February 1944, an order for 2,100 Sherman tanks armed with the 17-pounder gun was placed, as the Challenger program was suffering constant delays and it was realized that few would be ready for Normandy. Even worse, it was discovered that the Cromwell did not have a turret ring wide enough to take the new High Velocity 75 mm gun (50 calibres long), so it would have to be armed with the general purpose Ordnance QF 75 mm. This left the Firefly as the only tank available with firepower superior to the QF 75 mm gun in the British arsenal, earning it the "highest priority" from Winston Churchill.

== Name ==
The nickname "Firefly" was a British nickname given to armored vehicles with an adapted 17-pounder due to either the bright muzzle flash or because of the detonation of leftover gunpowder while firing, creating a flash that was directed towards both the gunner and loader. The nickname was only recorded to be used by the British army and was never officially adopted. During the war, Shermans with 17-pounder guns were usually known as "1C", "1C Hybrid", or "VC", depending on the basic mark of the vehicle. In British nomenclature, a "C" at the end of the Roman numeral indicated a tank equipped with the 17-pounder. (Note: for more on the explanation of the various marks, see Lend-Lease Sherman tanks#British nomenclature)

The name "Firefly" in period sources often refers to any vehicle with a 17-pounder gun, often the 17pdr SP Achilles M10C variant of the M10 tank destroyer.

== Armament ==
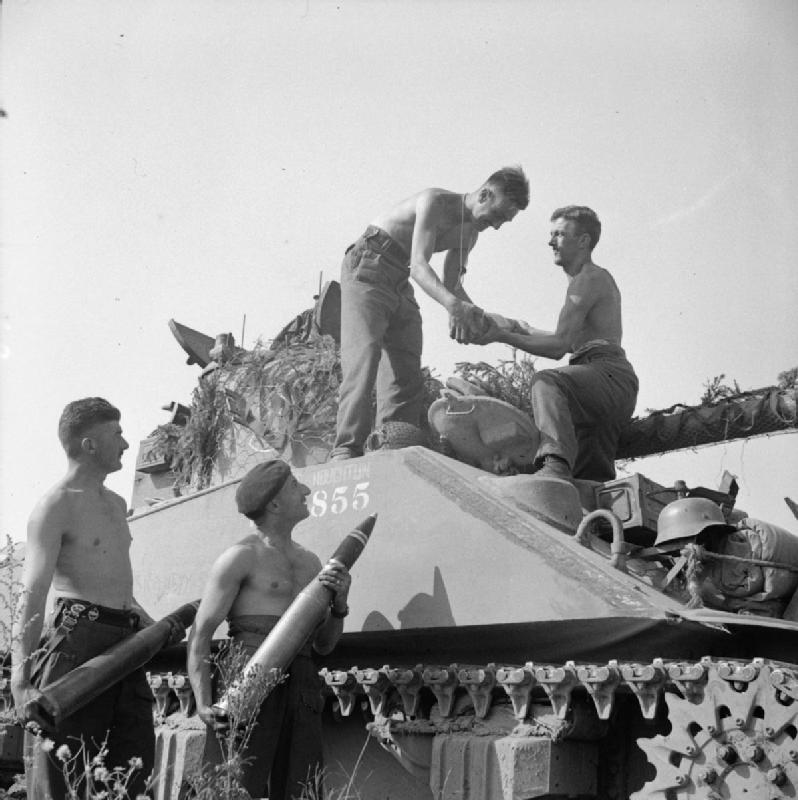
Loading 17-pounder APCBC rounds into a Firefly

The main armament of the Sherman Firefly was the Ordnance Quick-Firing 17-pounder. Designed as the successor to the British QF 6-pounder, the 17-pounder was the most powerful British tank gun of the war, and one of the most powerful of any nationality, being able to penetrate more armour than the 8.8 cm KwK 36 fitted to the German Tiger I. The 17-pounder was theoretically able to penetrate some 163 mm (6.4 in) of armour at 500 m (550 yd) and 150 mm (5.9 in) at 1,000 m (1,100 yd) using standard armour piercing, capped, ballistic capped (APCBC) ammunition. Armour piercing, discarding sabot (APDS) ammunition could penetrate some 256 mm of armor at 500 m and 233 mm at 1,000 m, which on paper could defeat the armour of almost every German armoured fighting vehicle at any likely range. However, war production APDS rounds lacked accuracy, and the 50 mm penetrator was less destructive after it had penetrated enemy tank armour than the 76.2 mm APCBC shell. APDS ammunition was rare until the post-war period. While the Sherman Firefly was capable of carrying 77 rounds of ammunition, the tank's design features meant that only 23 rounds were easily and readily available when the tank was in action.

Though the 17-pounder had superior anti-tank capabilities, it lacked an effective HE round and was thus inferior to the standard Sherman 75 mm gun against soft targets, such as infantry, buildings, and lightly armoured vehicles. As the war in Europe neared its close, the Allies found themselves encountering these more often than heavy German tanks. Allied tank units, therefore, typically refused to completely switch to Fireflies. A good HE shell for the gun only became available in late 1944 and even then was not as potent as the standard Sherman 75 mm HE shell.

Another problem was that the powerful blast from the 17-pounder gun kicked up large amounts of dirt as well as smoke, making it difficult for the gunner to observe the fall of the shot (and forcing him to rely on the commander to observe it and to order corrections) and revealing the position of the tank (forcing the Firefly to move every few shots). The recoil and muzzle blast could be severely jarring to Firefly crews, and the muzzle blast frequently caused night blindness. The latter was a problem common to any tank armed with a high-velocity gun, including the Panther and Tiger I. The cramped turret meant that loading the large shell was difficult, so the Firefly had a slower rate of fire than a standard M4 Sherman. Since the Firefly was a stopgap, these problems were never eliminated, as it was supposed to be retired with the introduction of the new British tank designs such as the Comet and later Centurion.

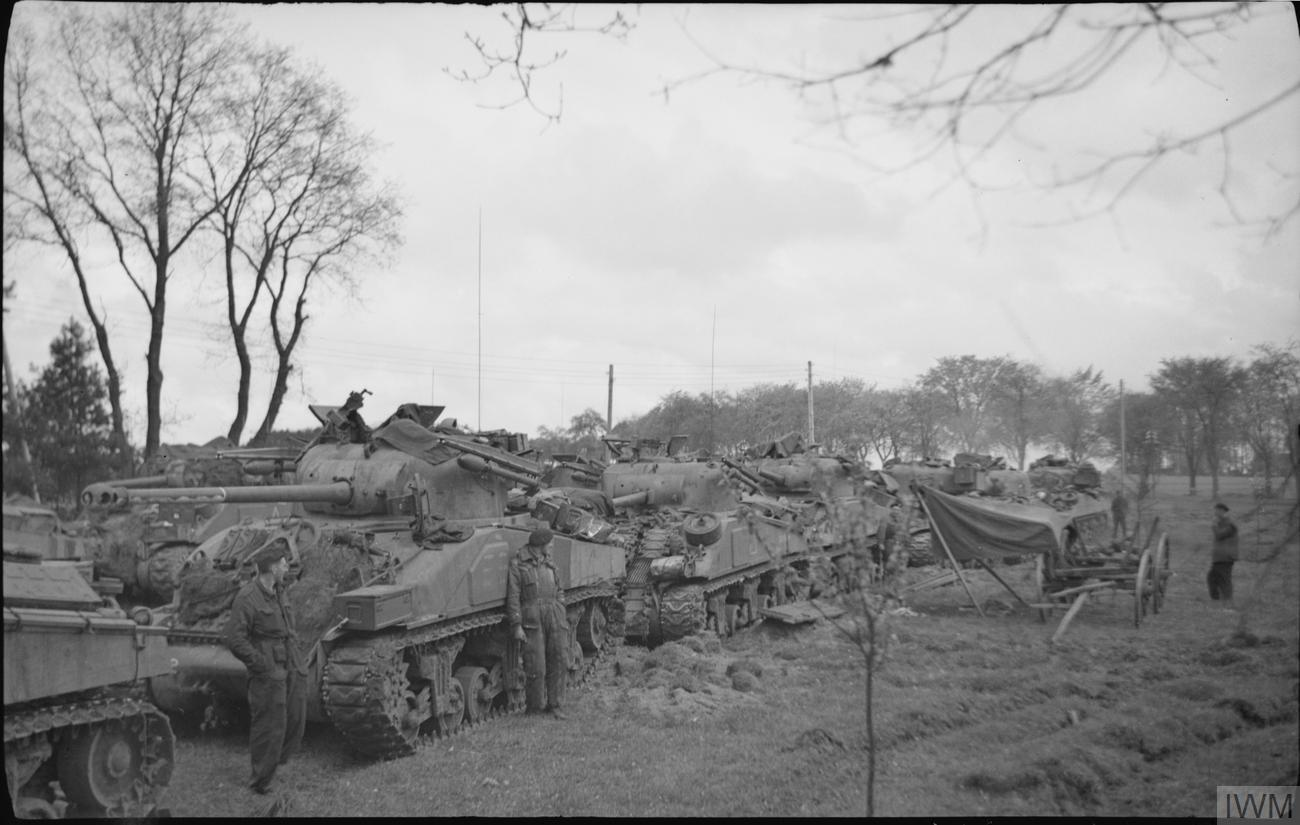
British Army Sherman Tulip on the left. Note the 17-pounder gun, countershaded to appear like the standard 75 mm gun seen on the center tanks.

The Firefly's secondary armament was the standard 0.3 inch (7.62 mm) Browning M1919 machine gun coaxial in the turret, the hull-mounted machine gun being removed to increase ammunition storage for the main gun. A .50-inch (12.7 mm) M2 Browning heavy machine gun was also fitted on the turret roof, though many crews removed it, due to its awkward mounting and position near the commander, which limited a full 360-degree view when the hatch was open.

In 1945, some British Fireflies were fitted with a rail on either side of the turret for two RP-3 "60lb" high-explosive 3-inch rockets. Called "Sherman Tulips", these were used at the Rhine crossing by the 1st Battalion, Coldstream Guards. The rockets, accurate when fired from aircraft, were less accurate when fired from a stationary platform, such as a tank, as they had little initial slipstream over the fins. The RP-3 was only effective when its 60-pound warhead hit the target.

== Production and distribution ==
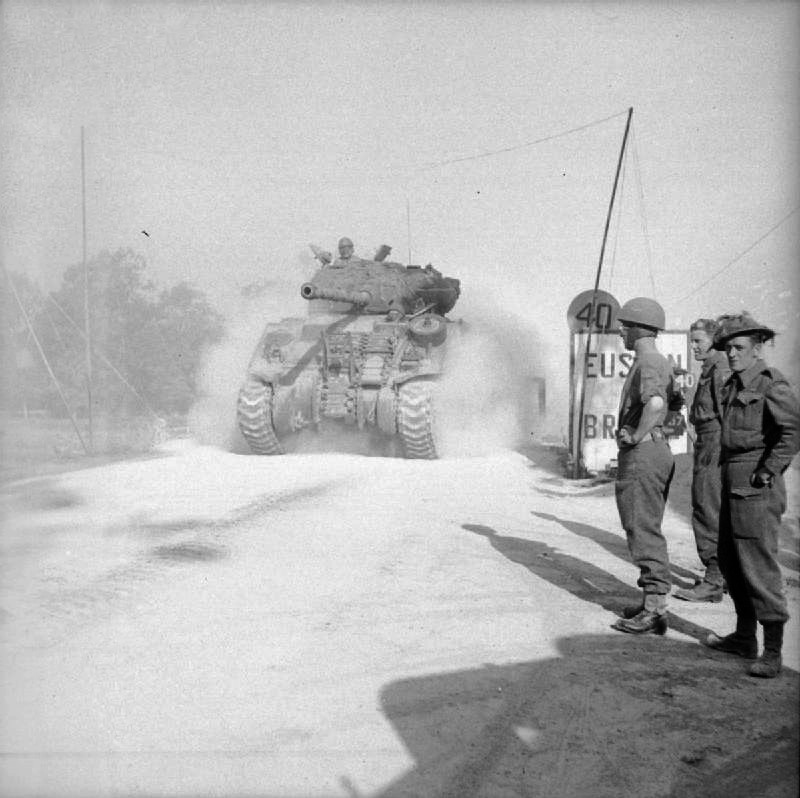
A Sherman Firefly crosses 'Euston Bridge' over the Orne as it moves up to the start line for Operation Goodwood, 18 July 1944

Three different variants of Sherman Firefly served during the Second World War, each based on a different variant of the M4 Sherman. The Firefly conversion was carried out on Sherman I (M4), Sherman I Hybrid (M4 Composite), Sherman IV (M4A3, 65-68 built for the United States), and Sherman V (M4A4) tanks. Some sources state that several Sherman IIs (M4A1) were converted and used in action, but photos allegedly showing these conversions are, in fact, views of the front half of Sherman I Hybrid Fireflies. To complicate matters, a very small number of Canadian license-built Sherman IIs (M4A1), the Grizzly, were converted to Fireflies in Canada and used for training, but none saw action. The majority of Shermans converted were the Sherman V/M4A4 model, of which the British received about 7,200. The Sherman VC and IC variants are easily distinguished by their lower hulls; the VC has a lengthened hull and larger gaps between the suspension units. They employed the three-piece bolted transmission housing. The Sherman IC usually had a cast transmission housing. The Hybrid can be distinguished by its upper hull, which is cast and gives it a distinctive curved look in comparison to the more boxy hull of a typical Sherman.

Production of the Firefly started in January 1944 and, by 31 May, some 342 Sherman Fireflies had been delivered to the 21st Army Group for the D-Day landings. British tank troops were composed of three units equipped with standard Shermans and one with Fireflys. The same distribution occurred in Cromwell units, but this caused logistical problems, as each Cromwell troop then needed to be supplied with parts for two different tanks. The Firefly was also slower than the Cromwell. Churchill units received no Fireflies, and as a result, often had to rely on any attached M10 or M10 Achilles units to provide increased firepower to deal with tanks their own guns could not handle.

Production was limited by the availability of suitable tanks, with the phasing out of 75 mm Sherman production. To make up numbers, Sherman I and Sherman I Hybrids were also converted. From D-Day in June to the end of the Battle of Normandy in late August, almost 400 Sherman Fireflies were converted, more than sufficient to replace any permanent tank losses during the battle. In late 1944, with the creation of an effective high-explosive shell for the 17-pounder gun, British units started to receive two Fireflies per troop. By February 1945, some 2,000 Sherman Fireflies had been built, and British, Commonwealth, and Polish armoured units were equipped with a 50/50 mix of 75 mm and 17-pounder-armed Shermans.

In spring 1945, production of the Firefly was scaled down, with the last tank being delivered in May 1945. This was the result of several factors, from superior home-grown designs like the Comet and Centurion coming into service to replace the Firefly, to the impending defeat of Nazi Germany, and the inferior design of Japan's tanks, which it seemed would be the next opponents the British would have to face after the fall of Germany.

Production of the Sherman Firefly reached some 2,100–2,200 tanks; exact numbers are hard to determine as documents give contradictory totals. Jane's World War II Tanks and Fighting Vehicles gives a production of 1,783 vehicles in 1944 and 563 in 1945, for a total of 2,346. Sherman Firefly gives a number of 2,002 conversions made between January 1944 and February 1945 or a total of 2,139 conversions.

== Service ==
=== Normandy ===
Fireflies were introduced to armoured brigades (Note: The British "Tank Brigades" were equipped with Churchills) and divisions in the 21st Army Group in 1944, just in time for the Normandy landings. The timing was fortunate as Allied intelligence had begun to realize in early 1944 through statistical analysis that the Germans were fielding a much larger number of more formidable tanks (such as the Panther) than had been anticipated. This information was slow to reach Allied military planners, who had mistakenly assumed the Panther, like the Tiger, would be a rare heavy tank with a limited production run, so the number of Panthers deployed came as a surprise to Allied formation commanders and tank crews forced to engage them with guns that could not penetrate the frontal armor except at short range.

Ken Tout, who served as a tank gunner and tank commander in the 1st Northamptonshire Yeomanry in Normandy in 1944, described the effect of mounting a 17-pounder in the Sherman:

The Firefly tank is an ordinary Sherman, but, to accommodate the immense breech of the 17-pounder and to store its massive shells, the co-driver has been eliminated and his little den has been used as storage space. ... The flash is so brilliant that both the gunner and commander need to blink at the moment of firing. Otherwise, they will be blinded for so long that they will not see the shot hit the target. The muzzle flash spurts out so much flame that, after a shot or two, the hedge or undergrowth in front of the tank is likely to start burning. When moving, the gun's overlap in front or, if traversed, to the side is so long that the driver, gunner, and commander have to be constantly alert to avoid wrapping the barrel around some apparently distant tree, defenseless lamp-post, or inoffensive house.

Panthers and Tigers accounted for only about 126 of the 2,300 German tanks deployed in Normandy; the rest were Panzer IVs, Sturmgeschütz III tank destroyers, and other armoured vehicles that the 75 mm Shermans could penetrate. The importance of Caen and Montgomery's operations, which pinned German armoured forces in front of the British positions so the American units could break out to the west, meant that British and other Commonwealth units had to face over 70 percent of the German armour deployed during the Battle of Normandy, as well as over half of the elite, well-equipped Waffen-SS Panzer units. As a result, the Sherman Firefly was perhaps the most valued tank by British and other Commonwealth commanders, as it was the only tank in the British Army able to reliably penetrate the frontal armour of Panthers and Tigers at the standard combat ranges in Normandy.

This fact did not go unnoticed by the Germans, who realized that these long-barreled Shermans posed a much greater threat to their heavy tanks than the normal Shermans, and German tank crews and anti-tank gun crews were instructed to eliminate Fireflies first. Similarly, the Firefly crews realized that the distinctive long barrel of their 17-pounder gun made their Fireflies stand out from standard Shermans, so they attempted to disguise their tanks to reduce the likelihood of being targeted. Some crews had the front half of the olive drab gun barrel painted white on the bottom, or white with dark green on top, to give the illusion of a shorter gun barrel. Another suggestion was for a shorter wooden dummy gun to be mounted on the rear of the turret and point forward; however, this tactic does not appear to have been used in combat.

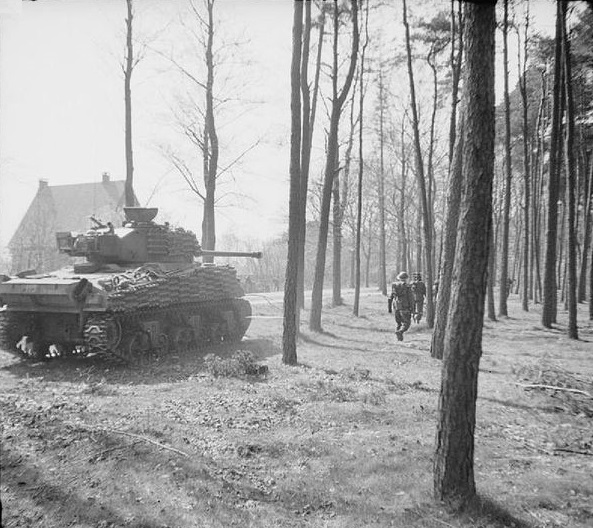
Firefly of 5th Canadian Armoured Division assists troops of 49th (West Riding) Division to clear the Germans from Ede, Netherlands, 17 April 1945

Despite being a high-priority target, Fireflies appear to have had a statistically lower chance of being knocked out than standard Shermans, probably due more to how they were employed than to the effectiveness of the camouflaging of the long barrel. Given the high value placed on Fireflies, a common tactic was for commanders to reconnoitre the battlefield before a battle, to look for good overwatch positions. During the battle, Fireflies would stay behind in those positions and cover the ordinary Shermans as they pushed forward, eliminating any enemy tanks that revealed themselves when they opened fire on the advancing Shermans, and moving forward only when the standard Shermans had secured the area or when the Fireflies could no longer cover them. Similarly, when on the move, troop commanders tended to position Fireflies in the rear to reduce the chance of their being knocked out. Given the relatively unpredictable nature of battle, this was not always possible, and many times, Fireflies were forced to engage enemies in the open, where they could be identified.

Despite this, the Firefly's increased firepower was much valued, and during many engagements, the Firefly proved its worth, knocking out Tigers and Panthers at long range, as well as less formidable tanks such as Panzer IVs and StuG tank destroyers.

==== Norrey-en-Bessin ====
The advantage of this increased firepower was shown by Lt. G. K. Henry's Firefly during the defence of Norrey-en-Bessin on 9 June against an attack by the 3rd Company of the 12th SS Panzer Regiment of the 12th SS Panzer Division Hitlerjugend. Determined to capture the village in preparation for a larger offensive to drive the British and Canadians back into the sea, Kurt Meyer ordered 12 Panthers of the 3rd Company and infantry to attack Norrey and drive out the Canadians. The attack got underway at 1300 hours, with the Panthers racing towards the town at full speed, stopping only to fire their guns. They quickly outran their infantry support, which was forced to ground by Allied artillery fire. Within 1,000 m (1,100 yd) of the village, nine standard Shermans of the Canadian 6th Canadian Armoured Regiment opened fire into the advancing Panthers' flanks. Lt. Henry's gunner, Trooper A. Chapman, waited until the Panthers "lined up like ducks in a row" and quickly knocked out five Panthers with just six rounds. The attack was repulsed with the loss of seven of the 12 Panthers.

==== Tilly-sur-Seulles ====
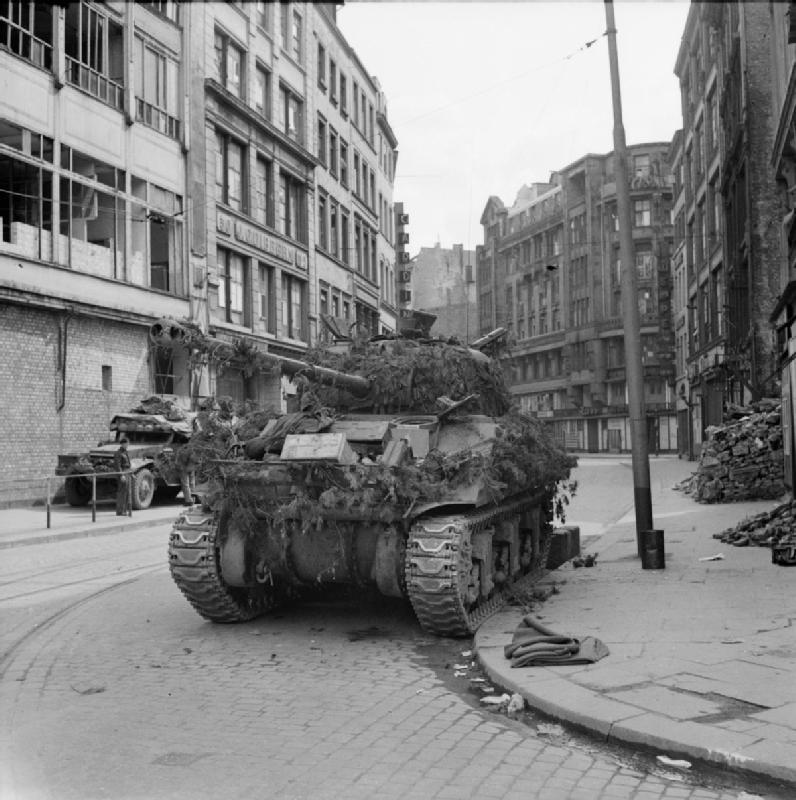
A Sherman Firefly of 7th Armoured Division in Hamburg, 4 May 1945

A similar event occurred on 14 June, during Operation Perch. Sgt. Harris of the 4th/7th Dragoon Guards, along with three standard Shermans, set up defensive positions along with the infantry after capturing the village of Lingèvres, near Tilly-sur-Seulles, France. Looking through his binoculars, Sgt. Harris spotted two Panthers advancing from the east. He opened fire at a range of 800 m (870 yd), knocking out the lead Panther with his first shot, and the other with his second. Relocating to a well-concealed flanking position on the other side of the town, he spotted another three Panthers approaching from the west. He and his gunner, Trooper Mackillop, knocked them out with three rounds.

==== Saint-Aignan-de-Cramesnil ====
In perhaps their most famous action, British and Canadian Fireflies defeated the heavy armour of a German counterattack at Saint-Aignan-de-Cramesnil during Operation Totalize on 8 August 1944, resulting in the destruction of five Tiger tanks and the death of the attack's leader, the noted German tank commander Michael Wittmann. The battle involved Fireflies from A Squadron, 1st Northamptonshire Yeomanry, 33rd Armoured Brigade; A Squadron, the Sherbrooke Fusiliers Regiment, 2nd Canadian Armoured Brigade, and B Squadron, The 144th Regiment Royal Armoured Corps, 33rd Armoured Brigade. They ambushed a group of seven Tiger tanks from the 3rd Company and HQ Company, 101st SS Heavy Tank Battalion supported by Panzer IV tanks and StuG IV assault guns, which were attempting to retake the high ground. The tanks of the 1st Northamptonshire Yeomanry reached the French village of Saint-Aignan-de-Cramesnil on the morning of 8 August 1944. While B Squadron stayed around the village, A and C Squadrons moved further south into a wood called Delle de la Roque.

C Squadron positioned themselves on the east side of the woods, and the under-strength A Squadron in the southern portion, with No. 3 Troop on the western edge of the woods. From this position, they overlooked a large open section of ground and were able to watch as German tanks advanced up Route Nationale 158 from the village of Cintheaux. They held their fire until the German tanks were well within range. Joe Ekins, the gunner of Sergeant Gordon's Sherman Firefly (Velikiye Luki – A Squadron's tanks were named after towns in the Soviet Union) had yet to fire his gun in action. With the Tigers in range, a 12-minute exchange of fire commenced that saw Ekins destroy all three Tigers that No. 3 Troop could see. A short time later, the main German counterattack was made in the direction of C Squadron. A Squadron (less Sgt Gordon, who had been wounded and had already bailed out of the Firefly) moved over to support them, and Ekins destroyed a Panzer IV before his tank was hit and the crew were forced to bail out.

=== Italy ===
Although the Normandy campaign had priority, Fireflies also served with distinction in British, Commonwealth, and Polish units in the Italian campaign. British units in Italy also used the Sherman with the US 76 mm gun M1.

=== Post-war use ===
==== Argentina ====
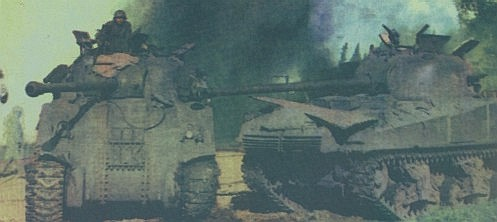
Two Argentine Fireflies during the "Azules y Colorados" revolt, in 1963

In 1947, the Argentine Army purchased surplus armament that was stored in Belgium, including some 200 Sherman Fireflies of all sub-types; they were in use from 1948. Starting in 1959, 150 Fireflies Mk.V had their original Chrysler A57 engine substituted for a Ford GAA V8, to improve reliability; these remained in service until the mid-1970s. Due to an increase in regional conflicts, the Fireflies were up-graded to the "Sherman Repotenciado" standard, which included a new gun (derived from the French CN-105-57) and a new engine (the French diesel Poyaud 520/V8-S2); the first units were incorporated in January 1978.

==== Paraguay ====
In 1971, the Argentine Army transferred to the Paraguayan Army three upgraded Fireflies; these were exchanged in 1988 for three "Sherman Repotenciados" recently decommissioned.

==== Lebanon ====
In 1949, the Lebanese Army purchased 16 Firefly Mk Vc tanks from Italy as scrap. These tanks first saw action during the 1958 Lebanon crisis, being subsequently retired from frontline service and replaced by 18 M41A3 Walker Bulldog light tanks provided by the United States. The Lebanese Shermans remained in reserve storage until 1976, when two of them were seized by the Al-Mourabitoun militia and the remaining 14 taken by the Lebanese Arab Army (LAA), which were employed by these two factions in the Lebanese Civil War. All the vehicles were returned to Lebanese Army ownership in 1977-78 when they were finally decommissioned.

== Operators ==
=== World War II ===
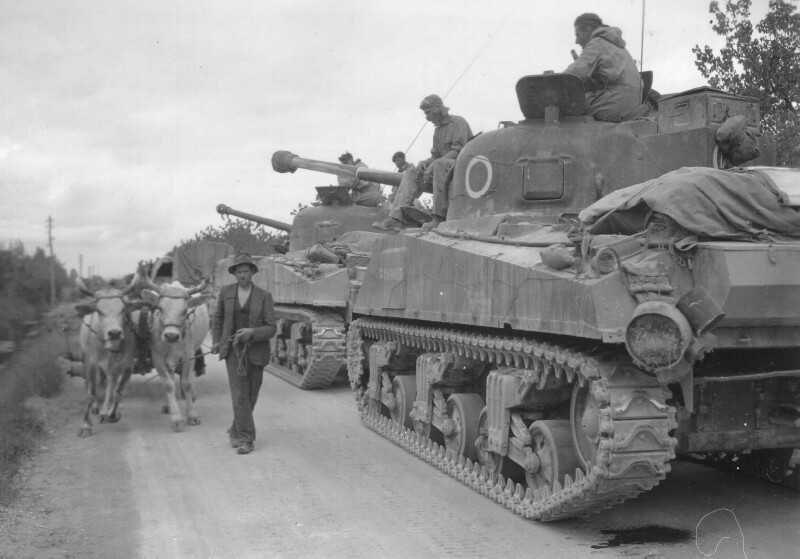
Firefly tanks of the South African Pretoria Regiment, Italy 1944

United Kingdom

North-West Europe

- 4th Armoured Brigade
- 8th Armoured Brigade
- 27th Armoured Brigade
- 33rd Armoured Brigade
- Guards Armoured Division
- 7th Armoured Division
- 11th Armoured Division

Kingdom of Italy

- 1st Armoured Division
- 6th Armoured Division

(The 7th Armoured Brigade and 9th Armoured Brigade do not appear to have used Fireflies.)

Canada

- 1st Canadian Armoured Brigade received two Fireflies per troop when it moved to the Netherlands from Italy in 1945.
- 2nd Canadian Armoured Brigade
- 4th Canadian Armoured Division
- 5th Canadian Armoured Division used Firefly tanks in northwest Europe in 1945.

New Zealand

- The 4th New Zealand Armoured Brigade operated Firefly tanks in Italy in 1944 and 1945.

Poland

- Both the Polish 1st Armoured Division in northwestern Europe and the Polish 2nd Armoured Brigade in Italy operated Firefly tanks.

Czechoslovakia

- 1st Czechoslovak Independent Armoured Brigade

South Africa

- The 6th South African Armoured Division operated Firefly tanks in Italy in 1944 and 1945.

United States

- The United States received 80 specially made fireflies. They were uniquely operated 56-58 M4A3 based (with the rest being M4).

=== Post-war ===
Argentina

- The Argentine Army purchased over 200 in 1947, in service until the mid-1970s.

Belgium
Italy
Lebanon

- The Lebanese Army received 16 Firefly tanks sold by Italy as scrap in 1949, in service until the mid-1970s. Two of them were passed on to the Al-Mourabitoun militia and 14 to the Lebanese Arab Army in 1976.

Netherlands
Paraguay

- Received 3 donated by Argentina in 1971.

== Surviving vehicles ==
The Tank Museum at Bovington in the United Kingdom has a Sherman Vc.

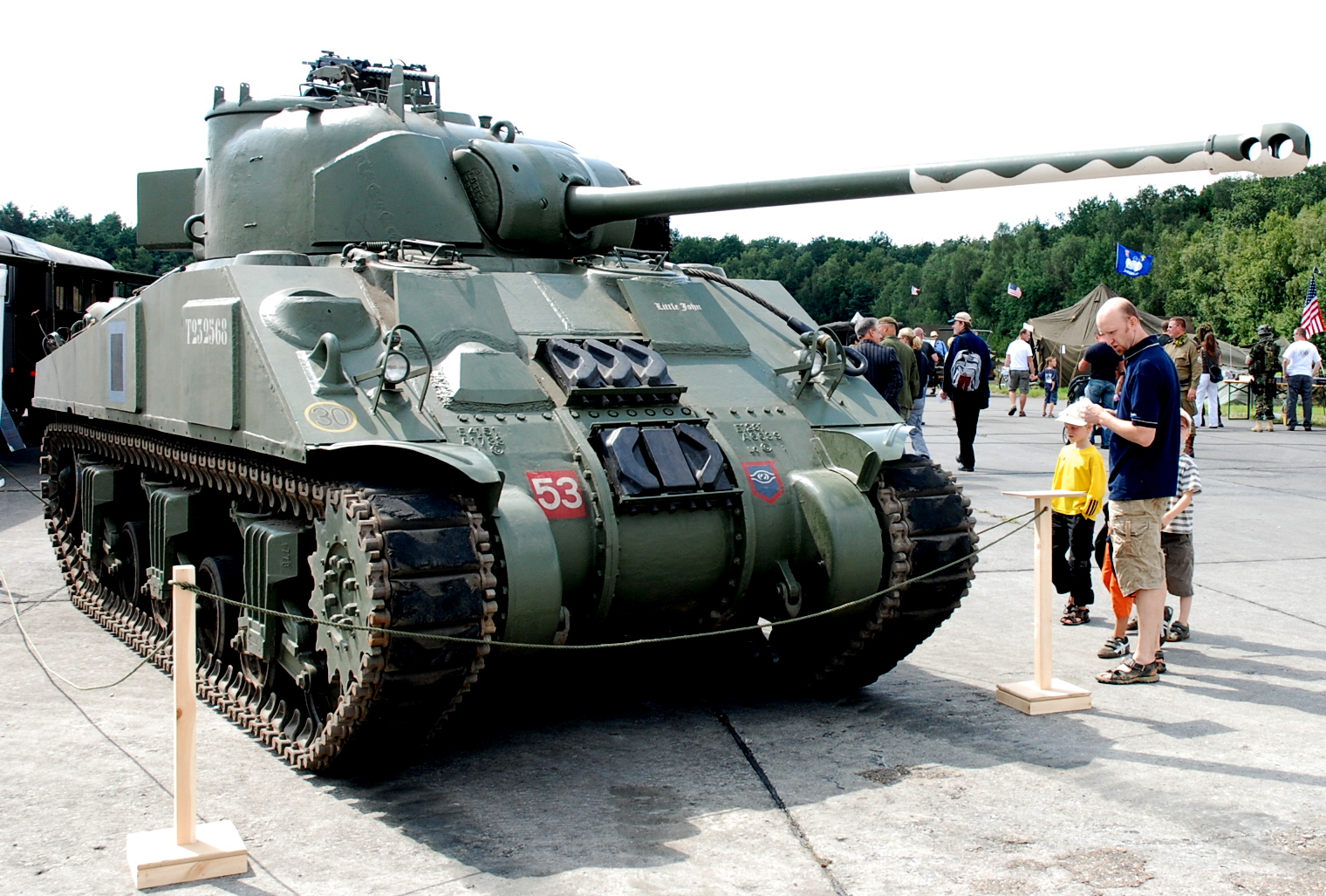
A Firefly VC in Ursel Air Base, Belgium; gun barrel is painted with countershading pattern used to disguise length

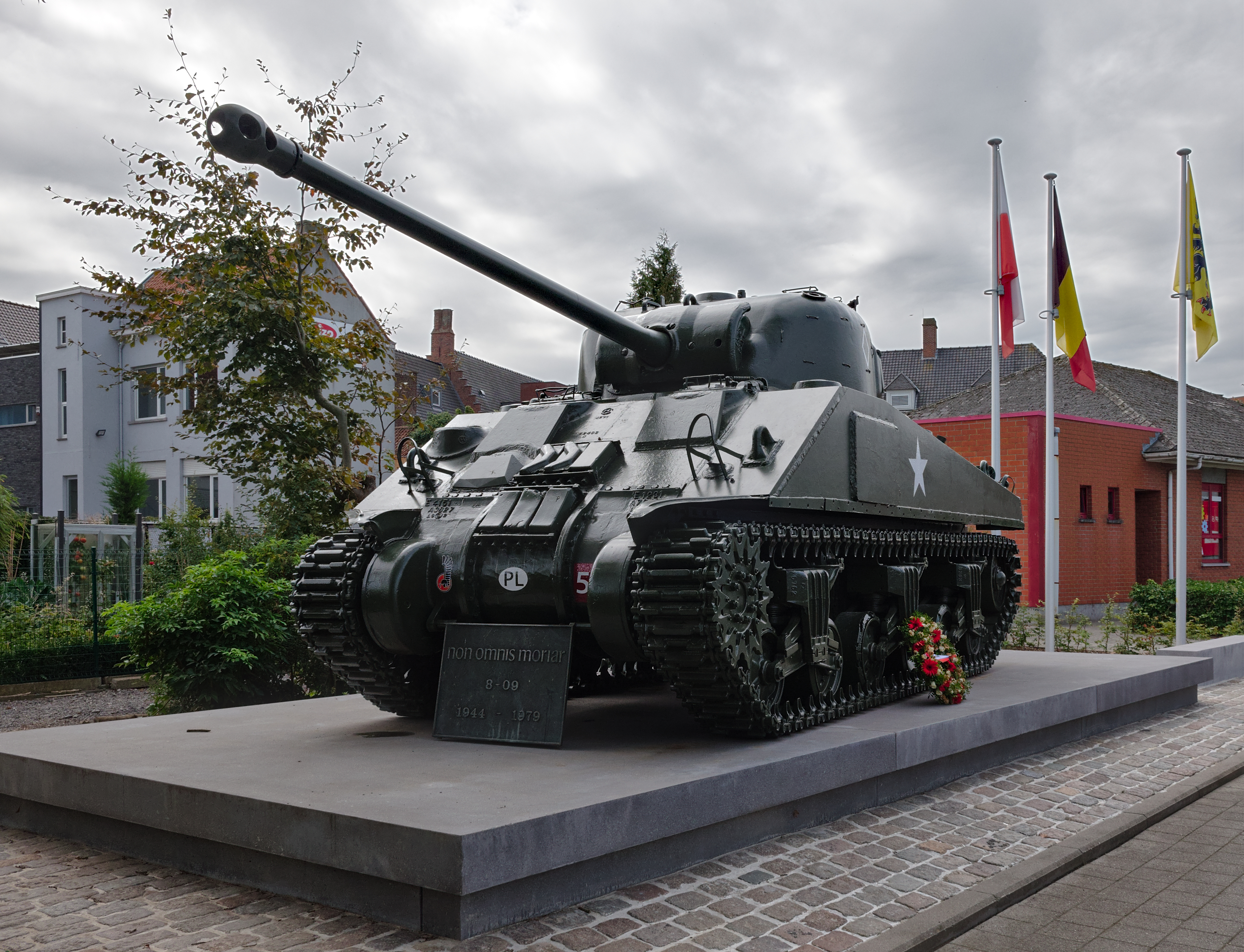
Firefly VC of 1st Polish Armoured Division at the Tielt liberation monument

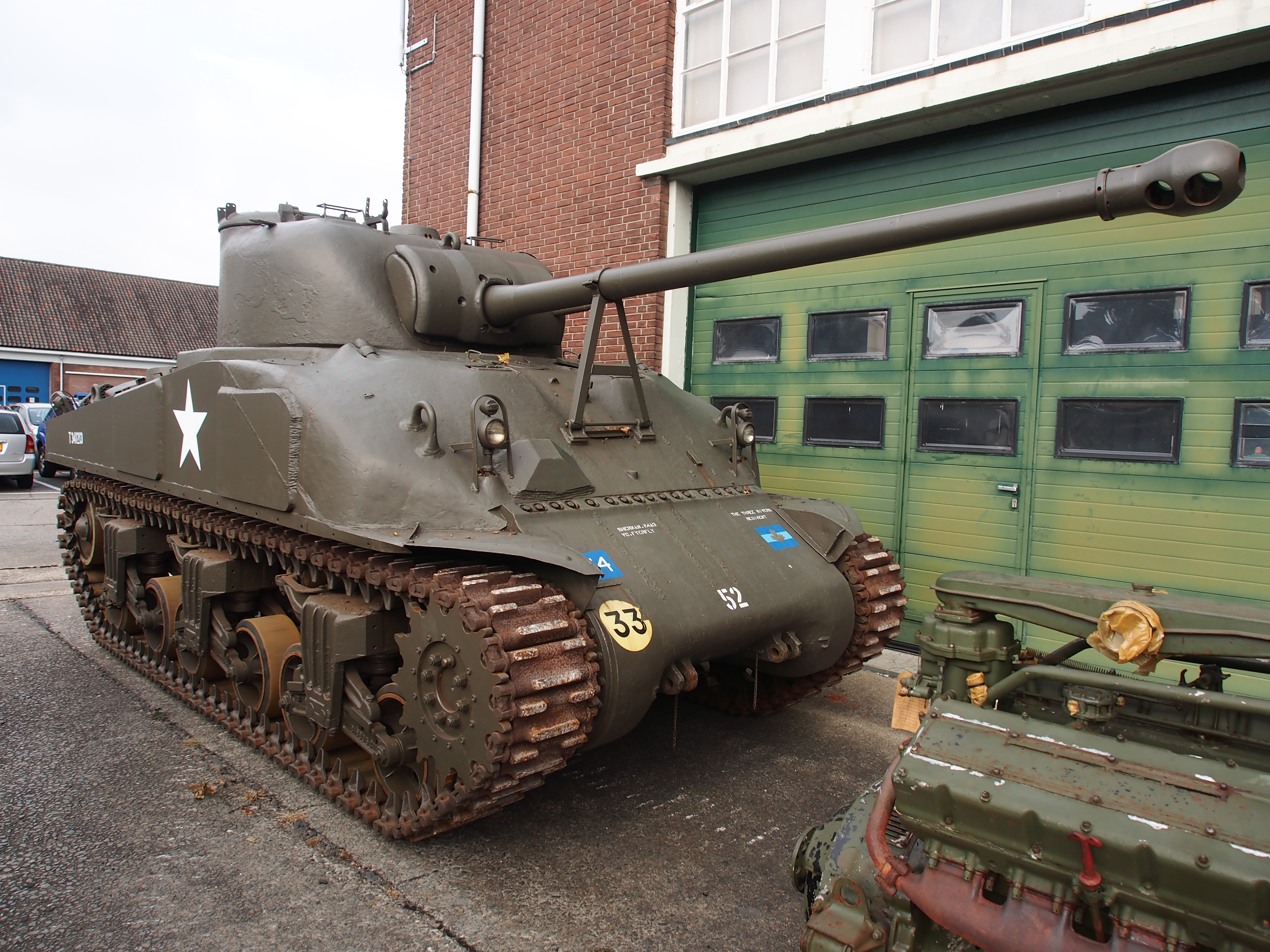
A Firefly IC Hybrid in the Dutch Cavalry Museum at Amersfoort

== See also ==
- M4 Sherman variants
- Lend-Lease Sherman tanks
- Allied technological cooperation during World War II
- ROF Nottingham (carried out conversion)
- Ordnance QF 75 mm
