= 144th Regiment Royal Armoured Corps =

8th Battalion, East Lancashire Regiment 144th Regiment Royal Armoured Corps
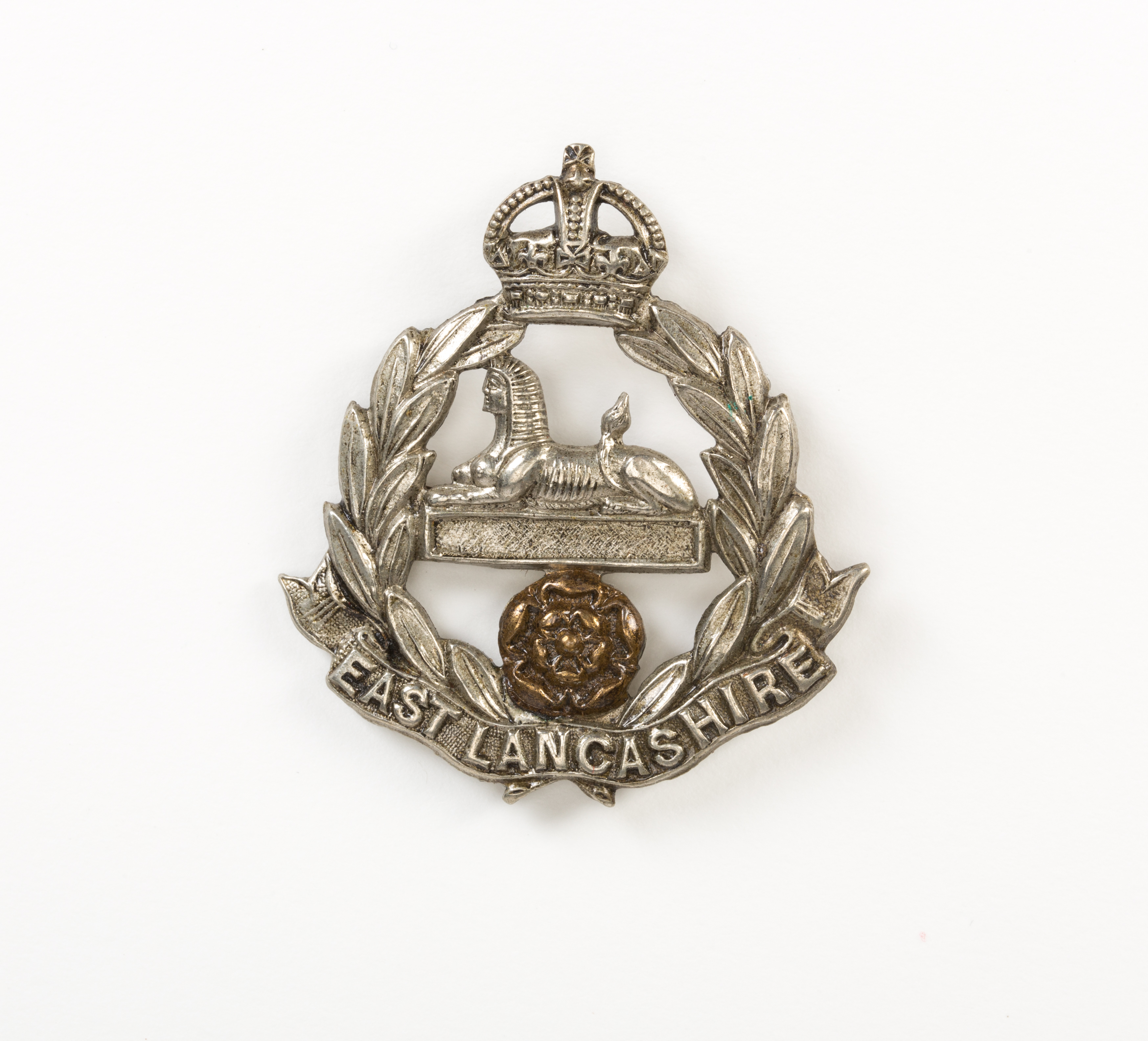
- East Lancashire Regiment cap badge worn by 144 RAC
- Active: 1940–1945
- Disbanded: 1 March 1945
- Country: United Kingdom
- Branch: British Army
- Type: Infantry; Armoured
- Size: Battalion; Regiment
- Part of: Royal Armoured Corps

Commanders
- Notable commanders: Alan Jolly

The 144th Regiment Royal Armoured Corps (144 RAC) was an armoured regiment of the British Army. Originally raised during World War II as a battalion of the East Lancashire Regiment it was later transferred to the Royal Armoured Corps. It fought in the campaign in North-West Europe, from June 1944 to May 1945.

== 8th Battalion, East Lancashire Regiment ==
The origin of 144th Regiment RAC was a company of men of the East Lancashire Regiment in a Mixed Holding Battalion formed at Huyton, near Liverpool, Lancashire early in World War II. The company formed the nucleus of the 50th (Holding) Battalion, East Lancashire Regiment, and after the Fall of France a draft of veterans from the British Expeditionary Force (BEF) was added and the battalion became the 8th Battalion, East Lancashire Regiment. (Note: Another source states that 50th Holding Bn became 7th Bn East Lancashires in July 1940, and later converted to 103rd Light Anti-Aircraft Regiment, Royal Artillery. The likelihood is that both the 7th and 8th Bns originated from the same pool of men in 50th Holding Bn.)

On 26 July 1941, 8th East Lancashires joined 226th Independent Infantry Brigade (Home), a static defence brigade in Dorset County Division. The battalion left on 19 November (shortly afterwards, the brigade was converted into 34th Army Tank Brigade).

== 144th Regiment, Royal Armoured Corps ==
144th Regiment RAC was formed at Rufford Abbey on 22 November 1941 by the conversion of the 8th East Lancashire Regiment to the armoured role. The Commanding Officer (CO), Lieutenant Colonel S.T. James, remained in command. In common with other infantry battalions transferred to the Royal Armoured Corps, all personnel would have continued to wear their East Lancashire cap badge on the black beret of the RAC. 144th Regiment RAC was assigned to the 33rd Tank Brigade for training in the United Kingdom, and remained with this brigade for virtually its entire service.

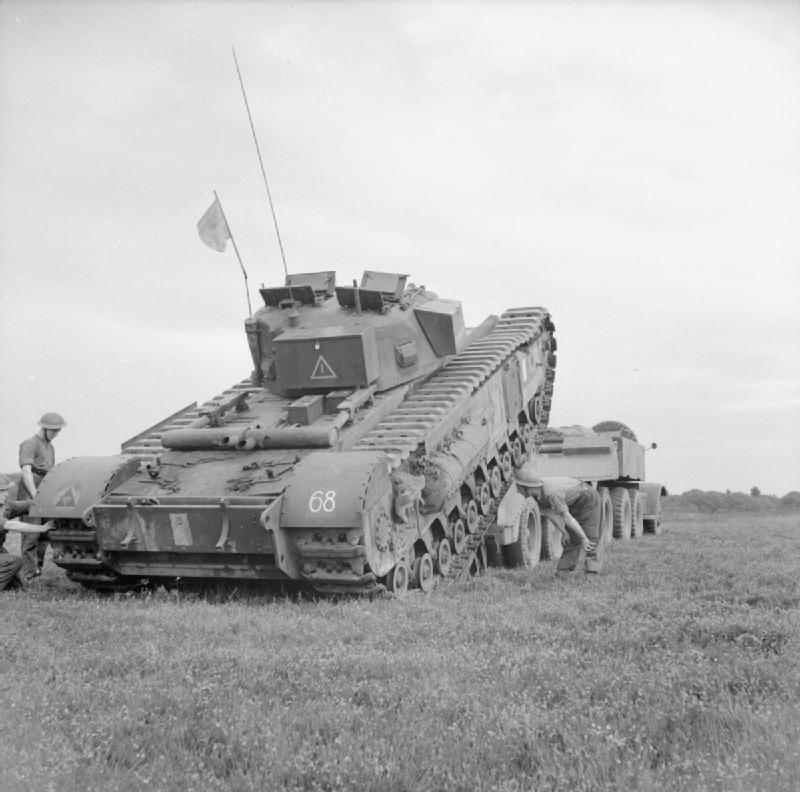
Churchill tank of 144th Regiment Royal Armoured Corps being hauled onto a tank transporter at Burleigh in Hampshire, August 1942.

The regiment trained in the infantry tank ('I' tank) role on Churchill tanks, and in the winter of 1942–43 was mobilised for the Allied invasion of Sicily. But the orders were changed, 144 RAC had to hand its Churchills over to a Canadian regiment, and was re-equipped instead with Sherman tanks. The following autumn it reverted to Churchills, then finally, in the winter of 1943–44, it was converted back to Shermans for the Normandy landings. The training was also broadened and 33rd Tank Brigade was redesignated 33rd Armoured Brigade. The plan was still for it to land in the infantry tank role, supporting 49th (West Riding) Infantry Division, but if one of the armoured divisions suffered heavy casualties, 33rd would be ready to switch roles and replace its armoured brigade. It was therefore equipped with a proportion of Sherman Firefly tanks armed with the 17-pounder, and the tank gunners practised with this weapon at Holkham Field Firing Range. Lieutenant Colonel A. Jolly, Royal Tank Regiment, (later General Sir Alan Jolly), took command on 10 April 1944.

== North-West Europe 1944–45 ==
Elements of the 144th landed as early as 8 June 1944, they used Crusader Tanks with twin Oerlikons acting as infantry support for the 51st Highlanders. 144th Regiment RAC began to land in Normandy on 14 June 1944 and went into 'harbour' near Bayeux. 33rd Armoured Brigade had been delayed in landing, and its absence was sorely felt by the British Second Army during the tough fighting around Villers-Bocage (13–16 June).

As an independent brigade under GHQ, 33rd Armoured could be assigned to support any infantry division that required the assistance of tanks, it was usually split up, the regiments forming Brigade groups with the infantry, with squadrons assigned to support individual battalions. During June and July 1944 the brigade moved between 49th (West Riding) Division, British I Corps and First Canadian Army as required.

=== Operation Pomegranate ===
Apart from reconnaissance on 8 July, in which the regiment captured some prisoners, 144 RAC's first action was during Operation Pomegranate, supporting the 59th (Staffordshire) Infantry Division in an attack on Noyers. This was a deliberate infantry assault preceded by an artillery barrage, with the tanks of 144 RAC in close support, assisted by flail tanks, Churchill AVREs with petard mortars, and Churchill Crocodile flamethrower tanks, all from 79th Armoured Division, which operated 21st Army Group's specialist armour.

The advance was badly hampered by minefields (both Allied and German), and 144 RAC had 20 tanks disabled, mostly by 'friendly' mines. This seriously reduced the force that could be used. The Official History records that 'Noyers was attacked again and again' for two days, but the garrison drawn from the 277th Infantry Division held out, except around the station and Point 126, which was taken at bayonet point by 'A' Company, 2/6th Battalion, South Staffordshire Regiment (part of 177th Brigade of 59th (Staffordshire) Division) following 'A' Squadron 144 RAC.

In three days' fighting, 144 RAC lost 13 officers and other ranks killed, 9 missing, and 61 wounded. In addition to the tanks disabled by mines, it had five tanks 'brewed up', one written off and 11 damaged or ditched, as well as a scout car and a half-track lost. Lt-Col Jolly wrote a detailed report after the battle to highlight the tactical lessons learned. He commented that 144 RAC's earlier 'I' tank training had proved useful, even though it was now equipped with Shermans. Jolly became regarded as a good tactician, and infantry commanders bowed to his tactical judgement when planning joint operations.

After Noyers, the regiment received a much-needed draft of replacements from 148 RAC, which was being disbanded.

=== Operation Astonia ===
From 3 August until 14 September, 33rd Armoured Brigade was attached to 51st (Highland) Infantry Division. (Note: 144th Regt RAC was briefly attached to 31st Tank Brigade in I Corps, 23–31 August 1944.) From 16 August 144 RAC regularly worked with 153rd (Highland) Brigade of 51st Highland. 'On arriving at Brigade Headquarters, Major Secretan found that he was to support the 1st Gordons, the beginning of a long association between B Squadron and that battalion ... this was really the beginning of our close connection with 153 Infantry Brigade, an association which was to continue for the remainder of the campaign. Each infantry battalion also grew accustomed to being supported by the same squadron and in this way very close ties of confidence and friendship were established between A Squadron and the 5th Black Watch, B squadron and the 1st Gordons, and between C Squadron and the 5/7th Gordons ... In order to make us feel part of the family, the 51st Highland Division asked us to wear the famous HD flash and issued every man in the brigade with one, a gesture which was very much appreciated'.

On 8 September 144 RAC supported 153 Brigade in the assault on the German-held French port of Le Havre (Operation Astonia). This involved clearing minefields and crossing an anti-tank ditch. For this operation, 144 RAC had under command the Sherman Crab flail tanks of C Squadron, 1st Lothians and Border Horse and tanks to lay scissors bridges. This operation was successful.

=== New role ===
In January 1945, 144 RAC operated with 53rd (Welsh) Infantry Division in the British counter-attacks against the northern side of the 'Bulge' developed by the German Ardennes offensive. Then, on 18 January, 33rd Armd Brigade became part of 79th Armoured Division; from 30 January, 144 RAC re-equipped with Buffalo LVT amphibious vehicles to begin training for the assault crossing of the Rhine.

Major Martin Lindsay, second-in-command of 1st Battalion Gordon Highlanders, wrote: 'We had a party for Bob Secretan and his officers. It was a sad occasion for they [144 RAC] were giving up their Sherman tanks to be converted into an amphibious regiment. We had had this squadron supporting us on most of our operations since Normandy, and could not have wished for a better. They looked on themselves as being almost Gordon Highlanders'. (By contrast, 1st Gordons was supported in its next operation by a troop of Churchill tanks from 107 RAC, whose performance Lindsay described as 'The windiest and wettest imaginable').

== New identity ==
On 1 March 1945, 144 RAC was redesignated 4th Royal Tank Regiment to replace the original 4 RTR, which had been captured at Tobruk in the North African Campaign in 1942. It happened that the band of the East Lancashire Regiment was touring the NW Europe theatre, so they played the regimental march for the final parade of 144 RAC on 28 February, to mark the original link with the 8th Battalion, East Lancashire Regiment. The first parade of the new regiment the following day was inspected by Sir John Crocker, commander of I Corps and the most senior RTR officer in the theatre. The RTR band played the regimental march, My Boy Willie and each man wore a new black beret and RTR badge, specially sent from England by the Director, RAC. They also adopted the blue shoulder flash of 4 RTR.

Under its new title, the regiment took part in Operation Plunder, ferrying troops of 51st (Highland) Division across the River Rhine on the night of 23/24 March 1945. On landing, Lt-Col Jolly planted the World War I standard of the original 4th RTR (D Battalion Tank Corps) on the far bank.

4 RTR continued postwar as a regular regiment of the British Army.

== Commanding officers ==
- Lieutenant-Colonel Stuart James, DSO, (East Lancashire Regiment) 22 November 1941 – 9 April 1944
- Lieutenant-Colonel Alan Jolly, DSO, (Royal Tank Regiment) 10 April 1944 – 28 February 1945

== See also ==
- Michael Wittmann
