= 33rd Armoured Brigade =

- Formation Insignia of the 33rd Armoured Brigade
- Active: 17 March 1944 - 22 August 1945; 1 January 1980 - 1 December 1992
- Country: United Kingdom
- Branch: British Army
- Type: Armoured
- Size: Brigade
- Part of: Independent Brigade; 79th Armoured Division; 3rd Armoured Division; 4th Armoured Division
- Garrison/HQ: Alanbrooke Barracks, Paderborn Garrison
- Equipment: M4 Sherman; LVT 4
- Engagements: Second World War; Invasion of Normandy; Le Mesnil-Patry; Operation Charnwood; Operation Pomegranate; Operation Totalize; Rhine Crossing

The 33rd Armoured Brigade (33rd Armd Bde) was an armoured brigade of the British Army that was active in northwestern Europe in the Second World War from June 1944 until May 1945 and from 1980 to 1992.

== History ==
=== Normandy ===
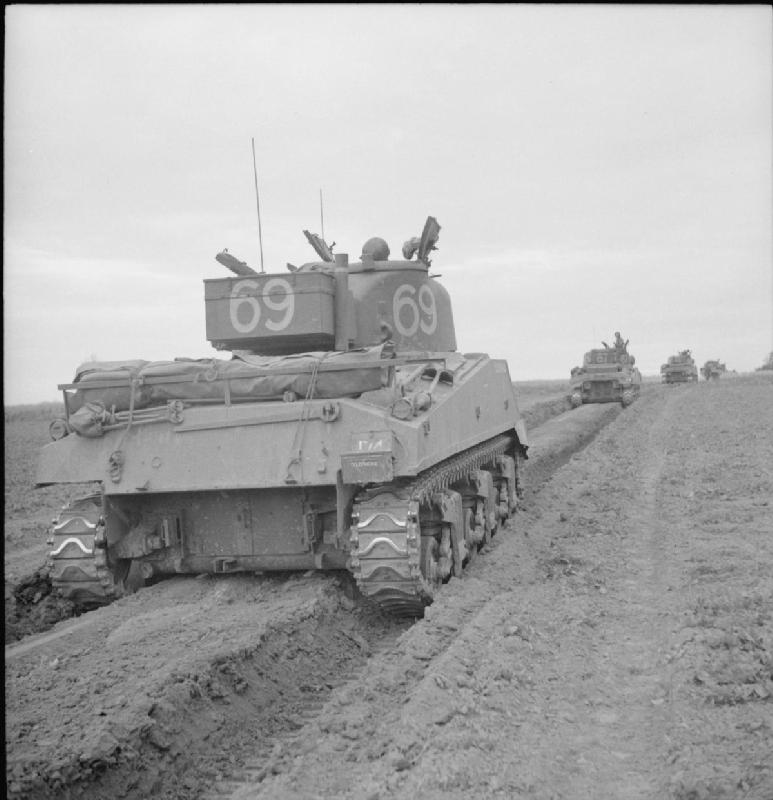
Shermans of the 33rd Armoured Brigade during Operation Charnwood.

The brigade was formed in the United Kingdom on 17 March 1944 by the re-naming of the 33rd Tank Brigade. The brigade took part in the Normandy campaign and landed on Gold Beach on 6 June 1944. The brigade, consisting of three armoured regiments, was assigned to infantry divisions that needed armoured support and rarely fought as a unit.

The brigade took part in the Battle for Caen. On 11 June, the brigade took part in fighting at Le Mesnil-Patry. From 8 to 9 July, the brigade participated in Operation Charnwood; the capture of Caen north of the Orne. On 16 July, attached to the 59th (Staffordshire) Infantry Division, the brigade took part in Operation Pomegranate, part of the Second Battle of the Odon, to divert German attention from Operation Goodwood. Following the Battle for Caen, the brigade took part with the First Canadian Army attacks towards Falaise; on 8 August, the brigade took part in Operation Totalize.

=== Rhine Crossing ===
The brigade was reformed and re-equipped with LVT 4 (Buffalo amphibious armoured fighting vehicles) for Operation Plunder, the Rhine crossing, and was placed under the command of the 79th Armoured Division.

=== Post War ===
During the 1970s, the brigade was one of two "square" brigades assigned to 3rd Armoured Division. After being briefly converted to "Task Force Echo" in the late 1970s, the brigade was reinstated in 1981, assigned to 4th Armoured Division and based at Alanbrooke Barracks in Paderborn. In 1986, it was assigned to 3 (UK) Armd Div. Following the fall of the Berlin Wall, in December 1992, the brigade was merged with the 20th Armoured Brigade and disbanded as part of the Options for Change programme.

== Organisation ==
The Organisation of the brigade at certain times included:

=== Second World War ===
- Brigade Headquarters & Signal Squadron, Royal Corps of Signals
- 1st Northamptonshire Yeomanry (Dragoons), 17/3/44–18/8/45
- 1st East Riding of Yorkshire Yeomanry (Lancers), 16/8/44–23/4/45
- The Queen's Own Staffordshire Yeomanry Regiment (Hussars), 26/4/45–26/6/45
- 4th Royal Tank Regiment, 1/3/45–30/3/45
- 11th Royal Tank Regiment, 28/1/45–30/3/45 and 26/4/35–19/8/45
- 144th (8th Battalion East Lancashire) Regiment, Royal Armoured Corps, 17/3/44–28/3/45
- 148th (9th Battalion Royal North Lancashire Regiment) Regiment, Royal Armoured Corps, 17/3/44–16/8/44

=== Cold War ===
- Brigade Headquarters & 202 Signal Squadron, Royal Corps of Signals
- Royal Scots Dragoon Guards, 1/1/1980–11/1986
  - Blues and Royals, 11/1986–1/1990
  - Life Guards, 1/1990–19/8/92
- 1st Battalion, The Royal Highland Fusiliers(Princess Margaret's Own Glasgow and Ayrshire Regiment), 1/1/1980–11/1984
  - 1st Battalion, The Queen's Lancashire Regiment, 11/1984–2/1990
  - 3rd Battalion, The Light Infantry, 2/1990–1/12/1992
- 1st Battalion, The Black Watch (Royal Highland Regiment), 1/1/1980–3/1985
  - 1st Battalion, The Royal Scots (The Royal Regiment), 3/1985–12/1988
  - 1st Battalion, The Queen's Own Highlanders (Seaforth and Camerons), 12/1988–3/1990

== See also ==
- British Armoured formations of World War II
- List of British brigades of the Second World War

== Sources ==
- Poulsen, Niels Bo (2011). Coalition Warfare: An Anthology of Scholarly Presentations at the Conference on Coalition Warfare at the Danish Defence College. Cambridge Scholars. ISBN 9781443850162.
- Cole, Howard (1973). Formation Badges of World War 2. Britain, Commonwealth and Empire. London: Arms and Armour Press.
