= Battle of Berlin order of battle =

Major WW2 event

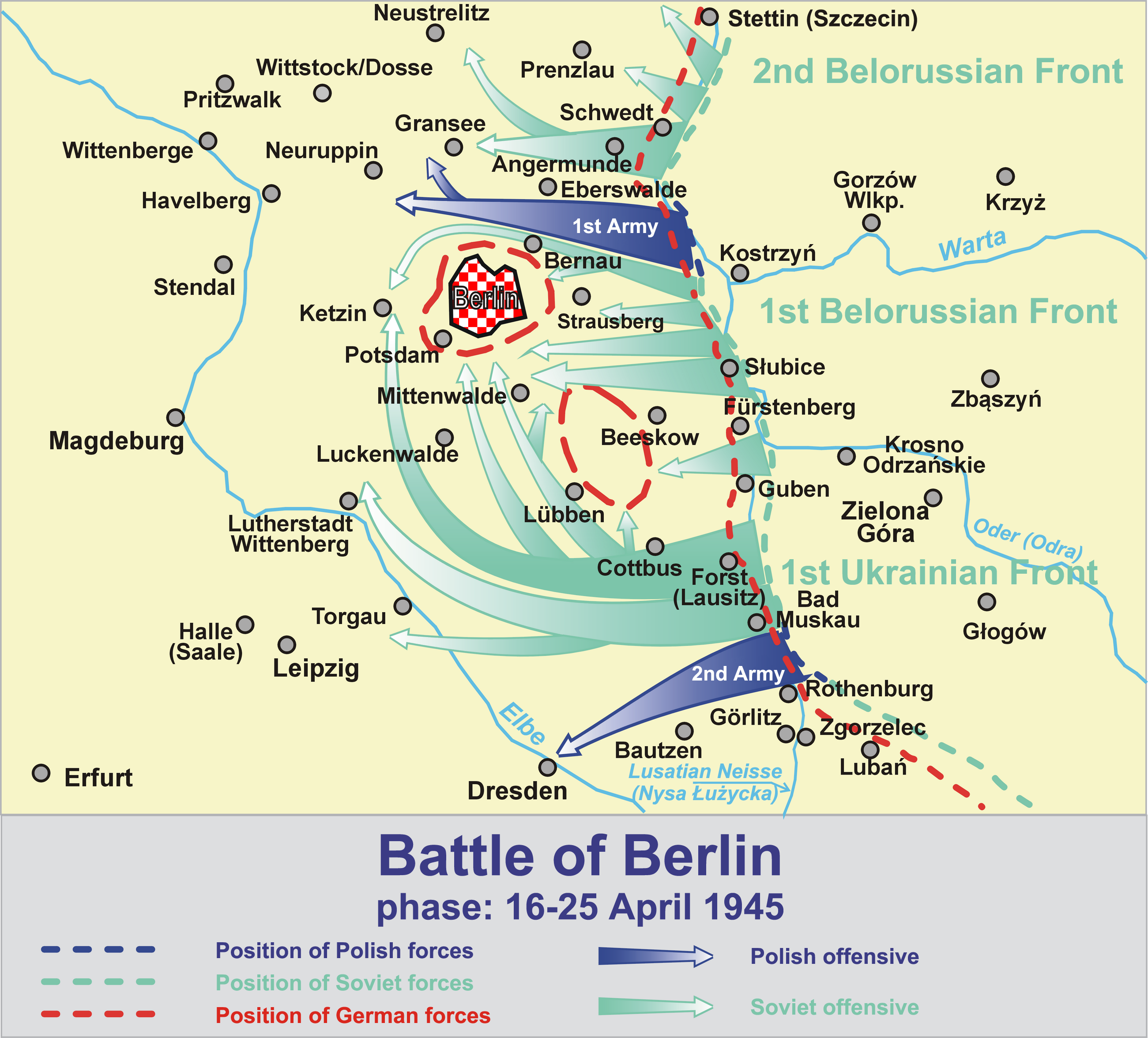
Berlin operation

The Battle of Berlin was the final major campaign of the European Theatre of World War II, fought between Nazi Germany's Wehrmacht and the Soviet Union's Red Army. It began with the Battle of the Seelow Heights on 16 April 1945 and concluded with the Battle in Berlin.

Units are listed as they were deployed from North to South on 16 April.

== Northern Sector ==
=== German forces ===
Order of battle on April 16
Army	Commander	Corps	Divisions
3rd Panzer Army	General der Panzertruppe Hasso von Manteuffel	Swinemünde Corps	402nd Infantry Div.
3rd Panzer Army	General der Panzertruppe Hasso von Manteuffel	Swinemünde Corps	2nd Marine Div.
3rd Panzer Army	General der Panzertruppe Hasso von Manteuffel	XXXII Corps	Voigt Infantry Div.
3rd Panzer Army	General der Panzertruppe Hasso von Manteuffel	XXXII Corps	549th Volksgrenadier Div.
3rd Panzer Army	General der Panzertruppe Hasso von Manteuffel	XXXII Corps	Stettin Garrison
3rd Panzer Army	General der Panzertruppe Hasso von Manteuffel	XXXII Corps	281st Infantry Div.
3rd Panzer Army	General der Panzertruppe Hasso von Manteuffel	Oder Corps	610th Infantry Div.
3rd Panzer Army	General der Panzertruppe Hasso von Manteuffel	Oder Corps	Klossek Infantry Div.
3rd Panzer Army	General der Panzertruppe Hasso von Manteuffel	XXXXVI Panzer Corps	547th Volksgrenadier Div.
3rd Panzer Army	General der Panzertruppe Hasso von Manteuffel	XXXXVI Panzer Corps	1st Marine Division

==== 3rd Panzer Army ====
===== Swinemünde Corps =====
(General of Infantry Ansat)

2nd Marine Division
402nd Naval Division (Note: Known as 402 Ausbildung Division)
522nd Grenadier Training Regiment Stab

27/172 Füsilier Training Battalion Rostock
94th Grenadier Training Battalion Rostock
4/222 Grenadier Training Battalion Rostock
48/374 Grenadier Training Battalion Neubrandenburg
89/368 Grenadier Training Battalion Schwerin

85th Hungarian Regiment Stab

Hungarian infantry school Várpalota

Brigade Kopp

Alarm Regiment 4
Alarm Regiment 5

Stab Artillery Training Regiment 2 Schwerin

257th Artillery Ausbildung Battalion
12/32 Artillery Battalion
38/2 Artillery Battalion Schwerin

22nd Flak Training Battalion

===== XXXII Corps =====
General of Infantry Friedrich-August Schack

1st Panzerjägd Battalion
Kampfgruppe Voigt

Volkssturm Battalion 244
Volkssturm Battalion 26/50
Volkssturm Battalion 26/52
Volkssturm Battalion 26/62

281st Infantry Division

379th Regiment (I. Battalion)
1098th Regiment (I. & II. battalions)
Battalion Creuz
Volkssturm Battalion Hessen Nassau
One Fortress Alarm Battalion

549th Volksgrenadier Division

1097th Grenadier Regiment (I. & II. battalions)
1099th Grenadier Regiment (I. & II. battalions)
1549th Artillery Regiment (I. to IV. Battalions)
1549th Pioneer Battalion
549th Replacement Battalion
549th Füsilier Battalion
549th Panzerjäger Battalion (3 companies)
929th Heeres Artillery Battalion (2 heavy batteries with 2 guns each)
3rd Flak Regiment

605th Heavy Flak Battalion (6 batteries)
325th Heavy Flak Battalion (7 batteries)
474th Heavy Flak Battalion (8./616 Flak Battalion - 10.5 cm x 8 guns)
437th Heavy Flak Battalion (6 batteries)

Regiment Pommern 4 (II. & III. battalions)
Marine Alarm Battalion
Recce battalion of the 4th SS Polizei Panzergrenadier Division
One battalion of 5th Jäger Division
One Hitler Youth Battalion
Volkssturm Battalion 26/11
Volkssturm Battalion 26/29
Volkssturm Battalion 26/70

SS Latvian Feldersatz Depot

SS Latvian Grenadier Regiment 1 (I.-IV. Battalions) - detached in Swinemünde
SS Latvian Grenadier Regiment 2 (I.-IV. Battalions, IV. Battalion with only 72 men)
SS Latvian Grenadier Regiment 3 (I.-III. Battalions)

===== Fortress Stettin =====
418th Grenadier Regiment (I. & II. Battalions) from 281st Security Division
281st Füsilier Battalion from 281st Security Division
1st Fortress Infantry Regiment (I. & II. Battalion) former 43rd Fortress Regiment (with 1453rd & 1454th Fortress battalions)
2nd Fortress Infantry Regiment (I. & II. Battalion) former 44th Fortress Regiment (with 1455th & 1457th Fortress battalions)
3rd Fortress Infantry Regiment (I. & II. Battalion) former Over & Roy Alarm battalions
4th Fortress Infantry Regiment (I. & II. Battalion) former Benner & Laase Alarm battalions
5th Fortress Infantry Regiment (I. & II. Battalion) former 1st Marine Infantry Battalion & Feldersatz Battalion + police company
85th Fortress M.G. Battalion
Stettin A Fortress M.G. Battalion
Fortress Pioneer Battalion
3132nd Artillery Regiment (II. (3., 4., 7., 8. batteries every one with 5 x 7.62 cm (Russian)) & III. (9.& 10. batteries every one with 4 x 15 cm & 11. & 12. batteries, every one with 6 x 7.62 cm (Russian)) battalions)

3156th Fortress Flak Battalion (3147th (6 x 10,5 cm (French)) & 3148th (6 x 12,2 cm (Russian) Fortress Flak batteries)
3158th Fortress Flak Battalion (1., 2. & 3. Batteries every one with 4 x 15,2 cm (Russian))

VIII Fortress Pak Regiment

XVI Fortress Pak Verband (comp. 4, 7, 8, 10)
XXVII Fortress Pak Verband (comp. 1-6, 8 & 10)

725th Pioneer Battalion (4 companies)
555th z.v.B. Pioneer Regiment

Fire security Battalion (3 companies)
96th Pioneer Battalion (4 companies)
254th Pioneer Battalion (3 companies)
IV/ Waffen SS Grenadier Regiment (3 companies)

===== Oder Corps =====
Obergruppenführer Erich von dem Bach-Zelewski

Fs E. u. A. Regiment 1
284th Sturmgeschütze Brigade

Infantry Group Klossek

1604th (Russian) Regiment (2 battalions)
89/IV Hungarian Battalion
Volkssturm Battalion Genssen
One Battalion F.A. Oder
II./3 SS Regiment

610th Infantry Division

1. SS Police Brigade (Note: I./SS Pol. Regiment 50 + I.(Hungarian), II., III./SS Pol. Regiment 8 + SS Ersatz Battalion 9 with only 2 companies)
Volkssturm Battalion Hamburg
Volkssturm Battalion Brandenburg
Volkssturm Battalion

=== Soviet forces ===
- 2nd Belorussian Front (Marshal Konstantin Rokossovsky)
  - 2nd Shock Army (Colonel General Ivan Fedyuninsky)
    - 98th Rifle Corps (RC)
      - 142nd Rifle Division (RD)
      - 281st RD
      - 381st RD
    - 108th RC
      - 46th RD
      - 90th RD
      - 372nd RD
    - 116th RC
      - 86th RD
      - 321st RD
      - 326th RD
      - 161st Fortified Region
    - 8th Guards Tank Corps
      - 58th Guards Tank Brigade
      - 59th Guards Tank Brigade
      - 60th Guards Tank Brigade
      - 28th Guards Motorized Rifle Brigade
  - 65th Army (Colonel General Pavel Batov)
    - 18th RC
      - 15th RD
      - 37th Guards RD
      - 69th RD
    - 46th RC
      - 108th RD
      - 186th RD
      - 413th RD
    - 105th RC
      - 44th Guards RD
      - 193rd RD
      - 354th RD
  - 70th Army (Colonel General Vasily Popov)
    - 47th RC
      - 71st RD
      - 136th RD
      - 162nd RD
    - 96th RC
      - 1st RD
      - 38th Guards RD
      - 165th RD
    - 114th RC
      - 76th Guards RD
      - 160th RD
      - 300th RD
  - 49th Army (Colonel General Ivan Grishin)
    - 70th RC
      - 139th RD
      - 238th RD
    - 121st RC
      - 42nd RD
      - 199th RD
      - 380th RD
  - 19th Army (Colonel General Vladimir Romanovsky)
    - 40th Guards RC
      - 10th Guards RD
      - 101st Guards RD
      - 102nd Guards RD
    - 132nd RC
      - 18th RD
      - 27th RD
      - 313th RD
    - 134th RC
      - 205th RD
      - 272nd RD
      - 310th RD
    - 3rd Artillery Corps
      - 1st Artillery Division
      - 18th Machine Gun Artillery Division
  - 5th Guards Tank Army (Colonel General Vasily Volsky)
    - 29th Tank Corps
      - 53rd Motorized Rifle Brigade
      - 25th Tank Brigade
      - 31st Tank Brigade
      - 32nd Tank Brigade
  - Front Reserve
    - 3rd Guards Cavalry Corps
      - 5th Guards Cavalry Division
      - 6th Guards Cavalry Division
      - 32nd Cavalry Division
      - 26th Artillery Division
    - 1st Guards Tank Corps
      - 1st Guards Motorized Rifle Brigade
      - 15th Guards Tank Brigade
      - 16th Guards Tank Brigade
      - 17th Guards Tank Brigade
    - 3rd Guards Tank Corps
      - 2nd Guards Motorized Rifle Brigade
      - 3rd Guards Tank Brigade
      - 18th Guards Tank Brigade
      - 19th Guards Tank Brigade
    - 8th Motorized Corps
      - 66th Motorized Rifle Brigade
      - 67th Motorized Rifle Brigade
      - 68th Motorized Rifle Brigade
      - 116th Tank Brigade

== Center Sector ==
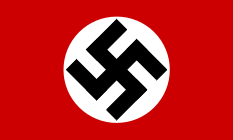

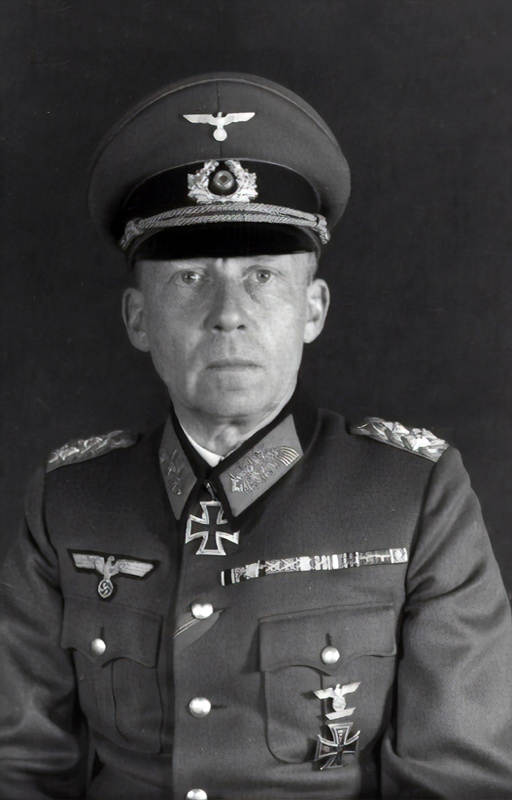
Gotthard Heinrici

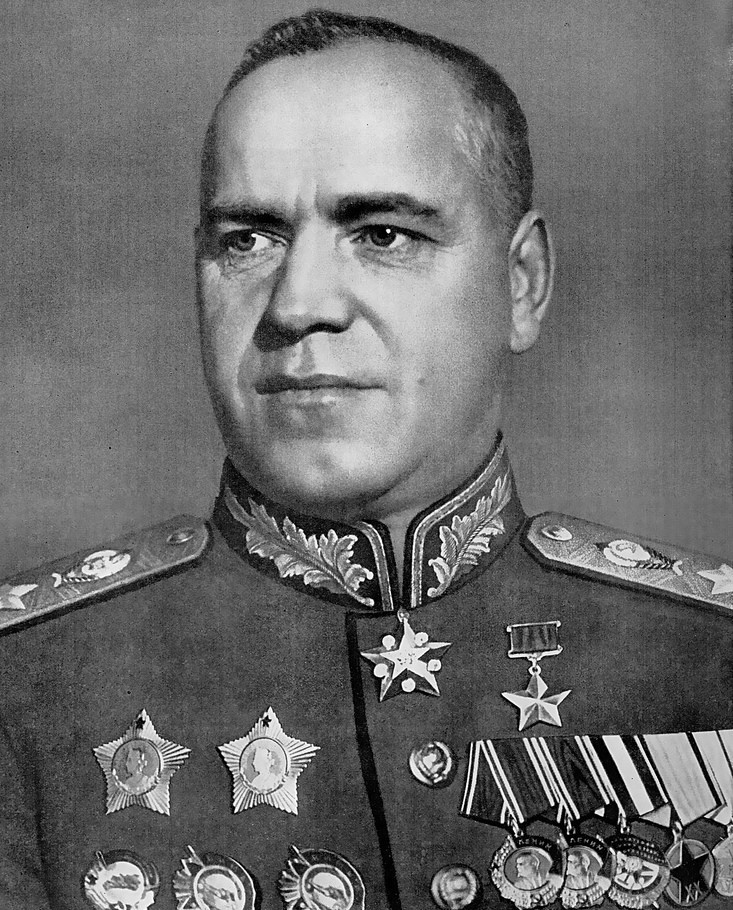
Georgi Zhukov

=== Army Group Vistula ===
Colonel General Gotthard Heinrici

==== Ninth Army ====
General of Infantry Theodor Busse

Sturm Battalion AOK
Hitlerjugend Nahkampf Brigade (I. to IV. Battalions each w 4 companies).

CI Corps
General of Artillery Wilhelm Berlin

406th Volksartilleriekorps (I. to V. Battalions II. & IV. each w 2 companies, the others w 3 companies)
111th Sturmgeschütz Lehr-Brigade
Parachute Panzerjägd Brigade "Pirat" (from 541st Volksgrenadier Division)
15th Schweres werfer Regiment (II. Battalion (3 companies - each 6 x 15 cm))
53rd Flak Regiment (336th Battalion - 7/751 (2 x 8,8 cm), 1/185 (4 x 10,5 cm), 4/336 (4 x 10,5 cm), 2/336 (4 x 10,5), RAD 3/785 (3 x 10,5 cm), 1/339 (6 x 8,8cm + 3 x 2cm), 1/876 (3 x 3,7 cm), RAR (6 x 3,7 cm), FKT (3 x 3,7 cm) 2/871 (15 x 3,7 cm)) I./13 Battalion - 8 companies, 402nd Battalion - 10 companies)
182nd Flak Regiment (I./19 Battalion (3 companies 4 x 8,8 cm + 3 x 2 cm + 1 company 12 x 3,7 + 12 x 2 cm), I./54 Battalion (4 companies 4 x 8,8 cm + 3 x 2 cm + 1 company 12 x ? cm + 2 x 2 cm), leichte 87 Battalion (1 company 12 x 3,7 cm + 1 company 18 x 2 cm + 1 company ? x 2 cm )
16/69 Volkssturm Battalion
16/128 Volkssturm Battalion
4 Volkssturm companies (16/75, 16/123, 16/511, 16/67/1)
5th Jäger Division

56th Jäger regiment
75th Jäger regiment
5th Jäger artillery regiment

606th Division Stab z.b.V.

Schatten Regiment A (I. & II. Battalions + 14. Company)
Regiment Sator (battalions Bählkow, Gorny & Spandau)
Regiment Rohrde (Battalion Potsdam & Alarm? Battalion 67)
Police Landschützen Battalion Bremen (606th Füsilier Battalion? (3 companies))
606th Artillery Regiment (III. (2 light batteries - each 4 guns & 1 heavy battery with 4 guns) & IV. (2 heavy batteries each with 6 guns + 1 heavy battery 5 x 15,2 (Russian guns))
1606th Panzerjäger company (7 PaK 75 mm)

3rd Panzer A. u. E. Battalion (3 companies - armored cars)
309th Berlin Infantry Division
Wachregiment GrossDeutschland (I. & II. Battalions + 13. & 14. companies)
652nd Grenadier Regiment (I. & II. Battalions)
653rd Grenadier Regiment (I. & II. Battalions)
309th Artillery Regiment (I. (1-3 companies with 3,4 & 4 10,5 cm), I./301 (1-3 companies each 4 x 8,8 cm + 3 x 2 cm), III./707 (1-2 companies each 4 x 8,8 cm + 3 x 2 cm), IV./234 (10-11 & IV (bod) companies each 4 x 15 cm))
309th Pioneer Battalion (3 companies (one of them motorised))
309th Panzerjäger Battalion (3 companies - with 12 PaK 75mm & 10/8 ready StuG III)
1234th Fhj Regiment "Potsdam" (I. & II. Battalions)
16./1129th PanzerJägd Battalion (from Kurmark Division) with 15/10 ready Jägpanzer 38.
4 Volkssturm Battalion (Alarm battalions Brandenburg, 323rd Potsdam, Spandau, 338th z.b.V.)
25th Panzergrenadier Division
5th Panzer Battalion
35th Panzergrenadier Regiment (I. to III. Battalions)
119th Panzergrenadier Regiment (I. (Half-tracks) & II. & III. Battalions)
25th Pioneer Battalion (5 companies)
25th Panzerjäger Battalion
125th Reconnaissance Battalion
292nd Heeres Flak Battalion
25th Panzergrenadier Artillery Regiment (I. (3 batteries - every one with 5 x 10,5 cm), II. (3 batteries - with 5,6 & 5 guns x 10,5 cm & III. (1 battery 4 x 10,5 cm, 2 batteries 5 x 15 cm) Battalions)
Kampfgruppe 1001 Nights

LVI Panzer Corps
General of Artillery Helmuth Weidling

Heeres 920th StuG Lehr Brigade

9th Fallschirmjäger Division

25th Parachute Regiment (I. & III. Battalions)
26th Parachute Regiment (I. & III. Battalions)
9th Parachute Artillery Regiment (I. to III. Battalions)
9th Parachute Rocket battalion (3 companies)
9th Parachute Pioneer battalion (3 companies)

18th Panzergrenadier Division (Note: Originally with OKW)
118th Panzer Battalion
30th Panzergrenadier Regiment (mot) (I., II., III. Battalions)
51st Panzergrenadier Regiment (mot)
18th Artillery Regiment (mot) (I., II., III. Battalions)
118th Reconnaissance Battalion
20th Panzergrenadier Division

8th Panzer Battalion
76th Panzergrenadier Regiment (3 battalions)
90th Panzergrenadier Regiment (3 battalions)
20th artillery regiment (3 battalions)

Müncheberg Panzer Division

Panzer Battalion Müncheberg (3 companies)
1st Panzergrenadier Regiment Müncheberg (I. & II. Battalions)
2nd Panzergrenadier Regiment Müncheberg (I. & II. Battalions)
Panzerjäger company Müncheberg
Panzerpioneer company Müncheberg
Artillery Regiment Müncheberg (I. Battalion (3 companies each with 6 guns), II. (Flak Battalion) (2 batteries each 4 x 8,8 cm + 1 battery 4 x 3,7 cm))

XI SS Panzer Corps
Obergruppenführer Matthias Kleinheisterkamp

404th Volksartillerie Corps

(I.(1-3 batteries), II.(4-6 batteries), III.(7-9 batteries), IV.(10-11 batteries), V.(12-13 batteries), VI.(14-16 batteries)

1240th Fhj Regiment (I. & II. battalions)
303rd ‘Döberitz’ Infantry Division
300th Grenadier Regiment (I. & II. Battalions)
301st Grenadier Regiment (I. & II. Battalions)
302nd Grenadier Regiment (I. & II. Battalions)
303rd Artillery Regiment (I. (1-3 companies each 4 x 10,5 cm), II. (4-6 companies ? x 10,5), III. (7-9 companies each 4 x 8,8 cm/before was I./216 LW - Luftwaffe)
303rd Füsilier Battalion (3 companies)
303rd Pioneer Battalion (3 companies)
303rd Panzerjäger Battalion (3 companies - Stug III)
169th Infantry Division (9 battalions)
378th Grenadier Regiment (I. to III. Battalions)
392nd Grenadier Regiment (I. to III. Battalions)
1242nd Fhj Regiment (I. & II. Battalions + 13. & 14. companies)
230th Pioneer Battalion
230th Jagdpanzer Battalion (1. & 2. companies + 1230th Jägdpanzer company - 14 vehicles)
230th Artillery Regiment (I. to IV Battalions)
Festungs Pak Verband XXVI (6., 7. & 10. companies)
712th Infantry Division
Fhj Regiment 1239 (Wiener Neustadt) (I. & II. battalions)
Fhj Regiment 1241 (Güstrow) (I. & II. battalions)
Alarm Battalion Hauck
108th Volkssturm Battalion
Schatten Regiment B (2 Battalions)
1712th Artillery Regiment (III. (3 batteries? - each 3 x 10,5 cm?), IV. (2 batteries - each 6 x 15 cm))
Kurmark Panzergrenadier Division
Panzer Battalion Kurmark
Panzergrenadier Regiment Kurmark (I. & II. Battalions)
Artillery Battalion Kurmark (3 batteries, each with 4 guns)

Frankfurt der Oder Garrison
Generalmajor Ernst Biehler

Festungs Grenadier Regiment 1
Festungs Grenadier Regiment 2
Festungs Grenadier Regiment 3
Festungs Grenadier Regiment 4
Festungs M.G. Battalion 84 (4 companies - 1 w. every Grenadier Regiment)
Festungs KGr. 5 (Battalion size)
Festungs KGr. 6 (Festungs infantry Battalion 1449 + 1 Police company)
Festungs KGr. 7
Festungs KGr. 8
Festungs infantry Flak Battalion 829 (Part)
Festungs Pionier Sperr Battalion 952
Festungs PaK Verband XXVI (4 companies w. 39 8,8cm Pak43)
Heavy Flak Battalion 185
Heavy Flak Battalion 405
Festungs Artillery Stab 1320

Festungs Artillery Battalion 1325 (3 batteries)
Festungs Artillery Battalion 1326 (4 batteries)
Festungs Artillery Battalion 1327 (5 batteries - Before known w. number 3157)

12 Tank towers 7,5 cm
Panzer Jagd Battalion 2 (1 company)

V SS Mountain Corps
Obergruppenführer Friedrich Jeckeln

408th Volksartillerie Brigade (I.(1-3 batteries), II.(4-5 batteries), III.(7-9 batteries), IV. (10-11 batteries), V. (13-14 batteries))
15th SS Pz Jagd Company
2nd Pz Jagd Battalion(without one company)
561st SS Panzerjäger Battalion

286th Infantry Division
Regiment von Petersdorf (2 battalions)
1237th Fhj Regiment (2 battalions)
Alarm Battalion Brieskow
27/151 Volkssturn Battalion "Dresden"
7/108 Volkssturn Battalion "Mainfranken"
Volkssturn Battalion Oberdonau
verstärke Pionnier Battalion 275
32nd SS Grenadier Division
86th SS Grenadier Regiment (I. & II. Battalions)
87th SS Grenadier Regiment (I. & II. Battalions)
32nd SS Artillery Regiment (I. (2 batteries 10,5 cm x 4 guns), II. (2 batterie 10,5 cm x 4 guns), III. (1 battery 10,5 cm x 4 guns & 1 battery 15 cm x 4 guns)
Volkssturm Battalion Thüringen
391st Security Division (Note: Renamed 337 Volksgrenadier Division before 21/4/45)
1233rd Fhj Grenadier Regiment (I. to III. battalions - III. Battalion later became I./Grenadier Regiment Mueller z.b.V.)
95th Grenadier Regiment (I. & II. battalions - before designed as 62nd & 63rd Alarm Battalions)
239th Sicherungs Battalion (later became II./Grenadier Regiment Mueller z.b.V.)
Pioneer Battalion (Stab + 1. & 2. companies)
SS Sturm Battalion z.v.B.
8/16 Volkssturm Battalion
Rägener Division

SS Verband Fhr Schüle Arolsen (I. to III. Battalions)
Police Battalion Döring
Absorbed the 286th Security Division
Reserve
156th Infantry Division

1313th Grenadier Regiment (I. to III. Battalions)
1314th Grenadier Regiment (I. to III. Battalions)
1315th Grenadier Regiment (I. to III. Battalions)
1456th Artillery Regiment (I. Battalion (1.-3. batteries), II. (4.-6. batteries)
1456th Pioneer Battalion

=== 1st Belorussian Front ===
Marshal Georgy Zhukov

==== 61st Army ====
Colonel General Pavel Belov

9th Guards Rifle Corps

75th Guards Rifle Division
12th Rifle Division
415th Rifle Division

80th Rifle Corps

212th Rifle Division
234th Rifle Division
356th Rifle Division

89th Rifle Corps

23rd Rifle Division
311th Rifle Division
397th Rifle Division

==== 1st Polish Army ====
Lieutenant General Stanislav Poplavsky

Polish 1st Infantry Division
Polish 2nd Infantry Division
Polish 3rd Infantry Division
Polish 4th Infantry Division
Polish 6th Infantry Division
Polish 1st Armoured Brigade

==== 47th Army ====
Colonel General Franz Perkhorovich

77th Rifle Corps

185th Rifle Division
260th Rifle Division
328th Rifle Division

125th Rifle Corps

60th Rifle Division
76th Rifle Division
175th Rifle Division

129th Rifle Corps

82nd Rifle Division
32nd Rifle Division
143rd Rifle Division

6th Breakthrough Artillery Division

==== 3rd Shock Army ====
Colonel General Vasily Kuznetsov

7th Rifle Corps

146th Rifle Division
265th Rifle Division
365th Rifle Division

12th Guards Rifle Corps

23rd Guards Rifle Division
33rd Rifle Division
52nd Guards Rifle Division

79th Rifle Corps

150th Rifle Division
171st Rifle Division
207th Rifle Division

9th Tank Corps

8th Motorized Rifle Brigade
23rd Tank Brigade
95th Tank Brigade
108th Tank Brigade

4th Breakthrough Artillery Corps

5th Breakthrough Artillery Division

==== 5th Shock Army ====
Colonel General Nikolai Berzarin

9th Rifle Corps

230th Rifle Division
248th Rifle Division
301st Rifle Division

26th Guards Rifle Corps

89th Guards Rifle Division
94th Guards Rifle Division
266th Rifle Division

32nd Rifle Corps

60th Guards Rifle Division
295th Rifle Division
416th Rifle Division

5th Breakthrough Artillery Corps

2nd Breakthrough Artillery Division
14th Breakthrough Artillery Division

11th Guards Heavy Tank Brigade
67th Guards Heavy Tank Brigade

==== 8th Guards Army ====
Colonel General Vasily Chuikov

4th Guards Rifle Corps

35th Guards Rifle Division
47th Guards Rifle Division
57th Guards Rifle Division

28th Guards Rifle Corps

39th Guards Rifle Division
79th Guards Rifle Division
88th Guards Rifle Division

29th Guards Rifle Corps

27th Guards Rifle Division
74th Guards Rifle Division
82nd Guards Rifle Division

8th Breakthrough Artillery Corps

18th Breakthrough Artillery Division
29th Breakthrough Artillery Division

7th Guards Heavy Tank Brigade

==== 69th Army ====
Colonel General Vladimir Kolpakchi

25th Rifle Corps

4th Rifle Division
77th Guards Rifle Division

61st Rifle Corps

134th Rifle Division
246th Rifle Division
247th Rifle Division

91st Rifle Corps

41st Rifle Division
312th Rifle Division
370th Rifle Division

==== 33rd Army ====
Colonel General Vyacheslav Tsvetayev

16th Rifle Corps

323rd Rifle Division
339th Rifle Division
383rd Rifle Division

38th Rifle Corps

52nd Rifle Division
64th Rifle Division
89th Rifle Division
169th Rifle Division

62nd Rifle Corps

49th Rifle Division
222nd Rifle Division
362nd Rifle Division

2nd Guards Cavalry Corps

3rd Guards Cavalry Division
4th Guards Cavalry Division
17th Guards Cavalry Division

==== 1st Guards Tank Army ====
Colonel General Mikhail Katukov

8th Guards Mechanized Corps

19th Guards Mechanized Brigade
20th Guards Mechanized Brigade
21st Guards Mechanized Brigade
1st Guards Tank Brigade

11th Guards Tank Corps

27th Guards Mechanized Brigade
40th Guards Tank Brigade
44th Guards Tank Brigade
45th Guards Tank Brigade

11th Tank Corps

12th Motorized Rifle Brigade
20th Tank Brigade
36th Tank Brigade
65th Tank Brigade

==== 2nd Guards Tank Army ====
Colonel General Semyon Bogdanov

1st Mechanized Corps

19th Mechanized Brigade
35th Mechanized Brigade
37th Mechanized Brigade
219th Tank Brigade

9th Guards Tank Corps

33rd Guards Mechanized Brigade
47th Guards Tank Brigade
50th Guards Tank Brigade
65th Guards Tank Brigade

12th Guards Tank Corps

34th Guards Mechanized Brigade
48th Guards Tank Brigade
49th Guards Tank Brigade
66th Guards Tank Brigade

==== 3rd Army ====
Colonel General Alexander Gorbatov

35th Rifle Corps

250th Rifle Division
290th Rifle Division
348th Rifle Division

40th Rifle Corps

5th Rifle Division
129th Rifle Division

41st Rifle Corps

120th Rifle Division
269th Rifle Division

==== Detailed breakdown ====
- 1st Belorussian Front
  - 47th Army
    - 125th Rifle Corps
      - 175th Rifle Division
      - 76th Rifle Division
      - 185th Rifle Division
      - 60th Rifle Division
    - 129th Rifle Corps
      - 146th Rifle Division
      - 82nd Rifle Division
      - 132nd Rifle Division
    - 70th Independent Guard Heavy Tank Regiment
    - 334th Guards Heavy Self-propelled Artillery Regiment
    - 1204th Self-propelled Artillery Regiment
    - 1416th Self-propelled Artillery Regiment
    - 1892nd Self-propelled Artillery Regiment
    - 6th Breakthrough Artillery Division
      - 2nd Mortar Brigade
      - 10th Cannon Artillery Brigade
      - 18th Howitzer Artillery Brigade
      - 21st Light Artillery Brigade
      - 118th Heavy Howitzer Artillery Brigade
      - 124th Howitzer Artillery Brigade
    - 4th Corps Artillery Brigade
    - 74th Anti-Aircraft Artillery Division
    - 18th Engineer Brigade
  - 3rd Shock Army
    - 79th Rifle Corps
      - 150th Rifle Division
      - 171st Rifle Division
      - 207th Rifle Division
    - 12th Guards Rifle Corps
      - 23rd Guards Rifle Division
      - 33rd Rifle Division
      - 52nd Guards Rifle Division
    - 7th Rifle Corps
      - 146th Rifle Division
      - 265th Rifle Division
      - 364th Rifle Division
    - 38th Rifle Corps
      - 52nd Rifle Division
      - 64th Rifle Division
      - 89th Rifle Division
    - 9th Tank Corps
      - 23rd Tank Brigade
      - 95th Tank Brigade
      - 108th Tank Brigade
      - 8th Motorised Rifle Brigade
    - 85th Independent Tank Regiment
    - 88th Independent Guards Heavy Tank Regiment
    - 351st Guards Heavy Self-propelled Artillery Regiment
    - 1049th Self-propelled Artillery Regiment
    - 1203rd Self-propelled Artillery Regiment
    - 1455th Self-propelled Artillery Regiment
    - 1508th Self-propelled Artillery Regiment
    - 1728th Self-propelled Artillery Regiment
    - 1729th Self-propelled Artillery regiment
    - 1818th Self-propelled Artillery Regiment
    - 4th Breakthrough Artillery Corps
      - 5th Breakthrough Artillery Division
        - 1st Mortar Brigade
        - 9th Howitzer Artillery Brigade
        - 23rd Guards Light Artillery Brigade
        - 24th Cannon Artillery Brigade
        - 86th Heavy Howitzer Artillery Brigade
        - 100th Howitzer Artillery Brigade
      - 12th Breakthrough Artillery Division
        - 41st Guards Mortar Brigade
        - 89th Heavy Howitzer Artillery Brigade
        - 104th Howitzer Artillery Brigade
      - 40th Independent Tank Destroyer Artillery Brigade
      - 45th Tank Destroyer Artillery Brigade
      - 136th Army Canon Artillery Brigade
    - 5th Guards Mortar Division
      - 16th Guards Mortar Brigade
      - 22nd Guards Mortar Brigade
      - 23rd Guards Mortar Brigade
    - 19th Anti-Aircraft Artillery Division
    - 25th Engineer Brigade
  - 5th Shock Army
    - 26th Guards Rifle Corps
      - 89th Guards Rifle Division
      - 94th Guards Rifle Division
      - 266th Rifle Division
    - 32nd Rifle Corps
      - 60th Guards Rifle Division
      - 295th Rifle Division
      - 416th Rifle Division
    - 9th Rifle Corps
      - 230th Rifle Division
      - 248th Rifle Division
      - 301st Rifle Division
    - 11th Tank Corps
      - 20th Tank Brigade
      - 36th Tank Brigade
      - 65th Tank Brigade
      - 12th Motorised Rifle Brigade
    - 11th Independent Guards Heavy Tank Brigade
    - 67th Guards Heavy Tank Brigade
    - 220th Independent Tank Brigade
    - 396th Guards Heavy Self-propelled Artillery Regiment
    - 1504th Independent Self-propelled Artillery Regiment
    - 6th Breakthrough Artillery Corps
      - 2nd Breakthrough Artillery Division
        - 5th Mortar Brigade
        - 10th Guards Howitzer Artillery Brigade
        - 16th Guards Canon Artillery Brigade
        - 20th Light Artillery Brigade
        - 48th Guards Heavy Howitzer Artillery Brigade
        - 121st Howitzer Artillery Brigade
      - 14th Breakthrough Artillery Division
        - 6th Guards Mortar Brigade
        - 21st Heavy Mortar Brigade
        - 24th Mortar Brigade
        - 122nd Howitzer Artillery Brigade
        - 169th Light Artillery Brigade
        - 172nd Howitzer Artillery Brigade
        - 176th Heavy Howitzer Artillery Brigade
      - 22nd Breakthrough Artillery Division
        - 6th Heavy Mortar Brigade
        - 32nd Mortar Brigade
        - 97th Heavy Howitzer Brigade
      - 2nd Guards Mortar Brigade
      - 25th Guards Mortar Brigade
      - 35th Guards Mortar Brigade
      - 2nd Guards Anti-Aircraft Artillery Division
    - 1st Independent Guards Motorised Engineer Brigade
    - 17th Breakthrough Engineer Brigade
    - 61st Engineer Brigade
  - 8th Guards Army
    - 4th Guards Rifle Corps
      - 35th Guards Rifle Division
      - 47th Guards Rifle Division
      - 57th Guards Rifle Division
    - 29th Guards Rifle Corps
      - 27th Guards Rifle Division
      - 74th Guards Rifle Division
      - 82nd Guards Rifle Division
    - 28th Guards Rifle Corps
      - 39th Guards Rifle Division
      - 79th Guards Rifle Division
      - 88th Guards Rifle Division
    - 7th Independent Guards Heavy Tank Brigade
    - 34th Independent Guards Heavy Tank Regiment
    - 65th Independent Tank Regiment
    - 259th Independent Tank Regiment
    - 371st Guards Self-propelled Artillery Regiment
    - 394th Guards Heavy Self-propelled Artillery Regiment
    - 694th Self-propelled Artillery Regiment
    - 1026th Self-propelled Artillery Regiment
    - 1061st Self-propelled Artillery Regiment
    - 1087th Self-propelled Artillery Regiment
    - 1200th Self-propelled Artillery Regiment
    - 3rd Breakthrough Artillery Corps
      - 18th Breakthrough Artillery Division
        - 2nd Heavy Howitzer Artillery Brigade
        - 42nd Mortar Brigade
        - 58th Howitzer Artillery Brigade
        - 65th Light Artillery Brigade
        - 80th Heavy Howitzer Artillery Brigade
        - 120th Howitzer Artillery Brigade
      - 29th Breakthrough Artillery Division
        - 26th Heavy Mortar Brigade
        - 36th Guards Mortar Brigade
        - 46th Mortar Brigade
        - 182nd Light Artillery Brigade
        - 184th Howitzer Artillery Brigade
        - 186th Howitzer Artillery Brigade
        - 189th Heavy Howitzer Artillery Brigade
      - 38th Tank Destroyer Artillery Brigade
      - 43rd Army Guards Canon Artillery Brigade
    - 2nd Guards Mortar Division
      - 17th Guards Mortar Brigade
      - 20th Guards Mortar Brigade
      - 26th Guards Mortar Brigade
    - 3rd Guards Anti-Aircraft Artillery Division
    - 2nd Breakthrough Engineer Brigade
    - 7th Pontoon Bridge Brigade
    - 64th Engineer Brigade
  - 1st Guards Tank Army
    - 11th Guards Tank Corps
      - 40th Guards Tank Brigade
      - 44th Guards Tank Brigade
      - 45th Guards Tank Brigade
      - 27th Guards Motorised Rifle Brigade
    - 8th Guards Mechanised Corps
      - 19th Guards Mechanized Brigade
      - 20th Guards Mechanised Brigade
      - 21st Guards Mechanised Brigade
      - 1st Guards Tank Brigade
    - 64th Independent Guards Tank Brigade
    - 19th Self-propelled Artillery Brigade
    - 11th Independent Guards Heavy Tank Regiment
    - 48th Independent Guards Heavy Tank Regiment
    - 353rd Guards Self-propelled Artillery Regiment
    - 362nd Guards Heavy Self-propelled Artillery Regiment
    - 399th Guards Heavy Self-propelled Artillery Regiment
    - 400th Guards Self-propelled Artillery Regiment
    - 1454th Self-propelled Artillery Regiment
    - 25th Independent Tank Destroyer Artillery Brigade
    - 41st Tank Destroyer Artillery Brigade
    - 197th Light Artillery Brigade
    - 4th Guards Anti-Aircraft Artillery Division
    - 6th Pontoon Bridge Brigade
    - 17th Motorised Engineer Brigade
  - 2nd Guards Tank Army
    - 12th Guards Tank Corps
      - 48th Guards Tank Brigade
      - 49th Guards Tank Brigade
      - 34th Guards Motorised Rifle Division
      - 1st Polish Infantry Division (*)
    - 1st Mechanised Corps
      - 19th Mechanised Brigade
      - 35th Mechanised Brigade
      - 37th Mechanised Brigade
      - 219th Tank Brigade
    - 33rd Guards Motorised Rifle Brigade
    - 9th Guards Tank Corps
    - 6th Independent Guards Heavy Tank Regiment
    - 79th Independent Guards Heavy Tank Regiment
    - 75th Self-propelled Artillery Regiment
    - 347th Guards Heavy Self-propelled Artillery Regiment
    - 393rd Guards Self-propelled Artillery Regiment
    - 2nd Polish Howitzer Artillery Brigade (*)
    - 20th Tank Destroyer Artillery Brigade
    - 198th Light Artillery Brigade
    - 24th Anti-aircraft Artillery Division
    - 18th Motorised Engineer Brigade
  - 16th Air Army
    - 1st Guards Fighter Aviation Corps
      - 3rd Guards Fighter Aviation Division
      - 4th Guards Fighter Aviation Division
    - 3rd Fighter Aviation Corps
      - 265th Fighter Aviation Division
      - 278th Fighter Aviation Division
    - 3rd Bomber Aviation Corps
      - 241st Bomber Aviation Division
      - 301st Bomber Aviation Division
      - 183rd Bomber Aviation Division
    - 6th Bomber Aviation Corps
      - 113th Bomber Aviation Division
      - 326th Bomber Aviation Division
    - 6th Assault Aviation Corps
      - 197th Assault Aviation Division
      - 198th Assault Aviation Division
    - 6th Fighter Aviation Corps
      - 234th Fighter Aviation Division
      - 273rd Fighter Aviation Division
    - 9th Assault Aviation Corps
      - 3rd Guards Assault Aviation Division
      - 300th Assault Aviation Division
    - 13th Fighter Aviation Corps
      - 193rd Fighter Aviation Division
      - 283rd Fighter Aviation Division
    - 1st Guards Fighter Aviation Division
    - 2nd Guards Assault Aviation Division
    - 9th Guards Night Bomber Aviation Division
    - 11th Guards Assault Aviation Division
    - 188th Bomber Aviation Division
    - 221st Bomber Aviation Division
    - 242nd Night Bomber Aviation Division
    - 282nd Fighter Aviation Division
    - 286th Fighter Aviation Division

==== Front Reserves ====
2nd Guards Cavalry Corps

3rd Guards Cavalry Division
4th Guards Cavalry Division
17th Guards Cavalry Division

9th Tank Corps

23rd Tank Brigade
95th Tank Brigade
108th Tank Brigade
8th Motorized Brigade

== Southern Sector ==
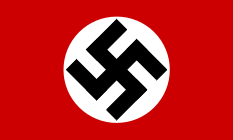

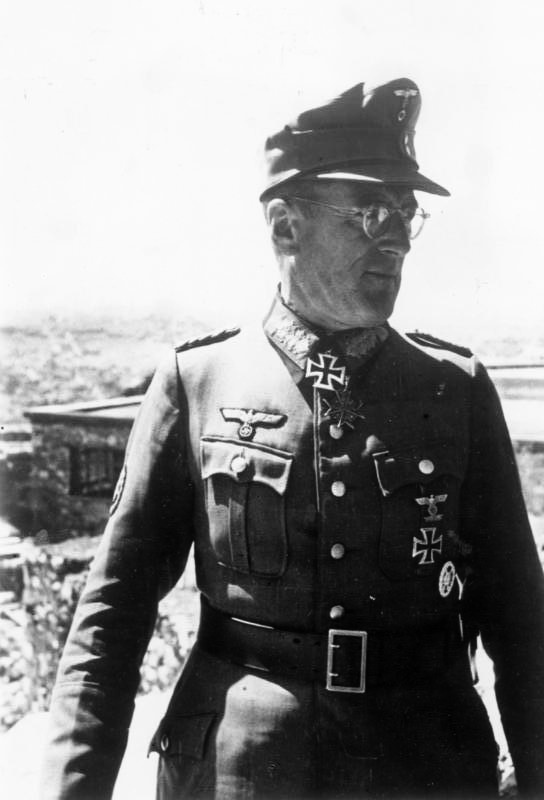
Ferdinand Schörner

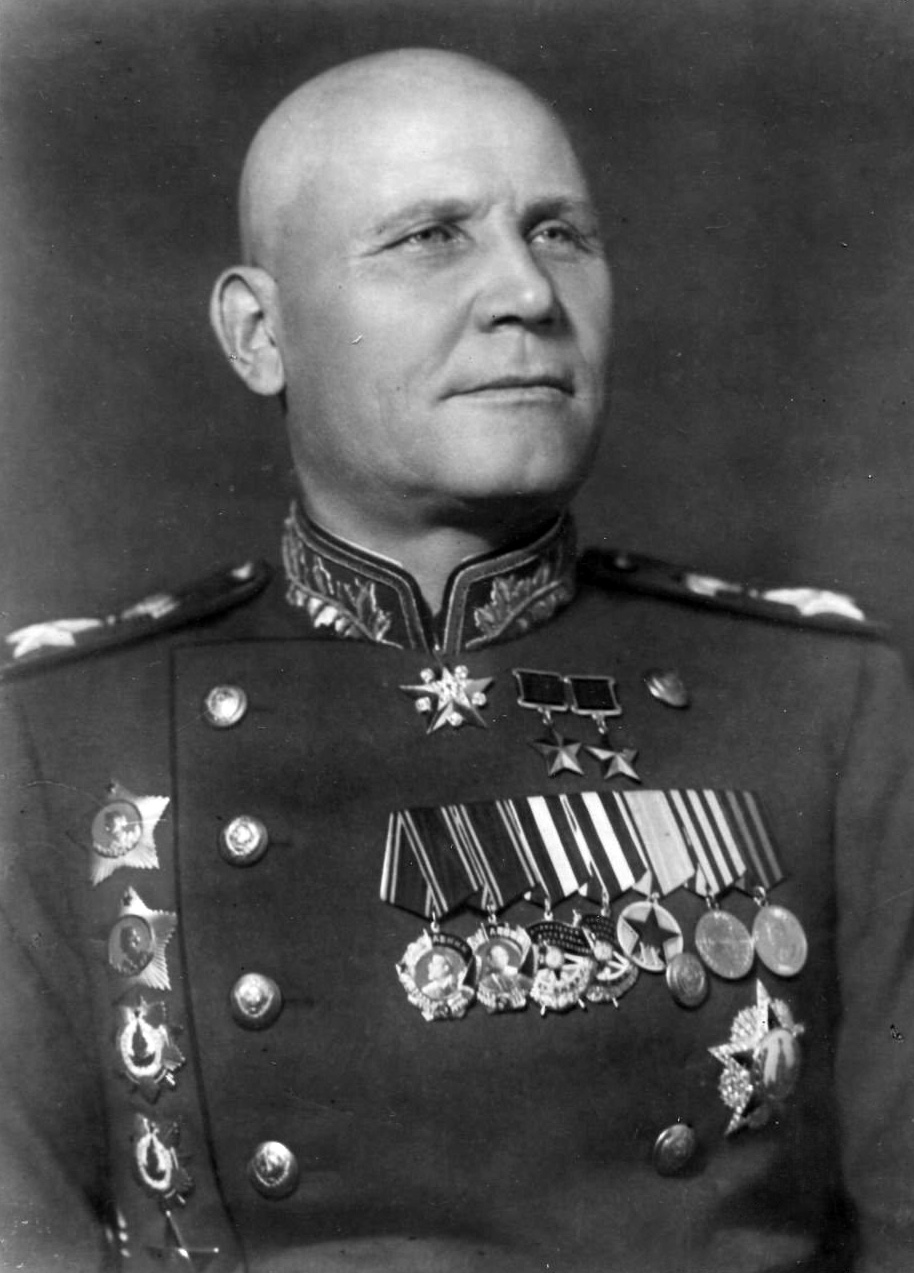
Ivan Stepanovich Konev

=== Army Group Centre ===
Feldmarshal Ferdinand Schörner

==== Fourth Panzer Army ====
General of Panzer Fritz-Hubert Gräser

(Later transferred to the 9th Army)

V Corps
General of Artillery Kurt Wäger

35th SS Police Grenadier Division

69th SS and Police Grenadier regiment
70th SS and Police Grenadier regiment
71st SS and Police Grenadier regiment
35th SS and Police Füsilier battalion
35th SS Artillery regiment
29th SS Polizei-Schützen regiment
30th SS Polizei Schutzen regiment
Ausbildung Regiment 561
Corps MG Battalion 95
Alarm Regiment 94
Alarm Regiment 97

36th SS Grenadier Division

Pz Jagd Battalion 4
681st Heavy Antitank Battalion
1244th Fj Regiment (I. & II. Battalion)
72nd Waffen SS Grenadier regiment
73rd Waffen SS Grenadier regiment
36th Füilier company
36th SS artillery battalion
Tank battalion Standort 1

275th Infantry Division
342nd Infantry Division
21st Panzer Division

==== 12th Army ====
General of Panzer Walther Wenck

XX Corps
General of Cavalry Carl-Erik Koehler

Theodor Körner RAD Infantry Division
Ulrich von Hutten Infantry Division
Ferdinand von Schill Infantry Division
Scharnhorst Infantry Division

XXXIX Panzer Corps
Lt. General Karl Arndt

12 – 21 April 1945 under OKW with the following structure:

Clausewitz Panzer Division
Schlageter RAD Division
84th Infantry Division

21 – 26 April 1945 under 12th Army with the following structure:

Clausewitz Panzer Division
84th Infantry Division
324th 'Hamburg' Reserve Infantry Division

588th Grenadier Regiment (I. & II. Battalions)
589th Grenadier Regiment (I. & II. Battalions)
324th Artillery Regiment (I. & II. Battalions)
324th Füsilier Battalion

'Meyer' Infantry Division

Möller Infantry Regiment
Heising Infantry Regiment

XXXXI Panzer Corps
Lt. General Rudolf Holste

Von Hake Infantry Division

1st Von Hake Grenadier Regiment
2nd Von Hake Grenadier Regiment

199th Infantry Division
V-Weapons Infantry Division

901st z.b.V. Artillery regiment (I. w. 1-3 comp, IV.? w. 10-11 comp.)
902nd z.b.V. Artillery regiment

XLVIII Panzer Corps
General of Panzer Maximilian von Edelsheim

14th Flak Division

90th Flak Regiment

121st Heavy Flak Battalion
568th Heavy Flak Battalion
729th Light Flak Battalion
43/IV Homeland Flak Battalion

120th Flak Regiment

307th Heavy Flak Battalion
323rd Heavy Flak Battalion
357th Heavy Flak Battalion
662nd Heavy Flak Battalion
525th E heavy Flak Battalion
80/XIII Homeland Flak Battalion

140th Flak Regiment

432nd Heavy Flak Battalion
722nd Light Flak Battalion
728th Light Flak Battalion
664th Lsp.Flak Battalion
19th Sw. EA Flak Battalion

73rd Searchlight Regiment

199th Searchlight Battalion
258th Searchlight Battalion
328th Searchlight Battalion
367th Searchlight Battalion
500th Searchlight Battalion
510th Searchlight Battalion

134th Luftnachrichten Battalion

Kampfgruppe Leipzig (Volkssturm Battalion Leipzig I. to VIII. and some flak batteries)
Kampfgruppe Halle (8 Volkssturm battalions and 1 Ersatz battalion)

==== Berlin garrison ====
- Combat group Axmann
  - HJ Department "Herbert Norkus"
- Combat group Bärenfänger
  - Guard Battalion at the Army High Command (OKH) "Greater Germany" (elements)
  - Guard Battalion "Hermann Göring" (elements)
- Combat group Krukenberg
  - 11. SS Volunteer Panzergrenadier Division “Nordland” (elements)
  - 15. Waffen-Grenadier-Division der SS (company)
  - 33. Waffen-Grenadier-Division of the SS "Charlemagne" (French Nr. 1) (~400 soldiers)
  - 101. SS Spanish Volunteer Company (~50 soldiers)
  - Caucasian Weapons Association of the SS (~20 soldiers)
- Combat group Mohnke (~1,500 soldiers)
  - 1. SS Panzer Division “Leibstandarte Adolf Hitler” (~600 soldiers)
    - SS Panzergrenadier Training and Replacement Battalion 1
  - Escort Battalion Reichsführer-SS (~600 soldiers)
    - Führer Escort Brigade (elements)
  - SS Escort Command of the Führer (elements)
  - Volkssturm Company Reich Chancellery
- Combat group Reymann
  - 1st Flak Division
  - 9th Army (elements)
    - 9. Fallschirmjäger-Division (elements)
    - 18. Panzer-Grenadier-Division (elements)
    - 20. Panzer-Grenadier-Division (elements)
- Combat group Scholz
  - Panzerjagdverband "Adolf Hitler" (elements)
  - Police Regiment Biesenthal (elements)
  - Transport Escort Battalion of the Luftwaffe 1/III (elements)
- Kampfgruppe Weidling
  - LVI Panzer Corps (elements)
  - Panzer Division “Müncheberg” (elements)
- Free Arabian Legion (~100 soldiers)
- Volkssturm

9 defensive sectors created A to H and Z "Zentrum".
Volkssturm battalions and 1st Flak Division's
batteries were assigned to these sectors.
Assignment of the batteries in Sector A to H is dated
on 15 April.

Wacht Regiment Berlin
SS Wachbataillon Reichführer SS (600 men)

Fortress regiments (Note: It seems they were formed in every defensive sector with 3 battalions.)

57th Fortress Regiment (3/121 VB as I. Battalion 3/115 VB as II. Battalion + Wehrmacht Bat + Warnholz Police Bat) - Sector Anton
58th Fortress Regiment
59th Fortress Regiment - Sector Caesar
60th Fortress Regiment (at least II.) - Sector Dora
61st Fortress Regiment
62nd Fortress Regiment (Outside Berlin with Kampgruppe Steiner)
63rd Fortress Regiment
64th Fortress Regiment
65th Fortress Regiment

1st Flak Division

126th Flak Regiment (Nord)

202nd Heavy Flak Battalion
530th Heavy Flak Battalion

5./437 (5 x 10,5cm) Dahlem Staats
7./437 (5 x 10,5cm) Eichkamp
9./212 (6 ital.) Trabrennd Ruhleben
4./605 (6) Grunewald
4./126 (5 x 10.5cm) Ruhleben
2./422 (8 ital.) Jungfernheide
3./211 (6) Blumeshof
3./126 (6 x 10,5cm) Tegel: Schiesspl.
2./215 v (4 x 41) Dreipfuhl
3./215 v (3 x 10,5cm) Sven-Hedin Strasse

123rd Heavy Flak Battalion (Turm)

1./123rd battery (4 x 12,8cm) Friedrichshain
2./123rd battery (4 x 12,8cm) Zoo
3. 123rd Battery (3 x 12,8cm) Humbolthain

733rd Light Flak Battalion

z.b.V. 6524 battery (6 x 3,7cm + 3 x 20 mm) Flh Brandenburg Briest
7./733 battery (12 x 3,7cm? + 3 x 20mm?) Flh Brandenburg Briest
1./755 battery (3 x 3,7cm + 12 x 20 mm?) Sector H

22nd Flak Regiment (Süd)

422nd Heavy Flak Battalion (List of batteries)

7./326 (ital.) in Hospital Schöneweide
9./326 in Zentralviehof
z.b.V. 10306 (RAD 4/174) in Laubenkolonie Weissensee
2./605 in Karlshorst, Pionierschule
5./326 in Trainierbahn Karlshorst
4./307 in Friedrichsfelde-Ost
6./126 (6 x 10,5 cm) in Hohenschönhausen II
7./126 (5 x 10,5 cm) in Friesdrichsfelde I
10./126 (6 x 10,5 cm) in Biesdorf

126th Heavy Flak Battalion

4./422 in Oberspree
5./126 (6 x 10,5 cm) in Schöneberg
10./326 in Treptower Park II
8./211 (RAD 4./145) in Stellung Treptower Park II
z.b.V. 10359 in Sportplatz Baumschulenweg
3./458 (4 x ?) in Tempelhofer Feld
2./326 (RAD 3./52) in Stellung Bosporusweg
5./211 (8 x ?) in Johannifer Stift
7./605 in Gradestrasse
6./307 (RAD 7./95) in Sportplatz Grenzallee

979th Light Flak Battalion

z.b.V. 14040 Battery (3 x 3,7cm 43 + 3 x 3,7cm) Sector C
z.b.V. 6524 Battery (3 x 3,7cm?) Sector C
1./733 Battery (15 x 3,7cm ZW) Schönefeld

Sector Caesar

in construction

z.B.V. 10234 in Hospital Oberschöneweide
z.b.V. 10224 in Spertplatz Herzberge
233/III in Biesdorf I

Sector Dora

5./126 in Schöneberg
5./211 in Sportplatz Lichterfelde

=== Volkssturm Battalions ===
Volkssturm battalions (Note: Up to 92 Volkssturm Battalions divided in different defensive areas.)

3/2 Volkssturm Battalion
3/3 Volkssturm Battalion
3/9 Volkssturm Battalion - Sector C
3/11 Volkssturm Battalion - Sector C
3/19 Volkssturm Battalion - Sector C
3/21 Volkssturm Battalion
3/24 Volkssturm Battalion
3/30 Volkssturm Battalion
3/36 Volkssturm Battalion
3/49 Volkssturm Battalion
3/91 Volkssturm Battalion
3/101 Volkssturm Battalion - Sector F
3/105 Volkssturm Battalion - Sector F
3/107 Volkssturm Battalion
3/109 Volkssturm Battalion - Sector F
3/110 Volkssturm Battalion
3/111 Volkssturm Battalion - Sector E
3/112 Volkssturm Battalion - Sector E
3/113 Volkssturm Battalion - Sector F
3/115 "Siemensdorf" Volkssturm Battalion - Sector A
3/119 Volkssturm Battalion
3/121 Volkssturm Battalion - Sector A
3/155 Volkssturm Battalion
3/164 Volkssturm Battalion
3/181 Volkssturm Battalion - Sector F
3/185 Volkssturm Battalion
3/191 Volkssturm Battalion
3/201 Volkssturm Battalion - Sector E
3/203 Volkssturm Battalion - Sector E
3/205 Volkssturm Battalion - Sector E
3/208 Volkssturm Battalion
16/209 Volkssturm Battalion
209 Volkssturm Battalion - Sector E
3/215 Volkssturm Battalion - Sector E
3/216 Volkssturm Battalion
268 Volkssturm Battalion
3/277 Volkssturm Battalion
3/301 Volkssturm Battalion
3/303 Volkssturm Battalion - Sector D
3/305 Volkssturm Battalion (Fought in February east of the Oder)
3/306 Volkssturm Battalion - Sector D
3/307 Volkssturm Battalion - Sector D
3/309 Volkssturm Battalion - Sector C
3/311 Volkssturm Battalion
3/312 Volkssturm Battalion
3/313 Volkssturm Battalion
3/314 Volkssturm Battalion
3/316 Volkssturm Battalion - Sector D
3/320 Hitlerjugend Volkssturm Battalion
3/355 Volkssturm Battalion
3/403 Volkssturm Battalion - Sector G
3/405 Volkssturm Battalion
3/407 Volkssturm Battalion - Sector G
3/421 Volkssturm Battalion - Sector G
3/424 Volkssturm Battalion
3/425 Volkssturm Battalion - Sector E
3/427 Volkssturm Battalion
3/511 Volkssturm Battalion - Sector C
3/513 Volkssturm Battalion
3/515 Volkssturm Battalion
3/517 Volkssturm Battalion - Sector C
3/521 Volkssturm Battalion - Sector C
3/550 Volkssturm Battalion
3/556 Volkssturm Battalion
3/569 Volkssturm Battalion - Sector G
3/603 Volkssturm Battalion - Sector G
3/607 Volkssturm Battalion - Sector F
3/609 Volkssturm Battalion - Sector F
3/611 Volkssturm Battalion - Sector G
3/615 Volkssturm Battalion (Fought in February east of the Oder)
3/617 Volkssturm Battalion - Sector G
3/628 Volkssturm Battalion
3/691 Volkssturm Battalion - Sector A
3/707 Volkssturm Battalion (Fought in February east of the Oder)
3/709 Volkssturm Battalion (Fought in February east of the Oder)
3/713 Volkssturm Battalion - Sector H
3/714 Volkssturm Battalion
3/715 Volkssturm Battalion - Treptow (Fought in February east of the Oder)
3/725 Volkssturm Battalion -
3/803 Volkssturm Battalion - Sector H
3/804 Volkssturm Battalion - Sector A
3/805 Volkssturm Battalion - Sector A
3/806 Volkssturm Battalion - Sector A
3/811 Volkssturm Battalion
3/812 Volkssturm Battalion - Sector A
3/813 Volkssturm Battalion "Hummel" - Sector A
3/815 Volkssturm Battalion - Sector A
3/817 Volkssturm Battalion - Sector A
·/869 Volkssturm Battalion - Sector H
3/885 Volkssturm Battalion - Sector A
mot 3/891 Volkssturm Battalion - Sector A
mot 3/892 Volkssturm Battalion - Sector A
mot 3/894 Volkssturm Battalion - Sector A
3/909 Volkssturm Battalion - Sector B
3/917 Volkssturm Battalion - Sector B?
3/919 Volkssturm Battalion - Sector B
3/921 Volkssturm Battalion - Treptow
3/922 Volkssturm Battalion - Treptow

Volkssturm company Reichkanzeil - Sector Z

10 "nominal" Volkssturm Pionier Battalions with 2.019 men

Abschnitt A 3 companies - 364 men
Abschnitt B 1 company - 152 men
Anschnitt C 1 company - 160 men
Abschnitt D 1 company - 130 men
Abschnitt E 4 companies - 366 men
Abschnitt F 1 company - 143 men
Abschnitt G 3 companies - 256 men
Abschnitt H 1 company - 169 men
Abschnitt Z 1 company - 205 men
Reserve 1 company - 64 men

And:

Landeschutzen Battalion 320 - Sector A
213th Sicherungs Battalion
Festungs PAK Ausbildungs- und Ersatz Einheit 101 (1. to 5. companies)
Festungs PAK Verband XXI (1. & 2. companies - at least)

==== Reinforcements directed to Berlin ====
57th French SS Battalion "Fenet" from the 33rd SS Grenadier Division
15th SS Füsilier Battalion from the 15th SS Latvian Division

==== Bautzen Garrison ====
27/32 Volkssturm Bataillon
27/33 Volksstrum Bataillon
27/34 Volkssturm Bataillon Divided between the other bataillons in April 1945
27/35 Volkssturm Bataillon Created in April 1945
27/36 Volkssturm Bataillon
27/37 Volkssturm Bataillon
27/40 NSKK Volkssturm Bataillon

==== Levies during the battle ====
Kampfgruppe Moltke (1 Begleit esquadron, 1 panzer comp. "Kummersdorf" w. 12 tanks, 1 panzerjäger comp. "Dresden" w. 6 guns and 250 soldiers) formed in Zossen on 19th April.
16/272 Volkssturm Battalion - Created on 19/04/45 in Velten (3 comp. w. 250 men)

=== 1st Ukrainian Front ===
Marshal Ivan Konev

==== 3rd Guards Army ====
Colonel General Vasily Gordov

21st Rifle Corps

58th Rifle Division
253rd Rifle Division
329th Rifle Division

76th Rifle Corps

106th Rifle Division
187th Rifle Division

120th Rifle Corps

127th Rifle Division
149th Rifle Division
197th Rifle Division

25th Tank Corps

20th Motorized Rifle Brigade
111th Tank Brigade
162nd Tank Brigade
175th Tank Brigade

==== 13th Army ====
Colonel General Nikolay Pukhov

24th Rifle Corps

121st Guards Rifle Division
395th Rifle Division

27th Rifle Corps

6th Guards Rifle Division
280th Rifle Division
350th Rifle Division

102nd Rifle Corps

117th Guards Rifle Division
147th Rifle Division
172nd Rifle Division

1st Guards Artillery Division

==== 5th Guards Army ====
Colonel General Alexey Zhadov

32nd Guards Rifle Corps

13th Guards Rifle Division
95th Guards Rifle Division
97th Guards Rifle Division

33rd Guards Rifle Corps

9th Guards Airborne Division
78th Guards Rifle Division
118th Rifle Division

34th Guards Rifle Corps

14th Guards Rifle Division
15th Guards Rifle Division
58th Guards Rifle Division

3rd Artillery Division
4th Guards Tank Corps

3rd Guards Motorized Rifle Brigade
12th Guards Tank Brigade
13th Guards Tank Brigade
14th Guards Tank Brigade

==== 2nd Polish Army ====
Lt General Karol Świerczewski

Polish 5th Infantry Division
Polish 7th Infantry Division
Polish 8th Infantry Division
Polish 9th Infantry Division
Polish 10th Infantry Division
Polish 1st Armored Corps

==== 52nd Army ====
Colonel General Konstantin Koroteyev

48th Rifle Corps

116th Rifle Division
294th Rifle Division

73rd Rifle Corps

50th Rifle Division
111th Rifle Division
254th Rifle Division

78th Rifle Corps

31st Rifle Division
214th Rifle Division
373rd Rifle Division

7th Guards Mechanised Corps

24th Guards Mechanized Brigade
25th Guards Mechanized Brigade
26th Guards Mechanized Brigade
57th Guards Tank Brigade

==== 3rd Guards Tank Army ====
Colonel General Pavel Rybalko

9th Mechanized Corps

69th Mechanized Brigade
70th Mechanized Brigade
71st Mechanized Brigade
91st Tank Brigade

6th Guards Tank Corps

22nd Guards Motorized Rifle Brigade
51st Guards Tank Brigade
52nd Guards Tank Brigade
53rd Guards Tank Brigade

7th Guards Tank Corps

23rd Guards Motorized Rifle Brigade
54th Guards Tank Brigade
55th Guards Tank Brigade
56th Guards Tank Brigade

4th Breakthrough Artillery Division

==== 4th Guards Tank Army ====
Colonel General Dmitry Lelyushenko

5th Guards Mechanized Corps

10th Guards Mechanized Brigade
11th Guards Mechanized Brigade
12th Guards Mechanized Brigade
24th Guards Tank Brigade

6th Guards Mechanized Corps

16th Guards Mechanized Brigade
17th Guards Mechanized Brigade
35th Guards Mechanized Brigade

10th Guards Tank Corps

29th Guards Motorized Rifle Brigade
61st Guards Tank Brigade
62nd Guards Tank Brigade
63rd Guards Tank Brigade

==== 28th Army ====
Colonel General Alexander Luchinsky

20th Rifle Corps

20th Rifle Division
48th Guards Rifle Division
55th Guards Rifle Division

38th Guards Rifle Corps

50th Guards Rifle Division
54th Guards Rifle Division
96th Guards Rifle Division

128th Rifle Corps

61st Rifle Division
130th Rifle Division
152nd Rifle Division

==== 31st Army ====
Lieutenant General Pyotr Shafranov

71st Rifle Corps

54th Rifle Division
88th Rifle Division
331st Rifle Division

44th Rifle Corps

62nd Rifle Division
174th Rifle Division
220th Rifle Division

36th Rifle Corps

352nd Rifle Division
173rd Rifle Division
176th Rifle Division

==== 1st Guards Cavalry Corps ====
Lieutenant General Viktor Kirillovich Baranov

1st Guards Cavalry Division
2nd Guards Cavalry Division
7th Guards Cavalry Division

==== Detailed breakdown ====
- 1st Ukrainian Front
  - 28th Army
    - 20th Rifle Corps
      - 20th Rifle Division
      - 48th Guards Rifle Division
      - 55th Guards Rifle Division
    - 128th Rifle Corps
      - 61st Rifle Division
      - 152nd Rifle Division
    - 25th Breakthrough Artillery Division
      - 3rd Guards Mortar Brigade
      - 39th Mortar Brigade
      - 48th Heavy Mortar Brigade
      - 175th Light Artillery Brigade
      - 179th Howitzer Artillery Brigade
      - 181st Heavy Howitzer Artillery Brigade
      - 183rd Howitzer Artillery Brigade
    - 31st Breakthrough Artillery Division
      - 35th Mortar Brigade
      - 51st Heavy Mortar Brigade
      - 191st Howitzer Artillery Brigade
      - 194th Heavy Howitzer Artillery Brigade
    - 8th Independent Guards Tank Destroyer Artillery Brigade
    - 157th Army Canon Artillery Brigade
    - 71st Anti-aircraft Artillery Division
    - 36th Engineer Brigade
  - 3rd Guards Tank Army
    - 9th Mechanised Corps
      - 69th Mechanised Brigade
      - 70th Mechanised Brigade
      - 71st Mechanised Brigade
      - 91st Tank Brigade
    - 6th Guards Tank Corps
      - 51st Guards Tank Brigade
      - 52nd Guards Tank Brigade
      - 53rd Guards Tank Brigade
      - 22nd Guards Motorised Rifle Brigade
    - 7th Guards Tank Corps
      - 54th Guards Tank Brigade
      - 55th Guards Tank Brigade
      - 56th Guards Tank Brigade
      - 23rd Guards Motorised Rifle Brigade
    - 16th Self-propelled Artillery Brigade
    - 57th Independent Guards Heavy Tank Regiment
    - 384th Guards Heavy Tank Regiment
    - 702nd Self-propelled Artillery Regiment
    - 1507th Self-propelled Artillery Regiment
    - 1893rd Self-propelled Artillery Regiment
    - 1977th Self-propelled Artillery Regiment
    - 1978th Self-propelled Artillery Regiment
    - 4th Breakthrough Artillery Division
      - 30th Guards Mortar Brigade
      - 37th Mortar Brigade
      - 49th Heavy Mortar Brigade
      - 50th Guards Heavy Howitzer Brigade
      - 163rd Howitzer Artillery Brigade
      - 168th Light Artillery Brigade
      - 171st Howitzer Artillery Brigade
    - 23rd Anti-aircraft Artillery Division
    - 19th Motorised Engineer Brigade
  - 4th Guards Tank Army
    - 10th Guards Tank Corps
      - 62nd Guards Tank Brigade
      - 63rd Guards Tank Brigade
      - 70th Guards Self-propelled Artillery Brigade
    - 71st Independent Guards Light Artillery Brigade
    - 6th Guards Anti-aircraft Artillery Division
  - 2nd Air Army
    - 2nd Guards Assault Aviation Corps
      - 5th Guards Assault Aviation Division
      - 11th Guards Fighter Aviation Division
    - 6th Guards Bomber Aviation Corps
      - 1st Guards Bomber Aviation Division
      - 8th Guards Bomber Aviation Division
    - 2nd Fighter Aviation Corps
      - 7th Guards Fighter Aviation Division
      - 322nd Fighter Aviation Division
    - 6th Guards Fighter Aviation Corps
      - 9th Guards Fighter Aviation Division
      - 23rd Guards Fighter Aviation Division
    - 219th Bomber Aviation Division
    - 4th Bomber Aviation Corps
    - 256th Fighter Aviation Division (parts)
    - 5th Fighter Aviation Corps
  - 18th Air Army
    - 1st Guards Bomber Aviation Corps
      - 11th Guards Bomber Aviation Division
      - 16th Guards Bomber Aviation Division
      - 36th Bomber Aviation Division
      - 48th Bomber Aviation Division
    - 2nd Guards Bomber Aviation Corps
      - 2nd Guards Bomber Aviation Division
      - 7th Guards Bomber Aviation Division
      - 13th Guards Bomber Aviation Division
    - 3rd Guards Bomber Aviation Corps
      - 1st Guards Bomber Aviation Division
      - 12th Bomber Aviation Division
      - 22nd Guards Bomber Aviation Division
      - 50th Bomber Aviation Division
    - 14th Bomber Aviation Division
    - 4th Guards Bomber Aviation Corps
    - 45th Bomber Aviation Division

== German Army Group Reserve ==
III SS Panzer Corps

Obergruppenführer Felix Steiner

Units later allocated to 9th Army:

503rd SS Heavy Panzer Battalion
11th SS Panzergrenadier Division

11th SS Panzer Regiment "Hermann von Salza" (I. & II. Battalions)
23rd SS Grenadier Regiment (II. & III. Battalions)
24th SS Grenadier Regiment (II. & III. Battalions)
11th SS Artillery Regiment (I. to III. Battalions)
11th SS Panzer Recce Battalion (3 companies)

British Free Corps

11th SS Pioneer Battalion

23rd SS Panzergrenadier Division

48th SS Volunteer Grenadier Regiment (I. & II. Battalions)
49th SS Volunteer Grenadier Regiment (I. & II. Battalions)
54th SS Volunteer Artillery Regiment (I. to III. Battalions)

Units later allocated to 3rd Panzer Army:

27th SS Grenadier Division

66th SS Volunteer Grenadier Regiment (I. & II. Battalions)
67th SS Volunteer Grenadier Regiment (I. & II. Battalions)
27th SS Volunteer Artillery Regiment (I. to IV. Battalions)

28th SS Grenadier Division

69th SS Volunteer Grenadier Regiment (I. & II. Battalions)
70th SS Volunteer Grenadier Regiment (I. & II. Battalions)
28th SS Volunteer Artillery Regiment (I. to IV. Battalions)
28th SS Volunteer Pioneer Battalion

== See also ==
- Soviet Air Forces order of battle 1 May 1945

== Bibliography ==
- Antill, Peter (2005). Berlin 1945: End of the Thousand Year Reich. Oxford: Osprey. ISBN 978-1-84176-915-8.
- Tieke, Wilhem (2001). Tragedy of the faithful: A History of the III. SS (germanisches) Panzerkorps. Old Heathfield, Sussex: J J Fedorowicz. ISBN 978-0921991618.
- Справочник «Освобождение городов: Справочник по освобождению городов в период Великой Отечественной войны 1941–1945» / М.Л.Дударенко, Ю.Г.Перечнев, В.Т.Елисеев и др. — М.: Воениздат, 1985. — 598 с

== Archives ==
- German archives in the Russian Federation: F. 500 op. 12452 d. 289 Dokumente und Materialien der Luftabwehr von Berlin im Mai 1945. Anfrage einer Flakeinheit über die notwendige Zahl der Volkssturmkräfte.
