= LXXIV Corps =

LXXIV Corps or 74th Corps may refer to:

- LXXIV Army Corps, Wehrmacht, Germany
- 74th (St Anne's) Lancashire Rifle Volunteer Corps, United Kingdom

== See also ==
- List of military corps by number
- 74th Brigade (disambiguation)
- 74th Division (disambiguation)
- 74th Regiment (disambiguation)
- 74th (disambiguation)
