= 74th Division =

In military terms, 74th Division may refer to:

== Infantry divisions ==
- 74th Division (People's Republic of China), 1949–1952; later the 70th Motorized Infantry Brigade
- 74th Division (2nd Formation) (People's Republic of China), 1969–1976
- 74th Infantry Division (Wehrmacht), Germany
- 74th Infantry Division (Russian Empire)
- 74th Guards Rifle Division, Soviet Union
- 74th (Yeomanry) Division, Territorial Force infantry unit of the British Army in the First World War
- 74th Infantry Division (United States), planned during the Second World War but never formed
- 74th Rifle Division (Soviet Union), see list of infantry divisions of the Soviet Union 1917–1957

== Artillery divisions ==
- 74th Anti-Aircraft Artillery Division, Soviet Union

== See also ==
- List of military divisions by number
- 74th Brigade (disambiguation)
- 74th Regiment (disambiguation)
