= 74th =

74th is the ordinal form of the number 74. 74th or Seventy-fourth may also refer to:

- A fraction, 1/74, equal to one of 74 equal parts

== Geography ==
- 74th meridian east, a line of longitude
- 74th meridian west, a line of longitude
- 74th parallel north, a circle of latitude
- 74th parallel south, a circle of latitude
- 74th Street (Manhattan)

== Military ==
- 74th Division (disambiguation)
- 74th Regiment (disambiguation)

== Other ==
- 74th century
- 74th century BC

== See also ==
- 74 (disambiguation)
