= 5th Guards Anti-Aircraft Artillery Division =

15th Anti-Aircraft Artillery Division (c. 23 November 1942–18 February 1945) 5th Guards Anti-Aircraft Artillery Division (18 February–November 1945)
- Active: November 1942–November 1945
- Country: Soviet Union
- Branch: Red Army
- Type: Anti-Aircraft Artillery
- Engagements: World War II
- Decorations: Order of Bogdan Khmelnitsky 2nd class; Order of the Red Star
- Battle honours: Simferopol

Commanders
- Notable commanders: Vyacheslav Bazhenov

The 5th Guards Anti-Aircraft Artillery Division (Russian: 5-я гвардейская зенитная артиллерийская дивизия) was an anti-aircraft artillery division of the Soviet Union's Red Army during World War II.

It was formed in November 1942 as the 15th Anti-Aircraft Artillery Division and fought in Operation Uranus and Operation Little Saturn in late 1942 and early 1943. In 1943 and 1944, it fought in the Donbass Strategic Offensive, the Melitopol Offensive, the Nikopol–Krivoi Rog Offensive, and the Crimean Offensive. For its actions in the latter, the division was awarded the honorific Simferopol and the Order of the Red Star. It remained in reserve from May 1944 to February 1945, when it was assigned to the 9th Guards Army after becoming the 5th Guards Anti-Aircraft Artillery Division, fighting in the Vienna Offensive and the Prague Offensive in the last stages of the war. For actions in the liberation of Hungary, the division received the Order of Bogdan Khmelnitsky, 2nd class. It was disbanded shortly after the end of the war.

== World War II ==
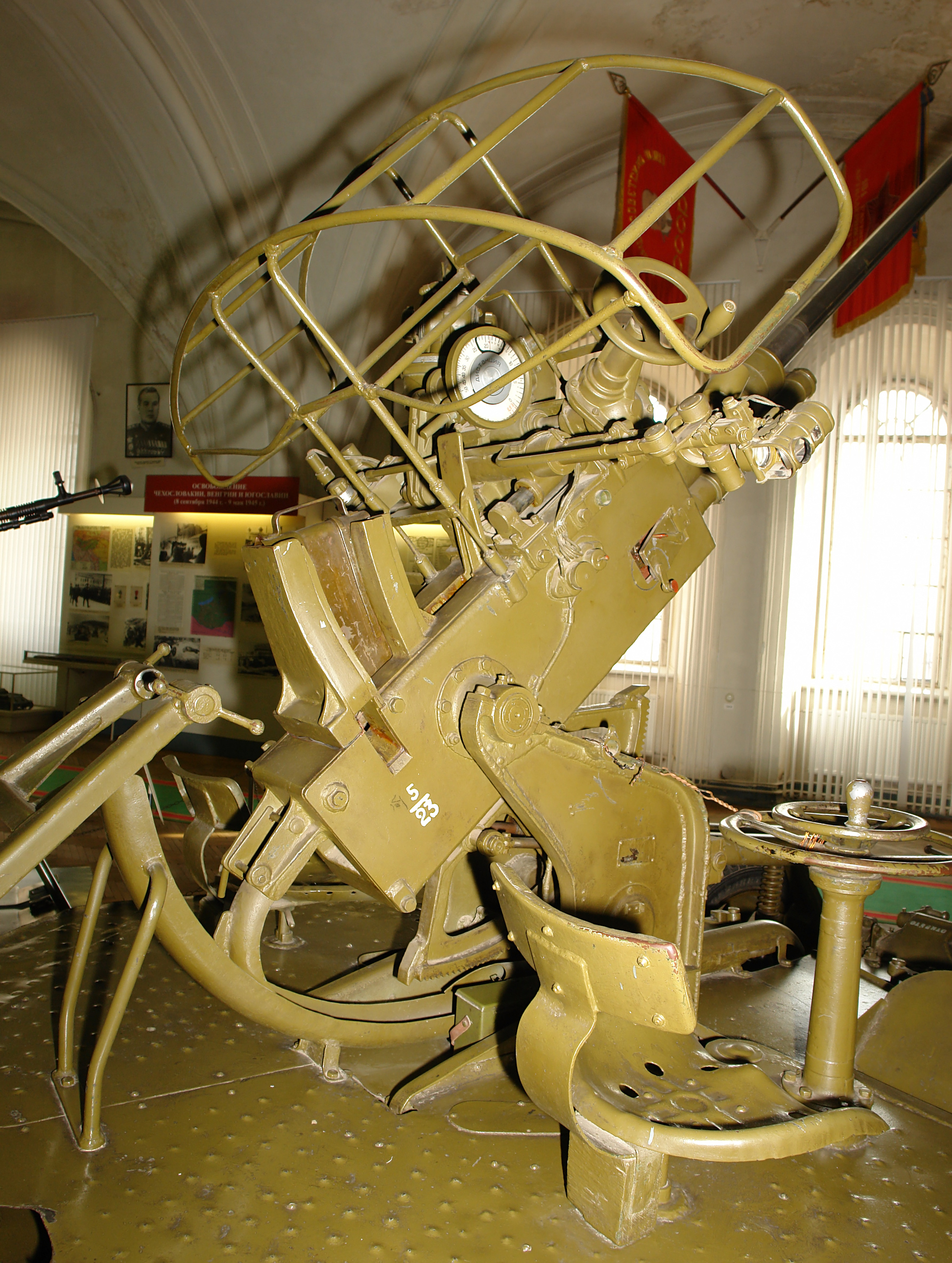
A 37 mm AA gun of the type used by the division during World War II

The 15th Anti-Aircraft Artillery Division RGK was formed in November 1942, including formerly separate anti-aircraft artillery regiments. Major Vyacheslav Bazhenov was assigned as commander on 23 November; he led the division for the rest of the war. Until 20 December, elements of the division provided air defense for the combat troops and rear area of the Don Front's 65th Army during Operation Uranus, the Soviet counteroffensive in the Battle of Stalingrad. It covered the breakthrough of the Axis lines northwest of Stalingrad and the advance of the army to the line south of Peskovatka and Vertyachy in Gorodishchensky District, helping to encircle German troops in Stalingrad. In December the division was transferred to the Stalingrad Front (Southern Front from 1 January 1943), providing air defense for the 2nd Guards Army, which was preparing a counterattack, Operation Little Saturn, against the German Army Group Don. By 1 January, it included the 281st, 342nd, 723rd, and the 1264th Anti-Aircraft Artillery Regiments. The regiments of the division moved forward with the division during the capture of Kotelnikovo and Zimovniki, and in the advance to the Manych River.

In February, elements of the 15th became part of an anti-aircraft group commanded by Bazhenov, who had been promoted to lieutenant colonel on 26 January. The group defended the Manych crossing near Bagayevskaya and provided air defense for the shock group of the 2nd Guards Army during its attack. Between December 1942 and February 1943, elements of the division claimed 32 enemy aircraft shot down and twelve damaged. It was transferred to the 28th Army by 1 April, and soon joined the 51st Army by 1 May. By 1 August the division had been transferred to the 5th Shock Army of the Southern Front, (the 4th Ukrainian Front from 20 October 1943), although its 281st Regiment was still with the 51st Army as of 1 August, but rejoined the rest of the division by 1 September. The division served with the 5th Shock in the Donbass and Melitopol Offensives of 1943. It was back with the 51st Army by 1 November. After fighting in the advance into Right-bank Ukraine, the division participated in the Nikopol–Krivoi Rog Offensive and the Crimean Offensive in the winter and spring of 1944. For "successful fulfillment of orders", the 15th was awarded the honorific Simferopol on 24 April and the Order of the Red Star for the capture of Sevastopol. In mid-May, after the end of the Crimean Offensive, the division was transferred to the Reserve of the Supreme High Command (RVGK) in the Henichesk area, remaining in reserve for almost a year. It joined the newly reformed Kharkov Military District by 1 June and was shifted north.

The 15th Division continued to provide air defense in the Kharkov Military District until January 1945, when it transferred back to the RVGK. On 18 February 1945, the division was made an elite Guards unit, the 5th Guards Anti-Aircraft Artillery Division, in recognition of its achievements. Around this time Bazhenov was promoted to colonel. Its regiments became the 103rd, 109th, 112th, and 161st Guards Anti-Aircraft Artillery Regiments, respectively. The division joined the 9th Guards Army, fighting on the 2nd Ukrainian Front and then the 3rd Ukrainian Front from 9 March. It fought in Hungary, in Austria during the Vienna Offensive, and in Czechoslovakia during the Prague Offensive in the final days of the war. For helping to capture Cherno and Sárvár, the 5th Guards received the Order of Bogdan Khmelnitsky, 2nd class, on 24 April. During the war, the division was credited with downing 457 and damaging 129 enemy aircraft, and destroying nine tanks, five guns, and five halftracks, as well as killing more than 700 German soldiers in ground combat.

== Postwar ==
Following the end of the war, the division became part of the Central Group of Forces in the Budapest area. It was disbanded in November, and Bazhenov transferred to command another anti-aircraft artillery division.
