= 74th Brigade =

74th Brigade may refer to:

== British India ==
- 74th Indian Infantry Brigade

== Russia ==
- 74th Separate Guards Motor Rifle Brigade

== United Kingdom ==
- 74th Armoured Brigade (Dummy Tanks)
- 74th Brigade (United Kingdom)
- 74th Brigade, Royal Field Artillery

== See also ==
- 74th Division (disambiguation)
- 74th Regiment (disambiguation)
