= 74 =

74 may refer to:

- 74 (number), the natural number following 73 and preceding 75
- one of the years 74 BC, AD 74, 1974, 2074
- The 74, an American nonprofit news website
- Seventy-four (ship), a type of two-decked sailing ship
- 74 Galatea, a main-belt asteroid

== See also ==
- 74th (disambiguation)
- List of highways numbered 74
