= 2nd Guards Anti-Aircraft Artillery Division =

1st Anti-Aircraft Artillery Division (26 October 1942 – 5 October 1943) 2nd Guards Anti-Aircraft Artillery Division (4 October 1943 – 20 March 1958)
- Active: October 1942 – March 1958
- Country: Soviet Union
- Branch: Red Army / Soviet Army
- Type: Anti-Aircraft Artillery
- Engagements: World War II
- Decorations: Order of the Red Banner; Order of Alexander Nevsky
- Battle honours: Baranovichi

Commanders
- Notable commanders: Leonid Polosukhin; Roman Dzivin

The 2nd Guards Anti-Aircraft Artillery Division (Russian: 2-я гвардейская зенитная артиллерийская дивизия) was an anti-aircraft artillery division of the Soviet Union's Red Army during World War II and the Soviet Army during the early years of the Cold War.

It was formed in October 1942 as the 1st Anti-Aircraft Artillery Division and was soon sent to the front in the Battle of Stalingrad, in which it provided air defense to the 21st Army. The division fought in the Battle of Kursk in July 1943, initially serving with the 13th Army and then the 2nd Tank Army in Operation Kutuzov. It advanced into northern Ukraine and southeastern Belarus in the late summer and early fall of 1943, and was converted into the 2nd Guards Anti-Aircraft Artillery Division in early October. The 2nd Guards fought in the campaign in eastern Belarus in the winter and spring of 1943 to 1944, and in Operation Bagration, receiving the honorific Baranovichi in the latter. In the last months of the war the division fought in the Vistula–Oder Offensive and the Battle of Berlin. It was awarded the Order of the Red Banner and the Order of Alexander Nevsky for its actions in the war. The division was garrisoned near Berlin postwar before being reorganized as a brigade in 1958.

== World War II ==
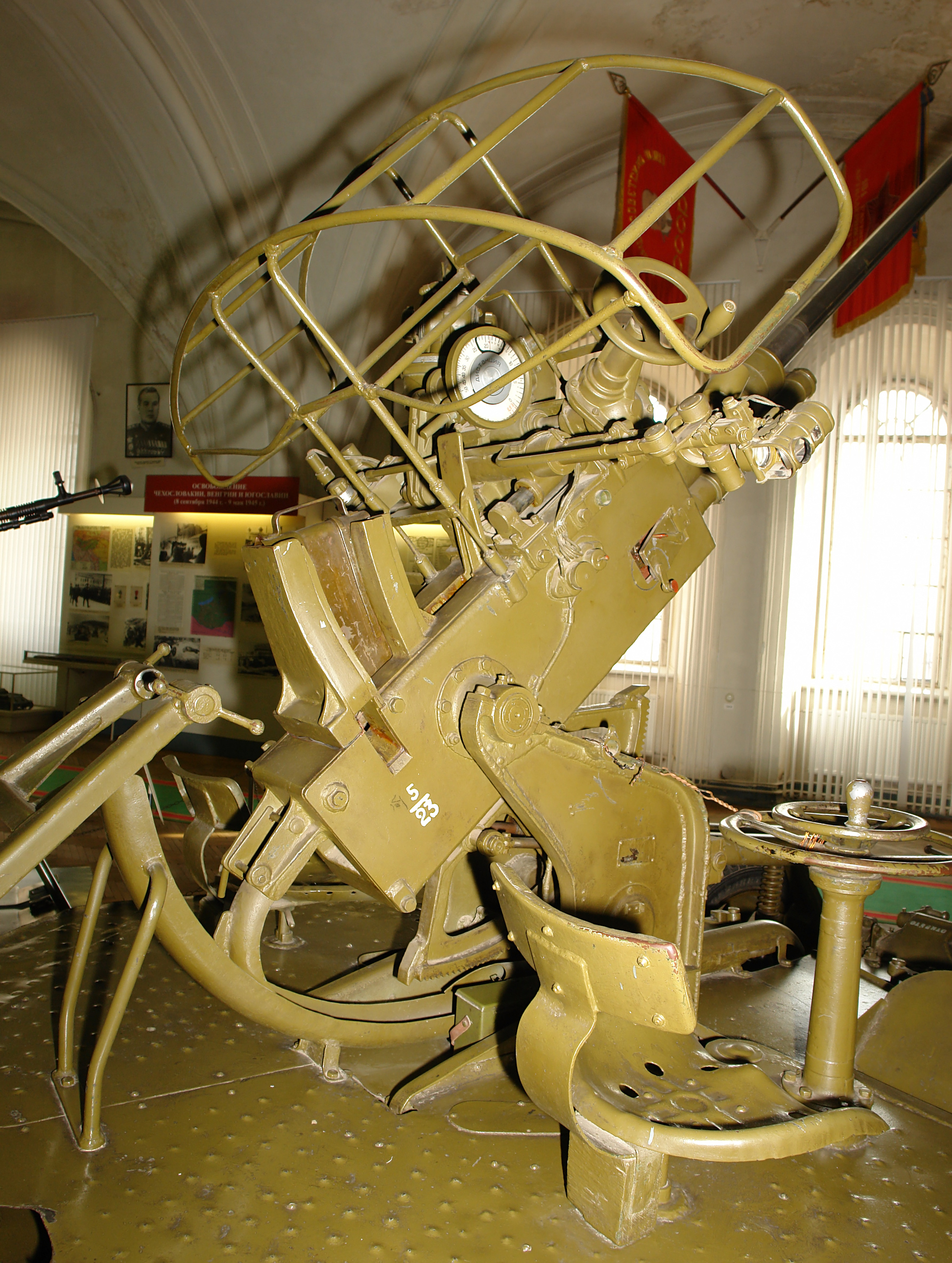
A 37 mm AA gun of the type used by the division during World War II

The 1st Anti-Aircraft Artillery Division of the Reserve of the Supreme High Command (RVGK) began forming on 26 October 1942 in the Moscow Military District under the command of Colonel (promoted to Major General 29 January 1943) Leonid Polosukhin. It completed its formation on 31 October, and was sent to the Don Front in the Battle of Stalingrad at the beginning of November, arriving by 12 November.

Between 13 November and 31 December, the 1st provided air defense for the 21st Army in its concentration areas for Operation Uranus, the Soviet counteroffensive at Stalingrad, the crossing of the Don River, the breakthrough of enemy defenses in the Kletskaya area, the insertion of mobile groups into the breakthrough, the pursuit and encirclement of German troops, and the blockade of the surrounded German troops at Stalingrad. From 1 January to 2 February 1943 the division provided air defense for the army during Operation Koltso, the elimination of the pocket. Between 12 November 1942 and 2 February 1943, claimed more than 60 German aircraft downed and 150 enemy soldiers captured. By 1 January, it included the 1068th, 1085th, 1090th and the 1116th Anti-Aircraft Artillery Regiments.

After the German surrender at Stalingrad, the division became part of the Stalingrad Group of Forces, remaining in the city until April, when it was transferred to the Central Front. At this time the heavy 1042nd Anti-Aircraft Artillery Regiment replaced the 1116th; the latter was broken up to strengthen the other three light regiments of the division. Polosukhin was replaced by Major General Roman Dzivin at the end of April. In May, the division became part of the front's 13th Army.

It fought in the Battle of Kursk, initially near Maloarkhangelsk. On 5 July, the beginning of the German attack, the division claimed 34 German aircraft downed and eleven damaged in six hours. After a German breakthrough at Ponyri, the 1st was transferred to the air, claiming six more aircraft on the march. Despite also suffering heavy losses, the division's units arrived at Ponyri, where they claimed fourteen aircraft downed and eight damaged. On 9 July, the division was operationally subordinated to the 2nd Tank Army, fighting in the Soviet counteroffensive, Operation Kutuzov. With the army, the 1st fought in the capture of Kromy, Dmitrovsk-Orlovsky, Dmitriyev-Lgovsky, and Sevsk. In the offensive, the division claimed 42 aircraft downed and sixteen damaged.

After the end of the offensive, the army was withdrawn to the RVGK and the division was concentrated in the town of Glukhov. It joined the 65th Army, providing air defense for the Desna crossing, and fought in the capture of Novgorod-Seversky during the Chernigov-Pripyat Offensive. For its actions, one of the division's light regiments was awarded the name of the city as an honorific. In October, the 1st was transferred to the 13th Army and fought in the Battle of the Dnieper, covering the crossing of the Dnieper near Loyew and the advance towards Rechitsa. For "successful fulfillment of command tasks, and personnel organization and discipline", the division became the elite 2nd Guards Anti-Aircraft Artillery Division on 4 October. Its regiments became the 302nd, 303rd, 304th, and 306th Guards Anti-Aircraft Artillery Regiments. Around 21 October Dzivin was transferred, and replaced by Colonel Pyotr Korchagin, who led the division for the rest of the war.

In the same month the 2nd Guards transferred back to the 65th Army, serving with it in eastern Belarus. It was shifted to the 48th Army in November, but moved back to the 65th in December. The division fought in the Gomel–Rechitsa Offensive, the Kalinkovichi-Mozyr Offensive, the Rogachev-Zhlobin Offensive, and attacks toward Mogilev between the fall of 1943 and the spring of 1944. In March, the 2nd Guards transferred to the 50th Army. The division was directly subordinated to the 1st Belorussian Front headquarters in April. In Operation Bagration, the 2nd Guards were attached to Lieutenant General Issa Pliyev's cavalry mechanized group, participating in a raid on the German rear towards Bobruisk, Minsk, and Brest. On 8 July the division participated in the capture of Baranovichi and received the city's name as an honorific. For actions in the operation, 306th Regiment platoon commander Junior Sergeant Alexander Kazakov was made a Hero of the Soviet Union. In the winter of 1944 to 1945, the division fought as part of the 5th Shock Army and participated in the Vistula–Oder Offensive from January. From mid-April, it fought in the Battle of Berlin, its last combat operation of the war. During the war, the division was awarded the Order of the Red Banner and the Order of Alexander Nevsky for its actions.

According to a report prepared by the division deputy chief of staff in late May, during the war, the 2nd Guards expended 24,508 rounds of heavy anti-aircraft gun ammunition, 227,464 rounds of light gun ammunition, and 169, 413 rounds of machine gun ammunition on air targets, as well as 2,137 rounds of heavy gun ammunition, 4,530 rounds of light gun ammunition, and 6,515 rounds of machine gun ammunition on ground targets. The division's heavy guns were credited with downing 75 enemy aircraft, light guns 332, and machine guns 24, for a total of 431 enemy aircraft downed. The report estimated that it had taken an average of 326 heavy gun rounds to down one aircraft, 685 medium gun rounds to down one aircraft, and 7,059 machine gun rounds to down one aircraft. The division reported its casualties as: 23 officers, 75 sergeants, and 176 privates killed for a total of 274, and 96 officers, 215 sergeants, and 559 privates wounded for a total of 870. Additionally, two 85mm and nineteen 37mm guns were destroyed along with eighteen 12.7mm machine guns, seventeen rangefinders, 98 vehicles, and two radio sets.

By comparison, on 31 January 1945, the division reported a strength of 2,087 men, sixteen 85mm guns, 72 37mm guns, and 39 12.7mm machine guns.

== Postwar ==
Following the end of the war, the division became part of the Group of Soviet Forces in Germany at Rehagen. On 20 March 1958, it was converted into the 109th Guards Anti-Aircraft Artillery Brigade.
