= 9th Rifle Corps =

- Active: 1922 - 1941; 1942 - October 1946
- Allegiance: Soviet Union
- Branch: Soviet Red Army
- Garrison/HQ: Simferopol
- Engagements: Eastern Front (World War II); Operation Barbarossa; Battle of Poznan; Battle of Berlin

The 9th Rifle Corps was a corps of the Red Army. Located in Simferopol during the beginning of the war in the east.

== History ==
The corps headquarters was formed in accordance with orders of the North Caucasus Military District of 6 June and 26 August 1922. Its headquarters was initially located at Grozny, then relocated to Vladikavkaz in January 1923 and thence to Novocherkassk in August 1925. The corps included the 13th Rifle Division for the disarmament of population of Dagestan in August 1925 and the 9th Rifle Division for the suppression of Karachay rebels between April and May 1930. In May 1932 the corps headquarters was relocated to Krasnodar, where it remained until 1941.

In late May 1941 the corps was relocated to Crimea with headquarters at Simferopol. At the beginning of the war the corps was re-organized as the new 51st Army. The corps was re-created in August than in May 1942 it was disbanded. In 1942 it was reformed yet again than assigned to the 9th Army later in February 1943. In 1944 it was assigned to the 28th Army as part of the 3rd Ukrainian Front where it remained until April 1945 when it transferred to the 5th Shock Army where it participated in both the Battle of Poznań and the Battle of Berlin where it later joined the Group of Soviet Forces in Germany, where was possibly disbanded later that year. The corps was later disbanded in October 1946 when the 5th Shock Army was disbanded.

== Structure before Operation Barbarossa 1941 ==
Organization of the corps before the start of the war in the east:

- Headquarters - Simferopol
- Political Commissar, 9th Rifle Corps - Colonel Ivan Zakharovich Susaikov
- Chief of Staff, 9th Rifle Corps
  - 9th Corps Armoured Reconnaissance Squadron
  - 9th Corps Engineer Battalion
  - 9th Corps Signal Battalion
  - 9th Corps Field Medical Battalion
  - 9th Corps Supply Group
  - 106th Rifle Division(Major general Aleksei Nikolaevich Pervushin)
  - 156th Rifle Division (Major general Platon Vasilevich Cherniayev)
  - 234th Rifle Division (Later added at start of war)
  - 32nd Cavalry Division (Colonel A. I. Batskalevich)
- Artillery Commander, 9th Rifle Corps - Major general Mikhail Mikhailovich Barsukov
  - 9th Corps Heavy Field Artillery Regiment
  - 9th Corps Field Artillery Regiment
  - 9th Corps Anti-Aircraft Battalion

== Structure of the corps just before the 1944 operations ==
- Headquarters under Major General Ivan Rosly
  - 9th Corps Armoured Reconnaissance Squadron
  - 9th Corps Engineer Battalion
  - 9th Corps Signal Battalion
  - 9th Corps Field Medical Battalion
  - 9th Corps Supply Group
- Infantry Commander, 9th Corps
  - 230th Rifle Division
  - 301st Rifle Division
- Artillery Commander, 9th Corps
  - 9th Corps Heavy Field Artillery Regiment
  - 9th Corps Field Artillery Regiment
  - 9th Corps Anti-Aircraft Battalion

Prior to the Vistula-Oder offensive the 248th Rifle Division came under command of the corps and continued under its command until the corps was disbanded in October 1946.
