= 32nd Rifle Corps =

- Active: 1939–1941; 1943–1946
- Country: Soviet Union
- Branch: Red Army
- Type: Rifle corps
- Engagements: World War II; Eastern Front

Commanders
- Notable commanders: Trofim Kolomiets

The 32nd Rifle Corps was a corps of the Red Army during World War II, formed twice. Each formation was a distinct unit, unrelated to the other.

== First formation ==
The corps headquarters formed in the Transbaikal Military District in September 1939. It was commanded by Major General Trofim Kolomiets, its second and last commander, from 29 November 1939. On 22 June 1941 the corps included the 46th and 152nd Rifle Divisions and was part of the 16th Army. The corps and the 16th Army were transferred west and became part of the Southwestern Front in late June. On 2 July they were transferred to the Western Front after the German breakthrough in the Battle of Białystok–Minsk. The units of the corps were committed in attempts to recapture Smolensk in mid-July. As the 152nd Rifle Division was placed under direct army control, the corps headquarters was left with only the 46th Division under its control by 17 July. The corps headquarters was disbanded on 15 August 1941 as the Red Army eliminated most corps headquarters due to command and control difficulties.

== Second formation ==
The corps headquarters was reformed as part of the 3rd Guards Army in late April and early May 1943 under the command of Major General Dmitry Zherebin, who commanded it for its entire existence. The corps later served with the 5th Guards Army and the 5th Shock Army and fought in the Donbass Strategic Offensive, the Nikopol–Krivoy Rog Offensive, the Uman–Botoșani Offensive, the Warsaw–Poznan Offensive, the East Pomeranian Offensive, and the Berlin Offensive. The corps captured a bridgehead on the left bank of Oder and later took Kustrin between 30 January and 30 March 1945. It broke through German defenses and participated in the capture of the Berlin city center between 16 April and 2 May. For his leadership of the corps Zherebin was made a Hero of the Soviet Union and the corps received the honorific Berlin.

Postwar, the 32nd served as part of the 5th Shock Army of the Group of Soviet Occupation Forces in Germany. The corps headquarters was disbanded in December 1946. Its 60th Guards Rifle Division was disbanded, while the 295th Rifle Division was sent to the North Caucasus and the 18th Mechanized Division transferred to the 3rd Shock Army.
