= 74th Infantry Division (Wehrmacht) =

- 74. Infanterie-Division
- Active: 1944
- Country: Germany
- Branch: Heer (Wehrmacht)
- Type: Infantry
- Size: Division (never fulfilled)
- Garrison/HQ: Milowitz
- Engagements: None

The 74th Infantry Division (German: 74. Infanterie-Division) was a planned infantry division of the German Heer during World War II. Initially designed to be supplied with recruits by the Milowitz Division as part of the 24th Aufstellungswelle, the creation of the 74th Infantry Division was never realized. The planned regiments 1031, 1032 and 1033 were not established. The Milowitz Division was established at Milowitz training field on 27 January 1944 and was then sent to the Eastern Front, where its members were assigned to replenish the 320th Infantry Division, 106th Infantry Division and 389th Infantry Division.
