= 74th Regiment of Foot (disambiguation) =

Five regiments of the British Army have been numbered the 74th Regiment of Foot:

- 74th Regiment of Foot, or Earl of Halifax's, raised in 1745 and disbanded in 1746
- 74th Regiment of Foot, renumbered from the 2nd Battalion, 38th Regiment of Foot in 1758 and disbanded in 1763
- 74th Regiment of Foot (Invalids), renumbered from the 117th in 1762 and disbanded in 1768
- 74th Regiment of (Highland) Foot (Argylshire Highlanders), raised in 1777 and disbanded in 1784
- 74th (Highland) Regiment of Foot (Campbell's Highlanders), raised in 1787 and amalgamated into the Highland Light Infantry in 1881
