= 295th Rifle Division =

- Active: 1st formation: July–September 1941; 2nd formation: October 1941 – 1946, 1953–1955
- Country: Soviet Union
- Branch: Red Army
- Type: Rifle division
- Engagements: World War II
- Decorations: 2nd formation: Order of Lenin; Order of the Red Banner; Order of Suvorov 2nd class
- Battle honours: Kherson (2nd formation)

Commanders
- Notable commanders: Alexander Dorofeyev

The 295th Rifle Division (Russian: 295-я стрелковая дивизия) was an infantry division of the Soviet Union's Red Army and later the Soviet Army, formed twice.

The 295th's first formation was formed in the summer of 1941 and destroyed within months during the Battle of Kiev. Reformed in October, the 295th fought in the North Caucasus, the Second Jassy–Kishinev Offensive, Poland, and Germany during the rest of the war. The 295th was downsized into a brigade after the end of the war and was relocated to the North Caucasus. It was reformed from the brigade in 1953 and renumbered in 1955.

== History ==
=== First Formation ===
The 295th began forming on 10 July 1941 at Chuguyev in the Kharkov Military District, just east of Kharkov. Its key units included the 1038th, 1040th, and the 1042nd Rifle Regiments, the 819th Artillery Regiment, the 563rd Sapper Battalion, and the 352nd Reconnaissance Company. In early August, the division was moved west to the Southwestern Front and assigned to the 37th Army. By 24 August it was defending the city of Kiev itself. On 7 September the 295th was relocated north and became part of the 5th Army, which had retreated across the Pripyat River and the Dnieper to cover the northern flank of the Soviet troops at Kiev. The 1042nd Regiment was detached to the 40th Army and as a result was not trapped in the Kiev pocket with the rest of the division, and survived as a separate regiment. The main forces of the 295th were destroyed in the Kiev pocket in late September, and it was officially disbanded on 30 September.

=== Second Formation ===
The division began reforming on 1 October 1941 in the Kursk area, part of the Southwestern Front, with the same basic order of battle as the first formation. It was immediately assigned to the 21st Army, but by mid-November was part of the Southern Front's newly reformed 37th Army. In June 1942, the division and its army retreated into the Caucasus in the face of the German offensive, Case Blue, and became part of the North Caucasian Front. From August, the division and 37th Army defended positions along the Terek River and in the Mozdok area as part of the North Group of the Transcaucasian Front. After the beginning of the German retreat from the Caucasus in late 1942, the 37th Army pursued, and the 295th participated in the recapture of Armavir on 24 January 1943. Between June and August, the division was part of the 58th Army of the North Caucasus Front. In September it was transferred to the Southern Front's 2nd Guards Army. The Southern Front became 4th Ukrainian Front on 20 October.

While serving with the 2nd Guards Army, the 295th was awarded the Order of the Red Banner and the honorific "Kherson" for recapturing Kherson. The division gained the placename-honorific "Kherson" by Prikaz of the VGK No. 67 of 23 March 1944.

In March 1944, the 295th was transferred to the 3rd Ukrainian Front's 5th Shock Army, with which it remained for the remainder of the war. The division fought in the Second Jassy–Kishinev Offensive in the summer of 1944 and after its end in September the 5th Shock Army was relocated north to become part of the 1st Belorussian Front. From October to the end of the war the 295th was part of the 32nd Rifle Corps in the army. By February 1945, its anti-tank unit was the 65th SU Battalion, which had 12 SU-76 self-propelled guns. Postwar, the 295th was initially part of the Group of Soviet Forces in Germany with the 32nd Rifle Corps in the summer of 1945. However, it was soon relocated to Stavropol in the North Caucasus Military District with the 23rd Rifle Corps, where it became the 30th Separate Rifle Brigade in 1946. In October 1953, the brigade was upgraded into the 295th Rifle Division. In 1955 it was renumbered the 49th Rifle Division.
