= 416th Rifle Division =

416th Rifle Division (9 December 1941 – 27 January 1942) 416th Rifle Division (15 March 1942 – 1946)
- Active: 1941–1946
- Country: Soviet Union
- Branch: Red Army
- Type: Division
- Role: Infantry
- Engagements: Battle of the Caucasus; Battle of Rostov (1943); Donbass Strategic Offensive; Lower Dniepr Offensive; Nikopol–Krivoi Rog Offensive; First Jassy–Kishinev Offensive; Second Jassy–Kishinev Offensive; Vistula-Oder Offensive; Battle of Küstrin; Berlin Strategic Offensive Operation

Commanders
- Notable commanders: Col. S. P. Storozhilov; Col. V. T. Maslov; Mjr. Gen. D. M. Sizranov

The 416th Rifle Division was formed for the first time as a standard Red Army rifle division late in 1941, after the Soviet winter counteroffensive had begun, but was soon re-designated. A second formation began in March 1942, this time as an Azerbaijani National Division and was completed in July, after which it remained serving in the southern sectors of the Soviet-German front until the autumn of 1944, when it was redeployed to Poland in anticipation of the final offensives into the German heartland; it served until 1946.

== 1st formation ==
The first 416th Rifle Division began forming on December 9, 1941, in the Moscow Military District. Its primary order of battle was as follows:

- 1368th Rifle Regiment
- 1373rd Rifle Regiment
- 1374th Rifle Regiment
- 1054th Artillery Regiment

The division was still forming up on January 27, 1942, when it was re-designated as the 2nd formation of the 146th Rifle Division while still in the Moscow region.

== 2nd formation ==
The second 416th Rifle Division began forming on March 15, 1942, at Sumgait in the Transcaucasus Military District, this time as a division of mostly Azerbaijani nationals. It continued to form up in this District until July. The division's primary order of battle remained as above, and was completed as follows:

- 444th Antitank Battalion
- 348th Sapper Battalion
- 921st Signal Battalion
- 222nd Reconnaissance Company

== Operational history ==
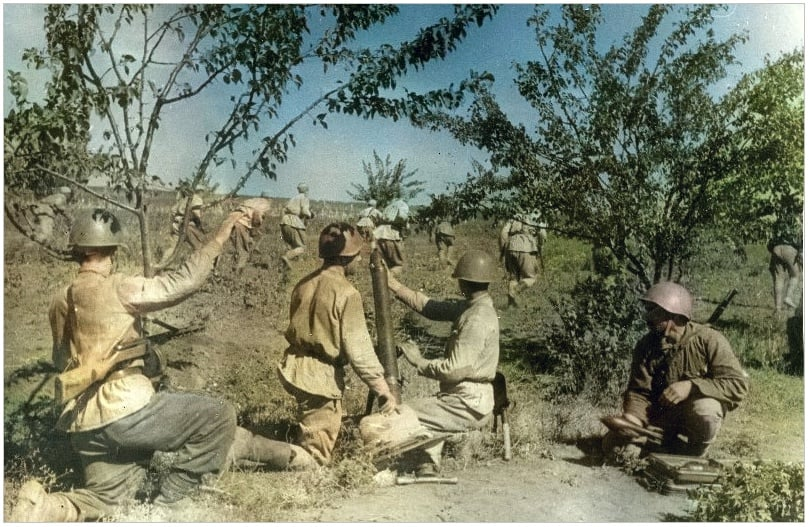
Mortarmen of Senior Sergeant Vasily Nikolayevich Pometov's platoon of the 1368th Rifle Regiment supporting the advance of their company on Melitopol, October 1943. Pometov died of wounds on 30 October.

The division was first assigned to the 44th Army, and in late August it was defending along the Terek River on the northern approaches to Grozny. After September the 416th was transferred to the 58th Army in Transcaucasus Front's Northern Group. At year's end it was back in 44th Army, which was transferred to the South Front in February 1943. After liberating Rostov-na-Donu on the 14th, the front came up against the German fortified positions along the Mius River and were held there until the line was broken at the outset of the Donbass Strategic Offensive in August. 44th Army was on the front's left flank, and on August 30 the 416th participated in the liberation of the city of Taganrog, and received its name as an honorific. Immediately following, the division was moved to 28th Army, and after the front was renamed 4th Ukrainian in October, the 416th was shifted once again in November, joining 37th Rifle Corps in the 3rd Guards Army.

In February 1944, the division made its first major shift of commands, to the 5th Shock Army of 3rd Ukrainian Front. Apart from a brief shift with its corps to 46th Army in May, it would remain in that army for the duration. During the 1st Jassy-Kishinev Offensive in April 1944, 5th Shock assisted in the liberation of Odessa, but soon after came up against the German/Romanian defenses along the Dniestr River. On the night of 18–19 April, 37th Corps attempted an assault crossing to seize the German strongpoint at Talmazy, but was unsuccessful; the 416th was in reserve during this attack. A further effort was made in early May with similar results, and after several successful German counterattacks, the front went over to the defense in mid-May.

The division participated in the Second Jassy–Kishinev Offensive in late August. After this offensive was well underway, 5th Shock Army was withdrawn to the Reserve of the Supreme High Command. In October it became part of the 1st Belorussian Front, and the 416th became part of the 32nd Rifle Corps; it would remain in that front and that corps for the duration and afterwards. Under these commands it took part in the Vistula-Oder Offensive and the East Pomeranian Offensive, during which it played a main role in the capture of the fortified city of Küstrin, leading to the final offensive on Berlin.

During the Battle of Berlin, the division, with its corps, captured the Jannowitzbrücke station S-Bahn station on April 29, and attacked the City Palace the next day. The division also helped capture the Reichsbank on May 1. The soldiers of the 416th ended the war with the official title of 416th Rifle, Taganrog, Order of the Red Banner, Order of Suvorov Division. (Russian: 416-я стрелковая Таганрогская Краснознамённая ордена Суворова дивизия.) It went on to serve postwar in the Group of Soviet Forces in Germany.

== Postwar ==
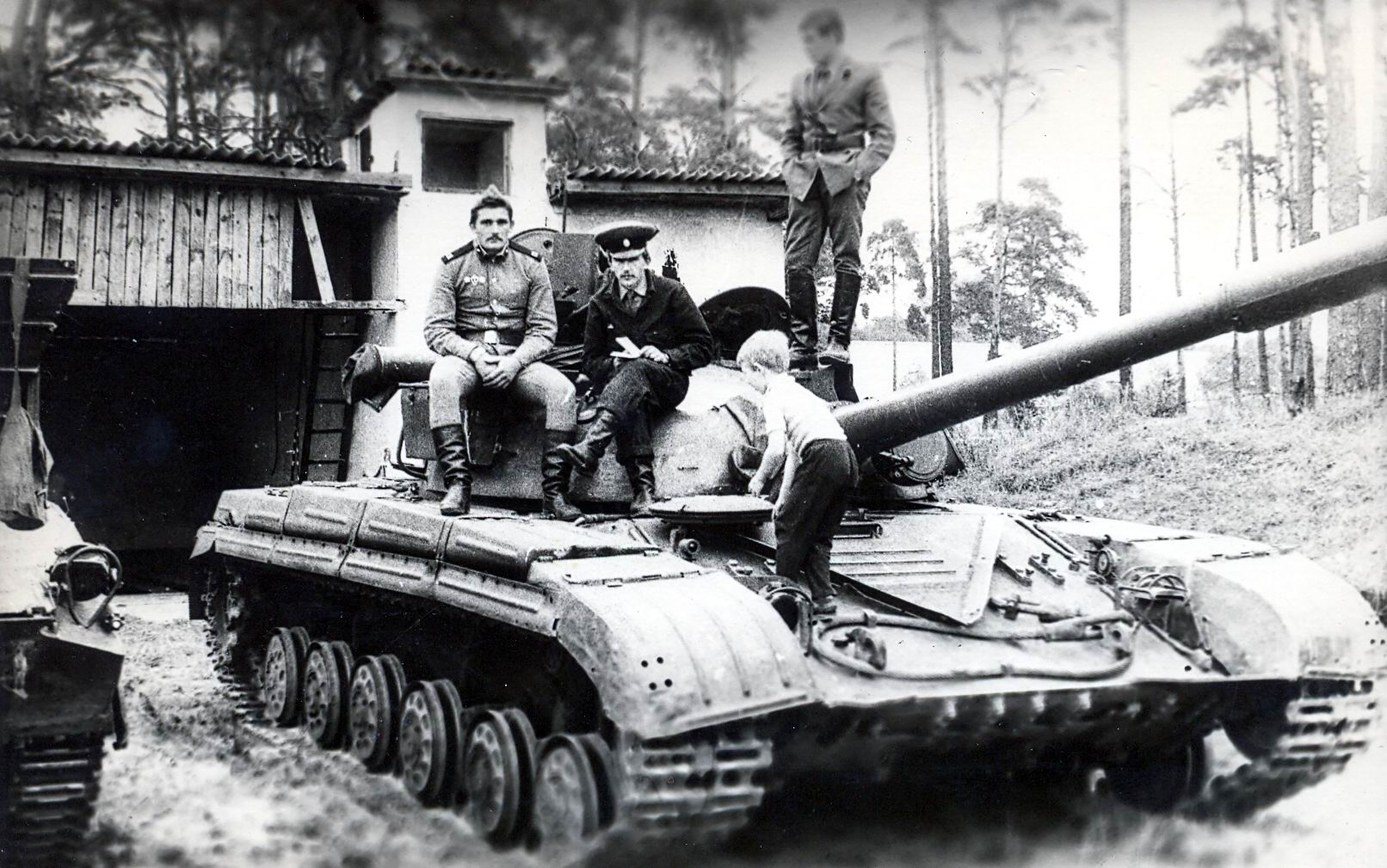
A T-64 of the division in the 1980s at Perleburg

After the war, the division became the 18th Mechanised Division, then the 18th MRD in 1957. The division was part of the 3rd Red Banner Army from 1957 to 1964. In 1965 it became the 21st Motor Rifle Division, remaining in the 2nd Guards Tank Army in Germany. After the end of the Cold War it was withdrawn to Omsk, became the 180th Motor Rifle Brigade in August 1993 (with some personnel transferred in from the 56th Training Motor Rifle Division also in Omsk), and finally the 139th Weapons and Equipment Storage Base in 1997, and then disbanded only in 2007.

By September 1995, some 107 T-90 tanks had been produced, located in the Siberian Military District. A U.S. report said that "..with only 150 built by mid-1998, the Siberian Military District's 21st Motor Rifle Division received [some of] these MBTs and formed a tank regiment.""

Russian forum sites however cast some doubt on whether the numbering of the Weapons and Equipment Storage Base, sourced from Lensky, is correct.
