= 74th Infantry Division (Russian Empire) =

- 74-я пехотная дивизия
- Active: 1914–1918
- Country: Russian Empire
- Branch: Russian Imperial Army
- Role: Infantry

The 74th Infantry Division (Russian: 74-я пехотная дивизия, 74-ya Pekhotnaya Diviziya) was an infantry formation of the Russian Imperial Army.

== Organization ==
- 1st Brigade
  - 293rd Infantry Regiment
  - 294th Infantry Regiment
- 2nd Brigade
  - 295th Infantry Regiment
  - 296th Infantry Regiment
