= 301st Rifle Division =

301st Rifle Division (July 10, 1941 – December 27, 1941) 301st Rifle Division (December 27, 1941 – July 13, 1942) 301st Rifle Division (June, 1943 – October, 1946)
- Active: 1941–1946
- Country: Soviet Union
- Branch: Red Army
- Type: Infantry
- Size: Division
- Engagements: Operation Barbarossa; Battle of Kiev (1941); Second Battle of Kharkov; Operation Blue; Donbass Strategic Offensive; Battle of the Dniepr; First Jassy–Kishinev Offensive; Second Jassy–Kishinev Offensive; Vistula-Oder Offensive; Battle of Berlin
- Decorations: Order of Suvorov (3rd Formation)
- Battle honours: Stalino (3rd Formation)

Commanders
- Notable commanders: Col. Aleksei Aleksandrovich Sokolov; Maj. Gen. Aleksandr Timofeevich Volchkov; Col. Pyotr Ivanovich Ivanov; Col. Vladimir Semyonovich Antonov

The 301st Rifle Division began service as a standard Red Army rifle division shortly after the German invasion, but was soon largely destroyed in the encirclement of Kiev, although enough of a cadre survived to form the basis of a second formation. This new division began forming in the last days of 1941, and saw some limited service in the Second Battle of Kharkov, but then had to fall back in the face of the German summer offensive, became encircled quite early on, and had to be disbanded in July. Nearly a year later a third 301st was raised, based on the personnel and equipment of two existing rifle brigades. This incarnation of the division compiled a creditable record of service in several major offensives through Ukraine, then into Poland and into the heart of Berlin in April, 1945, and also served briefly post-war in the Group of Soviet Forces in Germany, headquartered in Berlin.

== 1st Formation ==
The division began forming on July 10, 1941 at Poltava in the Kharkov Military District. Its order of battle was as follows:

- 1050th Rifle Regiment
- 1052nd Rifle Regiment
- 1054th Rifle Regiment
- 823rd Artillery Regiment
- 356th Reconnaissance Battalion
- 592nd Sapper Battalion
- 757th Signal Battalion

Col. Aleksei Aleksandrovich Sokolov was assigned as commanding officer on the day the division began forming. Less than a month after this the 301st was assigned to Southwestern Front, arriving after a relatively short march on August 2. Three days later it was assigned to 38th Army, but by September 1 it was shifted northwards to a position along the Dniepr River about 70km southeast of Kiev in 26th Army. This reassignment proved the division's undoing as it was largely trapped when the German forces linked up far east of Kiev later in September. While the division was effectively destroyed as a fighting force during that month, it appears that at least a cadre escaped, including Col. Sokolov, who remained in command on the books until December 1. He was replaced on that date by Maj. Gen. Aleksandr Timofeevich Volchkov. The division was finally officially removed from the Soviet order of battle on December 27, and on the same date a new formation of the division began, also under Maj. Gen. Volchkov.

== 2nd Formation ==
On December 27, as the old 301st was stricken off, a new division began forming up, initially numbered the 447th, this time at Krasnoyarsk in the Siberian Military District. As well as the same commander, and probably some of the staff, it also had the same order of battle as the 1st formation. In spite of this it took three months to complete forming up, which would tend to indicate that this was largely a ground-up rebuilding. General Volchkov was replaced in command by Col. Pyotr Ivanovich Ivanov on February 19, 1942; Ivanov would remain in command through the remainder of the 2nd formation's existence.

The division left Siberia in late March, 1942, assigned once again to Southwestern Front on April 1. It spent most of April in 28th Army, and then was reassigned to 21st Army. On May 11, when a new offensive on Kharkov began, 21st Army was part of the "northern group" attacking towards the city. The 301st was not part of the Army's assault force; 1054th Rifle Regiment was assigned to hold the line east of Belgorod, while 1050th and 1052nd Regiments constituted the Army's reserve, and began moving towards the front from the region of Krasnaia Poliana on May 12. By the end of the day on May 14 the division had advanced to the Northern Donets River west of Maslova Pristen, nearly due south of Belgorod, but this was a narrow salient and the advance was halted here.

While it escaped the catastrophe that engulfed the "southern group" in the Kharkov offensive, the 301st still took significant casualties in its attacks, which left it too weak to survive in the face of the German Operation Blue. When the offensive began on June 28 the division was still in 21st Army, helping to defend a front west of Staryi and Novyi Oskol, opposite the bulk of German 6th Army. An attack by that Army on June 30, aimed at the junction of 21st and 28th Armies, encircled the 301st and 227th Rifle Divisions, plus the 10th Tank Brigade. Some elements of the division escaped, along with the other remnants of 21st Army, but the division was ground down to the point it had to be disbanded again on July 13.

== 3rd Formation ==
The final 301st Rifle Division began forming in late June, 1943, and completed on August 14, when Col. Vladimir Semyonovich Antonov was named as commanding officer; he would remain in this position for the duration of the war. The new division was based on the personnel of the 34th Rifle Brigade and the 157th Rifle Brigade.

=== 34th Rifle Brigade ===
The 3rd formation of this brigade started forming in late August, 1942, at Baku in the Transcaucasus Military District from students of the army and navy schools in and around the city. It was part of the emergency response to the Axis advance into the Caucasus in July, and in September the brigade went to the front in the 11th Guards Rifle Corps of 9th Army. In October, under the command of Col. A.V. Vorozhitsev, it was defending along the Terek River against the 1st Panzer Army. Since enemy armor could be expected in quantity, the brigade was reinforced with heavy support, including:

- 2nd Battalion, 98th Guards Corps Artillery Regiment (152mm gun-howitzers)
- 52nd Mortar Battalion (120mm mortars)
- 337th Antitank Battalion

The 34th remained under these commands when the Germans began to retreat after Stalingrad, and on January 24, 1943, it took part in the liberation of Armavir. In February, 11th Guards Corps was briefly reassigned to 58th Army in the North Caucasus Front, but by March 1 both the Corps and the brigade were back in 9th Army. In April the 34th moved for the last time, to the 9th Rifle Corps in the same Army, where it began converting to the 301st Rifle Division in June.

=== 157th Rifle Brigade ===
The 2nd formation of this brigade began in September, 1942, in the Transcaucasus Front, formed from training units in the Transcaucasus. By October 1 it had been sent to 44th Army of the Front's Northern Group of Forces. In November it became part of 9th Rifle Corps in the same Army, and remained in that Corps from that point on. After the front lines moved to the Kuban near the end of the year 9th Corps was transferred to 9th Army of the North Caucasus Front in January, 1943. The 157th remained facing the German forces in the Taman peninsula over the coming months, then it began converting to the 301st Rifle Division in June.

== Advance ==
The division's order of battle mostly remained the same as the first two formations, but it inherited the 337th Antitank Battalion from the 34th Brigade. On August 20 the 301st was declared fit for service. It remained in the 9th Rifle Corps, where it was formed, for the duration of the war and on into the postwar period. 9th Corps was almost immediately reassigned to 5th Shock Army, where it would serve for most of the rest of the war. 5th Shock was then in South Front (later 4th Ukrainian Front), and the 301st served in that Front until February, 1944.

It arrived at the front during the Donbass Strategic Offensive, advancing through the southernmost part of the Soviet-German front. On September 8 the division was recognized for its role in the liberation of Stalino, and was given its name as an honorific:

"STALINO"... 301st Rifle Division (Colonel Antonov, Vladimir Semyonovich)... The troops that participated in the liberation of the Donbass, during which they captured Stalino and other cities, by order of the Supreme High Command on September 8, 1943, are given congratulations, and in Moscow a salute was given with 20 artillery salvos of 224 guns."

In November the division was moved to 28th Army, then back to 5th Shock when that army was reassigned to 3rd Ukrainian Front. In April, 1944 the 301st was in 57th Army of the same front during the First Jassy–Kishinev Offensive. On the 11th the division reached the Dniestr River and, without bridging equipment, began forcing a crossing with improvised means:

"The 1050th Rifle Regiment from Col. V.S. Antonov's 301st Rifle Division began crossing the river shortly after noon, a platoon and company at a time on these fragile rafts and boats. Despite heavy German machine-gun fire, the regiment's 1st Battalion managed to cross the river just south of Bychok, captured the Germans' first trench line, and assaulted Hill 65.3, which was situated less than one mile [2km] southwest of Bychok. The regiment's 2nd Battalion and headquarters group also successfully crossed the river an hour later.

In the end, the several bridgeheads seized by 57th Army proved too small and shallow for major crossing operations, and the offensive on this sector came to a halt.

When the Second Jassy–Kishinev Offensive began in late August, 9th Corps and the 301st were still in 57th Army, but before month's end would return to 5th Shock Army, where they remained until postwar. At the start of the offensive 9th Corps, reinforced by 96th Tank Brigade, was committed to the fighting on the second day, moving up to the area north of Lake Botno while covered by an 11km-wide smoke screen. On August 22, still under cover of smoke, 9th Corps joined the fighting on 57th Army's left flank, supported by tanks and by the SU-76s of the 1202 SU Regiment. This combined force crushed the enemy's resistance and by 0830 hrs. seized the strongpoints of Ursoiya and Kaushan station. By the close of the day the 301st had advanced up to 10-15km in the day's fighting and taken the village of Zaim. The advance continued the next day and 9th Corps attained all its objectives, advancing so aggressively that it was outrunning the corps that had been in the first echelon.

The whole 5th Shock Army went into the Reserve of the Supreme High Command in September, and the division's 337th Antitank Battalion had its towed guns replaced with self-propelled SU-76 guns. In November, 5th Shock joined 1st Belorussian Front for the duration, allowing the 301st to take part in the final defeat of Germany in Poland, East Pomerania, and in Berlin. On May 2, 1945, units of the 301st reported the capture of the ruins of the New Reich Chancellery building, just as fighting in the city was drawing to an end, and Colonel Antonov was shown the burned bodies of Josef and Magda Goebbels. By this time the division had earned, in addition to its honorific Stalino, the Order of Suvorov as well. (Russian: 301-я стрелковая Сталинская ордена Суворова дивизия).

Following the German surrender, when most Soviet formations were being demobilized, 5th Shock Army, including the 301st Rifle Division, was selected to be part of the Group of Soviet Forces in Germany, with its headquarters in Berlin. The division was disbanded in October, 1946, with the army.

== Bibliography ==
- Feskov, V.I.; Golikov, V.I.; Kalashnikov, K.A.; Slugin, S.A. (2013). Вооруженные силы СССР после Второй Мировой войны: от Красной Армии к Советской [The Armed Forces of the USSR after World War II: From the Red Army to the Soviet: Part 1 Land Forces] (in Russian). Tomsk: Scientific and Technical Literature Publishing. ISBN 9785895035306.
- Main Personnel Directorate of the Ministry of Defense of the Soviet Union (1964). Командование корпусного и дивизионного звена советских вооруженных сил периода Великой Отечественной войны 1941 – 1945 гг [Commanders of Corps and Divisions in the Great Patriotic War, 1941–1945] (in Russian). Moscow: Frunze Military Academy. p. 252
