= 5th Shock Army =

5th Shock Army (1942–46)
- Active: 9 December 1942 – December 1946
- Disbanded: December 1946
- Country: Soviet Union
- Branch: Red Army
- Size: Army
- Part of: Stalingrad Front; Southwestern Front; 4th Ukrainian Front; 3rd Ukrainian Front; 1st Belorussian Front; 3rd Belorussian Front; Group of Soviet Occupation Forces in Germany
- Engagements: Battle of Stalingrad; Battle of Rostov (1943); Liberation of Left Bank and Right Bank Ukraine, Jassy–Kishinev Offensive; Vistula–Oder Offensive; Battle of Berlin

The 5th Shock Army was a Red Army field army of World War II. The army was formed on 9 December 1942 by redesignating the 10th Reserve Army. The army was formed two times prior to this with neither formation lasting more than a month before being redesignated.

== Formation ==
The 5th Shock Army was formed on December 8, 1942, based upon the headquarters of the 10th Reserve Army, which was assigned to the Reserve of the Supreme High Command at the time. It was formed within Stalingrad Front, and was brought together in the remarkably short span of four days (December 9–12). Its first commanding officer was Lt. General M.M. Popov. The composition of the army on formation was:

- 87th Rifle Division
- 7th Tank Corps
- 23rd Tank Corps, all from the reserves of Stalingrad Front;
- 300th Rifle Division
- 315th Rifle Division, both from 51st Army;
- 4th Mechanized Corps, from 57th Army;
- 4th Guards Rifle Division
- 258th Rifle Division
- 3rd Guards Cavalry Corps, all from 5th Tank Army;
- Additional artillery and support units.

After the German 6th Army was encircled at Stalingrad it was apparent to both sides that there were two possible routes that a German relief operation could follow: from the west from the area of the confluence of the Don and Chir Rivers; or from the southwest from the area around Kotelnikovo. As the distance from the west was significantly shorter than from the southwest, 5th Shock was formed specifically to counter the former threat, which it successfully carried out over the next two weeks.

== Operational history ==
=== 1942–1943 ===
Assigned to the Stalingrad Front, on 26 December 1942 the unit participated in Operation Saturn. Its composition on 1 January 1943 was as follows:

4th Guards Rifle Division
258th Rifle Division
315th Rifle Division
5th Destroyer Brigade
3rd Guards Cavalry Corps

5th Guards Cavalry Division
6th Guards Cavalry Division
32nd Cavalry Division
152nd Mortar Regiment
8th Cavalry Artillery Battalion
3rd Guards Tank Destroyer Battalion

274th Howitzer Artillery Regiment
331st Howitzer Artillery Regiment
1162nd Gun Artillery Regiment
507th Tank Destroyer Regiment
764th Tank Destroyer Regiment
21st Guards Mortar Regiment
1068th Anti-aircraft Artillery Regiment (2nd Anti-aircraft Artillery Division)
258th Engineer Battalion
827th Engineer Battalion

Transferred to the new Southern Front (the former Stalingrad Front), the army took part in the Salsk-Rostov Offensive as part of the 4th Ukrainian Front. In August 1943, it finally succeeded in breaking through the German Mius-Front defensive line on the river Mius, after which it participated in the Melitopol Offensive during the Battle of the Dnieper.

On 1 August 1943, the army was composed of the following formations:

31st Guards Rifle Corps

4th Guards Rifle Division
34th Guards Rifle Division
40th Guards Rifle Division

96th Guards Rifle Division
126th Rifle Division
127th Rifle Division
221st Rifle Division
315th Rifle Division
1st Guards Destroyer Brigade
506th Gun Artillery Regiment
1162nd Gun Artillery Regiment
331st Howitzer Artillery Regiment
8th Anti-tank Artillery Brigade
15th Anti-tank Artillery Brigade
491st Tank Destroyer Regiment
507th Tank Destroyer Regiment
489th Mortar Regiment
15th Anti-aircraft Artillery Division

342nd Anti-aircraft Artillery Regiment
723rd Anti-aircraft Artillery Regiment
1264th Anti-aircraft Artillery Regiment

1617th Anti-aircraft Artillery Regiment
32nd Guards Tank Brigade
22nd Separate Guards Tank Regiment
28th Armored Train Battalion
43rd Special-Designation Engineer Brigade
258th Engineer Battalion
827th Engineer Battalion

=== 1944 ===
In 1944, as part of the 3rd Ukrainian Front, the army took part in the liberation of the Right-Bank Ukraine and in the Jassy–Kishinev Offensive. On 1 August 1944, the unit consisted of the following formations:

10th Guards Rifle Corps

49th Guards Rifle Division
86th Guards Rifle Division
109th Guards Rifle Division

32nd Rifle Corps

60th Guards Rifle Division
295th Rifle Division
416th Rifle Division

248th Rifle Division
266th Rifle Division
44th Guards Gun Artillery Brigade
92nd Corps Artillery Regiment
507th Tank Destroyer Regiment
521st Tank Destroyer Regiment
489th Mortar Regiment
1617th Anti-aircraft Artillery Regiment
61st Engineer-Sapper Brigade

In early September the army was transferred to the Reserve of the Supreme High Command, relocated to the area of Kovel, in Ukraine, and on 30 October 1944 it was transferred to the 1st Belorussian Front.

=== 1945 ===
In 1945, the army took part in the Warsaw-Poznan Offensive and Berlin Strategic Offensive operations. During the final assault on Berlin the army was heavily reinforced and composed of:

Rifle

26th Guards Rifle Corps

89th Guards Rifle Division
94th Guards Rifle Division
266th Rifle Division

9th Rifle Corps

230th Rifle Division
248th Rifle Division
301st Rifle Division

32nd Rifle Corps

60th Guards Rifle Division
295th Rifle Division
416th Rifle Division

Artillery

6th Artillery Penetration Corps

2nd Artillery Penetration Division

20th Light Artillery Brigade
16th Guards Gun Artillery Brigade
4th Guards Heavy Howitzer Artillery Brigade
121st High-Power Howitzer Artillery Brigade
5th Mortar Brigade
68th Artillery Reconnaissance Battalion

14th Artillery Penetration Division

169th Light Artillery Brigade
172nd Howitzer Artillery Brigade
176th Heavy Howitzer Artillery Brigade
122nd High-Power Howitzer Artillery Brigade
21st Heavy Mortar Brigade
24th Mortar Brigade
6th Guards Mortar Brigade

112th Artillery Reconnaissance Battalion

44th Guards Cannon Artillery Brigade
97th Heavy Howitzer Artillery Brigade (22nd Artillery Penetration Division)
124th Howitzer Artillery Brigade
32nd Special-power Artillery Battalion
322nd Special-power Artillery Battalion
331st Special-power Artillery Battalion
3rd Guards Anti-tank Artillery Brigade
4th Guards Anti-tank Artillery Brigade
39th Anti-tank Artillery Brigade
507th Tank Destroyer Regiment
35th Guards Mortar Brigade
32nd Mortar Brigade (22nd Artillery Penetration Division)
6th Heavy Mortar Brigade (22nd Artillery Penetration Division)
489th Mortar Regiment
2nd Guards Mortar Brigade
25th Guards Mortar Brigade
41st Guards Mortar Brigade (22nd Artillery Penetration Division)
37th Guards Mortar Regiment
92nd Guards Mortar Regiment
2nd Guards Anti-Aircraft Artillery Division

302nd Guards Anti-aircraft Artillery Regiment
303rd Guards Anti-aircraft Artillery Regiment
304th Guards Anti-aircraft Artillery Regiment
306th Guards Anti-aircraft Artillery Regiment

1617th Anti-aircraft Artillery Regiment
4th Separate Artillery Observation Balloon Battalion

Armor and Engineers

11th Tank Corps

20th Tank Brigade
36th Tank Brigade
65th Tank Brigade
12th Motorized Rifle Brigade
50th Guards Heavy Tank Regiment
1071st Light Artillery Regiment
1461st SU Regiment
1493rd SU Regiment
93rd Motorcycle Battalion
243rd Mortar Regiment
115th Guards Mortar Battalion
1388th Anti-aircraft Artillery Regiment

220th Tank Brigade
11th Guards Heavy Tank Brigade
67th Guards Heavy Tank Brigade
92nd Engineer Tank Regiment
396th Guards Heavy SU Regiment
1504th SU Regiment
61st Engineer-Sapper Brigade
8th Flamethrower Battalion

== Post-war occupation ==
The army took part in the Berlin Victory Parade of 1945. The 5th Shock Army was then assigned occupation duties in eastern Germany and was responsible for securing the Berlin area. When the Group of Soviet Occupation Forces in Germany was formed the army was composed of:

- 9th Rifle Corps
  - 248th Rifle Division
  - 301st Rifle Division

- 26th Guards Rifle Corps
  - 89th Guards Rifle Division
  - 94th Guards Rifle Division
  - 266th Rifle Division
- 32nd Rifle Corps

- 60th Guards Rifle Division
- 295th Rifle Division
- 416th Rifle Division

- 230th Rifle Division
- three Separate Tank Brigades

The army was disbanded in December 1946.

== Commanders ==
- Lieutenant General Markian Popov: (December 1942)
- Lieutenant General Vyacheslav Tsvetayev (Colonel General, Sept 1943): (December 1942 – May 1944)
- Lieutenant General Nikolai Berzarin (Colonel General, April 1945): (May 1944 – 16 June 1945) (died while Berlin Commandant)
- Colonel General Alexander Gorbatov: (June 1945 – 1946)
