= 74th Anti-Aircraft Artillery Division =

- Active: October 1943–c. 1950s
- Country: Soviet Union
- Branch: Red Army (later Soviet Army)
- Type: Anti-Aircraft Artillery
- Engagements: World War II
- Decorations: Order of Bogdan Khmelnitsky 2nd class

The 74th Anti-Aircraft Artillery Division (Russian: 74-я зенитная артиллерийская дивизия) was an anti-aircraft artillery division of the Soviet Union's Red Army (later the Soviet Army) during World War II and the early postwar period.

Formed in late 1943, the division remained in the Moscow Military District until January 1945, when it was sent to the front. The 74th fought in the East Prussian Offensive and the Berlin Offensive in the final months of the war, and was disbanded by the end of the 1950s.

== World War II ==
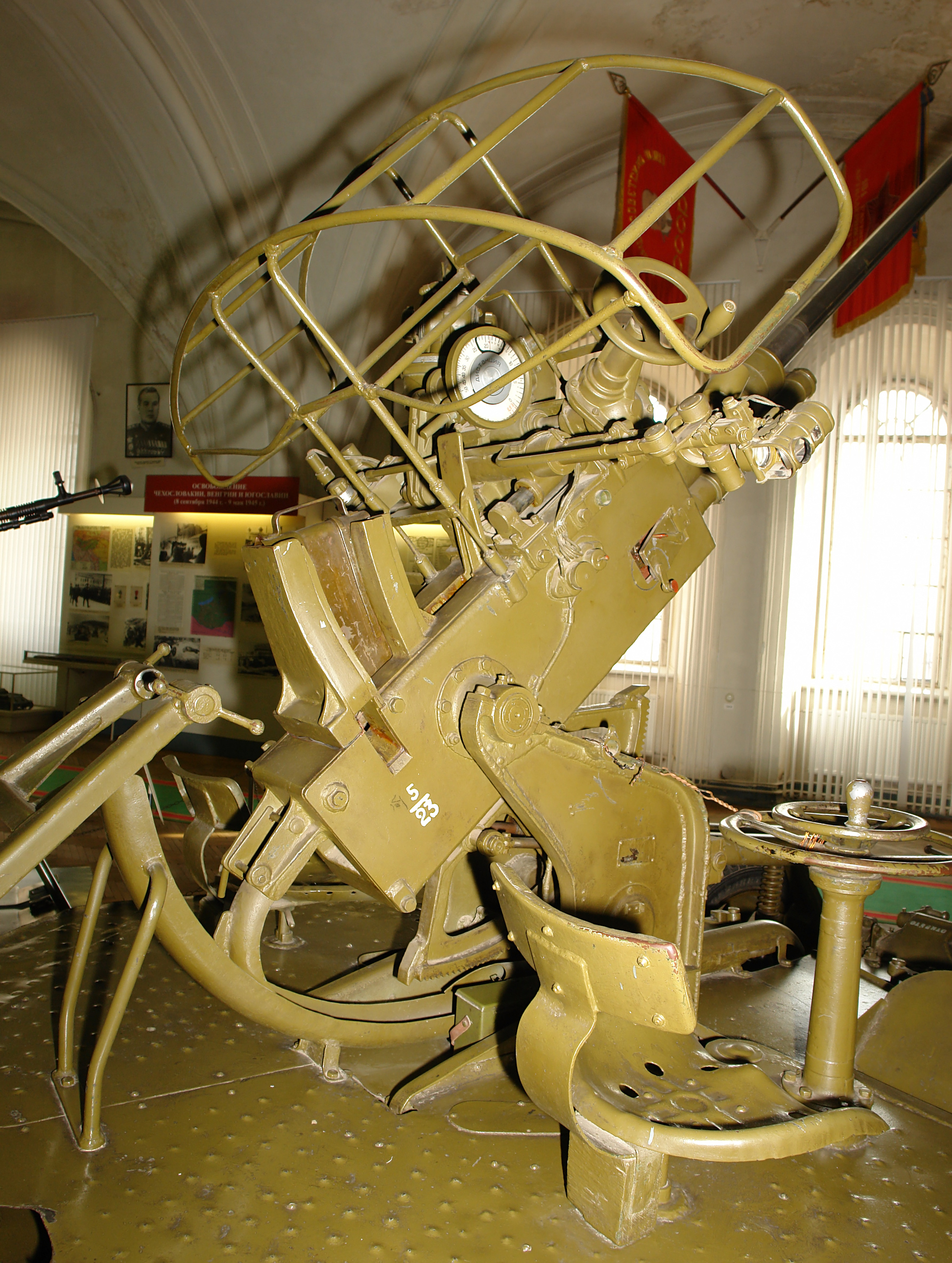
A 37 mm AA gun of the type used by the division during World War II

The division began forming around 18 October 1943, when Major Nikolay Konev was assigned commander. It included the 445th, 457th, 498th, and 499th Anti-Aircraft Artillery Regiments, and was part of the Moscow Military District. The division trained at the Moscow Anti-Aircraft Artillery Training Camp in Kuntsevo, and had three regiments of light guns and one regiment of heavy guns. Colonel Nikolay Nikitin was assigned acting commander on 29 November 1943. The division provided air defense for Moscow. In February 1944, the division relocated to a camp at Kosteryovo. On 22 March Nikitin was replaced by Colonel Nikolay Marchenko. The 74th continued training at the Moscow Anti-Aircraft Artillery Training Camp. On 11 August Marchenko was replaced by Colonel Irodion Mikhailov, who commanded it for the rest of the war. The division continued forming at Kosteryovo.

In January 1945 it was sent to the front as part of the 2nd Belorussian Front's 70th Army, fighting in the East Prussian Offensive. From the end of February, the 74th fought with the 1st Belorussian Front's 5th Shock Army, and from April covered the 47th Army. As part of the latter, the division fought in the Berlin Offensive. For "successful fulfillment of command assignments" in the Berlin Offensive, the division was awarded the Order of Bogdan Khmelnitsky, 2nd class, on 28 May, and one of its regiments received the Order of Kutuzov, 3rd class.

== Postwar ==
Marchenko continued to command the division until December 1945, when he was transferred to command the 4th Guards Anti-Aircraft Artillery Division. The division was among those anti-aircraft artillery divisions disbanded without being converted into another unit by the end of the 1950s.
