= 74th Regiment =

74th Regiment or 74th Infantry Regiment may refer to:

- 74th Infantry Regiment (Poland), a unit of the Polish Army
- 74th Regiment of Foot (disambiguation), several units of the British Army
- 74th (Essex Fortress) Anti-Aircraft Battalion, Royal Engineers, British air defence unit
- 74th Infantry Regiment (United States), former infantry unit of the US Army

== American Civil War ==
- 74th Illinois Infantry Regiment, a unit of the Union (Northern) Army
- 74th Indiana Infantry Regiment, a unit of the Union (Northern) Army
- 74th New York Infantry Regiment, a unit of the Union (Northern) Army
- 74th Ohio Infantry Regiment, a unit of the Union (Northern) Army
- 74th Pennsylvania Infantry Regiment, a unit of the Union (Northern) Army

== See also ==
- 74th Division (disambiguation)
- 74 Squadron
