= 127th Rifle Division (May 1943 formation) =

127th Rifle Division (3rd formation)
- Active: May 1943 – June 1945
- Country: Soviet Union
- Branch: Red Army / Soviet Army
- Type: Infantry
- Engagements: World War II
- Decorations: Order of the Red Banner; Order of Kutuzov
- Battle honours: Chistyakov

The May 1943 formation of the 127th Rifle Division was an infantry division of the Red Army, the third unit to bear the designation during World War II.

== History ==
The 127th Rifle Division was formed on 10 May 1943 from the 52nd and 98th Separate Rifle Brigades, part of the 28th Army of the Southern Front. The division included the 547th, 549th, and 555th Rifle Regiments, the 1034th Artillery Regiment, and smaller elements, reusing the numbers of previous formations of the 127th. Colonel Fyodor Maximovich Rukhlenko, deputy commander of the 315th Rifle Division, was appointed commander. On 6 August, for "making a false report on the combat actions of the division," Rukhlenko was relieved of command. The division was part of the 28th Army on 9 August when Colonel Margazian Galliulovich Krymov, commander of the 387th Rifle Division of the army, transferred to command it. The division went on the offensive against the German fortified Mius-Front on 24 August in the region of Saur-Mogila, the key to the German defense of the Donbass. After capturing Saur-Mogila, the division captured Chistyakovo on 2 September and Gorlovka on 4 September. On 8 September, for distinguishing itself in the battles for the capture of the Donbass the division received the name of Chistyakovo as an honorific. Continuing the offensive, the division fought its way to the Dnieper. The division was pulled from the front on 21 September and two days later transferred to the Reserve of the Supreme High Command. The 127th, as part of the 1st Guards Army, arrived on the 1st Ukrainian Front in the Kiev region on 12 November. In early December, Krymov was relieved of command of the division for "poor leadership and lack of care for the living conditions and supply of personnel." Lieutenant Colonel Vladimir Ivanovich Katrich, deputy commander of the 328th Rifle Division of the army, temporarily commanded the division from 12 December to 11 January 1944, leading it in the Zhitomir–Berdichev offensive. During the offensive, the division participated in the capture of Zhitomir as part of the 1st Guards Army.

Colonel Ivan Pavlovich Govorov, deputy commander of the 99th Rifle Division of the army, took command of the 127th on 12 January. At the time, the division was on the defensive near Kraspol. From March the division successfully fought in the Proskurov–Chernovitsy Offensive. For the capture of Proskurov, the division was awarded the Order of the Red Banner on 3 April. From 19 July the division fought in the Lvov–Sandomierz offensive, during which it fought in the capture of Berezhany, Rogatin, Khodorov, and Zhidechuv. From 5 August the division was in reserve and fought in the suppression of Banderites in the rear of the 1st Ukrainian Front. Major General Semyon Ivanovich Mladentsev took command of the 127th on 25 September. In October, the division fought in the final stage of the Battle of the Dukla Pass as part of the 38th Army. Its units attacked from the north of the fortified point of Polyany, ensuring the capture of Dukla Pass. On 30 October the division was pulled out of the fight, then from 29 November joined the 3rd Guards Army in the defense of the Sandomierz bridgehead.

From January 1945 the 127th attacked during the Vistula–Oder, Sandomierz–Silesian, Lower Silesian, and Berlin Offensives. On 25 April Mladentsev was transferred to serve as deputy commander of the 120th Rifle Corps, and Colonel Nikolai Viktorovich Krasovsky, commander of the 197th Rifle Division of the army, took command of the 127th. During the Berlin Offensive, the division broke through German defenses on the Neisse and Spree, fighting in the destruction of the Halbe pocket in the region of Luckenwalde. The division ended the war in the Prague offensive and for its "exemplary completion of combat missions, valor and courage" during the capture of Prague was awarded the Order of Kutuzov, 2nd class, on 4 June. On the same day, the three rifle regiments and artillery regiment of the division were awarded the Order of Alexander Nevsky and the 411th Separate Anti-Tank Battalion the Order of the Red Star for their contributions to the destruction of the Halbe pocket.

After the end of the war, the division was disbanded in June.
