= Monument to Alexander II (disambiguation) =

- Monument to Alexander II (Moscow)
- Monument to Alexander II (Shakhty)
- Monument to Alexander II (Yuzovka)
- Alexander II Column in Odesa
- Monument to Alexander II (Kyiv)
