= The Shakhty Museum of local lore =

Museum in Shakhty, Rostov, Russia

Coordinates: 47.710012°N 40.207326°E

- Established: 1966
- Location: Shevchenko str., 149
- Director: Proskurova Nina Georgievna

The Shakhty Museum of local lore (Russian: Шахтинский краеведческий музей) is a museum in the city of Shakhty, Rostov Region of Russia. The Museum building is an architectural monument of the late nineteenth century. The Museum was founded in 1966, opened on May 18, 1967.

== History ==
The Museum is located in the center of Shakhty.

== Design ==
The Central room of the building features high domed ceilings, creating an atmosphere of antiquity.

== Contents ==
Five thematic halls are in the Museum. Two are devoted to the Great Patriotic war including weapons, soldiers' personal belongings, photos and documents. On November 12, 2015 the Museum emptied a burned-down building dedicated to the coal industry and moved its contents to the local history Museum.
