= St. Nicholas' Church (Shakhty) =

Church in Rostov Oblast, Russia

- Церковь Николая Чудотворца
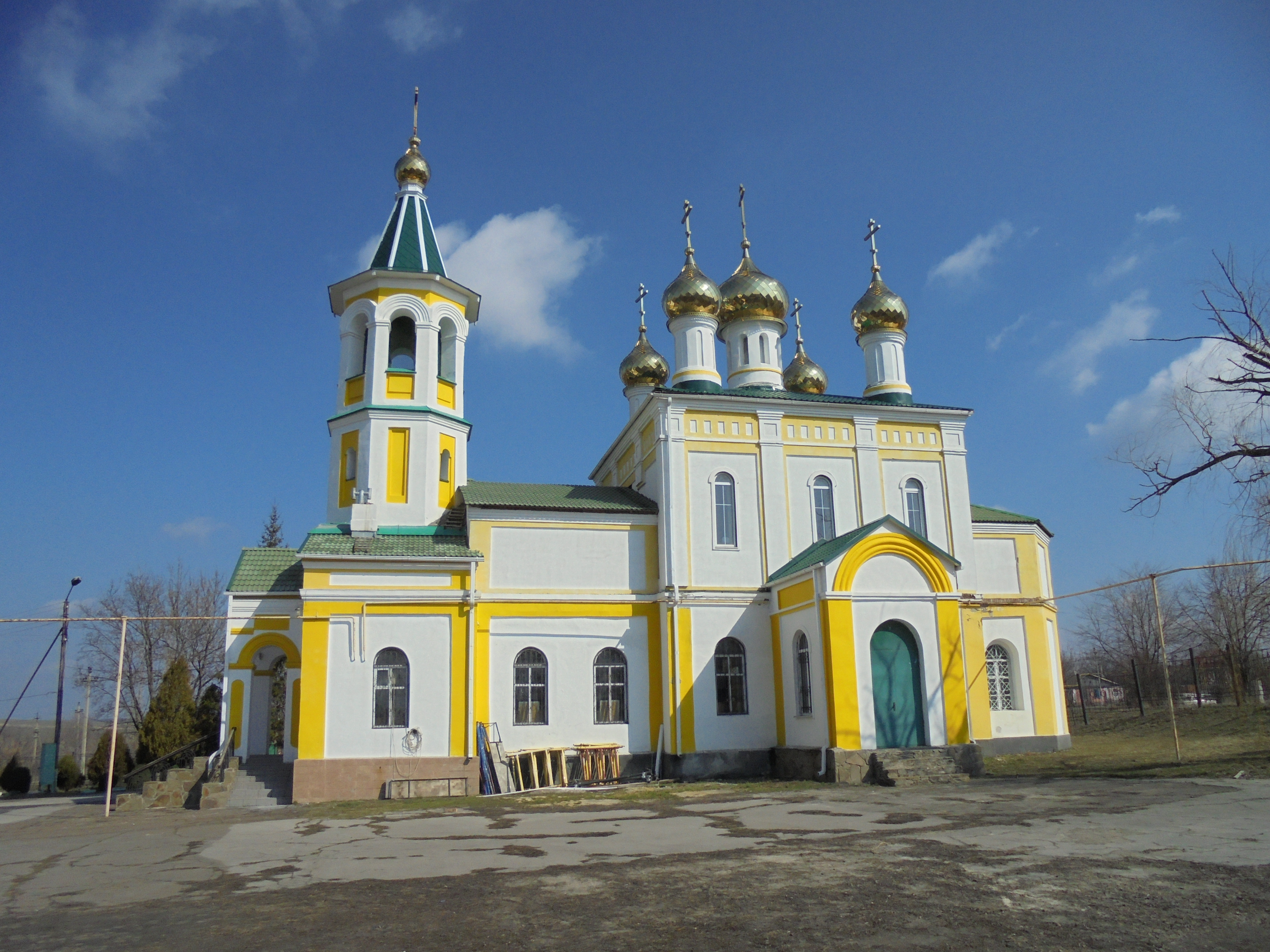
- St. Nicholas' Church
- 47°45′56″N 40°08′20″E
- Location: Shakhty, Rostov Oblast, Russia
- Country: Russia
- Denomination: Eastern Orthodox

History
- Status: Parish church
- Dedication: Saint Nicholas

Architecture
- Functional status: Active
- Completed: 1902

Administration
- Division: Patriarchate of Moscow and All Russia

The Saint Nicholas Church (Russian: Церковь Николая Чудотворца) is a Russian Orthodox church in Shakhty, Rostov Oblast, Russia.

== History ==
External image
- St. Nicholas Church in 2014

In 1902, at the initiative of the inhabitants of Ayutinsky settlement a church dedicated to St. Nicholas was built. In 1903 it was consecrated. The church had one altar, three domes and a bell tower:

January 1, 1903. The Decree of His Imperial Majesty the Autocrat of All the Russias Nicholas II and the Holy Governmental Synod: According to the presentation of His Eminence Athanasius the Archbishop of Don and Novocherkassk, the Holy Synod defines that the newly-constructed St. Nicholas in Vlasovo-Ayutinsky khutor of Cherkassy District must have an independent parish with priest and the psalm-reader being staff-clergy, and their alimony must be paid exclusively on local funds.

On November 3, in Vlasovo-Ayutinsky khutor the consecration festives took place.

After the Russian Revolution, the church was closed, but not destroyed, as country club was opened inside it. Only in 1991 did the renovated St. Nicholas Church resume its functioning. The new church has five domes, which in 2012 were consecrated by Bishop Ignatius.
