= 296th Division =

296th Division may refer to:

- 296th Infantry Division, Wehrmacht, Germany
- 296th Rifle Division, Soviet Union

== See also ==
- List of military divisions by number
