= Dmitry Monakhov =

Soviet major general (1900–1944)

Dmitry Petrovich Monakhov
- Monakhov, 1943
- Born: 3 May 1900; Filippovo, Yaroslavl Governorate, Russian Empire
- Died: 18 February 1944 (aged 43) Dnipropetrovsk, Soviet Union
- Allegiance: Russian SFSR; Soviet Union
- Branch: Red Army
- Service years: 1918–1944
- Rank: Major general
- Commands: 130th Rifle Division; 278th Rifle Division (became 60th Guards Rifle Division); 28th Guards Rifle Corps
- Conflicts: Russian Civil War; Polish–Soviet War; World War II (DOW)
- Awards: Order of the Red Banner (2); Order of Suvorov, 2nd class; Order of the Patriotic War, 1st class

Dmitry Petrovich Monakhov (Russian: Дми́трий Петро́вич Мона́хов; 3 May 1900 – 18 February 1944) was a Red Army major general who held division and corps command before being killed in World War II.

Monakhov rose to platoon commander during the Russian Civil War and held command and staff positions in Ukraine between the wars. A division chief of staff when Operation Barbarossa began, Monakhov soon became acting commander and in late 1941 took command of the 278th Rifle Division. He led the latter in the Battle of Stalingrad, after which it was converted into the 60th Guards Rifle Division for its actions. Monakhov continued to command the division in the advance west into Ukraine during 1943 and in early 1944 became commander of the 28th Guards Rifle Corps. While leading the latter in the Nikopol–Krivoi Rog Offensive in February, he was mortally wounded.

== Early life and Russian Civil War ==
Dmitry Petrovich Monakhov was born on 3 May 1900 in the village of Filippovo, Yaroslavl Governorate, now in Lyubimsky District of Yaroslavl Oblast. Conscripted into the Red Army in August 1918 during the Russian Civil War, he was sent to the Moscow Workers' Regiment. In late January 1919 Monakhov went with the regiment to Chernigov, and in February a special purpose detachment was formed from the regiment to suppress anti-Soviet forces. In April the detachment was transferred to Poltava, where Monakhov became a cadet at the Poltava Command Course later that month. With the latter, he fought in battles against the Armed Forces of South Russia from Poltava to Kharkov. Wounded and captured in August during the Soviet retreat, Monakhov escaped in December and after reaching Soviet lines was assigned to the 398th Rifle Regiment of the 45th Rifle Division.

With the latter, he served as a Red Army man before graduating from the divisional school in 1920 to become a platoon commander. Monakhov fought in battles against the Armed Forces of South Russia in Right-bank Ukraine, the disarmament of the Revolutionary Insurrectionary Army of Ukraine in the Alexandrovsk area, and in the Odessa Operation. In spring and summer 1920 he fought in the Polish–Soviet War in the advance on Kiev, Shepetovka, and Lvov. In November he fought with the division in the elimination of the Ukrainian People's Army and remnants of the Army of Wrangel in western Ukraine, after which the division suppressed anti-Soviet forces in Ukraine.

== Interwar period ==
After the end of the war, Monakhov became a platoon commander in the training regiment of the 133rd Brigade of the division, then held the same position with a destroyer detachment at Poltava. Transferred to the 7th Rifle Division in August, Monakhov became a platoon commander in its 59th Rifle Regiment and an assistant company commander in its 20th Rifle Regiment. From October 1923 he studied at the Kiev Combined Higher Military School. Upon his graduation a year later, he returned to the 20th Regiment to command a training platoon and company, then became assistant commander and commander of a battalion.

Monakhov served as assistant chief of staff of the 19th Rifle Regiment from April 1931 and in October of that year transferred to serve as chief of staff of the 50th Separate Machine Gun Battalion. In February 1936 he was appointed chief of staff of the 261st Rifle Regiment of the 87th Rifle Division before rising to command the 295th Rifle Regiment at Mogilev-Podolsky in March 1938. By now a colonel, Monakhov was appointed chief of the 10th department of the staff of the Vinnytsia Army Group of Forces in November of that year and in August 1939 became chief of staff of the 135th Rifle Division. With the latter, he participated in the Soviet invasion of Poland. Monakhov transferred to hold the same position with the 130th Rifle Division, and completed a class of the correspondence department of the Frunze Military Academy in 1941.

== World War II ==
After Operation Barbarossa began, Monakhov succeeded to command of the division in July. During the border battles the division fought as part of the 55th Rifle Corps, which joined the 18th Army in fighting in the Mogilev-Podolsk Fortified Region and on the Dniester, then retreated towards Olgopol. In October he was sent to study at the Academy of the General Staff, but a month later was back at the disposal of the Southern Front. In late December he became commander of the 471st Rifle Division, quickly renumbered as the 278th, forming at Yelan near Stalingrad.

Monakhov's division was sent to the 38th Army of the Southwestern Front in late May and fought in the defense of the Donbas near Kupiansk against the German advance in Case Blue. In July the division fought in fierce defensive battles, covering the retreat of the army headquarters and ensuring its crossing of the Don near Kletskaya. Transferred to the 21st Army on 23 July, the 278th defended positions on the left bank of the Don, covering a wide front and fighting to expand a bridgehead on the right bank in the area of Raspopinskaya and Kletskaya. Monakhov was awarded his first Order of the Red Banner on 5 November for his leadership of the division in this sector. With the 3rd Guards Army, the division fought in Operation Little Saturn and on 3 January 1943 was converted into the 60th Guards Rifle Division in recognition of its "courage and heroism" in the latter. Two days later, Monakhov was promoted to major general.

Monakhov continued to command the division in Operation Gallop during January and February. In late February the division joined the 1st Guards Army and fought in the Barvenkovo area. Withdrawn to the army reserve in May, the division then fought in battles for the Izyum bridgehead in mid-July. From August 1943, the division, with the 8th Guards Army and then the 12th Army, fought in the Donbas Strategic Offensive, the Zaporozhye Offensive, and the Battle of the Dnieper. Monakhov's division was decorated twice and on 4 November joined the 6th Army of the 3rd Ukrainian Front. His performance in these evaluated by his superior as demonstrating the ability "to remain calm in the most difficult conditions" and to "make the correct decisions, while also "correctly organizing combined arms cooperation." He became deputy commander of the 28th Guards Rifle Corps on 29 December 1943 and succeeded to command of it on 19 January 1944. During the Nikopol–Krivoi Rog Offensive, Monakhov was severely wounded around 13:00 on 12 February in a German air raid on the road southeast of Malo-Vorontsevka as the corps attacked Apostolovo. He died of his wounds on 17 February 1944 at an evacuation hospital in Dnipropetrovsk, where he was buried. Monakhov was recommended for the Order of Lenin but this was downgraded and instead he was posthumously awarded the Order of the Patriotic War, 1st class on 19 March for his leadership of the corps.

== Awards ==
Monakhov was a recipient of the following decorations:

- Order of the Red Banner (5 November 1942, 25 February 1943)
- Order of Suvorov, 2nd class (26 October 1943)
- Order of the Patriotic War, 1st class (19 March 1944)
- Jubilee Medal "XX Years of the Workers' and Peasants' Red Army" (1938)
