= Monument to Alexander II (Yuzovka) =

Russian monument

Coordinates: 48.0102°N 37.8075°E

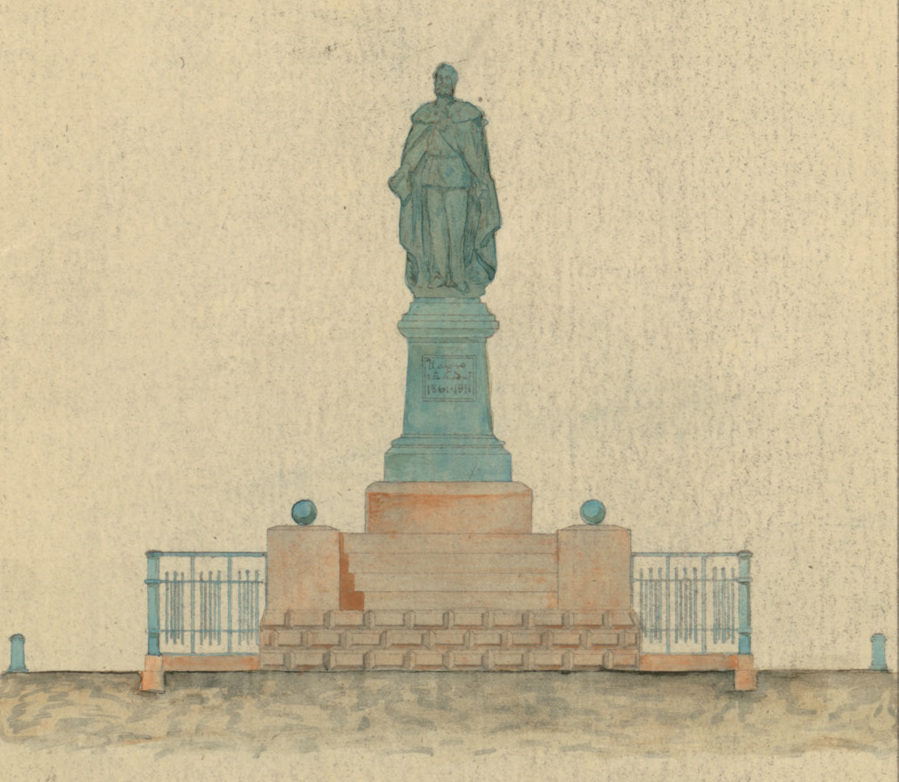
Monument to Emperor Alexander II in Yuzovka

The Monument to Alexander II (Ukrainian: Пам'ятник Олександру II, translit.: Pamyatnyk Oleksandru II), is a memorial of Emperor Alexander II of Russia, situated in the immediate surroundings of the Transfiguration Cathedral in Donetsk. Completed in 1916 and it is the first monument of Donetsk (former Yuzovka).

== History ==
Preparations for the installation of the monument began in 1911 to celebrate the fiftieth anniversary of the abolition of serfdom in the Russian Empire. It was decided to set the date of the monument to Alexander II in major Russian cities. November 22, 1911 permission was granted to allocate part of the market square for the installation of the monument. In January 1912, Nikolay Nikolayevich Gavrilov and Nikolai Gavrilovich Esipov made with the project of the monument in Yuzovka. The author of the project was Nikolai Gavrilov. December 12, 1913 was made an art examination of the project at the Academy of Fine Arts. The experts were L. Benoit, Chizhov and Kotov. Two weeks later, the experts gave a response that allowed the monument to be installed, though noted the low artistic merit of the pedestal.

The pedestal of the monument was the height of 5.8 meters and is made of sandstone. Statue of Alexander II was 2.2 meters tall and is made of zinc.

Work on the installation of the monument began in the spring of 1916. Leaders work on the installation of the monument was carried out by the Department of General Affairs of the Ministry of the Interior. In July 1916, a few days before the opening of the monument collapsed.

== versions of collapse ==
The article Viktor Shutov "Failed holiday", which was published in 1987 in the newspaper "Evening Donetsk" states that the monument blown Bolshevik underground.

The explosion of the monument is also mentioned in the novel Grigoriy Volodin "Wild Field" (the monument there named monument to Alexander III, and his story undermined by anarchists).

Valery Styopkin in his book "An Illustrated History of Yuzovka and Stalin-Donetsk" calls into question the version of the explosion. He notes that it is not found in the archives of the police reports of an explosion. He also leads two of his version of what happened. According to one, the destruction was due to internal stress of the metal, as zinc is not suitable for the creation of monuments, and the monument was made of zinc. In the second version, under the base of the monument was abandoned mine and, as a consequence, he settled down and destroyed.
