= Monument to Taras Shevchenko (Shakhty) =

- Russian: Памятник Тарасу Шевченко
- Interactive map of Monument to Taras Shevchenko
- Location: Shakhty, Rostov Oblast, Russia
- Opening date: 1972

Monument to Taras Shevchenko is a monument which is mounted in the town Shakhty in the Rostov region in memory of the Ukrainian poet and prose writer Taras Grigorievich Shevchenko.

== History ==
In 1972, at the entrance to the Aleksandrovsky Park in Shakhty, Rostov Region, a monument to TG Shevchenko was opened, but in the early 1990s it was dismantled and a fountain appeared in its place. Here is how the local newspaper described the opening of the monument on March 18, 1972.

"Taras Shevchenko Street is one of the oldest in our city. For many thousands of human destinies it was the beginning of their biography. Previously, it was called Steppe, because right off behind the steppe itself was extended. Then – Pushkin’s street, but most of Shakhtintsy remember it as Shevchenko street.

And today a monument to Taras Grigorievich Shevchenko is erected. Created on the initiative and due to the fund of inhabitants of the Leninsky district (earned on subbotniks), this monument is a symbol of the indestructible brotherhood of two nations - Russian and Ukrainian.

== Present-day Monument ==
In 2011, an initiative group of Shakhtin inhabitants appealed to the city administration with a request for restoration of the monument. The idea was supported by the mayor of the city. All financial issues for putting in order the bust and its installation were solved at the expense of the deputies of the City Duma, the administration and the citizens themselves. In 2012, the monument to the poet was restored, but in a new place - near the museum of local lore, located along Shevchenko Street, 149. During solemn events the opening of the restored monument of Shevchenko Mayor of the city of Shakhty made the following speech:

"I really hope that everyone attending the opening of the monument to T.G. Shevchenko, will open new facets of his creation or will just begin to get acquainted with his great literary works"

In 2014, the monument was celebrated solemn events in Shakhty which were dedicated to the 200th anniversary of the birth of the Ukrainian poet.
