= 278th Rifle Division =

Soviet Union era military unit

- Active: July – Dec. 1941 (1st formation); Jan. 1942 – Jan. 1943 (2nd formation); July 1943 – fall 1945 (3rd formation)
- Country: Soviet Union
- Branch: Red Army
- Type: Rifle division
- Engagements: World War II
- Battle honours: Khingan (2nd formation)

The 278th Rifle Division (Russian: 278-я стрелковая дивизия) was an infantry division of the Soviet Union's Red Army during World War II, formed three times.

The division was first formed in the summer of 1941 and destroyed in the Bryansk pocket in the fall of that year. Reformed in January 1942, the division's second formation became a guards' division for its actions in the Battle of Stalingrad. Formed a third time in the summer of 1943 in the Soviet Far East, the division fought in the Soviet invasion of Manchuria in August and September 1945 before being disbanded in the fall of that year.

== History ==
=== First Formation ===
The 278th began forming on 10 July 1941 at Livny in the Orel Military District. Its basic order of battle included the 851st, 853rd, and the 855th Rifle Regiments, as well as the 847th Artillery Regiment. On 15 August, the division was assigned to the 50th Army of the Bryansk Front. Just before Operation Typhoon, the German offensive on Moscow, began in late September, the division's 855th Rifle Regiment was detached to the 3rd Army. The division was destroyed in the Bryansk pocket that was created by the German advance by mid-October, and was officially disbanded on 27 December 1941.

=== Second Formation ===
The division's second formation was formed on 27 January 1942 from the 471st Rifle Division at Stalingrad in the Stalingrad Military District, under the command of Colonel Dmitry Monakhov. The 471st was originally formed on 20 December 1941. The new 278th's basic order of battle was the same as the previous formation. The division did not finish forming until the end of January, and in late April was transferred north to the Moscow Military District, possibly to complete its technical service support units from specialized training formations east of Moscow. After the Soviet disaster at the Second Battle of Kharkov in May, the 278th was hurriedly relocated south and assigned to the Southwestern Front's 38th Army. When Case Blue, the German summer offensive, began in late June, the division was forced to retreat along with the rest of the front. By late July, the 278th had been transferred to the 21st Army of the Stalingrad Front.

The division fought in the Battle of Stalingrad for the next several months, and when Operation Uranus, the Soviet counteroffensive, began, the 278th was part of the 1st Guards Army (2nd formation), which became the 3rd Guards Army on 5 December. After fighting in Operation Uranus, which trapped the German 6th Army in Stalingrad, the division fought in Operation Little Saturn, which aimed to prevent relief of the 6th Army. Just before the operation began, on 10 December, the division had a strength of 5,331 men, 1,360 rifles, 381 submachine guns, 31 light machine guns, 20 heavy machine guns, 127 mortars, 31 76mm guns, and 7 45mm guns, a little more than half strength. The division distinguished itself in the offensive, which destroyed the Italian Eighth Army and prevented German relief attempts. On 3 January 1943, it was converted into the 60th Guards Rifle Division.

=== Third Formation ===
The 278th was formed for a third time on 15 July 1943 in the Transbaikal Front, with the same basic order of battle as the previous division. The division was assigned to the 36th Army, but in July 1945 was transferred to the 17th Army. From 8 August to 3 September, the division fought in the Soviet invasion of Manchuria, advancing almost unopposed in the Khingan–Mukden Operation. For its actions, the division was awarded the honorific "Khingan." It was disbanded in the Transbaikal-Amur Military District after 1 October.
