= St. Alexander Nevsky Church (Shakhty) =

Church in Rostov Oblast, Russia

- Церковь Александра Невского
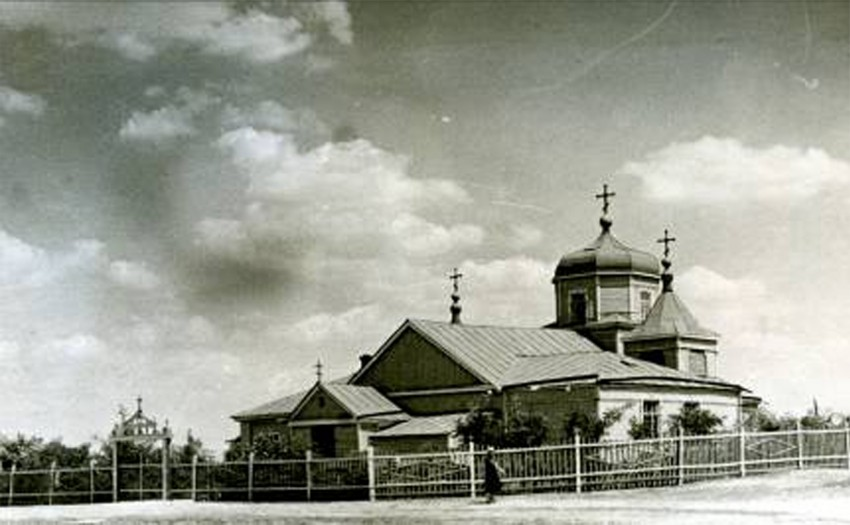
- St. Alexander Nevsky Church
- Location: Shakhty, Rostov Oblast, Russia
- Country: Russia
- Denomination: Russian Orthodox Church

History
- Status: Parish church
- Dedication: Saint Alexander Nevsky

Architecture
- Functional status: Destroyed
- Completed: 1888

The Saint Alexander Nevsky Church (Russian: Церковь Александра Невского) was a Russian Orthodox church in Shakhty, Rostov Oblast, Russia.

== History ==
The Saint Alexander Nevsky Church was built in 1888. The church was wooden and had only one altar. Its walls were painted inside in 1891. In 1906, a chapel in honor of the Ascension of the Lord was constructed and attached to the main building. According to 1896 data, in the church there were 2 priests, 1 deacon and 2 psalmists. The church parish included Ayutinsky, Novogrushevsky, Maksimovka and Popov settlements.

After the end of Civil War, in 1923, the St. Alexander Nevsky Church was closed, but then local authorities were forced to open it again shortly after, for their actions caused outrage of local dwellers. In 1938 the church was finally closed and destroyed.

On October 7, 2016, in Shakhty another Saint Alexander Nevsky Church was laid and now is being constructed. Religious services currently are held in a temporary accommodation. Its rector is Priest Georgy Bolotskov.
