= Memorial to the Victims of Fascism (Shakhty) =

- Location: Shakhty, Rostov Oblast, Russia
- Coordinates: 47.6854°N 40.2279°E

The Memorial to the Victims of Fascism is a monument in the city of Shakhty, Rostov Oblast, Russia.

== History ==
Shakhty was occupied by Nazi forces between 22 July 1942 and 12 February 1943 during the Great Patriotic War. The occupying forces attempted to establish their order in the city, but the townspeople resisted. Nazi efforts to quickly restore the city's coal industry were actively resisted by the miners. The Nazis began to arrest entire families of miners. Many townspeople were brought to a specially equipped site and shot, their bodies being dumped into the Krasin mine, some of them while still alive. On 5 October 1942, one of the leaders of the Shakhty underground, Ivan Timofeyevich Klimenko, was arrested. He was brought to the mine pit to be executed.

Before Klimenko could be executed, he announced "In the end, the Red Army will be victorious!", grabbed one of his guards, and jumped into the mineshaft, dragging the German with him. The same feat was accomplished by the underground worker Olga Andreyevna Meshkova. She had secretly returned to her home in the winter of 1942 to visit her children, but was tracked down and captured by the Gestapo. Before the execution, one of the Gestapo men wanted to take off her downy shawl. But Meshkova grabbed the man and with him threw herself down the mine shaft. The Palace of Culture at 23, Mikhailova Street now bears her name. During the occupation more than 3,500 townspeople were executed and dumped into the shafts of the Krasin mine.

== Memorial ==
On 10 March 1943, a resolution was passed to commemorate the Shakhty patriots. The first monument took the form of a wooden pyramid with a star at the site of the Krasin mine shaft. It was replaced in 1959 by an obelisk designed by S. F. Komarov, and in 1975 the present memorial was erected to mark the 30th anniversary of the end of the war. The memorial includes an eternal flame, lit by A. S. Sidelnikova, Olga Meshkova's daughter, and Nikolai Gudkov, the son of the Shakhty underground worker N. I. Gudkov.

=== Description ===
The memorial consists of two obelisks, between which is the 8-meter figure of a mourning miner. The obelisks symbolize the mine waste heap. The miner holds up a bowl in his hands, in which is the eternal flame. To the left of the sculptural group is the burial wall. There are miner's helmets in its niches. There is also a tombstone in memory of the victims of fascism, made of black labradorite. The designers of the memorial are the Rostov-on-Don architect R. A. Murodyan and the sculptor I. I. Reznichenko. The memorial complex to the Victims of Fascism is one of the largest mass graves in the territory of the Eastern Donbass.
