= Alexander Ryzhov =

Soviet Army General

- Born: 23 November 1895; Kuryanikha, Ivanovo Oblast, Russian Empire
- Died: 16 December 1950 (aged 55)
- Allegiance: Soviet Union
- Branch: Red Army
- Service years: 1915–1950
- Rank: Army General
- Commands: 296th Rifle Division; 56th Army; 18th Army; 46th Army; 47th Army; 37th Army; 4th Tank Army; 70th Army; 28th Guards Rifle Corps; 3rd Shock Army
- Conflicts: World War I Russian Civil War; World War II
- Awards: Hero of the Soviet Union

Alexander Ivanovitch Ryzhov (Russian: Александр Иванович Рыжов; 23 November 1895 – 16 December 1950) was a Soviet Army General during World War II and Hero of the Soviet Union.

== Biography ==
He was born on 23 November 1895 in the village of Kuryanikha in Ivanovo Oblast. He studied at Kineshma and worked at a notary office. He joined the army in 1915 during the First World War. He joined the Red Army in 1918 and took part in the Russian Civil War. In 1935, he studied at the Frunze Military Academy. From 1940 to 1941 he commanded the Rîbnița Fortified District in Odessa Military District.

During the Second World War, in September 1941, he commanded the 296th Rifle Division. From July 1942 to January 1943, he commanded the 56th Army in the northwestern Caucasus. From January to February 1943 he commanded the 18th Army, and between 6 February and 22 March 1943, the 46th Army. From March to July 1943, he commanded the 47th Army. In July 1943 he commanded the 37th Army. In July 1943, he commanded the 4th Tank Army. In March 1944, he commanded the 70th Army. At the head of the 28th Guards Rifle Corps, which he led until April 1949, his troops took the cities of Lublin and Poznań in July 1944.

He died in December 1950 in Moscow, at the head of the 3rd Shock Army.

== Decorations ==
- Order of Lenin
- Order of the Red Star
- Order of Kutuzov

== Sources ==
- Герои огненных лет. Книга 6. М.: Московский рабочий, 1983.
- Подвиг. 3-е издание, испр. и доп. Ярославль, 1980.
- Глава Висла из мемуаров В. И. Чуйкова.
- Ефимов В. Герой Висло-Одерской операции.— В кн.: Подвиг. Рассказы о Героях Сов. Союза. Изд. 2-е. Ярославль, 1972.
- Борзенко С. Герой с Малой земли. — В кн.: Политотдельцы. M. 1967.
- (http://www.generals.dk/general/Ryzhov/Aleksandr_Ivanovich/Soviet_Union.html)
