= Raspopinskaya =

Raspopinskaya Распопинская
- Stanitsa
- Location within Volgograd Oblast Location within Russia
- Coordinates: 49°24′N 42°51′E
- Country: Russia
- Region: Volgograd Oblast
- District: Kletsky District
- Time zone: UTC+4:00

Raspopinskaya (Russian: Распопинская) is a rural locality (a stanitsa) and the administrative center of Raskopinskoye Rural Settlement, Kletsky District, Volgograd Oblast, Russia. The population was 1,271 as of 2010. There are 28 streets.

== Geography ==
Raspopinskaya is located 20 km northwest of Kletskaya (the district's administrative centre) by road. Bazki is the nearest rural locality.
