= 28th Guards Rifle Corps =

The 28th Guards Rifle Corps (Russian: 28-й гвардейский стрелковый корпус) was an elite Guards rifle corps of the Red Army during World War II. It existed from 1943 to 1956.

== History ==
The corps headquarters was renamed from that of the 15th Rifle Corps (2nd formation) on 16 April 1943 and became part of the 8th Guards Army, which it served with for the rest of its existence. Its previous divisions were replaced with the 39th, 79th, and 88th Guards Rifle Divisions. The corps entered combat on the Southwestern Front on 19 July 1943 on the right bank of the Seversky Donets in the Izyum bridgehead. It fought in the Donbass Strategic Offensives in August and September, and in October fought in the elimination of the German bridgehead on the left bank of the Dnieper at the city of Zaporozhye, during the Zaporozhye Offensive. For its actions in the latter, the corps' 88th Guards Rifle Division received the name of the city as an honorific. On 24 October the corps crossed the Dnieper and on the next day the 39th Guards and the 152nd Rifle Division of the 46th Army captured Dnepropetrovsk. 15 soldiers of the corps were made Heroes of the Soviet Union for their actions in the fighting, among them Lieutenant Colonel Yu.M. Mazny, Captain V.A. Belyayev, Senior Sergeant V.S. Kashcheyev, and Sergeant A.I. Paradovich.

In the spring of 1944, the corps fought in the Bereznegovatoye–Snigirevka Offensive and the Odessa Offensive. For their actions in the breakthrough of Axis defenses on the Inhulets River, divisions of the corps were decorated. In April the corps defended the east bank of the Dniester Estuary, and in May replaced elements of the 5th Guards Army in the bridgehead on the right bank of the Dniester in the area of Grigoriopol. In June, the corps and the 8th Guards Army were shifted to the left wing of the 1st Belorussian Front. During the Lublin–Brest Offensive, the corps broke through German defenses west of Kovel, crossed the Western Bug, entered Polish territory, and captured Lublin on 24 July. For its "courage in these battles," the corps received the name of Lublin as an honorific on 9 August. On 1 August the forces of the corps crossed the Vistula and captured the Magnuszew bridgehead.

In the Warsaw–Poznan Offensive of January 1945, the corps attacked from the bridgehead on 14 January and advanced on Poznań. On 2 February, its units crossed the Oder near Reitwein, 10 km south of Kustrin, and in February and March fought to retain their bridgehead. For its "courage and heroism" in these operations the 28th Guards Corps was awarded the Order of the Red Banner on 19 February 1945 and corps commander Lieutenant General Alexander Ryzhov and corps artillery commander Colonel A.G. Timoshenko were made Heroes of the Soviet Union. The corps subsequently fought in the Berlin Offensive, during which they captured 11,000 German soldiers. For its actions the corps was awarded the Order of Suvorov, 2nd class, on 11 June, and all of its divisions received the Order of Lenin on 28 May.

== Commanders ==
- Gryaznov, Afanasy Sergeevich (1943), Guard major general;
- Guriev, Stepan Savelyevich (April 17, 1943 - December 29, 1943), Guard major general;
- Zalizyuk, Pyotr Iosifovich (December 30, 1943 - January 18, 1944), Guard Colonel, (temporary position);
- Monakhov, Dmitry Petrovich (January 19 - February 18, 1944), Guard major-general (mortally wounded in battle on February 18, 1944);
- Morozov, Stepan Ilyich (February 18 - July 1944), Major General, from March 1944, Lieutenant-General;
- Ryzhov, Alexander Ivanovich (July 10, 1944 - April 11, 1949), Guard major-general, from November 2, 1944 Guard-lieutenant general, Hero of the Soviet Union;
- Vedenin, Andrei Yakovlevich (April 11, 1949 - November 1, 1951), Guard general-major;
- Komarov, Vladimir Nikolaevich (November 1, 1951 - May 11, 1953), Guard major-general;
- Frolenkov, Andrei Grigorievich (July 1953 - June 1954), Guard general-major, from 31.05.1954 the Guard lieutenant-general;
