= Transfiguration Cathedral, Donetsk =

Eastern Orthodox church in Donetsk, Ukraine

Transfiguration Cathedral
- Holy Transfiguration Cathedral
- Преображенський собор
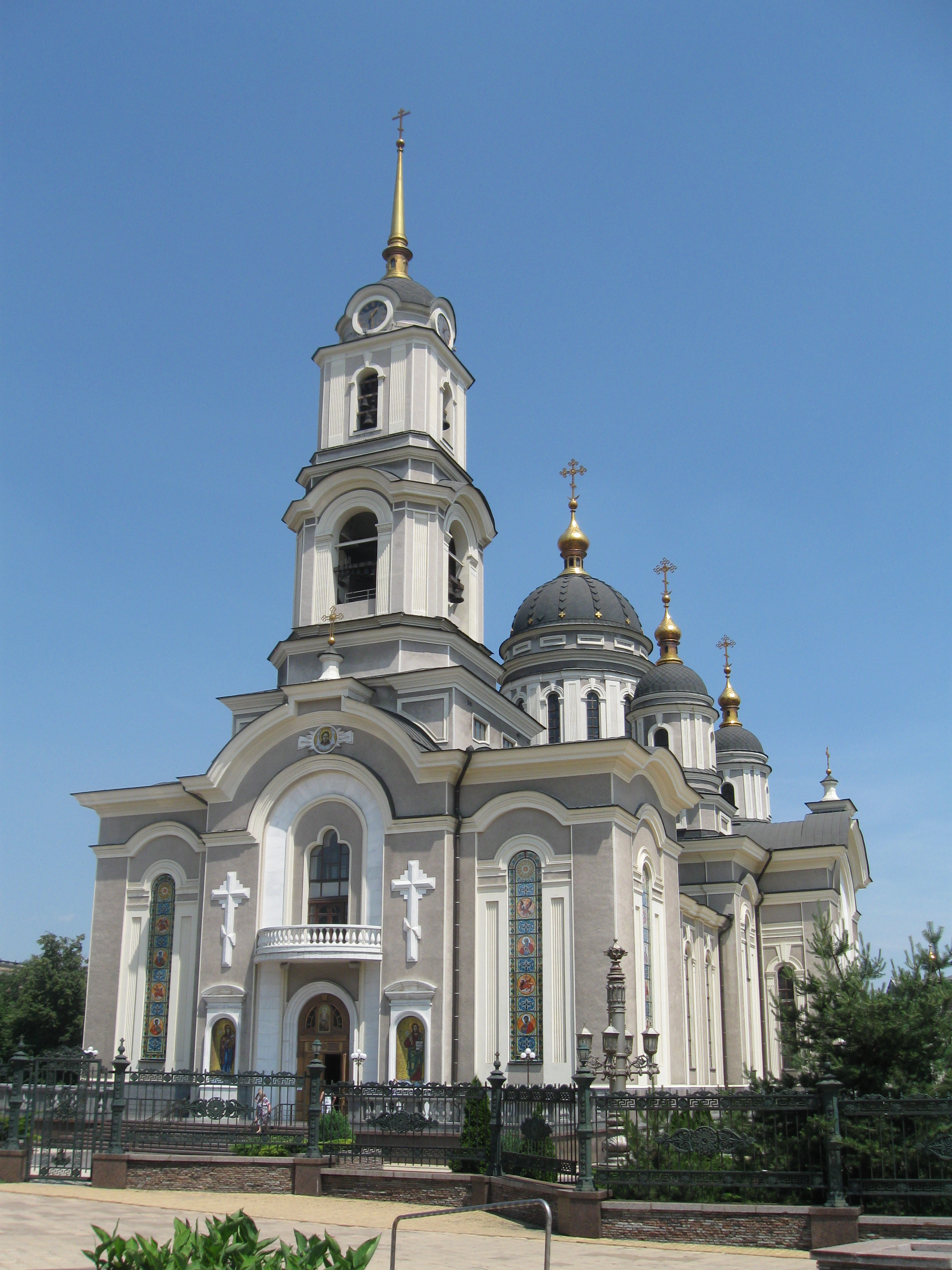
- The cathedral in 2011
- Transfiguration Cathedral
- 48°00′38″N 37°48′20″E
- Location: Donetsk
- Address: Artema Street
- Country: Ukraine
- Denomination: Eastern Orthodoxy
- Website: donetsk-sob.church.ua

History
- Status: Active
- Founded: 1883
- Dedication: Transfiguration of Jesus
- Consecrated: October 2004

Architecture
- Functional status: Metropolitan cathedral
- Architect: Konstantin Thon
- Architectural type: Neoclassical
- Completed: 2004

Administration
- Archdiocese: Ukrainian Orthodox Church

The Spaso-Preobrazhensky (Transfiguration) Cathedral (Ukrainian: Преображенський собор, romanized: Preobrazhensʹkyy sobor) or the Holy Transfiguration Cathedral, is a 20th-century Eastern Orthodoxy cathedral in Donetsk, Ukraine. Konstantin Thon designed the church and the cathedral has since become one of the city's historical landmarks.

== Design ==
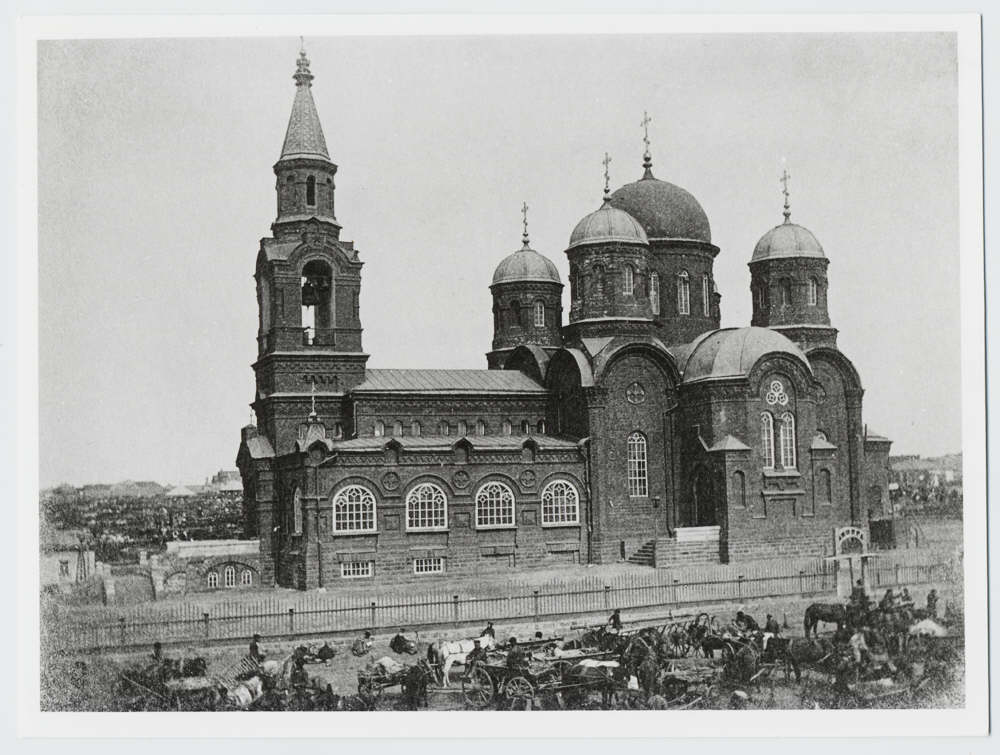
The cathedral in the 1890s

Originally, the cathedral was constructed in accordance with architect Konstantin Thon's conventional design, which had a single dome and a cubic shape and had been authorised by the Holy Synod back in 1830. A bell tower, four domes, two side chapels, two chambers for altars to the north and south of the main altar, and a refectory were added to the single-domed structure a few years later, owing to further donations. The bell tower rose to become Yuzivka's (present day Donetsk) highest structure.

The icons in carved kiots in the cathedral, which was subsequently adorned in a Byzantine style by icon painters under the direction of Gennady Zhukov. The bottom level of the structure has the temple as well as a baptistery, sacristy, prosphornia, refectory, library, and conference room.

There are three thrones in the top temple since it has three aisles. The most significant church services, attended by the greatest number of parishioners, are held at the main throne honouring the Transfiguration of Jesus. The cathedral houses the lower church, which is devoted to Sergius of Radonezh, in addition to the higher one.

The Transfiguration Cathedral's three-tiered bell tower, which has an observation deck and clock on the third tier, is crowned by an oval dome and spire that rises to a height of 73 metres (240 ft). The Donetsk Metallurgical Plant, managed by Sergei Samoilov, created the bells, which Metropolitan Vladimir of Kyiv and All Ukraine placed and dedicated in 2004. The domes, crosses, and their pedestals are covered in gold-plated copper, while the cathedral's entrance portals are mosaicked and constructed of premium wood and metal.

The installation of a massive stained glass mosaic window on the building's front, located to the right of the Holy Transfiguration Cathedral's main entrance, was finished in the spring of 2010. The window aperture is 1.63 metres (5 ft 4 in) wide and 9.3 meters high, at which point the 500 kilograms (1,100 lb) glass structure is installed. Viktor Evdokimov, a Donetsk artist, and his son Alexander spent three months working on the stained glass.

== History ==
At the close of the 1800s, Yuzivka saw the construction of its first cathedral, dedicated to the Transfiguration of Jesus. On the portion of land near the market that Prince Liven set aside for this purpose, the stone temple was constructed. With funding provided by Bakhmut merchant S. A. Lobas (about 3,500 rubles), construction began in 1883, and the cathedral building was completed in 1884. On 2 November 1886, was the temple's consecration day. It has developed into one of Yuzivka's most intriguing and important buildings, a remarkable architectural achievement for the entire South of Russia as well as the Donbas.

Prince Lieven, the landlord, gave up 66 acres (27 ha) of land, five thousand rubles, iconostasis, and building materials worth two thousand rubles. The Novorossiysk Society of Coal, Iron, Steel, and Rail Production also donated five thousand rubles. Businessmen provided cutlery and cash totaling two thousand rubles. Three thousand more were gathered by Yuzivka locals, primarily merchants. For a period of six months, the Novorossiysk Society's workers saved a penny from every ruble earned. The church was able to earn 17,000 rubles.

John Evgrafov, the previous churchwarden, offered two houses: one for the deacon and one for the priest. Every room had a heating burner throughout the winter. In honour of the Mother of God of Kazan, the left side was dedicated. The clergy of the church, which included three priests, a deacon, and three psalmists, was recognised by the Holy Synod in 1894. From 1883, A.G. Matveevsky served as the priest of the Transfiguration Church. An official record of the most significant local events was preserved at the church.

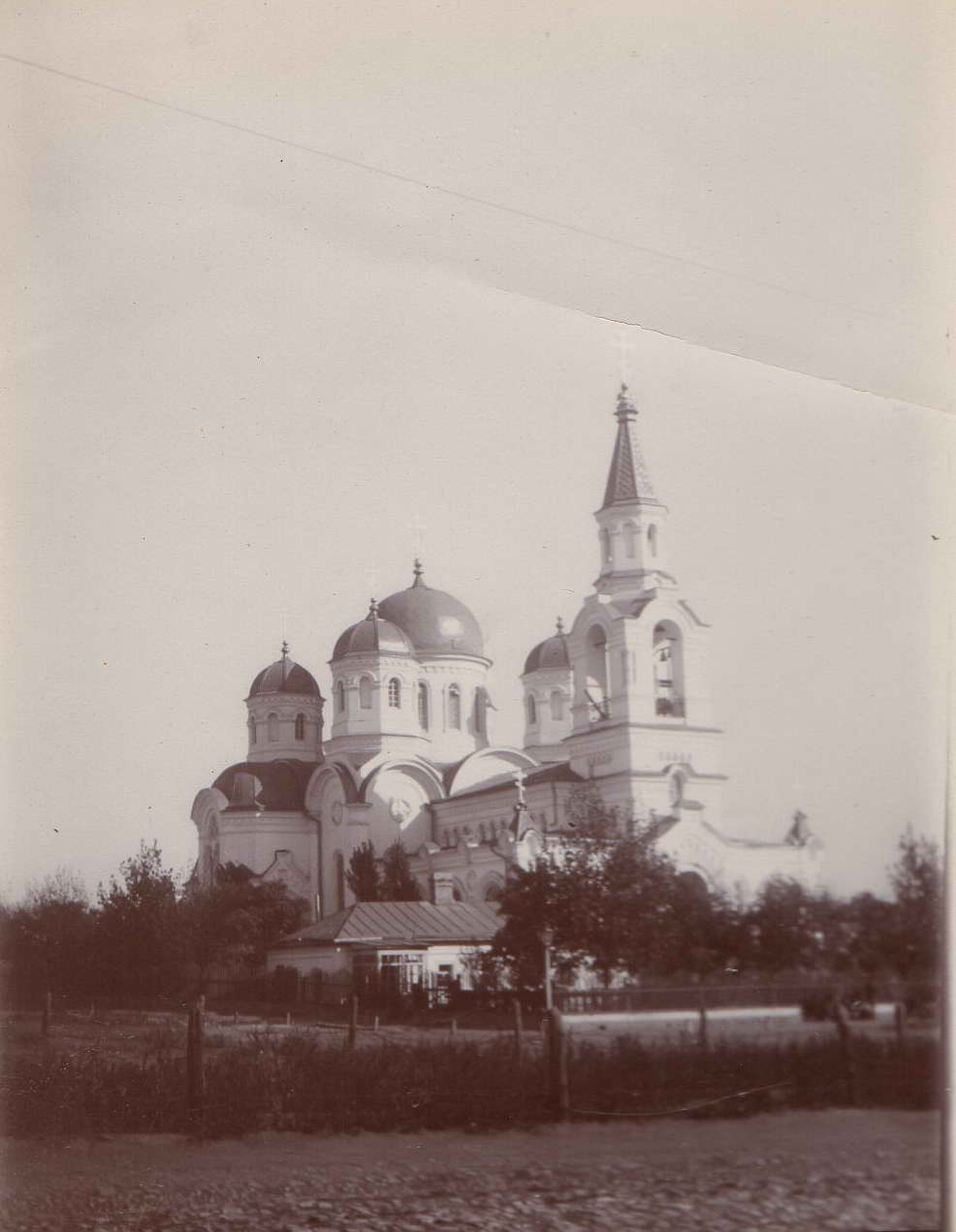
The cathedral seen in 1906

From 2,500 parishioners in 1892 to 12,000 in 1913, the Holy Transfiguration Church has seen a steady growth in its membership. A few years later, in 1893, four domes were added to the main altar, along with a refectory, a bell tower, two aisles, and two chambers for altars to the north and south of it. Matveevsky organised a conference at the Transfiguration Cathedral on 2 September 1893, to discuss the formation of an Orthodox fraternity. It was revealed during this conference that the Ekaterinoslav diocese had granted authorisation to establish an Orthodox fraternity. The Yuzivka Brotherhood School was established in 1896 by the church brotherhood.

The cathedral was blocked off from the main city street in Stalino in 1928 when the Komsomolets Cinema was constructed at a breakneck rate. The Transfiguration Cathedral was damaged on 11 December 1930, and the bell tower was later destroyed. Additionally, the church was destroyed by explosion in 1931 for building materials. A demolishment order on 18 October 1931, which was signed by the deputy chairman of the Central Committee of the Communist Party of the Soviet Union, producing up to 80% of usable building material. The destruction of the church became one of the hundreds of incidents in the Soviet anti-religious legislation.

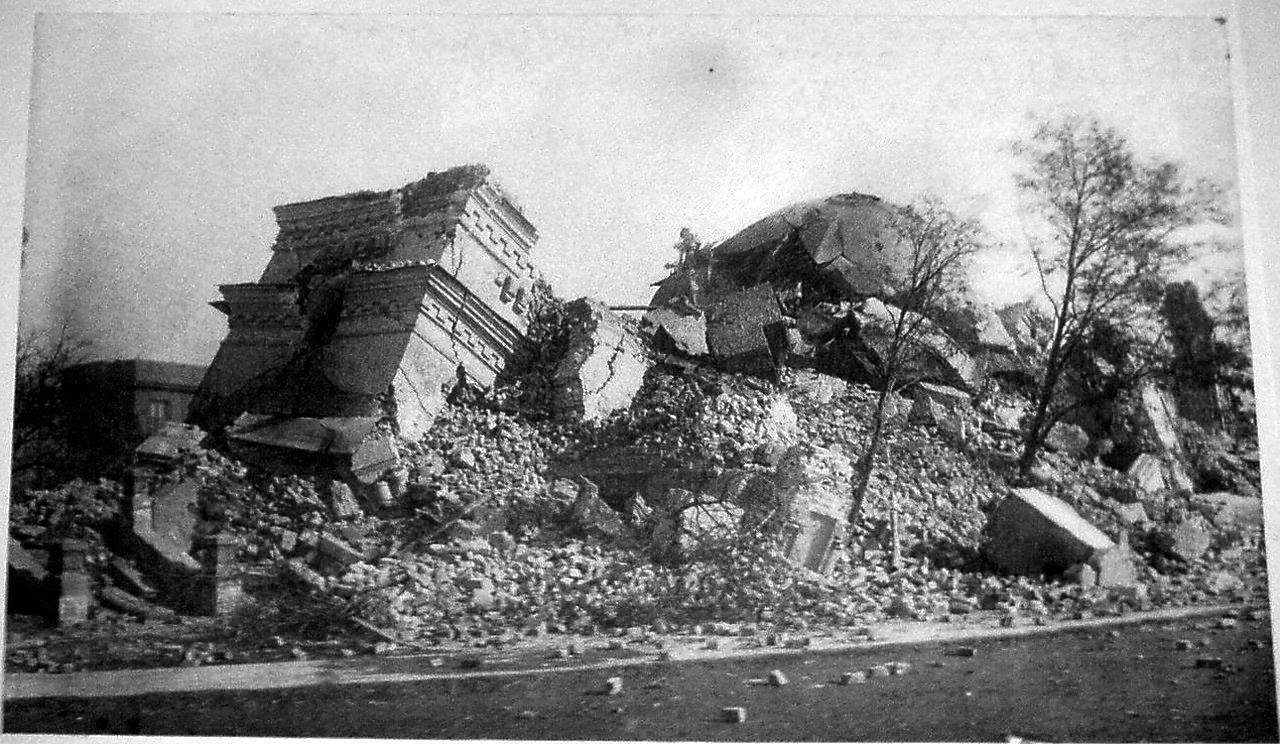
The ruins of the cathedral in 1933

The Donetsk Town Planning Council allocated a platform for the cathedral's construction on 9 August 1991, in Gorky Square. Bishop Hippolyte of Donetsk and Slavonic dedicated the first stone placed in the Transfiguration Cathedral's foundation on 27 February 1993. The Donetsk department was led by His Eminence Metropolitan Hilarion of Donetsk and Mariupol, in September 1996. His life's work became building the cathedral, with everyone from Governor Viktor Yanukovych and the administration of the Donbas companies to common labourers appearing to have contributed to its development.

The church of the Transfiguration Cathedral, devoted to Sergius of Radonezh, was consecrated in October 2004 by Metropolitan Hilarion of Donetsk and Mariupol. Donetsk received a bronze monument of Archangel Michael in 2002 from the people of Kyiv; the statue had previously been located in Independence Square in Kyiv. It was in the church's conference room that Metropolitan Vladimir of Kyiv and All Ukraine hosted a meeting of the Inter-Council Presence of the Russian Orthodox Church in September 2010.

== Gallery ==
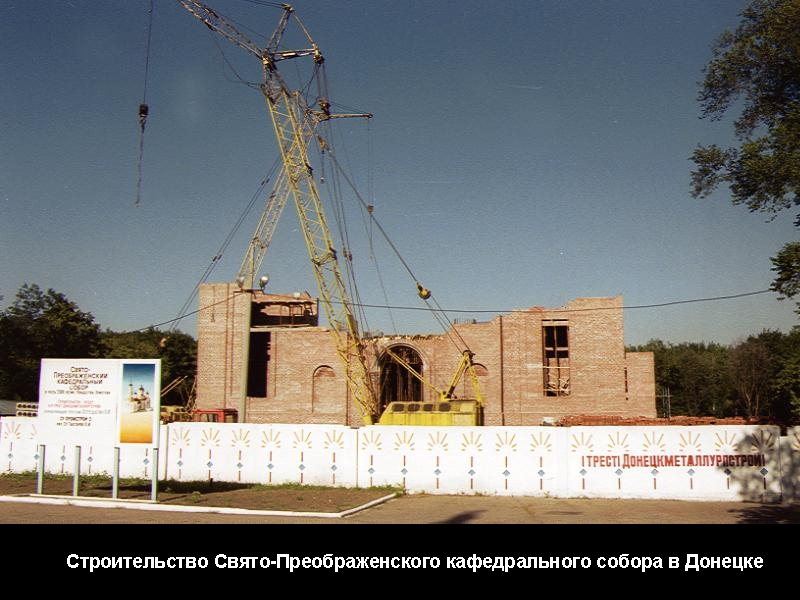
The cathedral under construction in c. 2001

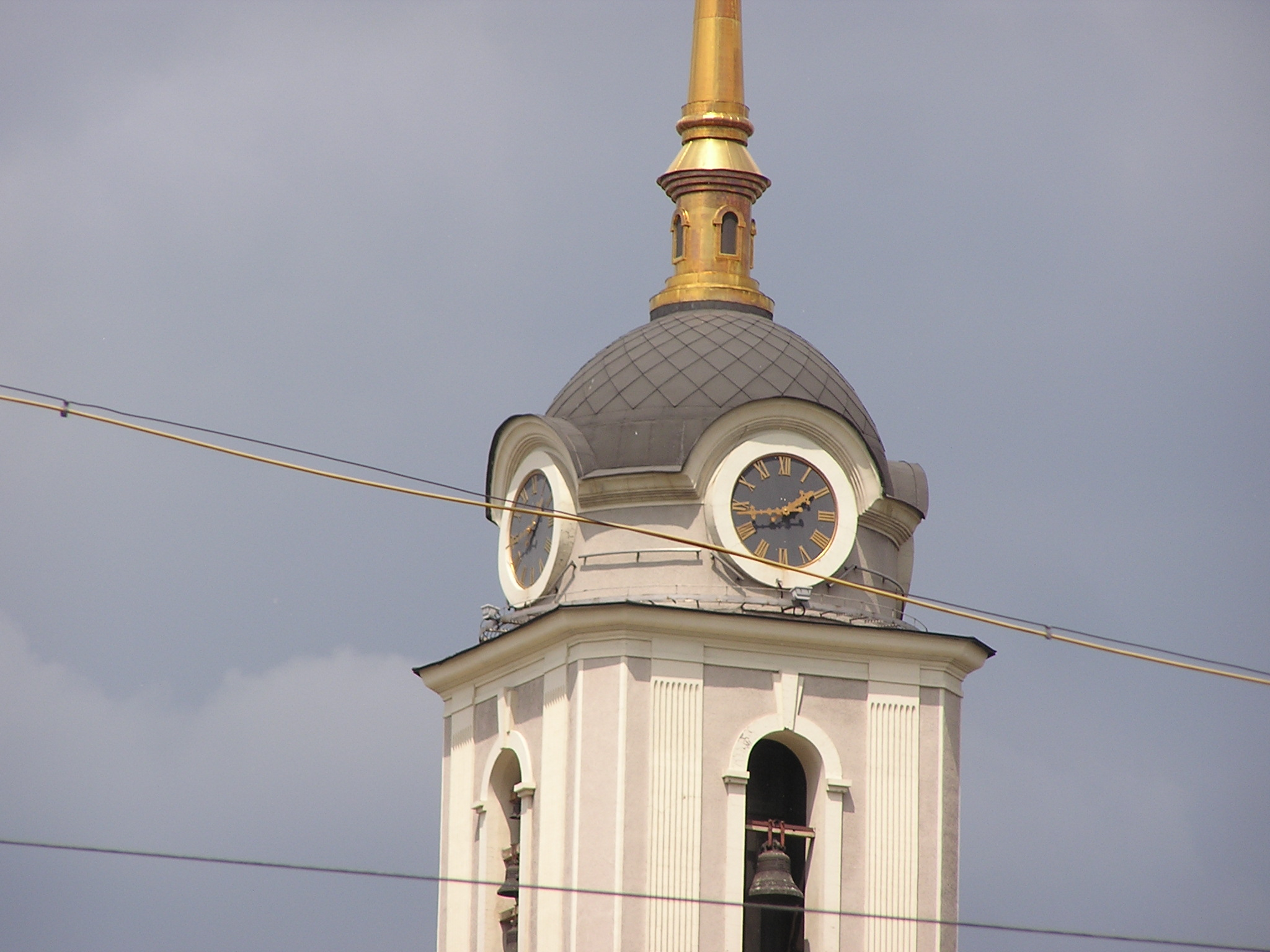
The bell and clock tower in 2008

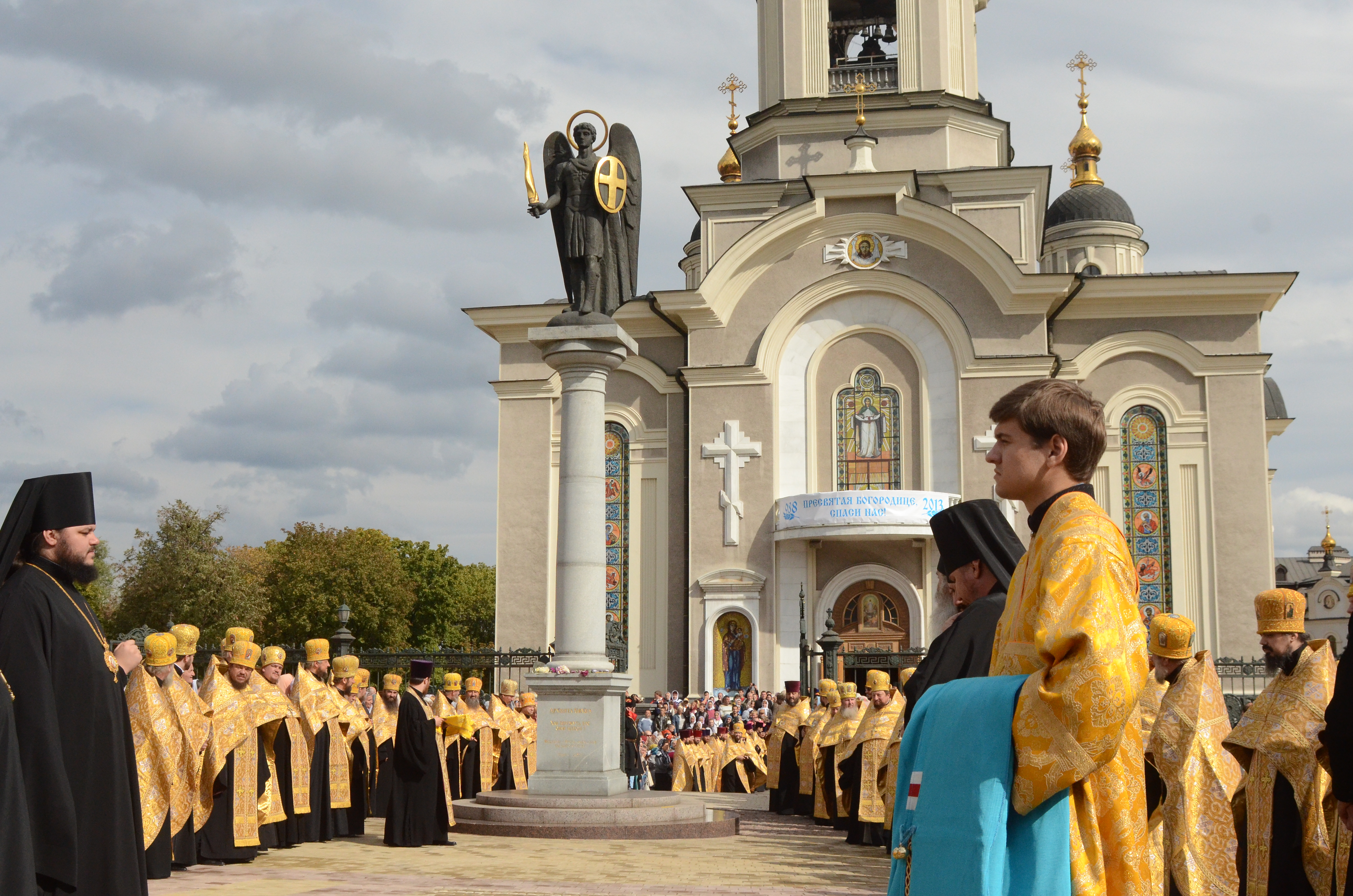
Statue of Saint Michael in 2013

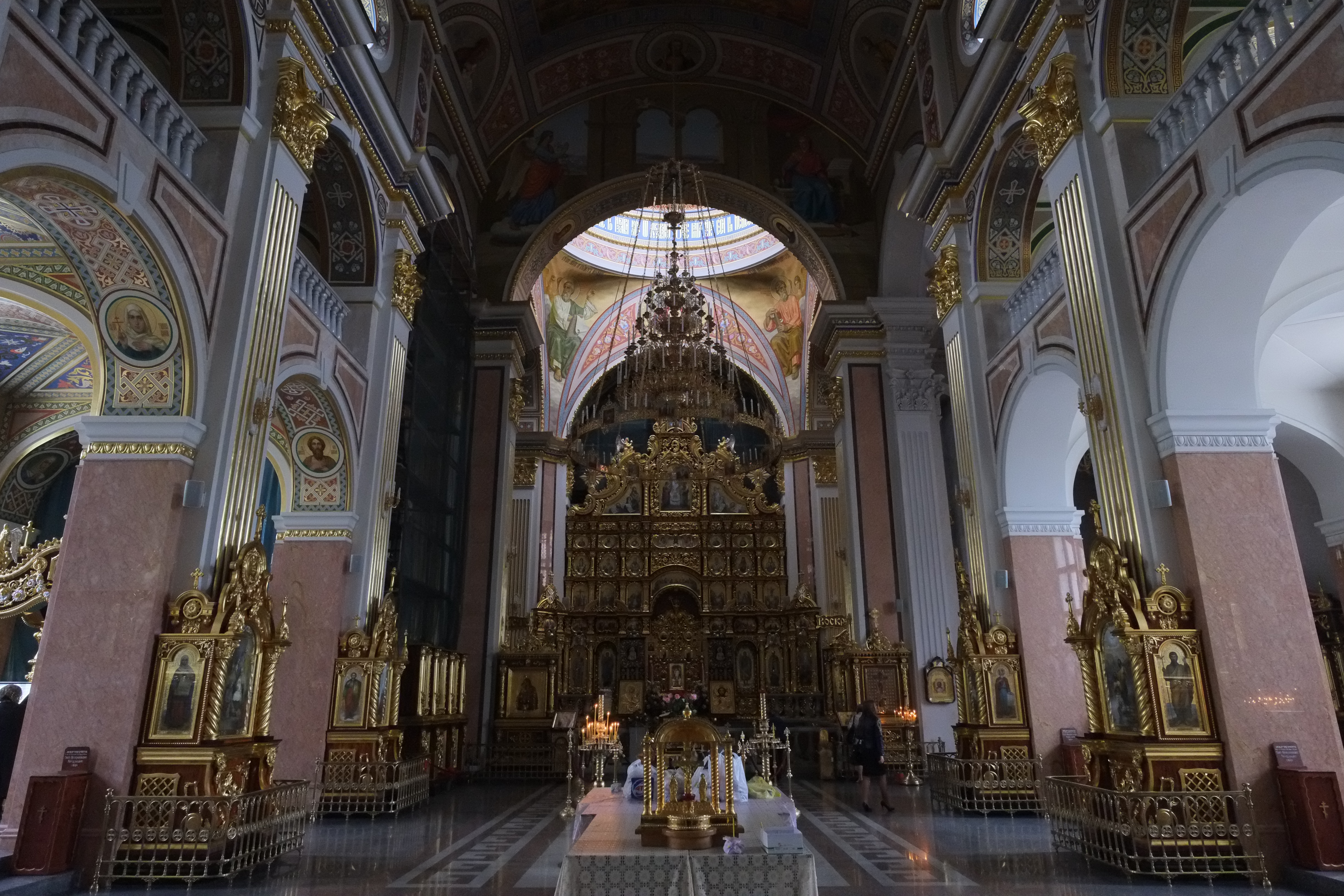
The interior in 2014

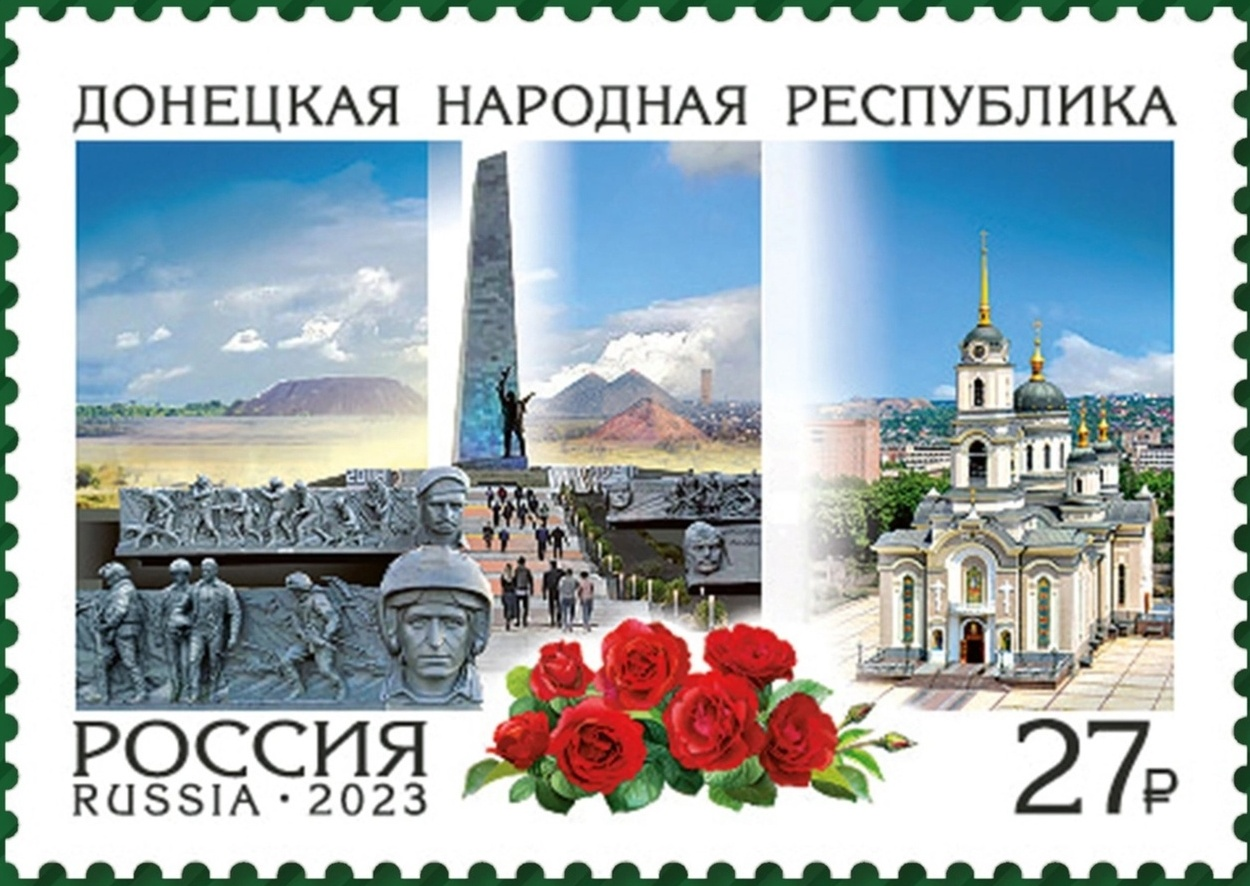
A 2023 postage stamp with the cathedral
