= 296th Rifle Division =

- Active: 1st formation: July 1941 – August 1942; 2nd formation: July 1943 – 1946
- Country: Soviet Union
- Branch: Red Army
- Type: Rifle division
- Engagements: World War II

Commanders
- Notable commanders: Alexander Ryzhov

The 296th Rifle Division (Russian: 296-я стрелковая дивизия) was an infantry division of the Soviet Union's Red Army during World War II, formed twice. Its first formation was formed in the summer of 1941 and destroyed during Case Blue, the German summer offensive in the North Caucasus, in 1942. Reformed in the summer of 1943 in Georgia, the division's second formation never saw combat and was disbanded by 1946.

== History ==
=== First Formation ===
The division began forming on 2 July 1941 in the Odessa Military District. Its basic order of battle included the 962nd, 964th, and the 966th Rifle Regiments, as well as the 813th Artillery Regiment. By 20 August, the division had been assigned to the Southern Front's 9th Army. In October, the 296th was transferred to the 18th Army, and in February 1942 it was moved into the front reserve. The division was sent to the front with the 37th Army a month later. With the 37th Army, the 296th escaped the disaster in the Second Battle of Kharkov. The division was soon transferred back to the 9th Army, with which it retreated into the Caucasus after the start of the German summer offensive, Case Blue, in June. The 296th suffered heavy losses during the retreat, and on 5 August was disbanded. Its remnants were used to reinforce the 242nd Rifle Division.

=== Second Formation ===
The division was reformed on 16 July 1943 from training units in Georgia, part of the Transcaucasian Military District, and never saw combat. The division spent the rest of the war as part of the 12th Rifle Corps or the 13th Rifle Corps, under which it guarded the Turkish and Iranian borders. In May 1945, the 296th was part of the 12th Rifle Corps. In September, when the corps became part of the Tbilisi Military District, the 296th was stationed at Poti. The division was disbanded there by 1946.
