= Monument to Alexander II (Shakhty) =

Coordinates: 47.4235°N 40.1230°E

- Памятник Александру II
- Interactive map of Monument to Alexander II
- Location: Shakhty, Rostov Oblast, Russia
- Designer: Yuri Levochkin
- Opening date: 2015
- Dedicated to: Alexander II of Russia

Monument to Alexander II of Russia (Russian: Памятник Александру II) — is a monument in Shakhty, Rostov Oblast, Russia.

== History ==
The monument to Emperor Alexander II was opened on April 29, 2015. It was placed in front of the main building of the Institute of Service and Entrepreneurship of Don State Technological Institute (DSTU) in the city of Shakhty. The monument was built on voluntary donations. The right to hold its opening was given to a representative of the house of Romanov, the great-grandson of Emperor Alexander III, Pavel Eduardovich Kulikovsky-Romanov.

== Description ==
The pedestal is made of dark granite, and the statue of Alexander II — of bronze. The height of the monument is 5.7 meters, and the figure of Alexander II is 2.4 meters.

On the front side there is the inscription in gold letters that reads "Alexander II. Tsar the Liberator. " From the back, there is a brief biographical note on the ruler: "Emperor Alexander II abolished serfdom in Russia in 1861 and freed millions of peasants from centuries of slavery, conducted military and judicial reforms, introduced the system of local self-government, city dumas and local administrations, brought to the end the long-lasting Caucasian War, and liberated the Slavic peoples from the Ottoman yoke. He was killed on March 1, 1881, and was a victim of a terrorist.

The monument was erected on the initiative of the Historic council of the city of Shakhty. The sculptor is Yuri Alekseevich Levochkin.
