= Shakhty =

City in Rostov Oblast, Russia

Shakhty Шахты
- City
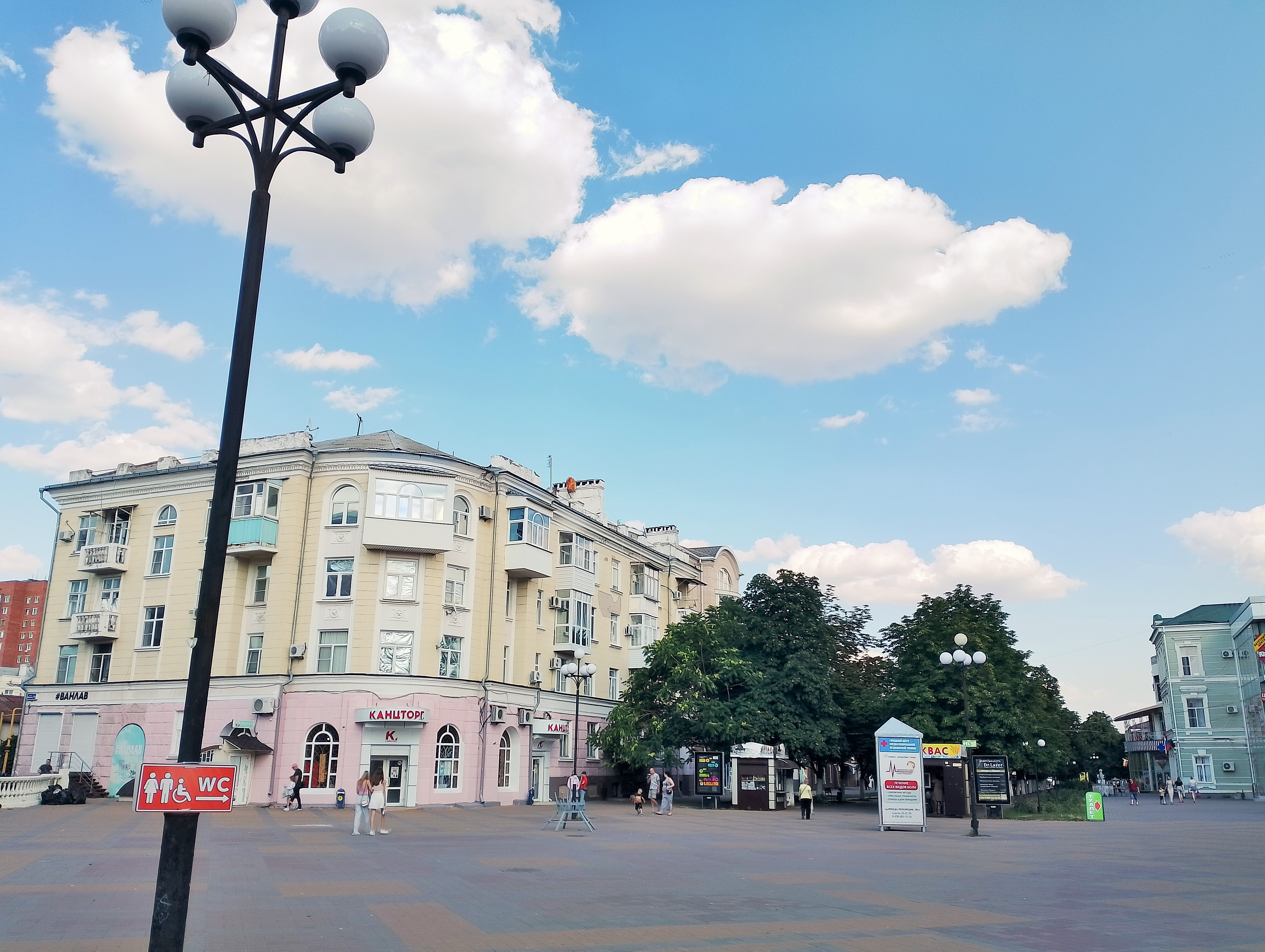
- Shevchenko Street

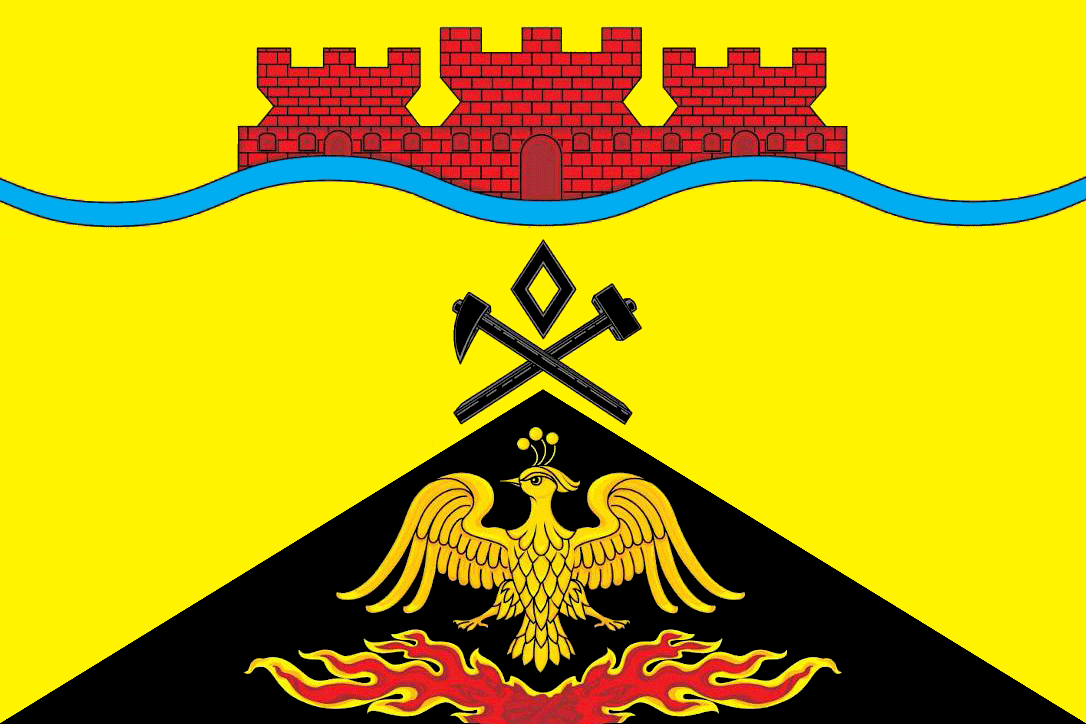
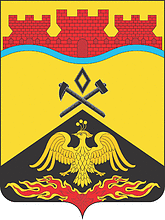
- Flag Coat of arms
- Interactive map of Shakhty
- Location of Shakhty Shakhty (European Russia) Shakhty (Europe)
- Coordinates: 47°42′N 40°14′E
- Country: Russia
- Federal subject: Rostov Oblast
- Founded: beginning of the 19th century

Government
  - Mayor: Denis Stanislavov
- Elevation: 100 m (330 ft)

Population (2010 Census)
  - Total: 263,377
  - Estimate (2025): 219,111 (−16.8%)
  - Rank: 79th in 2010

Administrative status
  - Subordinated to: Shakhty Urban Okrug
  - Capital of: Shakhty Urban Okrug

Municipal status
  - Urban okrug: Shakhty Urban Okrug
  - Capital of: Shakhty Urban Okrug
- Time zone: UTC+3 (MSK)
- Postal code: 346500
- Dialing code: +7 8636
- OKTMO ID: 60740000001
- City Day: Third Sunday of September
- Website: www.shakhty-gorod.ru

Shakhty (Russian: Шахты, IPA: [ˈʂaxtɨ], Ukrainian: Шахти) is a city in Rostov Oblast, Russia, located on the southeastern spur of the Donetsk mountain ridge, 75 kilometers (47 mi) northeast of Rostov-on-Don. As of the 2023 Census, its population was 222,500.

It was previously known as Alexandro-Grushevskaya (until 1867), Gornoye Grushevskoye Poseleniye (until 1881), Alexandrovsk-Grushevsky (until 1920). It was renamed to its current name when it was part of the Ukrainian Soviet Socialist Republic.

== History ==
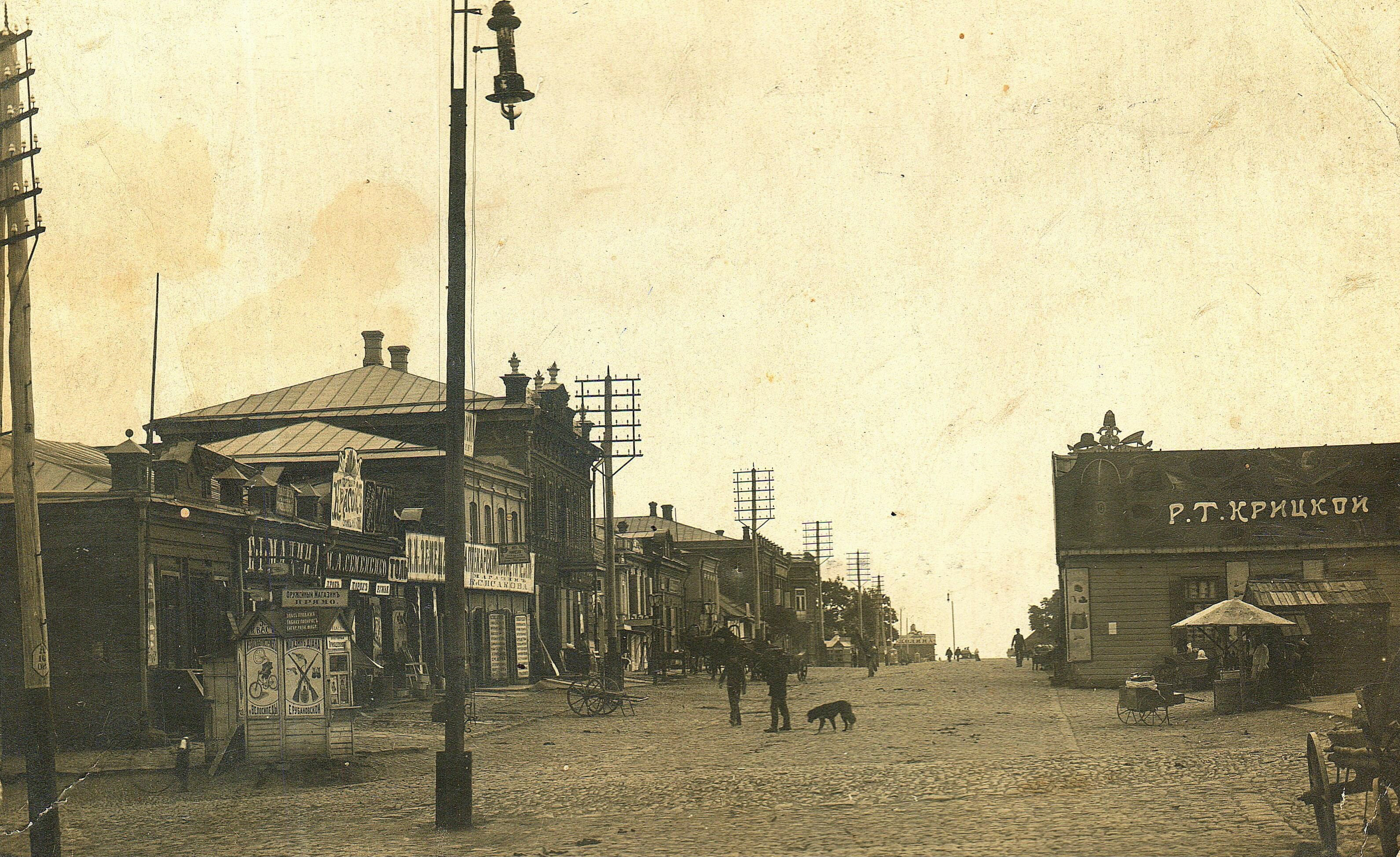
Early-20th-century view

In the beginning of the 19th century sergeant-major Popov founded on the Grushevka River a Cossack stanitsa of Alexandro-Grushevskaya (Александро-Грушевская). While the exact reasoning behind this name is unclear, it is possible that the name was given in honor of Emperor Alexander I. Twelve Cossacks and fourteen peasant serfs lived in the stanitsa at that time. By the mid-19th century, fifty-seven coal mines operated in this area. In 1867, it was granted town status and renamed Gornoye Grushevskoye Poseleniye (Горное Грушевское Поселение). The name was changed to Alexandrovsk-Grushevsky (Александровск-Грушевский) in 1881.

By 1914, the population had reached 54,000. The main source of income was coal mining, which had been carried out in that region since the end of the 18th century. The population was poor, but the town had rail, telegraph and telephone networks, electricity and plumbing as well as libraries, hospitals and a post office. 1917 saw the city change hands three times, until it was taken on April 28, 1919, by the Don Army, under General Aleksandr Fitskhelaurov. For twenty months it was independent of the Bolsheviks, but was ravaged by typhoid.

In 1920, the city was given its present name. The name, which literally means mines in Russian, was chosen due to the strong association with coal mining. In 1920–24 Shakhty was part of Donetsk Governorate of the Ukrainian SSR. During the 1920s, many of the churches and the archives were destroyed. In 1928, the city was the location of the Shakhty Trial, a precursor of the show trials of the 1930s.

In 1941, an independent Cossack republic had been declared in Shakhty although this was suppressed by the NKVD before the German invasion. On July 22, 1942, during the Second World War, the city was occupied by Nazi Germany; many coal pits and buildings were blown up by the Germans during their retreat on February 12, 1943. The Germans operated the Stalag 386 prisoner-of-war camp in the city. POWs worked as forced labourers in local coal mines and built antitank ditches. The Sicherheitsdienst carried out executions of Jews and political commissars. Twenty-nine of the townsmen were awarded the title of the Hero of the Soviet Union.

In 1948, production levels in the mines reached what they had been before the war. During the Leonid Brezhnev years, the city was at the height of its development, with a population of over 250,000, and about ten million tons of coal being mined each year.

In the 1970s and 1980s, the city was the scene of many of Andrei Chikatilo's murders.

Perestroika proved devastating for the city, as mines were privatized and shut down, causing massive unemployment, which led to a severe rise in crime and drug abuse. Today's Shakhty is the main industrial center of the Eastern Donbas. The city is also one of the main producers and exporters of tile in Eastern Europe.

== Administrative and municipal status ==
Within the framework of administrative divisions, it is incorporated as Shakhty Urban Okrug—an administrative unit with the status equal to that of the districts. As a municipal division, this administrative unit also has urban okrug status.

== Demographics ==
Historical population

Year	Pop.	±%
1897	16,000	—
1926	49,000	+206.2%
1939	135,000	+175.5%
1959	196,190	+45.3%
1970	205,307	+4.6%

Year	Pop.	±%
1979	209,495	+2.0%
1989	225,797	+7.8%
2002	222,592	−1.4%
2010	239,987	+7.8%
2021	226,452	−5.6%

Source: Census data

== Attractions ==
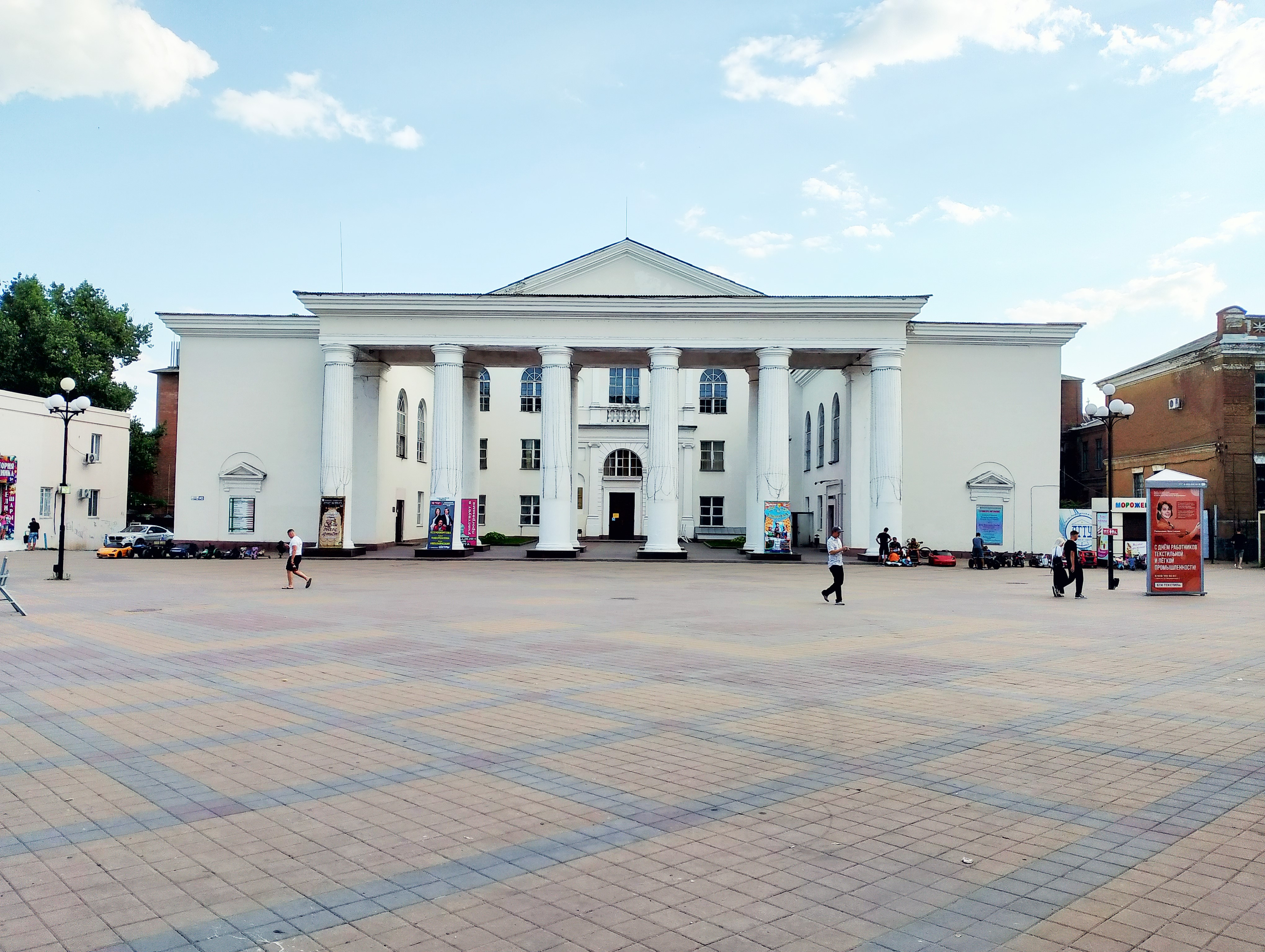
Drama theatre

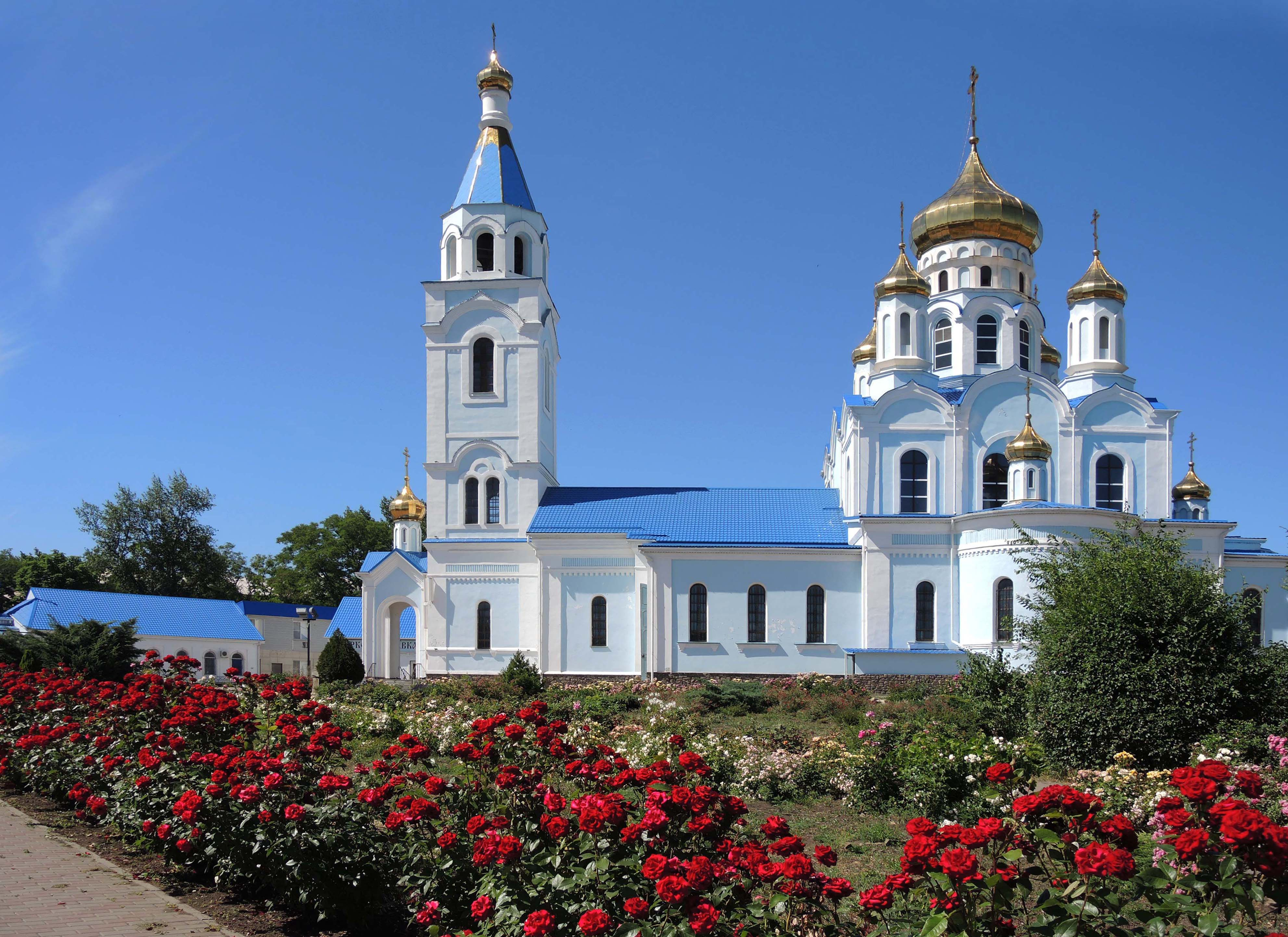
Cathedral of the Intercession

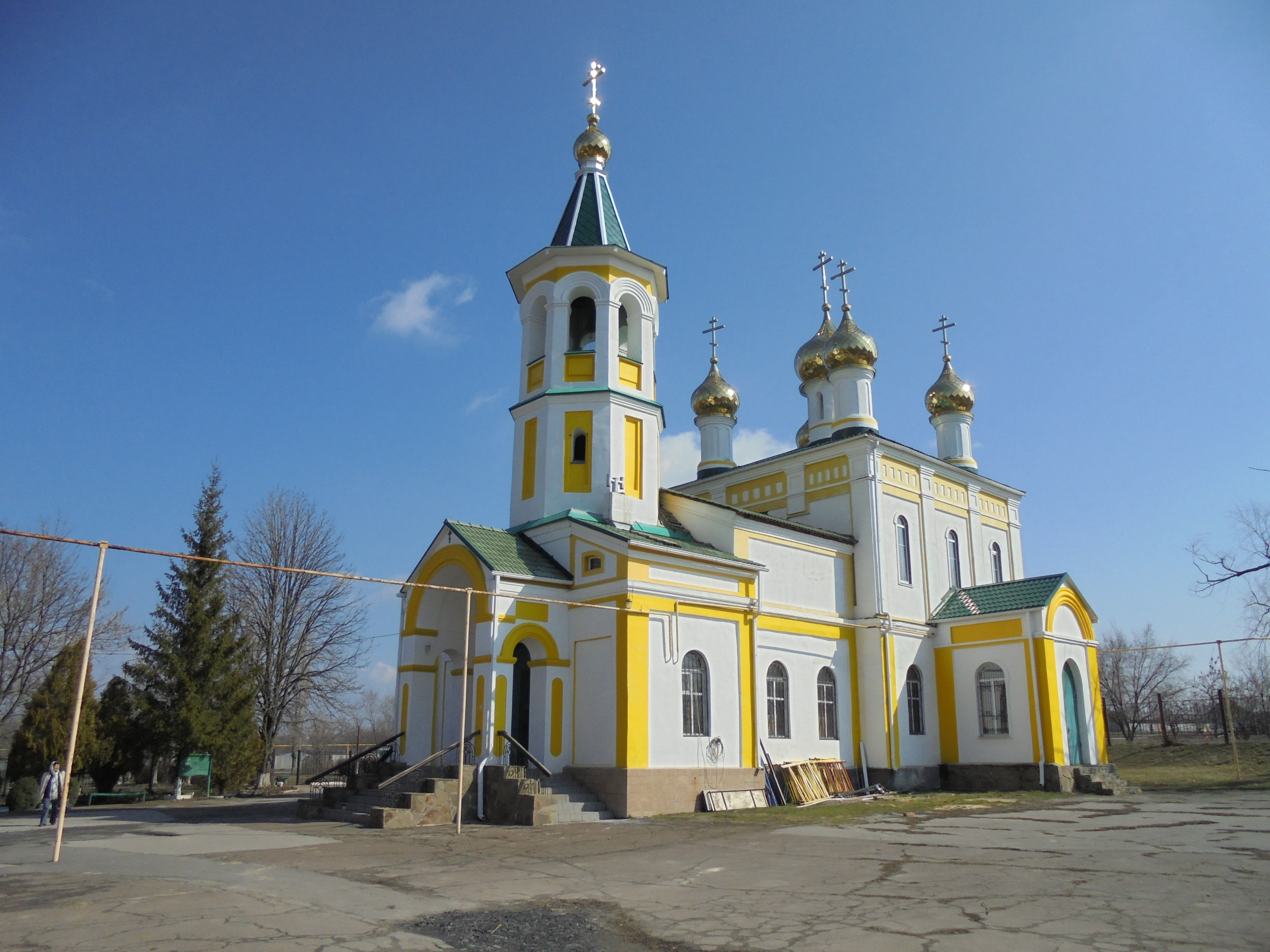
Saint Nicholas church

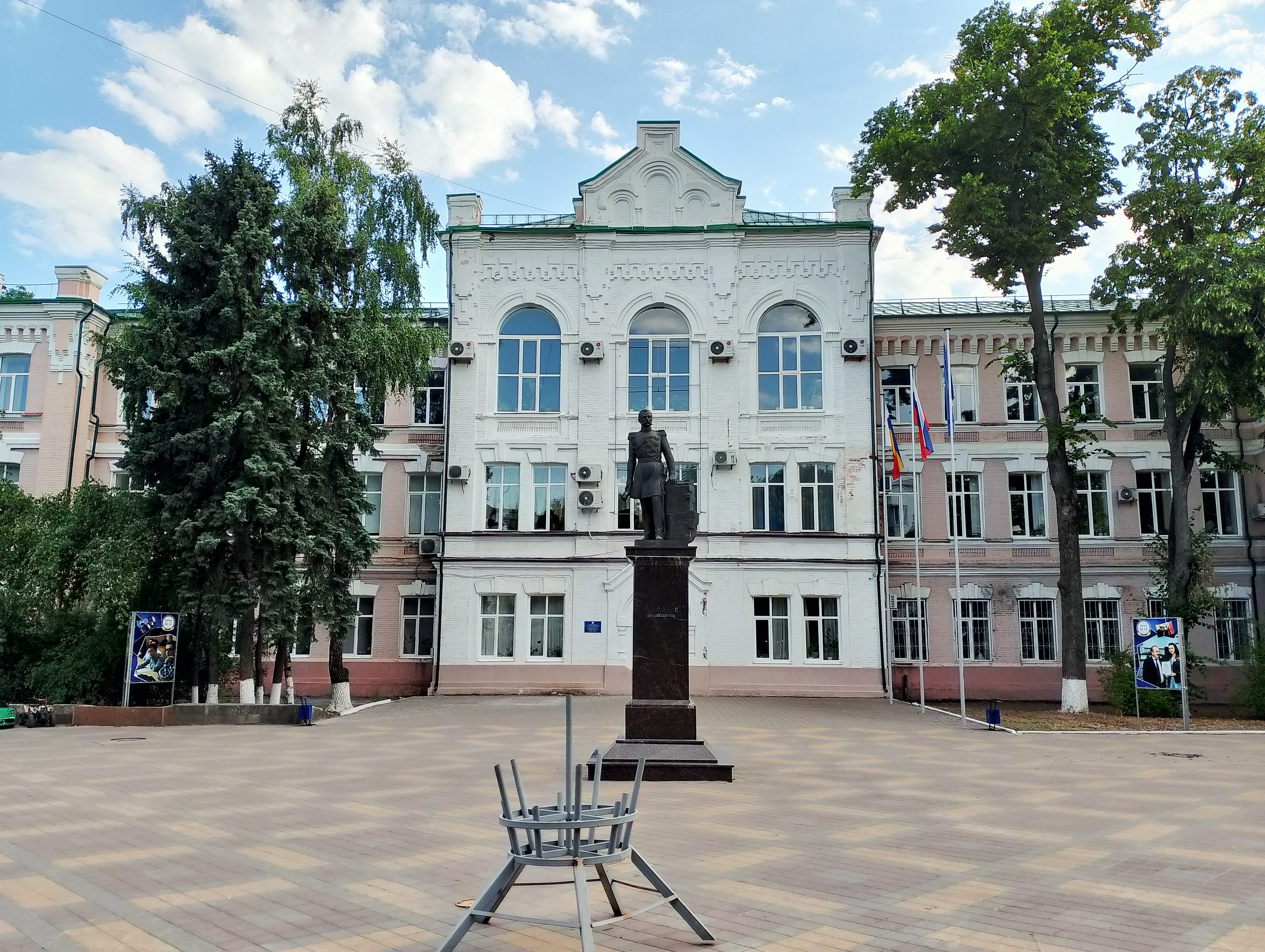
Institute of Service and Entrepreneurship

There are several monuments and historical sites in Shakhty.

- The Monument to Alexander II was opened on April 29, 2015, located in front of the main building of the Institute of Service and Entrepreneurship of Don State Technological Institute (DSTU) in the city centre of Shakhty. The monument was funded and built on donations. A representative of the house of Romanov, Pavel Eduardovich Kulikovsky-Romanov (great-grandson of Emperor Alexander III), was given the honor of unveiling the monument.

The monument was built by Yuri Alekseevich Levochkin. Its pedestal is made of dark granite, and the statue itself is cast from bronze. The lower half stand 5.7 meters high, and the figure of Alexander II is another 2.4 meters. On the front side, there is an engraving in gold letters that reads, "Alexander II. Tsar the Liberator". Viewed from the back, there is a brief biographical note on the ruler—"Emperor Alexander II abolished serfdom in Russia in 1861 and freed millions of peasants from centuries of slavery, conducted military and judicial reforms, introduced the system of local self-government, city dumas and local administrations, brought to an end the long-lasting Caucasian War, and liberated the Slavic peoples from the Ottoman yoke. He was killed on March 1, 1881 and was a victim of a terrorist." The monument was erected on an initiative of the Historical Council of the City of Shakhty.

- Monument to Vasily Alexeyev (2014), a Soviet weightlifter. He set 80 world records and 81 Soviet records in weightlifting, and won gold medals at the 1972 and 1976 Summer Olympics. Alexeyev was born in Shakhty.
- Monument to Soldier-liberator (1985)
- Memorial to the Victims of Fascism (1975)
- Monument to the fighters for Soviet power (1955)
- Monument to soldiers-internazionalista (2010)
- Monument to Taras Shevchenko (1972)
- Monuments to Lenin (1945). Vladimir Ilyich Ulyanov was a Russian communist revolutionary, politician and political theorist.
- A memorial to the heroes of the first world war (2014). On the monument depicts a double-headed eagle. In his paws cadet standard, with the monogram of the Russian Emperor Nicholas II. On the plates under the wings of the eagle is engraved the names of all of the Don Cossack units that participated in the First World War.
- Saint Alexander Nevsky Church

== Twin towns – sister cities ==
Shakhty is twinned with:

- Armavir, Armenia
- Gelsenkirchen, Germany
- Nikopol, Bulgaria
- Sievierodonetsk, Ukraine

== Notable people ==
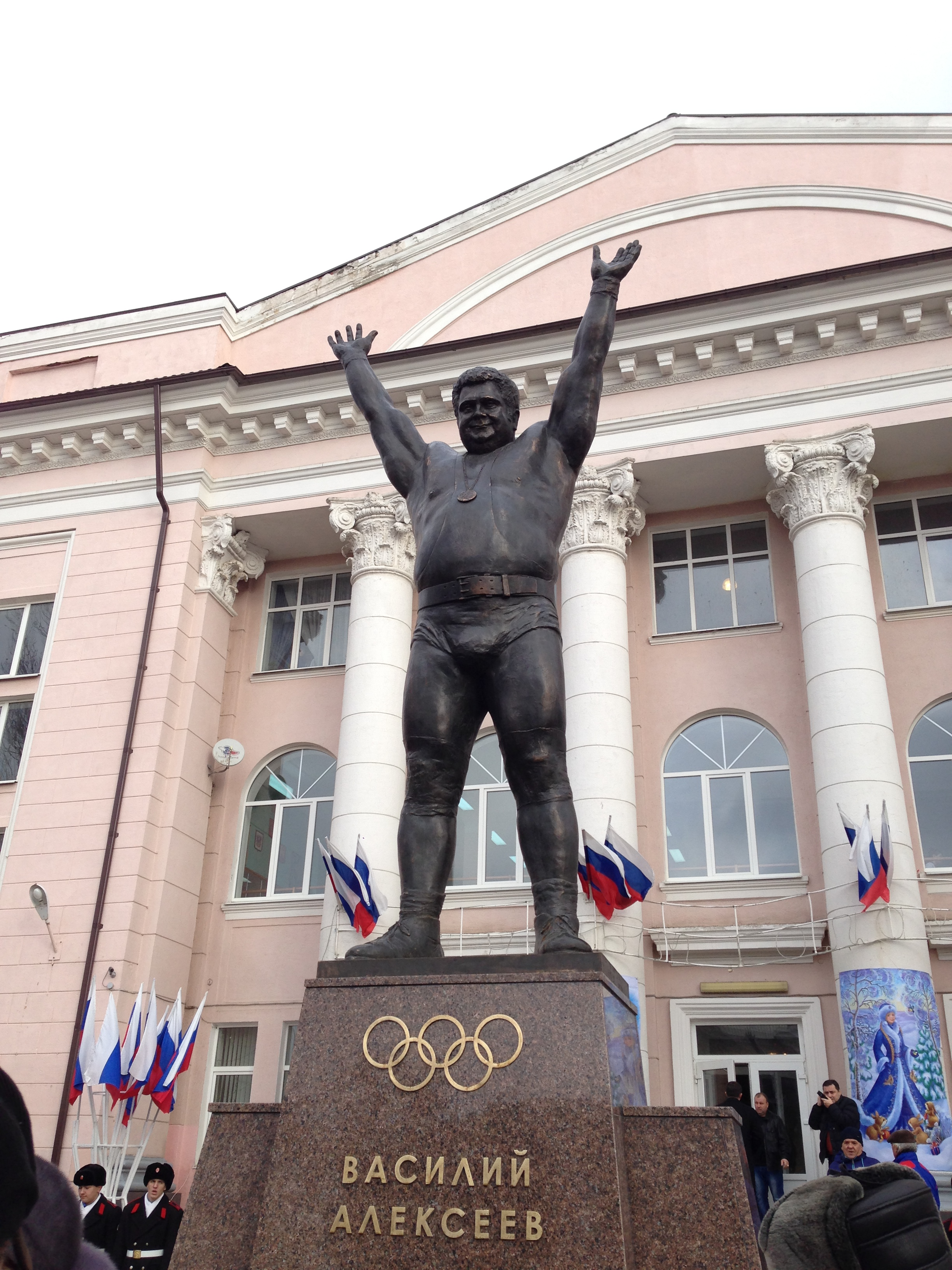
Monument to Vasily Alexeyev

- Vasily Alexeyev (1942–2011), weightlifter
- Lyudmila Kondratyeva (born 1958), sprinter
- Alina Ermolova (born 2001), rhythmic gymnast
- Marina Logvinenko (born 1961), sport shooter
- Alexander Nevolin-Svetov (born 1988), Paralympic swimmer
