= 230th Rifle Division =

230th Rifle Division (July 10, 1941 - August 23, 1942) 230th Rifle Division (June 29, 1943 - October 1945)
- Active: 1941–1945
- Country: Soviet Union
- Branch: Red Army
- Type: Infantry
- Size: Division
- Engagements: Battle of Kiev (1941); Battle of Rostov (1941); Case Blue; Battle of the Caucasus; Izyum–Barvenkovo offensive Donbas strategic offensive (August 1943); Battle of the Dniepr; Nikopol–Krivoi Rog offensive Uman–Botoșani offensive First Jassy–Kishinev Offensive; Second Jassy–Kishinev Offensive; Vistula–Oder offensive East Pomeranian offensive Battle of Berlin
- Decorations: Order of Suvorov (2nd Formation)
- Battle honours: Stalino (2nd Formation)

Commanders
- Notable commanders: Col. Gavriil Antonovich Kutalev; Maj. Gen. Fyodor Vasilevich Zakharov; Col. Andrei Antonovich Ukrainskii; Col. Yosif Anatolevich Kazakov; Col. Daniil Kuzmich Shishkov

The 230th Rifle Division was an infantry division of the Red Army, originally formed as one of the first reserve rifle divisions following the German invasion of the USSR. After being hastily organized, it joined the fighting front along the lower Dniepr River as part of 6th Army. After the German victory east of Kyiv, it retreated into the Donbas as part of 12th Army and spent the winter in the fighting around Rostov-on-Don. When the German 1942 summer offensive began, it was driven back, now as part of 37th Army, and largely encircled near Millerovo. While not destroyed, by late August it was so depleted that it was disbanded.

A new 230th was formed in late June 1943 based on a Siberian rifle brigade. After an inauspicious debut, the division was briefly removed from the fighting front for additional training. After returning, it soon earned a battle honor in the battles in the Donbas before advancing to the Dniepr River. Through this time it was part of 5th Shock Army and through most of the remainder of the war it would be under this command. In February 1944 it and its 9th Rifle Corps entered 3rd Ukrainian Front and remained there through the advance into western Ukraine and the fighting along the Dniester River and into Moldova. In early September, 5th Shock was removed to the Reserve of the Supreme High Command and redeployed to 1st Belorussian Front in eastern Poland in preparation for the advance on the German capital. During the offensive all three of the division's rifle regiments were recognized for their roles in the fighting for East Pomerania, and the 230th as a whole was later decorated for its part in the battle of Berlin, while several of its subunits also received distinctions. In October 1945 the division began converting to a mechanized infantry division and served in this role near Moscow until it was disbanded in 1947.

== 1st Formation ==
A division numbered as the 230th began forming in March 1941 in the Odessa Military District but in April it was moved to the Kharkov Military District and disbanded to provide a cadre for the 4th Airborne Brigade.

Another division numbered as the 230th officially formed on July 10 at Dnepropetrovsk in the Odessa Military District. Its personnel were drawn from militia and reservists from throughout the District, which were very short of heavy weapons and equipment of all kinds, and had only about six weeks for organizing and training. Once formed, its official order of battle, based on an abbreviated version of the shtat (table of organization and equipment) of September 13, 1939, was as follows, although it would be modified, temporarily or permanently, on several occasions:

- 986th Rifle Regiment
- 988th Rifle Regiment
- 990th Rifle Regiment
- 805th Artillery Regiment (until November 9, 1941)
- 370th Artillery Regiment (later 370th Howitzer Artillery Regiment)
- 330th Antitank Battalion
- 436th Antiaircraft Battery (later 537th Antiaircraft Battalion)
- 349th Reconnaissance Company
- 552nd Sapper Battalion (later 554th)
- 624th Signal Battalion
- 327th Medical/Sanitation Battalion
- 289th Chemical Defense (Anti-gas) Company
- 718th Motor Transport Company
- 374th Field Bakery (later 404th)
- 54th Divisional Veterinary Hospital (later 675th)
- 261st Field Postal Station (later 980th)
- 827th Field Office of the State Bank

Col. Gavriil Antonovich Kutalev was appointed to command on the day the division formed, but he would be replaced on August 2 by Col. Fyodor Vasilevich Zakharov. This officer would lead the 230th for the remainder of its 1st formation and would be promoted to the rank of major general on May 21, 1942. By the beginning of August the Odessa Military District had come under command of Southern Front, and as of August 5 it was considered part of the active army. On August 31 the 230th was assigned to the 6th Army, which was rebuilding after having been destroyed near Uman at the beginning of the month.

=== Battles in the Donbas ===
By this time the 1st Panzer Group had occupied the bend of the Dniepr River opposite and south of Dnepropetrovsk, although an attempt to take that city was foiled in part because Red Army engineers had blown the dam and the hydroelectric station on August 18. The panzer group later shifted northwest and crossed at Kremenchuk, soon driving north to encircle and destroy most of Southwestern Front east of Kyiv in the first weeks of September. This disaster did not directly affect 6th Army and later in the month the 230th was moved farther south to join 12th Army.

While the German offensive focus now turned to Moscow and Leningrad, Army Group South was ordered to advance on Kharkiv, the Donbas and Rostov-na-Donu. Attacking from the march south of Poltava the 1st Panzer Army quickly smashed the defenses of 12th Army then raced on to Melitopol, encircling six divisions of Southern Front's 9th and 18th Armies on October 7. The panzers then pursued along the coast of the Sea of Azov, reaching the Mius River on the 13th before halting to regroup. As of the start of November the retreating 12th Army had just five weakened rifle divisions under command. During the pause in operations the Army took up new defenses along the Mius along with the escaped elements of the 9th and 18th and the newly arrived 56th Army. On November 21 the 1st Panzer Army captured Rostov but the thrust to reach the city opened a gap between it and 17th Army to the west that was soon exploited by 37th Army. Shortly after the 9th and 56th Armies attacked the southern and eastern flanks of 1st Panzer and by November 29 had cleared the city.

=== Case Blue ===
In January 1942 the 230th was reassigned again, now to 37th Army, where it remained into the spring. This Army largely escaped the defeat of the northern armies of the Front in the Second Battle of Kharkov, but was left facing the southern prong of the German summer offensive on an overextended frontage. The 1st Panzer and 17th Armies launched their attack on July 7. 37th Army was positioned south of the Donets and north of Artemivsk with four divisions, including the 230th, in the first echelon and one in reserve, supported by just 46 tanks of the 121st Tank Brigade, and was soon falling back north of the river and eastward north of Luhansk in the face of the advance by 1st Panzer. By dawn on July 15 the 3rd Panzer Division of 4th Panzer Army had linked up with 14th Panzer of 1st Panzer Army 40km south of Millerovo. This appeared to seal the fate of up to five Soviet armies, including the 37th, but the encirclement was never really closed; the cordon was porous at best as the German infantry lagged behind. Some remnants of 37th Army managed to escape eastward over the following days although German sources identified the 230th as one of the Red Army divisions "destroyed" in the pocket. As of July 25 a report of the defensive dispositions of Southern Front stated remnants of the division were still under command of 37th Army, helping to hold a sector 50–115km east of Rostov.

As of August 1 the 230th was part of the Don Operational Group of North Caucasian Front and was attempting to hold south of the Manych River against Army Group "A", but the Front's armies were too weak to do more than delay and degrade the German advance. Later in the month the division, now down to an effective strength of well under 2,000 personnel, was taking up positions along the Terek River between the German forces and the direct route to the Baku oil fields. As it was no longer combat effective the 230th was officially disbanded on August 23 to provide reinforcements for other units in the Front. General Zakharov had already been given command of the 2nd Guards Rifle Division and he would go on to lead the 22nd Guards Rifle Corps for most of the rest of the war.

== 2nd Formation ==
A new 230th Rifle Division was formed in the 1st Guards Army on June 29, 1943, based on the 229th Rifle Brigade, in Southwestern Front and was immediately assigned to the 33rd Rifle Corps.

=== 229th Rifle Brigade ===
This unit was formed in March 1942 from military students and training units near Chita in Transbaikal Front. As a result, it was known both as the "Chitinskoi" brigade and as a Student (Kursantskii) brigade. In July it was shipped to the west and assigned to the reserves of Bryansk Front. At that time it had the following composition:

- 1st, 2nd, 3rd, 4th Rifle Battalions (450 men each)
- 1 Mortar Battalion
- 1 Artillery Battalion (mixed 45mm antitank guns and 122mm howitzers)
- Reconnaissance, Sapper and Signal Companies

In August the brigade entered the front lines in 38th Army, and in September during the fighting along the upper Don River it was shifted to 40th Army in Voronezh Front. By the end of October it was sent back to the Volga Military District to be rebuilt after heavy casualties in the largely fruitless attacks of the previous months. It returned to action in January 1943, now as part of Southwestern Front, just in time to swept up in the German counteroffensive at Kharkiv in February while serving with 1st Guards Army. When the fighting died down later that month the brigade was assigned to the 19th Rifle Corps in the same Army. This Corps was redesignated as 29th Guards Rifle Corps on April 16 and in May the 229th was moved to 33rd Corps where it remained until it was converted to the 230th Division.

Once it completed forming the new division had an order of battle similar to that of the 1st formation:

- 986th Rifle Regiment
- 988th Rifle Regiment
- 990th Rifle Regiment
- 370th Artillery Regiment
- 330th Antitank Battalion
- 349th Reconnaissance Company
- 554th Sapper Battalion
- 624th Signal Battalion (later 1458th Signal Company)
- 327th Medical/Sanitation Battalion
- 289th Chemical Defense (Anti-gas) Company
- 418th Motor Transport Company
- 555th Field Bakery
- 54th Divisional Veterinary Hospital
- 2049th Field Postal Station
- 1268th Field Office of the State Bank

The commander of 229th Brigade, Col. Andrei Antonovich Ukrainskii, continued to lead the new division. The personnel were noted as being 60 percent of Ukrainian nationality, 15 percent Turkmens, and only about 25 percent Russians and Siberians. Given the origins of the 229th in Siberia it can be seen that well over half of the 230th were new to the unit and not part of the parent formation.

== Into Ukraine ==
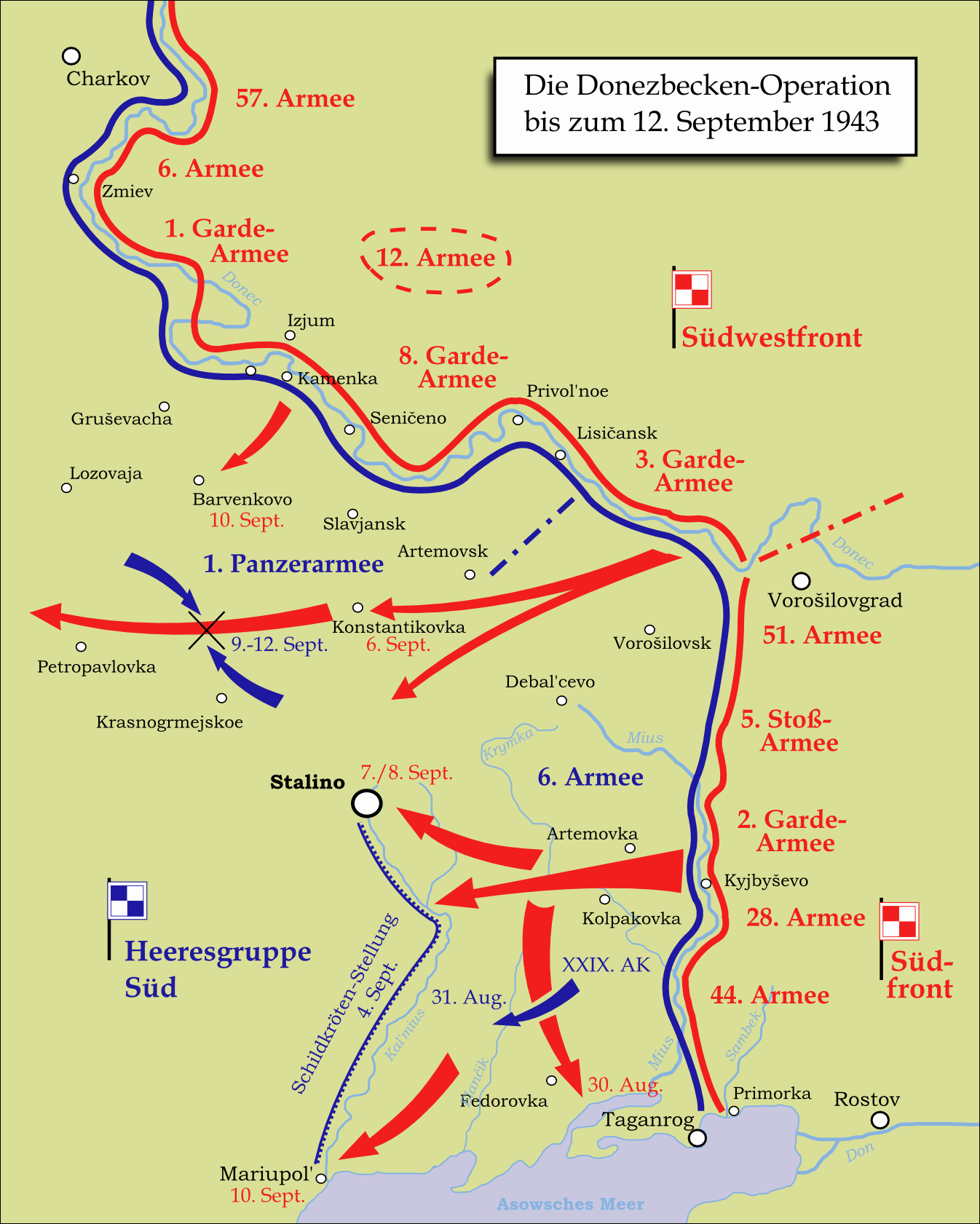
Second Donbas Operation, August-September 1943. Note the liberation of Stalino.

1st Guards Army took part in the largely-unsuccessful Izyum–Barvenkovo offensive beginning on July 17. The debut of the new division was not a success and on July 30 it was removed to the Reserve of the Supreme High Command for further training and integration. On August 30 it was reassigned to the 9th Rifle Corps of 5th Shock Army in Southern Front. Remarkably, the division would remain under this Corps command for the duration of the war.

The Donbas offensive had been renewed on August 13 and within days Southern Front finally broke through the German defenses along the Mius and began exploiting into the Donbas region. German efforts to close the gap on August 20 made some initial progress but failed due to a strong Soviet reaction. By August 23 1st Panzer Army was also in trouble with its army corps south of Izium reduced to a combat strength of just 5,800 men and unable to hold a continuous line. On the 31st Field Marshal E. von Manstein was finally authorized to withdraw both armies to the Kalmius River, effectively beginning the race to the Dniepr. On September 8 the division received a battle honor:

STALINO... 230th Rifle Division (Col. Ukrainskii, Andrei Antonovich)... The troops participating in the battles for the liberation of the Donbas region, during which they captured Stalino and other settlements, by the order of the Supreme High Command of 8 September 1943, and a commendation in Moscow, are given a salute of 20 artillery salvoes from 224 guns.

=== Lower Dniepr Offensive ===
During the rest of September Southern Front, with 5th Shock on its right (north) flank, forced the German 6th Army back through the Donbas towards the southernmost part of the Panther–Wotan line from Zaporozhe to Melitopol. On October 9 the Front (renamed 4th Ukrainian on October 20) renewed its offensive on both sides of the latter city. The 51st Army's battle for Melitopol lasted until October 23 after which 6th Army was in a near rout across the Nogay Steppe. The larger part of its forces fell back to form a bridgehead east of the Dniepr south of Nikopol with the 5th Shock and 2nd Guards Armies in pursuit. During November substantial German reserves were moved into the bridgehead in anticipation of an offensive to restore communications with Crimea, which had been cut off by the remainder of 4th Ukrainian Front. This came to nothing in the face of Soviet threats elsewhere, but the bridgehead remained strongly held. On November 29 Colonel Ukrainskii left the division and was replaced in command by Col. Yosif Anatolevich Kazakov. Also during the month the 9th Corps was transferred to 28th Army, still in 4th Ukrainian Front.

=== Nikopol-Krivoi Rog Offensive ===
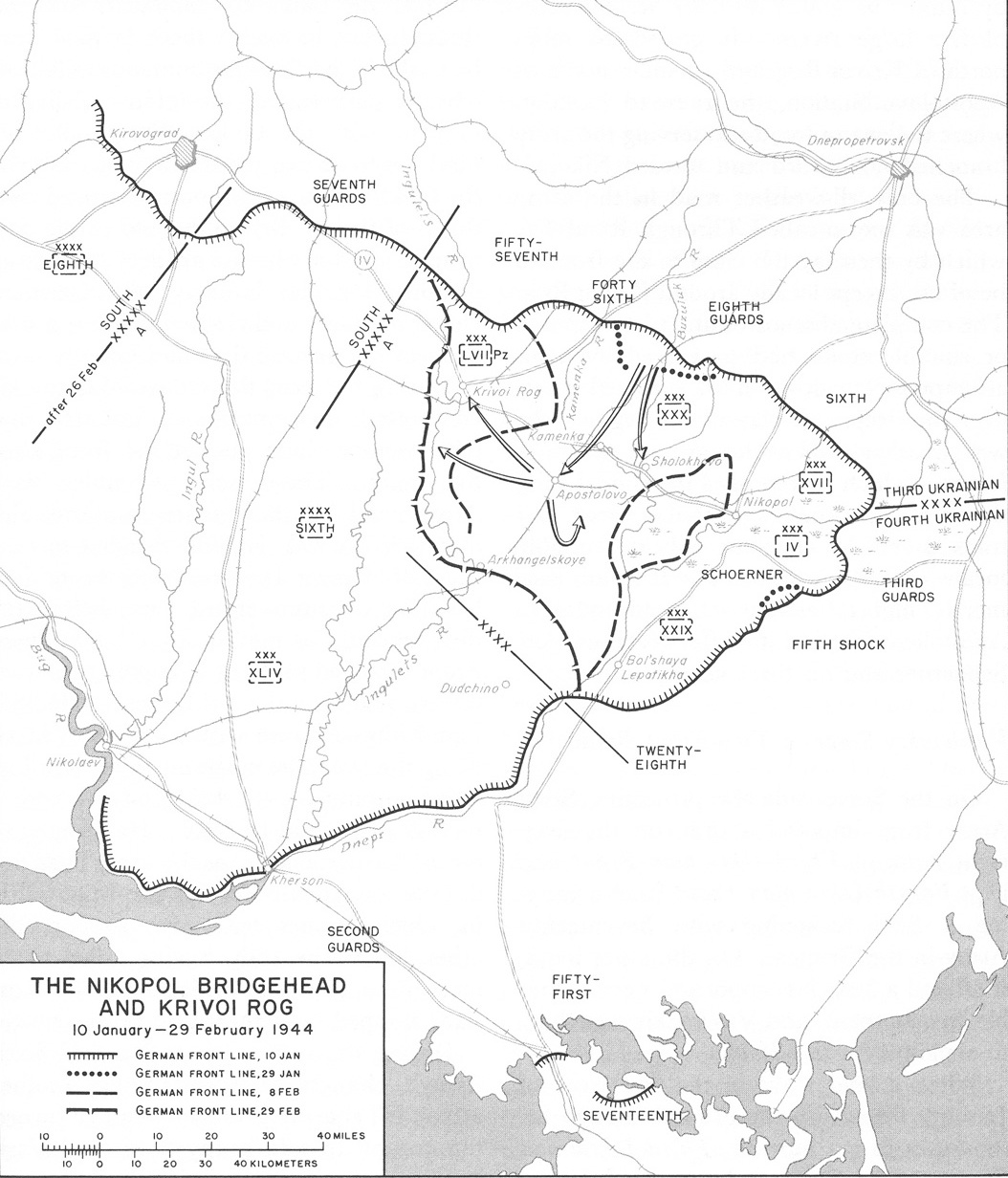
Nikopol-Krivoi Rog Offensive. Note position of 28th Army.

Until the end of February 1944 the 28th Army was involved in the Nikopol–Krivoi Rog offensive, facing the southern flank of the German-held Nikopol bridgehead over the Dniepr near Bolshaya Lepatikha until early that month when this was finally evacuated. The last German troops crossed the Dniepr on February 7 with the goal of forming a new line behind the Ingulets River. Due in part to an unusually mild winter the pace of operations on both sides remained slow through the rest of the month. During the month the Army was transferred to 3rd Ukrainian Front as 4th Ukrainian prepared for an offensive into the Crimea and the 9th Corps returned to 5th Shock Army, also in 3rd Ukrainian Front. In a further reassignment in March the Corps was shifted to the Front's 57th Army. At this time it consisted of the 230th, 118th and 301st Rifle Divisions and was under command of Maj. Gen. I. P. Roslyi.

=== Jassy-Kishinev Offensives ===
On March 26 the Front began a new offensive in the southern sector of western Ukraine. While its left-wing armies struck in the direction of Odessa, the 57th, 37th and 46th Armies on its right wing advanced toward the Dniestr River and the border with Romania. By early on April 11 the three Armies were pursuing disorganized German forces on the approaches to the east bank of the Dniestr, intending to force the river between April 18-20. During the day the 57th Army covered about 18km with 9th Corps advancing through Slavianoserbka toward Varnița, 24km south of Tașlîc on the Army's left wing. The Front commander, Army Gen. R. Ya. Malinovskii, had assigned 57th Army a 20km-wide sector of the Dniestr from Butor south to opposite Varnița. On this sector the river made a wide U-shaped bend to the west with Butor and Crasnogorca on either side of its entrance. German forces were defending this "bottleneck" as well as the west bank south of Crasnogorca.

The terrain on the east bank was generally low, flat and free of obstacles; the west bank was similar north and south of the bend but then rose to about 125m height about 3km from the riverbank and much closer directly west of the bend in the vicinity of the village of Talița. The forward detachments of 9th Corps reached the river's east bank late on April 11, facing the remnants of XXX Army Corps' 384th and 257th Infantry Divisions. General Roslyi recalled in his memoirs:

The corps reached the Dniestr without its authorized crossing equipment and could not count on reliable artillery and aviation support. The rasputitsa and the lack of roads forced serious alterations in our plans. Certainly we understood that the mission would not be easy... Gagen delineated the boundaries of our corps' attack and assigned us the mission of forcing the Dniestr from the march in the Bîcioc and Varnița sector and capturing a bridgehead on the opposite bank.

Due to the lack of bridging equipment and boats the 230th was forced to improvise rafts and other crossing means from available materials. A regiment of the 301st Division began crossing just south of Bîcioc at noon on April 12. Meanwhile, the 986th and 988th Rifle Regiments began getting across near Varnița, one battalion at a time, greatly aided by employing a locally procured ferryboat that the German forces had abandoned. About 3km to the south the 118th Division also forced a small bridgehead near Parcani.

Despite clearly stiffening German resistance the 230th and 301st managed to capture Hill 65.3 and all of Varnița by early the next day, while the 118th kept pace in the south. However, a new phase of the battle began as German artillery and air strikes struck the Corps' forward positions continuously; regrouped forces from the two German divisions began counterattacks designed to drive Roslyi's troops back into the river. Although 57th Army had managed to capture multiple small bridgeheads it had clearly failed to accomplish Malinovskii's larger mission and since most of these bridgeheads were dominated by German positions on nearby high ground they remained vulnerable. On April 14 the Army was ordered over to the defense.

==== Second Jassy-Kishinev Offensive ====
By August the 230th and 301st were still in 9th Corps, which was in the second echelon of 57th Army, reinforced with the 96th Tank Brigade. The Army was assigned a 14km-wide attack zone and a 4km sector for launching its main attack, which was defended by two battalions of the German 15th Infantry Division. The Corps was committed to the fighting on August 21, moving up to the area north of Lake Botno while covered by an 11km-wide smoke screen. On August 22, still under cover of smoke, 9th Corps joined the fighting on 57th Army's left flank, supported by tanks and by the SU-76s of the 1202 SU Regiment. This combined force crushed the enemy's resistance and by 0830 hrs. seized the strongpoints of Ursoiya and Kaushan station. By the close of the day the 230th had advanced up to 10-15km in the day's fighting and taken the village of Zaim. The advance continued the next day and 9th Corps attained all its objectives, advancing so aggressively that it was outrunning the corps that had been in the first echelon and 57th Army was in a position to envelop the XXX Army Corps. During August 24 the 3rd Ukrainian Front, in cooperation with 2nd Ukrainian Front, completed the encirclement of the German Chișinău group of forces and the following day 9th Corps captured Fyrladan and Molesht, beginning to split up the pocket. During the next few days the Corps returned to 5th Shock Army, and both the 230th and 301st Divisions would remain in this Army into the postwar.

== Into Poland and Germany ==
On September 6 the Army was removed to the Reserve of the Supreme High Command for redeployment, where it would remain until October 29. On this date it entered 1st Belorussian Front, which would soon come under command of Marshal G. K. Zhukov. 9th Corps, still under General Roslyi, now had the 248th Rifle Division under command as well. By the beginning of 1945 the 5th Shock was deployed along the Vistula River north of the bridgehead at Puławy. On January 3 Colonel Kazakov left the 230th and was replaced by Col. Daniil Kuzmich Shishkov. This officer had previously led the 229th Rifle Regiment of 8th Rifle Division and had been made a Hero of the Soviet Union on October 16, 1943, for his leadership in crossing operations of the Dniepr and Pripyat Rivers north of Kyiv. During 1944 he had graduated from the Voroshilov Academy.

The offensive began at 0855 hours on January 14. According to Zhukov's plan 5th Shock was to enter the Front's bridgehead over the Vistula at Magnuszew, south of Warsaw, prior to its start, attack on the first day and break through the German defense on a 6km-wide front along the Wybrowa–Stszirzina sector, supported by the artillery of the 2nd Guards Tank Army, and was then to develop the attack in the general direction of Branków and Goszczyn. Once the breakthrough was made the armor units and subunits in direct support of the Army's infantry were to unite as a mobile detachment to seize the second German defensive zone from the march with the goal of reaching the area of Bronisławów to Biała Rawska by the fourth day.

The offensive began with a reconnaissance-in-force following a 25-minute artillery preparation by all the Front's artillery. On the 5th Shock's and 8th Guards Army's sectors this quickly captured 3-4 lines of German trenches. The main forces of these armies took advantage of this early success and began advancing behind a rolling barrage, gaining as much as 12-13km during the day and through the night before going over to the pursuit on January 15. During January 18-19 the Front's mobile forces covered more than 100 km while the combined-arms armies advanced 50-55km. On January 26 Zhukov informed the STAVKA of his plans to continue the offensive. 5th Shock Army would attack in the general direction of Neudamm and then force the Oder River in the area of Alt Blessin before continuing to advance towards Nauen. On January 28 the 2nd Guards Tank and 5th Shock Armies broke through the Pomeranian Wall from the march and by the end of the month reached the Oder south of Küstrin and seized a bridgehead 12km in width and up to 3km deep. This would prove to be the limit of 5th Shock's advance until April. In recognition of this success the 986th Rifle Regiment was awarded the honorific "Pomeranian" while the 988th and 990th Rifle Regiments each received the Order of Suvorov, 3rd Degree, on April 5.

=== Battle of Berlin ===
At the start of the Berlin operation the 5th Shock was one of four combined-arms armies that made up the main shock group of 1st Belorussian Front. The Army deployed within the Küstrin bridgehead along a 9km-wide front between Letschin and Golzow and was to launch its main attack on its left wing on a 7km sector closer to the latter place. The 9th Corps had the 301st Division in the first echelon and the 248th in the second, but the 230th was serving as the Army's reserve. All three divisions had between 5,000 and 6,000 personnel on strength. The Army had an average of 43 tanks and self-propelled guns on each kilometre of the breakthrough front.

In the days just before the offensive the 3rd Shock Army was secretly deployed into the bridgehead which required considerable regrouping and covering operations by elements of 5th Shock. The Army then occupied jumping-off positions for a reconnaissance-in-force by battalions of five of its divisions while the remainder carried out more regular reconnaissance activities beginning early on the morning of April 14. After a 10-minute artillery preparation the 230th attacked with one battalion in cooperation with two reconnaissance battalions of the 175th Rifle Division (47th Army), broke through the first German trenches, advanced 2.5km and consolidated along the line from Neubarnim railway station to marker 6.4. In the course of two days of limited fighting the Front's troops advanced as much as 5km, ascertained and partly disrupted the German defensive system, and had overcome the thickest zone of minefields. The German command was also misled as to when the main offensive would occur.

In the event that offensive began on April 16. 5th Shock attacked at 0520 hours, following a 20-minute artillery preparation and with the aid of 36 searchlights. 9th Corps, with only the 301st in first echelon, had advanced 6km by the end of the day and seized Werbig. As a whole the Army broke through all three positions of the main German defensive zone, reached the second defensive position, and captured 400 prisoners. The next day 5th Shock resumed its offensive at 0700 hours, following a 10-minute artillery preparation. The Corps committed the 248th Division into battle and was cooperating with part of the 11th Tank Corps of 2nd Guards Tank Army. It spent most of the day engaged in stubborn fighting for the German strongpoint at Gusow, finally securing it by evening and, having now broken through both the first and second intermediate positions, reached a line from the eastern outskirts of Hermersdorf to the eastern bank of the Haussee, representing a total advance of 13km for the day. On April 18 the Corps, still backed by 11th Tanks, advanced 3km in stubborn fighting and by the end of the day had reached the area of Münchehofe. The following day it battled 11th SS Panzergrenadier Division Nordland for possession of the strongpoint of Buckow after a further advance of 6km; it had now reached and partially broken through the third German defensive zone.

On April 20 the Corps continued attacking to the west with two divisions in the first echelon. The advance was made through an area of lakes and swamps but nevertheless gained 6km, reaching a line from outside Hohenstein to Garzin, reaching the outer defense line of Berlin proper. The next day the Corps secured the Army's left flank, fighting in the area south of Altlandsberg, bringing it to the northeastern outskirts of the city. In heavy fighting on April 22 it cleared the area of Dahlwitz and Kaulsdorf and after an advance of 16km began fighting for the eastern part of Karlshorst.

Before dawn the next morning the 990th Rifle Regiment, commanded by Lt. Col. Aleksandr Ivanovich Lyovin, reached the Spree, which was to be crossed from the march. In this sector the river was up to 60m wide with concrete embankments. Lyovin ordered two companies to climb down to water level on improvised ladders, while rafts, empty barrels and washtubs, captured lifebelts from a sunken ship, and many other means were used to reach the far side. Mostly using hand grenades a small bridgehead was cleared and Lyovin crossed to take personal control. The bridgehead was secured when elements of the Dniepr Flotilla arrived to facilitate the crossing of the remainder of the regiment. For his leadership Lyovin would be made a Hero of the Soviet Union on May 31. He died on July 8, 1948, and was buried in Moscow. The commander of the 988th Rifle Regiment, Lt. Col. Andrei Matveevich Ozhogin, earned his Gold Star in a very similar operation on the same date. He would also receive his award on May 31. This officer continued to serve into peacetime but was killed in a car accident on July 20, 1949, near Moscow and was buried there. By the end of the day the 9th Corps had penetrated into the central part of Berlin, having advanced up to 4km. The commander of 5th Shock now received orders to develop the offensive along the eastern and western banks of the Spree and, in conjunction with 3rd Shock Army, to take the northern half of Berlin.

During April 26 the 9th Corps attacked along the south bank of the Spree between it and the Landwehr Canal. In the course of the fighting that day 5th Shock secured 115 city blocks. The next day the Corps exploited the successes of 8th Guards Army on its left to reach the line of the Wallstrasse–the Seydelstrasse–the Alte Jakobstrasse, clearing another 40 blocks. On April 28 it attacked toward the Tiergarten, clearing Anhalt Station from the south and closing to within 1,000m of the objective. When the city capitulated on May 2 the 988th and 990th Rifle Regiments, plus the 370th Artillery Regiment, were awarded the battle honor "Berlin".

== Postwar ==
On May 7, Maj. Gen. Aleksandr Gavrilovich Moiseevskii took over command of the division. He had previously led the 312th Rifle Division. The 230th and its subunits soon received additional honors. On May 28 the division was awarded the Order of Suvorov, 2nd Degree, for its breakthrough into Berlin. On June 11 the 986th Rifle Regiment was given the Order of the Red Banner, while the 554th Sapper Battalion and the 624th Signal Battalion were each presented with the Order of the Red Star, all for their roles in the fighting for Berlin. The division was briefly part of the Group of Soviet Forces in Germany as a separate division in 5th Shock, but in October it was redesignated as the 17th Mechanized Division and withdrawn to the Moscow Military District where it served until it was disbanded on March 8, 1947.
