= Grigoriopol =

Town in Transnistria, Moldova

Grigoriopol Григориопол (Moldovan Cyrillic) Григорио́поль (Russian) Григоріо́поль (Ukrainian)
- Town
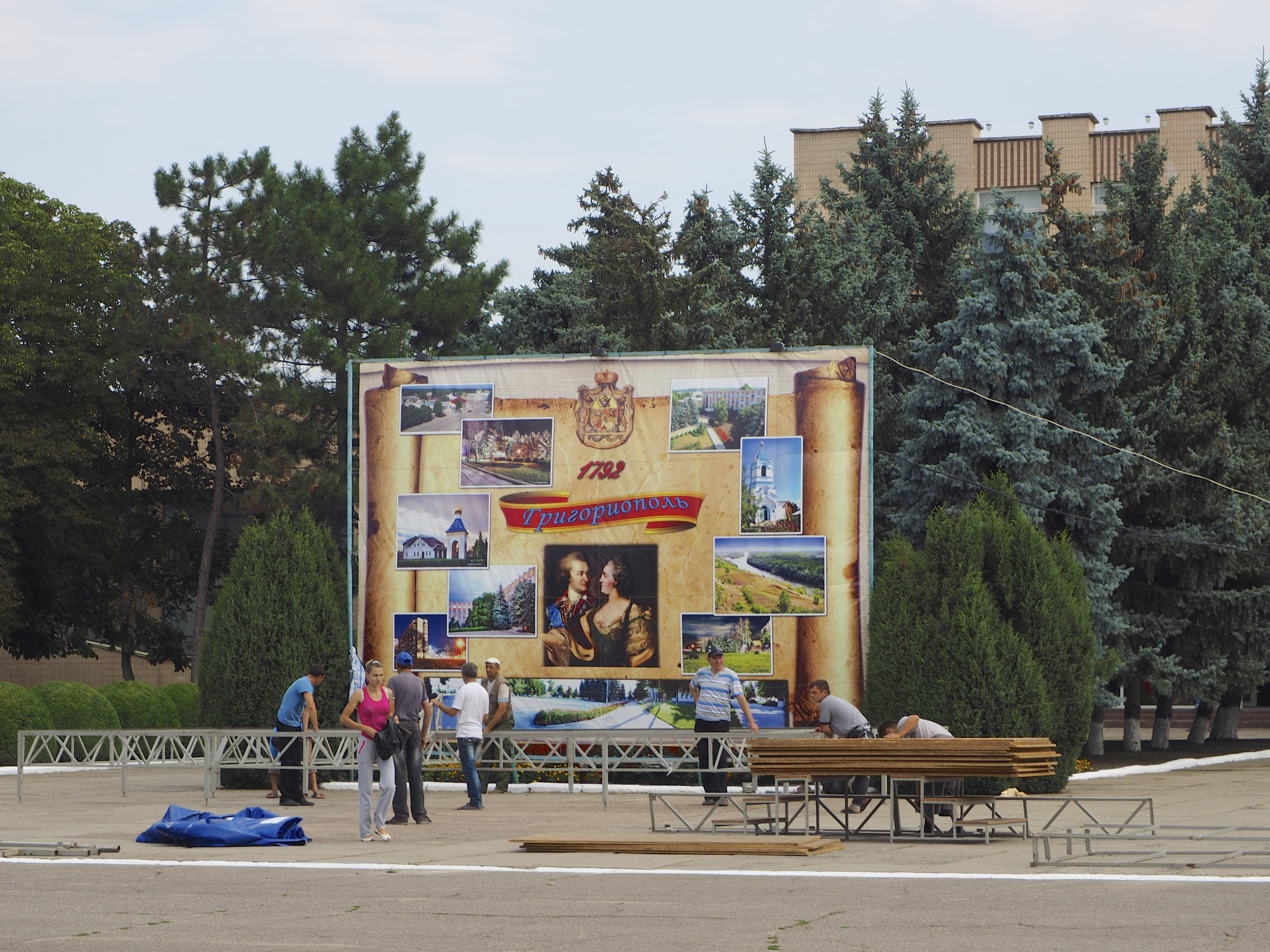
- Bus station

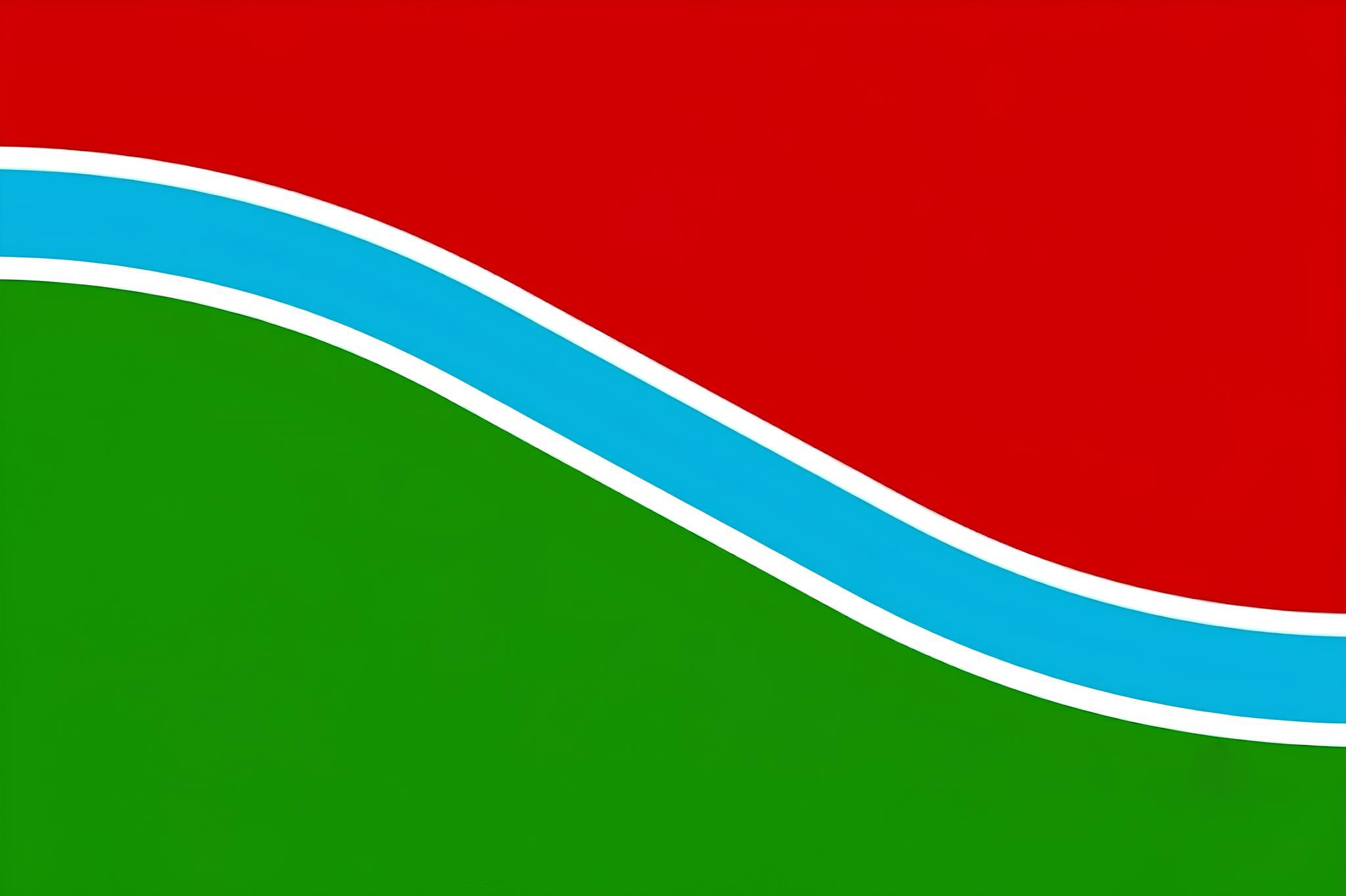
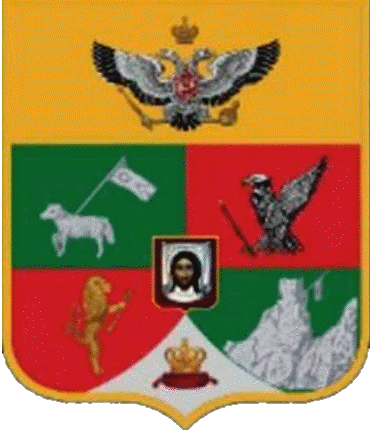
- Flag Coat of arms

- Location of Grigoriopol in Moldova
- Coordinates: 47°9′1″N 29°17′33″E
- Country (de jure): Moldova
- Country (de facto): Transnistria (Note: Transnistria's political status is disputed. It considers itself to be an independent state, but this is not recognised by any UN member state. The Moldovan government and the international community consider Transnistria a part of Moldova's territory.)
- District: Grigoriopol District
- Elevation: 41 m (135 ft)

Population (2004)
  - Total: 11,473
- Website: grig-admin.idknet.com

Grigoriopol (Romanian pronunciation: [ɡriɡoriˈopol], Moldovan Cyrillic: Григориопол, Russian: Григорио́поль, romanized: Grigoriopol, Ukrainian: Григоріо́поль, romanized: Hryhoriopol or Григоріопіль, Hryhoriopil) is a town in the Administrative-Territorial Units of the Left Bank of the Dniester, Moldova. It is the seat of the Grigoriopol District of Transnistria. The city had a population of 11,473 in 2004.

== Geography and administrative composition ==
The city is located on the left (eastern) bank of the river Dniester, in central Transnistria. Distance to the closest railway station is 45 kilometers. Grigoriopol is composed of the city itself and the small village of Krasnoe (Красное).

== History ==
Grigoriopol was established in 1792 as an Armenian settlement. According to the 1926 Soviet census, 45,7% of the inhabitants identified as Moldovans, and 15,4% as Ukrainians.

In 1996 and in 2002, the town was the centre of a dispute regarding the attempts of local Moldovan inhabitants to use the Romanian language (written with Latin script characters) in the local school, which is against the policy of the government of Transnistria. The Transnistrian press attacked the local authorities "that allowed the fifth column of Moldova in Transnistria to operate". The head of the Parent-Teacher Association of the school, Mihai Speian, was arrested by the Transnistrian authorities on August 28, 2002. He was released on September 12, following a protest by the Organization for Security and Co-operation in Europe mission in Moldova. The school was moved to the village of Doroțcaia, Dubăsari district, which is in the area controlled by the Republic of Moldova.

== Demographics ==
Historical population
Year	Pop.	±%
1897	7,605	—
1989	11,712	+54.0%
2004	11,473	−2.0%

According to the 2004 Census in Transnistria, the city itself had 11,473 inhabitants, including 5,570 Moldovans (48.55%), 3,275 Russians (28.55%), 2,248 Ukrainians (19.59%), 83 Germans, 67 Belarusians, 63 Bulgarians, 46 Armenians, 39 Poles, 26 Gagauzians, 14 Jews, and 42 others and non-declared.

In 1897, the ethnic make-up, by mother tongue, was 49.2% Romanian, 24.1% Russian, 10.9% Jewish, 9.3% Ukrainian, 5.3% Armenian.

== Notable people ==
- Oleksandr Danylyuk (born 1975 in Grigoriopol), Ukrainian politician and former finance minister of Ukraine
- Roman Rozna (born 1976 in Grigoriopol), a male hammer thrower from Moldova, competed in the 2000, 2004 and 2008 Summer Olympics

== See also ==
- Grigoriopol transmitter in Maiac, near Grigoriopol
