= Teiu =

Teiu may refer to:

== Romania ==
- Teiu, Argeș, a commune in Argeș County
- Teiu, a village in Horea Commune, Alba County
- Teiu, a village in Orodel Commune, Dolj County
- Teiu, a village in Lăpugiu de Jos Commune, Hunedoara County
- Teiu, a village in Galicea Commune, Vâlcea County
- Teiul, a village in Amărăști Commune, Vâlcea County

== Moldova ==
- Teiu, Transnistria, a commune in Transnistria
