= 312th Division =

312th Division may refer to:

- 312th Division (Imperial Japanese Army)
- 312th Rifle Division, Soviet Union
- 312th Division (Vietnam)

== See also ==
- List of military divisions by number
