= Hîrtop, Transnistria =

Hîrtop Гыртоп (Russian) Гиртоп (Ukrainian)
- Commune
- Location within Moldova
- Coordinates: 47°14′59″N 29°21′47″E
- Country (de jure): Moldova
- Country (de facto): Transnistria (Note: Transnistria's political status is disputed. It considers itself to be an independent state, but this is not recognised by any UN member state. The Moldovan government and the international community consider Transnistria a part of Moldova's territory.)
- Elevation: 122 m (400 ft)
- Time zone: UTC+2 (EET)
  - Summer (DST): UTC+3 (EEST)

Hîrtop (Moldovan Cyrillic: Хыртоп; Russian: Гыртоп, romanized: Gyrtop; Ukrainian: Гиртоп, romanized: Hyrtop) is a commune in the Grigoriopol sub-district of Transnistria, Moldova. It is composed of four villages: Bruslachi (Бруслаки), Hîrtop, Marian (Маріян, Мариян) and Mocreachi (Мокряки). It is currently under the administration of the breakaway government of the Transnistrian Moldovan Republic.

According to the 2004 census, the village's population was 799, of which 511 (63.95%) were Moldovans (Romanians), 217 (27.15%) Ukrainians and 64 (8.01%) Russians.
