= Speia, Transnistria =

Speia Спея (Ukrainian)
- Village
- Location within Moldova
- Coordinates: 46°58′47″N 29°19′35″E
- Country (de jure): Moldova
- Country (de facto): Transnistria (Note: Transnistria's political status is disputed. It considers itself to be an independent state, but this is not recognised by any UN member state. The Moldovan government and the international community consider Transnistria a part of Moldova's territory.)
- Elevation: 43 m (141 ft)
- Time zone: UTC+2 (EET)
  - Summer (DST): UTC+3 (EEST)

Speia (Moldovan Cyrillic, Russian, and Ukrainian: Спея, romanized: Speya) is a village in the Grigoriopol sub-district of Transnistria, Moldova. It is currently under the administration of the breakaway government of the Transnistrian Moldovan Republic.

According to the 2004 census, the population of the village was 2,679 inhabitants, of which 2,584 (96.45%) were Moldovans (Romanians), 20 (0.74%) Ukrainians and 41 (1.53%) Russians.
