= Maiac =

Maiac Mayak
- City
- Location within Moldova
- Coordinates: 47°14′15″N 29°23′9″E
- Country (de jure): Moldova
- Country (de facto): Transnistria (Note: Transnistria's political status is disputed. It considers itself to be an independent state, but this is not recognised by any UN member state. The Moldovan government and the international community consider Transnistria a part of Moldova's territory.)
- District: Grigoriopol District
- Time zone: UTC+2 (EET)
  - Summer (DST): UTC+3 (EEST)
- Climate: Dfb

Maiac (Moldovan Cyrillic: Маяк; Russian: Мая́к, romanized: Mayak; Ukrainian: Маяк, romanized: Maiak) is an urban-type settlement (according to Transnistrian legislation) or town (according to Moldovan legislation) in the Grigoriopol District, Transnistria, Moldova, eleven kilometres (seven miles) northeast of Grigoriopol, on the Ukrainian border. According to the unofficial census of 2004, the population of the town was 1,221 inhabitants, of which: 351 (28.74%) Moldovans (Romanians), 582 (47.66%) Ukrainians and 239 (19.57%) Russians.

== Transmitter ==
The Transnistrian Radio and Television Center (TRTC) is located in Maiac. It is a large broadcasting centre for short- and mediumwave, which was built up in the years between 1968 and 1975. It covers an area of 8.2 square kilometres (3 3/16 sq mi), and housed at the end of 1980s 20 transmitters. In 1997 two masts – one 350 metres (1,150 ft) and the other 250 m (820 ft) – of the facility used for medium wave broadcasting collapsed as a result of icing.

In October 2007, the Russian unitary enterprise Russian Television and Radio Networks acquired 100% of shares of the TRTC for $3,314,388.

The Grigoriopol transmission station in Pridnestrovje/Transnistru only transmits programs from Trans World Radio at 1548 kHz. Instead, Radio Rossii from Moscow is now broadcasting on the 999 kHz frequency, since April 5, 2022, around the clock and with a transmission power of 1000 kW.
