= Hlinaia, Grigoriopol, Transnistria =

Hlinaia Глиное (Russian) Глинне (Ukrainian)
- Village
- Location within Moldova
- Coordinates: 47°13′43″N 29°24′52″E
- Country (de jure): Moldova
- Country (de facto): Transnistria (Note: Transnistria's political status is disputed. It considers itself to be an independent state, but this is not recognised by any UN member state. The Moldovan government and the international community consider Transnistria a part of Moldova's territory.)
- Elevation: 97 m (318 ft)
- Time zone: UTC+2 (EET)
  - Summer (DST): UTC+3 (EEST)

Hlinaia (Moldovan Cyrillic: Хлиная, Russian: Глиное, romanized: Glinoye, Ukrainian: Глинне, romanized: Glinne) is a village in the Grigoriopol sub-district of Transnistria, Moldova. The town of Hlinaia was founded in 1809 by German Evangelical emigrants under the name of Glückstal. It has since 1990 been administered as a part of the breakaway Pridnestrovian Moldavian Republic.

According to the 2004 AD census, the village's population was 2,718, of which 728 (26.78%) were Moldovans (Romanians), 939 (34.54%) were Ukrainians, and 859 (31.6%) were Russians.
