= Mălăiești, Transnistria =

Mălăiești Малаешты (Russian) Малає́шти (Ukrainian)
- Commune
- Location within Moldova
- Coordinates: 46°58′53″N 29°32′54″E
- Country (de jure): Moldova
- Country (de facto): Transnistria (Note: Transnistria's political status is disputed. It considers itself to be an independent state, but this is not recognised by any UN member state. The Moldovan government and the international community consider Transnistria a part of Moldova's territory.)
- Elevation: 43 m (141 ft)
- Time zone: UTC+2 (EET)
  - Summer (DST): UTC+3 (EEST)

Mălăiești (Moldovan Cyrillic: Мэлэешть, Ukrainian: Малаєшти, romanized: Malayeshty, Russian: Малаешты, romanized: Malayeshty) is one of the larger communes in the Grigoriopol sub-district, in the disputed territory of Transnistria, internationally recognised as part of the Republic of Moldova. Its name is derived from Romanian "mălai", which means "millet or maize flour", with suffix -ești. It is composed of two villages, Cernița (Черниця, Черница) and Mălăiești.

According to the 2004 census, the village's population was 5,364, of which 5,128 (95.6%) were Moldovans (Romanians), 120 (2.23%) Ukrainians and 92 (1.71%) Russians.

== Notable natives ==
- Vladimir Beșleagă, Moldovan writer
- Mihail Grebencea, Soviet Mathematician, Number Theorist
- Natalia Gavrilița (born 1977), Prime minister of Moldova
