= -ești =

Romanian place name suffix

The suffix -ești (pronounced [eʃtʲ], sometimes changed to -ăști [əʃtʲ]) is widespread in Romanian placenames. It is the plural of the possessive suffix -escu, formerly used for patronyms and currently widespread in family names. Obsolete spellings are -esci and -eșci, used for a few decades until the beginning of the 20th century.

Overall, this ending is part of the names of 14.8% of the Romanian towns and villages (2,038 out of 13,724) and 11.4% of the Moldovan towns and villages (144 out of 1,254). In some areas in Romania, more than half of the placenames have this suffix.

== Placenames ==
=== Romania ===
- Brănești
- Bucureșci, Hunedoara County
- București (Bucharest)
- Comănești
- Costinești
- Dărăști-Ilfov, Ilfov County
- Fetești
- Mărășești
- Moinești
- Negrești-Oaș
- Onești
- Pitești
- Ploiești
- Scornicești
- Zărnești

=== Moldova ===
- Fălești
- Florești
- Hîncești
- Mălăiești, Transnistria
- Șoldănești
- Telenești
- Vulcănești

== See also ==
- -ovo/-evo, a Slavic suffix
