= Vinogradnoe =

Vinogradnoe Виноградное (Russian) Виноградне (Ukrainian)
- Village
- Location within Moldova
- Coordinates: 47°5′0″N 29°29′29″E
- Country (de jure): Moldova
- Country (de facto): Transnistria (Note: Transnistria's political status is disputed. It considers itself to be an independent state, but this is not recognised by any UN member state. The Moldovan government and the international community consider Transnistria a part of Moldova's territory.)
- Elevation: 89 m (292 ft)
- Time zone: UTC+2 (EET)
  - Summer (DST): UTC+3 (EEST)

Vinogradnoe (Moldovan Cyrillic and Russian: Виноградное, romanized: Vinogradnoye; Ukrainian: Виноградне, romanized: Vynohradne) (also known as Savvi) is a village in the Grigoriopol sub-district of Transnistria, Moldova. It is currently under the administration of the breakaway government of the Transnistrian Moldovan Republic.

According to the 2004 census, the village's population was 653, of which 176 (26.95%) were Moldovans (Romanians), 286 (43.79%) Ukrainians and 153 (23.43%) Russians.
