= Colosova =

Colosova Колосово (Russian) Колосове (Ukrainian)
- Commune
- Location within Moldova
- Coordinates: 47°19′44″N 29°34′2″E
- Country (de jure): Moldova
- Administrative Unit: Left Bank of the Dniester
- Country (de facto): Transnistria (Note: Transnistria's political status is disputed. It considers itself to be an independent state, but this is not recognised by any UN member state. The Moldovan government and the international community consider Transnistria a part of Moldova's territory.)
- District: Grigoriopol
- Elevation: 139 m (456 ft)
- Time zone: UTC+2 (EET)
  - Summer (DST): UTC+3 (EEST)

Colosova (Moldovan Cyrillic: Колосова, Russian: Колосово, romanized: Kolosovo, Ukrainian: Колосове, romanized: Kolosove) is a commune in the Grigoriopol District of Transnistria, an unrecognised state claimed by Moldova. It is composed of three villages: Colosova, Crasnaia Besarabia (Червона Бесарабія, Красная Бессарабия) and Pobeda (Побєда, Победа). It is currently under the administration of the breakaway government of the Transnistrian Moldovan Republic. The village of Colosova was part of the Glückstal Colonies, known during the 19th Century as Bergdorf and inhabited by Germans farmers.

According to the 2004 census, the village's population was 887, of which 204 (22.99%) were Moldovans (Romanians), 415 (46.78%) were Ukrainians and 162 (18.26%) were Russians.
