= Moldovan alphabet =

Moldovan alphabet may refer to:

- Moldovan Cyrillic alphabet
- Romanian alphabet
