= Tașlîc =

Tașlîc Ташлик (Ukrainian)
- Commune
- Location within Moldova
- Coordinates: 47°4′9″N 29°23′40″E
- Country (de jure): Moldova
- Country (de facto): Transnistria (Note: Transnistria's political status is disputed. It considers itself to be an independent state, but this is not recognised by any UN member state. The Moldovan government and the international community consider Transnistria a part of Moldova's territory.)
- Elevation: 29 m (95 ft)
- Time zone: UTC+2 (EET)
  - Summer (DST): UTC+3 (EEST)

Tașlîc (Moldovan Cyrillic and Russian: Ташлык, romanized: Tashlyk; Ukrainian: Ташлик, romanized: Tashlyk) is a commune and village in Transnistria, Moldova, the second largest commune in the Grigoriopol sub-district. Its name is derived from the Turkic word taşlık, meaning "stony place". The majority of the population of the commune is Moldovan, while an important part of the population is of Russian descent. According to the 2004 census, the population of the commune was 3,224 inhabitants, of which 3,163 (98.1%) were Moldovans (Romanians), 8 (0.24%) Ukrainians and 43 (1.33%) Russians.
