= Crasnogorca =

Crasnogorca Красногорка (Russian) Красногірка (Ukrainian)
- Village
- Location within Moldova
- Coordinates: 46°57′46″N 29°27′23″E
- Country (de jure): Moldova
- Country (de facto): Transnistria (Note: Transnistria's political status is disputed. It considers itself to be an independent state, but this is not recognised by any UN member state. The Moldovan government and the international community consider Transnistria a part of Moldova's territory.)
- Elevation: 66 m (217 ft)
- Time zone: UTC+2 (EET)
  - Summer (DST): UTC+3 (EEST)
- Postal code: MD-4017

Crasnogorca (Moldovan Cyrillic and Russian: Красногорка, romanized: Krasnogorka; Ukrainian: Красногірка, romanized: Krasnohirka) is a village in the Grigoriopol sub-district of Transnistria, Moldova. It is currently under the administration of the breakaway government of the Transnistrian Moldovan Republic. Prior to World War II it was in and on the western border of Ukraine, directly across the Dniester River from Romania.

According to the 2004 census, the population of the village was 1,173 inhabitants, of which 307 (26.17%) were Moldovans (Romanians), 670 (57.11%) Ukrainians and 169 (14.4%) Russians.

== Notable people ==
- Boris Marian (born 1934), writer, translator, journalist and former Soviet dissident
