= Church of the Holy Trinity, Dubienka =

Orthodox church in Dubienka, Poland

Church of the Holy Trinity
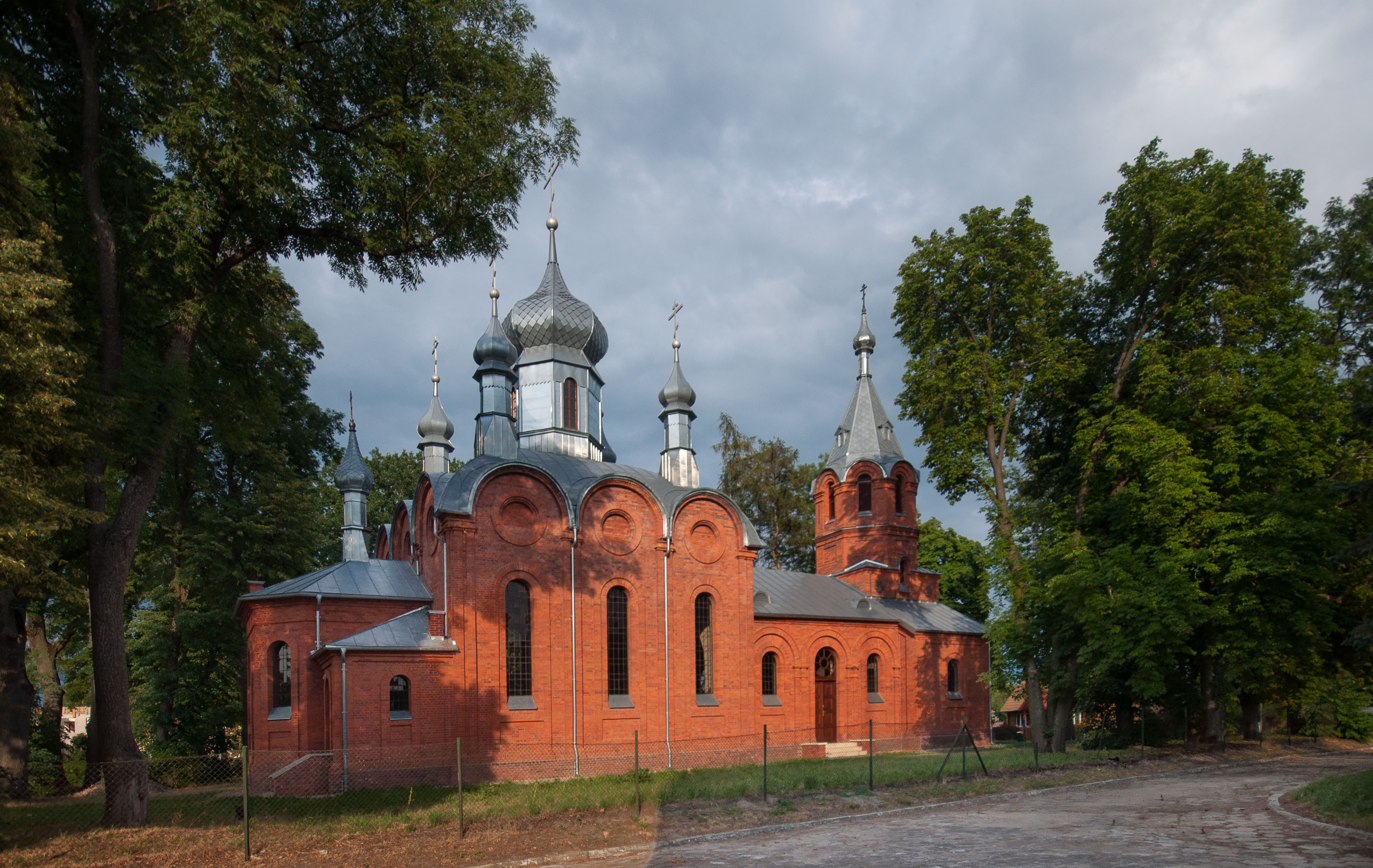
- View of the church from the western side
- Church of the Holy Trinity
- 51°02′49.5″N 23°53′30.6″E
- Location: Dubienka
- Country: Poland
- Denomination: Eastern Orthodoxy
- Churchmanship: Polish Orthodox Church

History
- Status: inactive Orthodox church
- Founder: Kławdij Paschałow
- Dedication: Trinity

Architecture
- Style: Russian Revival
- Completed: 1909
- Closed: 1946

Specifications
- Materials: brick

Administration
- Diocese: Diocese of Lublin and Chełm

The Church of the Holy Trinity is an Orthodox filial church in Dubienka. It belongs to the Parish of St. John the Theologian in Chełm, within the Chełm Deanery of the Diocese of Lublin and Chełm of the Polish Orthodox Church. The church is located in the center of the village, at the intersection of 3 Maja and Cerkiewna streets.

In the 18th century, a Uniate parish existed in Dubienka, most likely with its own wooden church. In 1875, the pastoral center in Dubienka was incorporated into the Russian Orthodox Church along with the entire Chełm Eparchy. At the end of the century, the church was destroyed in a fire, and in 1909, it was replaced by a new brick religious building, funded by the Moscow merchant Kławdij Paschałow (who also financially supported the construction of several other Orthodox churches in the Chełm Eparchy). During the interwar period, the church functioned as a filial temple.

The building was closed for religious purposes in 1945 and served as a warehouse for several decades. Some of its furnishings were transferred to the newly established Church of Saints Peter and Paul in Słupsk, while other elements were looted, and the frescoes inside were damaged. Renovation work began only after 1990, and in the early 21st century, the church was returned to the Polish Orthodox Church. However, it remains closed due to its poor technical condition.

== History ==
=== Orthodox parish ===
The first church in Dubienka was built in 1599, following the town's granting of municipal rights. Despite the fact that the Orthodox Bishop of Chełm, Dionysius, accepted the Union of Brest in 1596 – bringing the entire ecclesiastical administration under a new jurisdiction – the church was likely consecrated as an Orthodox place of worship at the time of its construction.

=== Uniate parish ===
In the 18th century, a Uniate parish existed in Dubienka. It had its own church, though only partial details about its appearance have survived. It was a wooden structure with 13 windows, four of which were fitted with lead, while the others had wooden frames. Four of the windows were barred. The church's bell tower was located above the church porch and housed three bells. Historical sources contain no descriptions of the interior furnishings, apart from a mention that the church contained seven altars. A Uniate cemetery was located nearby. The number of worshippers attending the church in the 18th century is difficult to estimate. Some sources suggest that the church was not built until 1838.

The church was transferred to the Eparchy of Warsaw of the Russian Orthodox Church following the Conversion of Chełm Eparchy in 1875. By 1878, a parish school operated alongside the Orthodox church in the town. Reports indicate that the forced conversion of the Uniate parish to Orthodoxy met with active resistance from the local population.

In 1899, Orthodox Christians made up 14.6% of Dubienka's 7,000 inhabitants. By the end of the 19th century, the church was completely destroyed by fire.

=== Orthodox church of 1909 ===
A new church was built on the site of the former Uniate church in Dubienka in 1909. It was part of a group of churches in the Chełm Land funded by the Moscow merchant Kławdij Paschałow.

After Poland regained its independence, the Ministry of Religious Affairs and Public Education did not include the Dubienka church in the list of officially registered parish churches in the Lublin Voivodeship. By 1921, the church remained inactive, as Orthodox clergy and the local Orthodox population had gone into exile in 1915. The church was sporadically opened for worship in 1919. By 1923, the Dubienka church was re-opened as a filial church (it is unclear which parish it belonged to), operating within the Hrubieszów Deanery of the Diocese of Warsaw and Chełm. It became one of 16 active Orthodox churches in the Hrubieszów County. In the 1930s, the interior of the building was further decorated: religious frescoes were added, a mosaic was laid on the floor, and new icons were installed.

=== Closure and vandalism of the church ===
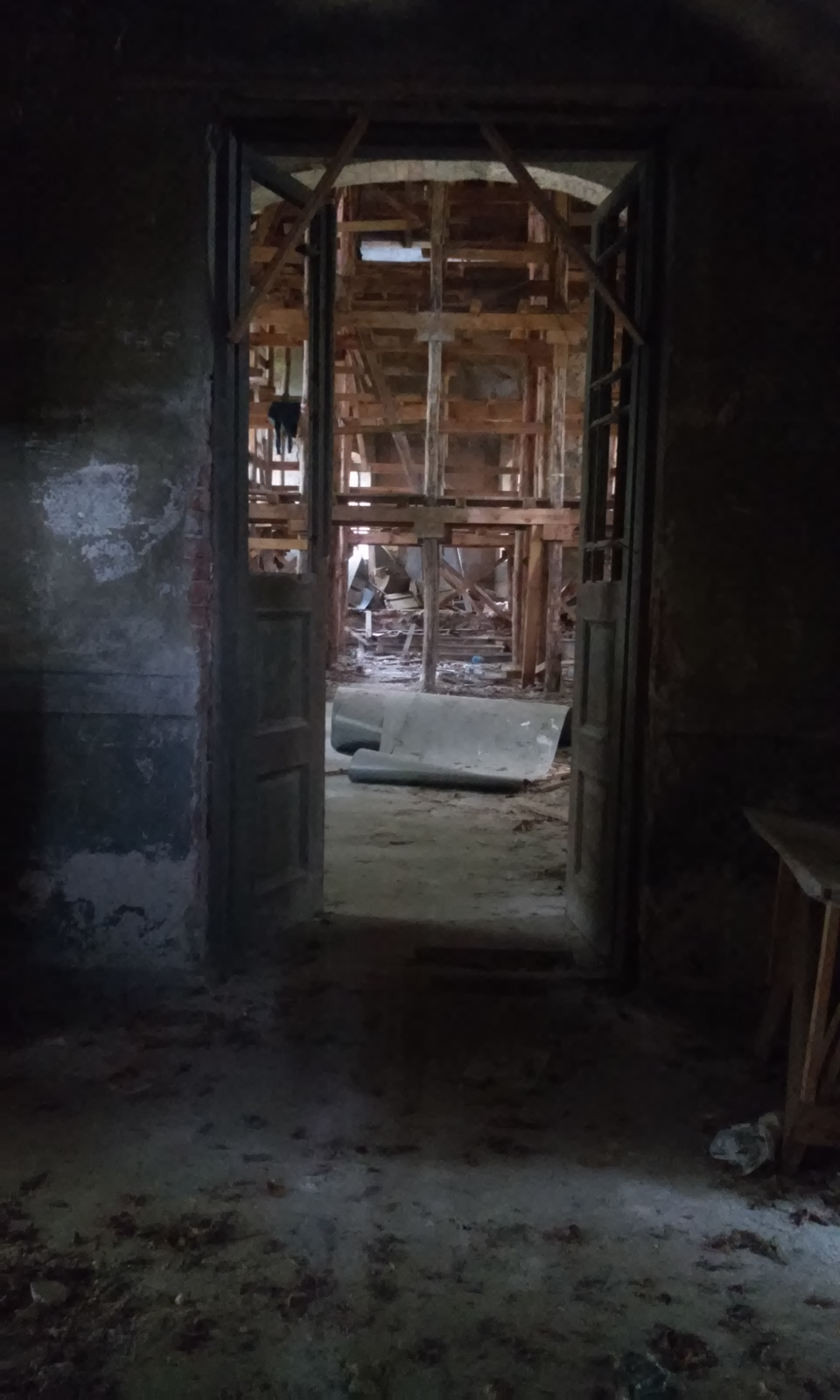
Destroyed interior of the church (2015)

In 1945, the temporary Soviet administration ordered the closure of the church. The building was repurposed as a transit point for cattle being transported from Germany to the Soviet Union. The church was eventually abandoned in 1946 after the completion of the forced resettlement of the Ukrainian population to the Soviet Union. At this time, the Orthodox community ceased to exist in Dubienka. Some of the church's furnishings were moved to a church in Słupsk. The building was subsequently used by the local cooperative Samopomoc Chłopska, functioning as a warehouse for artificial fertilizers. In 1956, permission was granted to convert the building into a school, but in reality, it was used as a grain storage warehouse and later completely abandoned, leading to its further degradation over many years. Church furnishings were stolen, and the decorative fence surrounding the church grounds was also taken. The steps leading to the bell tower, frescoes, and plaster were destroyed. The building was not secured against further ruin.

=== Attempts at renovation ===
The church was added to the register of historical monuments on 20 January 1990 under number A/378. In the same year, the first renovation since the resettlements of the Orthodox population began, financed by the local municipality. However, lack of funds prevented its completion. Four years later, the conservation officer, in cooperation with the Archbishop of Lublin and Chełm, Abel, secured the church from further damage and cataloged the surviving church furnishings. The roof of the church was renovated. Plans were made to restore the building for liturgical use and to designate part of the space for a museum exhibition. Since the early 21st century, the ruined church has again become the property of the Polish Orthodox Church, but due to its poor technical condition, it remains unused.

== Architecture ==
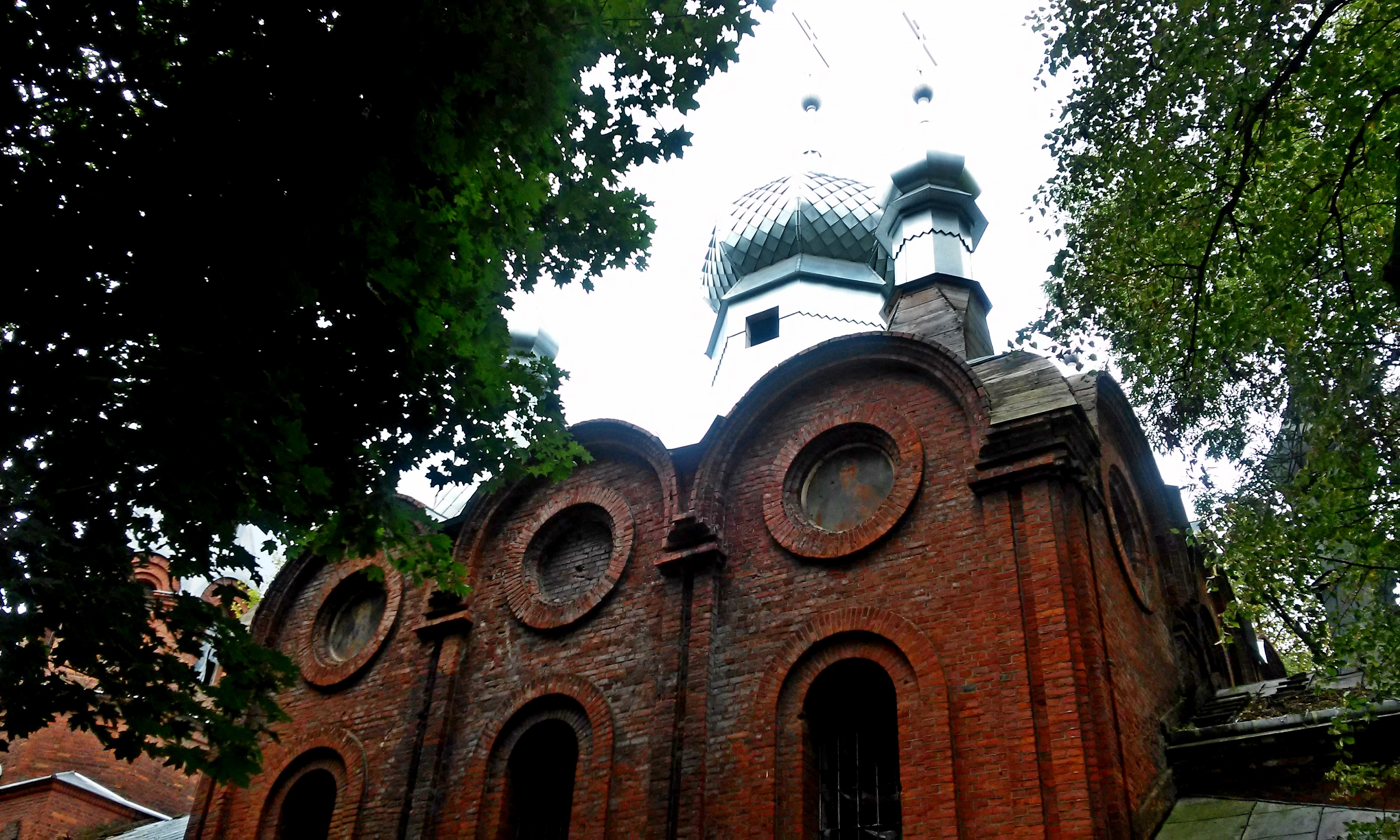
Side elevation of the church. The damaged frescoes depicting saints are visible

The church was built in the Russian Revival style, with a neo-Russian variant, using red brick. This choice of material harkens back to the medieval sacred architecture of Novgorod. It is a tripartite structure with a square nave, covered by a roof topped with an octagonal lantern and four smaller turrets, each topped with smaller onion domes. The tripartite chancel is closed by a polygonal apse, above which another turret with a dome is placed. The bell tower, featuring a tented roof and a small onion dome, rises above the church porch, which has a gabled roof. The front elevation of the church includes a porch with a two-pitched roof. This element also has a turret with a dome, shaped traditionally for Russian sacred architecture.

The decorative details on the outer walls of the church are reduced to arched window forms and friezes. Originally, there were medallions with images of Orthodox saints on the exterior elevations. The church is also decorated with frames featuring plant and geometric motifs. Inside, remnants of polychrome decoration have survived.

Identical plans were used for the construction of churches in Suchawa and Grodysławice.
