= Teiu, Transnistria =

Teiu Тея (Ukrainian)
- Commune
- Location within Moldova
- Coordinates: 46°57′17″N 29°23′56″E
- Country (de jure): Moldova
- Country (de facto): Transnistria (Note: Transnistria's political status is disputed. It considers itself to be an independent state, but this is not recognised by any UN member state. The Moldovan government and the international community consider Transnistria a part of Moldova's territory.)
- Elevation: 20 m (66 ft)
- Time zone: UTC+2 (EET)
  - Summer (DST): UTC+3 (EEST)

Teiu (Moldovan Cyrillic: Тею; Russian and Ukrainian: Тея, romanized: Teya) is a commune in the Grigoriopol sub-district of Transnistria, Moldova. It is composed of two villages, Teiu and Tocmagiu (Moldovan Cyrillic: Токмаӂу; Ukrainian: Токмазея, romanized: Tokmazeya). It is currently under the administration of the breakaway government of the Transnistrian Moldovan Republic.

According to the 2004 census, the population of the village was 3,603 inhabitants, of which 3,555 (98.66%) were Moldovans (Romanians), 5 (0.13%) Ukrainians and 27 (0.74%) Russians.

== Notable people ==
- Grigory Marakutsa (born 1942), politician
