= Grigoriopol District =

Grigoriopol
- district
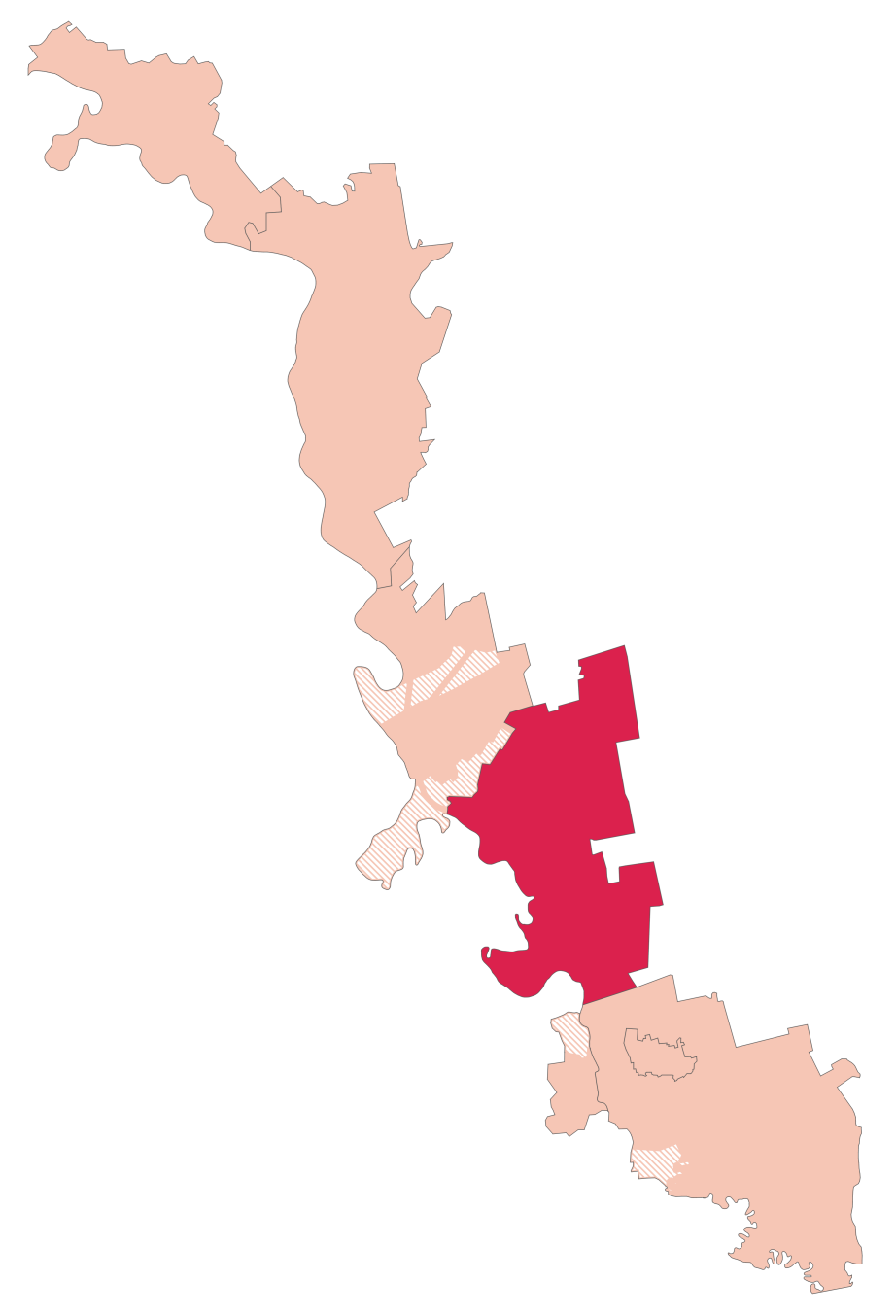
- Country: Moldova
- self-proclaimed state: Transnistria
- Administrative center: Grigoriopol

Government
  - Heads of the State Administration of the Grigoriopol District and the Grigoriopol City: Yuriy Larchenko

Area
  - Total: 822 km^{2} (317 sq mi)

Population (2015)
  - Total: 40,000
- Time zone: UTC+2 (EET)
  - Summer (DST): UTC+3 (EEST)

Grigoriopol District (Romanian: Raionul Grigoriopol; Russian: Григориопольский район; Ukrainian: Григоріопольський район) is an administrative district of Transnistria (de facto) in Moldova (de jure). It is located along the river Dniester, in the center of Transnsitria. Its seat is the city of Grigoriopol, located at 47°8′N 29°18′E, on the Dniester river. The district contains two cities/towns and 14 communes (a total of 31 localities, including small villages/hamlets):

Grigoriopol

Crasnoe

Maiac

Bîcioc Novovladimirovca Butor India Carmanova Cotovca Fedoseevca Mocearovca Colosova Crasnaia Besarabia Pobeda	Crasnogorca Delacău Crasnaia Gorca Hîrtop Bruslachi Marian Mocreachi Hlinaia, Grigoriopol Mălăiești Cernița Speia	Șipca Vesioloe Tașlîc Teiu Tocmagiu Vinogradnoe

According to the 2004 Census in Transnistria, the population of the sub-district is 48,000, including 31,085 (64.76%) Moldovans, 7,332 (15.28%) Ukrainians, 8,333 (17.36%) Russians, 123 (0.26%) Gagauzians, 240 (0.50%) Bulgarians, 13 (0.03%) Roma, 26 (0.05%) Jews, 100 (0.21%) Poles, 187 (0.39%) Belarusians, 327 (0.68%) Germans, 62 (0.13%) Armenians, and 139 (0.29%) others and non-declared.

== List of heads of the state administration of the Grigoriopol District and the town of Grigoriopol ==
- Yan Viktorovich Vereshchak (? - 11 April 2014)
- Yuriy Valentinovich Larchenko (11 April 2014 - )
