= Vladimir Beșleagă =

Moldovan writer (1931–2025)

Vladimir Beșleagă OR
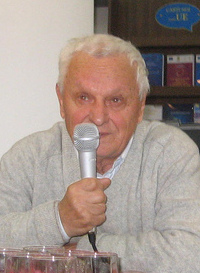
- Beșleagă in 2011

Member of the Moldovan Parliament
- In office 17 April 1990 – 29 March 1994
- Constituency: Hîncești

Personal details
- Born: 25 July 1931 Mălăiești, Moldavian ASSR, Ukrainian SSR, USSR
- Died: 25 February 2025 (aged 93)
- Party: Popular Front of Moldova
- Education: Moldova State University

Vladimir Beșleagă (25 July 1931 – 25 February 2025) was a Moldovan writer and politician.

== Life and career ==
Vladimir Beșleagă was born to Eugenia and Vasile Beșleagă on 25 July 1931 in Mălăiești. Vladimir Beşleagă graduated from Moldova State University in 1955. He served as member of the First Parliament of Moldova. He was a member of the Moldovan Writers' Union from 1965.

Vladimir Beșleagă died on 25 February 2025, at the age of 93. The Moldovan government declared 28 February, the day of his funerals, as a day of mourning

Prime Minister Dorin Recean declared

"With every word, the writer Vladimir Beșleagă taught us to fight – for democracy, for freedom and truth – to fight with courage, despite all the challenges and manipulations. Thoughts

== Awards ==
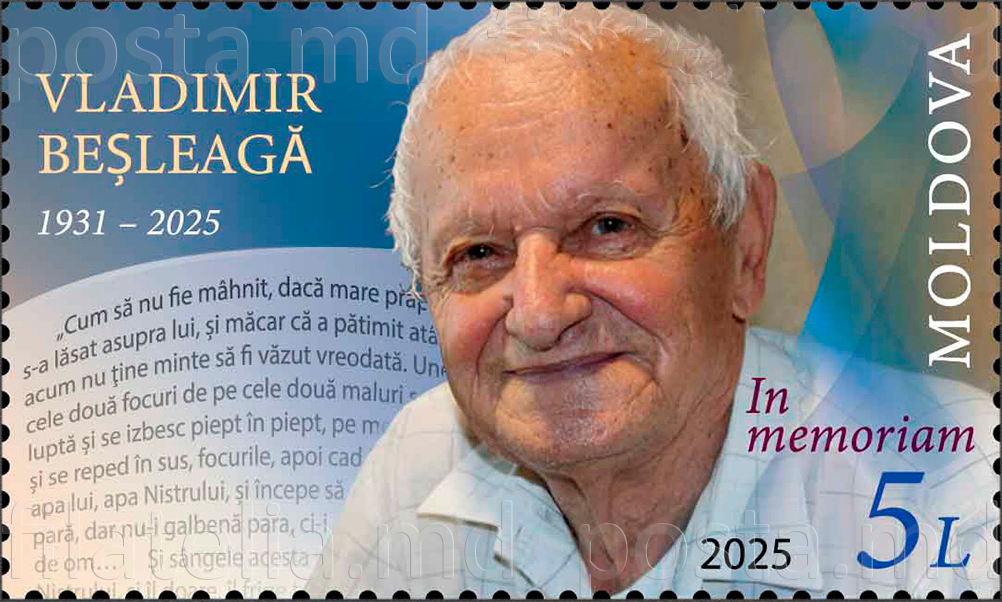
Beșleagă on a 2025 stamp of Moldova

- State Prize of the Moldavian Soviet Socialist Republic (Romanian: Premiul de Stat al RSSM) (1978)
- Honored worker of culture of the Moldavian Soviet Socialist Republic (Romanian: Lucrător emerit al culturii din RSSM) (1981)

== Works ==
- "Zbânţuilă", ed. Școala sovietică, 1956;
- "La fântâna Leahului", ed. Cartea Moldovenească, 1963;
- „Zbor frânt", ed. Cartea Moldovenească, 1966;
- „Vrei să zbori la Lună?", ed. Lumina, 1972;
- „Acasă", ed. Cartea Moldovenească, 1976;
- „Acasă", ed. Literatura Artistică, 1984;
- „Durere", ed. Literatura Artistică, 1979;
- „Boli", ed. Mol.gvardia, 1983;
- „Ignat și Ana", ed. Literatura Artistică, 1979;
- „Suflul vremii", ed. Literatura Artistică, 1981;
- „Sânge pe zăpadă", ed. Literatura Artistică, 1985;
- "Viața și moartea nefericitului Filimon sau Anevoioasa cale a cunoașterii de sine", ed. Hyperion, 1992;
- "Zbor frânt", "Acasă", ed. Literatura Artistică, 1980;
- "Cumplite vremi", partea I, ed. Hyperion, 1990;
- "Zbor frânt", "Pădurea albastră", „Cel de-al treilea dacă ar fi fost acolo”, „Viața și moartea nefericitului Filimon sau Anevoioasa cale a cunoașterii de sine", ed. Hyperion, 1992;
- "Zbor frânt", "Ignat și Ana", ed. Litera, 1997.
- "Nepotul", ed. Litera, 1998;
- "Jurnal 1986–1988", ed. Prut Internaţional, 2002;
- "Cumplite vremi", ed. Litera, 2003;
- "Cruci răsturnate de regim. Mănăstirea Răciula. 1959", Chișinău, 2006;
- "Dialoguri literare", Chișinău, 2006;
- "Hoții din apartamente", Chișinău, 2006;
- "Conștiința națională sub regimul comunist totalitar (RSSM: 1956–1963)", Chișinău, 2008;
- "Dirimaga", ed. Prut Internaţional, 2009.

== Bibliography ==
- Literatura și arta Moldovei: Encicl. – Chișinău, 1985–1986
