= Alexander Moiseyevsky =

Soviet military commander (1902–1971)

- Native name: Александр Гаврилович Моисеевский
- Born: 18 October 1902; Verniy, Semirechye Oblast, Russian Empire
- Died: 18 March 1971 (aged 68) Moscow, Soviet Union
- Buried: Vagankovo Cemetery
- Allegiance: Soviet Union
- Branch: Red Army; Soviet Army
- Service years: 1919–1954
- Rank: Major general
- Commands: 303rd Rifle Division; 312th Rifle Division
- Conflicts: Russian Civil War; Sino-Soviet conflict; World War II
- Awards: Hero of the Soviet Union; Order of Lenin (2); Order of the Red Banner (4); Order of Suvorov, 2nd class; Order of Kutuzov, 2nd class

Alexander Gavrilovich Moiseyevsky (Russian: Александр Гаврилович Моисеевский; 18 October 1902 – 18 March 1971) was a Soviet Army major general and a Hero of the Soviet Union.

Moiseyevsky joined the Red Army in 1919 and fought in the Russian Civil War. Later, he became an officer and political commissar, fighting in the 1929 Sino-Soviet conflict. After the German invasion of the Soviet Union, Moiseyevsky took command of the 303rd Rifle Division in September 1941, leading it in the Yelnya Offensive and the Battle of Moscow, during which it was destroyed in the Spas-Demensk pocket. After reaching Soviet lines and being screened in a NKVD filtration camp, he became deputy commander of the 160th Rifle Division in January 1942. In August, Moiseyevsky took command of the 312th Rifle Division, which he led for the rest of the war. He was awarded the title Hero of the Soviet Union on 6 April 1945 for his division's breakthrough during the Vistula–Oder Offensive. Moiseyevsky retired from the army in 1954 and lived in Moscow, working at the Ministry of Defence.

== Early life and Russian Civil War ==
Moiseyevsky was born on 18 October 1902 in Verniy to a working-class family. His father became a Bolshevik in 1905 and was often in prison. Moiseyevsky later moved to Tomsk, where he graduated from 2nd grade at the Tomsk Gymnasium. He then worked at a candy factory. In 1919, when the 30th Rifle Division entered Tomsk during the Russian Civil War, Moiseyevsky and his father joined the Red Army. Moiseyevsky became a soldier in the 267th Rifle Regiment and was wounded near Krasnoyarsk. Upon recovering he returned to the regiment.

== Interwar period ==
In 1921, Moiseyevsky graduated from several artillery training courses. He graduated from the commanders' refresher courses (KUKS) in 1922. Moiseyevsky became a Communist Party of the Soviet Union member in 1924. In December 1929, while a political commissar in the 21st Artillery Regiment of the 21st Rifle Division, Moiseyevsky fought in the 1929 Sino-Soviet conflict. In a battle south of Manzhouli, he directed his battery in the repulse of a Chinese attack. When the Chinese reached a close range, the battery engaged in hand-to-hand combat. For his actions, Moiseyevsky was awarded the Order of the Red Banner on 4 April 1930. In 1934, he graduated from the Lenin Military-Political Academy. In 1940, Moiseyevsky completed two years of absentee courses at the Frunze Military Academy.

== World War II ==
Moiseyevsky was posted to the Moscow Military District when Germany invaded the Soviet Union in June 1941. At the beginning of September, he was appointed commander of the 303rd Rifle Division, part of the 24th Army. Moiseyevsky led the division during the Yelnya Offensive, after which the division defended its sector. After holding its position for 15 days, the division was encircled after the beginning of Operation Typhoon, the German attack on Moscow, on 5 October. Moiseyevsky and his division were encircled in the Spas-Demensk Pocket, only breaking out in December. After exiting the pocket he was screened in the Abinsky NKVD filtration camp to ensure his loyalty. In January 1942, Moiseyevsky became deputy commander of the 160th Rifle Division.

Moiseyevsky became commander of the 312th Rifle Division in August. The division fought in fierce fighting during the Battles of Rzhev, which lasted until March 1943. Moiseyevsky was awarded a second Order of the Red Banner on 30 March. On 1 September, the division began its advance on Smolensk during the Battle of Smolensk. Moiseyevsky's division broke through along with self-propelled guns and tanks. Soon after, Dorogobuzh was recaptured. On 24 September the 312th crossed the Dnieper and attacked Smolensk from the south. By the next day the town was recaptured. In late 1943 he was promoted to major general. By this time the division had advanced to the Pronya River in the Mogilev Region. On 3 June 1944, he was awarded the Order of Kutuzov, 2nd class.

During the summer of 1944 the division fought in the Lublin–Brest Offensive. On 18 June, the division's 1083rd Rifle Regiment broke through the first German line south of Kovel. Moiseyevsky then advanced the 1081st Regiment through the breach, and the rest of the 69th Army followed. He then committed his division in a 40-kilometer night march in the German rear, crossing the Western Bug. The division captured Dorohusk and then Chełm.The division and the rest of the army advanced to the Vistula, crossing on 4 August. The division participated in heavy fighting in the Puławy bridgehead. Moiseyevsky's division was able to expand the foothold by capturing Kazimierz Dolny. The fighting in the sector lasted until September. On 3 November, Moiseyevsky was awarded his third Order of the Red Banner.

On 14 January 1945, the Vistula–Oder Offensive was launched. The 312th advanced out of the bridgehead 18 kilometers, capturing Policzna. The division reached the Radomka on the third day of the attack. On 29 January the division captured the western part of Poznań. On 6 April Moiseyevsky was awarded the title Hero of the Soviet Union and the Order of Lenin for his leadership. After crossing the Oder, the division fought in the Battle of Berlin as part of the 8th Guards Army. On 30 April, Moiseyevsky was awarded a second Order of Lenin. The division ended the war in the German capital. On 29 May, he received the Order of Suvorov, 2nd class.

== Postwar ==
After the war, Moiseyevsky continued to serve in the Soviet Army. On 15 November 1950, he was awarded a fourth Order of the Red Banner. In 1951, he graduated from the Higher Academic Courses at the Military Academy of the General Staff. He retired in 1954 and lived in Moscow. Moiseyevsky worked for a long period at the Ministry of Defence. He died on 18 March 1971 and was buried in the Vagankovo Cemetery.

== Awards and honors ==
| Hero of the Soviet Union (6 April 1945) |
| Order of Lenin, twice (21 February 1945, 6 April 1945) |
| Order of the Red Banner, four times (4 April 1930, 30 March 1943, 3 November 1944, 15 November 1950) |
| Order of Suvorov, 2nd class (29 May 1945) |
| Order of Kutuzov, 2nd class (3 June 1944) |
| Medal "For the Liberation of Warsaw" (1945) |
| Medal "For the Capture of Berlin" (1945) |
| Medal "For the Victory over Germany in the Great Patriotic War 1941–1945" (1945) |
| Jubilee Medal "Twenty Years of Victory in the Great Patriotic War 1941-1945" (1965) |
| Jubilee Medal "In Commemoration of the 100th Anniversary of the Birth of Vladimir Ilyich Lenin" (1969) |
| Jubilee Medal "XX Years of the Workers' and Peasants' Red Army" (1938) |
| Jubilee Medal "30 Years of the Soviet Army and Navy" (1948) |
| Jubilee Medal "40 Years of the Armed Forces of the USSR" (1958) |
| Jubilee Medal "50 Years of the Armed Forces of the USSR" (1968) |
| Commander of the Virtuti Militari (Poland) |
| Medal "For Oder, Neisse and the Baltic" (Poland) |
