= Boris Marian =

Moldovan writer

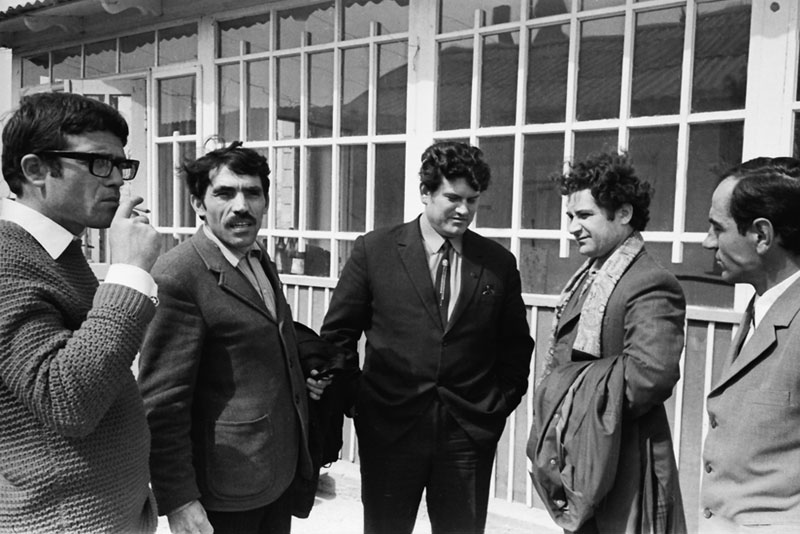
- From left to right: Anatol Ciocanu, Boris Marian and Nicolae Sulac
- Born: 27 September 1934 (age 91); Crasnogorca, Ukrainian SSR, Soviet Union (now Moldova)
- Occupations: Writer, journalist
- Writing career
- Language: Russian, Romanian

Boris Tihonovici Marian (born 27 September 1934; Russian: Борис Тихонович Мариан) is a Moldovan poet, screenwriter, translator, and journalist, as well as a former dissident in the Soviet Union. He primarily writes in Russian and is a member of the Moldovan Writers' Union, the National Writers' Union of Ukraine, and the Union of Writers of Russia.

== Biography ==
Boris Tihonovici Marian was born in a family of Moldovan peasants on 27 September 1934 in Crasnogorca, then in the Moldavian ASSR of the Soviet Union's Ukrainian SSR (now in Moldova, under Transnistrian control). His father, Tihon Marian, was an anti-communist and was arrested several times by Soviet authorities.

=== Anti-communist activities and arrest ===
Marian received pre-university education exclusively in Russian, except for two years in Romanian during the Romanian administration of Transnistria. After graduating high school, he enrolled in the Faculty of Journalism at Kyiv University. In his fourth year, in 1956, amid the revolutionary events in Hungary, he wrote a "program for the democratic renewal of the Union". The main demands included:

- Elimination of privileges for CPSU members.
- Reduction of bureaucracy.
- Reorganization of the Komsomol.
- Increased sovereignty for the union republics.
- Land ownership for peasants (1–3 hectares).
- Worker-controlled factories through elected soviets.
- Reduced taxes for workers and intellectuals by a quarter and for peasants by half.
- The right to organize protests.
- Shortening mandatory military service.
- Judicial independence.
- Jury-based legislative system.
- Publication of evidence regarding Stalinist atrocities.
- Elimination of censorship.
- Freedom of the press and its right to criticize the government.
- Allowing all ideologies except ultranationalist and Nazi ones.
- Access to foreign literature and journals.
- Promotion of peace by the USSR internationally.
- Right to organize strikes.
- Free international travel.
- University autonomy.
- Scholarships allowing students a decent living.

Marian shared the document with several colleagues, one of whom reported it to the university authorities. When questioned, he placed the document on the table and declared his intention to send it to the Central Committee of the Communist Party of the Soviet Union. After reading the program, Aleksey Kirichenko, First Secretary of the Communist Party of Ukraine, instructed the KGB to investigate Marian. On 4 January 1957, he was expelled and subsequently arrested on charges of counter-revolutionary and anti-socialist activities. Despite advocating for the reform of the communist system rather than its overthrow, he was sentenced on 25 April 1957 to five years of forced labor in Mordovia, in the Russian SFSR. During his imprisonment, he participated in a strike and formed friendships with Ukrainian prisoners. He was released in 1962.

=== Life after release ===
Following his release, Marian studied at the Maxim Gorky Literature Institute and was employed by the magazine Cultura Moldovei. He later claimed that he had been helped by Andrei Lupan and Petrea Cruceniuc to get employed. He later worked as a screenwriter at Moldova-Film and published several poetry collections. In 1990, he was rehabilitated. He became involved in Moldova's independence movement from the Soviet Union and worked as a journalist at Moldova Suverană until 2009.

=== Political views and opinions ===
Marian is a critic of the pro-Romanian intellectual elite in Moldova. In 2011, he criticized Chișinău mayor Dorin Chirtoacă and the pro-European government, claiming that "it is worse than under the Romanians – at least they did not pretend to be democrats". Although he admires Romanian culture and has translated works by Mihai Eminescu, Vasile Alecsandri, and George Coșbuc into Russian, Marian opposes the unification of Moldova and Romania. He believes Moldova should remain an independent, multinational state.

He has clashed repeatedly with the leadership of the Writers' Union of Moldova, especially with Nicolae Dabija, whom he labeled a Russophobe, due to their pro-Romanian position, accusing them of hypocrisy. Marian claims that while he was imprisoned in the Gulag, they were praising the Soviet regime. He also argues that the Tsarist annexation of Bessarabia in 1812 saved the Moldovan people from the Ottoman Empire.

In an article on Ava.md, Marian asserted that while "Moldovan" and Romanian are the same language, he prefers the term "Moldovan" to emphasize Moldova's independence achieved in 1991. He advocates for replacing the "History of the Romanians" curriculum with "History of Moldova" and likens Moldova–Romania relations to those between Austria and Germany, Mexico and Spain, or Canada and the United States, though he believes constructive relations are impossible while Romania seeks "Anschluss".

Marian supported the 2014 Gagauz referendum and argued against Moldova's integration into the European Union, which he considers a "new Soviet Union," and against the "Romanianization" of Moldova, warning against a "Moldovan Maidan".

Since the 2014 Euromaidan and Ukrainian revolution, which he opposed, Marian has not visited Ukraine. In a 2024 interview with the Russian site Literaturnaya Gazeta, on the occasion of his 90th birthday, he explained that his relations with Ukrainian writers had worsened because of Maidan.
