= Bîcioc =

Bîcioc Бычок (Russian) Бичок (Ukrainian)
- Commune
- Location within Moldova
- Coordinates: 46°55′27″N 29°28′50″E
- Country (de jure): Moldova
- Country (de facto): Transnistria (Note: Transnistria's political status is disputed. It considers itself to be an independent state, but this is not recognised by any UN member state. The Moldovan government and the international community consider Transnistria a part of Moldova's territory.)
- Elevation: 22 m (72 ft)
- Time zone: UTC+2 (EET)
  - Summer (DST): UTC+3 (EEST)

Bîcioc (Moldovan Cyrillic and Russian: Бычок, romanized: Bychok, Ukrainian: Бичок, romanized: Bychok) is a commune in the Grigoriopol District of Transnistria, Moldova. It is composed of two villages, Bîcioc and Novovladimirovca (Нововладимировка). It is currently under the administration of the breakaway government of the Transnistrian Moldovan Republic. According to the 2004 census, the population of the village was 1,422 inhabitants, of which 173 (12.16%) were Moldovans (Romanians), 187 (13.15%) Ukrainians and 997 (70.11%) Russians.
