= Dărăști-Ilfov =

- Commune
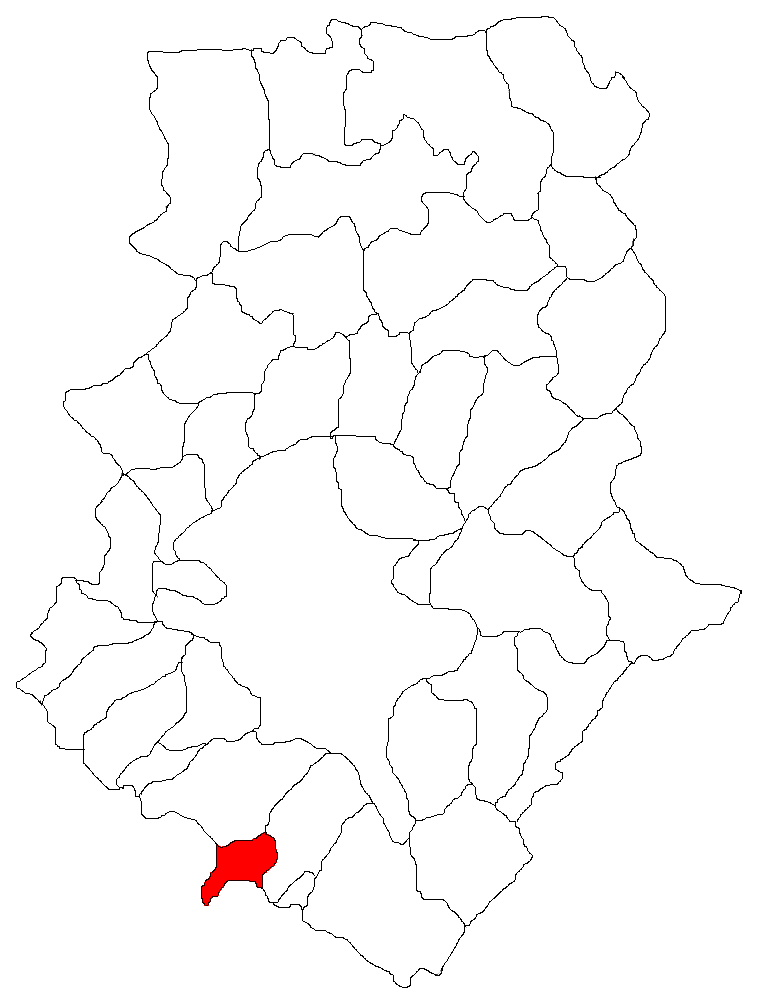
- Location in Ilfov County

- Location in Romania
- Coordinates: 44°19′N 26°1′E
- Country: Romania
- County: Ilfov

Government
  - Mayor (2024–2028): Ștefan Iancu (PSD)
- Area: 15.13 km^{2} (5.84 sq mi)
- Elevation: 68 m (223 ft)
- Population (2021-12-01): 2,865
  - Density: 189.4/km^{2} (490.4/sq mi)
- Time zone: UTC+02:00 (EET)
  - Summer (DST): UTC+03:00 (EEST)
- Postal code: 077080
- Area code: +(40) 21
- Vehicle reg.: IF
- Website: comunadarastiilfov.ro

Dărăști-Ilfov is a commune in the south of Ilfov County, Muntenia, Romania, 20 km (12 mi) from the national capital, Bucharest. It is composed of a single village, Dărăști-Ilfov. The commune, with a population of 2,865 people as of 2021, is mainly inhabited by low-income families, many of which commute to Bucharest for work but live in the locality due to cheaper housing.

== Transport ==
Until July 2005, Dărăști had been served by public bus route 433 from Bucharest, run by RATB, the capital's bus operator. After July 2005, however, RATB suspended all of its outer-suburban routes in Ilfov County, including Route 433 to Dărăști, citing lack of profitability on these routes. This resulted in the routes being licensed out to private operators. The Dărăști-Bucharest route was contracted to Atlassib, a Romanian bus company which operates internationally. Atlassib has been accused by the residents of Dărăști for doubling prices, despite the fact that RATB prices were heavily subsidised.

In October 2005, this led to a number of revolts by the residents of the Dărăști, many of which refused to pay the fare, physically-abused drivers and controllers, and damaged the buses, causing losses of 200,000 lei to Altassib. This has led to the introduction of security guards on Dărăști services, and in bus stops alongside the route, making the Dărăști–Bucharest route the only route in Romania that necessitates this type of security. On October 10, 2005, Gândul reported that the threats and assault against Atlassib employees increased, prompted by a price rise of more than 30% that Altassib maintains was only caused by a need to recover losses on the route. This had led many to believe that the bus service may soon by totally suspended, leaving the locality without any public transport links with Bucharest and further exacerbating Dărăști's social problems.

In 2006, RATB reintroduced Route 433 services from Bucharest to Dărăști, and the locality is now once again connected to the capital's public bus network.

Historical population
Year	Pop.	±%
2002	2,935	—
2011	3,026	+3.1%
2021	2,865	−5.3%
Source: Census data
