= Dubienka =

- Village
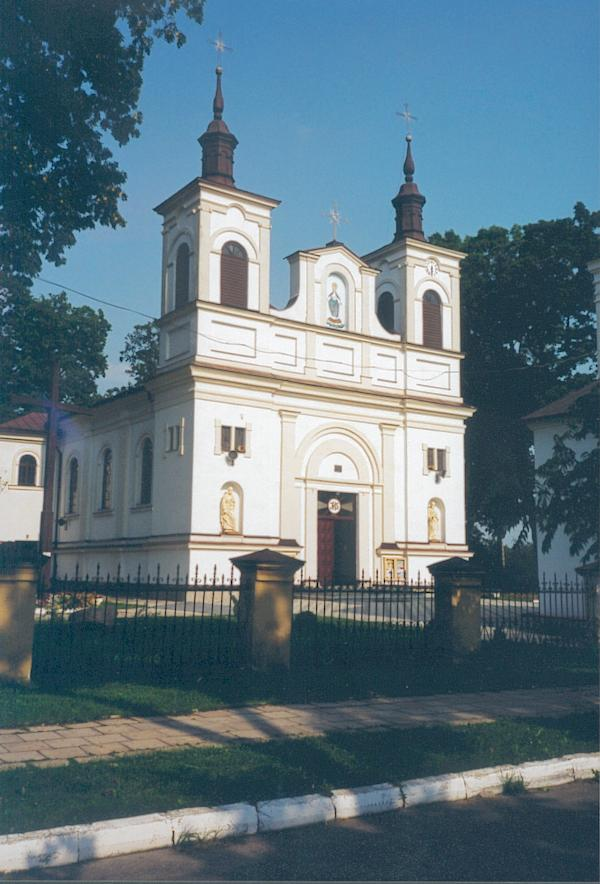
- Trinity Catholic Church

- Coat of arms

- Location within Poland
- Coordinates: 51°3′N 23°53′E
- Country: Poland
- Voivodeship: Lublin
- County: Chełm
- Gmina: Dubienka

Population
  - Total: 1,042
- Website: dubienka.lubelskie.pl

Dubienka [duˈbʲɛŋka] is a village in Chełm County, Lublin Voivodeship, in eastern Poland, close to the border with Ukraine on the Bug River. It is the seat of the gmina (administrative district) called Gmina Dubienka.

== History ==
In 1792, a battle between Polish and Russian armies took place nearby.

The town was occupied by the Germans during World War II from 1939 to 1944. The Jewish population consisted of around 2,500 individuals.

In May 1942, the Germans reported that there were 2,907 Jews in Dubienka, some of whom had been transported there from neighboring villages.

On 22 May 1942, the Germans conducted an Aktion in which they murdered a number of Jews at the local Jewish cemetery.

On 2 June 1942, local farmers, under German orders, took Jews by horse and wagon to Hrubieszow where they were held for two days with little food and water, then put on freight trains and taken to the Sobibór extermination camp where they were immediately murdered. Two to three hundred were left behind as laborers. Only about fifteen Dubienka Jews survived the Holocaust. The Jewish community ceased to exist.

At the intersection of 3 Maja and Cerkiewna streets, there is Orthodox Church of the Holy Trinity. The building was closed for religious purposes in 1945 and served as a warehouse for several decades. Some of its furnishings were transferred to the newly established Church of Saints Peter and Paul in Słupsk, while other elements were looted, and the frescoes inside were damaged. Renovation work began only after 1990, and in the early 21st century, the church was returned to the Polish Orthodox Church. However, it remains closed due to its poor technical condition.
