= 312th Rifle Division =

312th Rifle Division (July 10, 1941 – December 27, 1941) 312th Rifle Division (December 25, 1941 – May 29, 1945)
- Active: 1941–1945
- Country: Soviet Union
- Branch: Red Army
- Type: Infantry
- Size: Division
- Engagements: Siege of Leningrad; Battle of Moscow; Battles of Rzhev; Battle of Smolensk (1943); Operation Bagration; Vistula-Oder Offensive; Berlin Strategic Offensive
- Decorations: Order of the Red Banner 2nd Formation; Order of Suvorov 2nd Formation; Order of Kutuzov 2nd Formation
- Battle honours: Smolensk

Commanders
- Notable commanders: Col. Aleksandr Fyodorovich Naumov; Col. Aleksandr Ivanovich Golovanov; Maj. Gen. Aleksandr Gavrilovich Moiseyevsky

The 312th Rifle Division was a Red Army infantry division formed for the first time on July 10, 1941 in Kazakhstan before being sent to the vicinity of Leningrad, where it fought briefly before being redeployed to the front southwest of Moscow in late October, where it suffered huge losses in the wake of Operation Typhoon, and was disbanded not long after. A new 312th began forming in December in Siberia, and this second formation served again in front of Moscow, in the fighting in the area of Rzhev and Sychevka during 1942 and into 1943. In the latter year, the division distinguished itself in the liberation of Smolensk and received that city's name as an honorific. As the war concluded, the men and women of the 312th gained additional honors, and ended the war fighting near Berlin. The division was disbanded shortly after the end of the conflict.

== 1st Formation ==
The 312th began forming on July 10, 1941, at Akyubinsk in the Central Asia Military District, based on the first wartime shtat (table of organization and equipment) for rifle divisions. The personnel of the division were mostly Kazakhs at this time. Its order of battle was:

- 1079th Rifle Regiment
- 1081st Rifle Regiment
- 1083rd Rifle Regiment
- 859th Artillery Regiment
- 375th Antitank Battalion
- 591st Antiaircraft Battalion
- 205th Reconnaissance Battalion
- 599th Sapper Battalion
- 764th Signal Battalion
- 244th Medical Battalion
- 294th Motor Transport Company
- 447th Field Bakery
- 991st Field Postal Station

Col. Aleksandr Fyodorovich Naumov was in command of the first formation of 312th for its entire existence. Col. Kornei Mikhailovich Andrusenko was given command of the 1081st Rifle Division in late July, a post he would hold until transferred on October 17. The division was given about six weeks to form up before it was sent by rail all the way to the Northwestern Front, ending its journey in the Tikhvin area east of Leningrad. It was first assigned to the 52nd Army as that Army was forming up in August as a separate army under STAVKA control. During September the 312th helped to contest the German advance towards Leningrad, but as the German Typhoon offensive developed west of Moscow, the division got orders to redeploy by rail from Valdai towards the capital, beginning on October 6. Due to the chaos of the time this redeployment went in a piecemeal fashion, and the division's rifle regiments were sent into combat right off the trains, into the forces of the Maloyaroslavets Defense Sector, which became the 43rd Army, in Western Front, by October 12. Fighting piecemeal against armored forces was a deadly business; by October 18 the 859th Artillery Regiment was manning the lines at Maloyaroslavets with 34 artillery pieces, but the rifle regiments had taken very heavy losses in less than a week and were no longer combat-effective. By the end of the month the division was effectively destroyed, and the remnants were distributed to other units in the Western Front. On December 27, the number "312" was officially made available for a new division.

== 2nd Formation ==
A new rifle division began forming at Altaisk in the Siberian Military District on December 25, 1941, originally numbered as the 450th and based on the second wartime shtat for rifle divisions. Accordingly its order of battle was changed:

- 591st Antiaircraft Battalion was not reformed
- 205th Reconnaissance Battalion was reformed as a company
- 764th Signal Battalion was reformed as 437th Signal Company
- 397th Chemical Protection Company was added
- Motor Transport Company was re-designated as the 387th
- Field Bakery was re-designated as the 437th
- Field Postal Station was re-designated as the 1697th
- 902nd Divisional Veterinary Infirmary and 1067th field ticket office of the State Bank were added.

Col. Aleksandr Ivanovich Golovanov was assigned as commander. In January, 1942, this division became the second formation of the 312th. It acquired the same order of battle as the first formation. When the division was fully formed in April it had 12,299 officers and men assigned, and 56.6 percent of them were under 25 years of age. On the one hand, the division had a large percentage of young, presumably fit soldiers. On the other hand, none of these young men are likely to have had any military experience or much training before they joined the division. In late April the 312th moved west to the Moscow Military District, and the following month was assigned first to the 2nd Reserve, then to the 4th Reserve Army in the Reserve of the Supreme High Command. In July it went to Western Front, assigned to 20th Army, where it saw its first combat during the First Rzhev–Sychyovka Offensive Operation.

On August 11, 1942, the division came under the command of Colonel (Major General as of October 16, 1943) Aleksandr Moiseyevsky, who had previously commanded the 303rd Rifle Division. Moiseyevsky would remain in command of the 312th for the duration of the war. During the Second Rzhev-Sychevka Offensive Operation the division was in the 29th Army which was supporting 20th Army's left flank with limited attacks. In March, 1943, the division was transferred again, now to 5th Army, still in Western Front.

=== Battle of Smolensk ===
During the second phase of Operation Suvorov 5th Army joined the offensive on August 31, attacking the left flank of the German XII Army Corps with five rifle divisions supported by tanks and advancing 13 km in a single day. This made it pointless to mount a defense of Dorogobuzh, and the 312th entered the empty town on September 1. On September 25, still serving in 5th Army, the 312th was granted the honorific "Smolensk" for its role in the liberation of that city:

"SMOLENSK" - 312th Rifle Division (Colonel Moiseyevsky, Aleksandr Gavrilovich)... The troops who participated in the battles of Smolensk and Roslavl, by the order of the Supreme High Command of September 25, 1943, and a commendation in Moscow, are given a salute of 20 artillery salvoes from 224 guns.

Following this triumph, 5th Army was ordered to continue its advance westward along the road to Orsha. The 312th and 207th Rifle Divisions led this advance (the Army had only three divisions and a fortified region at this time) on October 2. After crossing the Malaia Berezina River between the villages of Danki and Privole, the two divisions encountered the defenses of the German 52nd and 197th Infantry Divisions of XXVII Army Corps. The 52nd, in particular, had been badly weakened in previous fighting. By the end of October 3 the Soviet divisions had captured two more villages and driven a wedge into the 52nd's defensive front. The history of 5th Army states:

"The surprise attack demoralized the Hitlerites, and by morning they began to withdraw in disorder."

By the evening of the next day the 312th and 207th had driven a gap 10 km wide and 6 km deep, unhinging the entire German defense of the Malaia Berezina. On October 8 they were joined by the 208th Rifle Division and continued the advance, occupying the road hub and strong point of Lyubavichi and reaching the main stream of the Berezina, which forced further German withdrawals. The next day the advance hit the right flank of the 256th Infantry Division south of Liozna. By midday on October 11 the 312th reached the Chernitsa River, and had almost reached Babinovichi. At this point the advance came to a halt, in part because the Soviet armies on 5th Army's flanks had not been as successful.

On October 12, Western Front tried to renew the drives of those less successful armies, and 5th Army was tasked to protect the right flank of 31st Army over the coming days. From October 16–20 the Front carried out a major regrouping as directed by the STAVKA. The 312th and the other divisions of 5th Army were transferred to 31st Army while 5th Army headquarters moved to the rear. The division was soon subordinated to the 7th Guards Rifle Corps in the 10th Guards Army. This Army was transferred to the 2nd Baltic Front in December.

== Advance ==
In March, 1944, the 312th went into the Reserve of the Supreme High Command, where it was assigned to the 69th Army. The following month that Army went to the front in the 1st Belorussian Front. The division served the entire last year of the war in Europe, from April, 1944 to May, 1945, in the 91st Rifle Corps under those Army and Front commands. During the first phase of the Soviet summer offensive, the 69th was part of the western grouping of its Front, in the vicinity of Kovel, and played little role in the initial fighting.

This changed with the start of the Brest - Siedlce Offensive Operation on July 18. The 69th, along with the 8th Guards and 47th Armies, formed the shock groups for this assault, which began at 0530 hours following a 30-minute artillery preparation. It was soon determined that most of the enemy had already withdrawn to his next defense line, and the first and some of the second trench lines were carried in the first 90 minutes. That second defense line along the Vyzhuvka River was soon reached and even breached in the Khvorostuv area. This advance was so rapid that the German forces continued retreating to their next line along the Western Bug. By the end of July 20, 69th Army had reached as far as the eastern outskirts of Dubienka after an advance of 8 – 12 km that day. The following day, for political reasons, 69th and 8th Guards Armies were redirected towards Lublin, which was liberated by 8th Guards on July 23. On August 9 the 312th was awarded the Order of the Red Banner for its role in the liberation of Kovel.

At the start of the Vistula-Oder Offensive, 69th Army was in the second echelon of its Front's grouping in the Pulawy bridgehead, which exploited the breakthrough along with mobile forces in the general direction of Radom, and then towards Lodz. Radom was captured on January 16. On January 26, 69th Army was given orders to continue the offensive and force the line of the Oder River near Frankfurt.

On April 6, 1945, for exemplary performance of his command assignments at the front and for displaying courage and heroism, Maj. Gen. Moiseyevsky was made a Hero of the Soviet Union:

"On the night of August 4, 1944... showing personal initiative, secretly crossed the Vistula south-west of the town of Kazimierz Dolny (Poland) and seized a bridgehead. During the fighting this was not only held but expanded... On January 14, 1945, the forces of the division, acting on the direction of the main attack, captured the second line of the enemy defenses 10 km north of Zwoleń, Poland, by the end of the day. On January 29 the division captured the western sector of the city of Poznań.

At the end of the war, the official title of the division was 312th Rifle, Smolensk, Order of the Red Banner, Order of Suvorov, Order of Kutuzov Division. (Russian: 312-я стрелковая Смоленская Краснознамённая орденов Суворова и Кутузова дивизия.)

== Postwar ==
According to STAVKA Order No. 11095 of May 29, 1945, part 6, the 312th is listed as one of the rifle divisions to be "disbanded in place". It was disbanded in Germany in accordance with the directive during the summer of 1945.
