= 160th Rifle Division =

The 160th Rifle Division of the Soviet Union's Red Army may refer to:

- 160th Rifle Division (1940 formation)
- 160th Rifle Division (1941 formation)

== See also ==
- 160th Division (disambiguation)
