= Moldovan Cyrillic alphabet =

One of the writing systems for the Romanian language in Moldova

Moldovan Cyrillic
- Script type: Alphabet
- Period: 1924–1932, 1938–present
- Languages: Romanian in the Moldavian SSR and other parts of the former Soviet Union (known there as Moldovan)

Related scripts
- Parent systems: Phoenician alphabet: Greek alphabet; Glagolitic script; Cyrillic script; Moldovan Cyrillic
- Sister systems: Romanian Cyrillic alphabet

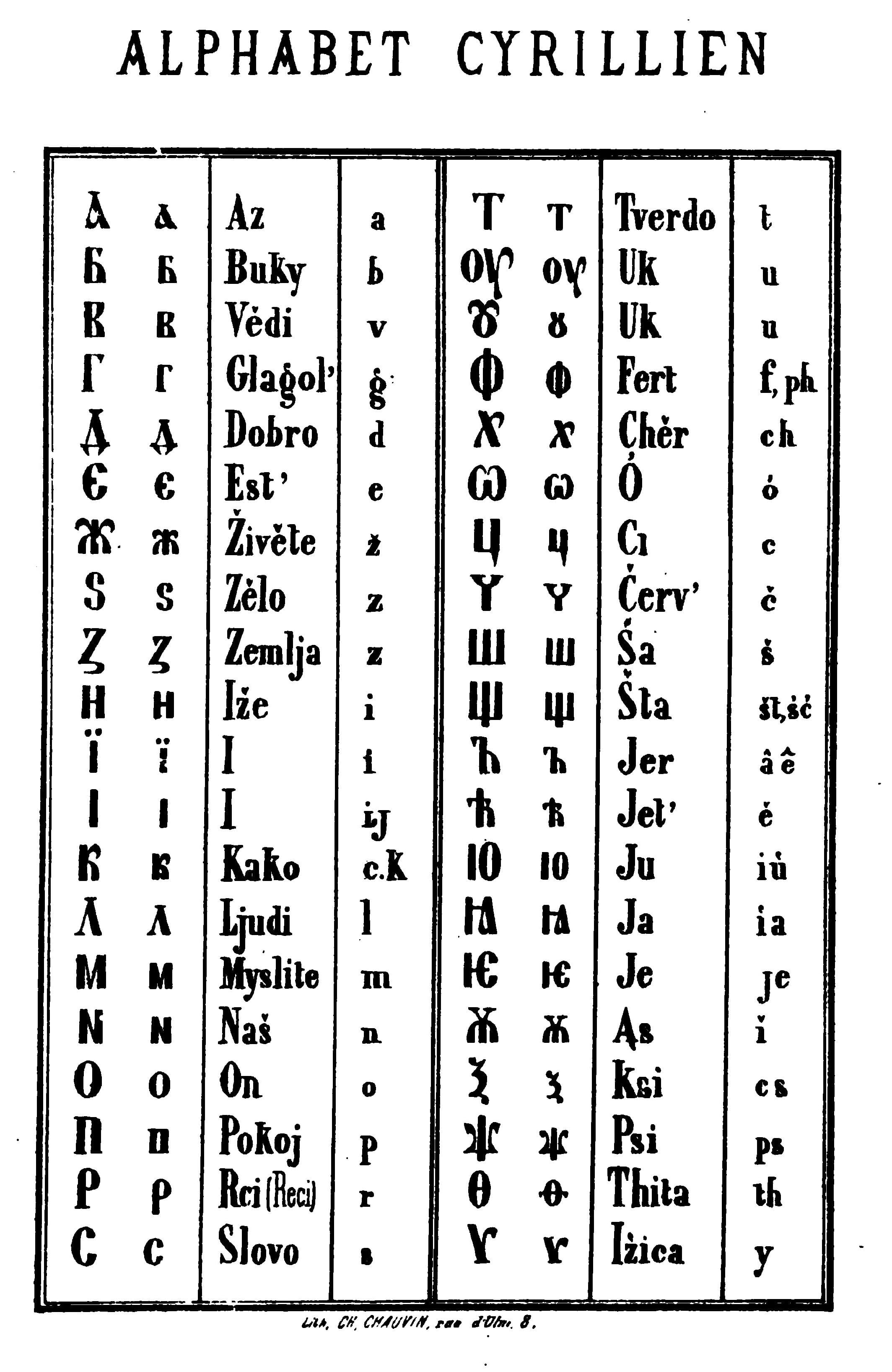
A mid-19th century version of a Romanian Cyrillic alphabet, featuring characters that are not in the modern alphabet

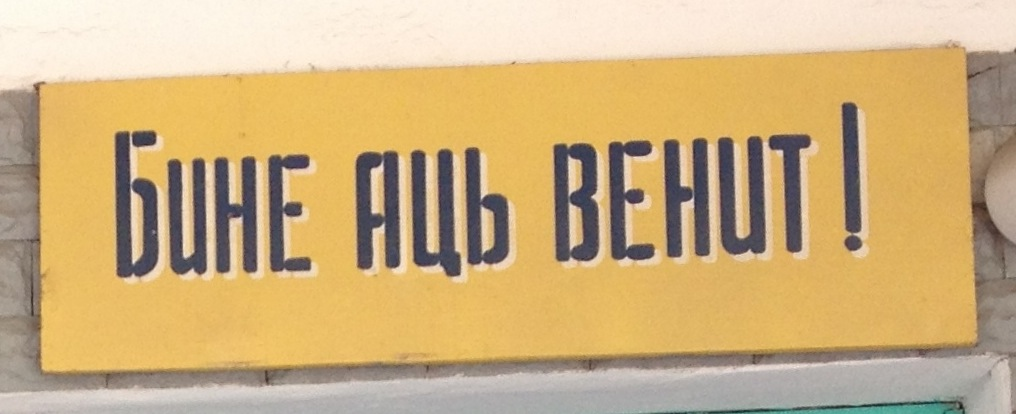
Welcome (Bine ați venit!) sign in Moldovan Cyrillic in Tiraspol, the capital of Transnistria, in 2012

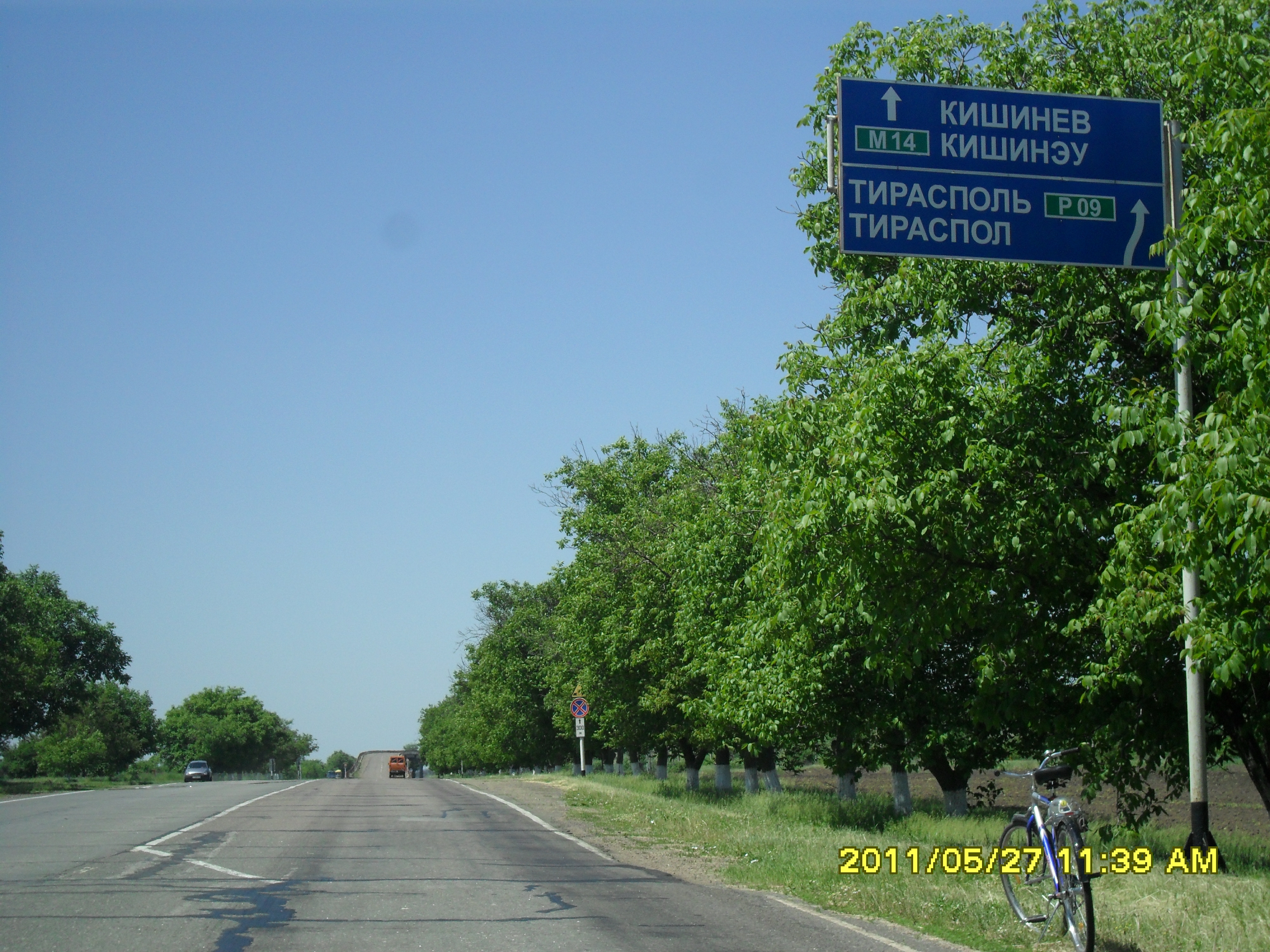
Road sign in Transnistria showing differences between Russian and Moldovan Cyrillic spellings, respectively, for Chișinău and Tiraspol

The Moldovan Cyrillic alphabet is a Cyrillic alphabet designed for the Romanian language spoken in the Soviet Union and was in official use from 1924 to 1932 and 1938 to 1989. It is still in use today in the breakaway Moldovan region of Transnistria.

== History ==
From the 12th to the 19th century, Romanian was usually written using a local variant of the Cyrillic alphabet. The earliest extant Romanian text is a 1521 letter written in such an alphabet.

A variant based on the reformed Russian civil script was first introduced in the late 18th century, and became widespread in Bessarabia after its annexation to the Russian Empire. The rest of the Principality of Moldavia gradually switched to a Latin-based alphabet, adopted officially after its union with Wallachia that resulted in the creation of Romania. Grammars and dictionaries published in Bessarabia before 1917, both those that used the label "Moldovan" and the few that used "Romanian", used a version of the Cyrillic alphabet, with its use continuing in Bessarabia even after the 1918 union, in order to make the publications more accessible to peasant readers.

The Moldovan Cyrillic alphabet was officially introduced in the early 1920s, as part of the Soviet bid to standardise the orthography of Romanian in the Moldavian ASSR. This also further Soviet political objectives by marking a clear distinction from the Latin-based Romanian orthography introduced in Romania in the 1860s. As was the case with other Cyrillic-based languages in the Soviet Union, such as Russian, Ukrainian or Belarusian, obsolete and redundant characters were dropped in an effort to simplify the orthography and boost literacy.

Cyrillic was briefly abandoned for a Latin-based Moldovan alphabet (in the Moldovan version of the alphabet, compared to the Romanian version, the letter Â â was missing) during the Union-wide Latinisation campaign in 1932. Cyrillic returned to the official orthography for Moldovan through a 1938 declaration by the Central Executive Committee of the Moldavian Autonomous Soviet Socialist Republic, now with an orthography more similar to standard Russian. Following the Soviet occupation of Bessarabia and Northern Bukovina, it was established as the official alphabet of the Moldavian Soviet Socialist Republic until 1989, when a law returned to the standard, Latin-based, Romanian alphabet.

There were several requests to switch back to the Latin alphabet, which was seen "more suitable for the Romance core of the language", in the Moldavian SSR. In 1965, the demands of the 3rd Congress of Writers of Soviet Moldavia were rejected by the leadership of the Communist Party, the replacement being deemed "contrary to the interests of the Moldavian people and not reflecting its aspirations and hopes". When the Republic of Moldova declared independence from the Soviet Union in 1991, it returned to a Latin script as the official orthography for the Moldovan language. However, the breakaway Transnistra region has retained the Moldovan Cyrillic alphabet as their official alphabet.

Moldovan Cyrillic spellings are still used in the media and in governmental publications in the Republic of Moldova for the names of settlements when writing in Russian, as opposed to using their Russian forms (e.g. Кишинэу is used in place of Кишинёв for the name of the city of Chișinău).

== Description ==
All but one of the letters of this alphabet can be found in the modern Russian alphabet, with the exception being the zhe with breve: Ӂ ӂ (U+04C1, U+04C2). The Russian letters Ё, Щ, and Ъ are absent from the Moldovan Cyrillic alphabet, and the former two are usually substituted with corresponding clusters ЬО and ШТ respectively.

The following chart shows the Moldovan Cyrillic alphabet compared with the Romanian Latin alphabet currently in use. IPA values are given for the post-1957 literary standard.

Cyrillic letter:	Equates to Latin letter:	Name	As employed in this context:	IPA	Example
А а	a	а (a)		/a/	apă = апэ
Б б	b	бе (be)		/b/	burtă = буртэ
В в	v	ве (ve)		/v/	verde = верде
Г г	g, gh	ге (ghe)	gh used before i or e, elsewhere g	/ɡ/	gheață = гяцэ, gât = гыт
Д д	d	де (de)		/d/	dinte = динте
Е е	e, ie	е (e), ье (ie)	ie after a vowel or if it alternates with ia, elsewhere e	/e/, /je/, /ʲe/	muiere = муере, pietre = пьетре
Ж ж	j	же (je)		/ʒ/	a înjunghia = а ынжунгия
Ӂ ӂ	g, ge, gi	ӂе (ge)	g before i and e, ge before a, gi elsewhere	/dʒ/	fulgerele = фулӂереле
З з	z	зе (ze)		/z/	ziua = зиуа
И и	i, ii	и (i)	ii used at end of word, i elsewhere	/i/	codrii = кодрий
Й й	i	и скурт (i scurt)	before and after vowels	/j/	maioneză = майонезэ, carte de căpătâi = карте де кэпэтый
К к	c, ch	ка (ca)	ch before i and e, c elsewhere	/k/	chirilice = кириличе, câine = кыне
Л л	l	ле (le)		/l/	limba = лимба
М м	m	ме (me)		/m/	moldovenească = молдовеняскэ
Н н	n	не (ne)		/n/	sânge = сынӂе
О о	o	о (o)		/o/	ou = оу
П п	p	пе (pe)		/p/	pană = панэ
Р р	r	ре (re)		/r/	roșu = рошу
С с	s	се (se)		/s/	soare = соаре
Т т	t	те (te)		/t/	vânt = вынт
У у	u	у (u)		/u/	unu = уну
Ф ф	f	фе (fe)		/f/	frunză = фрунзэ
Х х	h	ха (ha)		/h/	harță = харцэ
Ц ц	ț	це (țe)		/ts/	ține = цине
Ч ч	c, ce, ci	че (ce)	c before i and e, ce before a, ci elsewhere	/tʃ/	ce = че
Ш ш	ș	ше (șe)		/ʃ/	și = ши
Ы ы	â, î	ы (î)	â and î	/ɨ/	română = ромынэ, înțelegere = ынцелеӂере
Ь ь	i	семнул моале (semnul moale)	At end of word (usually)	/ʲ/ (i.e. palatalization of preceding consonant)	ochi = окь
Э э	ă	э (ă)		/ə/	mână = мынэ
Ю ю	iu	ю (iu)		/ju/, /ʲu/	iulie = юлие
Я я	ea, ia	я (ia)	ea after a consonant or е, ia elsewhere	/ja/, /ʲa/	ceață = чяцэ, piatră = пятрэ

== Sample text ==
This text is from Mihai Eminescu's Luceafărul.

Latin script

Privea în zare cum pe mări
Răsare și străluce,
Pe mișcătoarele cărări
Corăbii negre duce.

Moldovan Cyrillic script

Привя ын заре кум пе мэрь
Рэсаре ши стрэлуче,
Пе мишкэтоареле кэрэрь
Корэбий негре дуче.

== See also ==
- Romanian alphabet
- Romanian Cyrillic alphabet
- Romanian transitional alphabet
- Ӂ
