= 58th Guards Rifle Division =

58th Guards Rifle Division; 1st Rifle Division (before 31 December 1942)
- Active: June 1942 – June 1946
- Country: Soviet Union
- Branch: Red Army / Soviet Army
- Type: Infantry
- Engagements: World War II; Operation Little Saturn; Third Battle of Kharkov; Belgorod–Kharkov Offensive; Battle of the Dnieper; Dnieper–Carpathian Offensive; Lvov–Sandomierz Offensive; Sandomierz–Silesian Offensive; Lower Silesian Offensive; Upper Silesian Offensive; Berlin Offensive; Prague Offensive
- Decorations: Order of Lenin; Order of the Red Banner; Order of Suvorov
- Honorifics: Krasnograd; Prague

Commanders
- Notable commanders: Vladimir Rusakov

The 58th Guards Rifle Division (Russian: 58-я гвардейская стрелковая дивизия) was an elite Guards infantry division of the Red Army during World War II.

It was formed in June 1942 as the 1st Rifle Division (1st formation) (Note: The 1st Rifle Division formed in 1942 was officially referred to as the 1st Rifle Division (1st formation) by the official list of Red Army units compiled postwar because it was the first of two unrelated units designated the 1st Rifle Division formed between 1941 and 1945, although it was not the first unit of the Red Army designated the 1st Rifle Division.) and was converted into the 58th Guards Rifle Division at the end of the year for its actions in Operation Little Saturn. Advancing into Ukraine, the division participated in the Third Battle of Kharkov in early 1943. From midyear it fought in the Belgorod–Kharkov Offensive, the Battle of the Dnieper, and the Dnieper–Carpathian Offensive, receiving the honorific Krasnograd for its capture of that city and the Order of the Red Banner. After capturing the Sandomierz bridgehead at the end of the Lvov–Sandomierz Offensive, the division fought in the Sandomierz–Silesian Offensive in January 1945, receiving the Order of Suvorov for its crossing of the Oder. It was the first to meet American forces on the Elbe during the Berlin Offensive on 25 April 1945, receiving the Order of Lenin.

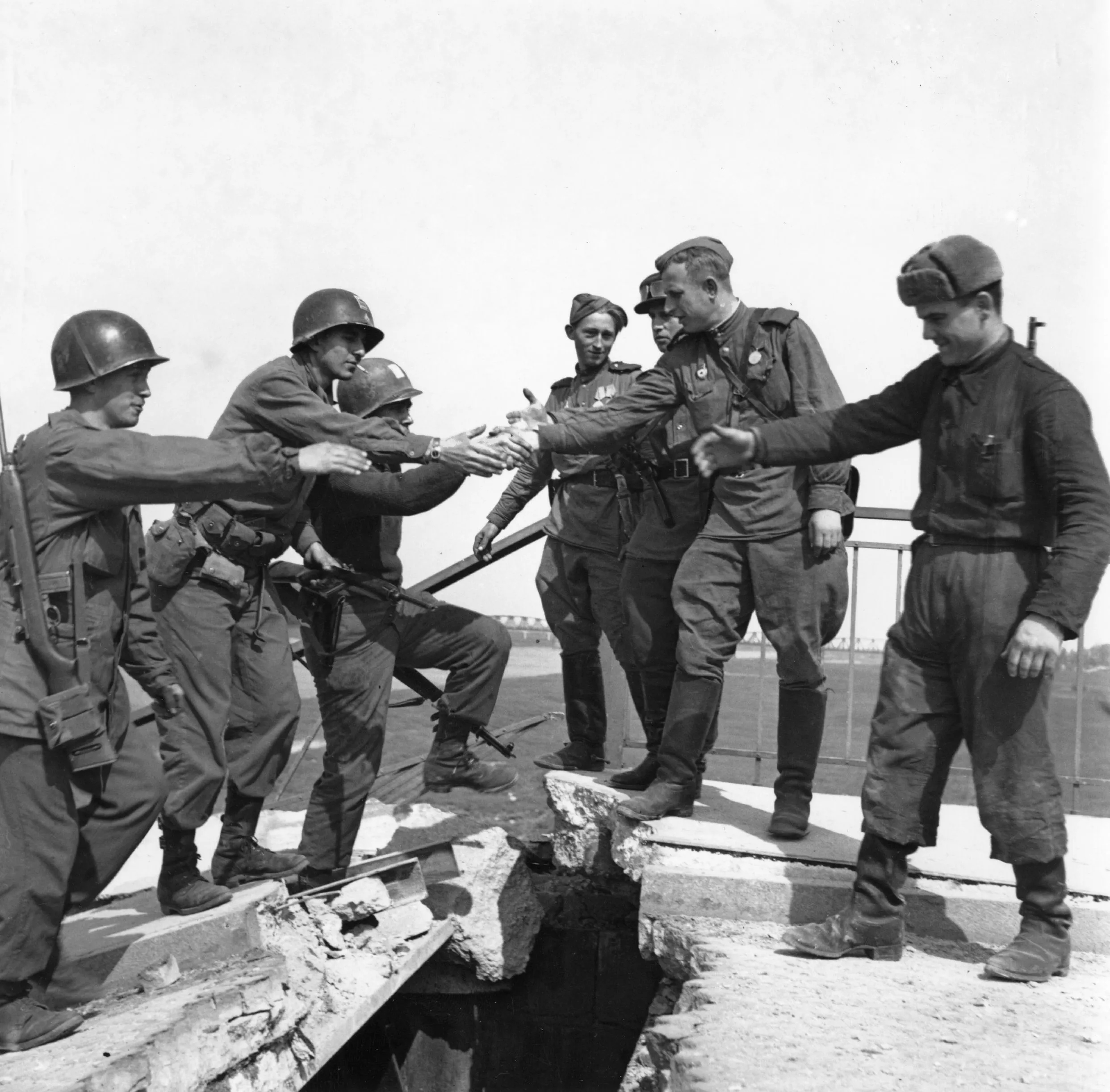
Soviet Lt. Charles Thau of the 58th Guards Rifle Division (center, looking into camera) behind the handshake, at the Elbe with U.S. 69th Infantry PFC Bernard E. Kirschenbaum (left center tallest figure), 25 April 1945

For its actions in the Prague Offensive at the end of the war, the division was awarded the name of Prague as an honorific. It was disbanded a little more than a year after the end of the war.

== Formation and Stalingrad ==
The 1st Rifle Division (1st formation) was formed between 3 March and 22 June 1942 in the city of Melekess, Kuybyshev Oblast, part of the Volga Military District. The division was formed in accordance with shtat (table of organization and equipment) 04/200 from personnel of the disbanded 9th Sapper Army, conscripts from Kuybyshev Oblast, convalescents from hospitals, and freed prisoners from forced labor camps. It included the 408th, 412th, and 415th Rifle Regiments, the 1026th Artillery Regiment, and smaller units. The 1st was quickly assigned to the 5th Reserve Army (which became the 63rd Army on 10 July and the 1st Guards Army (Second formation) in November) on 9 June at the village of Aleksikovo, where it was reorganized in accordance with shtat 04/300 due to being understrength in equipment and transport.

The division took up defensive positions on the left bank of the Don River along the line of Novaya Kalitva, Verkhny Mamon, and Sukhoy Donets on 27 June, covering the left flank of the Stalingrad Front. It first saw combat on 3 July and defended its positions until the beginning of the first Soviet counteroffensive near Stalingrad. During Operation Little Saturn, with the 1st Guards Army, the division went on the offensive on 16 December. Crossing the Don near Solontsy, Olkhovy, and Grushevo, it broke through fortified Axis defenses and developed the offensive to capture Boguchar on 19 December in cooperation with the 44th Guards Rifle Division.

== Guards conversion to the end of the war ==
In recognition of its courage in the initial stages of Operation Little Saturn, the 1st Rifle Division was converted into the 58th Guards Rifle Division, an elite Guards unit, on 31 December 1942. The 408th, 412th, and 415th Rifle Regiments became the 173rd, 175th, and 178th Guards Rifle Regiments, respectively, while the 1026th Artillery Regiment became the 130th Guards Artillery Regiment on 27 February 1943. Continuing the attack, the 58th Guards captured Millerovo alongside the 38th Guards Rifle Division on 17 January 1943. During February, it reached the Seversky Donets near Voroshilovgrad, contributing to the capture of the latter on 14 February. During the second half of February and early March, initially with the 1st Guards, then the 6th Army, and the 3rd Tank Army from mid-March, of the Southwestern Front, the division participated in the repulse of the German counteroffensive south of Kharkov.

In early August the division joined the 57th Army of the Steppe Front and fought in the Belgorod–Kharkov Offensive, then in the Battle of the Dnieper. For its courage in the battles for Krasnograd, the division received the name of the city as an honorific on 19 September. Division chief of staff Colonel Vladimir Rusakov succeeded to command of the 58th Guards on 24 September. The division began crossing the Dnieper north of Verkhnodniprovsk on 26 September, with the machine gun crew of Yefreytor Grigory Shtonda of the 175th Guards Rifle Regiment being among the first across. For repulsing German counterattacks and ensuring the crossing of the vanguard of the regiment, Shtonda was made a Hero of the Soviet Union. Between October and December the division fought in attacks toward Krivoy Rog with the 57th Army of the Steppe Front (the 2nd Ukrainian Front from 20 October).

In early 1944, the division was transferred to the 37th Army of the 3rd Ukrainian Front and fought in the Nikopol–Krivoy Rog Offensive, the Bereznegovatoye–Snigirevka Offensive, and the Odessa Offensive. Rusakov was wounded on 13 March and evacuated; he would return to the division in July and remained in command for the rest of its existence. For distinguishing itself in the capture of Voznesensk on 24 March the 58th Guards received the Order of the Red Banner on 29 March. In mid-July 1944, the division was transferred to the 5th Guards Army of the 1st Ukrainian Front, with which it served for the rest of the war. During the Lvov–Sandomierz Offensive, it entered the battle with the army and defeated the German forces counter-attacking from Mielec, then fought in the battles for the retention and the expansion of the Sandomierz bridgehead.

During the Sandomierz–Silesian Offensive of early 1945, the 58th Guards advanced more than 200 kilometers (120 mi) in eleven days, crossing the Oder on 23 January north of Oppeln. It captured and held a bridgehead in the area of Oderwerder. For their actions in the crossing of the Oder, thirteen soldiers of the division were made Heroes of the Soviet Union. The division fought in the Lower Silesian Offensive and the Upper Silesian Offensive in February and March. For the "exemplary performance of combat missions" in the breakthrough of German defenses and the defeat of German troops southwest of Oppeln, the 58th Guards received the Order of Suvorov, 2nd class, on 26 April.

The division broke through German defenses on the Neisse during the Berlin Offensive and on 25 April made contact with the American 69th Infantry Division at Torgau on the Elbe River on 25 April 1945, splitting Germany into two separate parts, an event that became known as Elbe Day.

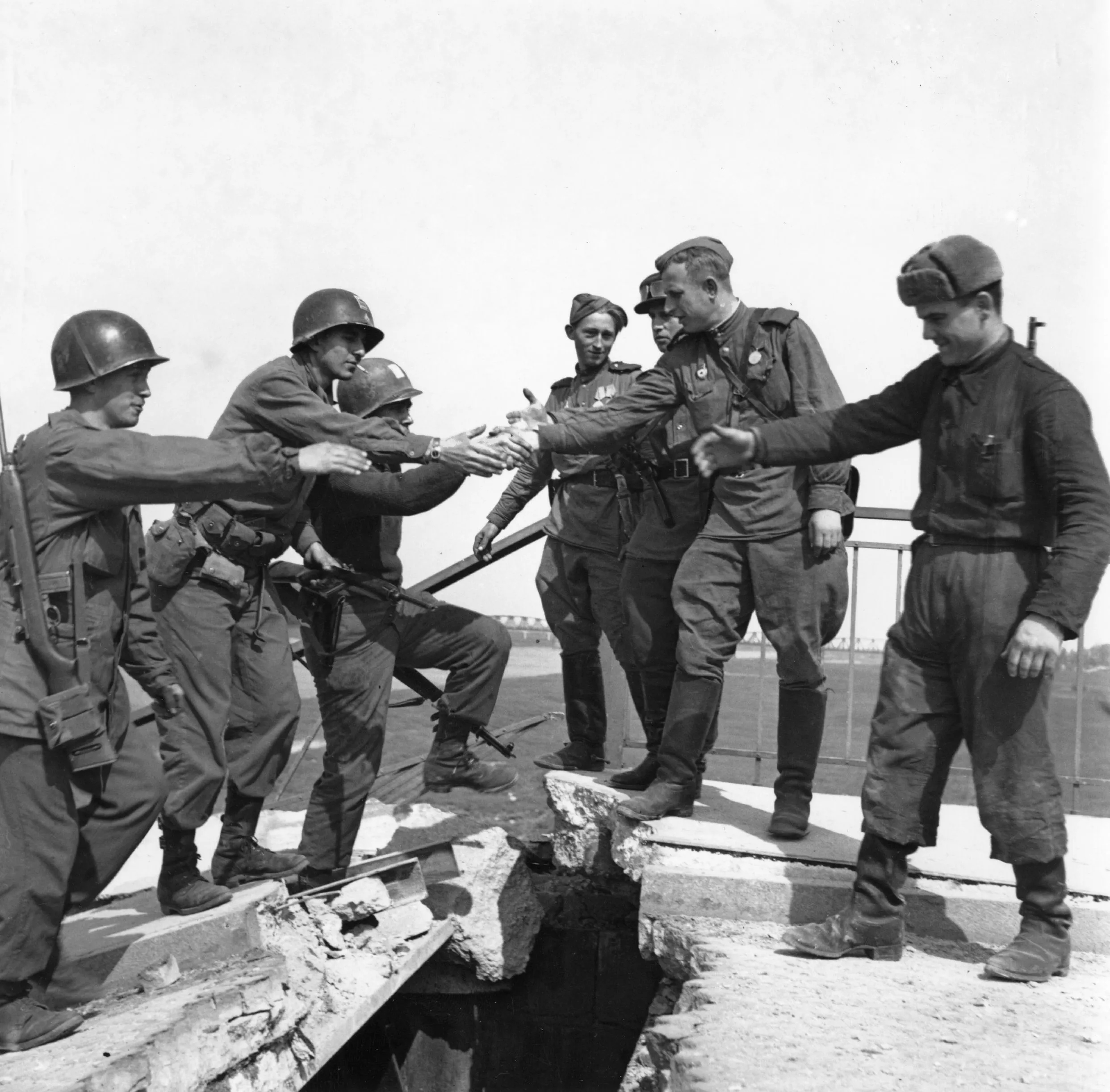
Soviet Lt. Charles Thau of the 58th Guards Rifle Division (center, looking into camera) behind the handshake, with U.S. 69th Infantry PFC Bernard E. Kirschenbaum (left center tallest figure), 25 April 1945

The first contact was made between patrols near Strehla, when U.S. First Lieutenant Albert Kotzebue crossed the River Elbe in a boat with three men of an intelligence and reconnaissance platoon. On the east bank, they met forward elements of the 175th Guards Rifle Regiment of the division, under the command of Lieutenant Colonel Alexander Gardiev. For breaking through to the Neisse, the division was awarded the Order of Lenin on 28 May. The units of the division rapidly advanced during the Prague Offensive, participating in the capture of Dresden on 8 May and on the next day reaching the vicinity of Beřkovice, 35 kilometers (22 mi) northwest of Prague. For distinguishing itself in the advance on Prague, the division received the name of the city as an honorific on 11 June. For their actions during the war, roughly 11,000 soldiers of the division were decorated, and 28 received the title Hero of the Soviet Union.

== Postwar ==
The division marched to České Budějovice between 30 May and 3 July, where it was brought up to strength with the personnel of the disbanded 253rd Rifle Division of the 3rd Guards Army and served on the demarcation line between the Allied and Soviet forces. During this period the division conducted combat training and was rated excellent at inspections for the summer training period. Relocated to Amstetten on 11 November 1945, the division served the demarcation line with American troops, responsible for a 180 kilometers (110 mi) sector. The division again received a rating of excellent in inspections carried out in May 1946 for the winter training period. The 58th Guards handed over their sector of the demarcation line to the 95th Guards Rifle Division on 17 May and transferred enlisted men not scheduled for demobilization to the 95th and 4th Guards Rifle Divisions. Most officers were sent to Tata to be transferred to the reserve, while some went to other units for further service. The remainder of the division moved to Pöchlarn on 22 May, where the transfer of all personnel and equipment was completed in June, finishing the disbandment process. The rest of the 33rd Guards Rifle Corps was also disbanded at the same time, still with the Central Group of Forces.

== Commanders ==
The following officers commanded the division:

- Major General Alexey Semyonov (June 1942 – January 1943)
- Colonel Dmitry Zherebin (promoted to major general 29 January 1943; January to April 1943)
- Colonel Gavriil Sorokin (April–June 1943)
- Colonel Pyotr Kasatkin (June–September 1943)
- Colonel Vladimir Rusakov (September 1943–April 1944)
- Colonel Vasily Katsurin (April–June 1944)
- Colonel Vladimir Rusakov (promoted to major general 13 September 1944; June 1944–June 1946)

== Notable people ==
- Alexander Gardiev, commander of the 175th Guards Rifle Regiment who met U.S. forces at the Elbe
- Vladimir Rusakov, division commander
- Grigory Shtonda, Hero of the Soviet Union honored for his actions crossing the Dnieper
- Alexander Silvashko, lieutenant photographed with U.S. Lieutenant William Robertson at Torgau
- Charles Thau, officer noted for appearing in the iconic Elbe Day link-up photo

== See Also ==
- Elbe Bridge handshake photograph
