= Vladimir Rusakov =

Soviet Army major general

Vladimir Vasilyevich Rusakov
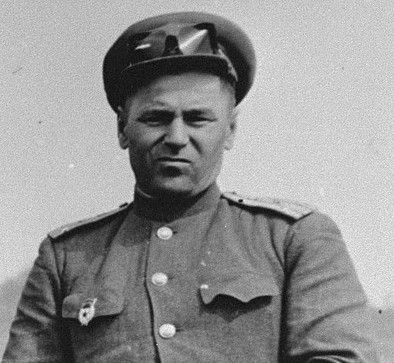
- Rusakov, 26 April 1945
- Born: 30 December 1909; Cheplyaev, Smolensk Governorate, Russian Empire
- Died: 12 October 1951 (aged 41) Moscow, Soviet Union
- Allegiance: Soviet Union
- Branch: Red Army (later Soviet Army)
- Service years: 1929–1951
- Rank: Lieutenant general
- Commands: 14th Guards Rifle Division; 58th Guards Rifle Division; 63rd Rifle Division
- Conflicts: World War II
- Awards: Order of Lenin; Order of the Red Banner (2); Order of Suvorov, 2nd class; Order of Kutuzov, 2nd class; Order of Bogdan Khmelnitsky, 2nd class; Order of the Red Star

Vladimir Vasilyevich Rusakov (Russian: Влади́мир Васи́льевич Русако́в; 30 December 1909 – 12 October 1951) was a Soviet Army major general.

After joining the Red Army at the end of the 1920s, Rusakov became a junior officer and served in the Soviet Far East before graduating from the Frunze Military Academy after Operation Barbarossa. He spent the first year of the war before being sent to the 14th Guards Rifle Division, which he commanded for much of 1943 before being relieved of command for slow fulfillment of orders. Within two weeks, he returned to command, this time of the 58th Guards Rifle Division. Rusakov led the division for the rest of its existence as it advanced westward, aside from several months recovering from a wound. It was the first Soviet unit to link up with American troops in late April 1945. Postwar Rusakov held brigade and division command but died of illness in 1951.

== Early life and prewar service ==
Born on 30 December 1909 in Cheplyaev, Smolensk Governorate, Rusakov joined the Red Army and entered the Vladivostok Infantry School on 15 September 1929. After graduating from the school, he was sent to the 5th Amur Rifle Regiment of the 2nd Priamur Rifle Division, with which he served as a machine gun platoon commander, acting machine gun company commander, and training platoon commander. Transferred to the Nikolayevsk-on-Amur Fortified Region of the Special Red Banner Far Eastern Army in June 1935, Rusakov became commander of the 8th Separate Machine Gun Company and acting chief of staff of the right-bank sector. He was sent to study at the Frunze Military Academy in July 1940.

== World War II ==
As a result of the outbreak of Operation Barbarossa, Rusakov's course was accelerated and on 12 September he graduated. With the rank of captain, he became a liaison officer at the General Staff for rifle divisions. Serving as a senior officer of the General Staff at the Northwestern Front headquarters from December, Rusakov became a General Staff officer at army headquarters in March 1942.

In July of that year he was appointed chief of the 1st staff department of the 14th Guards Rifle Division, reforming at Budarino with the 63rd Army. Between 10 and 13 August the division marched to the area of Bukanovskaya and reached positions on the left bank of the Don River. On the night of 20 August, the division crossed the river and captured a bridgehead on the right bank, fighting in a counterattack on the left flank of the German forces in Stalingrad. The division continued to fight in this bridgehead until 18 November 1942, when Operation Uranus began. The division fought with the 5th Tank Army and later the 1st Guards Army in the offensive and in October Rusakov became commander of the 38th Guards Rifle Regiment of the division before becoming division chief of staff in December.

Rusakov and the 14th Guards fought in Operation Little Saturn in the second half of December, during which the division captured Bokovskaya and Morozovsk, cutting off rail access to Stalingrad, then advanced towards Voroshilovgrad. During Operation Gallop, Rusakov succeeded to command of the division on 26 January 1943 as it advanced with the 3rd Guards Army. By 15 April, the division was relocated to the Belyi Kholodets area to take up defensive positions as a result of the German counteroffensive in the Third Battle of Kharkov. With the 57th Army of the Steppe Front, Rusakov led the division in the Belgorod–Kharkov Offensive, then in the advance into Left-bank Ukraine. In early September, after the capture of Merefa and the crossing of the Mzha River, the 57th Army did not see further offensive success. Rusakov, by then a colonel, was relieved of command of the division on 11 September for failing to timely comply with an order to capture Mikhailovka and Borki, and demoted to chief of staff of the 58th Guards Rifle Division.

Rusakov joined the 58th Guards during fighting for Krasnograd, for which it received the name of the city as an honorific. During the Battle of the Dnieper, on 24 September, he was given command of the division and tasked with crossing the Dnieper north of Verkhnedneprovsk. As part of the 27th Guards Rifle Corps of the 57th Army, the division was one of the first to cross the Dnieper north of Verkhnedneprovsk and captured a bridgehead on the right bank. Thirteen soldiers of the division were made Heroes of the Soviet Union for their actions and the 58th Guards was commended for its actions in the capture of Verkhnedneprovsk on 22 October. Between January and March 1944, the division fought in the Nikopol–Krivoi Rog Offensive, the Bereznegovatoye–Snigirevka Offensive, and the Odessa Offensive as part of the 37th Army. During the Odessa Offensive, Rusakov was wounded on 13 March and was evacuated to a hospital, where he remained until July. Having recovered, he returned to the 58th Guards, which he commanded for the rest of its existence, being promoted to major general on 13 September 1944.

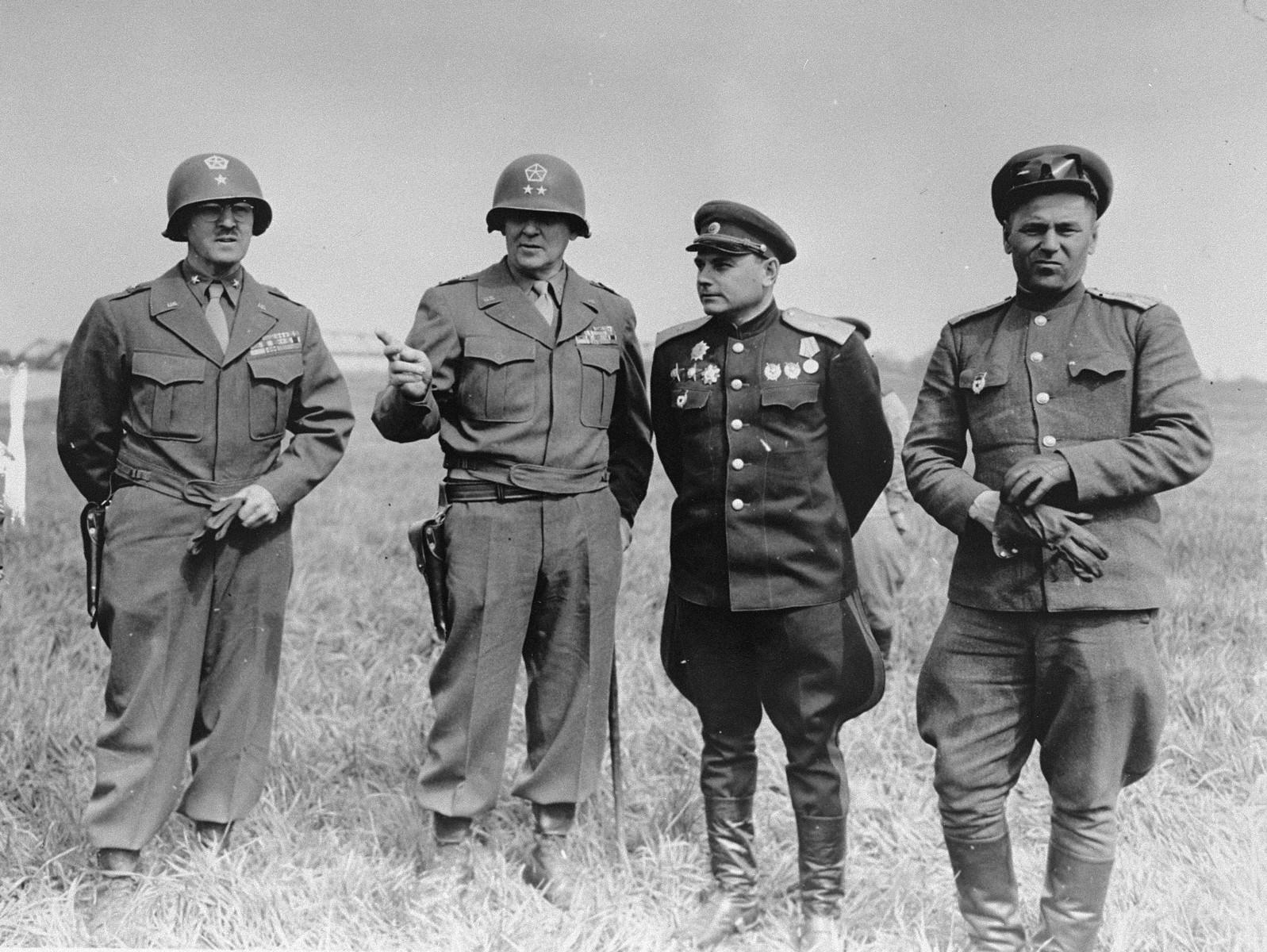
Rusakov (far right) in a posed photo of Soviet and American generals on the banks of the Elbe at Torgau, 26 April. 34th Guards Rifle Corps commander Gleb Baklanov is to his left.

Rusakov led the division as part of the 34th Guards Rifle Corps of the 5th Guards Army in the Sandomierz–Silesian Offensive, the Lower Silesian Offensive, the Upper Silesian Offensive, the Berlin Offensive, and the Prague Offensive. The division was decorated for its breakthrough of German defenses near Oppeln and capture of a bridgehead on the Oder, and the crossing of the Neisse. Pursuing retreating German troops, the division was the first in the corps to reach the Elbe in the vicinity of Riesa and Torgau and link up with American troops from the 69th Infantry Division in what became known as Elbe Day on 25 April. On the next day, Rusakov met his 69th Division commander Major General Emil F. Reinhardt, in the first official link-up ceremony. The division ended the war in the Prague Offensive, participating in the capture of Dresden on 8 May.

== Postwar ==
After the end of the war, Rusakov continued to command the division as part of the Central Group of Forces until it was disbanded, after which he was appointed commander of the 34th Separate Vyborg Brigade of the MVD Troops in July 1946. He completed the one-year Improvement Courses for Rifle Division Commanders at the Frunze Academy in February 1950, after which he was appointed commander of the 63rd Rifle Division of the Primorsky Military District. Suffering from a terminal illness, Rusakov died in Moscow on 12 October 1951.

== Awards and honors ==
Rusakov was a recipient of the following awards and decorations:

- Order of Lenin
- Order of the Red Banner (2)
- Order of Suvorov, 2nd class
- Order of Kutuzov, 2nd class
- Order of Bogdan Khmelnitsky, 2nd class
- Order of the Red Star
- Medals
- Foreign orders and medals
