= 14th Guards Rifle Division =

- Active: 1942–1946
- Country: Soviet Union
- Branch: Red Army
- Type: Division
- Role: Infantry
- Engagements: World War II; Barvenkovo–Lozovaya Offensive; Second Battle of Kharkov; Battle of Stalingrad; Operation Uranus; Operation Little Saturn; Operation Gallop; Poltava-Kremenchug Offensive; Battle of the Dniepr; Uman–Botoșani Offensive; First Jassy–Kishinev Offensive; Lvov–Sandomierz Offensive; Vistula-Oder Offensive; Lower Silesian Offensive; Battle of Berlin; Battle of the Oder–Neisse; Spremberg–Torgau Offensive Operation; Battle of Bautzen; Prague Offensive
- Decorations: Order of Lenin; Order of the Red Banner; Order of Kutuzov
- Battle honours: Vinnitsa; In the name of Jan Fabricius

Commanders
- Notable commanders: Maj. Gen. Ivan Shepetov; Maj. Gen. Afanasy Gryaznov; Col. Vladimir Rusakov; Col. Georgii Pavlovich Slatov; Maj. Gen. Vikentii Vasilevich Skryganov

The 14th Guards Rifle Division was reformed as an elite infantry division of the Red Army in January, 1942, based on the 1st formation of the 96th Rifle Division, which was officially a mountain unit at the time, and served in that role until after the end of the Great Patriotic War. It was on Southern Front when it was redesignated and was soon assigned to the 57th Army. It was encircled during the May German counterattack in the Second Battle of Kharkov. Its first commander was made a prisoner of war, later dying in German captivity. A cadre of the division managed to escape and was sent to the Reserve of the Supreme High Command for rebuilding. In July it joined the 63rd Army and took part in the attacks against the Italian 8th Army that created the bridgehead south of the Don River near Serafimovich during August. In October, now in the 21st Army of Don Front, it was active in two probing attacks against the Romanian forces now containing the bridgehead which inflicted severe casualties in advance of the Soviet winter counteroffensive. At the start of that offensive the division was in 5th Tank Army, but was soon transferred to 1st Guards Army and then to the 3rd Guards Army when that was formed. It was under this Army as it advanced into the Donbas in late winter before returning to 57th Army during most of 1943, fighting through east Ukraine and across the lower Dniepr by the end of the year. After being briefly assigned to 53rd Army in December it was moved to 5th Guards Army in February, 1944 where it remained for the duration, mostly in the 33rd Guards Rifle Corps. It saw action in the Uman–Botoșani Offensive and won its first decoration, the Order of the Red Banner, as it advanced, before being involved in the frustrating battles along the Dniestr River on the Romanian border. In late spring, 1944 the division was redeployed north becoming part of 1st Ukrainian Front and taking part in the Lvov–Sandomierz Offensive into Poland. The 14th Guards made a spectacular advance across Poland during the Vistula-Oder Offensive and was awarded the Order of Lenin for its part in the liberation of Sandomierz. On January 22, 1945, its commander suffered mortal wounds in the fighting for a bridgehead over the Oder River. In the drive on Berlin in April the division and its regiments won further honors and decorations but despite these distinctions it was disbanded in August, 1946.

== Formation ==
The division was officially raised to Guards status on January 24, 1942, in recognition of its role in the first liberation of Rostov-on-Don on December 2, 1941. Its sub-units would not receive their Guards redesignations until February. The 96th had been originally formed as the 24th Rifle "Vinnitsa" Division in November, 1923 in recognition of where it was formed before being renumbered in May, 1924. In September, 1929 it added the honorific "in the name of Jan Fabricius". When it became the 14th Guards it continued to carry these titles as parts of its official designation. In April, 1940 it had been converted to a mountain rifle division and although it is sometimes referred to as a regular rifle division from about October 1 onward in Soviet records it never officially had its designation changed prior to becoming a Guards unit. Its order of battle, based on the first wartime shtat (table of organization and equipment) for rifle divisions, while maintaining some of its mountain equipment (for example, 107mm mortars in place of 120mm mortars), was eventually as follows:

- 36th Guards Rifle Regiment (from 43rd Mountain Rifle Regiment)
- 38th Guards Rifle Regiment (from 209th Mountain Rifle Regiment)
- 41st Guards Rifle Regiment (from 651st Mountain Rifle Regiment)
- 33rd Guards Artillery Regiment (from 146th Mountain Artillery Regiment)
- 6th Guards Antitank Battalion (from 63rd Antitank Battalion)
- 11th Guards Reconnaissance Company
- 13th Guards Sapper Battalion
- 16th Guards Signal Battalion
- 17th Guards Medical/Sanitation Battalion
- 8th Guards Chemical Defense (Anti-gas) Company
- 9th Guards Motor Transport Company
- 15th Guards Field Bakery
- 1st Guards Divisional Veterinary Hospital
- 1455th Field Postal Station
- 362nd Field Office of the State Bank

Maj. Gen. Ivan Shepetov, who had led the 96th (Mountain) Rifle Division since 1940, remained in command. At the time it was redesignated the division was in 37th Army of Southern Front. During February it was transferred to 57th Army in the same Front which was well inside the salient created during the Barvenkovo–Lozovaya offensive which had recently ended.

== Second Battle of Kharkov ==
At the beginning of May 57th Army was still located in the southwest sector of the salient with its positions centered on Star Bliznetsy to the east of Lozovaya. 14th Guards constituted the Army reserve and had its main forces in the former town and one regiment in the latter. Southwestern Front launched an offensive to liberate Kharkov on May 12; Southern Front had no direct role in this even though the southern pincer of the offensive was being launched from the northwest sector of the salient. In the early going the attacking Soviet forces, Army Group Bobkin and 6th Army, made good progress in the direction of Krasnograd, reaching its outskirts by May 15. However the German Army Group South was planning its own operation to end the threat by cutting off the salient entirely; to this end it began regrouping mobile forces to its south, aiming at the 9th Army to the east of 57th Army. On the morning of May 17 the regrouping was complete and the German forces, led by the 14th and 16th Panzer Divisions, went over to the attack.

By 1700 hours the 14th Panzer had captured Barvenkovo. While 14th Guards covered the 57th Army's alternate command post at Star Bliznetsy, the main post was soon overrun. Due to the breakdown in communications the division received no orders to go into battle and remained in place all day, between 20 and 30 km from the front line. Overall the German advance had torn 9th Army's defenses apart and left 57th Army in a grave position. It wasn't until the next morning that a directive was received for the division to move east and attack the left flank of the German penetration along with the 2nd Cavalry Corps. Late that day the commander of the Army, Lt. Gen. K. P. Podlas, was killed while leading some of his encircled troops, further worsening the command situation. At the same time the 14th Guards and 2nd Cavalry were fighting to contain the German attack along a line from Novo-Prigozhaia to Prigozhaia to Margaritovka. By midday on May 19 Marshal S. K. Timoshenko, commander of Southwestern Front, acknowledged that his offensive had failed and began moving the mobile forces of 6th Army against the breakthrough sector.

On May 20 the 14th Panzer continued its advance to the north against desperate resistance while the 16th Panzer and 60th Motorized Division struck east towards Lozovaya in an effort to encircle 57th Army. This forced 14th Guards back several kilometres but proved temporary as the German command decided to complete the encirclement of the entire salient instead. On the afternoon of May 22 14th Panzer linked up with the 44th Infantry Division of German 6th Army and this was achieved. The division began moving north in an effort to find an escape route, reaching the south end of the German corridor west of Marevka the next day. The Soviet front along the Donets was 40 km away. The encircled forces formed a shock group from the 317th, 393rd and 150th Rifle Divisions, backed by cavalry and tanks, to make a breakthrough while the 14th Guards and remnants of several other divisions were to defend firmly to protect the shock group from the south and southwest. This disorganized effort began at 1000 hours on May 25 and while it made initial progress it soon ran into the 1st Mountain Division within the corridor and was badly shot up. Over the following days the main forces of the division were forced to the west and it's unknown how many of its men managed to break free. General Shepetov was severely wounded and captured near Izium after someone betrayed his location. He survived in the German Flossenbürg concentration camp until May 21, 1943, when he was executed for anti-fascist agitation.

== Operation Blue ==
As of June 1 the remnants of 14th Guards were still in 57th Army, but required considerable rebuilding. Maj. Gen. Afanasy Gryaznov was appointed to command on the same day. By the beginning of July the division was in the Reserve of the Supreme High Command in 5th Reserve Army, being brought back to strength as the German summer offensive unfolded. On July 12 the STAVKA ordered Southwestern Front to be renamed as Stalingrad Front and to have four armies incorporated into its forces, including the former 5th Reserve as 63rd Army. The orders continued: "Defend the eastern bank of the Don River with the 63rd Army in the sector it occupies and prevent the enemy from forcing the Don River under any circumstances." The Army was to link its left flank to the 21st Army in the area of Serafimovich. It remained in this general situation at the start of August.

As the German 6th Army prepared to drive from the Don to Stalingrad the commander of Stalingrad Front, Col. Gen. A. I. Yeryomenko, issued orders on August 18/19 for a series of coordinated counterattacks by his armies to tie down German forces. 63rd Army was directed to advance from a 15 km-wide sector west of the Khopyor River southwards across the Don towards Chebotarevskii, Klinovoi and Perelazovskii with 14th Guards and 197th Rifle Divisions with an immediate objective 15–20 km south of the river. The attack began at dawn on August 20 and faced the Italian 2nd Infantry Division of 8th Army's XXXV Corps, which had only moved into the sector four days earlier. It gained immediate success and soon held a bridgehead 2–3 km deep:

14th Gds. RD was fighting along the line Tiukovnovskii-Zatonskii-Zimovskii with its forward units at 1100 hours on 20 August and crossing the Don River with its main forces. Captured: 63 enemy prisoners, 6 guns, 15 mortars, 23 machine guns, 125,000 rounds of ammunition, and one radio...

Continuing their advance over the next two days the two attacking divisions were soon reinforced by 203rd Rifle Division and 21st Army's 304th Rifle Division. By then they had expanded their bridgehead to a depth of 2–10 km, with 14th Guards at the deepest point, the village of Kotovsky. By the time the attack wound down on August 28 the combined Soviet assault force had carved a bridgehead 50 km wide and up to 25 km deep on the south bank of the Don.

In September Stalingrad Front was reorganized and 63rd Army was reassigned to the new Don Front. Between October 1 and 10 the German Army Group B moved all of Romanian 3rd Army into the defenses facing the Serafimovich bridgehead and the western end of the Kletskaya bridgehead. The commander of 3rd Army, Gen. P. Dumitrescu, sensed the threat posed by these bridgeheads and on September 24 had requested German backing to mount an offensive against them while his Army was still not completely committed. This request was turned down by the German high command, which did not want any resources diverted from the fighting in Stalingrad. In October the 14th Guards was transferred to 21st Army, now in Southwestern Front. Beginning on the night of October 13/14 the division, along with the 124th Rifle Division, began an intense probing attack against the Romanian forces which continued until the 16th, followed by another on its own overnight on October 19/20. The intention was to draw German forces away from Stalingrad but not incidentally these attacks, along with a third by 76th Rifle Division on October 24–27, inflicted 13,154 casualties on 3rd Army, roughly the equivalent of what the British 8th Army would suffer in the concurrent Second Battle of El Alamein.

=== Operation Uranus ===
In the buildup to the Soviet counteroffensive against the German forces at Stalingrad the 14th Guards was again reassigned, now to the 5th Tank Army, which would be the main shock group of Southwestern Front. Before the main offensive began on November 19 all four of the Army's first-echelon rifle divisions conducted a reconnaissance-in-force with reinforced rifle battalions on the night of November 17/18. Overcoming Romanian forward security outposts and eliminating obstacles as they were encountered the division advanced nearly 2 km into the positions of Romanian 9th Infantry Division to the southern slope of Hill 220 and the northern outskirts of State Farm (Sovkhoz) No. 3. This reconnaissance was effective in uncovering and removing minefields and other engineering works and identified many strongpoints in the main defensive line as well as weak spots.

When the true offensive began the 14th Guards manned security positions in a 15 km-wide sector, concealing the forward deployment of the 47th Guards and 119th Rifle Divisions into their jumping-off positions for the assault. The division had four tank destroyer regiments attached to support and protect its advance and there was a total of 138 tanks in the bridgehead in the infantry support role. It was on the Army's right (west) flank in much the same positions it had won in August. The attack began between 0848 and 0850 hours Moscow time and during the first hour the rifle divisions overcame the Romanian first defensive positions with relative ease. Following this the 14th Guards found the going much more difficult. With no armor support the division's multiple assaults were broken up by intense flanking artillery, mortar and machine gun fire from a Romanian strongpoint on Hill 228, 4 km northwest of Sovkhoz No. 3. The commander of 1st Guards Army to the west attempted to assist with an attack by his 203rd Rifle Division but this failed in the face of determined resistance by the Romanian 11th Infantry Division. By now Romanian resistance was stiffening throughout 5th Tank's sector, evidence that the artillery preparation had not been as effective as planned.

By noon the commander of 5th Tank, Lt. Gen. P. L. Romanenko, decided that if the offensive was to succeed he would have to commit his 1st and 26th Tank Corps. These corps stepped off at 1400 hours, east of the 14th Guards' sector, and effectively obliterated two regiments of the Romanian 14th Infantry Division. While two regiments of the division remained stalled in front of the Romanian defenses, its left-wing regiment managed to exploit the tank-assisted success of 47th Guards with an advance of up to 2 km. Over the course of the next day the division continued to slowly move ahead as 9th Romanian refused its right flank to the west and 47th Guards and 8th Cavalry Corps exploited into the gap in the Romanian defenses. The Romanian resistance was so stout that Romanenko was forced to commit his reserve 159th Rifle Division to the fight. In addition a desperate counterattack by the 9th and elements of the 11th Romanian Divisions compelled Romanenko to further reinforce his flank with the 21st Cavalry Division of 8th Cavalry Corps; this reinforced Soviet grouping, supported by a handful of tanks from 1st Tank Corps, forced the two Romanian divisions to withdraw.

On November 21, as most of Romanian 3rd Army was being encircled between 5th Tank and 21st Armies the 14th Guards, along with its reinforcements, continued to push the 9th Romanian west and southwest toward the Krivaia River. In the course of this the 21st Cavalry, many mounted on tanks, overran the headquarters of the Romanian division. Farther to the right the 14th Guards got into its stride, crushing the Romanians' right wing 12–14km east of Verkhnyi Gorbatovsky. The division encircled and captured most of a Romanian infantry regiment during the day, pursuing its remnants and liberating the village before nightfall. The next day General Romanenko was ordered to transfer the division and its supporting artillery to the 1st Guards Army effective on November 23. During the day it conducted local attacks and raids east of the Krivaia in cooperation with the 203rd and 278th Rifle Divisions, penetrating the defenses of the Romanian 9th and 11th Divisions and liberating the towns of Dubovskoi, Rubashkin, Bakhmutkin and Yagodnyi on the Krivaia, 50–55 km west-southwest of Serafimovich. Late on the same day forces of the Southwestern and Stalingrad Fronts met and sealed the encirclement of the German forces at Stalingrad.

1st Guards Army set out to encircle and destroy the Romanian 7th and 11th Divisions on November 24, which were defending a wedge of territory between the Don and Krivaia Rivers. The 14th Guards and 203rd Divisions were tasked with attacking westward across the Krivaia on a 6 km-wide sector from Gorbatovskaia to Ushakov against the 11th Romanian. At about midday the 266th Rifle Division was ordered into the boundary between the two divisions to fend off any German counterattacks that might materialize. Although most of the attack failed to develop as planned, the division, reinforced by the 266th during the day, penetrated the Romanian defenses and during the day advanced westward up to 16 km. By nightfall General Gryaznov reported that his division "attacked the enemy along the 2nd Section State Farm - Ilin - Dulensky line and advanced from 5-16 kilometres, reaching the Konkov, Vislogubov, and Nizhnye Luchki line before being halted." However, Gen. K. A. Hollidt, commander of the German XVII Army Corps, soon dispatched his 62nd and 294th Infantry Divisions with orders to reinforce the Romanians and drive the Soviet forces back across the Krivaia. The next day the 159th Rifle Division of 5th Tank Army moved to tie in closely to the left flank of 14th Guards. The German counterstroke began on November 27 and was successful; the 14th Guards was forced back across the Krivaia.

=== Operation Little Saturn ===
As the Axis defenses along the Krivaia and Chir rivers crystallized the Soviet command was forced to reassess its plans. 1st Guards Army had been earmarked for Operation Saturn, which had been intended to destroy the entire Axis position in the Caucasus region. Now circumstances, including the sheer size of the German force encircled at Stalingrad, required a change in plans. On the morning of December 5 the 1st Guards was split with its eastern half, including 14th Guards, becoming the new 3rd Guards Army. Several days earlier the division had been subordinated to the 14th Rifle Corps along with the 203rd Division. The operation, which would also include the 6th Army of Voronezh Front, targeted the German XVII Corps, the weakened divisions of Romanian I Corps and the bulk of Italian 8th Army.

The offensive began on December 16 and the 14th Guards, supported by the 114th Separate Tank Regiment and leading the 1st Guards Mechanized Corps, crashed through the defenses of the German 294th Infantry at Astakhov. Although Army Group Don recorded that the Soviet force lost 17 tanks destroyed and four damaged, it also admitted that "the heights from east of Kriuscha Tal [gorge] to Hill 156 are in enemy hands." The German division brought up reserves which stalled further advance that day, but on the 17th the 1st Guards Mechanized was committed to complete the breakthrough. This was successful, and allowed the division to re-occupy Dulensky by the end of the day. On December 18 the two Soviet units, now joined by 203rd Division, continued to attack and by the end of the day recaptured Konkov, as well as Bokovskaya and Staryi Zemtsov, which broke the last German fortified line. Over three days the Soviet grouping had advanced 15–20km and began to pursue the German 294th and 62nd Divisions, plus the Romanian 7th and 11th, striving to complete their encirclement and destruction in the Kruzhilin area. During the day of December 19 the 14th Rifle and 1st Guards Mechanized Corps, advancing from the south, met the 197th Rifle Division advancing from the north in the Kruzhilin area, completing 3rd Guards Army's immediate task. However, on the previous day and overnight the Axis managed to pull out a significant portion of its forces from the pocket and consolidate along the south bank of the Chir. The 3rd Guards commander, Lt. Gen. D. D. Lelyushenko, was ordered to immediately turn the Army's main forces to the south and organize an unremitting pursuit.

== Into Ukraine ==
On December 21 General Gryasnov took over command of the 14th Rifle Corps while remaining in command of the 14th Guards. On January 24, 1943, he was given command of the 15th Rifle Corps and handed the division over to Col. Vladimir Rusakov. By the beginning of February the 3rd Guards Army held a bridgehead over the Northern Donets River south of Voroshilovgrad from which it broke out in a drive to liberate that city. In the plan for the offensive the 14th Rifle Corps (now consisting of the 14th and 61st Guards Rifle Divisions) was not part of the Army's shock group but was instead to reach a line from Georgievskoe to Orekhova to Semeikino to guard its flank from any attack from the southwest. By February 4 the 14th Corps, supported by the 169th Tank Brigade, was operating in the area of heights 207, 202.8 and 206.9. Two days later German forces counterattacked the 61st Guards but were repelled; on February 7 a more powerful attack was made by elements of the 3rd SS Panzer Division supported by 40 tanks which broke through the Soviet front and captured Orlovka, Belo-Skelevatyi and Nizhnii and Verkhnii Gabun. This attack brought the advance on Voroshilovgrad to a halt.

After regrouping his Army General Lelyushenko decided to go over to a decisive offensive on the morning of February 12 to take Voroshilovgrad and subsequently carry out the Army's main task of reaching the Stalino - Ordzhonikidze area. East of the Luganchik River at 0500 hours the 61st Guards' 558th Rifle Regiment, with the 14th Guards' training battalion and two battalions of the 229th Rifle Brigade, defeated the German garrisons in Orlovka and Belo-Skelevatyi. Simultaneously Popovka was seized by the main body of the division, backed by support elements of the 14th Corps, and continued advancing, reaching the Lutugino area by the end of February 14. That morning other units of the 3rd Guards Army, chiefly the 59th Guards and 243rd Rifle Divisions and elements of 2nd Tank Corps, had cleared the city. After this victory the 3rd Guards and 5th Tank Armies pressed on towards Stalino, but on February 20 the German 4th and 1st Panzer Armies began the counteroffensive that would become the Third Battle of Kharkov. While this was primarily aimed at Voronezh Front, Southwestern Front also faced attacks and the overall crisis made any further Soviet advance impossible.

=== Battle of the Dniepr ===
In April the 14th Guards returned to 57th Army, still in Southwestern Front, where it came under the 27th Guards Rifle Corps. In July that Corps was moved to 6th Army in the same Front. In August the division was once again assigned to 57th Army, this time to the 64th Rifle Corps; the Army was now part of Steppe Front. Under these headquarters it took part in the Poltava-Kremenchug Offensive beginning on August 26. Colonel Rusakov was replaced in command by Col. Georgii Pavlovich Slatov on September 9. On September 25 the division reached the Dniepr River and the 11th Guards Reconnaissance Company (which was now motorized) forced a crossing under German fire near the village of Pushkarevka which is now part of the city of Verkhnodniprovsk. In recognition of their gallantry, five men of the company were made Heroes of the Soviet Union on December 20.

=== First Jassy-Kishinev Offensive ===
In October the division left 64th Corps to come under direct command of 57th Army in the 2nd Ukrainian (former Steppe) Front, while a month later it moved to direct Front control. In December it was again reassigned, now to 53rd Army's 48th Rifle Corps in the same Front. At this time the division's personnel were noted as being roughly 50 percent Russian and 50 percent of several Asian nationalities. On January 29, 1944, Colonel Slatov handed the division over to Col. Vikentii Vasilevich Skryganov; this officer would be promoted to the rank of major general on September 13. In February the 48th Corps was transferred to 5th Guards Army of the same Front and in March the 14th Guards was reassigned to 33rd Guards Rifle Corps; the division would remain in this Army for the duration of the war.

During the Uman–Botoșani Offensive the division took part in the liberation of Novoukrainka on March 17 for which it was decorated on March 29 with the Order of the Red Banner. By mid-April the 5th Guards Army was approaching the Dniestr River in the vicinity of Grigoriopol. 33rd Guards Corps (14th Guards, 9th Guards Airborne and 214th Rifle Divisions) was on the Army's right (north) flank; the Army was on the far left flank of its Front. The Army commander, Lt. Gen. Aleksey Zhadov, had already ordered the Corps to force a crossing of the Dniestr and develop its offensive towards Cimișeni. The Corps faced defenses manned by the German 4th Mountain Division of XXXX Panzer Corps.

The Army began crossing operations, mostly using improvised means, immediately upon reaching the east bank of April 12. The first across was a regiment of 95th Guards Rifle Division of 32nd Guards Rifle Corps. 33rd Guards Corps was intended to cross further north, closer to Grigoriopol but all three divisions were unsuccessful overnight on April 12/13. On April 13 and 14 the remainder of 32nd Guards Corps crossed into the 95th Guards' bridgehead and expanded it by capturing the village of Puhăceni and the town of Speia. General Zhadov ordered 33rd Guards Corps into the bridgehead as well, which was completed by the end of April 16. The bridgehead was now about 12 km wide and 8 km deep and engineering efforts across the river had allowed Zhadov to move tanks and other heavy weapons into it so offensive operations could be resumed in the direction of Chișinău. 33rd Guards Corps was in the northern half of the bridgehead with the 14th Guards tying in to 32nd Guards Corps to its south.

Zhadov launched his attack at dawn on April 16 after a two-hour artillery and airstrike preparation; 14th Guards was in the second echelon. After about two hours of fighting the first echelon divisions with armor support overpowered the German 320th Infantry Division's forward security belt and by 0930 hours had torn a hole up to 2 km wide and 3 km deep in the German defenses. The most significant gains were made in a sector 3–6 km south of the village of Delacău where the German second defensive position was breached up to 2 km deep. However at 1030 hours the German forces replied with their own intense artillery fire and airstrikes and a wave of counterattacks that halted 5th Guards Army in its tracks. Further attacks at 1500 hours by 4th Mountain and 294th Infantry and 13th Panzer Divisions did considerable damage to 95th and 13th Guards Divisions. When the fighting finally died down late on April 17 both sides were thoroughly exhausted and the 5th Guards was back to its starting point. A renewed attack on the 18th, which likely had 14th Guards in the first echelon, made no progress. The bridgehead was reinforced over the following days and a new effort was mounted on April 25 and this time expanded the area of the bridgehead by about one-third; 33rd Guards Corps had advanced 8–10 km by May 6. By now it was clear that no successful advance on Chișinău would be made on this axis and 5th Guards was replaced in the bridgehead by 8th Guards Army while the former was redeployed to the northwest for a new assault on Iași in mid-May.

The handover did not go smoothly as the German 6th Army launched new attacks on the bridgehead as it was happening and many of 5th Guards' rifle divisions had to withdraw under enemy fire. Ultimately the Army did not begin concentrating northeast of Iași until May 15 and did not complete the process until the first week of June. This delay, among other events, forced the STAVKA to postpone and later cancel the entire operation. Meanwhile, the commander of 2nd Ukrainian Front, Marshal I. S. Konev, was transferred to command of 1st Ukrainian Front on May 24. In June the 5th Guards Army was moved to the Reserve of the Supreme High Command and by the beginning of July it was under command of the same Front. The 14th Guards would remain in this Front for the duration.

== Into Poland and Germany ==
About the beginning of August the personnel of the division were noted as being 25 percent Russian, 50 percent Ukrainian, 15 percent Moldovan, and 10 percent several Asian nationalities. Under 1st Ukrainian Front the division took part in the Lvov–Sandomierz Offensive. In early August the 5th Guards Army entered the bridgehead over the Vistula that had been created by the 6th Guards Tank Corps near Baranów Sandomierski. In September the division was moved to the 101st Rifle Corps of 38th Army in the same Front. It was under these commands when the bridgehead was hit by heavy German counterattacks from October 14–18. In the Draganovo and Palatsuvka region for a short time the German forces managed to encircle several Soviet divisions including the 14th Guards. During its escape the division destroyed 22 enemy guns, 40 mortars, 125 machine guns, while killing up to 2,000 German soldiers and officers and capturing another 27. During the five-day battle the division lost 770 men killed and 2,590 wounded. Later that month the division returned to its previous corps and army.

1st Ukrainian Front launched its part of the Vistula-Oder Offensive on January 12, 1945. On the first day the 14th Guards broke through the entire depth of the German defenses west of Sandomierz and continued to advance through Poland for the next 11 days, covering 265 km during that time, killing 1,360 German officers and men and destroying or capturing 17 tanks, 60 guns or mortars, 105 machine guns and 178 motor vehicles. On the night of January 21/22 the division crossed the Oder River off the march 16 km northwest of Oppeln. During the advance the 41st Guards Rifle Regiment was awarded an honorific:

"CHESTOCHOWA"... 41st Guards Rifle Regiment (Lt. Colonel Zhinzhikov, Sergei Vasilevich)... The troops who participated in the liberation of Chestochowa and several other towns, by the order of the Supreme High Command of 17 January 1945, and a commendation in Moscow, are given a salute of 20 artillery salvoes from 224 guns.

The Oder bridgehead came under heavy German counterattacks on January 22 and in the course of these General Skryganov was mortally wounded and died on January 26. On April 6 Skryganov would be posthumously made a Hero of the Soviet Union. On February 19 the 14th Guards was decorated with the Order of Lenin, a rare distinction for a rifle division, for its part in the fighting in and around Sandomierz. On the same date the 33rd Guards Artillery Regiment received the Order of the Red Banner and the 41st Guards Rifle was awarded the Order of Kutuzov, 3rd Degree, both for their successes in the fighting for Silesia. The 33rd Guards Artillery and the 38th Guards Rifle were further granted "Wisła" as a battle honor while the 36th Guards Rifle received "Silesia" as the same.

=== Lower Silesian Offensive ===
Following the death of General Skryganov the division would be commanded by a succession of colonels: Aleksey Yakovlevich Goryachev (January 26 - March 14); Sigismund Adolfovich Losik-Savitzkii (March 15 - April 20); and Pavel Ivanovich Sikorsky (April 21 - May 11). Beginning on February 8 the 5th Guards Army took part in the Front's Lower Silesian Offensive with its main objective of encircling the German garrison of Breslau. On its sector the offensive was based on the bridgehead seized by 14th Guards in January. The German defense was based on the 269th Infantry Division with several battlegroups, five independent battalions, two panzer battalions and an NCO school. The Army's attack was led by 32nd Guards Rifle Corps and developed slowly over the first three days in large part due to the large number of fortified villages to be overcome and the ammunition shortage faced by all Soviet forces after the breakneck advance through Poland. On February 11 Marshal Konev shifted the 31st Tank Corps from 21st Army and committed it on the sector of 33rd Guards Corps the next day with the immediate objective of capturing the Bogenau area.

On February 13 the Army's offensive developed more successfully than in the preceding days. German resistance did not abate and if anything increased as further forces entered the Breslau area but despite this the 4th Guards and 31st Tank Corps linked up with the 7th Guards Mechanized Corps of 6th Army to complete the encirclement. Konev chose to leave 6th Army to maintain the siege while the 32nd and 33rd Guards Corps of 5th Guards Army were ordered to make a decisive attack from the Magnitz area toward Koberwitz and then to the southwest. The former Corps was reinforced with the 14th Guards, whose former sector was taken over by forces from 21st Army. During the fighting on February 15 the width of the cordon between Breslau and the main German forces was increased to up to 13 km. By the end of February 17 the 32nd Guards Corps had arrived in the Liegnitz area, relieving the 3rd Guards Tank Army's 9th Mechanized Corps which then undertook a forced night march which brought it to Bober River in the Lewenberg area. By the beginning of March the division had returned to 33rd Guards Corps.

=== Berlin Operation ===
Prior to the start of the Berlin offensive the 14th Guards was again reassigned within 5th Guards Army, now to the 34th Guards Rifle Corps where it joined the 15th and 58th Guards Rifle Divisions. The Army was deployed along the eastern bank of the Neisse River on a 13 km front and planned to launch its main attack with its right wing on the 8 km sector from Gross Saerchen to Muskau. 34th Guards Corps was in the first echelon with its divisions in a single echelon, but the 14th Guards was not on the attack sector. When the offensive began on April 16 the Army's main forces crossed the Neisse under the cover of massed artillery fire. The first task of 34th Guards Corps was to eliminate a German bridgehead on the eastern bank in the Muskau area. This done, the 15th and 58th Guards Divisions advanced as much as 6 km into the German defenses on the west bank. Early the next day the 15th Guards helped clear the passage of the 14th Guards by advancing into the rear of the German forces it was facing.

By April 22 the 5th Guards Army was pursuing defeated German forces to the west, destroying rearguards and advancing 30 km during the day. 14th Guards was in part responsible for securing the Army's left flank which had grown to almost 100 km in length and was holding along a line from Broten to Wittichenau to Buchwalde with its front facing south. Over the next two days a German force based on elements of 17th and 4th Panzer Armies launched a counteroffensive which broke through the 52nd Army's front along its boundary with the 2nd Polish Army and continued north in the general direction of Spremberg. To counter this effort, Konev ordered Zhadov to use the 33rd Guards Corps and the 14th Guards to attack towards Losa and Ugist (north of Bautzen) and reestablish contact with the Poles. This effort brought the German attack to a halt by the end of April 24. On the next day the 58th Guards Division joined hands with the U.S. 69th Infantry Division at Torgau.

On April 26 Zhadov ordered the 14th Guards to capture Kamenz and link up its left flank to the Polish Army. Fighting continued in this area through April 27–30 with no significant changes in the situation until the German grouping was completely worn out and went over to the defense. During this period the division returned to 33rd Guards Corps. From May 6–11 it took part, with the rest of 1st Ukrainian Front, in the final offensive on Prague.

== Postwar ==
At the time of the German surrender the division carried the official title 14th Guards Rifle, Vinnitsa, Order of Lenin, Order of the Red Banner, in the name of Jan Fabricius Division. [Russian: 14-я гвардейская стрелковая Винницкая ордена Ленина Краснознамённая дивизия имени Яна Фабрициуса.] As part of a postwar wave of decorations on May 28 the 36th Guards Regiment received the Order of Kutuzov, 3rd Degree for its part in the fighting around Cottbus. On June 4 the division as a whole was decorated with the Order of Kutuzov, 2nd Degree, for its part in the capture of Dresden. In July the division came under the command of Maj. Gen. V. A. Samsonov, who had led the 58th Rifle Division until being seriously wounded during the Berlin offensive. In the fall of the year the division was moved to Papa, Hungary, where it was disbanded in 1946.
