= Dmitry Zherebin =

Soviet colonel general

Dmitry Sergeyevich Zherebin
- Born: 23 February 1906; Izmaylovo, Pereslavsky Uyezd, Vladimir Governorate, Russian Empire
- Died: 27 June 1982 (aged 76) Moscow, Soviet Union
- Allegiance: Soviet Union
- Branch: Red Army (Soviet Army from 1946); Soviet Air Defense Forces
- Service years: 1923–1968
- Rank: Colonel general
- Commands: 96th Rifle Division; 58th Guards Rifle Division; 32nd Rifle Corps; Special Leningrad Air Defense Army (became 6th Separate Air Defense Army)
- Conflicts: Spanish Civil War; Battle of Lake Khasan; World War II
- Awards: Hero of the Soviet Union

Dmitry Sergeyevich Zherebin (Russian: Дмитрий Сергеевич Жеребин; 23 February 1906 – 27 June 1982) was a Soviet colonel general and a Hero of the Soviet Union who held corps and divisional commands during World War II.

An engineer officer, Zherebin took part in the Spanish Civil War as a military adviser and held senior staff positions in the prewar period, taking part in the Battle of Lake Khasan. After Germany invaded the Soviet Union, he continued to serve in the Soviet Far East and took command of the 96th Rifle Division in early 1942. Zherebin led the division in the Battle of Stalingrad and the 58th Guards Rifle Division in early 1943. Zherebin commanded the 32nd Rifle Corps from May 1943 to the end of the war, during the Soviet advance through Ukraine and into Romania and the Vistula–Oder offensive, and was made a Hero of the Soviet Union for his leadership of the corps in the Battle of Berlin. Postwar, he rose to senior roles and commanded the 6th Separate Air Defense Army of the Soviet Air Defense Forces.

== Early life and prewar service ==
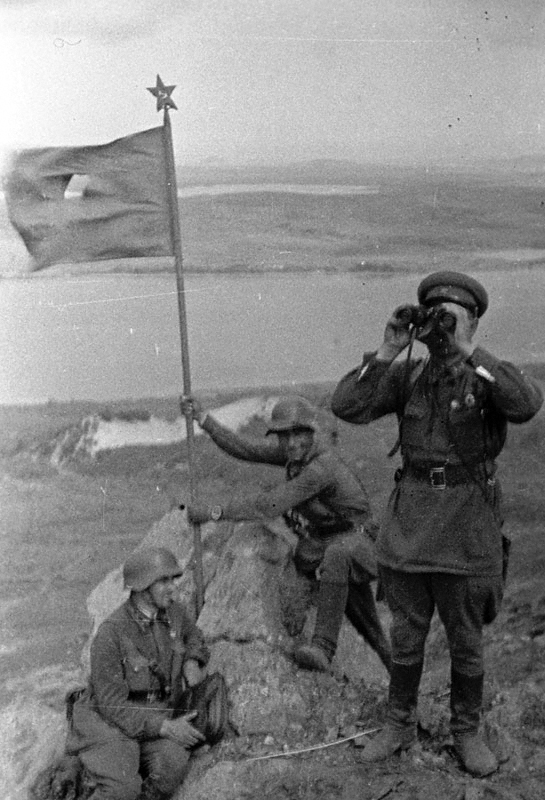
Zherebin (sitting) during the flag raising on Zaozernaya Hill during the Battle of Lake Khasan

Dmitry Sergeyevich Zherebin was born in a large peasant family on 23 February 1906 in the village of Izmaylovo, Pereslavsky Uyezd, Vladimir Governorate. His father was called up for military service during World War I and after a fire burned down their home, his mother was forced to move to her grandmother's home in Kirzhach to take care of the four sons and a daughter in the family. Zherebin spent his childhood and youth in the city of Zagorsk. On a Komsomol direction, he was sent to the Moscow Military Engineering School, entering it on 15 September 1923. Upon graduation in September 1927, Zherebin was appointed a platoon commander in the 10th Railroad Regiment of the Separate Red Banner Caucasus Army. He returned to the Moscow Military Engineering School in December 1930 to serve as a class commander. Zherebin entered the engineering department of the Military-Technical Academy for advanced training in September 1931, but only completed a year before being transferred to the command department of the Military Engineering Academy in May 1932. Upon graduation from the latter in May 1936, he was appointed chief of staff of the Separate Sapper Battalion of the Moscow Proletarian Rifle Division.

Zherebin was sent as a military advisor to the Spanish Republican Army during the Spanish Civil War between April 1937 and May 1938. For his performance in organizing engineer support for Spanish Republican forces, he was decorated with the Order of the Red Banner and the Medal "For Courage". On his return to the Soviet Union, he was posted to the Engineering Directorate of the Red Army as chief of the 3rd Section of the 2nd Department. In July Zherebin was sent to the headquarters of the Far Eastern Front, serving as chief of the 9th (Engineer) Department. In this role, he took part in the Battle of Lake Khasan, receiving a second Order of the Red Banner for his performance in organizing engineer support. Zherebin was one of the Soviet commanders featured in Viktor Tyomin's photograph of the flag raising on Zaozernaya Hill during the battle, published in the newspaper Pravda. After the end of hostilities, Zherebin served as chief of the 9th Department of the staff of the 1st Separate Red Banner Army from September 1938 and as chief of the Department of Fortified Regions of the front headquarters from November 1940.

== World War II ==
After Germany invaded the Soviet Union, Zherebin remained in the Far East, repeatedly requesting to be sent to the front. He was appointed deputy commander of the 12th Rifle Division of the 2nd Red Banner Army of the Far Eastern Front in December 1941, before rising to command the army's 96th Rifle Division in March 1942. The division was dispatched west to the Stalingrad Front in August, taking part in intense fighting for Serafimovich as part of the 21st Army. The Serafimovich bridgehead that the division fought for later became a vital jumping-off point for Operation Uranus. Zherebin was moved up to deputy chief of staff of the 21st Army for the auxiliary command post on 4 November. In this role, he took part in Operation Uranus and the destruction of the encircled German troops.

Zherebin was appointed commander of the 58th Guards Rifle Division on 9 January 1943, which he led as part of the 1st Guards Army in the offensive in the Donbass. Zherebin was promoted to major general on 29 January. He served as deputy chief of staff of the Southwestern Front from 2 April.

Zherebin took command of the 32nd Rifle Corps on 5 May 1943, commanding the formation for the rest of the war. He led the corps in the Donbass Strategic Offensive, the Nikopol–Krivoi Rog Offensive, the Uman–Botoșani offensive, Second Jassy–Kishinev offensive, the Warsaw–Poznan Offensive, the East Pomeranian Offensive, and the Berlin Offensive. During these operations the corps was assigned to the 3rd Guards Army, the 5th Guards Army, and the 5th Shock Army. For his performance in the Second Jassy–Kishinev offensive, Zherebin was awarded the Order of Kutuzov, 2nd class on 13 September 1944. The recommendation read:

Major General Zherebin finely organized the defense of the bridgehead in the region of Pugochen and Sherpen. During the period of its defense, he successfully repulsed a few attempts of the enemy to dislodge the corps from its bridgehead. He prepared the bridgehead in a through and detailed manner for the transition to the offensive. Operating swiftly and boldly on the night of 22–23 August the corps broke through the defenses of the enemy and by the end of the day, fighting their way up to 50 kilometers, the units of the corps entered Kishinev. Relentlessly developing the attack its forces joined battle to take Kishinev and persistently pursuing the enemy surrounded and wiped out his main forces on the east bank of the Prut. As a result, the corps destroyed and wounded more than 8,000 German soldiers and officers, taking up to 2,000 prisoner and capturing significant trophies. For successful leadership of the corps in the battles for Kishinev, he is deserving of the award of the Order of Kutuzov, 2nd class.

During the Warsaw–Poznan Offensive, the corps attacked out of the Magnuszew bridgehead on 14 January 1945 and broke through the German defenses, forcing a crossing of the Pilica. For his performance Zherebin was awarded the Order of Lenin on 25 March. The recommendation read:

Comrade Zherebin, during the period of preparation for the Warsaw–Poznan operation, thoroughly and painstakingly prepared his corps for the breakthrough of the German defense. He personally organized cooperation between infantry and reinforcements attached to the corps, going to the observation post of every rifle regiment and battalion.

On 14 January 1945, the corps of Comrade Zherebin broke through the strongly fortified enemy defense zone on the Magnuszew bridgehead and developing the success forced a crossing of the Pilica river, ensuring the timely commitment of the 2nd Guards Tank Army into the breakthrough.

During ten days of offensive operations the corps of Comrade Zherebin advanced up to 250 kilometers in fighting, destroying and capturing a great quantity of soldiers, officers and enemy equipment.

General Zherebin displayed great organizational abilities alongside personal courage and heroism during the operation.

He is worthy of the award of the Order of Lenin.

Between 30 January and 30 March 1945 Zherebin was credited with skillfully organizing the operations of the corps to take and expand a bridgehead on the left bank of the Oder river and the capture of Kustrin. From 16 April to 2 May the corps broke through a series of German defense positions and took the central part of Berlin. In the fighting, Zherebin was evaluated as follows: "he skillfully led the combat operations of the corps, maintained close cooperation of infantry with artillery, displayed courage and persistence, to fulfill the task to take Berlin." For his performance, Zherebin, promoted to lieutenant general on 20 April, received the title Hero of the Soviet Union on 29 May 1945. The recommendation read:

During the period from 7 March to 29 March 1945, commander of the 32nd Rifle Corps Lieutenant General Zherebin conducted two brilliant operations: the first to capture the city of Kustrin and the second to expand the bridgehead on the west bank of the Oder, northwest of Kustrin.

Comrade Zherebin thoroughly prepared the offensive on Kustrin, unexpectedly entering the city with the forces of five regiments, dividing the enemy group and cutting it off from the crossing, completely destroying and capturing it.

In the fighting for the city of Kustrin the 32nd Rifle Corps destroyed up to 4,00 and captured 3,500 soldiers and officers of the enemy, in addition to rich trophies.

Thanks to his bold maneuver and fine control of the battle a major group of the enemy, located in strongpoints (fortress) was eliminated with significantly few losses for our side.

Right after the capture of the city of Kustrin, Lieutenant General Zherebin rapidly and secretly crossed two divisions to the west bank of the Oder and with successful and decisive operations the corps expanded the bridgehead of the 5th Shock Army, linking it to the bridgehead of the 8th Guards Army, to create conditions for the offensive of major forces on Berlin.

During two days the 32nd Rifle Corps beat back a strong offensive of superior enemy forces, knocking out and destroying up to 70 tanks without surrendering a step of its positions.

During the period of the second operation, the corps took up to 2,000 enemy soldiers and officers prisoner.

In the Berlin operation, the 32nd Rifle Corps operated even more finely.

Breaking through several strong fortified lines, the units of the 32nd Rifle Corps burst into Berlin and after nine days of sustained fighting took its central part.

In this operation the units of the corps destroyed more than 5,500 and took 9,000 soldiers and officers prisoner.

Comrade Zherebin was always personally in the thick of the fighting, where he decided the sectors of the battle to ensure the success of the corps.

For taking Kustrin with small forces, creation of a powerful bridgehead on the Berlin axis and capturing the central part of Berlin, he is deserving of the title Hero of the Soviet Union.

== Postwar ==
After the end of the war, Zherebin continued to command the corps in the Group of Soviet Occupation Forces in Germany. He took a strict attitude towards breaches of discipline among his troops. In early 1946, Zherebin instituted patrols to arrest drunken soldiers in Ludwigslust in an attempt to curtail violence and public drunkenness among Soviet occupation troops in Germany. Graduating with honors from a special course at the Voroshilov Higher Military Academy between January 1947 and December 1948, he served as chief of the Operations Directorate and deputy chief of staff of the Moscow Military District from February 1949. Placed at the disposal of the 2nd Main Directorate of the Soviet General Staff in September 1950, he was dispatched a month later to serve as senior military adviser to the Chief of the General Staff of the Czechoslovak People's Army. Returning to the Soviet Union, Zherebin served as chief of the 2nd Sector of the 10th Directorate of the General Staff from March 1955 and in May 1956 became assistant chief of the Staff of the Combined Armed Forces of the Warsaw Pact and assistant chief of the 10th Directorate.

Zherebin was transferred to the Military Command Academy of the Air Defense Forces in February 1957, serving as chief of the operational art and tactics department and then as first deputy chief for training and chief of the academy training department from September 1958. In April 1959 he was appointed commander of the Special Leningrad Air Defense Army, which he continued to command after its reorganization into the 6th Separate Air Defense Army in February 1961. Promoted to colonel general on 9 May 1961, Zherebin's last assignment was as representative of the Supreme Commander of the Unified Armed Forces of the Warsaw Treaty Organization to the Polish Armed Forces from January 1962. Transferred to the reserve on 21 December 1968, Zherebin lived in Moscow, and was active in the veterans' organization of the 5th Shock Army. In poor health for several years, he died on 27 June 1982. He was buried in the Kuntsevo Cemetery.

== Awards ==
Zherebin was a recipient of the following awards and decorations:

- Hero of the Soviet Union
- Order of Lenin (3)
- Order of the Red Banner (5)
- Order of Suvorov, 2nd class
- Order of Kutuzov, 2nd class
- Order of Bogdan Khmelnitsky, 2nd class
- Medal "For Courage"
- Medal "For the Defence of Stalingrad"
- Medal "For the Victory over Germany in the Great Patriotic War 1941–1945"
- Medal "For the Capture of Berlin"
- Medal "For the Liberation of Warsaw"
- Virtuti Militari, 4th class (Poland)
- Order of Tudor Vladimirescu, 2nd class (Romania)

He was an honorary citizen of Kishinev and Serafimovich.
