= Mikhail Linnik =

Soviet Army captain

Mikhail Nikiforovich Linnik
- Михаил Никифорович Линник
- Born: 25 October 1916; Odessa, Russian Empire
- Died: 21 December 2007 (aged 91); Znamianka, Kirovohrad Oblast, Ukraine
- Military career
- Allegiance: Soviet Union
- Branch: Soviet Army
- Service years: 1938–1946
- Rank: Captain
- Unit: 96th Rifle Division
- Conflicts: World War II; Lublin-Brest Offensive
- Awards: Hero of the Soviet Union

Mikhail Nikiforovich Linnik (Russian: Михаил Никифорович Линник; 25 October 1916 – 21 December 2007) was a Soviet Army captain and Hero of the Soviet Union. Linnik was awarded the title Hero of the Soviet Union and the Order of Lenin for his actions during the Lublin–Brest Offensive in September 1944.

== Early life ==
Linnik was born on 25 October 1916 in Odessa in a Ukrainian worker's family. He lived in the Makarikha village and attended his local village school. In 1938, he graduated from the Znamianka Agricultural College. He then worked as an agronomist at the Krasny Partizan collective farm in Akimovka village in the Donetsk Oblast. In 1938, he was drafted into the Red Army.

== World War II ==
Linnik fought in World War II from July 1941 onwards. His unit was posted to the Southern Front until March 1942. In October, Linnik served with the 260th Rifle Division of the Don Front. By then, Linnik was a senior lieutenant, the deputy commander of a machine gun platoon in the division's 740th Separate School Rifle Battalion. In January 1943, students from the Moscow Infantry School were integrated into his battalion. Advancing behind tanks in combat formation, Linnik reportedly inspired the students to perform combat missions. In this attack, nine German bunkers, 6 antitank guns and 9 light machine guns were captured, and 34 German soldiers were reportedly killed. On 24 January, he captured a German machine gun and turned it on German troops, killing 32 and capturing 18. For this action, he was awarded the Order of Alexander Nevsky on 7 March. Linnik joined the Communist Party of the Soviet Union in the same year.

Linnik transferred units and became a company commander in the 2nd Rifle Battalion of the 96th Rifle Division's 350th Rifle Regiment. In 1944, Linnik fought in the Operation Bagration. During the Soviet breakthrough in Polesia Region between 25 and 27 June, his company reportedly was first to break through German defences, making it possible to expand the bridgehead and move the rest of the battalion forward. Linnik's company also reportedly repulsed German counterattacks. He reportedly personally killed 9 German soldiers in this action. For his leadership, Linnik was recommended for the Order of the Patriotic War 1st class but was instead awarded the Order of the Red Banner on 8 July.

During the advance near Pukhavichy in July, the battalion was nearly cut off from the rest of the regiment during a German battalion-sized counterattack. When the German troops attacked, Linnik led his company forward and reportedly scattered the German battalion. Linnik himself reportedly killed 20 Germans. The counterattack was repulsed, enabling the regiment to continue pursuit. On 4 September, retreating German troops entrenched at the Narew. Linnik as part of his unit crossed the Narew at Różan and joined the battle for the expansion of the bridgehead. The German troops launched a determined offensive supported by tanks and artillery, attempting to drive the Soviet troops back into the river. Linnik's battalion commander was wounded and Linnik took command. The battalion reportedly repulsed German attacks, and eventually forced the German troops to retreat. Linnik was himself wounded but reportedly did not leave the battlefield. For his actions, Linnik was awarded the title Hero of the Soviet Union and the Order of Lenin on 24 March 1945.

== Postwar ==
Linnik was discharged in 1946. He lived in Znamianka. Between 1949 and 1957, he conducted party work. On 11 March 1985, he was awarded the Order of the Patriotic War 1st class on the 40th anniversary of the end of World War II. Linnik died on 21 December 2007 and was buried in Znamianka.
