= Pyotr Malyshev =

Soviet Army lieutenant general

Pyotr Fyodorovich Malyshev
- Malyshev, c. 1945
- Born: 28 August 1898; Seleznevo, Pereslavsky Uyezd, Vladimir Governorate, Russian Empire
- Died: 10 December 1972 (aged 74) Moscow, Soviet Union
- Allegiance: Russian Empire; Russian SFSR; Soviet Union
- Branch: Imperial Russian Army; Red Army (later Soviet Army)
- Service years: 1917–1918, 1919–1937, 1940–1959
- Rank: Lieutenant general
- Commands: 217th Rifle Division; 8th Guards Rifle Corps; 4th Shock Army
- Conflicts: World War I; Russian Civil War; Polish–Soviet War; World War II
- Awards: Order of Lenin (2); Order of the Red Banner (3)

Pyotr Fyodorovich Malyshev (Russian: Пётр Фёдорович Ма́лышев; 28 August 1898 – 10 December 1972) was a Soviet Army lieutenant general who held field army command during World War II.

== Early life, World War I, and Russian Civil War ==
Pyotr Fyodorovich Malyshev was born on 28 August 1898 in the village of Seleznevo, Kopninskoy volost, Pereslavsky Uyezd, Vladimir Governorate (now Pereslavsky District, Yaroslavl Oblast). He studied at the Petrovskoy Teacher Seminary from October 1913 to January 1917. During World War I, Malyshev entered the Alexandrovskоye Military School as a junker on 4 February 1917, taking a course in the special machine-gun section of the school. On 17 March he took the oath of allegiance to the Russian Provisional Government, and on 26 May he received the rank of unter-ofitser. After graduating from the school, Malyshev was promoted to praporshchik with seniority on 1 June and placed on the rolls of the 197th Reserve Infantry Regiment as a junior officer of the 14th company. In August he was sent to the Northwestern Front, where he served as chief of the machine gun detachment of the 480th Danilovsky Infantry Regiment of the 120th Infantry Division. Demobilized, Malyshev began work as an assistant ticket clerk at the Berendeyevo station of the Yaroslavl railway in February 1918.

During the Russian Civil War, Malyshev joined the Red Army in March 1919 and was sent to the 7th Rifle Division, with which he served as chief of the machine gun detachment of the 30th and 58th Rifle Regiments. The division was sent to the Eastern Front with the 2nd Army, fighting against the forces of Kolchak in battles in the Votkinsk area and in the capture of Votkinsk and Izhevsk. In the summer of 1919 the division was sent to the Southern Front, where it fought in battles against the Armed Forces of South Russia in the area of Oboyan and Sudzha. In the fall the division fought in the Orel–Kursk operation and the capture of Dmitrovsk, and in January 1920 in the suppression of anti-Soviet resistance in the area of Glukhov, Putivyl, and Konotop. In April Malyshev was appointed assistant commander for personnel of the 58th Rifle Regiment, fighting in the Polish–Soviet War on the Western Front, then in the suppression of the forces of Stanisław Bułak-Bałachowicz in the area of Ovruch and the Makhnovists in Poltava Governorate. For distinguishing himself in battle, Malyshev was awarded the Order of the Red Banner in May 1920.

== Interwar period ==
After the end of the war, Malyshev continued to serve with the 7th Rifle Division of the Ukrainian Military District at Chernigov and Nezhin as assistant commander for personnel of the 58th Rifle Regiment, battalion commander in the 20th Rifle Regiment, chief of the divisional school for junior commanders, from October 1924 as assistant chief of the operations section of the division staff, from April 1926 as assistant commander for logistical support of the 19th Rifle Regiment, and from October 1927 as chief of the operations section of the division staff. During this period, Malyshev completed the Vystrel course between August 1922 and September 1923, and together with the division fought in the suppression of anti-Soviet forces in Ukraine during 1926 and 1927. In August 1929 he returned to the Vystrel course and upon graduation in May 1930 returned to the division, now in the Volga Military District.

Malyshev served as chief of staff of the division until April 1931, when he transferred to the 34th Rifle Division as its assistant chief of staff. In March 1934 he was appointed commander of the 210th Rifle Regiment of the 70th Rifle Division, and graduated from the correspondence department of the Frunze Military Academy in 1935. Malyshev was arrested in June 1937 during the Great Purge, dismissed from the army, and placed under investigation. He was released in February 1940, reinstated in the army and placed at the disposal of the Red Army Personnel Directorate while awaiting assignment. In April he was appointed deputy commander of the 64th Rifle Division of the Kalinin Military District, which was transferred to the Western Special Military District. In early June 1941 he transferred to command the 3rd Reserve Rifle Brigade at Smolensk.

== World War II ==
After Operation Barbarossa began on 22 June, Malyshev continued to command the brigade. On 13 July he was appointed commander of the 64th Rifle Division, but did not take command of the unit and was tasked with defending the city of Smolensk as head of the city garrison. After the city fell to the German advance, Malyshev was arrested and placed under investigation until March 1942, when he was released for lack of evidence and placed at the disposal of the Military Council of the Western Front. Malyshev was appointed deputy commander of the 238th Rifle Division on 20 April 1942 but did not actually take this position and instead took temporary command of the 217th Rifle Division on 3 May. He led the 217th in defending positions on the east bank of the Ugra near Pavlovo as part of the 49th Army of the front. On 20 August the division handed over its sector to the 194th Rifle Division and joined the 16th Army. Having marched to the Sukhinichi region, its units entered defensive battles against the attacks of the German 134th Infantry Division and 17th Panzer Division, tasked with eliminating the threat of the German advance on Kozelsk and Sukhinichi. By decisive actions, they inflicted heavy losses on the German forces and drove them back to the southern bank of the Zhizdra.

In October Malyshev was transferred to serve as deputy commander of the 16th Army, during which it fought in heavy defensive battles on the left wing of the Western Front in the area of Sukhinichi. From 3 May 1943 Malyshev was appointed temporary commander of the 8th Guards Rifle Corps. With the 11th Guards Army, the corps fought in the Orel Offensive Operation, the Bryansk offensive, and the Gorodok Offensive, capturing Karachev and Gorodok. For "skillful command" of the corps in these operations Malyshev was awarded the Order of Lenin on 27 August.

Malyshev commanded the 4th Shock Army from 30 December 1943 to the end of the war. Its troops entered the region southwest of Vitebsk by the end of 1943, where they went on the defensive. In summer 1944 the army fought in the recapture of Belorussia and the drive into the Baltics. Malyshev especially distinguished himself in his leadership of the army during the Polotsk offensive. Acting on the main direction of the 1st Baltic Front, the troops of the army broke through German fortified defenses, destroyed elements of the German 16th Army and reached the area northwest of Polotsk. In the second half of 1944 the army as part of the 2nd and 1st Baltic Fronts fought in the Rezhitsa–Dvinsk offensive, the Riga offensive, and the Memel Offensive, and subsequently blockaded the Courland Pocket until the end of the war.

== Postwar ==
After the end of the war, Malyshev was placed at the disposal of the Main Personnel Directorate in October 1945. After completing the Higher Academic Course at the Voroshilov Higher Military Academy between March 1946 and June 1947, Malyshev was appointed assistant commander-in-chief of the Belorussian Military District for personnel. He served as chief of staff and first deputy commander-in-chief of the district from November 1948. Malyshev transferred to hold the same position for the East Siberian Military District in March 1950 and the South Ural Military District in July 1953. He was again placed at the disposal of the Main Personnel Directorate in September 1954, then appointed deputy commander-in-chief of the Volga Military District for air defense in January 1955. Malyshev retired on 4 March 1959 and died in Moscow on 10 December 1972.

== Awards ==
Malyshev was a recipient of the following decorations:

- Order of Lenin (2)
- Order of the Red Banner (3)
- Order of Kutuzov, 1st class
- Order of Suvorov, 2nd class (2)
- Order of the Red Star
- Medals
- Foreign orders
