= Trofim Kolomiets =

Soviet Army general (1894–1971)

- Born: September 16, 1894; Elisavetgrad, Russian Empire
- Died: April 1971 (aged 76) Volgograd, Soviet Union
- Allegiance: Russian Empire; Soviet Union
- Branch: Imperial Russian Army; Soviet Red Army
- Rank: lieutenant general
- Commands: 32nd Rifle Corps; 25th Rifle Division; 51st Army; 54th Rifle Corps
- Conflicts: World War I; Russian Civil War; World War II; Eastern Front; Operation Barbarossa; Battle of Smolensk; Battle of Stalingrad

Trofim Kalinovich Kolomiets (Russian: Трофим Калинович Коломиец; Ukrainian: Трохим Калинович Коломієць, romanized: Trokhym Kalynovych Kolomiets 1894 – April 1971) was a Soviet Army commander.

== Biography ==
Kolomiets was born in Elisavetgrad, in the Kherson Governorate of the Russian Empire (present-day Ukraine). He fought in the Imperial Russian Army during World War I before joining the Red Army in the Russian Civil War. At the beginning of the Great Patriotic War, he was a major general. He fought against the forces of the Axis powers at Smolensk in 1941.

He was then assigned in July 1941 to the defence of Crimea as deputy commander of the 51st Army, of which he became commander in July 1942 shortly after the defeat in the Battle of the Kerch Peninsula against Manstein's troops. The remnants of Kolomiets' army were evacuated to the Kuban and assigned to the North Caucasus Front and then, from 1 August 1942, to the southern flank of the Stalingrad Front, which became the Southern eastern front on 6 August 1942.

Unable to stop the momentum of the 4th Panzer Army, he was demoted in October 1942 to become commander of the 54th Rifle Corps. He participated in this position in operations on the Mious, Donbass, around Melitopol, Belarus and East Prussia.
