= Sandomierz–Silesian offensive =

The Sandomierz–Silesian offensive was part of the Soviet Vistula–Oder offensive (12 January – 3 February 1945) during World War II. It was carried out by the 1st Ukrainian Front under Ivan Konev, aiming to destroy German troops in southern Poland, reach the Oder and capture a bridgehead on the west bank of the Oder.

The 1st Front began its offensive on 12 January, starting from the Sandomierz bridgehead. Within 6 days the 1st Front has broken through the German front on the length of 250km and advanced from 120km to 150km; near the end of the offensive the Soviets have approached Breslau (Wrocław) and begun crossing of the Oder (Odra) river.

== Background ==
At the end of 1944, troops of the 1st Ukrainian Front took a line along the right bank of the Vistula and on the Sandomierz bridgehead.

The attacking Soviet force from Ivan Konev's 1st Ukrainian Front mustered 1,830,800 million men, 3,244 tanks and self-propelled guns, more than 13,000 guns and mortars, and 2,582 aircraft. The front consisted of the 6th, 3rd Guards, 13th, 52nd, 5th Guards, 60th, 21st, and 59th Armies, the 4th Tank Army, the 3rd Guards Tank Army, and the 2nd Air Army. Additional mobile forces were the 4th Guards, 25th, and 31st Tank Corps, the 1st Guards Cavalry Corps, and the 7th Guards Mechanized Corps.

The defending German troops consisted of the 4th Panzer Army and 17th Army of Josef Harpe's Army Group A, totaling 257,000 men, 540 tanks and assault guns, more than 2,700 guns and mortars, supported by about than 300 aircraft of elements of Luftflotte 6. Seeking to hold the military industrial region of Silesia, the German command created a strong defense consisting of five defensive lines with a combined depth of up to 350 km on the Sandomierz-Breslau axis. The majority of these lines ran along the Nida, Pilica, Varta and Oder rivers.

The plan for the operation provided for a powerful cutting strike from the Sandomierz bridgehead towards Breslau with simultaneous encirclement of the German troops in cooperation with the 1st Belorussian and 4th Ukrainian Fronts on the adjacent wings, and their piecemeal destruction. Subsequently, the front was slated to reach the line of Pietrkow, Radomsko, Częstochowa, and Bochnia by the tenth and eleventh days of the offensive and then advance on Breslau.

The first echelon of the front consisted of Vladimir Gluzdovsky's 6th Army, Vasily Gordov's 3rd Guards Army, Nikolai Pukhov's 13th Army, Konstantin Koroteyev's 52nd Army, Aleksey Zhadov's 5th Guards Army, and Pavel Kurochkin's 60th Army. In the second echelon were Dmitry Gusev's 21st Army and Ivan Korovnikov's 59th Army. The front mobile group consisted of Dmitry Lelyushenko's 4th Tank Army and Pavel Rybalko's 3rd Guards Tank Army. The 1st Guards Cavalry and 7th Guards Mechanized Corps were part of the reserve. Air support for the front was provided by Stepan Krasovsky's 2nd Air Army.

The 13th, 52nd and 5th Guards Armies were tasked with the main assault towards Chmielnik, Radomsko and Breslau. The 4th Tank Army and 3rd Guards Tank Army were slated to be committed in this sector on the first day to exploit the anticipated breakthrough. The 3rd Guards and 6th Armies were tasked with operating in cooperation with the 1st Belorussian Front to encircle and destroy the Ostrowiec grouping of German troops. The 60th Army had the task of taking Kraków with its main forces and part of the neighboring 59th Army. The main forces of the 59th Army were tasked with advancing to the west to cover the main attack group of the front from possible counterattacks from the southwest, while the 21st Army was assigned to strengthen the efforts on the main axis.

== Offensive ==
The offensive began on 12 January with the assault of the 1st Ukrainian Front strike group. A powerful artillery preparation with a density of 250 guns and mortars per kilometer in the breakthrough sector ensued a rapid attack of infantry and tanks with infantry riders. The German attempts to resist were broken by the tank corps, committed to finish the breakthrough of the main defensive line. In the second half of the day the tank armies were committed to the battle. Their forward detachments rushed into the German rear, continuing the offensive at night, but the main forces were unable to move around the infantry in the darkness and only entered the battle on the next morning. Attempting to cut the tank armies off from the rest of the front, the Germans counterattacked with the XXIV Panzer Corps. In an intense meeting engagement near Kielce the 4th Tank Army and 13th Army encircled and by the end of 15 January destroyed the XXIV Panzer Corps. During this period the front's main forces, with the 3rd Guards Tank Army in front, burst forward and forced a crossing of the Pilica on the march. The forces of the right wing, detained by the repulse of the counterattack, did not manage to encircle the German troops around Ostrowiec, who retreated to the west. On the left wing the 60th Army, together with the 59th Army, committed on 14 January, reached Krakow. By the end of 17 January the German defense was broken through on a 250 km front to a depth of 120 to 140 km. The troops of the front destroyed the main forces of the 4th Panzer Army and in cooperation with the 4th Ukrainian Front defeated the 17th Army, reaching the initial objectives four to five days early.

Stavka modified the objectives for the operation on 17 January, with the main forces to continue the drive on Breslau and no later than 22 January take Krakow, and, outflanking the Silesian industrial zone, advance to the Oder. The 59th and 60th Armies took Krakow on 19 January, and outflanking the cities of the industrial zone from the north, continued the offensive, meeting increasing German resistance. To break the stiffening German resistance, the 21st Army was committed on 19 January. Breaking through the German defenses on the Warta, the army led the offensive on the Silesian industrial zone, outflanking it from the northwest. The 1st Guards Cavalry Corps was simultaneously committed to action. To accelerate the advance of the 5th Guards and 52nd Armies to the Oder, on Konev's order the 3rd Guards Tank Army struck along the east bank of the river, taking Oppeln on 24 January and cut off the German retreat. The troops of the 5th Guards Army reached the Oder on 22 January and those of the 52nd followed on the next day. They forced crossings of the Oder south of Breslau and to the north and south of Oppeln, capturing small bridgeheads.

The struggle for the Silesian industrial zone, defended by nine infantry and two panzer divisions, two brigades, and more than 30 separate units, developed in the following days. By 23 January the right flank units of the 21st Army reached the Oder south of Oppeln, and its left flank units took Tarnowskie Góry. The forces of the 59th Army reached the line east of Sosnowiec, and the 60th Army outflanked the Silesian grouping from the south. On 25 January the 3rd Guards Tank Army and 1st Guards Cavalry Corps struck towards Gross-Strelitz and enveloped the German grouping from the west, threatening encirclement. In order to avoid significant losses and preserve the key industrial facilities of Sileia, Soviet forces left a small corridor for the encircled troops, through which they retreated to the southwest. On 29 January the Silesian industrial region was fully cleared of German troops, who were subsequently destroyed in the forests to the southwest.

The main forces of the front, advancing towards Breslau, reached the Oder from Koben to Oppeln between 22 and 25 January, forced crossings of the river in several places, and captured bridgeheads to the north and south of Breslau. By the end of 3 February they reached a line to the west of Unruhstadt, Steinau, east of Breslau, Olau, east of Ratibor, northeast of Strumen, consolidated on it, and began preparing for the Lower Silesian offensive.

== Aftermath and results ==
As a result of the offensive, the forces of the 1st Ukrainian Front destroyed the German 4th Panzer Army and main forces of the 17th Army, advanced 400 km to the west, and in cooperation with the 1st Belorussian and 4th Ukrainian Fronts liberated the southern regions of Poland, seized the Silesian industrial zone, entered German territory, and created conditions for the conduct of subsequent operations on the Berlin and Dresden axes through the creation of bridgeheads on the west bank of the Oder. During the 23 days of the operation, the forces of the front defeated 21 infantry and five tank divisions and a significant quantity of separate units. According to Soviet official figures, 150,000 German soldiers were killed and 43,000 taken prisoner. Among the captured weaponry were 5,000 guns and mortars, more than 300 tanks and 200 aircraft. Soviet losses included 26,000 killed and 89,500 wounded.

== Sources ==
- Kiselyov, V. N. (2003). "Сандомирско-Силезская операция 1945" [Sandomierz–Silesian operation 1945]. In Ivanov, Sergei (ed.). Военная энциклопедия в 8 томах [Military Encyclopedia in 8 volumes] (in Russian). Vol. 7. Moscow: Voenizdat. pp. 373–374. ISBN 5-203-01874-X.
- Sims, D and Schilling, A. Breakout from the Sandomierz Bridgehead, Field Artillery, Oct 1990
- Henryk Stańczyk, Operacja sandomiersko-śląska 1 Frontu Ukraińskiego. Bitwa o Górny Śląsk, Warszawa, WIH:Historia Militaris Polonica, 1996, ISBN 83-86213-29-9
- (in Polish) Wiślańsko-odrzańska operacja, Encyklopedia WIEM
