= Ivan Shepetov =

Soviet general (1902–1943)

Ivan Mikhailovich Shepetov
- Born: 11 July 1902; Kamenskoye, Yekaterinoslav Governorate, Russian Empire (now Dniprodzerzhynsk, Ukraine)
- Died: 21 May 1943 (aged 40); Flossenbürg concentration camp, Germany
- Military career
- Allegiance: Soviet Union
- Branch: Red Army
- Service years: 1918–1942
- Rank: Major-general
- Commands: 96th Mountain Rifle Division (March 1941 – May 1942)
- Conflicts: World War II
- Awards: Hero of the Soviet Union

Ivan Mikhailovich Shepetov (Russian: Иван Михайлович Шепетов; 11 July 1902 – 21 May 1943) was a Soviet infantry officer who enlisted in the Red Army as a Civil War volunteer in 1918 and rose to command the 96th Mountain Rifle Division in the months following the German invasion of the Soviet Union.

== World War II ==
Promoted to major-general and awarded the title Hero of the Soviet Union in autumn 1941 for his capable handling of the 96th Mountain Rifle Division on the Southwestern Front, Shepetov continued to command the division (redesignated as the 14th Guards Rifle Division) until 29 May 1942, when he was wounded and taken prisoner in the German encirclement near the town of Izyum.

Transferred between various prisoner camps after falling into German hands, Shepetov was shot while attempting to escape from the Flossenbürg concentration camp in May 1943.

Surviving Soviet war prisoners held at Flossenbürg stated that they had witnessed Shepetov's torture at Flossenbürg in the spring of 1943.
