= Vasyl Skopenko =

Hero of the Soviet Union (1912–1945)

- Василь Скопенко
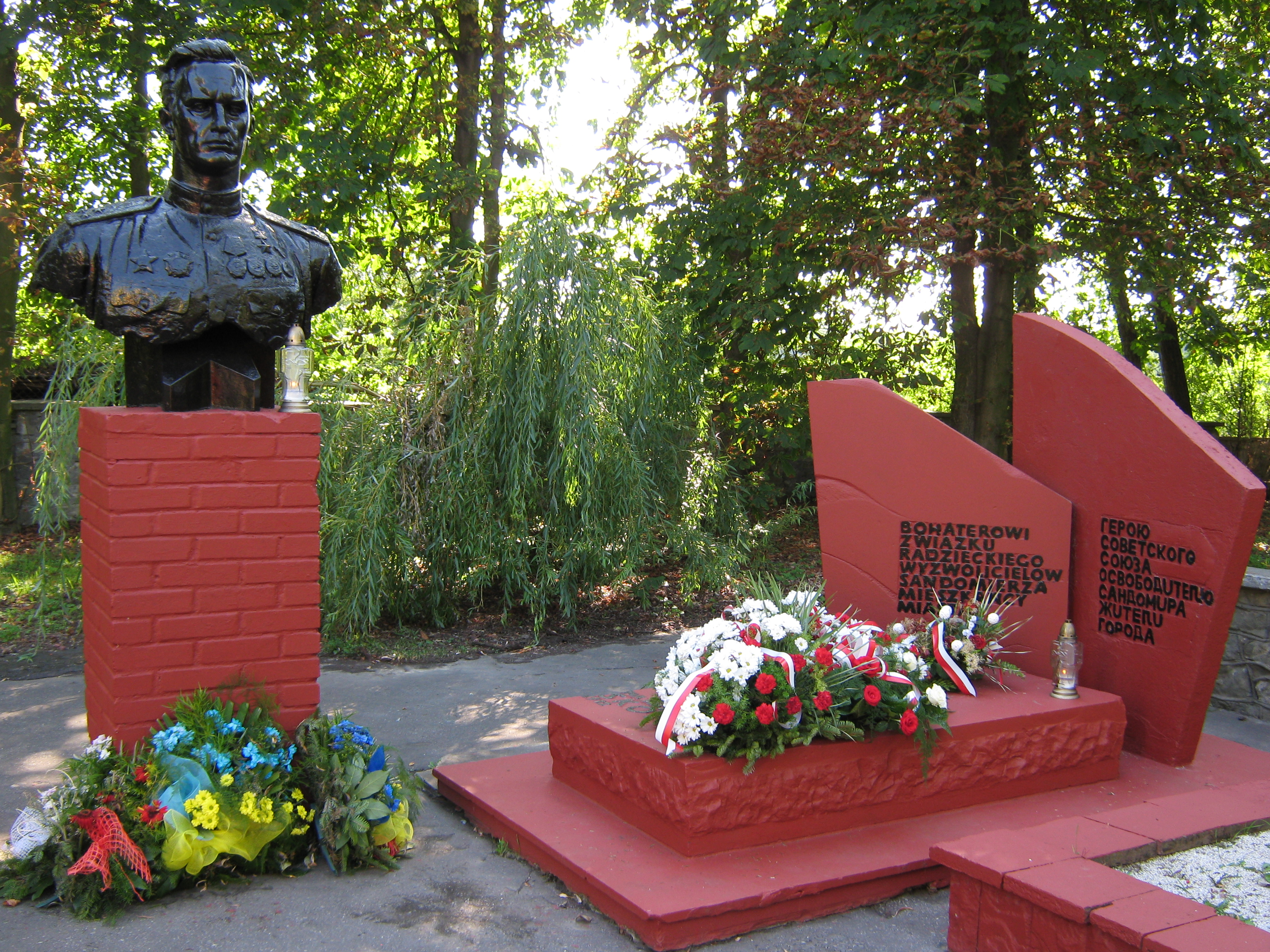
- Skopenko's grave on the graveyard of the Red Army in Sandomierz
- Born: January 14, 1912
- Died: January 27, 1945 (aged 33)
- Resting place: Sandomierz
- Citizenship: Soviet Union
- Education: Kryvyi Rih Pedagogical Institute Odesa University
- Known for: Crossing of the Vistula river
- Partner: Hanna Mytrofanivna Skopenko
- Children: 3
- Parent: Fyodor Ivanovych Skopenko Tetyana Yosypivna Skopenko
Awards
Hero of the Soviet Union
Order of Lenin

Vasyl Fedorovych Skopenko (Ukrainian: Василь Федорович Скопенко, 14 January 1912 – 27 January 1945) was a Ukrainian secondary school teacher and principal, lieutenant colonel, participant in the Soviet-Finnish war and the World War II. Was awarded a Hero of the Soviet Union.

== Biography ==
Born on 14 January 1912 in the village of Struhivka, which belonged to the Suraz district of then Chernihiv Governorate (now the Bryansk Oblast of the Russian Federation). Skopenko's father Fyodor Ivanovych worked at the Rostov mine, and mother Tetyana Yosypivna worked as a cook in the mining artillery.

After graduating from high school, Skopenko studied at a mining school, then worked as a mining foreman at the Karl Liebknecht mine in Kryvyi Rih. Then he studied at the Faculty of Physics and Mathematics of Odesa University.

In 1935, after graduating from the Kryvyi Rih Pedagogical Institute, Skopenko was sent to the Verblyuz village school of Novgorodkivskyi district, Kirovohrad Oblast. He worked there as a physics teacher, and in 1937 became the school principal. For the work in 1939, he was awarded the "For labor distinction" medal.

On 15 March 1939 Skopenko was mobilized into the Red Army, where he took part in the Soviet-Finnish war of 1939-1940.

=== Military ===
Skopenko graduated the Frunze Military Academy in 1943. He became a commander of the 1180th Rifle Regiment (350th Rifle Division, 13th Army, 1st Ukrainian Front).

Under Skopenko's leadership, the regiment crossed the Vistula river in the area of the settlement of Lonjakh, Poland using improvised means. After performing a circling maneuver, Sandomir was freed from the German troops, thereby creating a bridgehead for the further advance of the Soviets.

By decree of the Presidium of the Supreme Soviet of the USSR dated 23 September 1944, for the "exemplary performance" of the combat tasks of the command on the front of the "struggle against the German-fascist invaders" while demonstrating "courage and heroism at the same time", Lieutenant Colonel Vasyl Fedorovych Skopenko was awarded the title of Hero of the Soviet Union with the award of the Order of Lenin and the Gold Star medal (No. 4589). On 24 January 1945 he received the rank of colonel.

On 27 January 1945 Skopenko was mortally wounded in a battle near the city of Wrocław. While dying in the hospital, he ordered to be buried in Sandomierz.

In February 1945, Skopenko's body was transported to the city and buried on Rynok Square. The city authorities honored his memory at a special session.

== Family ==
- Wife: Anna Mytrofanivna;
- Daughter: Alla Pasko;
- Sons: Heorhiy Skopenko and Victor Skopenko, who became a rector of the Kyiv University.

== Awards ==
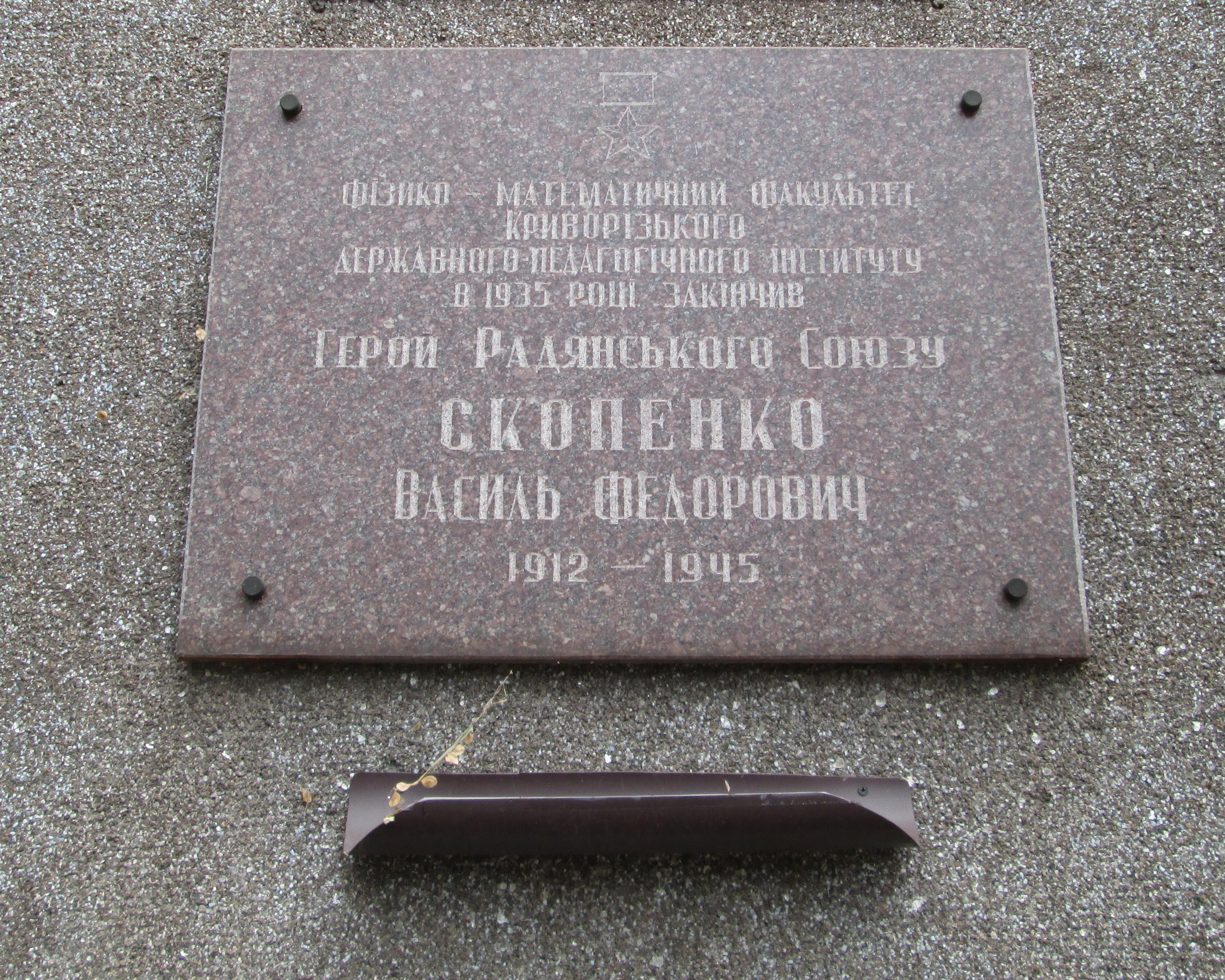
Skopenko's name on the memory board in Kryvyi Rih

- Order of Lenin;
- 2 Orders of the Red Banner;
- Order of Alexander Nevskiy;
- Order of the Patriotic War 1st level;
- Order of the Red Star.

== Legacy ==
In the 1950s, Opatovska Street was renamed Skopenka Street (as of now the previous name was returned). A monument was erected near Opatovska Brama. In 1990, Skopenko's remains were reburied at the military cemetery of Soviet soldiers (near Mickiewicz Street), and the monument was also moved there.

Skopenko's name is engraved on the "wall of heroes" memory board in Kryvyi Rih.
