= 96th Rifle Division =

- Active: 1923–1993
- Disbanded: 1993
- Country: Soviet Union
- Branch: Red Army
- Garrison/HQ: Kazan
- Engagements: Soviet invasion of Poland

Commanders
- Notable commanders: Pavel Belov; Ivan Shepetov; Grigory Khalyuzin

The 96th Rifle Division, also designated the 96th Mountain Division, was a division of the Red Army, active from 1923.

== First formation ==
In December 1923, in the Ukrainian Military District in Vinnytsia the 96th Podolsky Territorial Rifle Division was formed. In 1924, the division became part of the 17th Rifle Corps. On 29 July 1927 the honorary title changed to "Vinnytsia".

On 1 September 1929 it was named JF Fabricius (ru:Фабрициус, Ян Фрицевич) The full name of the division was now the 96th Rifle Division Vinnytsia named for JF Fabricius. In 1931, the division was transferred to cadre status.

On 17 May 1935 the division as part of 17th RC joined the Kiev Military District.

On 26 July 1938 the 96th Rifle Division, 17th RC, joined the Vinnytsia army group formed in the Kiev Special Military District.

On 16 September 1939 the headquarters of the Vinnytsia Army Group was renamed Headquarters Volotchisk Army Group with headquarters in Volochisk. The 96th Rifle Division (17th RC) became part of this group.

From 17 September 1939 the division took part in the Soviet invasion of Poland.

It was converted to a rifle division in October 1941. Became 14th Guards Rifle Division January 1942.

== Second creation ==
The division was recreated in July 1942 and fought at Stalingrad. It became the 68th Guards Rifle Division in February 1943.

== Third creation ==
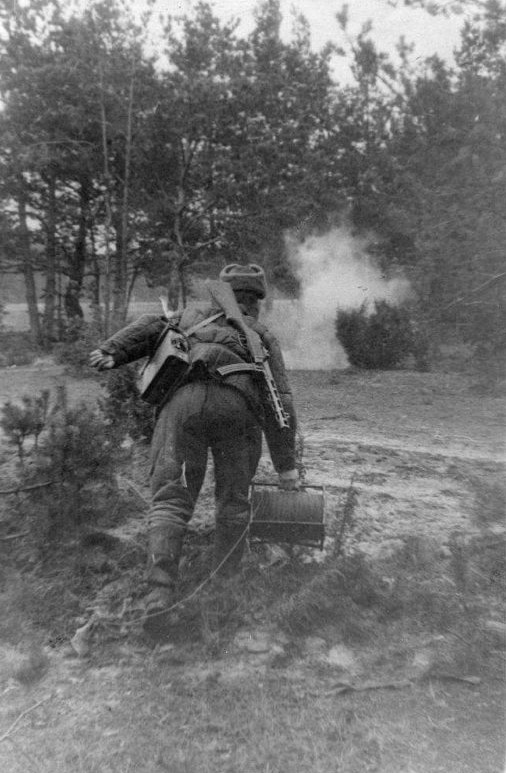
A soldier of the division's separate signals battalion laying down telephone cable under fire during the East Prussian Offensive, 20 February 1945

The 96th Rifle Division was recreated at Tula in March 1943. In mid July 1943 it was part of the 11th Army. During the Lublin-Brest Offensive, 350th Rifle Regiment company commander Mikhail Linnik distinguished himself and was subsequently awarded the title Hero of the Soviet Union. The division fought in Belorussia, East Prussia, and near Berlin (Battle of Berlin). With 48th Army of the 3rd Belorussian Front May 1945.

In 1957 the division became the 96th Motor Rifle Division. From 1957 to 1989 it was served in the Volga Military District, with its headquarters at Kazan, and the headquarters was set up in the Kazan Kremlin at some point. In 1989 the division became the 5509th Base for Storage of Weapons and Equipment. The storage base disbanded in 1993.
