= Budarino =

Budarino Бударино
- Selo
- Location within Astrakhan Oblast Location within Russia
- Coordinates: 45°42′N 47°24′E
- Country: Russia
- Region: Astrakhan Oblast
- District: Limansky District
- Time zone: UTC+4:00

Budarino (Russian: Бударино) is a rural locality (a selo) and the administrative center of Budarinsky Selsoviet, Limansky District, Astrakhan Oblast, Russia. The population was 591 as of 2010. There are 11 streets.

== Geography ==
Budarino is located 24 km southeast of Liman (the district's administrative centre) by road. Dalneye is the nearest rural locality.
