= Aleksikovsky =

Aleksikovsky Алексиковский
- Khutor
- Location within Volgograd Oblast Location within Russia
- Coordinates: 50°56′N 42°19′E
- Country: Russia
- Region: Volgograd Oblast
- District: Novonikolayevsky District
- Time zone: UTC+4:00

Aleksikovsky (Russian: Алексиковский) is a rural locality (a khutor) and the administrative center of Aleksikovskoye Rural Settlement, Novonikolayevsky District, Volgograd Oblast, Russia. The population was 1,537 as of 2010. There are 29 streets.

== Geography ==
Aleksikovsky is located in forest steppe, on the Khopyorsko-Buzulukskaya Plain, 6 km southwest of Novonikolayevsky (the district's administrative centre) by road. Novonikolayevsky is the nearest rural locality.
