= Strusivka =

Strusivka Струсівка
- Village
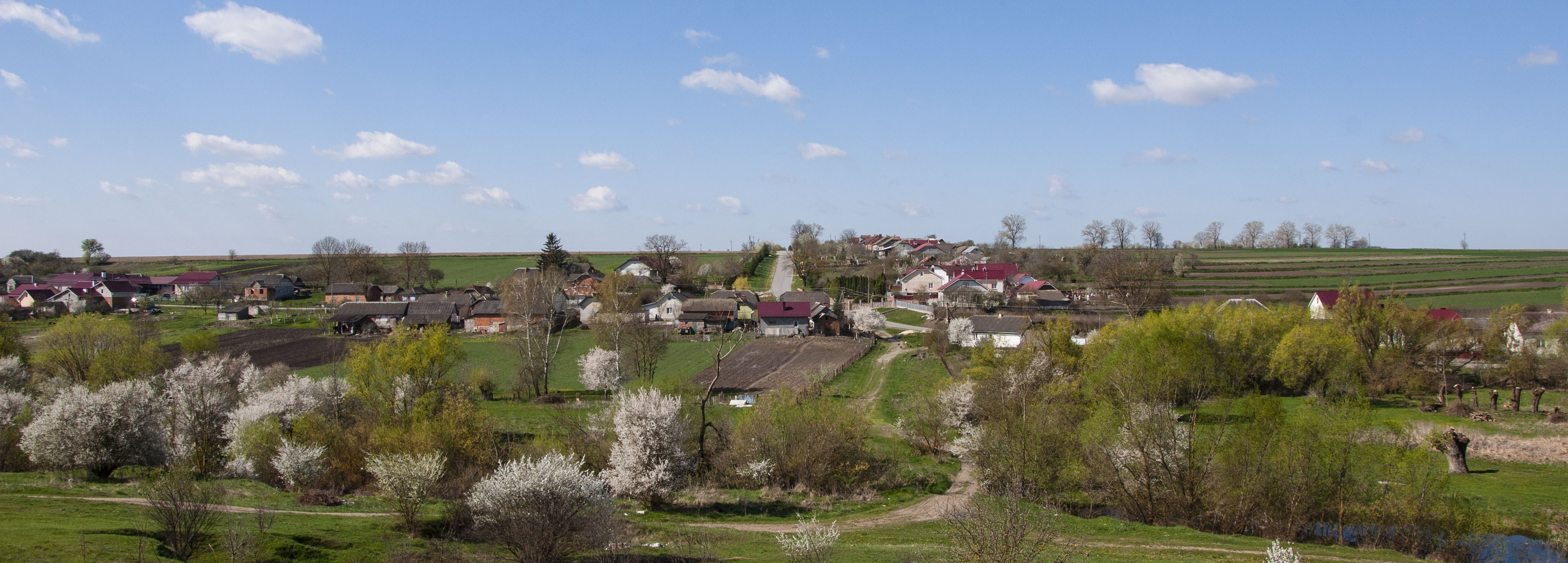

- Location within Ternopil Oblast
- Coordinates: 48°59′10″N 25°55′33″E
- Country: Ukraine
- Oblast: Ternopil Oblast
- Raion: Chortkiv Raion

Strusivka (Ukrainian: Струсівка; Polish: Strusówka) is a former village in Ukraine, that is now a street of the same name in the village of Shmankivtsi, Chortkiv Raion, Ternopil Oblast, Ukraine.

== Toponymy ==
The name has an anthroponymic origin, i.e. the name originated from a personal name. It is possible that Strus was a representative of the branch of the Polish nobility Strus.

== History ==
Emerged in the early XVIII century.

== Religion ==
In the village there was a wooden church of John the Baptist (wooden, lost).

== Sources ==
- "Strosówka". Geographical Dictionary of the Kingdom of Poland (in Polish). 11. Warszawa: Kasa im. Józefa Mianowskiego. 1890. p. 409.
- Strusivka (Strosivka) // Chortkiv district. Historical and memoir collection / ed. board of O. Sonevytska and others. - Paris - Sydney - Toronto: NTSh, Ukrainian Archives, 1974. - Vol. XXVII. - S. 232.
