= Sandomierz bridgehead =

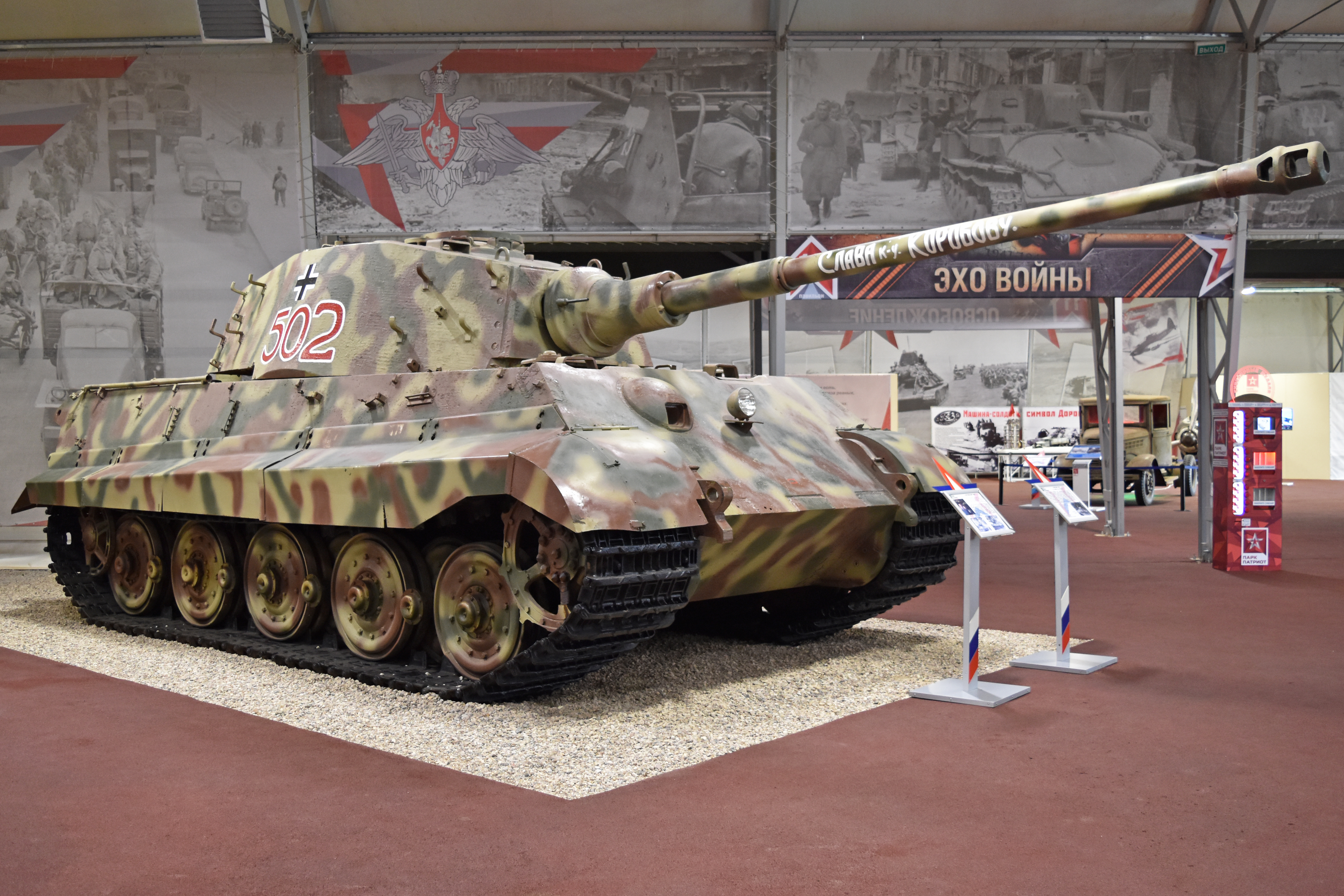
Tiger II ("Royal Tiger") captured in Oglendów. Armored Museum in Kubinka

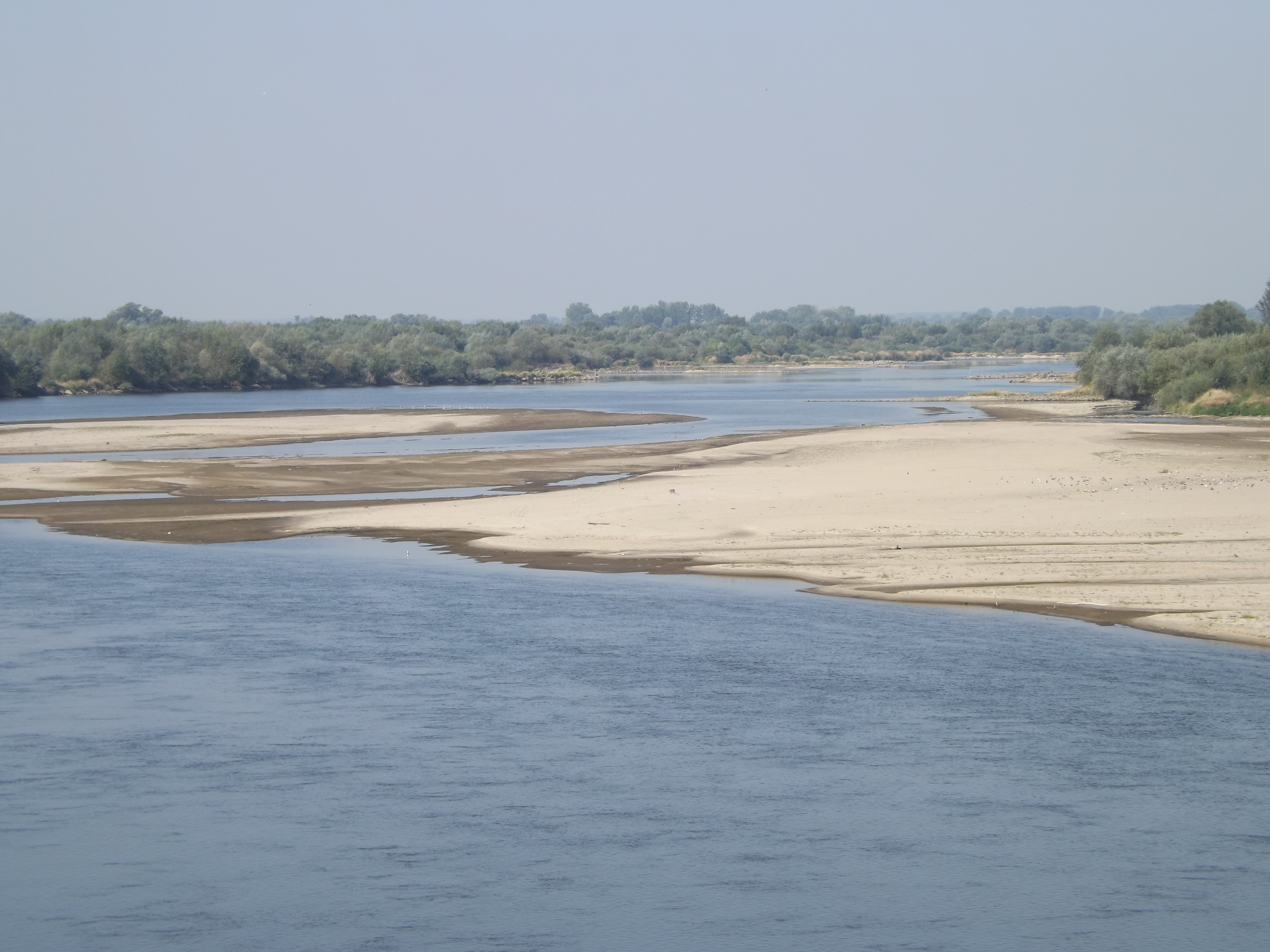
Vistula in the Nagnayów district

Sandomierz bridgehead, also known as Sandomierz-Baranów bridgehead (Polish: przyczółek baranowsko-sandomierski, Russian: Сандомирский плацдарм) was a pocket of resistance created by Red Army's 1st Ukrainian Front in late July 1944 on the left bank of the Vistula River in German-occupied Poland. Located around the towns of Sandomierz and Baranów, it covered roughly 40 by 70 kilometres.

The creation of the bridgehead was one of the final acts of the Lvov–Sandomierz offensive of the Red Army. In the evening of 29 July 1944 elements of the 350th Rifle Division under Major General Grigori Vekhin reached the Vistula River and crossed it near Baranów. The following day a large part of the 13th Army followed into the gap, along with 1st Guards Tank Army. By the end of the day the bridgehead was expanded to a strip of land 12 by 8 kilometres. Simultaneously, elements of the 3rd Guards Army created a new bridgehead across the Vistula near Annopol, some 60 kilometres (37 mi) downstream.

The Wehrmacht started a massive counter-attack on 1 August 1944 by a pincer movement from Mielec and Tarnobrzeg. After several days of heavy fighting, the Soviet 33rd Rifle Corps and 9th Mechanized Corps pushed the German forces back and threw them out of Tarnobrzeg by 6 August.

On 11 August the Germans started yet another counter-attack, this time from Szydłów intending to cut the Soviet units from the river. However, the German offensive came to a standstill after three days, and on 14 August the Soviets started a push from the direction of Klimontów and a small bridgehead near Zawichost towards the north. The Soviet attack reached Sandomierz, but was stopped soon afterwards. By the end of the month both sides dug, unable to mount further offensive movements, and went on defence. The front stabilised until 7 January 1945, when the Vistula–Oder offensive started.

== Remembrance ==
In Opatów, soldiers from the 6th Army of the 1st Ukrainian Front are buried, about 6,000 of whom died in the fighting in the Opatów area. They are buried in 32 mass graves. In Sandomierz, 11,451 soldiers of the Red Army are buried, who died in the fighting to capture the city in July 1944, and in various other towns in the vicinity of Sandomierz. Soldiers from the 1st, 3rd and 4th Guards Tank Armies and the 6th, 13th and 59th Armies of the 1st Ukrainian Front are buried there. The cemetery also contains the grave of Colonel Vasyl Skopenko and Bulgarian citizen Karlo Szabanski. The cemetery in Stopnica is home to 1,892 Soviet soldiers who died in the fighting for Stopnica and those who died in the vicinity of Łubnice. The bodies of those killed in the fights for Stopnica were transferred from Łubnice to the cemetery in Stopnica in 1946.
