= Makarikha =

Makarikha Макариха
- Village
- Location within Vladimir Oblast Location within Russia
- Coordinates: 56°20′N 40°48′E
- Country: Russia
- Region: Vladimir Oblast
- District: Kameshkovsky District
- Time zone: UTC+3:00

Makarikha (Russian: Макариха) is a rural locality (a village) in Sergeikhinskoye Rural Settlement, Kameshkovsky District, Vladimir Oblast, Russia. The population was 33 as of 2010.

== Geography ==
Makarikha is located 13 km west of Kameshkovo (the district's administrative centre) by road. Dmitrikovo is the nearest rural locality.
