= Pereslavsky Uyezd =

Territorial subdivision of the Russian Empire

Pereslavsky Uyezd (Переславский уезд) was one of the subdivisions of Vladimir Governorate of the Russian Empire. It was situated in the western part of the governorate. Its administrative centre was Pereslavl-Zalessky.

== Demographics ==
At the time of the Russian Empire Census of 1897, Pereslavsky Uyezd had a population of 87,337. Of these, 99.9% spoke Russian and 0.1% Yiddish as their native language.
