= Lower Silesian offensive =

1945 military offensive by the USSR in the Eastern Front of WWII

- Part of the Silesian offensives on the Eastern Front of World War II
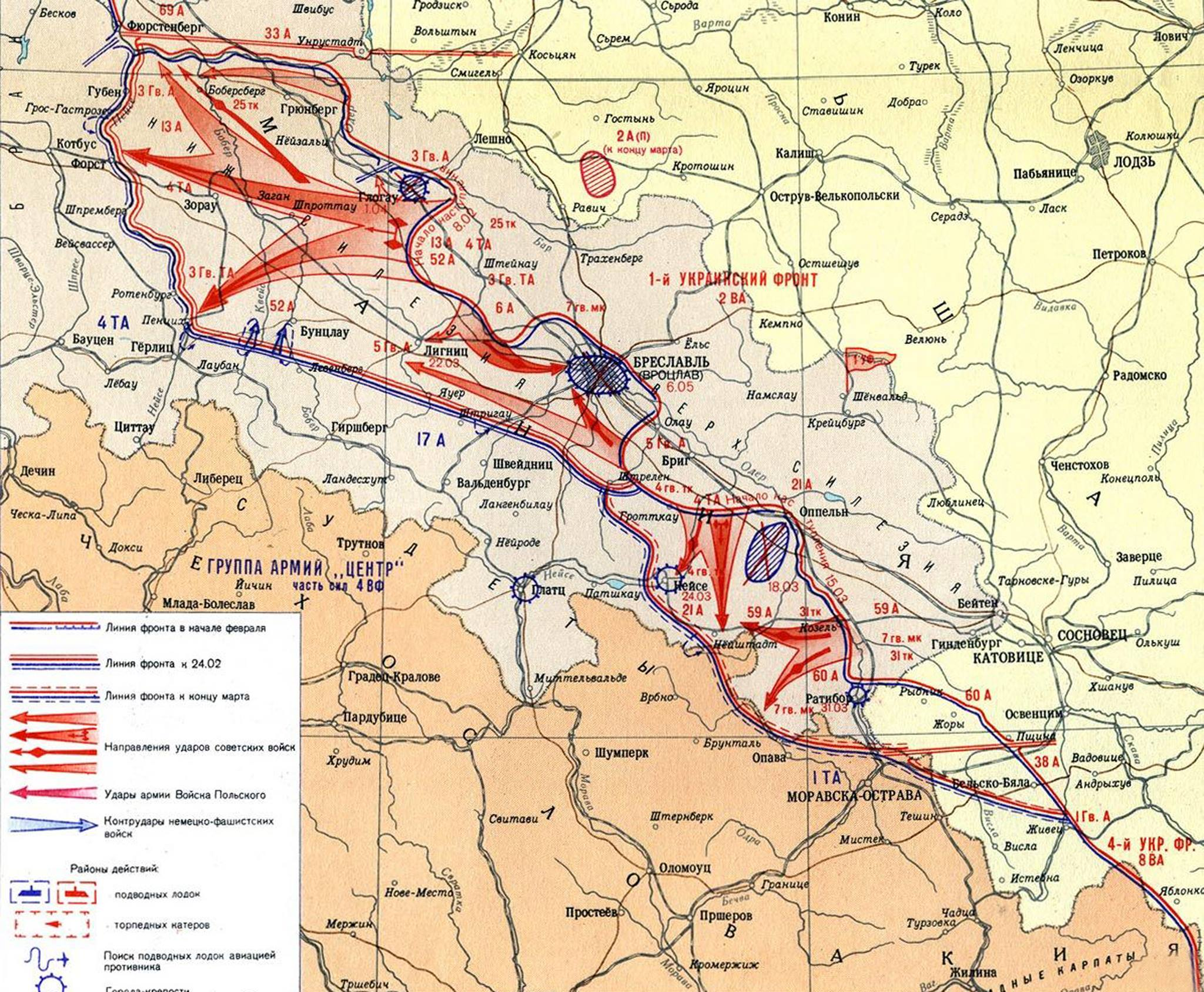
- Russian map of the Silesian offensives
| Date | 8–24 February 1945 |
| Location | Lower Silesia |
| Result | Soviet victory |

Belligerents
| Germany | Soviet Union |

Commanders and leaders
| (Nazi Germany) Ferdinand Schörner | (Soviet Union) Ivan Konev |

The Lower Silesian offensive (Russian: Нижне-Силезская наступательная операция) was a Soviet offensive on the Eastern Front of World War II in 1945, involving forces of the 1st Ukrainian Front under Marshal Ivan Konev. It cleared German troops from much of Lower Silesia and besieged a large German force in the provincial capital, Breslau. The offensive began on February 8 and continued until February 24, when the Soviets ceased their offensive having captured a small bridgehead across the Neisse River near Forst. The offensive directly succeeded the Vistula–Oder offensive, in which Konev's troops had driven the German Army Group A from Poland, liberating Kraków and taking bridgeheads over the Oder.

== Deployments ==
=== Red Army ===
- Northern wing of 1st Ukrainian Front (Marshal Ivan Konev)
  - 3rd Guards Tank Army (General Pavel Rybalko)
  - 4th Tank Army (Major-General Dmitry Lelyushenko)
  - 3rd Guards Army
  - 5th Guards Army
  - 6th Army (Lt. Gen. V. A. Gluzdovskii)
  - 52nd Army
  - 2nd Air Army

=== Wehrmacht ===
- Northern wing of Army Group A (redesignated Army Group Centre) (Field-Marshal Ferdinand Schoerner)
  - Seventeenth Army (General Friedrich Schulz)
    - XXXXVIII Panzer Corps
    - LVII Panzer Corps
    - XVII Corps
    - VIII Corps
    - Garrison of Fortress Breslau
  - Fourth Panzer Army (General Fritz-Hubert Gräser)
    - XXIV Panzer Corps
    - Panzerkorps Grossdeutschland
    - XXXX Panzer Corps
    - Gruppe Friedrich

== The offensive ==
Konev intended to break out of the Steinau and Ohlau bridgeheads, which had been secured at the end of the Vistula–Oder offensive, on February 8. He preceded the initial attack with a fifty-minute artillery bombardment, his troops crossing the start lines at 06:00. By the end of the day the Front's spearheads had penetrated some 60km. The 3rd Guards Tank Army was ordered to wheel southwards and then eastwards in order to encircle the city of Breslau from the rear, while the 4th Tank Army continued its push westwards from the Steinau bridgehead.

By February 15, forces from the two bridgeheads had surrounded Breslau while 3rd Guards Tank Army had closed the gap to the west, only elements of the German 269th Infantry Division managing to withdraw. Another 35,000 troops and 80,000 civilians had been blockaded in Breslau. The resulting Siege of Breslau lasted until the very end of the war.

The 4th Tank Army, in the meantime, had pushed far ahead towards the Neisse River, against some resistance from Fourth Panzer Army. On February 14, two German corps (the Großdeutschland and XXIV Panzer Corps) mounted a sudden counter-attack that left Lelyushenko's force in a desperate fight to avoid encirclement. The Germans were unable to close the encirclement, and ceased attacking operations within five days, when the 52nd Army and 3rd Guards Tank Army were able to secure the flanks of Lelyushenko's position.

On February 24, faced with heavy German reinforcements, Konev closed the offensive phase of operations, having secured a small bridgehead across the Neisse near Forst. This effectively defined the start lines in that sector for the Battle of Berlin, or Berlin offensive, two months later.

== Aftermath ==
Schoerner attempted to win back some territory during March with successful counter-attacks at Lauban and Striegau. An offensive to relieve Breslau was however disrupted by an offensive on the 1st Ukrainian Front's right flank to the south-east: the Upper Silesian offensive.
