= 642nd Cannon Artillery Regiment =

642nd Cannon Artillery Regiment of the Reserve of the High Command
- 642-й пушечный артиллерийский полк Резерва Главного Командования
- Active: October 1, 1941–July 1945
- Disbanded: Predecessor: 594th Heavy Cannon Artillery Regiment; Successor: 24th Cannon Artillery Brigade (1945–1947)
- Allegiance: Armed Forces of the Soviet Union
- Branch: Ground Troops
- Type: Artillery
- Role: Artillery Regiment
- Engagements: Great Patriotic War (1941–1945): Battle of Kursk; Kalinkovichi–Mozyr Operation; Berlin Offensive Operation
- Battle honours: Order of Lenin; Order of the Red Banner; Order of Suvorov

Commanders
- Notable commanders: Major Pyotr Tsygankov; Lieutenant Colonel Valentin Savitsky; Lieutenant Colonel Vladimir Kerp; Colonel Alexey Sigin; Lieutenant Colonel Mikhail Grishin

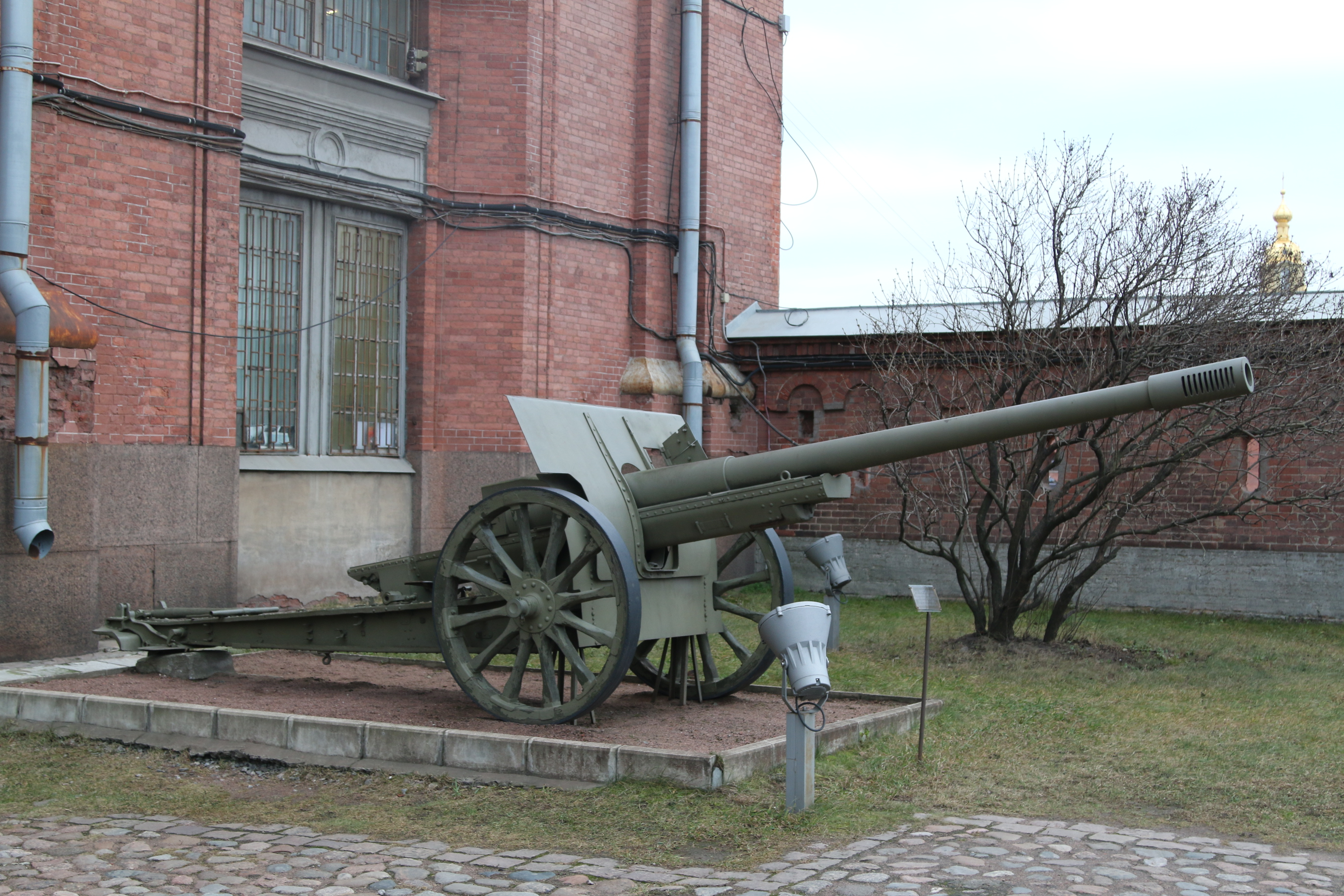
107–mm cannon, model 1910/30

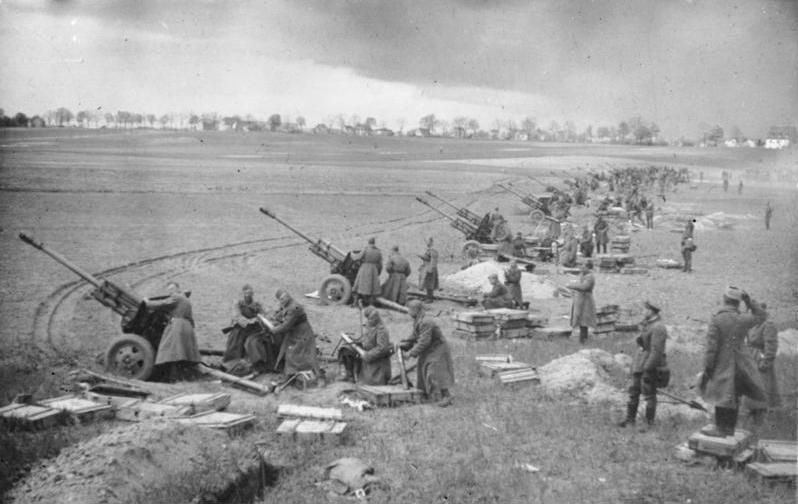
Soviet artillery on the outskirts of Berlin, April 1945

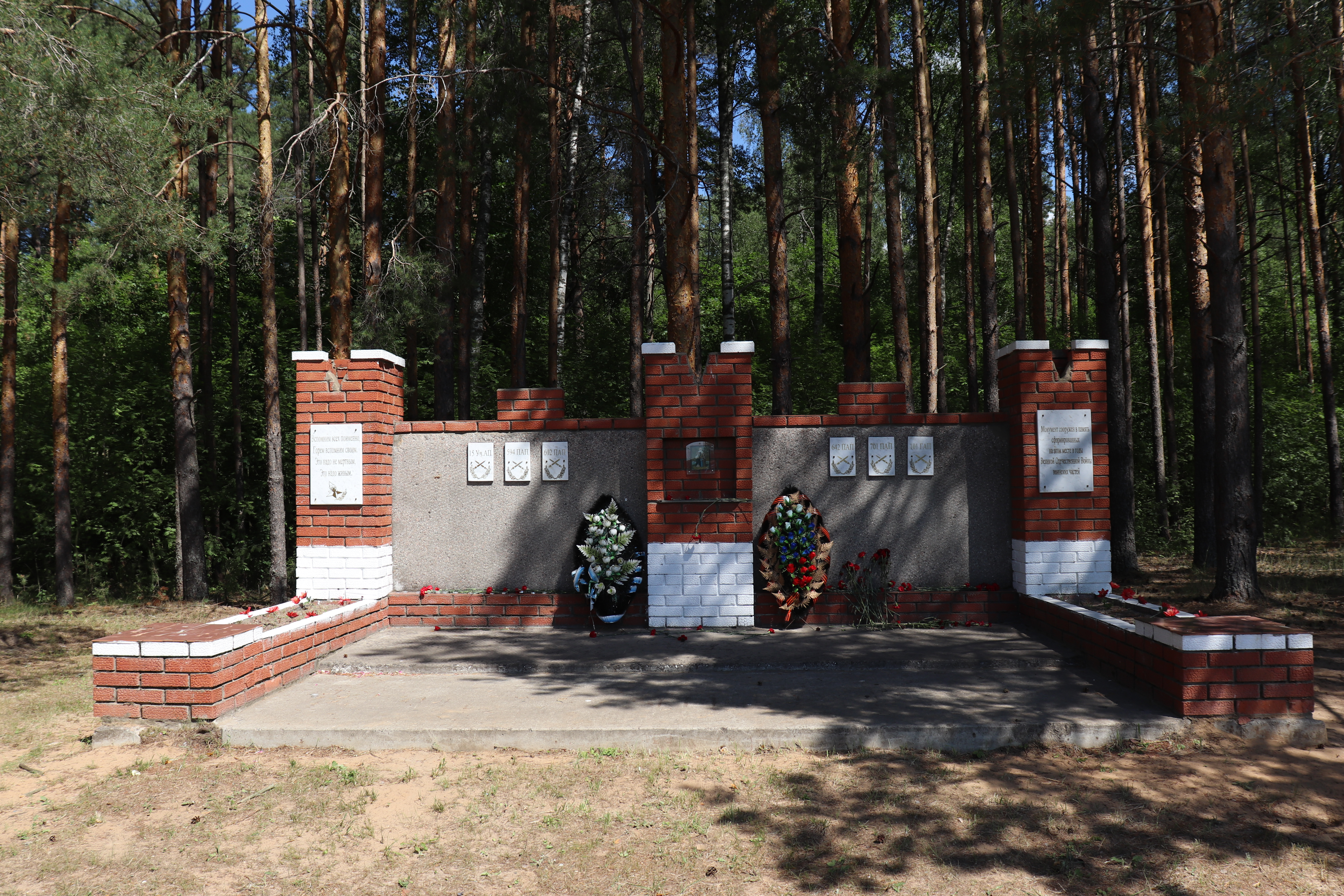
Memorial of the military units formed on the Shuya Land, near the village of Kosyachevo

642nd Cannon Artillery Regiment (Order of Lenin, Red Banner, Order of Suvorov) of the Reserve of the Main Command was a military formation of the Armed Forces of the Soviet Union that took part in the Great Patriotic War.

Conventional name – Military Unit Field Mail No. 45982.

== History of formation ==
In September 1941, on the basis of Directive of the People's Commissar of Defense of the Soviet Union No. 107601 of September 22, 1941, on the basis of the 3rd Divizion of the 594th Heavy Cannon Artillery Regiment of the Artillery of the Reserve of the Main Command of the Moscow Military District, the 642nd Heavy Cannon Artillery Regiment of the Artillery of the Reserve of the Main Command was formed (on the basis of the 1st Divizion, the 594th Cannon Artillery Regiment of the Artillery of the Reserve of the Main Command was formed, on the basis of the 2nd – the 602nd Cannon Artillery Regiment of the Artillery of the Reserve of the Main Command), according to the state number 08/111, as part of 2 divizions, three two–gun batteries of 107–mm cannons of the 1910/30 model. The regiment was formed from September 23 to October 1, 1941, in the Kaluga barracks in the city of Shuya. Private, junior and middle command personnel called up from the districts of the Ivanovo Oblast were sent to staff the regiment.

On October 1, 1941, the regiment received a combat order for loading with a task to follow the railway to the front. On October 2, at the railway station in the city of Shuya, the regiment unloaded in two echelons. While traveling by rail, the 1st echelon of the regiment crashed at 19:00 on October 5, seven wagons with ammunition and cars with fuel were overturned, 11 cars, 3 tractors, 5 trailers, ammunition were destroyed, 6 people died, 11 people were wounded.

The numerical strength and combat strength of the regiment as of November 1, 1941: people – 700, trucks – 50, rifles – 468, light machine guns – 9, Degtyarev Submachine Guns – 3, 107–mm cannons – 10.

== Participation in hostilities ==
Period of entry into the army: October 6, 1941 – May 9, 1945.

On October 6, 1941, the regiment arrived in two echelons at the Akhtyrka Station of the Sumy Oblast and on October 7, became part of the 21st Army. From 10 to 15 October, in the area of Akhtyrka, Detskoe Mestechko, Khukhrya, the regiment supported the 295th Rifle Division. For 4 days, the regiment held back the enemy's infantry and tanks offensive, preventing the enemy from crossing the Vorskla River. As a result of artillery fire, up to 1.5 enemy infantry battalions were destroyed in the Detskoe Mestechko area and at the crossing in the village of Zarechye, 2 tanks were knocked out, an anti–tank gun, 40 vehicles were destroyed, and a staff bus with valuable documents left by the enemy was captured. The enemy retreated in panic. The regiment had losses in materiel, 2 guns were knocked out, of which one was put into operation on October 14. The regiment covered the withdrawal of units of the 21st Army, including the 295th Rifle Division, retreating along the route: Akhtyrka, Pravdinsky Sugar Plant, Bolshaya Pisarevka, Gaivoron, Novoborisovka, Belgorod, Shebekino, Popovka, Slonovka, Novy Oskol. Upon arrival in Novy Oskol on November 2, 1941, by order of the commander of the 21st Army, the regiment concentrated in the village of Staraya Bezginka, where from November 4 to November 30, 1941, it was engaged in combat and political training.

On December 2, by order of the commander of the 21st Army, the regiment concentrated in the city of Novy Oskol for loading and following by rail to the Kastornoye Station. After unloading, it was redeployed to the village of Skakun, where, by order of the headquarters of the South–Western Front, it entered the order of the 1st Guards Rifle Division. From December 3, 1941 to January 5, 1942, the regiment took part in battles, supporting the 1st Guards Rifle Division in the combat area: Dubovets, Rich Rafts, Pyatnitskoe, Koshkino, Izmalkovo, Rassoshnoe, Khomutovo, Dyachkovskoe, Karpovka, Sinkovets, Berezovets, Meryaev Works, Krasny and other settlements of the Oryol Oblast. During the period of participation in combat operations, the regiment with its fire successfully ensured the advance of the units of the 1st Guards Rifle Division, inflicting heavy losses on the enemy in manpower and equipment.

On January 5, 1942, the regiment entered the disposal of the 13th Army. From 7 to 15 January, the regiment supported the 129th Tank Brigade in the area of hostilities Verkhniy Zhernovets, Muratovka, Sennoye. Since January 16, the regiment, acting with the 132nd Infantry Division, has repeatedly successfully repelled enemy counterattacks, inflicting heavy casualties on them.

On November 10, 1942, the regiment carried out the loading at the Livny Station and was sent in two echelons to the Lobanovo Station, where it was unloaded during November 11–12. On November 13, on the basis of the order of the People's Commissar of Defense of the Soviet Union No. 00226 of October 31, 1942 and the order of the Bryansk Front No. 0070 of November 4, 1942, the regiment became part of the 5th Artillery Division of the Reserve of the Main Command and began equipping firing positions and training for combat and political training.

On December 11, 1942, the 642nd and 753rd Cannon Artillery Regiments became part of the newly formed 24th Heavy Cannon Artillery Brigade of the 5th Artillery Division.

Based on the directive of the artillery commander of the Group of Soviet Occupation Forces in Germany No. 7/00783 dated June 21, 1945, in July 1945, the 24th Cannon Artillery Brigade (642nd and 753rd Cannon Artillery Regiments) was withdrawn from the 5th Artillery Breakthrough Division (Kalinkovichi, Red Banner) and transferred to the recruitment of the newly created 32nd Cannon Artillery Division (Military Unit 78254), while the brigade was reorganized into a 4 divisional composition and received the name 24th Cannon Artillery Brigade (Berlin, Order of Lenin, 3 Times Red Banner, 2 Times Order of Suvorov). All awards and honorary titles of the 642nd and 753rd Cannon Artillery Regiments were transferred to the brigade. The 32nd Cannon Artillery Division was disbanded in the summer of 1947.

== Full name ==
- 642nd Heavy Cannon Artillery Regiment of the Artillery of the Reserve of the Main Command;
- 642nd Cannon Artillery Regiment of the Reserve of the Main Command;
- 642nd Artillery Regiment of the Reserve of the Main Command;
- 642nd Cannon Artillery Regiment, 24th Cannon Artillery Brigade, 5th Artillery Breakthrough Division, 4th Breakthrough Artillery Corps, Reserve of the Main Command.

== Subordination ==
Subordination
Date	Front (District)	Army	Corps	Division	Brigade	Notes
01.10.1941	Moscow Military District	-	-	-	-	-
07.10.1941	Southwestern Front	21st Army	-	-	-	Supported the 295th Infantry Division
01.11.1941	Southwestern Front	21st Army	-	-	-	-
01.12.1941	Southwestern Front	21st Army	-	-	-	Supported the 1st Guards Rifle Division
01.01.1942	Bryansk Front	Operational Group of General Fyodor Kostenko	-	-	-	Supported the 129th Tank Brigade, 132nd Infantry Division
01.02.1942	Bryansk Front	13th Army	-	-	-	-
01.03.1942	Bryansk Front	13th Army	-	-	-	-
01.04.1942	Bryansk Front	13th Army	-	-	-	-
01.05.1942	Bryansk Front	13th Army	-	-	-	-
01.06.1942	Bryansk Front	13th Army	-	-	-	-
01.07.1942	Bryansk Front	13th Army	-	-	-	-
01.08.1942	Bryansk Front	13th Army	-	-	-	-
01.09.1942	Bryansk Front	13th Army	-	-	-	-
01.10.1942	Bryansk Front	13th Army	-	-	-	-
01.11.1942	Bryansk Front	13th Army	-	-	-	-
01.12.1942	Bryansk Front	Frontline Subordination	-	5th Artillery Division	24th Cannon Artillery Brigade	-
01.01.1943	Bryansk Front	Frontline Subordination	-	5th Artillery Division	24th Cannon Artillery Brigade	-
01.02.1943	Bryansk Front	13th Army	-	5th Artillery Division	24th Cannon Artillery Brigade	-
01.03.1943	Bryansk Front	13th Army	-	5th Artillery Division	24th Cannon Artillery Brigade	-
01.04.1943	Central Front	13th Army	-	5th Artillery Division	24th Cannon Artillery Brigade	-
01.05.1943	Central Front	13th Army	-	5th Artillery Division	24th Cannon Artillery Brigade	-
01.06.1943	Central Front	13th Army	4th Artillery Breakthrough Corps	5th Artillery Division	24th Cannon Artillery Brigade	-
01.07.1943	Central Front	13th Army	4th Artillery Corps	5th Artillery Division	24th Cannon Artillery Brigade	-
01.08.1943	Central Front	70th Army	4th Artillery Breakthrough Corps	5th Artillery Division	24th Cannon Artillery Brigade	-
01.09.1943	Central Front	65th Army	4th Artillery Breakthrough Corps	5th Artillery Division	24th Cannon Artillery Brigade	-
01.10.1943	Central Front	Frontline Subordination	4th Artillery Breakthrough Corps	5th Artillery Division	24th Cannon Artillery Brigade	-
01.11.1943	Belorussian Front	65th Army	4th Artillery Breakthrough Corps	5th Artillery Division	24th Cannon Artillery Brigade	-
01.12.1943	Belorussian Front	Frontline Subordination	4th Artillery Breakthrough Corps	5th Artillery Division	24th Cannon Artillery Brigade	-
01.01.1944	Belorussian Front	65th Army	4th Artillery Breakthrough Corps	5th Artillery Division	24th Cannon Artillery Brigade	-
01.02.1944	Belorussian Front	65th Army	4th Artillery Breakthrough Corps	5th Artillery Breakthrough Division	24th Cannon Artillery Brigade	-
01.03.1944	1st Belorussian Front	65th Army	4th Artillery Breakthrough Corps	5th Artillery Breakthrough Division	24th Cannon Artillery Brigade	-
01.04.1944	1st Belorussian Front	Frontline Subordination	4th Artillery Breakthrough Corps	5th Artillery Breakthrough Division	24th Cannon Artillery Brigade	-
01.05.1944	1st Belorussian Front	Frontline Subordination	4th Artillery Breakthrough Corps	5th Artillery Breakthrough Division	24th Cannon Artillery Brigade	-
01.06.1944	1st Belorussian Front	Frontline Subordination	4th Artillery Breakthrough Corps	5th Artillery Breakthrough Division	24th Cannon Artillery Brigade	-
01.07.1944	1st Belorussian Front	Frontline Subordination	4th Artillery Breakthrough Corps	5th Artillery Breakthrough Division	24th Cannon Artillery Brigade	-
01.08.1944	1st Belorussian Front	Frontline Subordination	4th Artillery Breakthrough Corps	5th Artillery Breakthrough Division	24th Cannon Artillery Brigade	-
01.09.1944	1st Belorussian Front	70th Army	-	5th Artillery Breakthrough Division	24th Cannon Artillery Brigade	-
01.10.1944	1st Belorussian Front	70th Army	-	5th Artillery Breakthrough Division	24th Cannon Artillery Brigade	-
01.11.1944	1st Belorussian Front	47th Army	-	5th Artillery Breakthrough Division	24th Cannon Artillery Brigade	-
01.12.1944	1st Belorussian Front	Frontline Subordination	4th Artillery Breakthrough Corps	5th Artillery Breakthrough Division	24th Cannon Artillery Brigade	-
01.01.1945	1st Belorussian Front	69th Army	4th Artillery Breakthrough Corps	5th Artillery Breakthrough Division	24th Cannon Artillery Brigade	-
01.02.1945	1st Belorussian Front	33rd Army	-	5th Artillery Breakthrough Division	24th Cannon Artillery Brigade	-
01.03.1945	1st Belorussian Front	47th Army	-	5th Artillery Breakthrough Division	24th Cannon Artillery Brigade	-
01.04.1945	1st Belorussian Front	47th Army	-	5th Artillery Breakthrough Division	24th Cannon Artillery Brigade	-
01.05.1945	1st Belorussian Front	3rd Shock Army	4th Artillery Breakthrough Corps	5th Artillery Breakthrough Division	24th Cannon Artillery Brigade	-

== Commanding staff ==
=== Regiment commanders ===
- Pyotr Tsygankov (September 25, 1941 – January 3, 1942), Major;
- Valentin Savitsky (January 3, 1942 – April 1942), Lieutenant Colonel;
- Vladimir Kerp (May 1942 – January 13, 1943), Major, Lieutenant Colonel;
- Vasily Bulanenkov (January 13, 1943 – January 16, 1943), Major (interim);
- Alexey Sigin (January 16, 1943 – October 1943), Lieutenant Colonel, Colonel;
- Mikhail Grishin (October 1943 – 1945), Lieutenant Colonel.

=== Deputy commanders for political affairs ===
- Vasily Petkun (September 26, 1941 – July 22, 1942), Battalion Commissar.

=== Deputy commanders for combat units ===
- Stepan Tarasenko (until December 11, 1942), Major.

=== Chiefs of staff of the regiment ===
- Vladislav Stotsky (until October 14, 1941), Captain;
- Nikolay Dmitrienko (December 9, 1941 – January 1942), Captain;
- Danilov (May 15, 1942 – September 15, 1942), Captain, Major.

== Awards ==
Award (name)	Awarding date	For what it was received
Order of Lenin	Awarded by the decree of the Presidium of the Supreme Soviet of the Soviet Union of September 21, 1943	For the exemplary performance of the combat missions of the command on the front of the struggle against the German invaders and for the valor and courage shown at the same time
Order of the Red Banner	Awarded by the decree of the Presidium of the Supreme Soviet of the Soviet Union of February 14, 1943	For the exemplary performance of the combat missions of the command on the front of the struggle against the German invaders and for the valor and courage shown at the same time
Order of Suvorov, 3rd Class	Awarded by the decree of the Presidium of the Supreme Soviet of the Soviet Union of June 11, 1945	For exemplary performance of command assignments in battles against the German invaders during the capture of the capital of Germany, Berlin, and for the valor and courage shown in this

== Distinguished soldiers of the regiment ==
Reward	Full name	Position	Rank	Awarding date
Hero of the Soviet Union	Alexey Neznakin	Intelligence Squad Leader	Sergeant	February 21, 1945
Hero of the Soviet Union	Prokofy Strenakov	Command Platoon Commander	Lieutenant	December 24, 1943

== Remembrance ==
- Thanks to the joint work of the Council of Veterans of the 602nd Cannon Artillery Regiment and the Poisk Club of the Shuya School No. 18, in 1975, near the village of Kosyachevo, Shuysky District, a memorial sign was erected about the military units formed on the Shuya Land: the 602nd Cannon and 101st Howitzer Srtillery Regiments. Over time, it was possible to establish the names of four more formed artillery regiments: the 15th Training, 594th, 642nd and 701th Cannon Regiments. Therefore, the Shuya Council of Military Service Veterans came up with an initiative to erect a new monument on this site, which was opened on June 28, 2009.

== Sources ==
- Feskov, Vitaly; Kalashnikov, Konstantin; Golikov, Valery (2003). "Глава 5. Артиллерия Красной Армии в годы Великой Отечественной войны" [Chapter 5. Artillery of the Red Army During the Great Patriotic War]. Красная Армия в победах и поражениях 1941-1945 гг [The Red Army in Victories and Defeats in 1941–1945]. Tomsk: Tomsk University Press. ISBN 5-7511-1624-0.
- Team of Authors (2013). Armed Forces of the Soviet Union After World War II: From the Red Army to the Soviet (Part 1: Ground Forces). Tomsk: Publishing House of Scientific and Technical Literature. ISBN 978-5-89503-530-6.
- Collection of Orders of the Revolutionary Military Council of the Republic, the Revolutionary Military Council of the Soviet Union, the People's Commissariat of Defense and Decrees of the Presidium of the Supreme Soviet of the Soviet Union on Awarding Orders of the Soviet Union to Units, Formations and Institutions of the Armed Forces of the Soviet Union. Part I. 1920–1944. Moscow: Department of Affairs of the Ministry of Defense of the Soviet Union. 1967.
- Collection of Orders of the People's Commissariat of Defense, the Minister of Defense of the Soviet Union and Decrees of the Presidium of the Supreme Soviet of the Soviet Union on Awarding Orders of the Soviet Union to Units, Formations and Institutions of the Armed Forces of the Soviet Union. Part II. 1945–1966. Moscow: Department of Affairs of the Ministry of Defense of the Soviet Union. 1967.
- Pokrovsky A. P. (1960). List No. 13. Artillery, Mortar, Anti–Aircraft Machine Gun Regiments and Air Defense Regiments of Railway Echelons That Were Part of the Active Army During the Great Patriotic War of 1941–1945 (Artillery Regiments). Moscow: Ministry of Defence.
- Ivan Shkadov (1988). Heroes of the Soviet Union: A Brief Biographical Dictionary. Moscow: Military Publishing House of the Ministry of Defense of the Soviet Union. ISBN 5-203-00536-2.
