= Battle of the Seelow Heights =

WWII German-Soviet military engagement

Battle of Seelow Heights
- Part of the Eastern Front of the Second World War and the Battle of Berlin
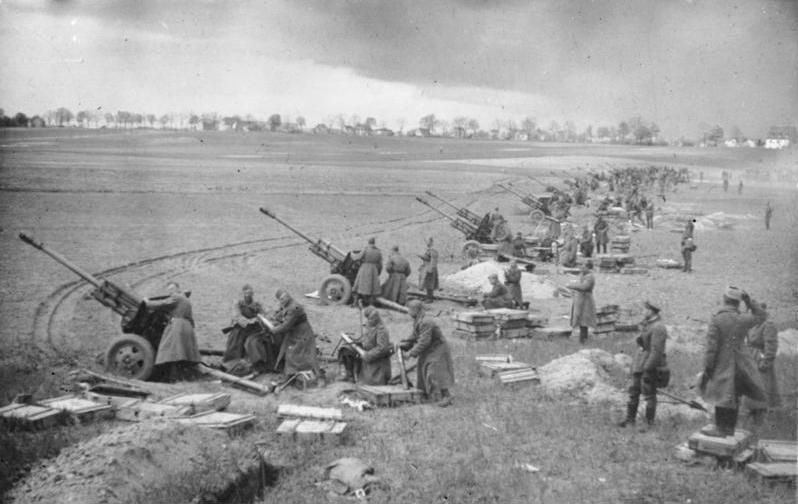
- Soviet artillery bombarding German positions during the battle
Date	16–19 April 1945
Location	Seelow Heights, Province of Brandenburg, Prussia, Germany 52°31′47.3″N 14°25′33.9″E
Result	Soviet victory
Territorial changes	Soviet final encirclement of Berlin

Belligerents
Soviet Union; Poland	Germany

Commanders and leaders
(Soviet Union) Georgy Zhukov (Soviet Union) Vasily Chuikov (Soviet Union) Ivan Konev	(Nazi Germany) Gotthard Heinrici (Nazi Germany) Ferdinand Schörner (Nazi Germany) Theodor Busse

Strength
1,000,000 men 3,059 tanks 16,934 guns and mortars	112,143 men 587 tanks 2,625 guns

Casualties and losses
Isaev: 5,000–6,000 killed and missing out of ~20,000 total casualties (1st Belorussian Front); Hastings and Beevor: 30,000 killed	Hastings: 12,000 killed

The Battle of the Seelow Heights (German: Schlacht um die Seelower Höhen) was part of the Berlin Strategic Offensive Operation (16 April – 2 May 1945). A pitched battle, it was one of the last assaults on large entrenched defensive positions of the Second World War. It was fought over three days, from 16 to 19 April 1945. Close to 1,000,000 Soviet soldiers of the 1st Belorussian Front (including 78,556 soldiers of the Polish 1st Army), commanded by Marshal Georgy Zhukov, attacked the position known as the "Gates of Berlin". They were opposed by about 110,000 soldiers of the German 9th Army, commanded by General Theodor Busse, as part of the Army Group Vistula.

This battle is often incorporated into the Battle of the Oder–Neisse. The Seelow Heights was where some of the most bitter fighting in the overall battle took place, but it was only one of several crossing points along the Oder and Neisse rivers where the Soviets attacked. The Battle of the Oder–Neisse was itself only the opening phase of the Battle of Berlin.

The result was the encirclement of the German 9th Army and the ensuing Battle of Halbe in which the 9th Army was destroyed.

== Buildup ==
On 9 April 1945, Königsberg in East Prussia fell to the Soviet Army. This freed the 2nd Belorussian Front under Marshal Konstantin Rokossovsky to move to the east bank of the Oder. During the first two weeks of April, the Soviets performed their fastest front redeployment of the war. The 2nd Belorussian Front relieved the 1st Belorussian Front along the lower Oder between Schwedt and the Baltic Sea.

This allowed the 1st Belorussian Front to concentrate in the southern half of its former front, opposite the Seelow Heights. To the south, the 1st Ukrainian Front under Marshal Ivan Konev shifted its main force from Upper Silesia north-west to the Neisse River.

The three Soviet fronts together had 2,500,000 men, 6,250 tanks, 7,500 aircraft, 41,600 artillery pieces and mortars, 3,255 truck-mounted Katyusha rocket launchers and 95,383 motor vehicles.

The 1st Belorussian Front had nine regular and two tank armies consisting of 77 rifle divisions, two cavalry, five tank and two mechanized corps, eight artillery and one guards mortars divisions and a mixture of other artillery and rocket launcher brigades. The front had 3,059 tanks and self-propelled guns and 18,934 artillery pieces and mortars.

Eight of the 11 armies were posted along the Oder. In the north, the 61st Army and the 1st Polish Army held the river line from Schwedt to its meeting with the Finow Canal. On the Soviet bridgehead at Küstrin, the 47th Army, 3rd and 5th Shock armies, and the 8th Guards Army were concentrated for the attack.

The 69th Army and 33rd Army covered the river line south to Guben. The 1st Guards and 2nd Guards Tank armies and the 3rd Army were in reserve. The 5th Shock and 8th Guards were posted directly opposite the strongest part of the defences, where the Reichsstraße 1 to Berlin passed through the heights.

The German 9th Army held the front from about the Finow Canal to Guben, an area which included the Seelow Heights. It had 14 divisions, the "Fortress" (Festung) Frankfurt, 587 tanks (512 operable, 55 in repair, 20 in transit) and 2,625 artillery pieces (including 695 anti-aircraft guns). Further south, the front was held by the 4th Panzerarmee, which opposed the 1st Ukrainian Front.

General Gotthard Heinrici replaced Heinrich Himmler as commander of Army Group Vistula on 20 March. He correctly predicted that the main Soviet thrust would be made over the River Oder and along the Reichsstraße 1 at Seelow Heights. He decided to defend the riverbank with only a light skirmishing screen, but to strongly fortify the Seelow Heights, which rise about 48 m (157 ft) above the Oder and overlook the river where the Reichsstraße crossed it. He thinned out the line in other areas to put more men on the heights.

The Oder's floodplain was already saturated by the spring thaw, but German engineers also released water from a reservoir upstream, which turned the plain into a swamp. Behind the heights, they built three lines of defences, spreading back toward Berlin. The last was the Wotan Line, 10–15 mi (16–24 km) behind the front line. These lines consisted of anti-tank ditches, anti-tank gun emplacements, and an extensive network of trenches and bunkers.

== Battle ==
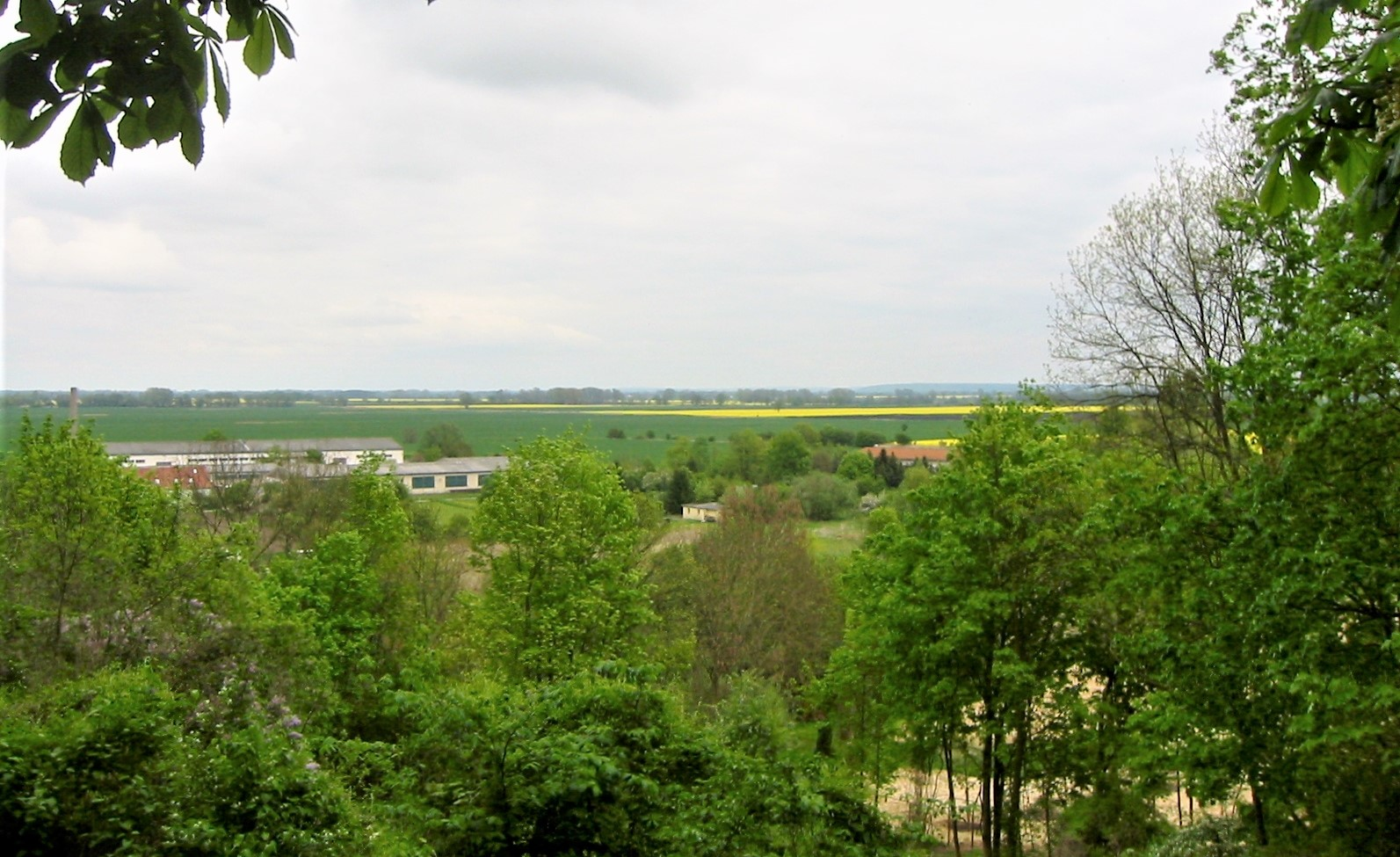
A modern view over the Oder from the Seelow Heights

In the early hours of 16 April, the offensive began with a massive bombardment by some 9,000 artillery pieces and Katyushas. Over 500,000 shells were fired in the first 30 minutes of battle. The bombardment underperformed Soviet expectations. Soviet POWs captured the day prior had disclosed the date of the offensive, and German troops had been pulled back to their second defensive line. The dust and debris kicked up by the bombardment also rendered the mass use of searchlights to illuminate terrain in the early morning hours ineffective. Before dawn, the 1st Belorussian Front attacked across the Oder and the 1st Ukrainian Front attacked across the Neisse. The 1st Belorussian Front was the stronger force, but it had the more difficult assignment since it was facing the bulk of the German forces.

The assault by the 1st Belorussian Front started with an intense artillery bombardment. According to Beevor and Ziemke, Heinrici and Busse had anticipated the attack and withdrew their defenders from the first line of trenches just before the Soviet artillery would have obliterated them. Whereas according to a report to Stalin, Zhukov claimed that:

Considering that the enemy moves its infantry from the first to the second and third lines of trenches in the morning, I used a nightly artillery barrage with a high density of fire for 30 minutes, with the use of searchlights to blind the enemy and light up the terrain ahead of the advancing troops... According to the interrogated prisoners, artillery fire was so sudden and overwhelming that the enemy did not have time to move from the first trench line; the second and third lines were at all times under heavy fire from our artillery. As a result of this, the enemy units in the first line of defence suffered heavy casualties.

The swampy ground proved to be a great hindrance, and a German counter-barrage caused heavy Soviet casualties. Frustrated by the slow advance, Zhukov threw in his reserves, which according to his earlier plan were to be held back until the expected breakthrough. By early evening, an advance of 4–6 km (2.5–3.7 mi) had been achieved (the 7th Rifle Corps from the 3rd Shock Army had advanced 8 km (5.0 mi)), but the second German defensive line remained intact. Zhukov was forced to report that his battle was not going as planned. However, in the south the attack by Konev's 1st Ukrainian Front was going according to plan. To spur Zhukov on, Stalin told him that he had let Konev direct his tank armies north towards Berlin.

On the second day, the 1st Belorussian Front's troops bolstered by their reserves slowly advanced. By nightfall on 17 April, the German second defensive line (Stein Stellung) was finally broken by the weight of the 5th Shock Army and 2nd Guards Tank Army. The right flank of the 4th Guards Rifle Corps of the 8th Guards Army, together with the 11th Guards Tank Corps of the 1st Guards Tank Army, had taken advantage of the success of their comrades and also advanced. The 47th Army and the 3rd Shock Army progressed another 4–8 km (2.5–5.0 mi).

To the south however, the 1st Ukrainian Front was pushing back the 4th Panzer Army; the left flank of Army Group Centre under Ferdinand Schörner was beginning to crumble. Schörner kept his two reserve panzer divisions in the south covering his centre, instead of using them to shore up the 4th Panzer Army. This was the turning point in the Berlin Offensive because the positions of both Army Group Vistula and the centre and right sectors of Army Group Centre were becoming untenable. Unless they fell back in line with the 4th Panzer Army, they faced envelopment. In effect, Konev's successful attack on Schörner's relatively poor defences to the south of Seelow Heights was unhinging Heinrici's defence.

On 18 April, both Soviet fronts advanced with heavy losses. The Seelow Heights was bypassed from the north, during which Soviet troops met counterattacks by German reserves: 11th SS Panzergrenadier Division Nordland, 23rd SS Panzergrenadier Division Nederland and SS-Panzer Abteilung 103 (503rd). By nightfall, an advance of 3–5 km (1.9–3.1 mi) on the right flank and 3–8 km (1.9–5.0 mi) in the centre had been achieved, and the 1st Belorussian Front had reached the third and final German line of defence.

On 19 April, the 1st Belorussian Front eventually broke through the final defensive line of the Seelow Heights and now nothing but broken German formations lay between them and Berlin. The remnants of the 9th Army and the 4th Panzer Army were enveloped by the 1st Belorussian Front and by elements of the 1st Ukrainian Front which had broken through and turned north. Other armies of the 1st Ukrainian Front raced west towards the Americans. By the close of 19 April, the German eastern frontline had effectively ceased to exist. All that remained were pockets of resistance.

== Aftermath and analysis ==
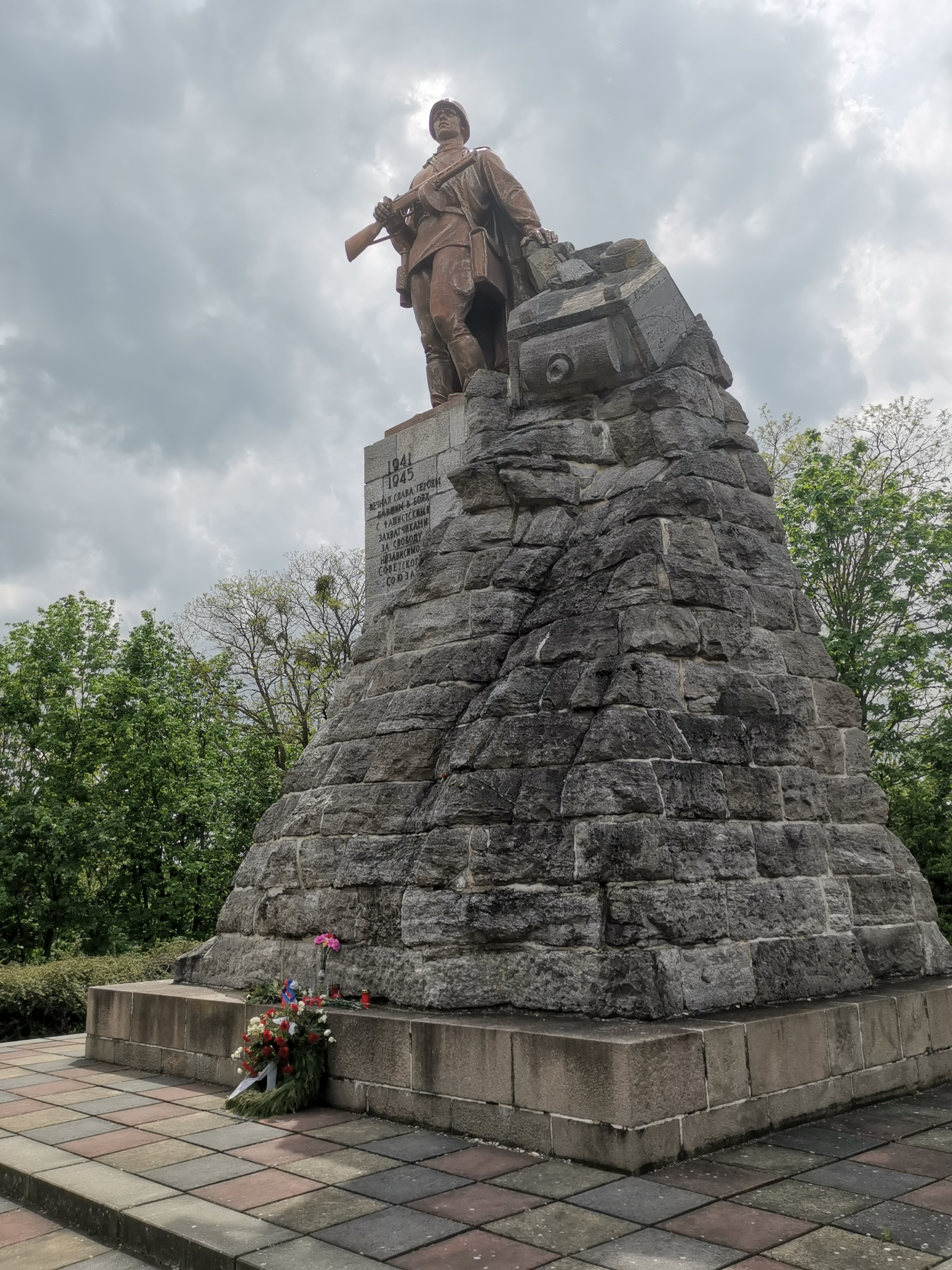
A Soviet monument on the Seelow Heights in 2021

The defensive line on the Seelow Heights was the last major defensive line outside Berlin. From 19 April, the road to Berlin—90 km (56 mi) to the west—lay open. By 23 April, Berlin was fully encircled and the Battle in Berlin commenced. Within two weeks, Adolf Hitler committed suicide and the war in Europe was effectively over.

As a result of the 1st Belorussian Front's success at the Seelow Heights and the Oder Front in general, most of the forces of the German 9th Army were encircled before they could retreat to Berlin. The city was then defended only by broken formations, the Volkssturm, small detachments of Hitler Youth, police, and air defence units, which resulted in the Red Army taking it in 10 days.

After the war, Zhukov's critics asserted that he should have stopped the 1st Belorussian Front's attack via the direct line to Berlin along the Autobahn and instead made use of the 1st Ukrainian Front's breakthrough over the Neisse or concentrate its armies on surrounding Berlin from the north. This would have bypassed the strong German defences at Seelow Heights, and avoided many casualties and the delay in the Berlin advance.

Zhukov supposedly took the shortest path, the critics contend, so that his troops would be the first ones to enter the city. However, Zhukov chose the main thrust to be through the Seelow Heights not because he thought that was the quickest and best way to get to Berlin, but because that was the quickest way to link up with Konev's 1st Ukrainian Front and cut off the German 9th Army from the city.

Also, bypassing the Seelow Heights and attacking Berlin from the north would have exposed the northern flank of the 1st Belorussian Front to a potential attack from German forces to the north, which could have pinned Zhukov's forces against the Seelow Heights. Furthermore, in actuality only two of the five armies of the 1st Belorussian Front attacked the Seelow Heights themselves and the heights were eventually bypassed from the north as soon as there was a narrow breakthrough.

Estimates of Soviet casualties during the assault on the Seelow Heights vary from under 10,000 to over 30,000 killed. (Note: According to Russian historian Aleksey Isaev, based on archival data the 1st Belorussian Front lost 20,000 men, including 5,000–6,000 killed and missing, while the historians Max Hastings and Antony Beevor state that "just over 30,000" were killed. Isaev 2010; Hastings 2005, p. 468; Beevor 2002, p. 244.)
