= 1st Belorussian Front =

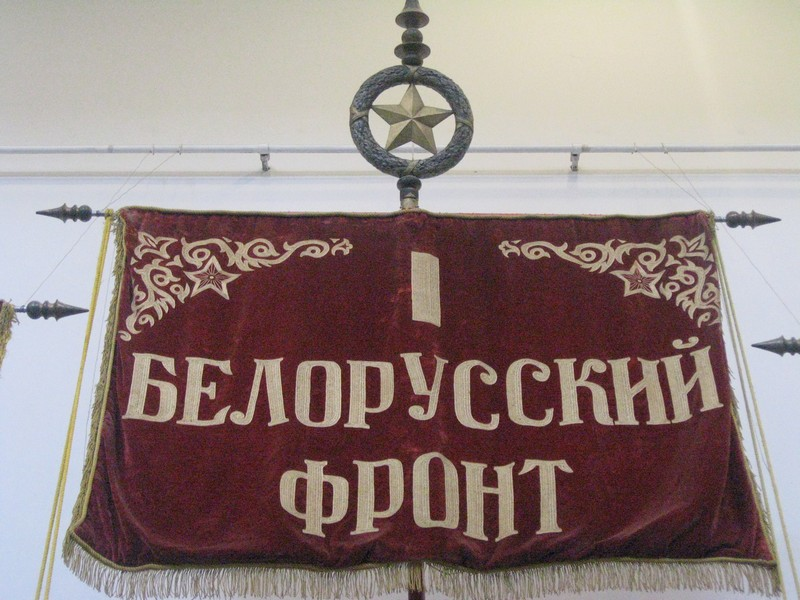
- Standard of the 1st Belorussian Front
- Active: 1943–1945
- Country: Soviet Union
- Branch: Red Army
- Type: Army group
- Role: Co-ordination and conduct of Red Army Operations in Ukraine, Poland, and Germany
- Size: Several Armies
- Engagements: World War II: Eastern Front; Gomel–Rechitsa Offensive Operation; Kalinkovichi-Mozyr Operation; Rogachev-Zhlobin Offensive; Bobruysk Offensive; Warsaw–Poznań Operation; Operation Solstice; Battle of the Seelow Heights; Battle of Berlin

Commanders
- Notable commanders: Marshal Konstantin K. Rokossovsky (October 1943 – November 1944); Marshal Georgy K. Zhukov (November 1944 – June 1945)

The 1st Belorussian Front (Russian: Пéрвый Белорусский фронт, Pervyy Belorusskiy front, also romanized "Byelorussian"), known without a numeral as the Belorussian Front between October 1943 and February 1944, was a major formation of the Red Army during World War II, being equivalent to a Western army group. Alongside the 1st Ukrainian Front, it was the largest and most powerful among all Soviet fronts, as their main effort was to capture Berlin, the capital of Nazi Germany.

== Creation and initial operations ==
Initially, the Belorussian Front was created on 20 October 1943 as the new designation of the existing Central Front. It was placed under the command of General Konstantin K. Rokossovsky, who had been commanding the Central Front. It launched the Gomel-Rechitsa Offensive in 1943 and then the Kalinkovichi-Mozyr Offensive in 1944.

== Redesignation and 1944 operations ==
It was then renamed the 1st Belorussian Front (1BF) on 17 February 1944 following the Dnieper–Carpathian Offensive. A few days later, on 21 February, the Rogachev-Zhlobin Offensive commenced, which continued until 26 February. The next operation was the Bobruysk Offensive, part of Operation Bagration, and on 26 June the attacks of 1BF encircled Bobruisk, trapping 40,000 troops of the German 41st Panzer Corps (part of 9th Army). From 18 July - 2 August the Front was part of the Lublin-Brest Offensive. From 2 August to 30 September, the Front was engaged cleaning out Germans to the east of the Vistula (during which the Battle of Radzymin took place from 1–10 August). Its 8th Guards, 28th, 47th, 65th, 69th, and 70th Armies were involved at Radzymin. Later during that same period on 14 September, with the support of Polish forces, 1BF captured Praga, a suburb of Warsaw.

== Operations in 1945 ==
The next attack was the Warsaw-Poznań Operation, a part of the Vistula-Oder Offensive. On 13 January, 1BF began an offensive toward Pillkallen (Schlossberg between 1938 and 1945) in East Prussia, against which they met stiff resistance from the 3rd Panzer Army. The 1st Belorussian Front opened its attack on the German Ninth Army from the Magnuszew and Puławy bridgeheads at 08:30 on 14 January, again commencing with a heavy bombardment. The 33rd and 69th Armies broke out of the Puławy bridgehead to a depth of 30 km, while the 5th Shock and 8th Guards Armies broke out of the Magnuszew bridgehead. The 2nd and 1st Guards Tank Armies were committed after them to exploit the breach. On 25 January, the Front cut off the fortress city of Poznań which held 66,000 Germans, and continued its 80 km a day advance, leaving the 8th Guards Army to lay siege to the city, which they finally took on 23 February.

== Capture of Berlin ==
Along with the 1st Ukrainian Front, 1BF then stormed Berlin in the climactic Battle of Berlin.

Marshal Georgy Zhukov was appointed commander of the 1BF in November 1944, for its last two great offensives of World War II. After the capture of Poland and East Prussia (its capture was finished on 25 April with capture of Pillau) from January–March 1945, the Soviets redeployed their forces during the first two weeks of April. Marshal Georgy Zhukov concentrated 1BF, which had been deployed along the Oder river from Frankfurt in the south to the Baltic, into an area in front of the Seelow Heights. The 2nd Belorussian Front moved into the positions being vacated by the 1BF north of the Seelow Heights. While this redeployment was in progress, gaps were left in the lines and the remnants of the German II Army which had been bottled up in a pocket near Danzig managed to escape across the Oder.

In the early hours of 16 April the Berlin Offensive Operation started with the objectives of capturing Berlin and linking up with Western Allied forces on the Elbe. The operation started with an assault on the Seelow Heights by 1BF and by Marshal Konev's 1st Ukrainian Front (1UF) to the south. Initially the 1BF had great difficulty smashing through the German lines of defence, but after three days they had broken through and were approaching the outskirts of Berlin. By 22 April 1BF had penetrated the northern and eastern suburbs of Berlin. They finished the encirclement of Berlin on 25 April when units of the 1BF and 1UF met at Kietzen west of Berlin. After heavy street-by-street and house to house fighting, General Weidling, the commander of Berlin's garrison, met with Marshal Chuikov and surrendered Berlin unconditionally at 15:00 hours local time on 2 May.

== Post-war ==
On 8 May, after a signing ceremony in Berlin, the German armed forces surrendered to the Allies unconditionally and the war in Europe was over. Following the war, the Front headquarters formed the Group of Soviet Forces in Germany.

== Commanders ==
The Front's Commissars included

- Lt. General Konstantin F. Telegin [continuing from Central Front] (October 1943 – May 1944; November 1944 – June 1945)
- Colonel General Nikolai A. Bulganin (May–November 1944)

=== 1945 time line ===
- 24 January: 1BF and 2nd Belorussian Fronts attack Pomerania. German II Army is cut off.
- 31 January: 1BF reaches the river Oder to the North of Küstrin and establishes a bridgehead on the western side less than 60 km from Berlin.
- 1 February: 1BF surrounds the fortress town of Küstrin.
- 2 February: 1BF reaches the Oder to the south of Frankfurt (Oder)
- 6 February: 1BF fans out along the east bank of the Oder between Frankfurt and Küstrin.
- 4 March: 1BF breaks through the German lines at Stargard and drives towards Stettin. It also establishes a new bridgehead across the Oder to the south of Frankfurt.
- 27 March: 1BF is involved in heavy street fighting in Danzig
- 28 March: 1BF captures Gotenhafen north of Danzig.
- 29 March: The fortress town of Küstrin falls to the 1BF after a siege lasting almost a month.
- 30 March: Soviet troops finally capture Danzig
- 16 April: 1BF and the 1st Ukrainian Front start the final offensive on Berlin from along the Oder-Neisse line.
- 17 April: The 1BF assault against Berlin is stalled by tenacious German resistance on the Seelow Heights, 3 km west of the Oder, with great losses of troops and tanks for the Soviets.
- 18 April: 1BF continues to batter the German position across the Seelow Heights in a battle of attrition.
- 19 April: 1BF breaks through the German defences on the Seelow Heights and moves rapidly towards Berlin.
- 22 April: 1BF penetrates the northern and eastern suburbs of Berlin.
- 25 April: Units of the 1BF and 1st Ukrainian Fronts meet at Kietzen west of Berlin. Berlin is now completely encircled by eight Russian armies.
- 30 April: Zhukov refuses to grant the defenders of Berlin an armistice and demands an unconditional surrender
- 2 May: General Weidling, the commander of Berlin's Garrison meets with Lieutenant General Vasily Chuikov and accepts his terms of unconditional surrender of Berlin. The garrison in Berlin surrenders at 3pm local time.
- 8 May: In deference to the Soviets, the surrender ceremony to the Western Allies at Rheims on the previous day is repeated before Marshal Zhukov and other Soviet generals at Karlshorst, a suburb of Berlin.
- 10 June: Front disbanded; its command transformed into the command of the Group of Soviet Forces in Germany.

== Component forces ==
The 1st Belorussian Front included:

- 61st Army
- 1st Polish Army
- 47th Army
- 3rd Shock Army
- 5th Shock Army
- 8th Guards Army
- 69th Army
- 33rd Army
- 16th Air Army
- 18th Air Army
- 1st Guards Tank Army
- 2nd Guards Tank Army
- 3rd Army
- 4th Artillery Corps
