= Battle of the Seelow Heights Memorial =

Memorial in Seelow, Germany

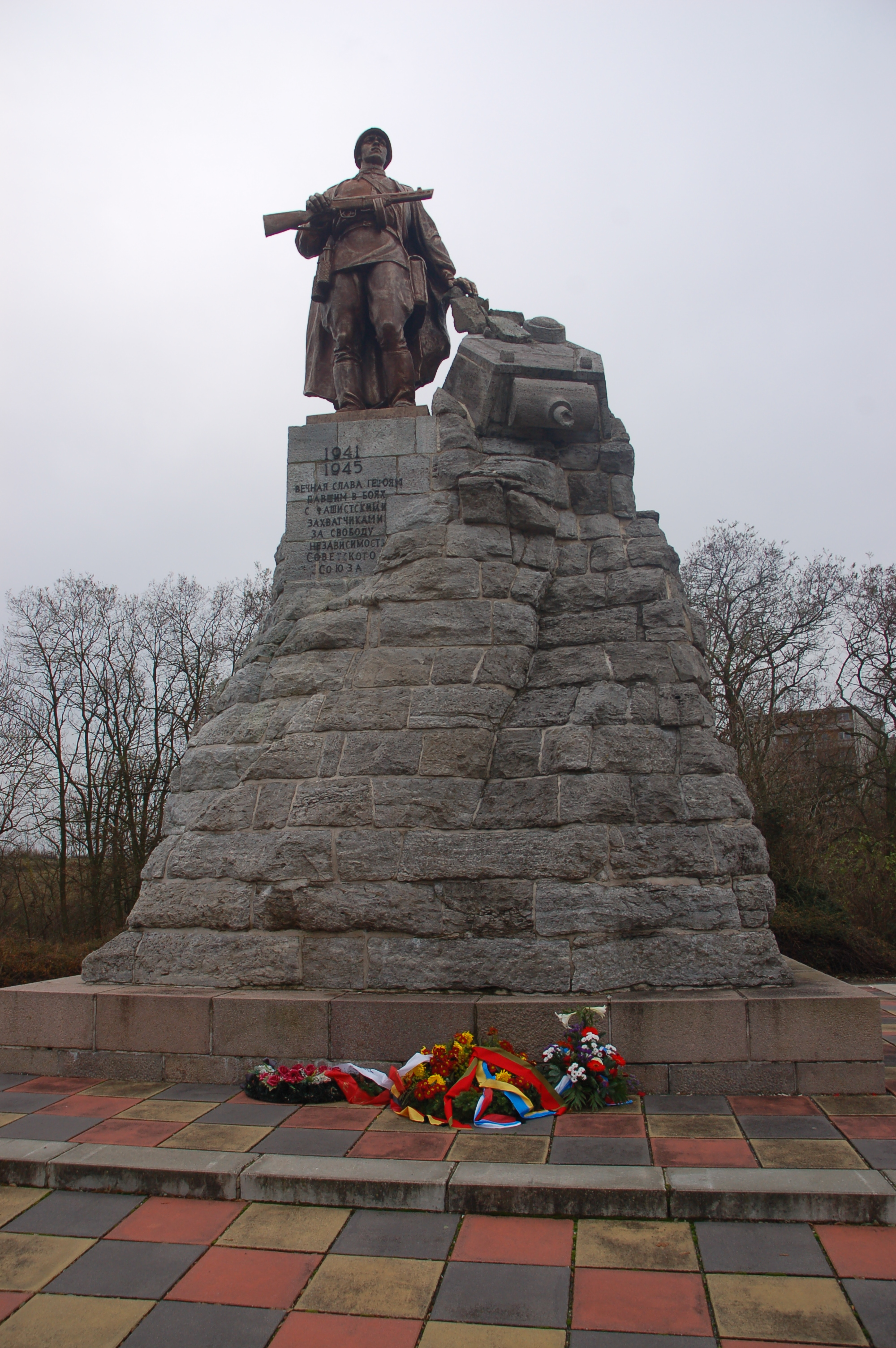
- Upper level of the memorial, front view
- Interactive map of Battle of the Seelow Heights Memorial
- Location: Seelow, 28a Küstriner Street
- Coordinates: 52°32′08″N 14°23′29″E
- Designer: Lev Kerbel
- Height: 3.9 m (13 ft)
- Beginning date: 1945
- Opening date: 27 November 1945
- Restored date: 1972 – Opening of the Seelow Heights museum; 1985 – Museum expansion; 2003 – Museum renovation and construction of an Orthodox church
- Dedicated to: Soviet soldiers of the Battle of the Seelow Heights

The Battle of the Seelow Heights Memorial commemorates the Soviet soldiers who fought in the Battle of the Seelow Heights. Located at 28a Küstriner Street in Seelow, Germany, the memorial and its adjacent cemetery are maintained by the city of Seelow and the associated museum. The memorial consists of two levels: the lower level contains graves, while the upper level features a statue of a Soviet soldier.

== History ==
In November 1945, three memorials honoring fallen Soviet soldiers were unveiled along German National Road No. 1. On 11 November, the Soviet War Memorial in Tiergarten was dedicated; on 17 November, a memorial at the Prussian King Bastion in Kostrzyn nad Odrą was unveiled; and on 27 November, the Battle of the Seelow Heights Memorial was officially dedicated. The unveilings were attended by military delegations from the four victorious Allied powers.

The monument is situated on a Soviet soldiers' cemetery in Seelow. On 8 December 1946, the cemetery was placed under the care of the city.

In 1972, the authorities of East Germany expanded the area around the memorial and opened a museum. During the museum's construction, the cemetery and statue were restored.

In 1977, an APM-90 searchlight, used during the battle, was installed at the cemetery entrance.

In 1995, the exhibition building unveiled its first publications.

In 2003, a simple Orthodox church was constructed behind the memorial. Inside the church, a cross bears the inscription "Детям России от матери церкви" ("To the children of Russia from the Mother Church").

The museum grounds currently span 6 hectares.

The memorial remains a place of remembrance for fallen soldiers. On Victory Day (9 May) and the anniversary of the battle's start (16 April), it serves as a gathering place for war veterans, primarily from former Soviet Union countries (Russia and Belarus), as well as Poland and Germany.

Lower level of the memorial
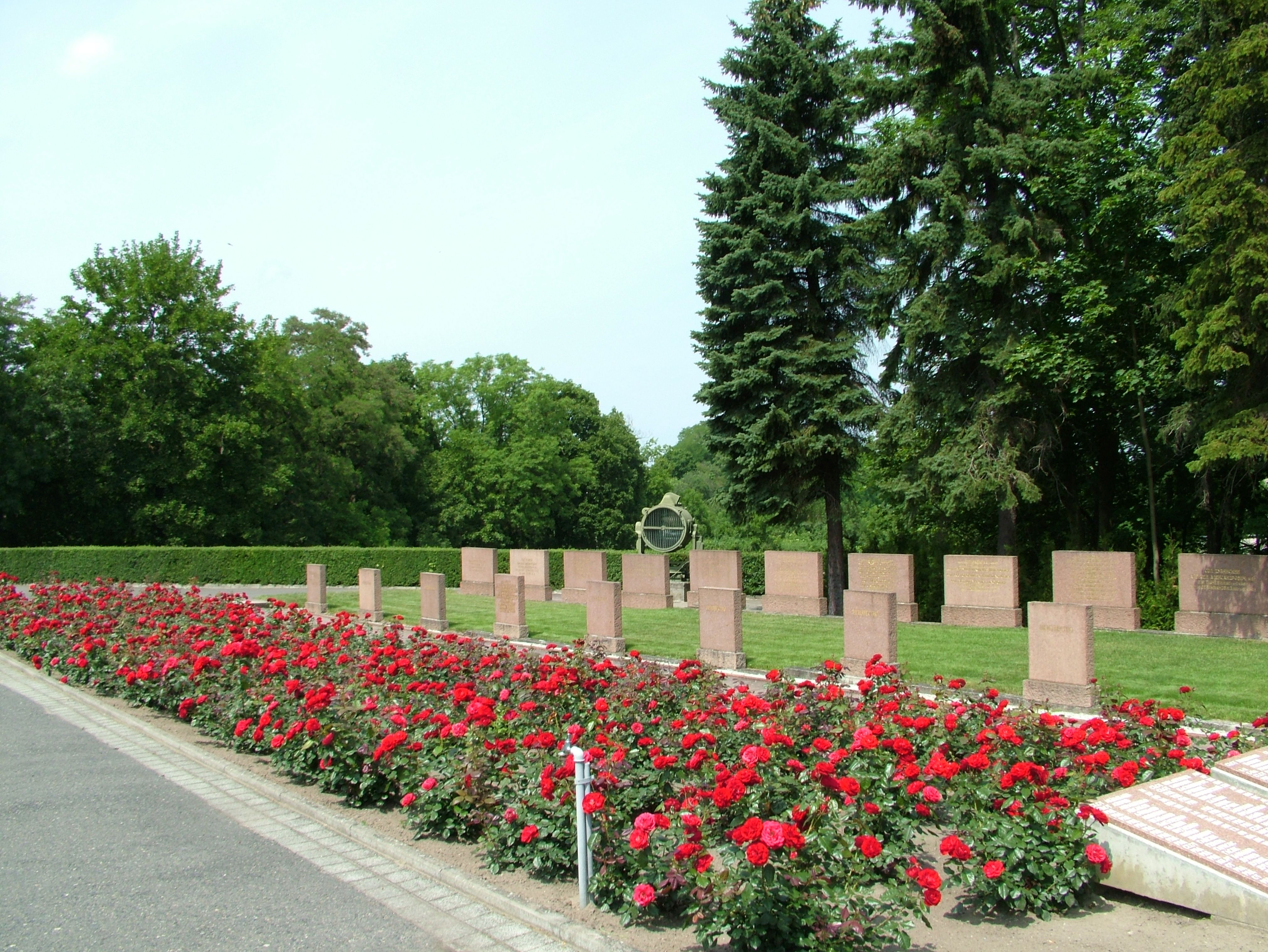
Graves of soldiers at the Seelow Heights. In the background, an APM-90 searchlight used during the attack on the Seelow Heights

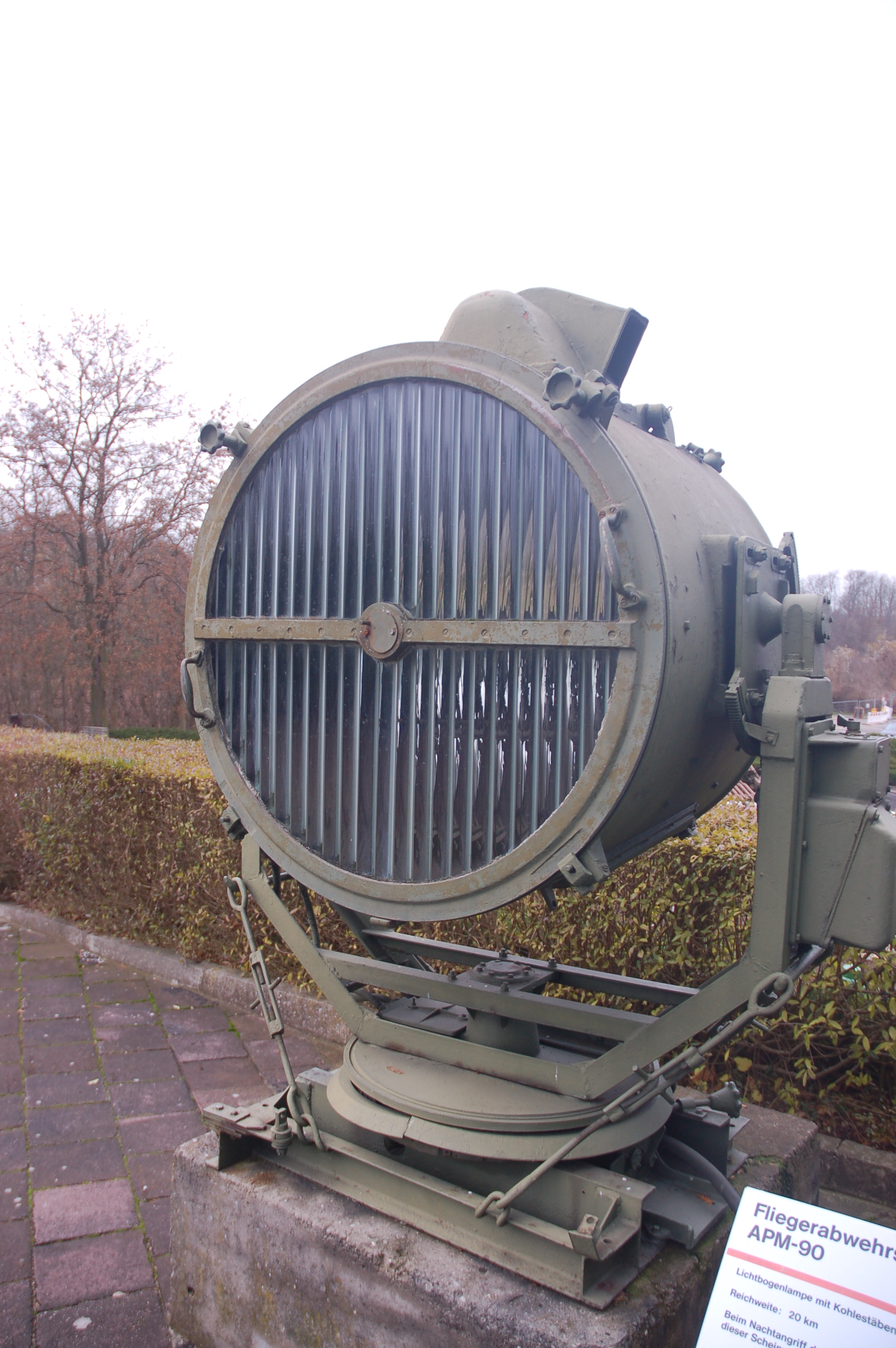
Close-up of the APM-90 searchlight

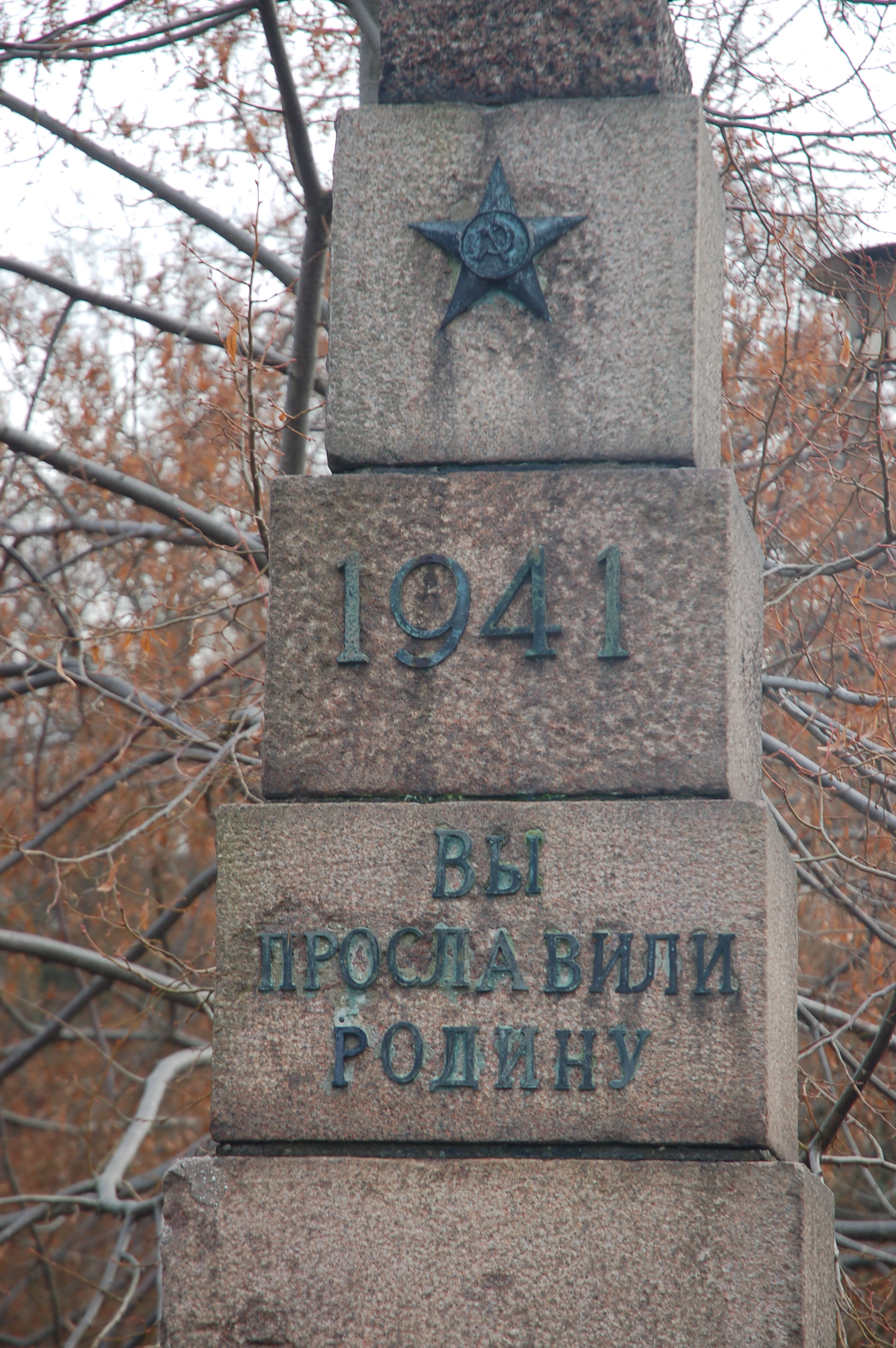
One of the obelisks

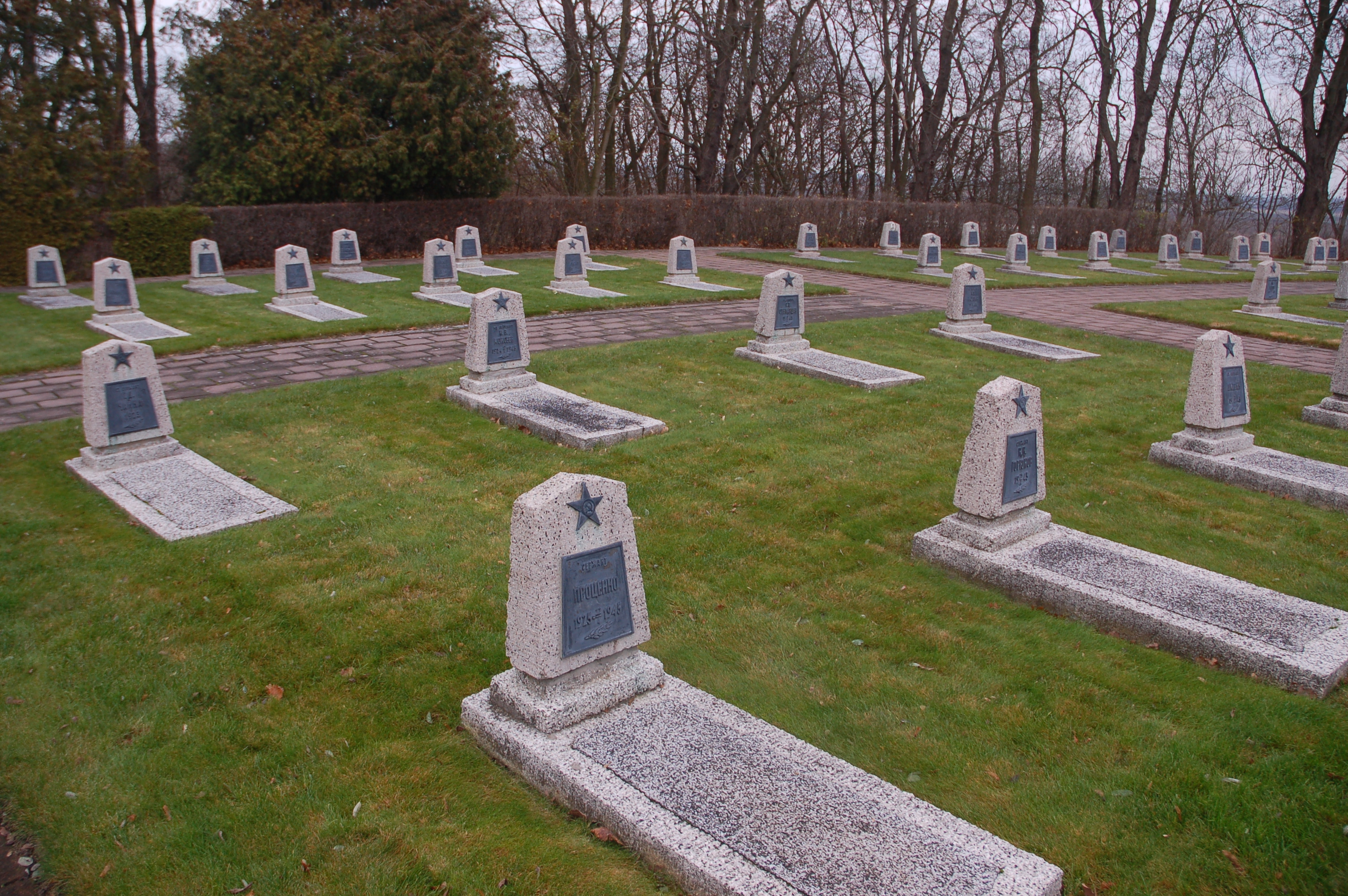
First level of the memorial

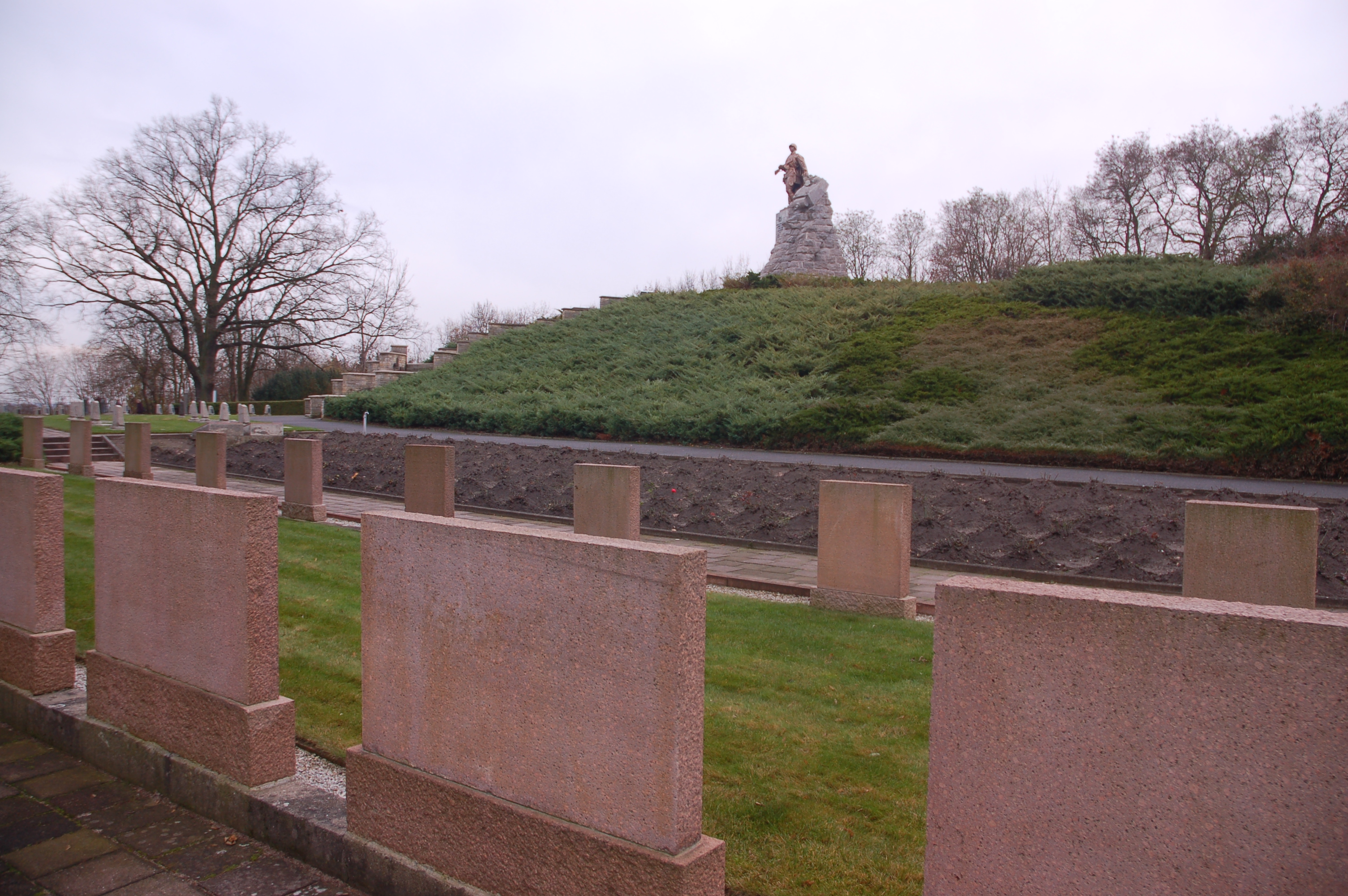
Graves of fallen soldiers

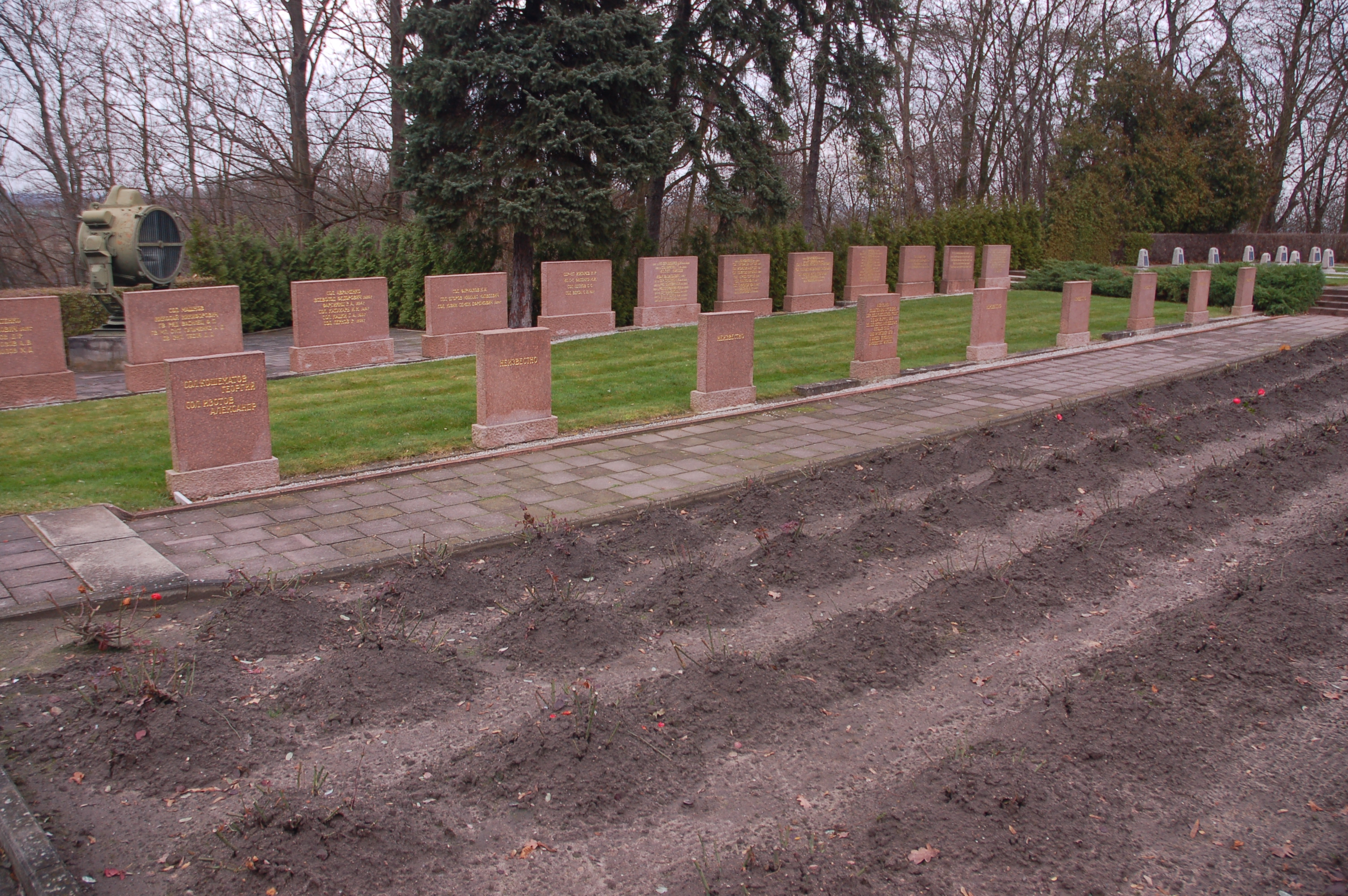
Graves of fallen soldiers

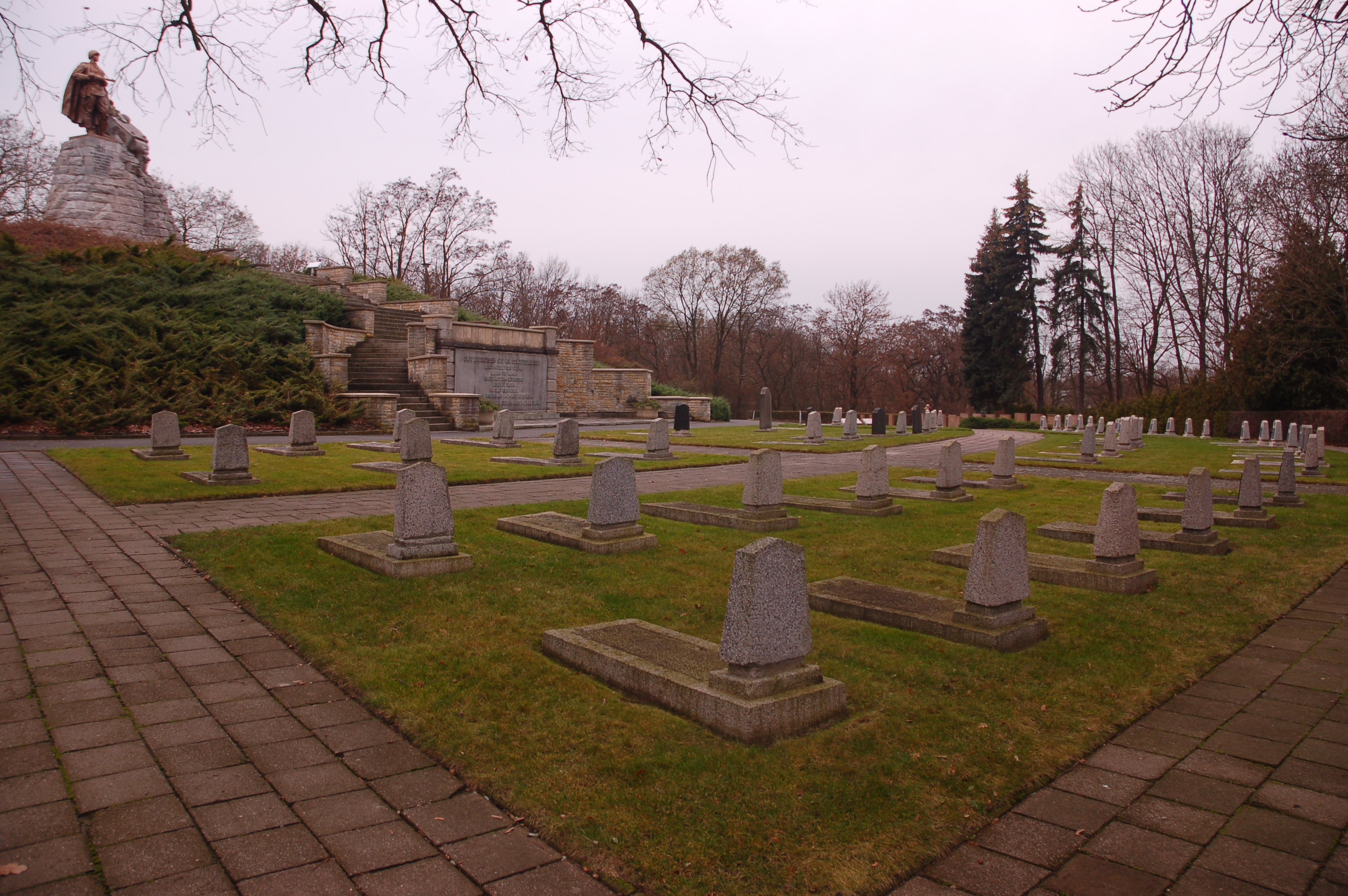
Graves of fallen soldiers

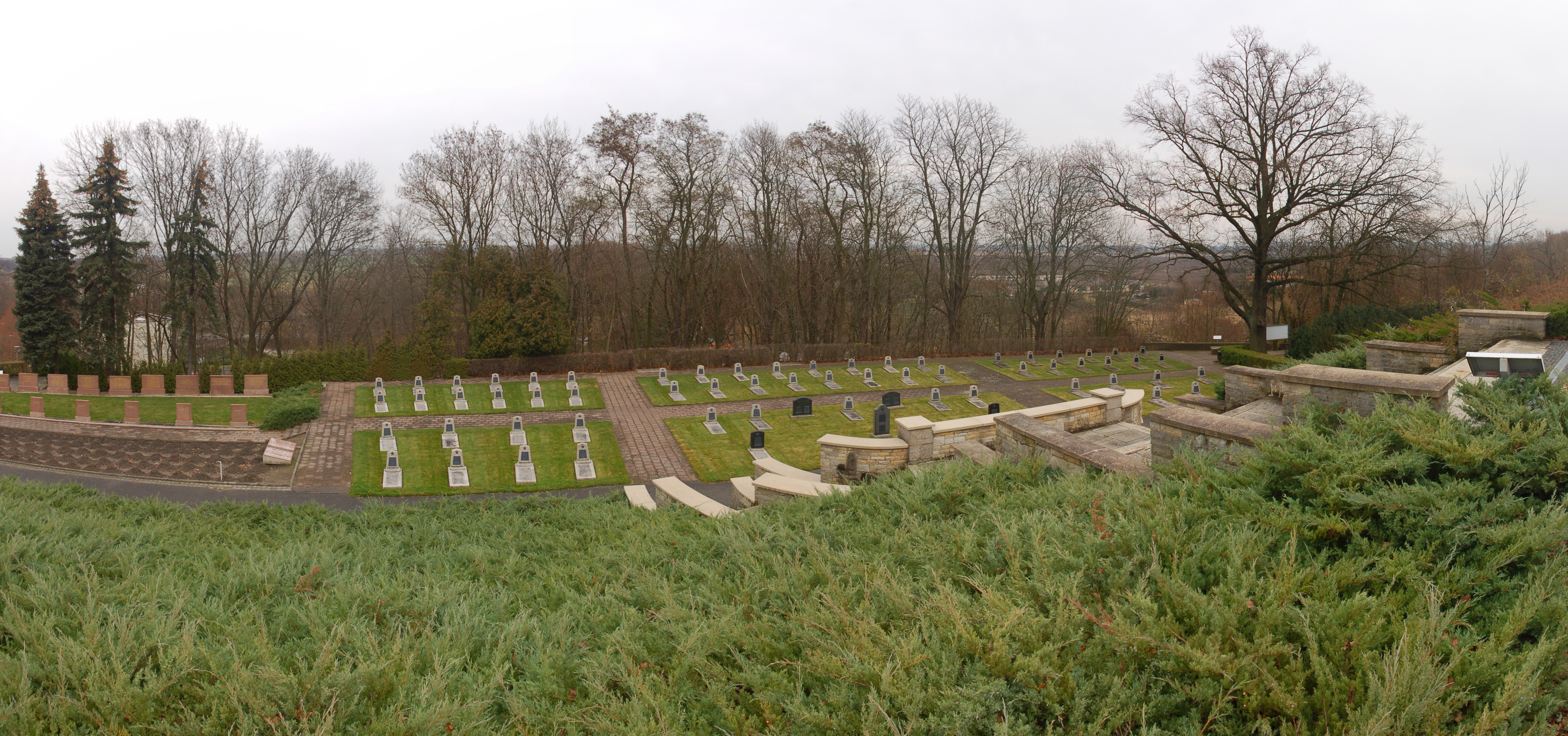
Graves of fallen soldiers (view from above)

== Design and construction ==
The memorial, designed by Lev Kerbel, was erected in 1945 on the orders of Marshal Georgy Zhukov, who stated, "The path of war must be commemorated". It honors the soldiers of the Red Army who fought in the battle.

The memorial is structured on two levels. The lower level contains the graves of 66 soldiers (60 individual graves and 3 double graves). The upper level features a bronze statue of a Red Army soldier, cast in 20 copies. The rest of the monument is made of granite sourced from Fürstenberg. The statue depicts a Soviet soldier holding a PPSh submachine gun across his chest, with two grenades at his side, gazing at the graves of his fallen comrades to the left. Below the statue, a plaque bears the Russian inscription: "1941 – 1945 вечная слава героям павшим в боях с фашистскими захватчиками за свободу и независимость Советского Союза" ("1941 – 1945 Eternal glory to the heroes who fell in battles against the fascist invaders for the freedom and independence of the Soviet Union"). To the right of the statue is a tank turret (without its barrel). The monument weighs approximately 1.5 tonnes.

Two obelisks stand at the cemetery entrance. The left obelisk bears the inscription (translated): "1941 To the glory of the homeland", while the right one reads: "1945 The homeland will never forget you".

== Museum ==
The museum comprises an open-air exhibition of Soviet military equipment, including an M1938 mortar, 76 mm divisional gun M1942 (ZiS-3), BM-13 Katyusha, 152 mm howitzer M1943 (D-1), a T-34/85 tank, and an APM-90 searchlight used during the attack. The exhibition building houses publications, one of which details the actions of the First Polish Army. It also displays German and Soviet uniforms, personal equipment, and photographs. Two documentary films about the battle are shown: Schlachtfeld vor Berlin (available in German, English, Russian, French, and Polish) and Requiem für Millionen (available only in German).

Following its 1985 renovation, the museum's exterior resembles Marshal Zhukov's headquarters in Reitwein.

The museum also maintains an archive containing publications and eyewitness accounts of the battle.

Upper level of the memorial
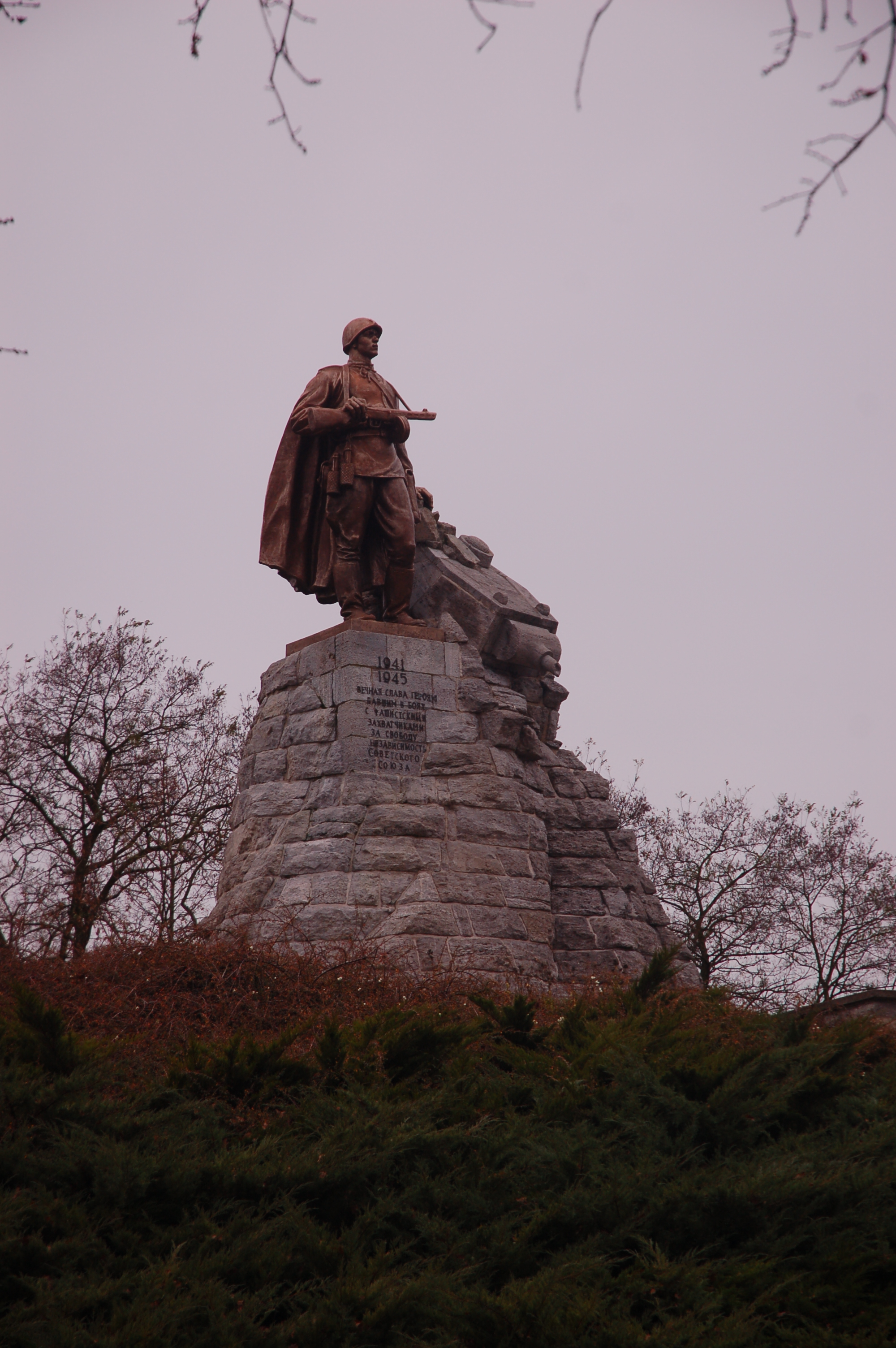
Photograph taken from the lower part of the memorial

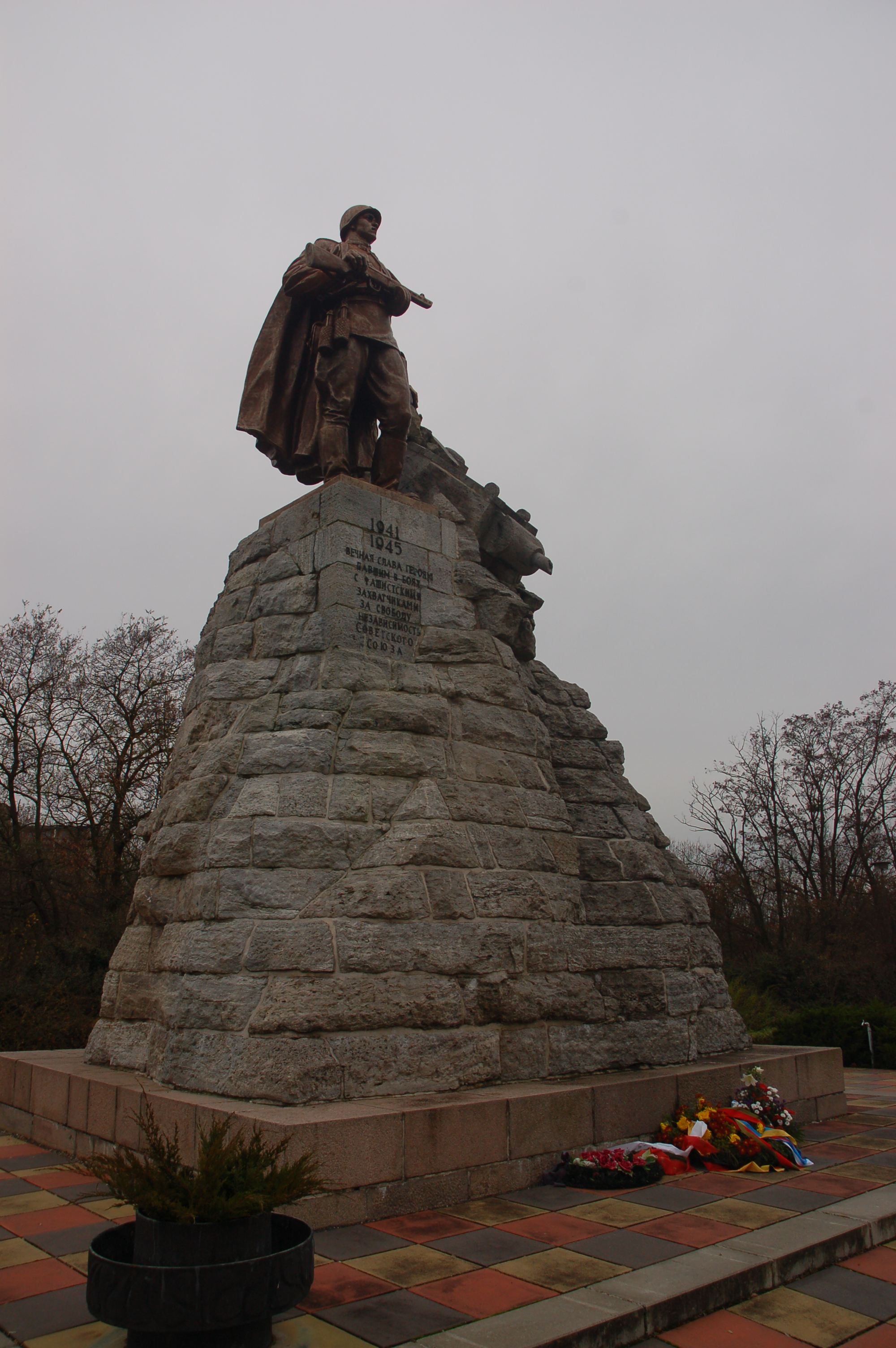
Side view of the memorial

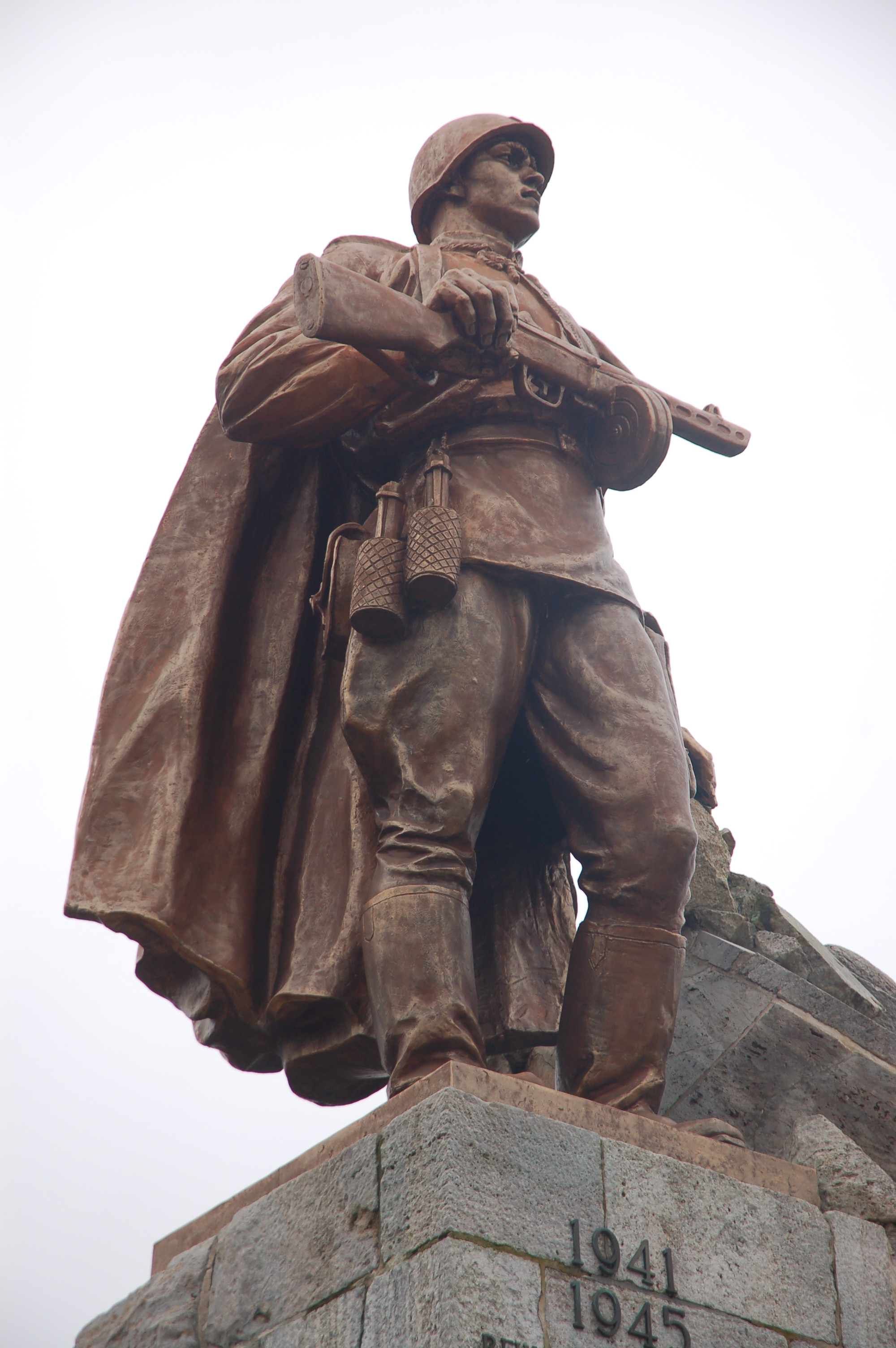
Close-up of the bronze Red Army soldier statue

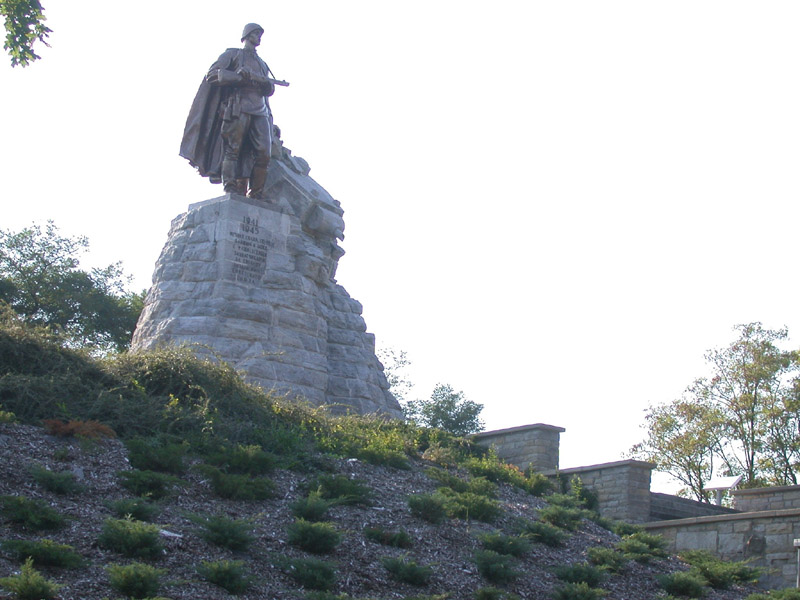
Photograph taken from the lower part of the memorial

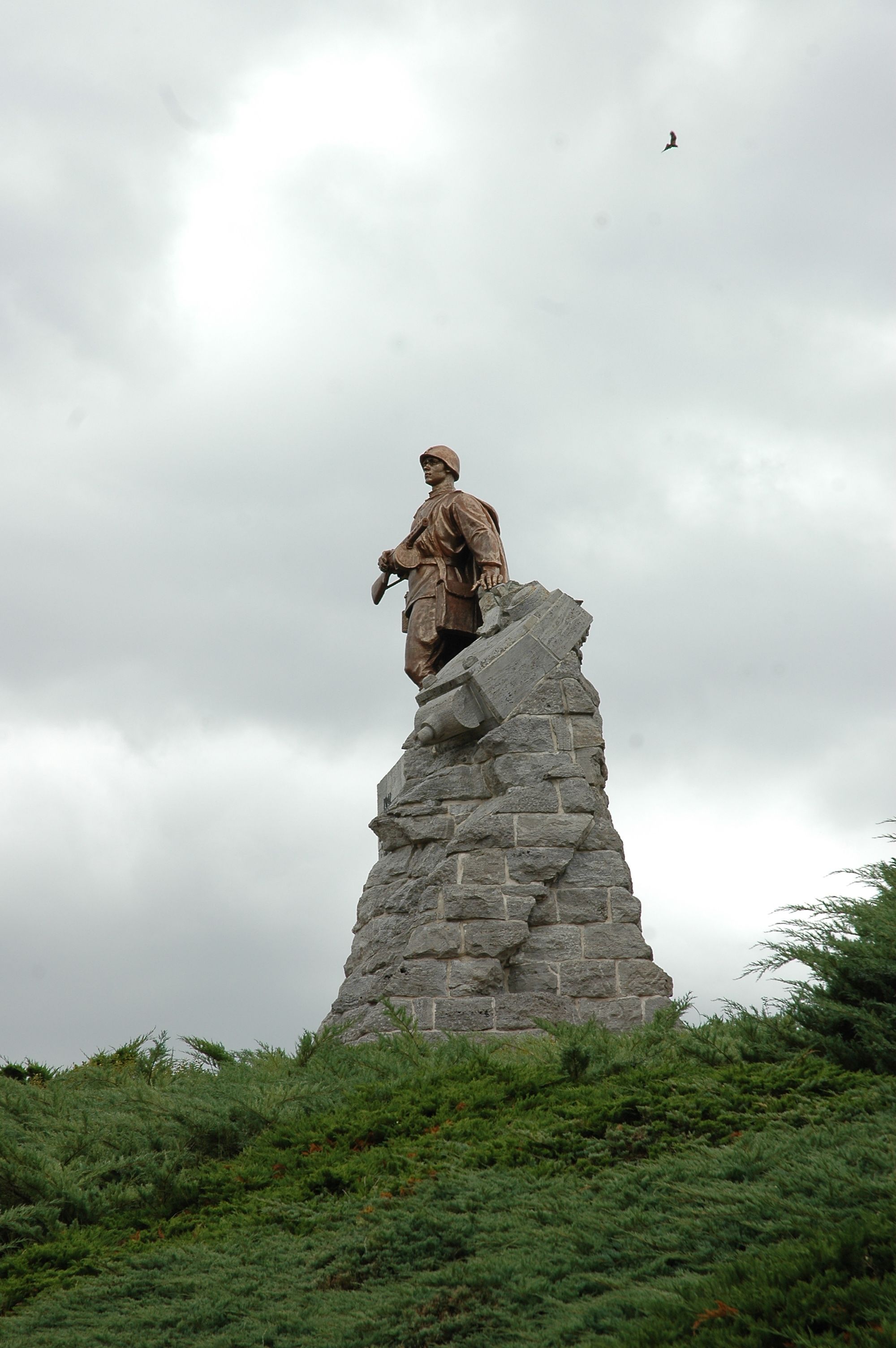
Photograph taken from the lower part of the memorial
Exhibits
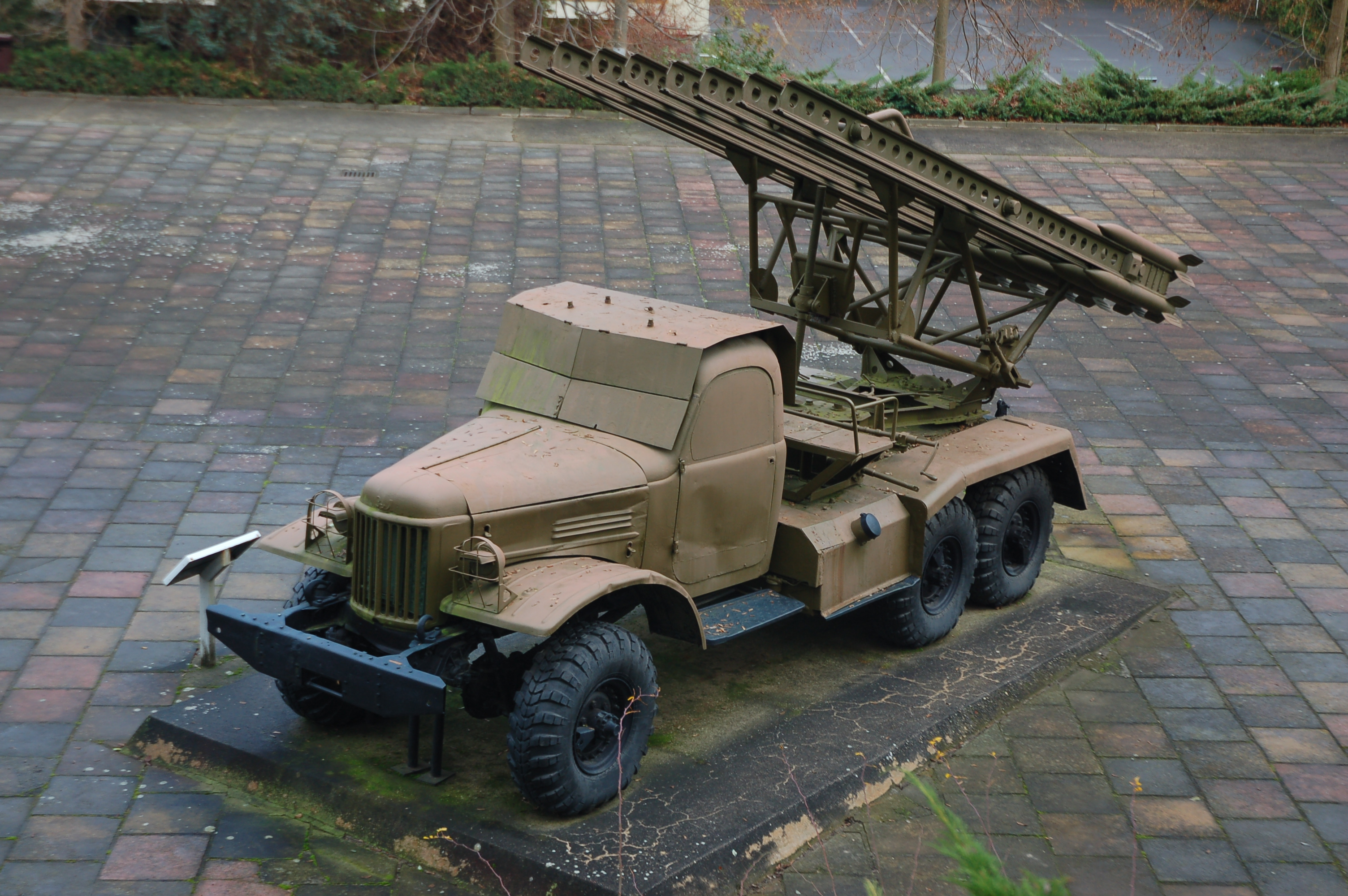
BM-13 Katyusha rocket launcher, top view

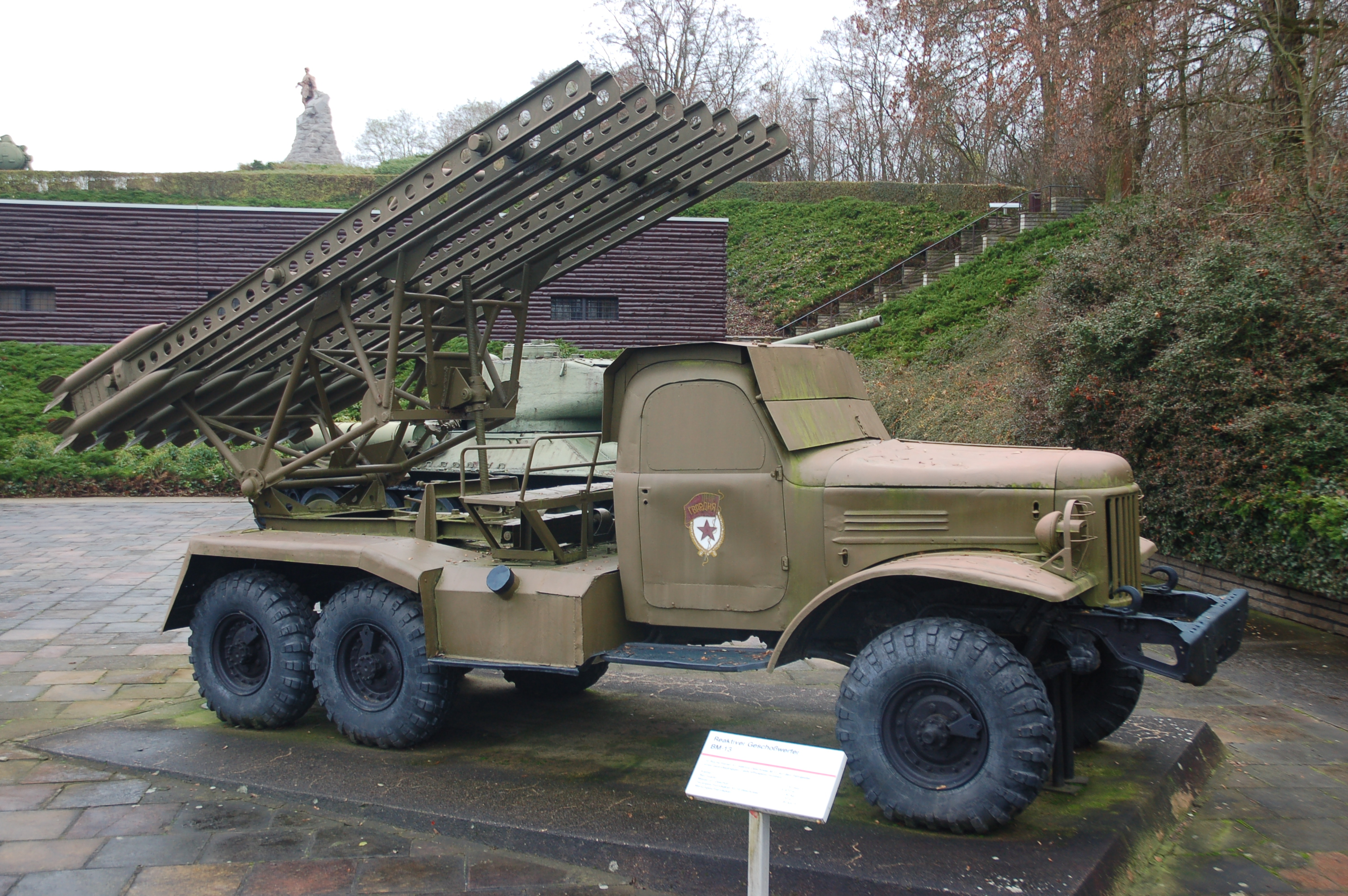
BM-13 Katyusha rocket launcher, side view

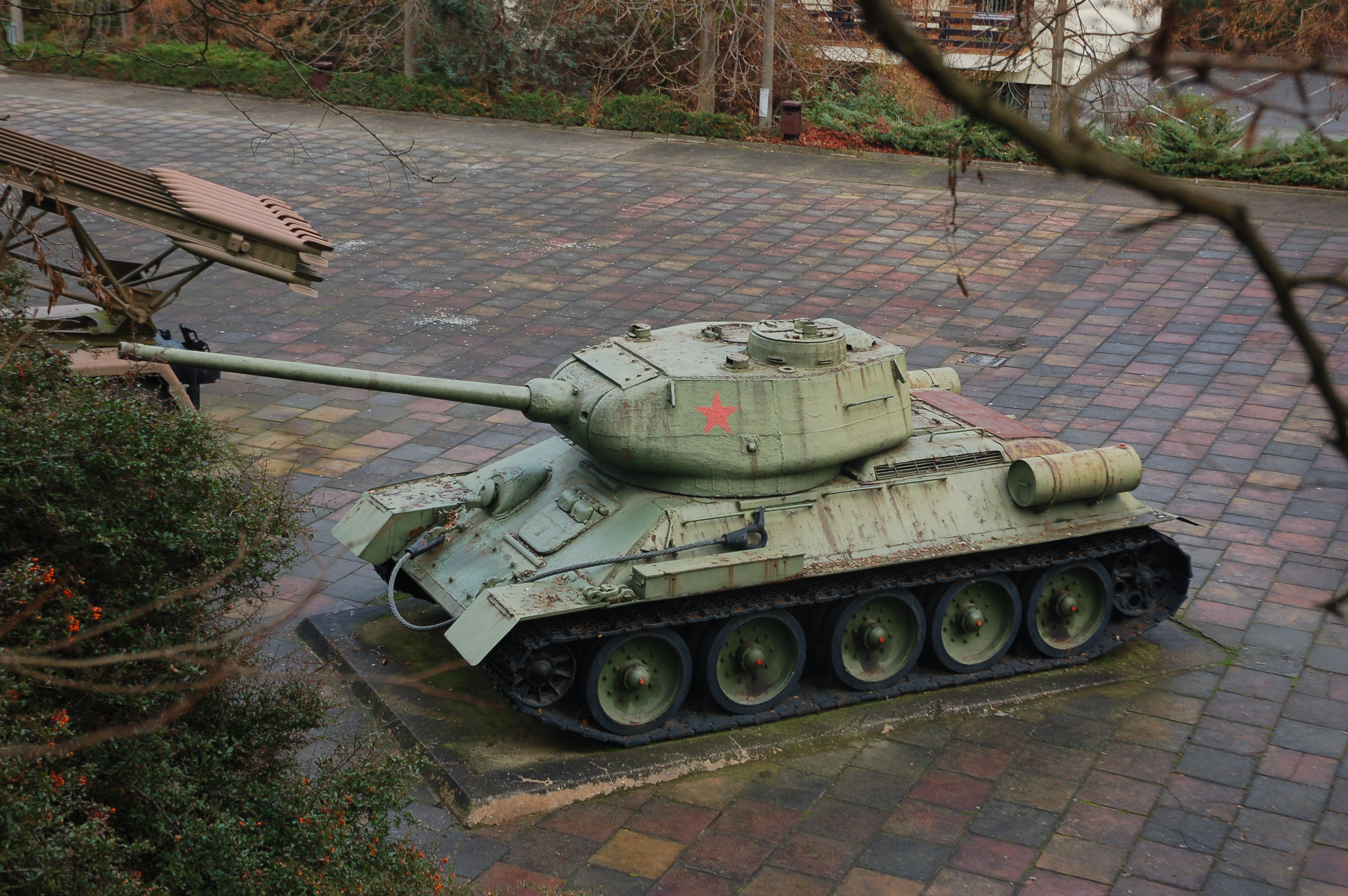
T-34/85 tank, top view

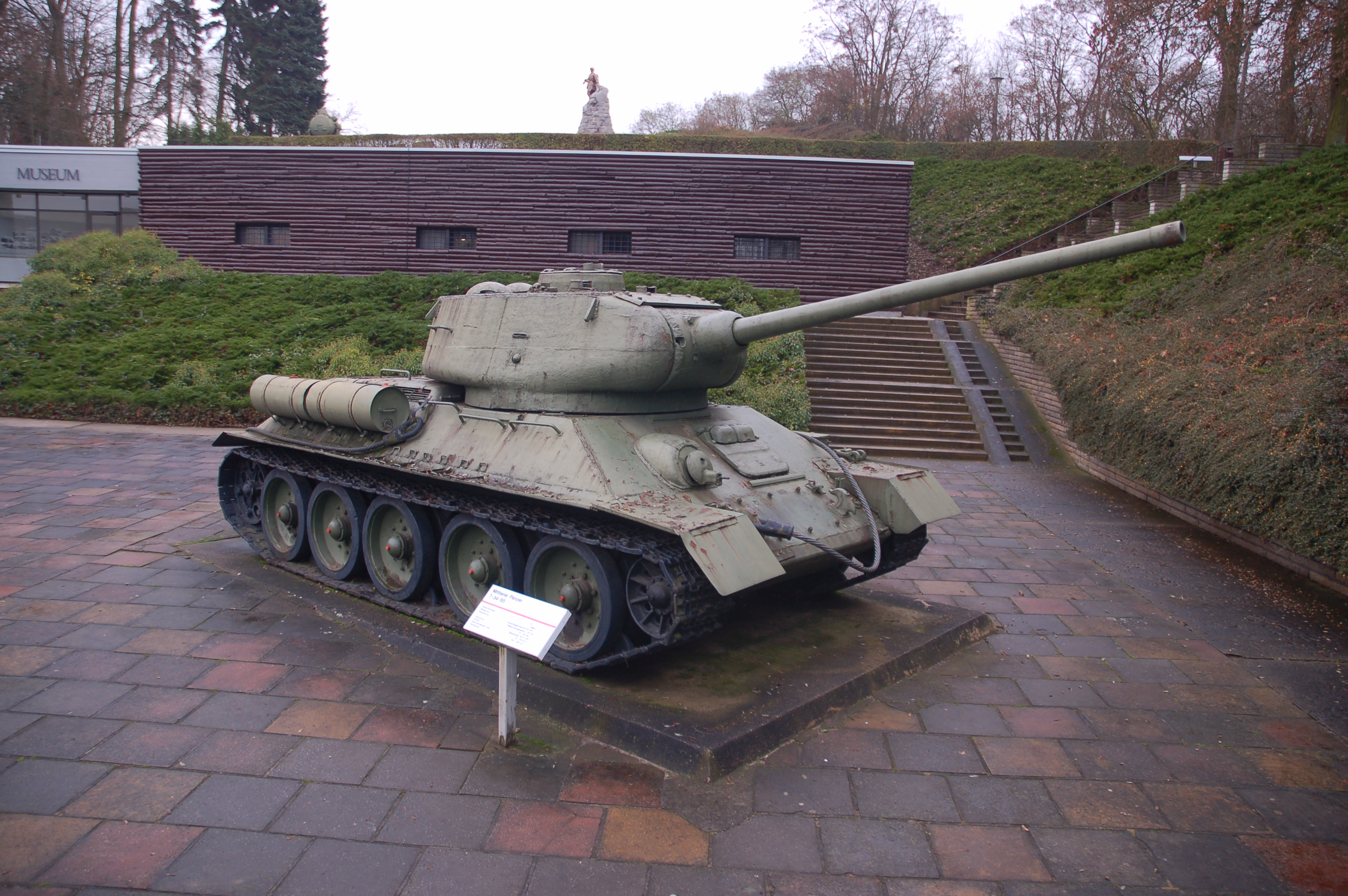
T-34/85 tank, side view

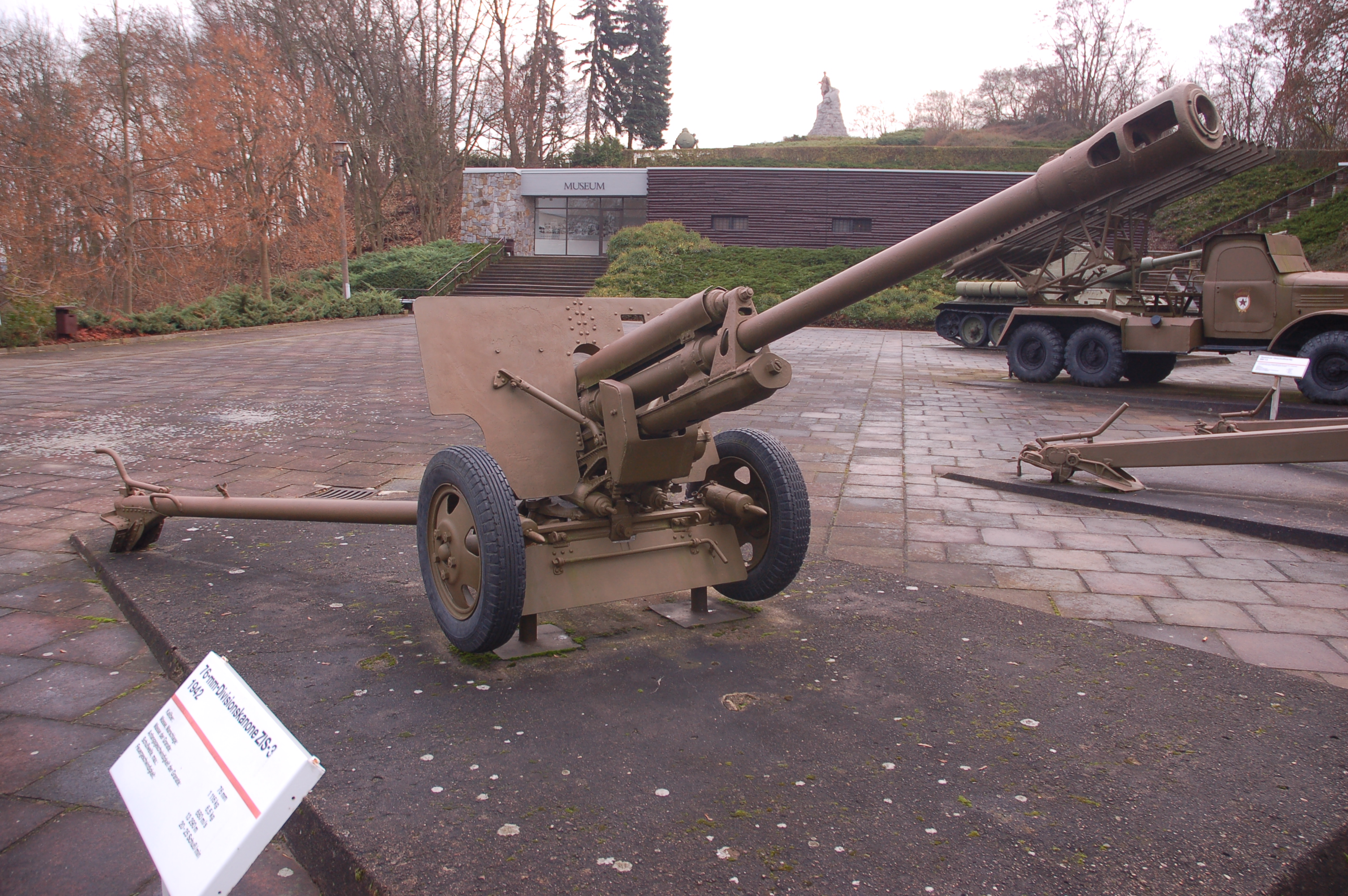
76 mm divisional gun M1942 (ZiS-3)

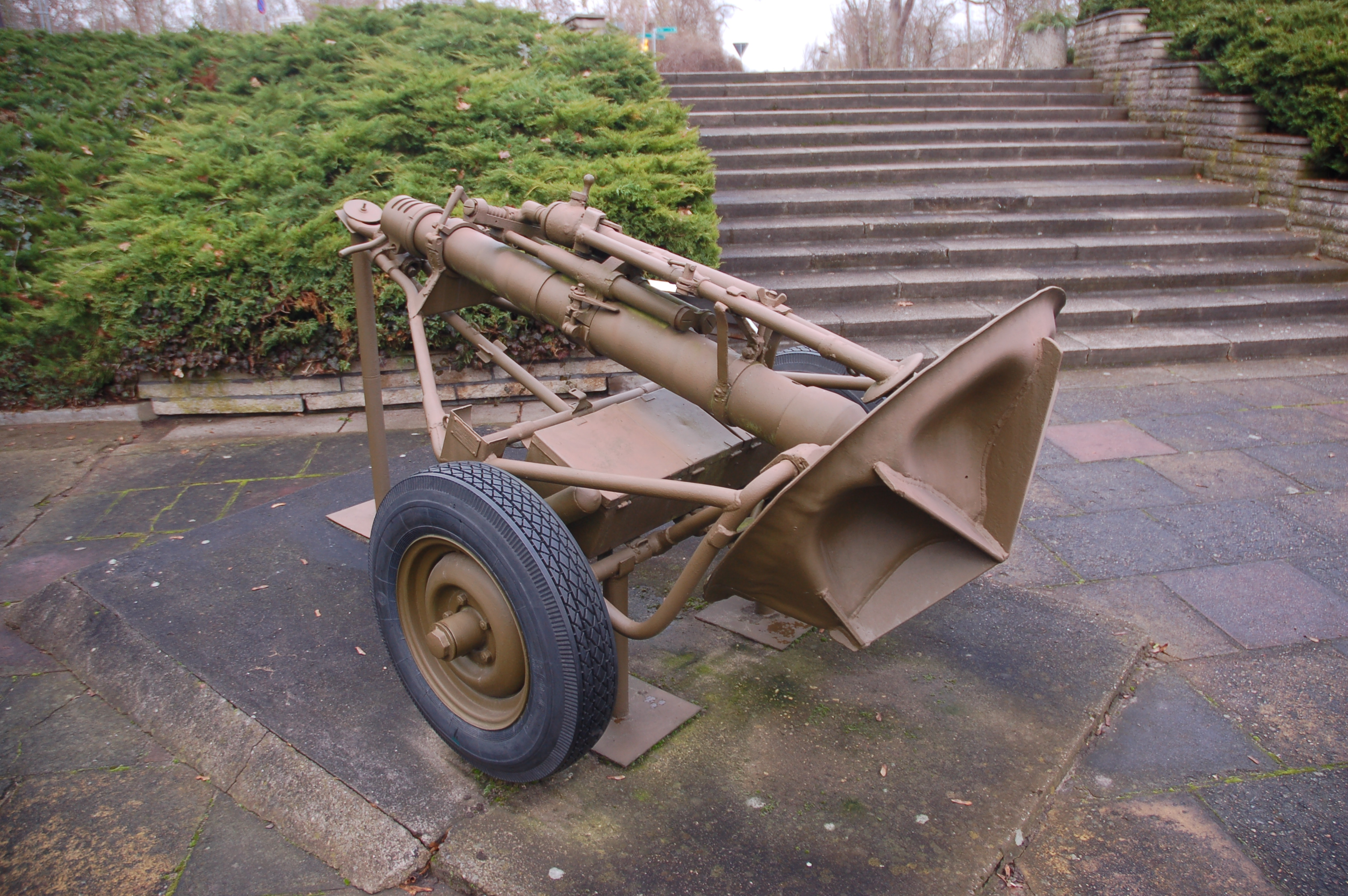
M1938 mortar

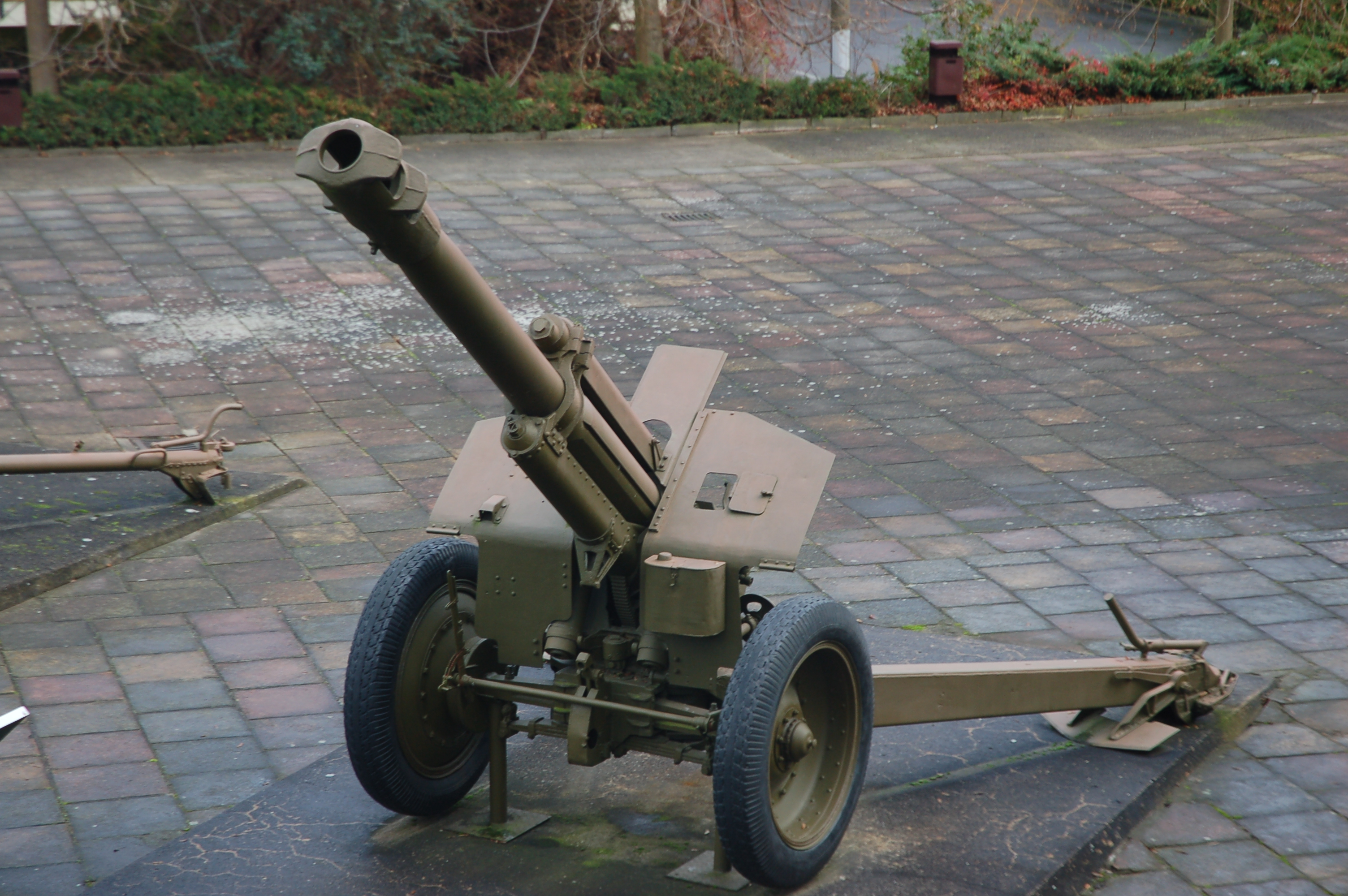
152 mm howitzer M1943 (D-1)

== See also ==
- Seelow Heights
- Soviet War Memorial (Treptower Park)
