= Field entrenchment =

Field entrenchment is the activity of provision of cover and concealment, usually by the infantry arm of service, possibly with assistance from combat engineers or sappers. The entrenched position is intended to be a temporary one, taking maybe a day to create and to be held for no more than a week. However, during World War I these entrenched positions were progressively made more sophisticated over longer periods, leading to their evolution into tactical, operational and strategic stalemates and the emergence of trench warfare.

== See also ==
- Battle of the Seelow Heights (16 April–2 May 1945)
