= Konstantin Telegin =

- Born: 3 November 1899; Tatarsk, Tomsk Governorate, Russian Empire
- Died: 16 November 1981 (aged 82); Moscow, Russian SFSR, Soviet Union
- Burial place: Novodevichy Cemetery
- Military career
- Allegiance: Soviet Union (1918–1956)
- Service years: 1918–1956
- Rank: Lieutenant General
- Commands: Red Army
- Conflicts: Russian Civil War; Soviet–Japanese Border Wars; World War II; Winter War; Eastern Front

Konstantin Fedorovich Telegin (Russian: Константин Федорович Телегин, 3 November [O.S. 22 October] 1899 – 16 November 1981) was a Soviet general and a political officer.

== Biography ==
=== Early life ===
Telegin joined the Red Army in 1918 and fought in the Russian Civil War, becoming a member of the Russian Communist Party (Bolsheviks) in 1919. He served as a Regimental Commissar assistant. In 1931 he graduated from the Lenin Military-Political Academy. At first he was a political officer in the NKVD, and later was transferred to the Army. He was present at the Battle of Lake Khasan and took part in the Winter War. In 1940 he returned to the NKVD, and soon was assigned to the army again. On the eve of the German invasion he was a Brigade Commissar.

=== World War II ===
Telegin was a member of the Defense Council of Moscow during the battle for the city. His most important role was as Chief Commissar, first in the Don Front and afterwards in the Central Front (Later renamed 1st Belorussian), where he became a close associate and a friend of Marshal Zhukov. Telegin took part in the battles of Stalingrad, Kursk, the Dniepr, Belarus, Poland, Pomerania and Berlin. He was present at the signing of the German Instrument of Surrender and a member of the commission tasked with identifying the remains of Hitler and the Goebbels family. He served as Zhukov's deputy in the Group of Soviet Forces in Germany.

=== Trial and rehabilitation ===
His close ties with Zhukov incurred Stalin's displeasure, and Telegin was dismissed from the Army in 1947. On 24 January 1948 he was arrested on the premier's personal orders and put on trial for alleged corruption, alongside Zhukov. He was condemned to 25 years in prison.

After Stalin's death he was rehabilitated and returned to the Army in July 1953. Telegin retired to his Dacha in 1956, holding the rank of lieutenant general. He wrote several books on military affairs and his memoirs, Войны несчитанные вёрсты (War's Uncountable Leagues), the latter published in 1975. When he died of a heart attack, the Central Committee wished to bury him in the Kremlin Wall, but his family declined.

== Honours and awards ==
- three Orders of Lenin
- Order of Suvorov 1st class
- Order of the Red Star
- Medal "For the Victory over Germany in the Great Patriotic War 1941–1945"
- Honorary Citizen of Tatarsk, Novosibirsk Oblast
