= Staraya Bezginka =

Staraya Bezginka Старая Безгинка
- Selo
- Location within Belgorod Oblast Location within Russia
- Coordinates: 50°51′N 38°09′E
- Country: Russia
- Region: Belgorod Oblast
- District: Novooskolsky District
- Time zone: UTC+3:00

Staraya Bezginka (Russian: Старая Безгинка) is a rural locality (a selo) and the administrative center of Starobezginskoye Rural Settlement, Novooskolsky District, Belgorod Oblast, Russia. The population was 671 as of 2010. There are 5 streets.

== Geography ==
Staraya Bezginka is located 28 km northeast of Novy Oskol (the district's administrative centre) by road. Bolshaya Ivanovka is the nearest rural locality.
