= Kalinkovichi–Mozyr Operation =

Kalinkovichi–Mozyr Offensive Operation (1944)
- Part of the Eastern Front of World War II
Date	January 8–30, 1944
Location	Belorussian Soviet Socialist Republic, Gomel Region
Result	Soviet victory

Belligerents
Soviet Union	Germany; Hungary

Commanders and leaders
Konstantin Rokossovskiy	Ernst Busch; Walter Weiß

Strength
232,600 personnel	Unknown

Casualties and losses
Irrecoverable losses: 12,350; Sanitary losses: 43,807	According to German data, the 2nd German Army lost from 1 to 31 January 1944: Killed: 1,079; Sanitary losses: 4,347; Captured or missing: 438; Total losses: 5,864

The Kalinkovichi–Mozyr Offensive Operation (January 8–30, 1944) was an offensive operation of the Soviet troops of the Belorussian Front in the Eastern Front of World War II.

== Operation plan ==
In the Winter Campaign of 1943–1944, the Soviet Command set the goal of defeating German troops in the eastern regions of the Belorussian Soviet Socialist Republic and liberating Minsk. The battles in November–December of 1943 (Gomel–Rechitsa Operation, Vitebsk Operation of 1943) showed that without a decisive strengthening of the grouping of Soviet troops in this direction, these tasks cannot be solved. Therefore, the new plans were brought to more realistic goals. In particular, on January 2, 1944, the Stavka of the Supreme High Command set the following task for the Belorussian Front (commander Army General Konstantin Rokossovskiy): to defeat the enemy group in the Mozyr Region, create a bridgehead for an offensive in the direction of Bobruysk–Minsk, and with part of the forces to advance along the Pripyat River to Luninets, to achieve the maximum possible advance to envelop the enemy group in Bobruysk.

The operation involved the 61st Army (commander Lieutenant General Pavel Belov), the 65th Army (commander Lieutenant General Pavel Batov), and a significant portion of the 16th Air Army (commander Colonel General Sergey Rudenko). For the operation, Rokossovskiy decisively strengthened units of both armies at the expense of other troops of the front – the 65th Army had 10 rifle divisions and the 1st Guards Tank Corps (126 tanks and self–propelled artillery units), the 61st Army had 6 rifle divisions and a tank brigade. The 2nd Guards Cavalry Corps and the 7th Guards Cavalry Corps were transferred to the operational subordination of the commander of the 61st Army. Almost all of the front's strike artillery was also concentrated there: a breakthrough artillery corps, two breakthrough artillery divisions, one mortar division, and two separate artillery brigades. The number of Soviet troops amounted to 232,600 people. Partisans from the Gomel, Polese and Minsk Partisan Units were also involved in the operation.

The Soviet troops were opposed by the 2nd German Army (commanded by General of Infantry Walter Weiß) from Army Group Centre (commanded by Field Marshal Ernst Busch). After the defeat in the Smolensk Operation, German troops from October 1943 created a defense using numerous rivers and swamps. In this direction, 9 infantry and 2 tank divisions, 3 assault gun divizions, and a cavalry regiment were on the defensive. In the rear were several Hungarian Divisions used to fight the partisans, who were also thrown into battle during the battle.

== Course of operation ==
On January 8, 1944, Soviet troops began an offensive. At the initial stage, the fighting took on a stubborn character and in the first days of the operation, Soviet troops had difficulty pushing through the German defenses. The introduction of a tank corps into battle did not produce the desired result. However, after breaking through the forward defensive line, Rokossovskiy brought two cavalry corps into battle south of Mozyr: the 2nd and 7th Guards Cavalry Corps. Belorussian partisans led them along forest roads from the Elsk Region to the rear of the Mozyr and Kalinkovichi enemy groups. The cavalrymen paralyzed the German rear, cut off the Mozyr–Petrikov Road, and deprived the defending German units of supplies. The German Command was forced to begin withdrawing its troops.

Having launched a decisive attack at this moment, both advancing Soviet armies achieved significant success. The 61st Army cut the Kalinkovichi–Zhlobin Railway and Highway, liberated Domanovichi and bypassed the enemy group from the north. The 65th Army, which was advancing to the south, also advanced quickly. On January 11, Rokossovskiy changed the direction of attacks of the cavalry and tank corps in order to disorient the enemy. In many ways he succeeded. On the afternoon of January 14, the main strongholds of the enemy's defense and transport hubs – the cities of Kalinkovichi and Mozyr – were taken by storm with the assistance of partisans. Continuing the offensive, the troops of the 65th Army liberated the city of Ozarichi on January 20, and the 61st Army and partisans liberated the city of Lelchitsy on January 23.

With the arrival of Soviet troops on the Ipa, Pripyat and Ptich Rivers, the Soviet offensive was stopped. By that time, the enemy had transferred up to 2 infantry divisions, 3 assault gun divizions, and 7 security battalions to the offensive area. As a result of the Kalinkovichi–Mozyr Operation, Soviet troops advanced through forested and marshy terrain by a total of 30–40 kilometers, and in some areas by up to 60 kilometers. The enemy's Bobruysk Group was surrounded from the south, which later facilitated its defeat during the Belorussian Strategic Operation. According to German General Kurt Tippelskirch, in mid–January 1944, the 2nd German Army was under threat of complete encirclement and only at the cost of enormous efforts did the German Command manage to pull it out from under attack. The German units suffered heavy losses (for example, according to Soviet estimates, their losses in the Battles for Mozyr alone amounted to 1,500 people killed, and the soldiers of the 65th Army destroyed up to 10 thousand German soldiers and officers during the operation). The losses of the Soviet troops amounted to 12,350 irrecoverable losses and 43,808 sanitary losses.

The actions of the troops of the Belorussian Front differed favorably from the actions of the neighboring Western and 2nd Baltic Fronts, which that winter made little progress near Vitebsk with heavy losses. The close connection between the front command and the partisan detachments and their competent use played a major role in the success of the offensive. Twenty–one military units received the honorary title «of Kalinkovichi», another 18 received the honorary title «of Mozyr».

== Sources ==
- Konstantin Rokossovskiy. Soldier's Duty – 5th Edition – Moskva: Military Publishing House of the Ministry of Defense of the Union of Soviet Socialist Republics. 1988 – 367 Pages – Military Memoirs – ISBN 5-203-00489-7
- The Great Patriotic War of 1941–1945: In 12 Volumes. Volume 4: Liberation of the Territory of the Union of Soviet Socialist Republics. 1944 – Moskva: Kuchkovo Pole, 2012 – Pages 130–135 – ISBN 978-5-9950-0286-4
- History of the Great Patriotic War of the Soviet Union (1941–1945): In 6 Volumes – Moskva: Military Publishing House of the Ministry of Defense of the Union of Soviet Socialist Republics. 1960–1965. Volume 4
- Dmitriy Lomonosov. Kalinkovichi–Mozyr Operation (December 1943 – January 1944) // Military History Archive – 2001 – No. 6 – Pages 57–69
- Mikhail Panov. In the Battles for Kalinkovichi // Military History Journal – 1978 – No. 5 – Pages 46–51
