= Seelow Heights =

Place in Brandenburg, Germany

Coordinates: 52°32′5″N 14°23′45″E

The Seelow Heights (German: Seelower Höhen) are situated around the town of Seelow, about 90 kilometres (56 mi) east of Berlin, and overlook the Oderbruch, the western flood plain of the River Oder, which is a further 20 kilometres (12 mi) to the east.

They are sometimes known as the "Gates to Berlin", because the main eastern route out of Berlin runs through them. After World War II, the Seelow Heights Memorial was built, including a bronze statue of a Red Army soldier.

== Second World War ==
During April 1945, the Battle of the Seelow Heights saw some of the heaviest fighting of the Second World War between the German defenders and the Soviet attackers. The fighting took place on the horseshoe-shaped plateau of the Seelow Heights. It ranged in height from 30 to 60 metres (100 to 200 ft) and it overlooked a spongy valley known for the stream veining through it, the Oderbruch. Many localised Soviet attacks were held back by remnants of the Wehrmacht. The Soviet advances could not be held off for long. After several days of intense fighting, the Soviets managed to break through the defences and fight their way into the German capital in the Battle of Berlin.
