= 9th Parachute Division =

German WWII airborne division

- German: 9. Fallschirmjäger-Division
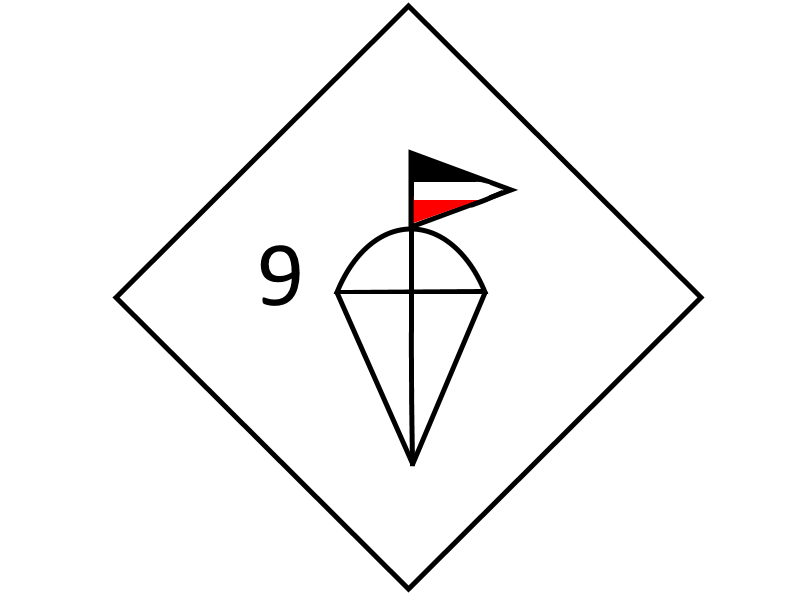
- Unit insignia
- Active: December 1944 – 2 May 1945
- Country: Germany
- Branch: Luftwaffe
- Type: Fallschirmjäger
- Role: Airborne force
- Size: Division
- Engagements: World War II; Eastern Front; Siege of Breslau; Battle of the Seelow Heights; Battle of Berlin

Commanders
- Notable commanders: Bruno Bräuer

The 9th Parachute Division (German: 9. Fallschirmjäger-Division) was one of the final parachute divisions to be raised by Nazi Germany during World War II. The division was destroyed during the Battle of Berlin in April 1945.

== History ==
The 9th Division was formed in December 1944 under the command of General Bruno Bräuer with many Luftwaffe personnel transferred to combat duties for which they had no experience; it was thus a parachute division in name only, paratrooper training having ceased in mid-1944. By that time the new “paratrooper” units were ordinary infantry units under Air Force command. In January 1945 two of his battalions were encircled by the 1st Ukrainian Front in Breslau where they were destroyed.

In the Battle of the Seelow Heights the 9th Division was positioned between Seelow and Neuhardenberg, they received the full force of the first days artillery bombardment by Marshal Georgi Zhukov's 1st Belorussian Front on 16 April. Under this bombardment the 9th Division buckled. It rallied briefly on the morning of 17 April, when it was given some armoured support, but collapsed again shortly afterwards. Bräuer suffered a nervous breakdown and was relieved of his command at the request of Goering, angry at the collapse of one of his Luftwaffe divisions. Bräuer was followed in command by Colonel Herrmann. The SS Nordland Division rounded up some elements of the 9th Division and managed a temporarily successful counterattack.

By 19 April, the remnants of the 9th Division along with what remained of the rest of the LVI Panzer Corps were within the Berlin U-Bahn outer defensive ring. During the attempted breakout on the night of 1/2 May a small group of the 9th Division stormed the tower of Spandau Rathaus (Town Hall) from which Soviet machine-gunners were decimating Germans attempting to break out of Berlin over the Havel using the Charlottenbrücke ('Charlotten Bridge'). By the end of 2 May the 9th Parachute Division had ceased to exist.

== Subordination ==
- Stellv. II Corps, 11th SS Panzer Army, Army Group Vistula – February 1945
- Stellv. II Corps, 3rd Panzer Army, Army Group Vistula – March 1945
- XI SS Corps, 11th Army, Army Group Vistula – April 1945
- LVI Panzer Corps – May 1945

== Commanding officers ==
- Generalleutnant Gustav Wilke (December 1944 – 2 March 1945)
- General der Fallschirmtruppe Bruno Bräuer (2 March 1945 – 18 April 1945)
- Oberst Harry Herrmann (19 April 1945 – 2 May 1945)
