= Battle in Berlin =

Military operations in the city of Berlin near the end of World War II

- Part of the Battle of Berlin
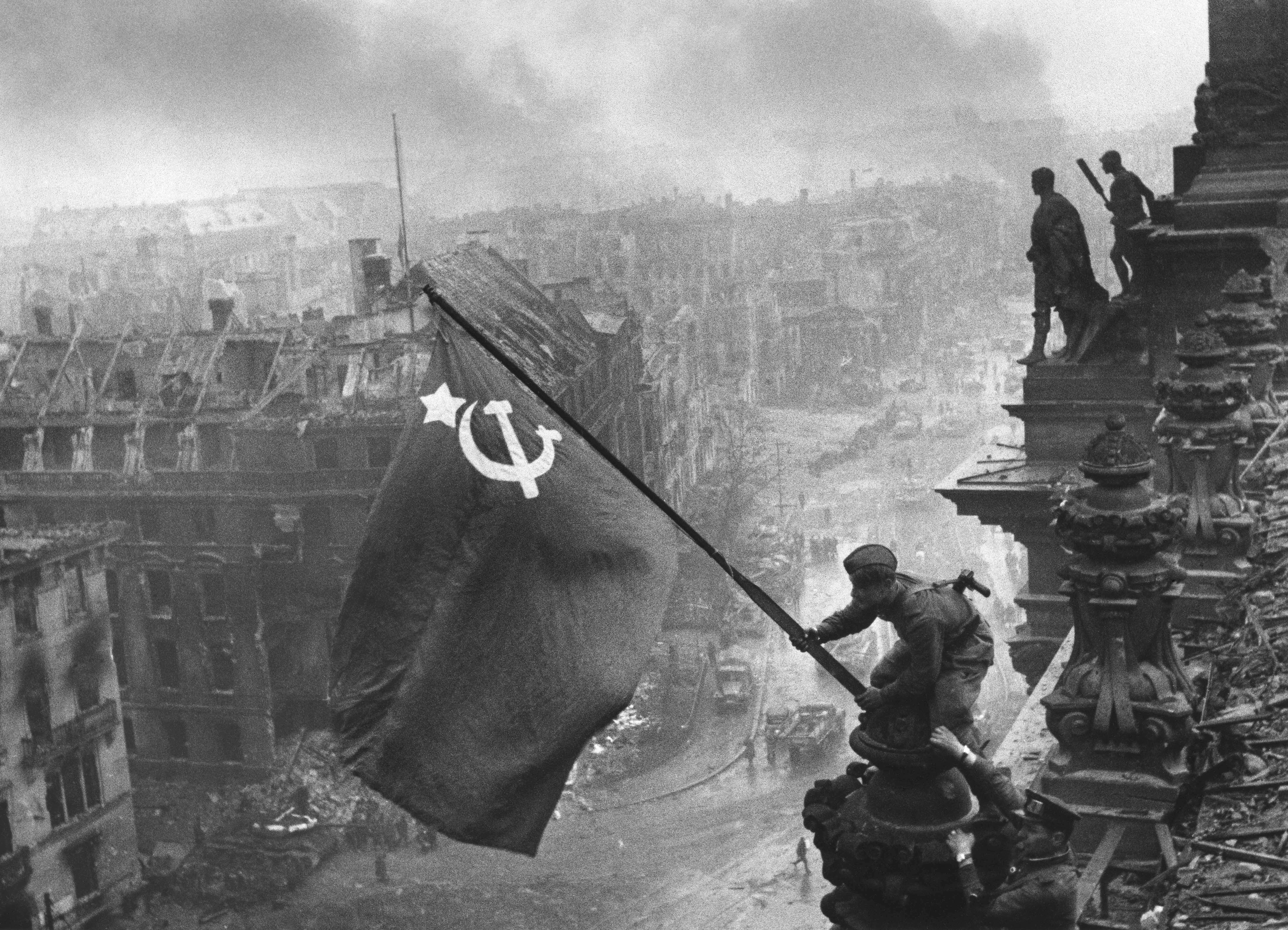
- Raising a Flag over the Reichstag, May 1945
Date	23 April – 2 May 1945 (1 week and 2 days)
Location	Berlin, Germany 52°31′7″N 13°22′34″E
Result	Soviet victory

Belligerents
Germany	Soviet Union; Poland

Commanders and leaders
(Nazi Germany) Helmuth Reymann (Nazi Germany) Helmuth Weidling (surrendered) (Note: Weidling replaced Oberstleutnant Ernst Kaether as commander of Berlin who only held the post for one day having taken command from Reymann.)	(Soviet Union) Georgy Zhukov (Soviet Union) Ivan Konev

Strength
Inside the Berlin Defence Area: approximately 45,000 Army soldiers and SS, supplemented by the Order Police, Hitler Youth, Kriegsmarine sailors and 40,000 Volkssturm (Note: A large number of the 45,000 were troops of the LVI Panzer Corps that were at the start of the battle part of the German 9th Army on the Seelow Heights (Beevor 2002, p. 287))	For the investment and assault on the Berlin Defence Area about 1,500,000 soldiers In Berlin: 464,000 soldiers

Casualties and losses
Unknown (100,000 soldiers killed in the entire Battle of Berlin); 125,000 civilians dead	Unknown, total Soviet casualties during the Battle of Berlin were 81,116 dead or missing and 280,251 sick or wounded

The battle in Berlin was an end phase of the Battle of Berlin. While the Battle of Berlin encompassed the attack by three Soviet fronts (army groups) to capture not only Berlin but the territory of Germany east of the River Elbe still under German control, the battle in Berlin details the fighting and German capitulation that took place within the city.

The outcome of the battle to capture the capital of Nazi Germany was decided during the initial phases of the Battle of Berlin that took place outside the city. As the Soviets invested Berlin and the German forces placed to stop them were destroyed or forced back, the city's fate was sealed. Nevertheless, there was heavy fighting within the city as the Red Army fought its way, street by street, into the centre.

On 23 April 1945, the first Soviet ground forces started to penetrate the outer suburbs of Berlin. By 27 April, Berlin was completely cut off from the outside world. The battle in the city continued until 2 May 1945. On that date, the commander of the Berlin Defence Area, General Helmuth Weidling, surrendered to Lieutenant-General Vasily Chuikov, commander of the Soviet 8th Guards Army, a component of Marshal Georgiy Zhukov's 1st Belorussian Front.

== Prelude ==
=== Battle of the Oder–Neisse ===
The sector in which most of the fighting in the overall battle took place was the Seelow Heights, the last major defensive line outside Berlin. The Battle of the Seelow Heights was one of the last pitched battles of World War II. It was fought over four days, from 16 April until 19 April 1945. Close to one million Soviet soldiers and more than 20,000 tanks and artillery pieces were in action to break through the "Gates to Berlin" which was defended by about 100,000 German soldiers and 1,200 tanks and guns.

On 19 April, the fourth day, the 1st Belorussian Front broke through the final line of the Seelow Heights and nothing but broken German formations lay between them and Berlin. Marshal Ivan Konev's 1st Ukrainian Front, having captured Forst the day before, was fanning out into open country. One powerful thrust was heading north-west towards Berlin while other armies headed west towards a section of the United States Army front line south-west of the city who were on the Elbe.

By the end of 19 April the German eastern front line north of Frankfurt around Seelow and, to the south, around Forst had ceased to exist. These breakthroughs allowed the two Soviet fronts to envelop the German 9th Army in a large pocket east of Frankfurt. Attempts by the 9th Army to break out to the west would result in the Battle of Halbe. The cost to the Soviet forces had been very high between 1 and 19 April, with over 2,807 tanks lost, including at least 727 at the Seelow Heights.

=== Encirclement of Berlin ===
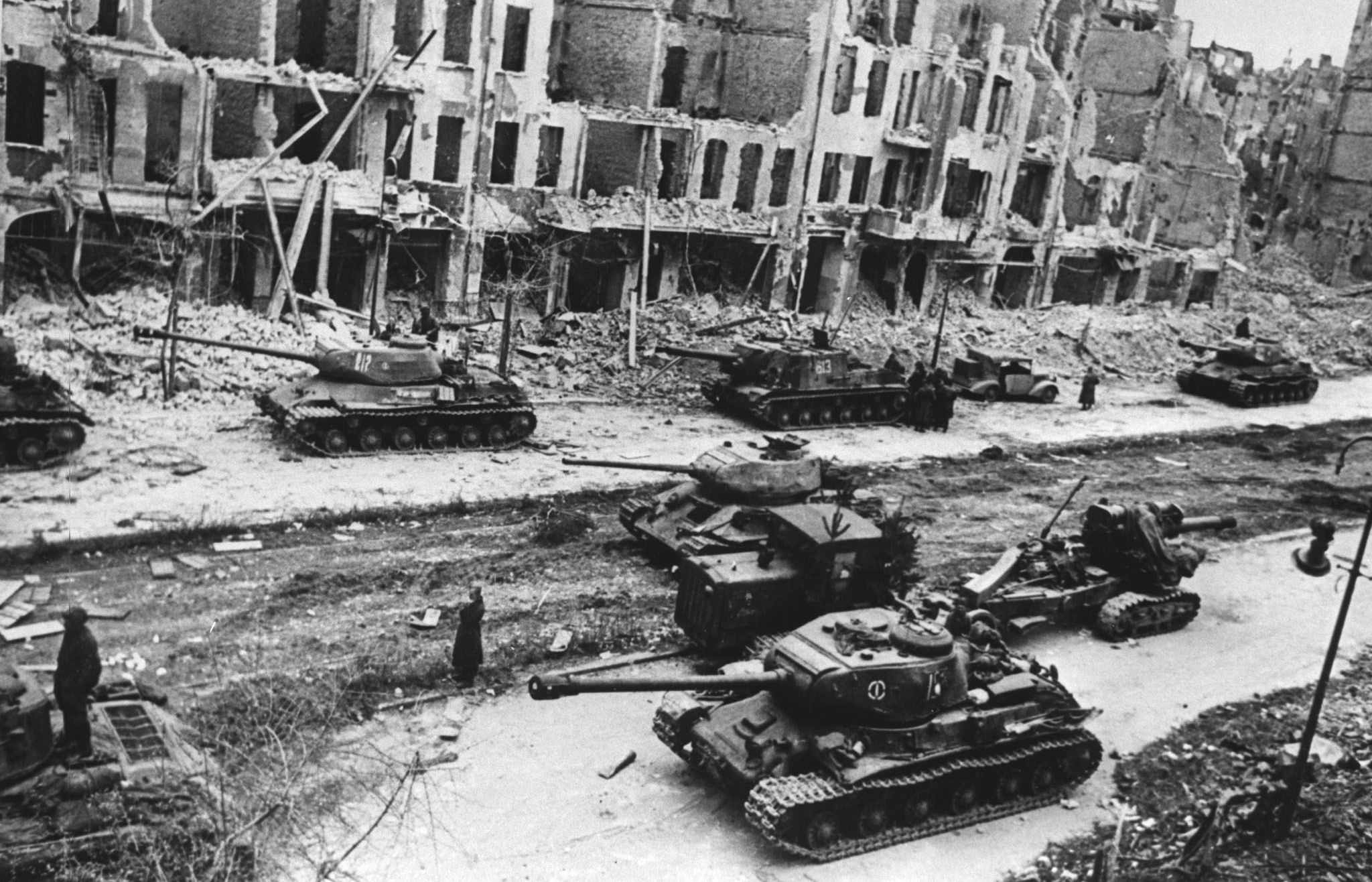
Soviet tanks and self-propelled guns on the streets of Berlin

On 20 April, Adolf Hitler's birthday, Soviet artillery of the 79th Rifle Corps of the 1st Belorussian Front first shelled Berlin. Thereafter, Soviet artillery continued the bombardment of Berlin and did not stop until the city surrendered; the weight of explosives delivered by their artillery during the battle was greater than the tonnage dropped by the Western Allied bombers on the city. The 1st Belorussian Front advanced towards the east and north-east of the city.

The 1st Ukrainian Front had pushed through the last formations of the northern wing of General Ferdinand Schörner's Army Group Centre and had passed north of Jüterbog, well over halfway to the American front line on the Elbe at Magdeburg. To the north between Stettin and Schwedt, Konstantin Rokossovsky's 2nd Belorussian Front attacked the northern flank of General Gotthard Heinrici's Army Group Vistula, held by Hasso von Manteuffel's 3rd Panzer Army.

By 24 April, elements of the 1st Belorussian Front and the 1st Ukrainian Front had completed the encirclement of the city.

The next day, 25 April, the 2nd Belorussian Front broke through the 3rd Panzer Army's line around the bridgehead south of Stettin and crossed the Rando Swamp. They were now free to move west towards the British 21st Army Group and north towards the Baltic port of Stralsund. The Soviet 58th Guards Rifle Division of Zhadov's 5th Guards Army made contact with the 69th Infantry Division of the First United States Army near Torgau on the Elbe. The Soviet investment of Berlin was consolidated with leading units probing and penetrating the S-Bahn defensive ring. By the end of 25 April, there was no prospect that the German defence of the city could do anything but temporarily delay the capture of the capital by the Soviets as the decisive stages of the battle had already been fought and lost by the Germans fighting outside the city.

== Preparation ==
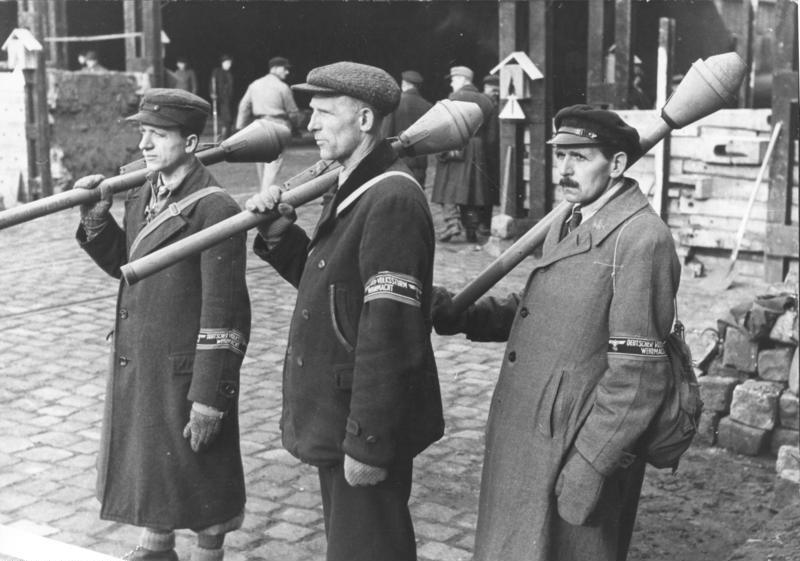
Volkssturm soldiers with Panzerfäuste in Berlin, March 1945

On 20 April, Hitler ordered and the Wehrmacht initiated Operation Clausewitz, which called for the complete evacuation of all Wehrmacht and SS offices in Berlin; this essentially formalized Berlin's status as a frontline city.

The forces available to Artillery General Helmuth Weidling for the city's defence included several severely depleted Wehrmacht and Waffen-SS divisions, in all about 45,000 men. These formations were supplemented by the Berlin Police force, child soldiers in the compulsory Hitler Youth, and the Volkssturm militia of males not already in the military. (Note: By 23 April when the Soviets first entered the city, Weidling's LVI Panzer Corps made up the majority of the Waffen-SS and Wehrmacht forces in Berlin) Many of the 40,000 elderly men of the Volkssturm had been in the army as young men and some were veterans of World War I. Hitler appointed SS-Brigadeführer Wilhelm Mohnke commander of the city's central government district. Mohnke's command post was in bunkers under the Reich Chancellery. The core group of his fighting men were the 800 members of the 1st SS Panzer Division Leibstandarte SS Adolf Hitler Guard Battalion (assigned to guard the Führer). He had a total of over 2,000 men under his command. (Note: The Soviets later estimated the number as 180,000, but this figure was calculated from the number of prisoners that they took and included many unarmed men in uniform, such as railway officials and members of the Reich Labour Service (Beevor 2002, p. 287).)

Weidling organised the defences into eight sectors designated 'A' to 'H', each commanded by a colonel or a general, but most had no combat experience. The 20th Infantry Division was to the west of the city; the 9th Parachute Division to the north; Panzer Division Müncheberg (Werner Mummert) to the north-east; the 11th SS Volunteer Panzergrenadier Division Nordland (Joachim Ziegler) to the south-east; and to the east of Tempelhof Airport. The reserve, the 18th Panzergrenadier Division, was in Berlin's central district.

== Tactics and terrain ==
A Soviet combat group was a mixed arms unit of about eighty men in assault groups of six to eight soldiers, closely supported by field artillery. These were tactical units which were able to apply the tactics of house to house fighting that they had been forced to develop and refine at each Festungsstadt (fortress city) they had encountered since Stalingrad.

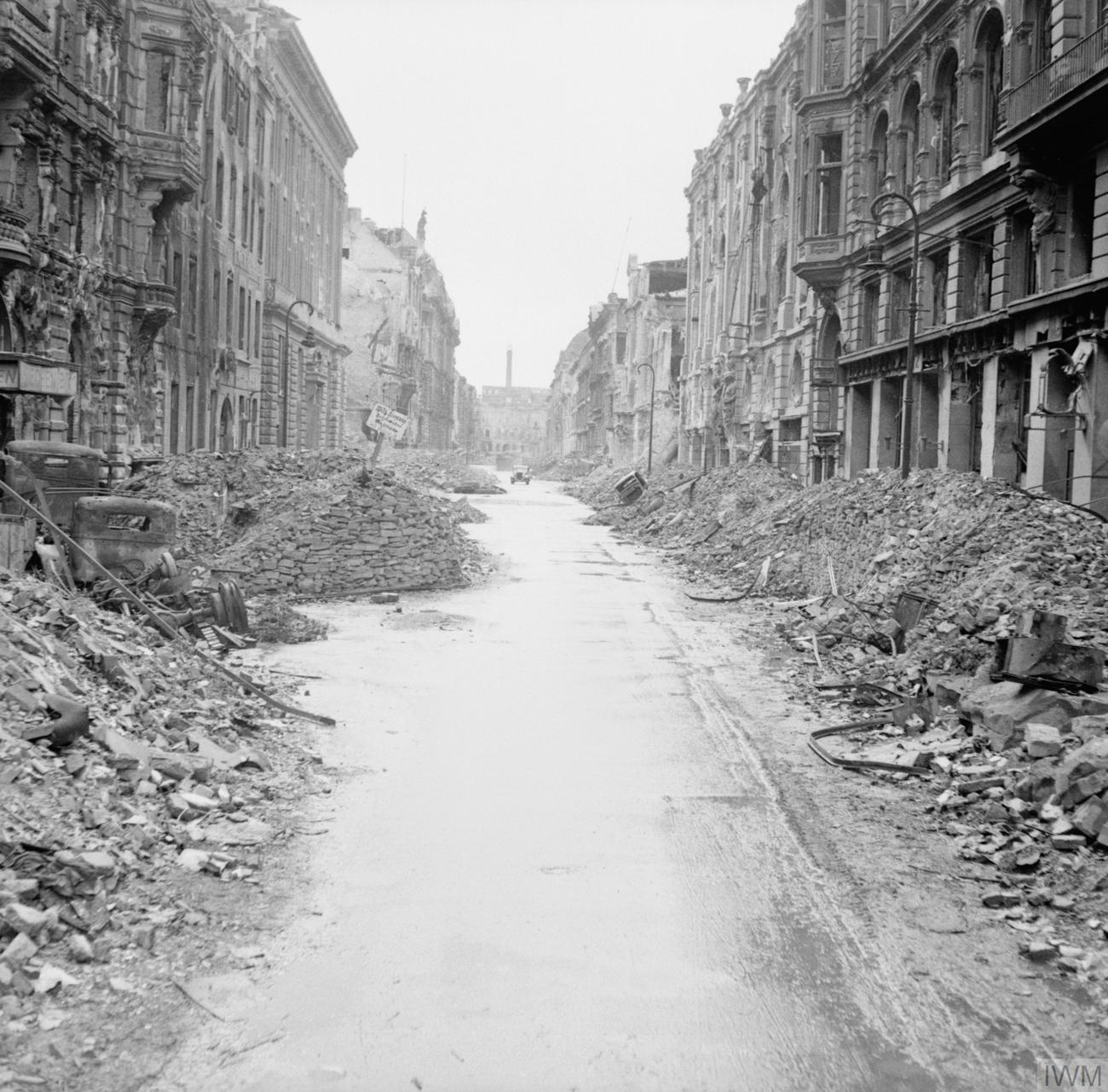
A devastated street in the city centre, 3 July 1945

The German tactics used for urban warfare in Berlin were dictated by three considerations: the experience that they had gained during five years of war, the physical characteristics of the city, and the methods used by the Soviets. Most of the central districts of Berlin consist of city blocks with straight wide roads and contain several waterways, parks and large railway marshalling yards. It is a predominantly flat area, with some low hills such as Kreuzberg, which is 66 metres (217 ft) above sea level. (Note: "A Prussian law of 1875, enacted to cover the streets of Berlin, prescribed that the main avenues should be 95 feet or more in width, secondary thoroughfares from 65 to 95 feet and the local streets from 40 to 65 feet." (McDonnald 1951, p. 720)) (Note: "The Berlin streets are for the most part very broad and straight. They are surprisingly even; there is not a hill worthy of the name in the whole of the city" (Siepen 2011, p. 7).) (Note: "The highest hill in the ridge was the Kreuzberg, which stood at 217 feet (66 m). It became the site of a Schinkel-designed monument erected in 1821 and gave its name to the most famous of Berlin's districts" (Urban Land Institute 2006, p. 88).) Much of the housing stock consisted of apartment blocks built in the second half of the 19th century. Most of those, thanks to housing regulations and few elevators, were five stories high and built around a courtyard that could be reached from the street through a corridor large enough to accommodate a horse and cart or a small delivery truck. In many places, these apartment blocks were built around several courtyards, one behind the other, each reached through the outer courtyards by a ground level corridor similar to that between the first courtyard and the road. The larger, more expensive flats faced the street while the smaller, more modest dwellings were grouped around the inner courtyards. (Note: The poorer tenement blocks were known as "Rent-barracks" (Mietskasernen))

Just as the Soviets had learned a lot about urban warfare, so had the Germans. The Waffen-SS did not use makeshift barricades erected close to street corners, because these could be raked by artillery fire from guns firing over open sights further along the straight streets. Instead, they put snipers and machine guns on the upper floors and roofs because the Soviet tanks could not elevate their guns that high, and simultaneously they put men armed with Panzerfaust anti-tank weapons in cellar windows to ambush tanks as they moved down the streets. These tactics were quickly adopted by the Hitler Youth and the Volkssturm.

Initially Soviet tanks advanced down the middle of the streets, but to counter the German tactics, they altered their own and started to hug the sides of the streets; this allowed for supporting cross-fire from tanks either side of the wider thoroughfares. The Soviets also mounted sub-machine gunners on the tanks who sprayed every doorway and window, but this meant the tank could not traverse its turret quickly. Another solution was to rely on heavy howitzers (152 mm and 203 mm) firing over open sights to blast defended buildings and to use anti-aircraft guns against the German gunners on the higher floors. Soviet combat groups started to move from house to house instead of directly down the streets. They moved through the apartments and cellars, blasting holes through the walls of adjacent buildings (making effective use of abandoned German Panzerfausts), while others fought across the rooftops and through the attics. These enfilading tactics took the Germans lying in ambush for tanks in the flanks. Flamethrowers and grenades proved to be very effective, but as the Berlin civilian population had not been evacuated, these tactics inevitably killed many non-combatants.

== Battle ==
=== Outer suburbs ===
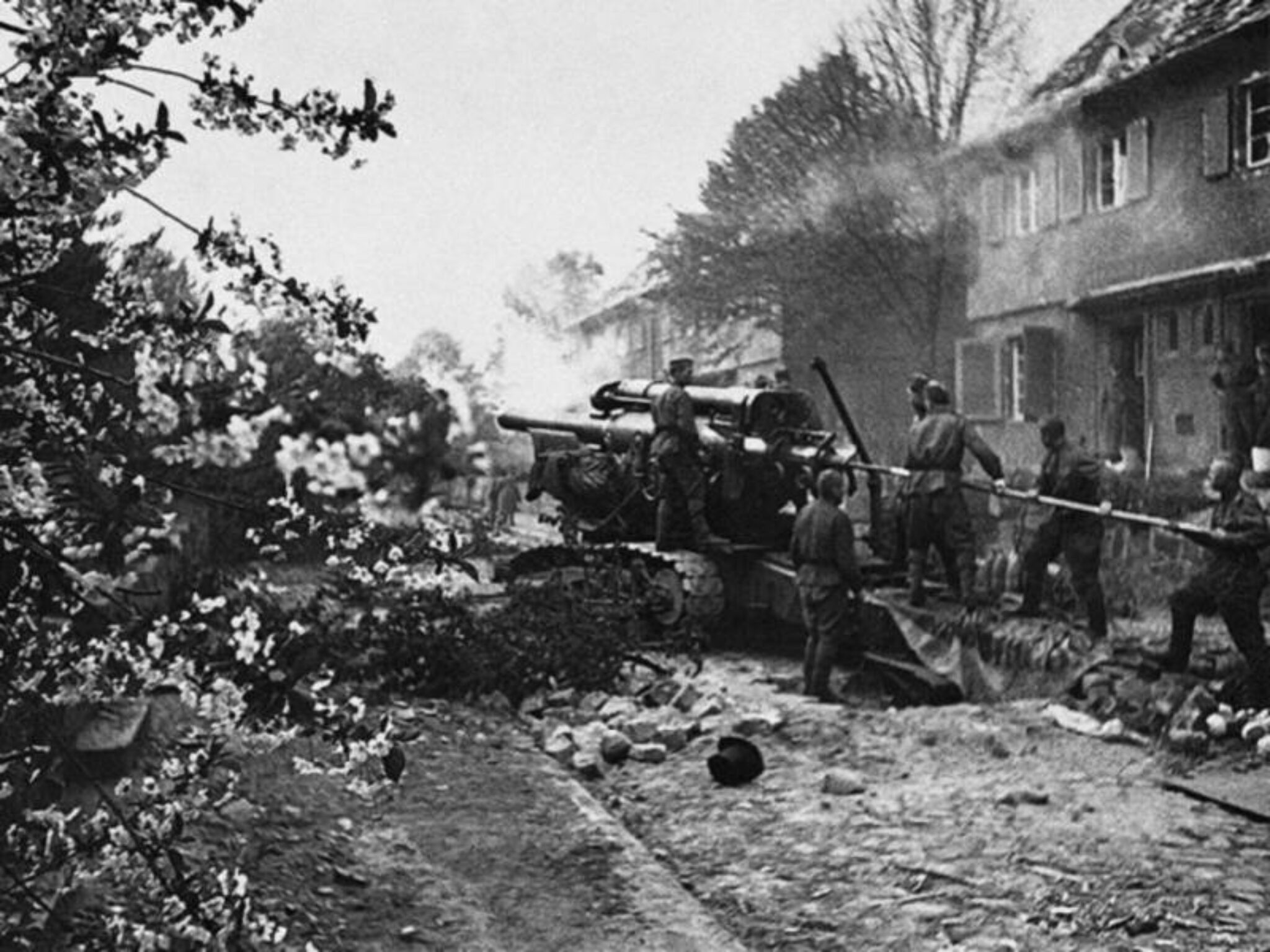
B-4 howitzer firing on the streets of Berlin

With the decisive stages of the battle being fought outside the city, Berlin's fate was sealed, yet the resistance inside continued. On 23 April, Hitler appointed German Artillery General (General der Artillerie) Helmuth Weidling commander of the Berlin Defence Area. Only a day earlier, Hitler had ordered that Weidling be executed by firing squad. This was due to a misunderstanding concerning a retreat order issued by Weidling as commander of the LVI Panzer Corps. On 20 April, Weidling had been appointed commander of the LVI Panzer Corps. Weidling replaced Lieutenant-Colonel (Oberstleutnant) Ernst Kaether as commander of Berlin. Only one day earlier, Kaether had replaced Lieutenant-General (Generalleutnant) Helmuth Reymann, who had held the position for only about a month.

By 23 April, some of Chuikov's rifle units had crossed the Spree and Dahme rivers south of Köpenick and by 24 April were advancing towards Britz and Neukölln. Accompanying them were the leading tanks of Colonel-General Mikhail Katukov's 1st Guards Tank Army. Sometime after midnight, a corps of Colonel-General Nikolai Berzarin's 5th Shock Army crossed the Spree close to Treptow Park. At dawn on 24 April the LVI Panzer Corps still under Weidling's direct command, counterattacked but were severely mauled by the 5th Shock Army, which was able to continue its advance around mid-day. Meanwhile, the first large Soviet probe into the city was put into operation. Katukov's 1st Guards Tank Army attacked across the Teltow Canal. At 06:20 a bombardment by 3,000 guns and heavy mortars began (a staggering 650 pieces of artillery per kilometre of front). At 07:00 hours the first Soviet battalions were across, to be followed by tanks around 12:00, shortly after the first of the pontoon bridges were completed. By the evening Treptow Park was in Soviet hands and they had also reached the S-Bahn.

While the fighting raged in the south-east of the city, between 320 and 330 French volunteers commanded by SS-Brigadeführer Gustav Krukenberg from SS Division Charlemagne were attached to the Nordland Division. They moved from the SS training ground near Neustrelitz to the centre of Berlin through the western suburbs, which apart from unmanned barricades across the Havel and Spree were devoid of fortifications or defenders. Of all the reinforcements ordered to Berlin that day, only these French volunteers arrived.

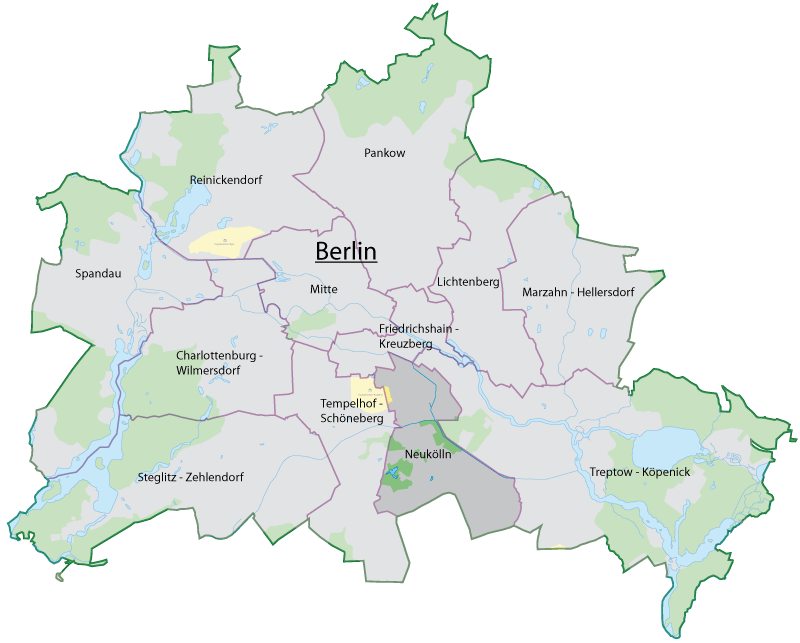
The location of Neukölln

On 25 April, Krukenberg was appointed commander of Defence Sector C which included the Nordland Division, whose previous commander, Joachim Ziegler, was relieved of his command the same day. The arrival of the French SS men bolstered the Nordland Division whose Norge and Danmark regiments had been decimated in the fighting. Just midday as Krukenberg reached his command, the last German bridgehead south of the Teltow Canal was being abandoned. During the night Krukenberg informed General Hans Krebs, Chief of the General Staff of Oberkommando des Heeres (OKH) that within 24 hours the Nordland would have to fall back to the central sector Z (Z for Zentrum or Mitte). (Note: Beevor states the centre sector was known as Z for Zentrum (Beevor 2002, p. 304); while Fischer and Tiemann, quoting General Mohnke directly refers to the smaller centre government quarter/district in this area and under his command as Z-Zitadelle ("Citadel") (Fischer 2008, pp. 42–43, and Tiemann 1998, p. 336).)

Soviet combat groups of the 8th Guards Army and the 1st Guards Tank Army fought their way through the southern suburbs of Neukölln towards Tempelhof Airport which was located just inside the S-Bahn defensive ring. Defending Sector D was Panzer Division Müncheberg. This division, down to its last dozen tanks and thirty armoured vehicles, had been promised replacements for battle losses but only stragglers and Volkssturm were available to fill the ranks. The Soviets advanced cautiously, using flamethrowers to overcome defensive positions. By dusk Soviet T-34 tanks had reached the airfield, only six kilometres (four miles) south of the Führerbunker, where they were checked by stiff German resistance. The Müncheberg Division managed to hold the line until the afternoon of the next day, but this was the last time they were able to check the Soviet advance for more than a few hours.

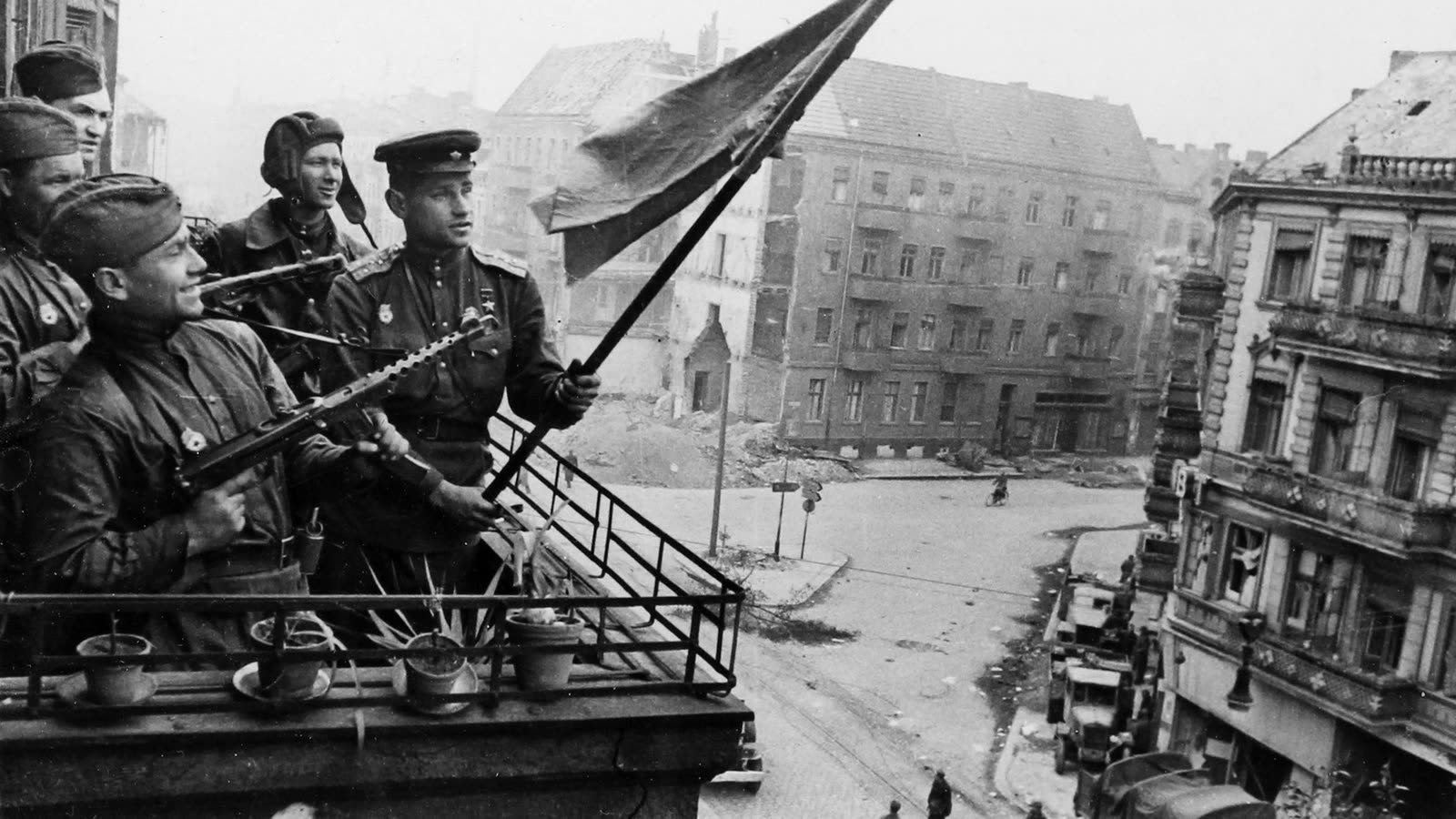
Hero of the Soviet Union Captain Fyodor Akimovich Lipatkin, a company commander of the 1st Guards Tank Army's 11th Separate Guards Heavy Tank Regiment, raises the Red flag on the balcony of a house in Berlin, 26 April 1945

On 26 April, with Neukölln heavily penetrated by Soviet combat groups, Krukenberg prepared fallback positions for Sector C defenders around Hermannplatz. He moved his headquarters into the opera house. The two understrength German divisions defending the south-east were now facing five Soviet armies. From east to west they were: the 5th Shock Army, advancing from Treptow Park; the 8th Guards Army and the 1st Guards Tank Army moving through Neukölln north (temporarily checked at Tempelhof Airport), and Colonel-General Pavel Rybalko's 3rd Guards Tank Army (part of Konev's 1st Ukrainian Front) advancing from Mariendorf. As the Nordland Division fell back towards Hermannplatz, the French SS and one-hundred Hitler Youth attached to their group destroyed 14 Soviet tanks with panzerfausts; one machine gun position by the Halensee bridge managed to hold up any Soviet advances in that area for 48 hours. The Nordland Division's remaining armour, eight Tiger tanks and several assault guns, were ordered to take up positions in the Tiergarten, because although these two divisions of Weidling's LVI Panzer Corps could slow the Soviet advance, they could not stop it. SS-Oberscharführer Schmidt recalled, "I was assigned as platoon leader of a 'dwindled company' which included a squad of Hungarian volunteers, Volkssturm men, Hitlerjugend, as well as members of the Heer [army]... Daily, the Russians advanced closer to the government quarter, which we were to defend. It became more and more difficult to hold the line 'under all circumstances'..."

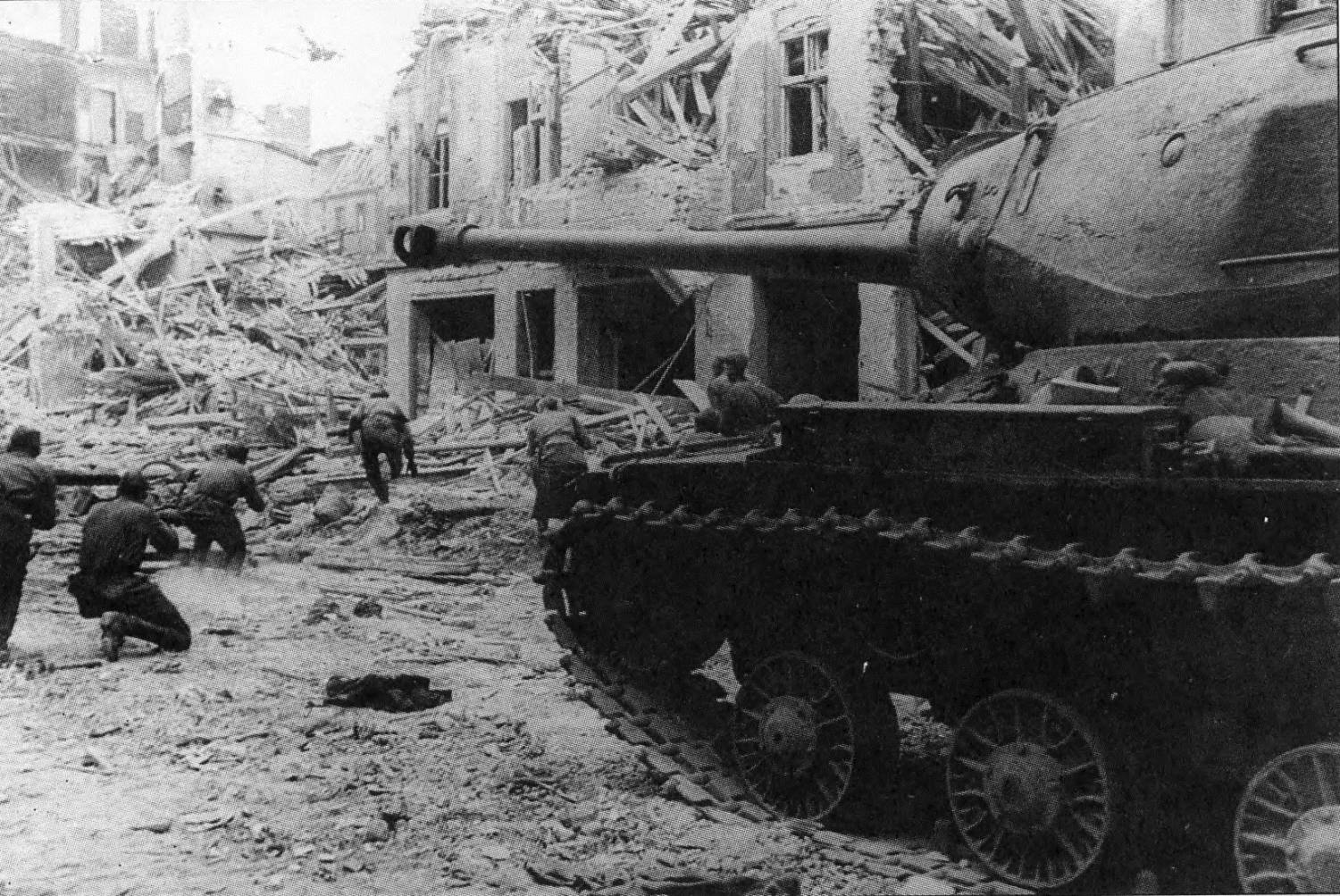
Lipatkin's IS-2 tank supporting infantry in battle on a Berlin street, 27 April

Hitler summoned Field Marshal Robert Ritter von Greim from Munich to Berlin to take over command of the German Air Force (Luftwaffe) from Hermann Göring. While flying over Berlin in a Fieseler Storch, von Greim was seriously wounded by Soviet anti-aircraft fire. Hanna Reitsch, his mistress and a crack test pilot, landed von Greim on an improvised air strip in the Tiergarten near the Brandenburg Gate.

At Tempelhof Airport, the flak batteries conducted direct fire against advancing Soviet tanks until they were overrun. On the following day, 27 April, 2,000 German women were rounded up and ordered to help clear Tempelhof Airport of debris so that the Red Army Air Force could start to use it. Marshal Zhukov appointed Colonel-General Berzarin to start organising the German civil administration in the areas that they had captured. Bürgermeister, just as the directors of the Berlin utilities, were summoned to appear before Berzarin's staff.

=== Inner suburbs ===
As the Soviet armies of the 1st Belorussian Front and the 1st Ukrainian Front converged on the centre of the city there were many accidental 'friendly fire' incidents involving artillery shelling because the spotter planes and the artillery of the different Soviet Fronts were not coordinated and frequently mistook assault groups in other armies as enemy troops. Indeed, the rivalry between the Soviet armies to capture the city centre was becoming intense. A corps commander of the 1st Ukrainian Front joked with laconic humour, "Now we should be scared not of the enemy, but of our neighbour... There's nothing more depressing in Berlin than learning about the successes of your neighbour". Beevor has claimed that the rivalry went further than just jokes and says that Chuikov deliberately ordered the left flank of the 8th Guards Army (of 1st Belorussian Front) across the front of the 3rd Guards Tank Army (of the 1st Ukrainian Front), blocking its direct path to the Reichstag. As Chuikov did not inform Rybalko, commander of the 3rd Guards Tank Army, that the 8th was doing this, the troops ordered to carry out this manoeuvre suffered disproportionate casualties from friendly fire.

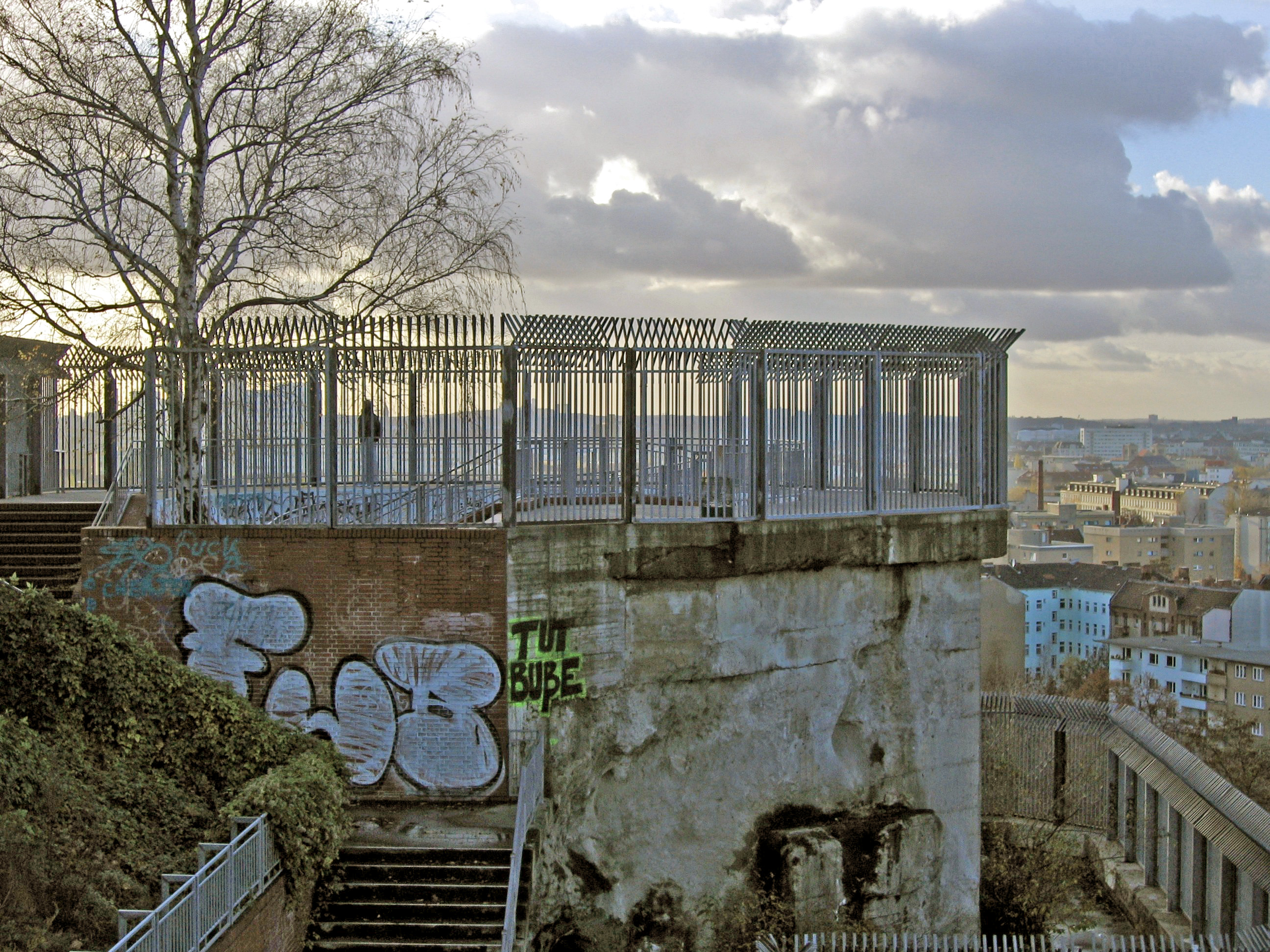
Humboldthain Flak Tower in 2004

In the south-west, Rybalko's 3rd Guards Tank Army, supported by Lieutenant-General Luchinsky's 28th Army, were advancing through the wooded park and suburbs of the Grunewald, attacking what remained of 18th Panzergrenadier Division on their eastern flank and entering Charlottenburg. In the south, Chuikov's 8th Guards Army and Katukov's 1st Guards Tank Army crossed the Landwehr Canal on 27 April, the last major obstacle between them and the Führerbunker next to the Reich Chancellery less than 2 kilometres (1 mi) away. In the south-east, Berzarin's 5th Shock Army had bypassed the Friedrichshain flak tower and was now between Frankfurter Allee and the south bank of the Spree, where its IX Corps was fighting.

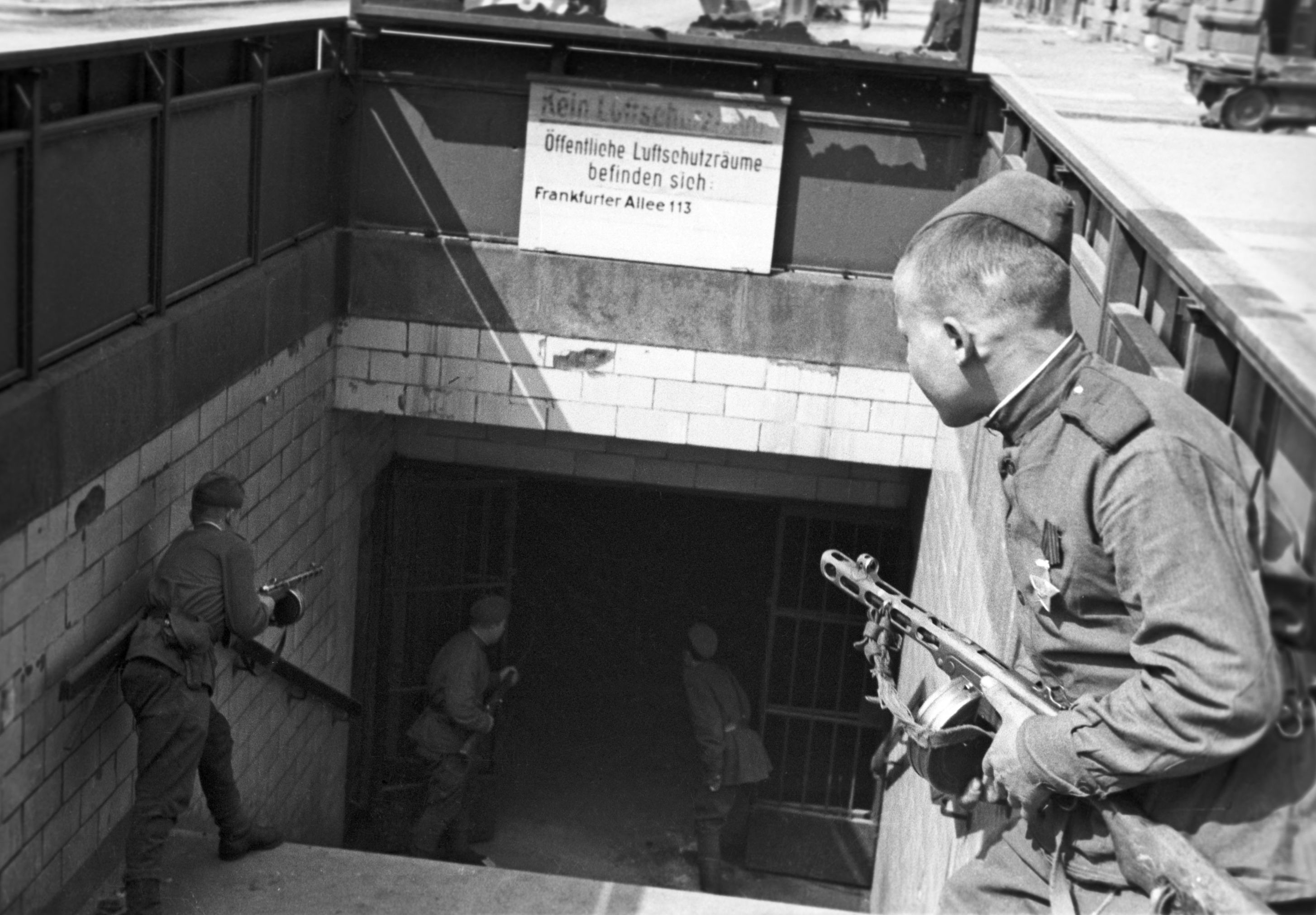
Soviet soldiers from the 8th Guards Army's 94th Guards Rifle Division entering the Frankfurter Allee U-Bahn station in the Berlin suburbs

By 27 April the Soviet Armies had penetrated the German's S-Bahn outer defensive ring from all directions. The Germans had been forced back into a pocket about twenty-five kilometres (16 mi) long from west to east and about three kilometres (2 mi) wide at its narrowest, just west of the old city centre, near the Tiergarten. In the north-west, Lieutenant-General F.I. Perkohorovich's 47th Army was now approaching Spandau, and was also heavily involved in a battle to capture Gatow airfield, which was defended by Volkssturm and Luftwaffe cadets using the feared 88 mm anti-aircraft guns in their anti-tank role. In the north, Colonel-General Semyon Bogdanov's 2nd Guards Tank Army was bogged down just south of Siemensstadt. Colonel-General Vasily Kuznetsov's 3rd Shock Army had bypassed the Humboldthain flak tower (leaving it to follow-up forces), and had reached the north of the Tiergarten and Prenzlauerberg.

On the morning of 27 April, the Soviets continued the assault with a heavy bombardment of the inner city. The 8th Guards Army and the 1st Guards Tank Army were ordered to take Belle-Alliance-Platz (Belle-Alliance being an alternative name for the Battle of Waterloo) that in a twist of history was defended by French SS soldiers attached to the Nordland Division. That night Weidling gave a battle situation report to Hitler and presented him with a detailed breakout plan which would be spearheaded with just under forty tanks (all the combat-ready German tanks available in Berlin). Hitler rejected the plan, saying he would stay in the bunker and that Weidling would carry on with the defence.

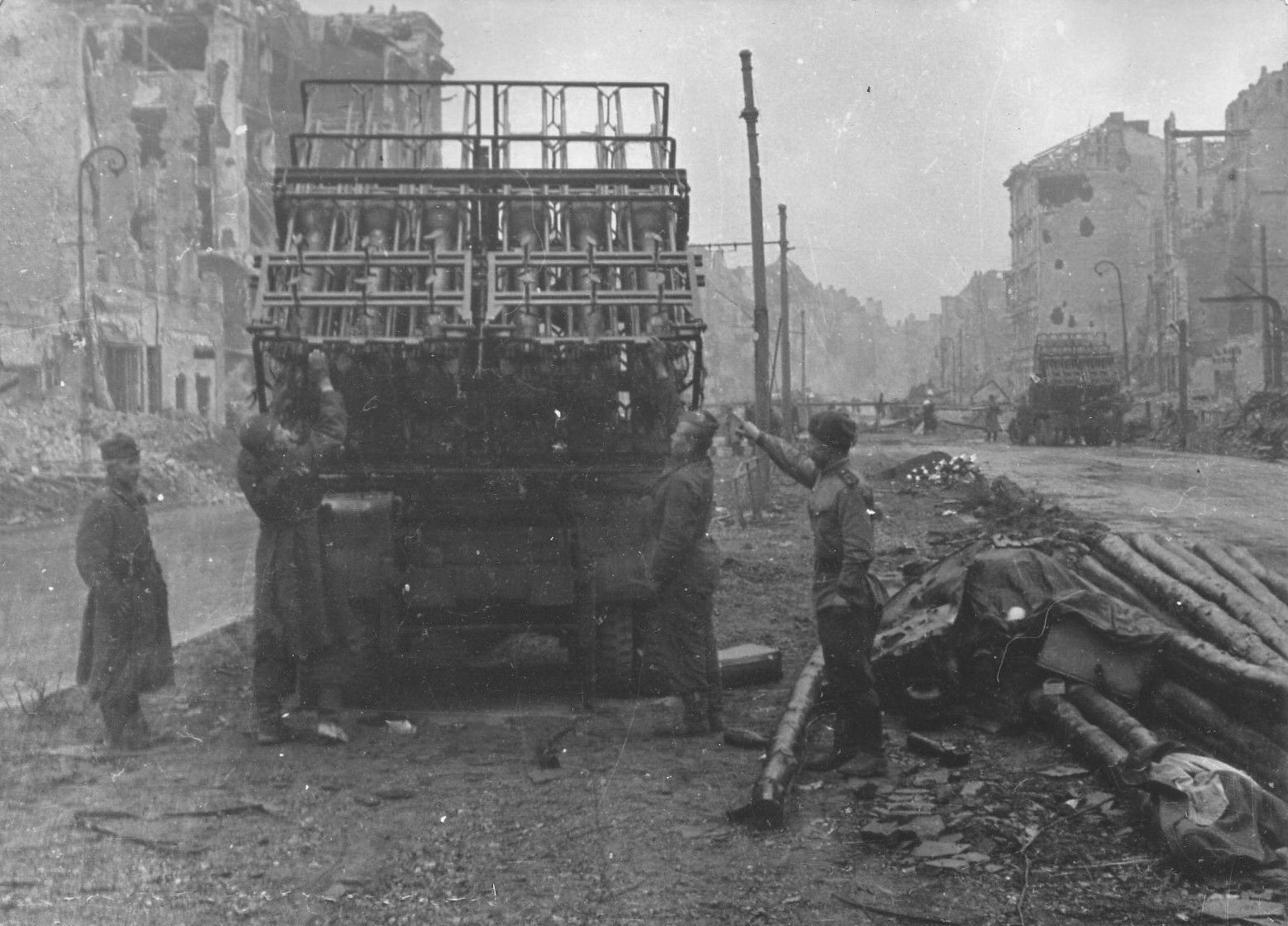
A Soviet Katyusha rocket launcher crew preparing to fire on a street in Berlin

In sector Z (centre) Krukenberg Nordland divisional headquarters was now a carriage in the Stadtmitte U-Bahn station. The Nordland's armour was reduced to four captured Soviet armoured personnel carriers and two half-tracks, so Kruneberg's men's chief weapon was now the Panzerfaust which were used for close quarters battle against both Soviet armour and in house to house fighting against Soviet combat groups.

At dawn on 28 April, the youth divisions Clausewitz, Scharnhorst and Theodor Körner, attacked from the south-west in the direction of Berlin. They were part of Wenck's XX Corps and were made up of men from the officer training schools, making them some of the best units the Germans had left. They covered a distance of about 24 km (15 mi), before being halted at the tip of Lake Schwielow south-west of Potsdam and still 32 km (20 mi) from Berlin. In the evening of 28 April, the BBC broadcast a Reuters news report about Heinrich Himmler's attempted negotiations with the western Allies through Count Folke Bernadotte in Lübeck. Upon being informed, Hitler flew into a rage and told those who were still with him in the bunker complex that Himmler's act was the worst treachery he had ever known. Hitler ordered von Greim and Reitsch to fly to Karl Dönitz's headquarters at Ploen and arrest the "traitor" Himmler.

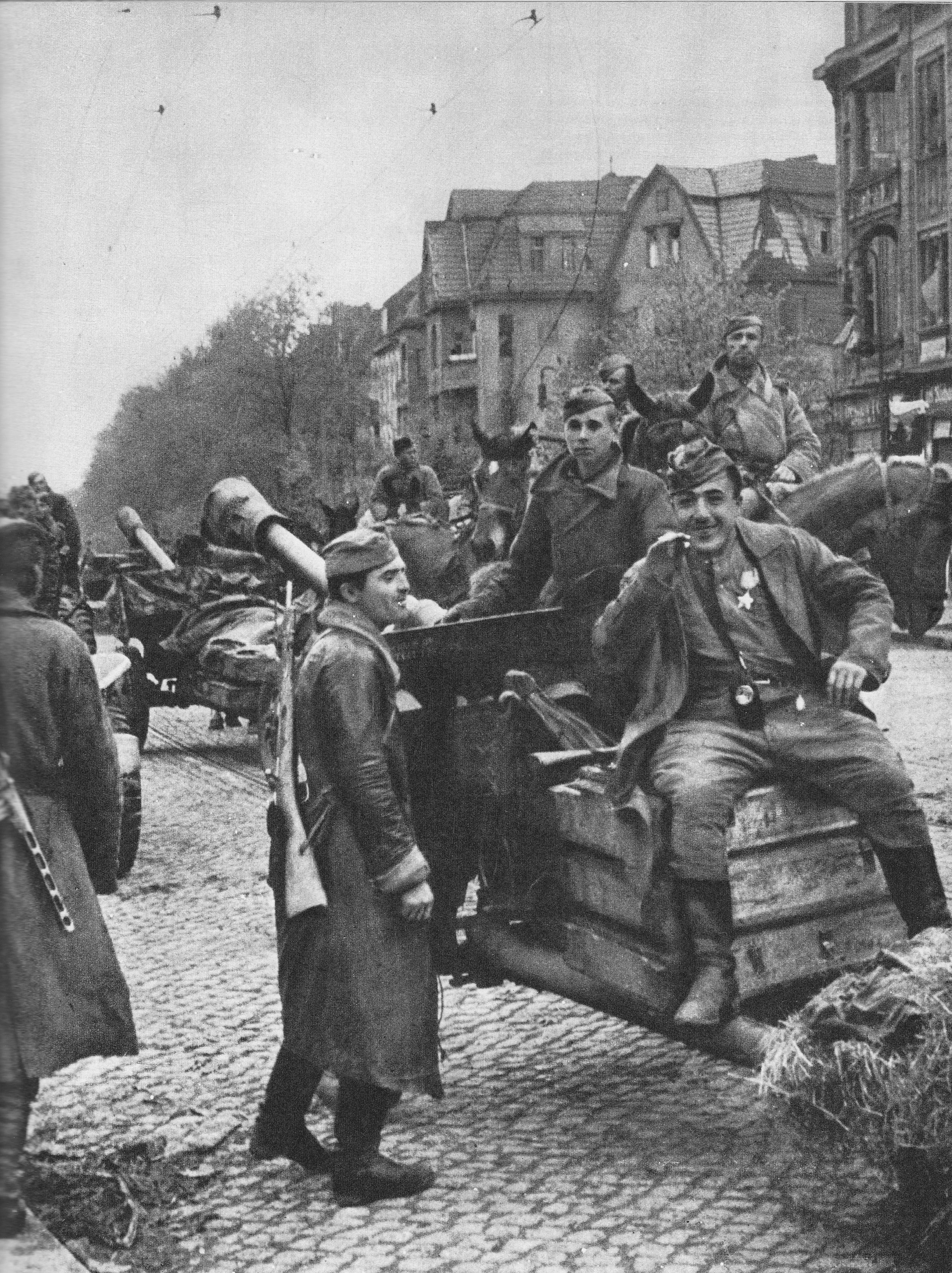
Soviet soldiers resting on a ZiS-3 76 mm gun on a street in Berlin, 26 April

By 28 April, the Müncheberg Division had been driven back to the Anhalter railway station less than 1 km (1,100 yd) south of the Führerbunker. To slow the advancing Soviets, allegedly on Hitler's orders, the bulkheads under the Landwehr Canal were blown up. It caused panic in the U-Bahn tunnels under the Anhalter railway station in which some were trampled to death. But the water level only suddenly rose by about one metre (3 ft) and after that much more slowly. Initially it was thought that many thousands had drowned, but when the tunnels were pumped out in October 1945 it was found that most of the bodies were of people who had died of their wounds, not from drowning. (Note: Antony Beevor writes that the incident is contentious and that the number of dead and the day of the incident vary. He states that orders were given by Krukenberg to a group of Nordland sappers on 1 May (after Hitler's death) and that the charge probably did not go off until the early hours of 2 May (Beevor 2002, p. 371). Stephan Hamilton finds it more likely that the tunnel system "flooded due to several broken locks caused by the thousands of tons of heavy Soviet artillery and rocket fire". He points out that it would not make any sense for the SS to flood the tunnels when "The U-Bahn tunnel system in Berlin's centre served key functions for the defenders like command-and-control centers, makeshift hospitals and supply points. In addition, the Germans effectively used the system to move quickly around the city to attack the Russians. Even the SS maintained several combat HQs along the U-Bahn line that ran north-south from the Stadtmitte U-Bahn station" (Hamilton 2008, p. 214).) In any event, the Soviets continued their advance with three T-34s, making it as far as Wilhelmstrasse U-Bahn station before being ambushed and destroyed by the Frenchmen of the Nordland Division.

During 27 and 28 April, most of the formations of Konev's 1st Ukrainian Front that were engaged in the Battle in Berlin were ordered to disengage and proceed south to take part in the Prague Offensive (the last great offensive of the European theatre). This did not mitigate their resentment at being denied the honour of capturing the centre of Berlin, but left the 1st Belorussian Front under Marshal Zhukov to claim that honour for themselves alone.

By 28 April, the Germans were now reduced to a strip less than 5 km (3 mi) wide and 15 km (9 mi) in length, from Alexanderplatz in the east to Charlottenburg and the area around the Olympic Stadium (Reichssportfeld) in the west. Generally, the Soviets avoided fighting their way into tunnels and bunkers (of which there were about 1,000 in the Berlin area); instead, they sealed them off and continued the advance. However, just over 1 km (0.6 mi) to the north of the Reichstag the 3rd Shock Army did use heavy guns at point blank range to blast a hole in the walls of Moabit prison; after a breach was made and the prison stormed, the garrison there quickly surrendered. The 3rd Shock Army were in sight of the Victory Column in the Tiergarten and during the afternoon advanced towards the Moltke Bridge over the Spree, just north of the Ministry of the Interior and a mere 600 m (660 yd) from the Reichstag. German demolition charges damaged the Moltke bridge but left it still passable to infantry. As dusk fell and under heavy artillery bombardment, the first Soviet troops crossed the bridge. By midnight, the Soviet 150th and 171st Rifle Divisions had secured the bridgehead against any counterattack the Germans could muster.

=== Centre ===
On 28 April, Krebs made his last telephone call from the Führerbunker. He called Field Marshal Wilhelm Keitel, the Chief of Oberkommando der Wehrmacht (OKW, "high command of the armed forces"), in Fürstenberg. Krebs told Keitel that, if relief did not arrive within 48 hours, all would be lost. Keitel promised to exert the utmost pressure on Generals Walther Wenck, commander of 12th Army, and Theodor Busse, commander of the 9th Army. Meanwhile, Hitler's private secretary (and head of the Nazi Party Chancellery) Martin Bormann wired to the head of the navy Admiral Dönitz: [the] "Reich Chancellery (Reichskanzlei) [is] a heap of rubble." He went on to say that the foreign press was reporting fresh acts of treason and "that without exception Schörner, Wenck and the others must give evidence of their loyalty by the quickest relief of the Führer".

During the evening, von Greim and Reitsch flew out from Berlin in an Arado Ar 96 trainer. Von Greim was ordered to get the Luftwaffe to attack the Soviet forces that had just reached Potsdamerplatz and to make sure that Himmler was punished. (Note: According to Beevor the Luftwaffe was to attack Potsdamerplatz (Beevor 2002, p. 342). According to Ziemke it was to support Wenck's 12th Army attack (Ziemke 1969, p. 118).) Fearing that Hitler was escaping in the plane, troops of the Soviet 3rd Shock Army, which was fighting its way through the Tiergarten from the north, tried to shoot down the Arado but the plane took off successfully.

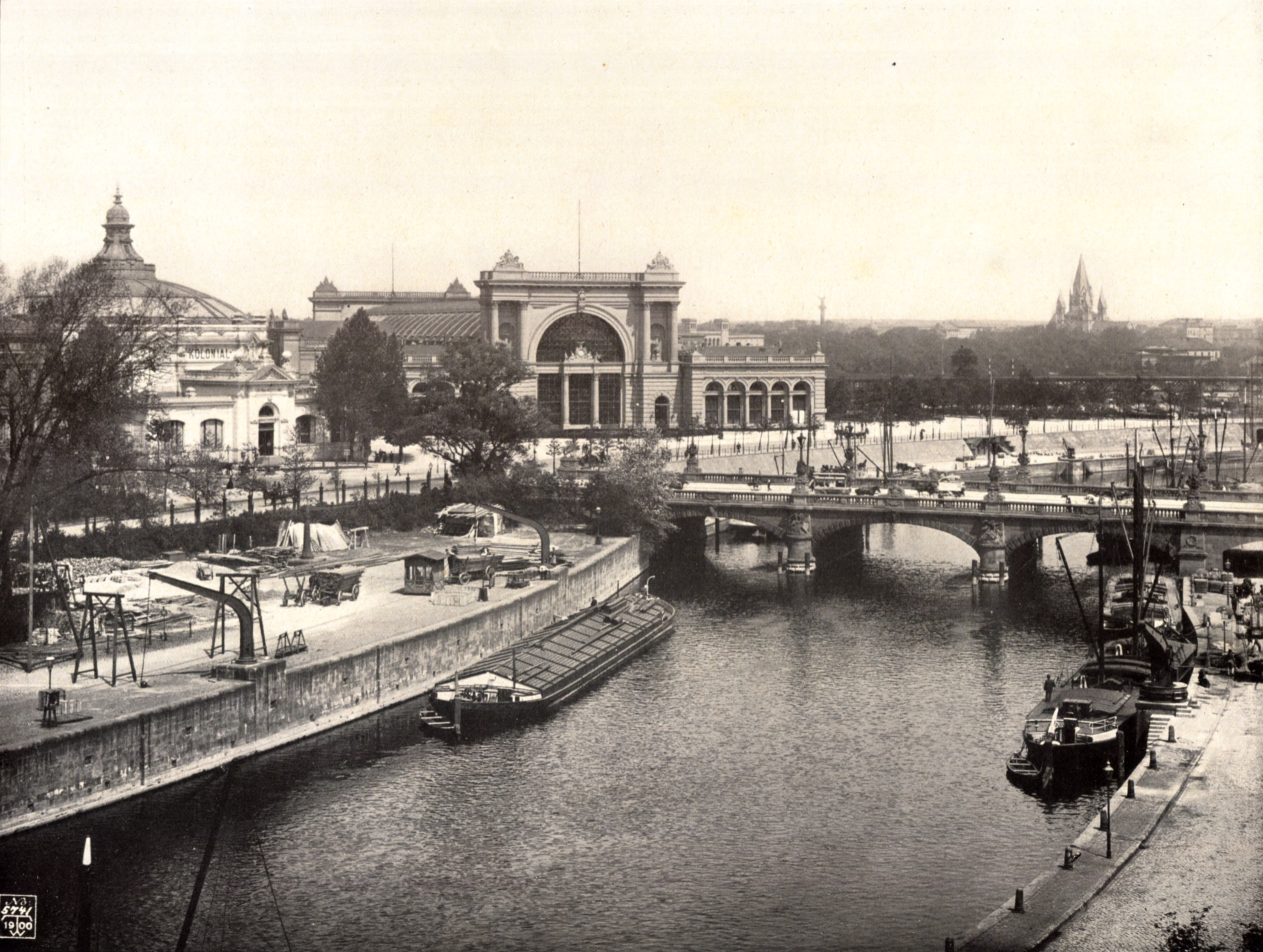
The Moltke bridge c. 1900

During the night of 28 April, Wenck reported to Keitel that his 12th Army had been forced back along the entire front. This was particularly true of XX Corps that had been able to establish temporary contact with the Potsdam garrison. According to Wenck, no relief for Berlin by his army was now possible. This was even more so as support from the 9th Army could no longer be expected. Keitel gave Wenck permission to break off his attempt to relieve Berlin.

At 04:00 hours on 29 April, in the Führerbunker, General Wilhelm Burgdorf, Goebbels, Krebs, and Bormann witnessed and signed the last will and testament of Adolf Hitler. Hitler dictated the document to Traudl Junge, shortly after he had married Eva Braun. (Note: On the MI5 website, using sources available to Hugh Trevor-Roper (a Second World War MI5 agent and historian/author of The Last Days of Hitler), records the marriage as taking place after Hitler had dictated his last will and testament (MI5 staff 2012, "Hitler's will and marriage").)

After Rokossovsky's 2nd Belorussian Front had broken out of their bridgehead, General Heinrici disobeyed Hitler's direct orders and allowed von Manteuffel's request for a general withdrawal of the 3rd Panzer Army. By 29 April, Army Group Vistula Headquarters staff could no longer contact the 9th Army, so there was little in the way of coordination that Heinrici's staff could still to do. As Heinrici had disobeyed a direct order from Hitler (in allowing von Manteuffel to retreat), he was relieved of his command. However, von Manteuffel refused Keitel's request that he take over, and although ordered to report to OKW headquarters, Heinrici dallied and never arrived. Keitel later recalled the incident in his memoirs and said that command passed to the senior army commander of the 21st Army, General Kurt von Tippelskirch. Other sources claim that von Tippelskirch's appointment was temporary and only until the arrival of General Kurt Student. Student was captured by British forces and never arrived. Whether von Tippelskirch or Student or both took command, the rapidly deteriorating situation that the Germans faced, meant that Army Group Vistula's coordination of the armies under its nominal command during the last few days of the war were of little significance.

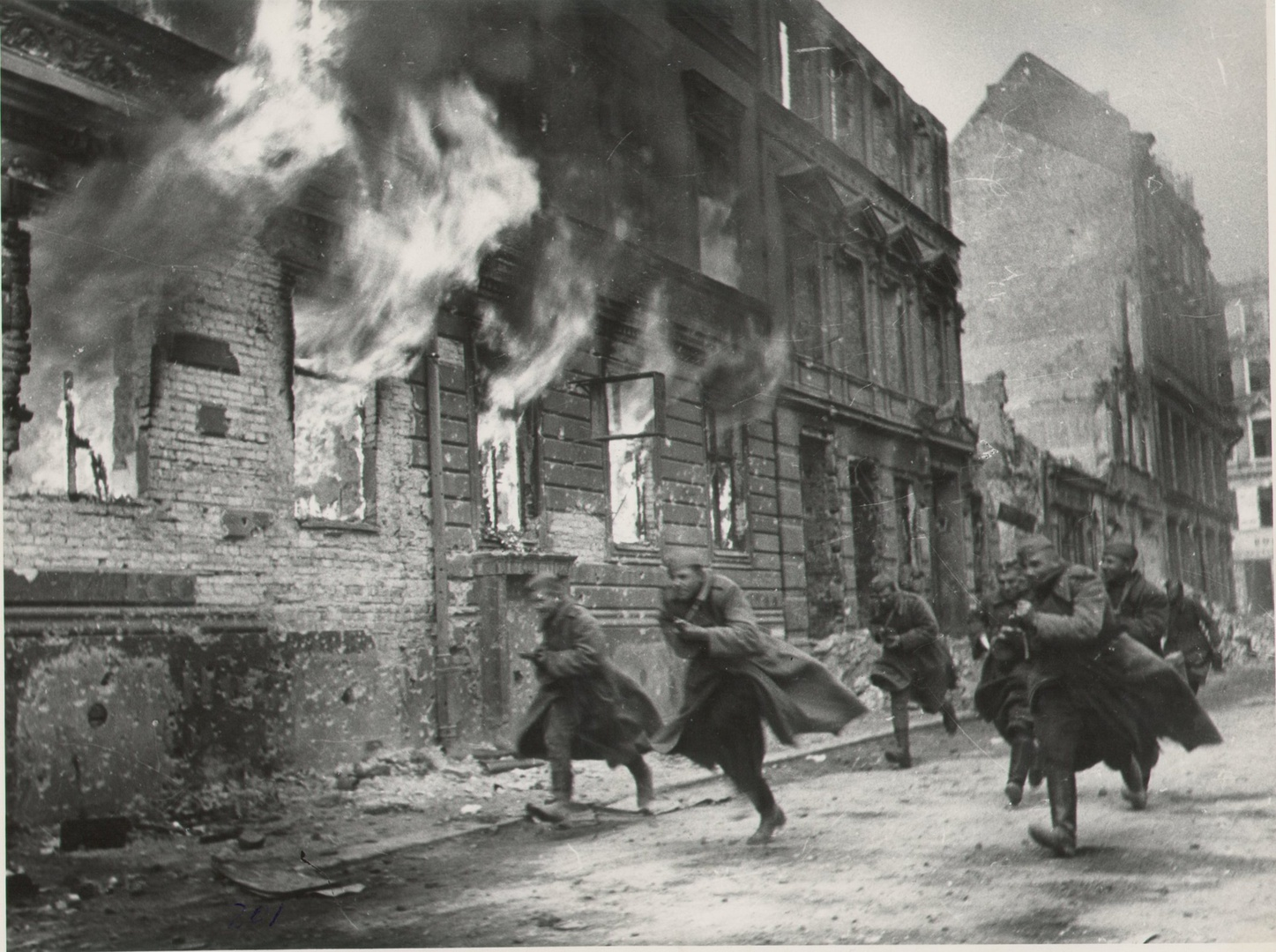
Soviet infantry advance on the streets of Berlin, 30 April

In the early hours of 29 April, the 150th and 171st Rifle divisions started to fan out from the Moltke bridgehead into the surrounding streets and buildings. Initially the Soviets were unable to bring forward artillery, as the combat engineers had not had time to strengthen the bridge or build an alternative. The only form of heavy weaponry available to the assault troops were individual Katyusha rockets lashed to short sections of railway lines. Major-General Shatilov's 150th Rifle Division had a particularly hard fight, capturing the heavily fortified Ministry of the Interior building. Lacking artillery, the men had to clear it room by room with grenades and sub-machine guns.

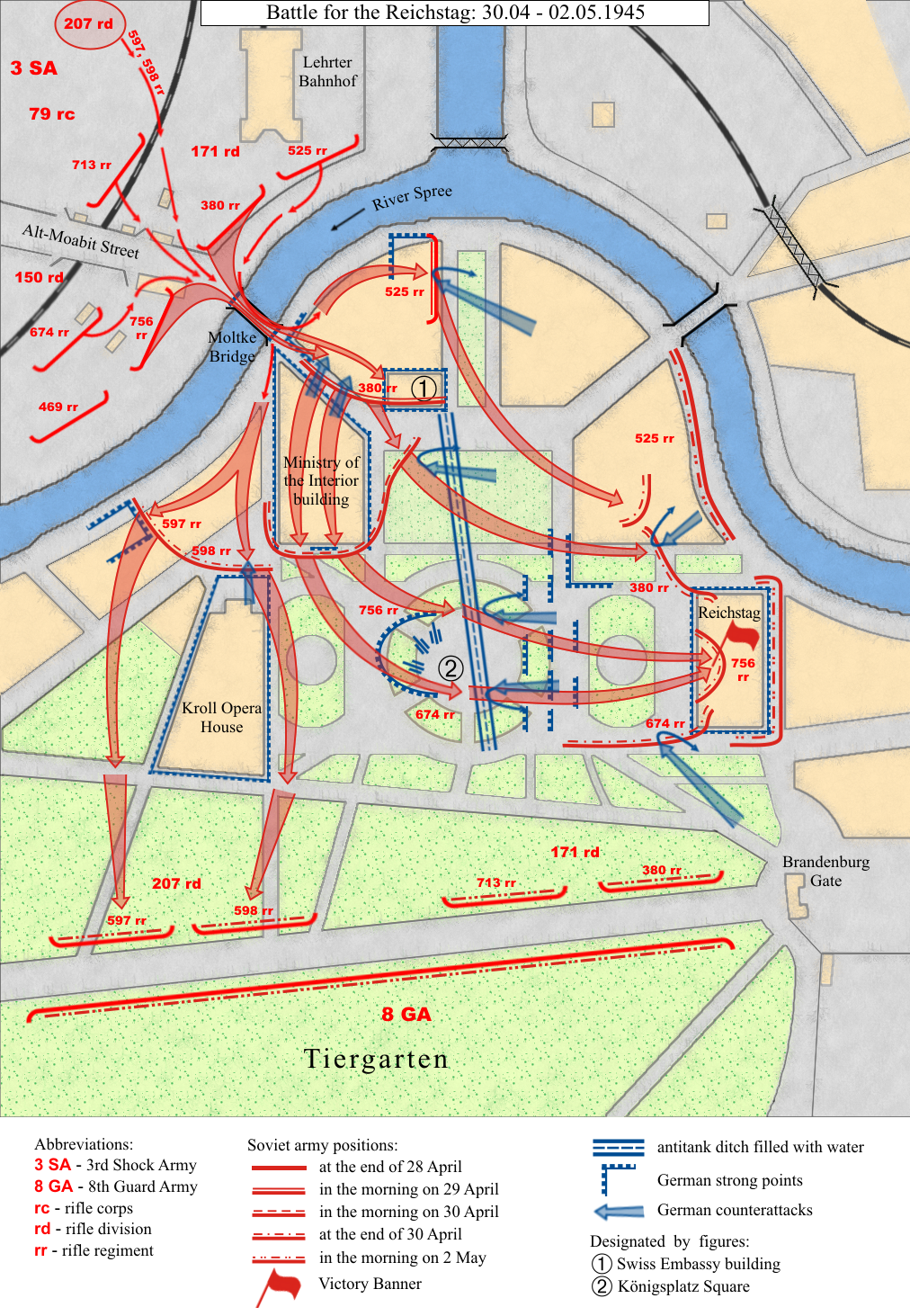
Battle for the Reichstag

In the south-east at dawn on 29 April, Colonel Antonov's 301st Rifle Division pressed on with its assault. After very heavy fighting, the formation managed to capture the Gestapo headquarters on Prinz-Albrecht-Strasse, but a Waffen SS counter-attack forced the regiments of the division to withdraw from the structure. Still confined to the building were seven inmates who had been spared in the massacre of other prisoners on 23 April. To the south-west Chuikov's 8th Guards Army attacked north across the Landwehr canal into the Tiergarten.

The Nordland Division was now under Mohnke's central command. All the men were exhausted from days and nights of continuous fighting. The Frenchmen of the Nordland had proved particularly good at destroying tanks, of the 108 Soviet tanks knocked out in the central district, they had accounted for about half of them. That afternoon the last two Knight's Crosses of the Third Reich were awarded; one went to Frenchman Eugène Vaulot, who had personally destroyed eight tanks, the other was awarded to SS-Sturmbannführer Friedrich Herzig, the commander of the 503 SS Heavy Panzer Battalion. Two other men received less prestigious awards for only knocking out five tanks each.

During the evening of 29 April, at Weidling's headquarters in the Bendlerblock, now within metres of the front line, Weidling discussed with his divisional commanders, the possibility of breaking out to the south-west to link up with the 12th Army, whose spearhead had reached the village of Ferch in Brandenburg on the banks of the Schwielowsee near Potsdam. The breakout was planned to start the next night at 22:00. Late in the evening, Krebs contacted General Alfred Jodl (Supreme Army Command) by radio: "Request immediate report. Firstly of the whereabouts of Wenck's spearheads. Secondly of time intended to attack. Thirdly of the location of the 9th Army. Fourthly of the precise place in which the 9th Army will break through. Fifthly of the whereabouts of General Rudolf Holste's spearhead." In the early morning of 30 April, Jodl replied to Krebs: "Firstly, Wenck's spearhead bogged down south of Schwielow Lake. Secondly, 12th Army therefore unable to continue attack on Berlin. Thirdly, bulk of 9th Army surrounded. Fourthly, Holste's Corps on the defensive."

By this time, several smaller Polish units had already taken part in the battle in Berlin (such as the 1st Polish Motorized Mortar Brigade, the 6th Polish Motorised Pontoon Battalion, and the 2nd Polish Howitzer Brigade). Soviet forces were lacking infantry support, and armored units, without infantry support, were taking heavy casualties. As of 30 April, the Soviet forces were joined by the Polish 1st Tadeusz Kościuszko Infantry Division after a request from the Soviet command for infantry reinforcements. Originally, one infantry regiment was to support the 1st Mechanised Corps, and two, the 12th Guards Tank Corps; contrary to the original plan, two regiments (1st and 2nd) ended up supporting the 1st Corps, and only one (3rd) the 12th Corps. The 3rd Polish Infantry Regiment was operating with the 66th Guards Tank Brigade of the 12th Guards Tank Corps. The 1st Polish Infantry Regiment was split up into "combat teams" supporting the 19th and 35th Mechanized Brigades, with the 2nd Polish Infantry Regiment supporting the 219th Tank Brigade; all units of the Soviet 1st Mechanized Corps. Upon arrival, the Polish forces found that the Soviet units had suffered tremendous losses; the 19th and 35th Mechanized Brigades had sustained over 90% casualties, and thus the Polish 1st Infantry Regiment originally assigned to support them had to, in effect, take over their tasks. The 66th Guards Tank Brigade of the 12th Corps that received the 3rd Polish Infantry Regiment for support had similarly taken heavy losses, having already lost 82 tanks due to insufficient infantry cover.

==== Battle for the Reichstag ====
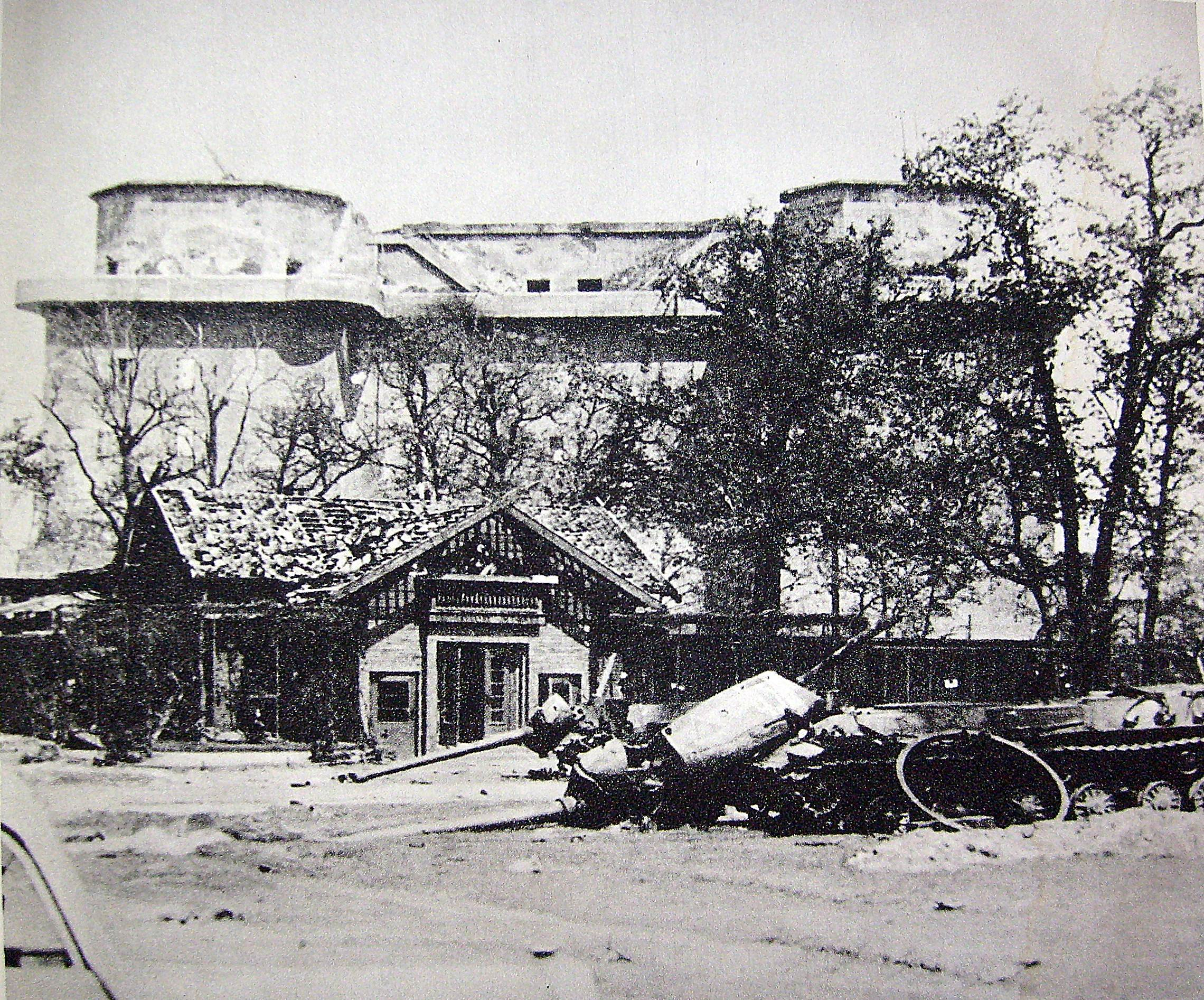
Zoo flak tower after the end of fighting, May 1945

At 06:00 on 30 April the 150th Rifle Division had still not captured the upper floors of the Ministry of the Interior, but while the fighting was still going on, the 150th launched an attack from there across the 400 metres of Königsplatz towards the Reichstag. For the Soviets, the Reichstag was the symbol of the Third Reich even though it had never been restored by the Nazis after the 1933 fire. It was of such symbolic value that the Soviets wanted to capture it before the May Day parade in Moscow. The assault was not an easy one. The Germans had dug a complicated network of trenches around the building and a collapsed tunnel had filled with water from the Spree forming a moat across Königsplatz. The initial infantry assault was decimated by cross fire from the Reichstag and the Kroll Opera House on the western side of Königsplatz. By now the Spree had been bridged and the Soviets were able to bring up tanks and artillery to support fresh assaults by the infantry, some of which were tasked with out-flanking the Opera House and attacking it from the north-west. By 10:00 the soldiers of the 150th had reached the moat, but accurate fire from 12.8 cm FlaK 40 anti-aircraft guns, two kilometres away high on the Zoo flak tower, prevented any further successful advance across the moat during daylight. Throughout the rest of the day, as ninety artillery pieces, some as large as the 203 mm howitzer, as well as Katyusha rocket launchers, bombarded the Reichstag and its defensive trenches. Colonel Negoda's 171st Rifle Division, on the left flank of the 150th, continued to capture the buildings of the diplomatic quarter to the north of Königsplatz.

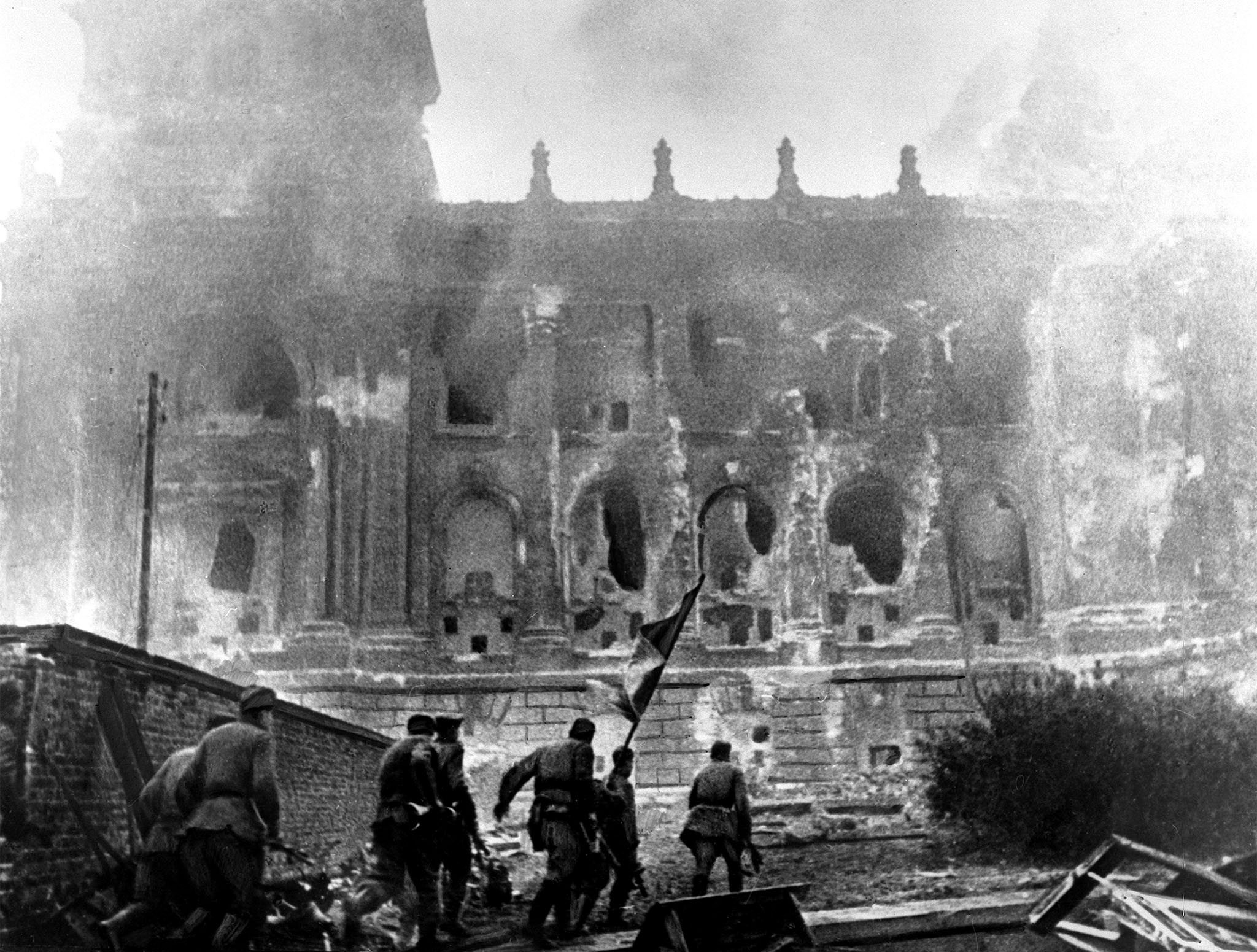
A Soviet assault group advances on the Reichstag.

As the perimeter shrank and the surviving defenders fell back on the centre, they became concentrated. By now, there were about 10,000 soldiers in the city centre, who were being assaulted from all sides. One of the other main thrusts was along Wilhelmstrasse on which the Air Ministry building, which was built of reinforced concrete, was situated. It was pounded by large concentrations of Soviet artillery. The remaining German Tiger tanks of the Hermann von Salza battalion took up positions in the east of the Tiergarten to defend the centre against the 3rd Shock Army (which, although heavily engaged around the Reichstag, was also flanking the area by advancing through the northern Tiergarten) and the 8th Guards Army advancing through the south of the Tiergarten. These Soviet forces had effectively cut the sausage-shaped area held by the Germans in half and made an escape to the west for those German troops in the centre much more difficult.

During the morning, Mohnke informed Hitler the centre would be able to hold for less than two days. Later that morning, Weidling informed Hitler in person that the defenders would probably exhaust their ammunition that night and again asked Hitler permission to break out. At about 13:00, Weidling, who was back in his headquarters in the Bendlerblock, finally received Hitler's permission to attempt a breakout. During the afternoon, Hitler shot himself and Braun took cyanide. In accordance with Hitler's instructions, the bodies were burned in the garden of the Reich Chancellery. In accordance with Hitler's last will and testament, Joseph Goebbels, the Minister for Public Enlightenment and Propaganda, became the new "Head of Government" and Chancellor of Germany (Reichskanzler). At 3:15 am, Reichskanzler Goebbels and Bormann sent a radio message to Admiral Dönitz informing him of Hitler's death. Per Hitler's last wishes, Dönitz was appointed as the new "President of Germany" (Reichspräsident).

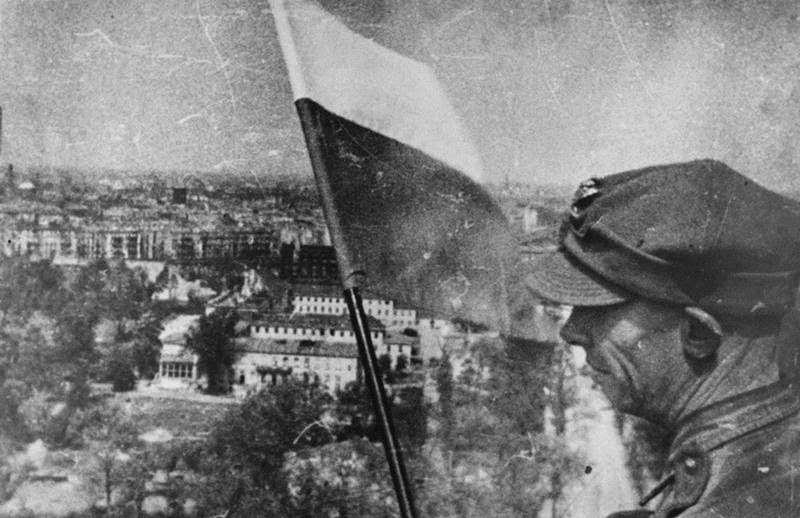
Polish flag raised on the top of Berlin Victory Column on 2 May 1945

Starting from 16:00 on 30 April, the 1st Battalion of the Polish 1st Regiment (assigned to the region of 35th Mechanized Brigade) begun an assault on a barricade on Pestalozzistrasse, a major obstacle which made previous tank attacks in that direction suicidal. The Polish 2nd and 3rd Regiments cleared the path through the barricades on Goethestrasse and Schillerstrasse for the tanks of the Soviet 19th Brigade.

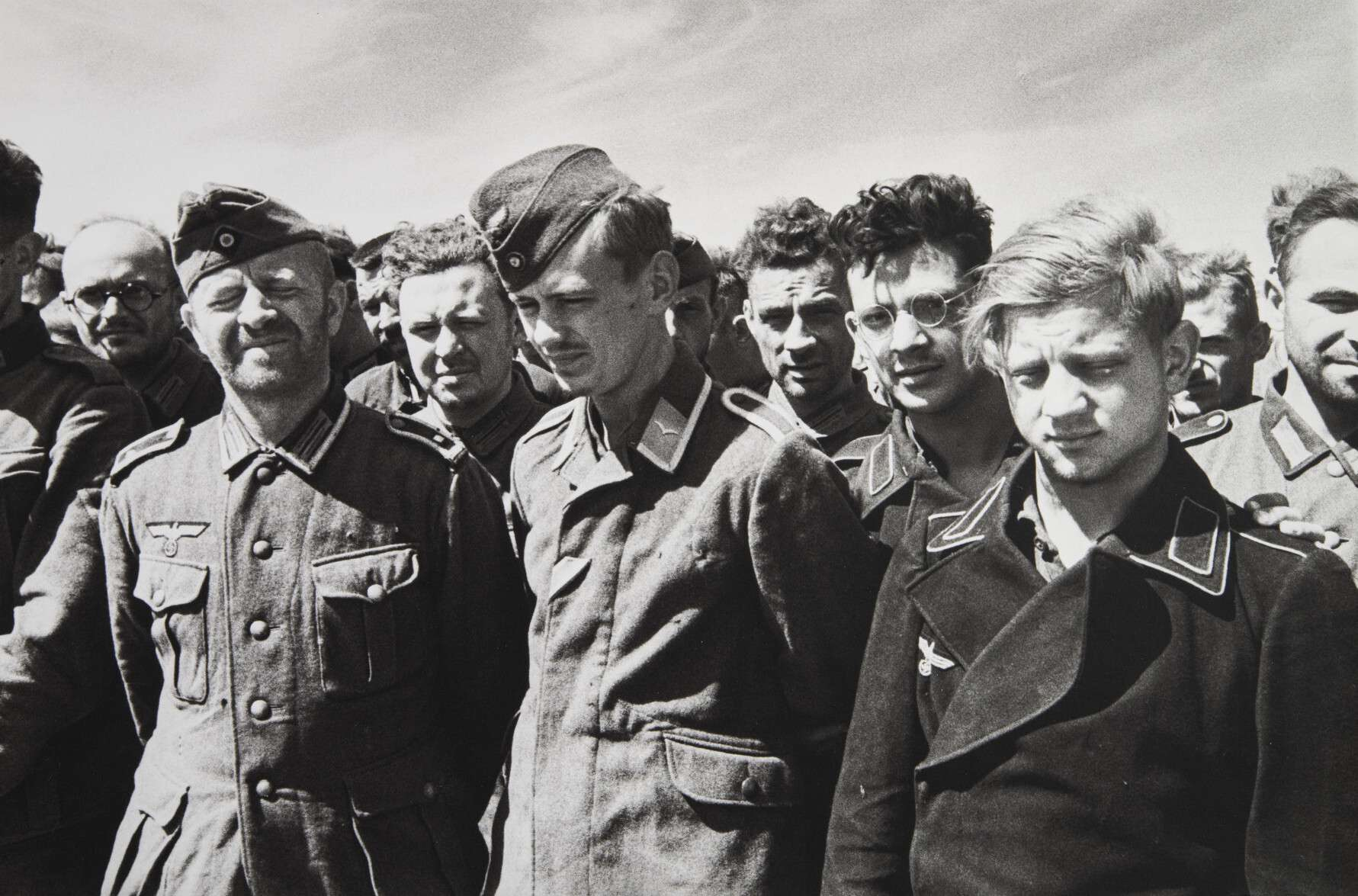
Surrendered German soldiers in Berlin

Because of the smoke, dusk came early to the centre of Berlin. At 18:00 hours, while Weidling and his staff finalized their breakout plans in the Bendlerblock, three regiments of the Soviet 150th Rifle Division, under cover of a heavy artillery barrage and closely supported by tanks, assaulted the Reichstag. All the windows were bricked up, but the soldiers managed to force the main doors and entered the main hall. The German garrison, of about 1,000 defenders (a mixture of sailors, SS and Hitler Youth) fired down on the Soviets from above, turning the main hall into a medieval style killing field. Suffering many casualties, the Soviets got beyond the main hall and started to work their way up through the building. The fire and subsequent wartime damage had turned the building's interior into a maze of rubble and debris amongst which the German defenders were strongly dug in. The Soviet infantry were forced to clear them out. Fierce room-to-room fighting ensued. As May Day approached Soviet troops reached the roof, but fighting continued inside. Moscow claimed that they hoisted the Red Flag on the top of the Reichstag at 22:50, however Beevor points out that this may have been an exaggeration as "Soviet propaganda was fixated with the idea of the Reichstag being captured by 1 May". Whatever the truth, the fighting continued as there was still a large contingent of German soldiers down in the basement. The Germans were well stocked with food and ammunition and launched counter-attacks against the Red Army, leading to close fighting in and around the Reichstag. Close combat raged throughout the night and the coming day of 1 May, until the evening when some German troops pulled out of the building and crossed the Friedrichstraße S-Bahn Station, where they moved into the ruins hours before the main breakout across the Spree. About 300 of the last German combatants surrendered. A further 200 defenders were dead and another 500 were already hors de combat, lying wounded in the basement, many before the final assault had started.

=== Capture of Charlottenburg ===
The barricade at Pestalozzistrasse was taken on the morning of 1 May, allowing Soviet tanks of the 34th Brigade to advance and to reestablish contact with the 19th Mechanized Brigade supported by the 2nd and 3rd Battalion of the 1st Regiment, which pushed through the barricades at Goethestrasse and Schillerstrasse. Further, heavily fortified German positions in and around the church at the Karl August-Platz were taken, allowing the Polish and Soviet units to advance along the Goethestrasse and Schillerstrasse. In the meantime, the Polish 2nd Regiment, with its own artillery support, took the heavily fortified Technische Hochschule Berlin that was situated in the triangle between Charlottenburgerstrasse, Hardenbergstrasse and Jebenstrasse. With support by the Polish 3rd Infantry Regiment, the Soviet 66th Guards Tank Brigade (which had only 15 tanks) broke through Franklinstrasse and advanced towards the Berlin-Tiergarten station. The stronghold of the Tiergarten (S-Bahn) station was then secured by the 3rd Infantry Regiment. Thereafter, Polish and Soviet units took control of the Zoologischer Garten station and the railway line between them. By these actions, the Red Army had broken through the central Berlin west line of defence.

=== End of the battle ===
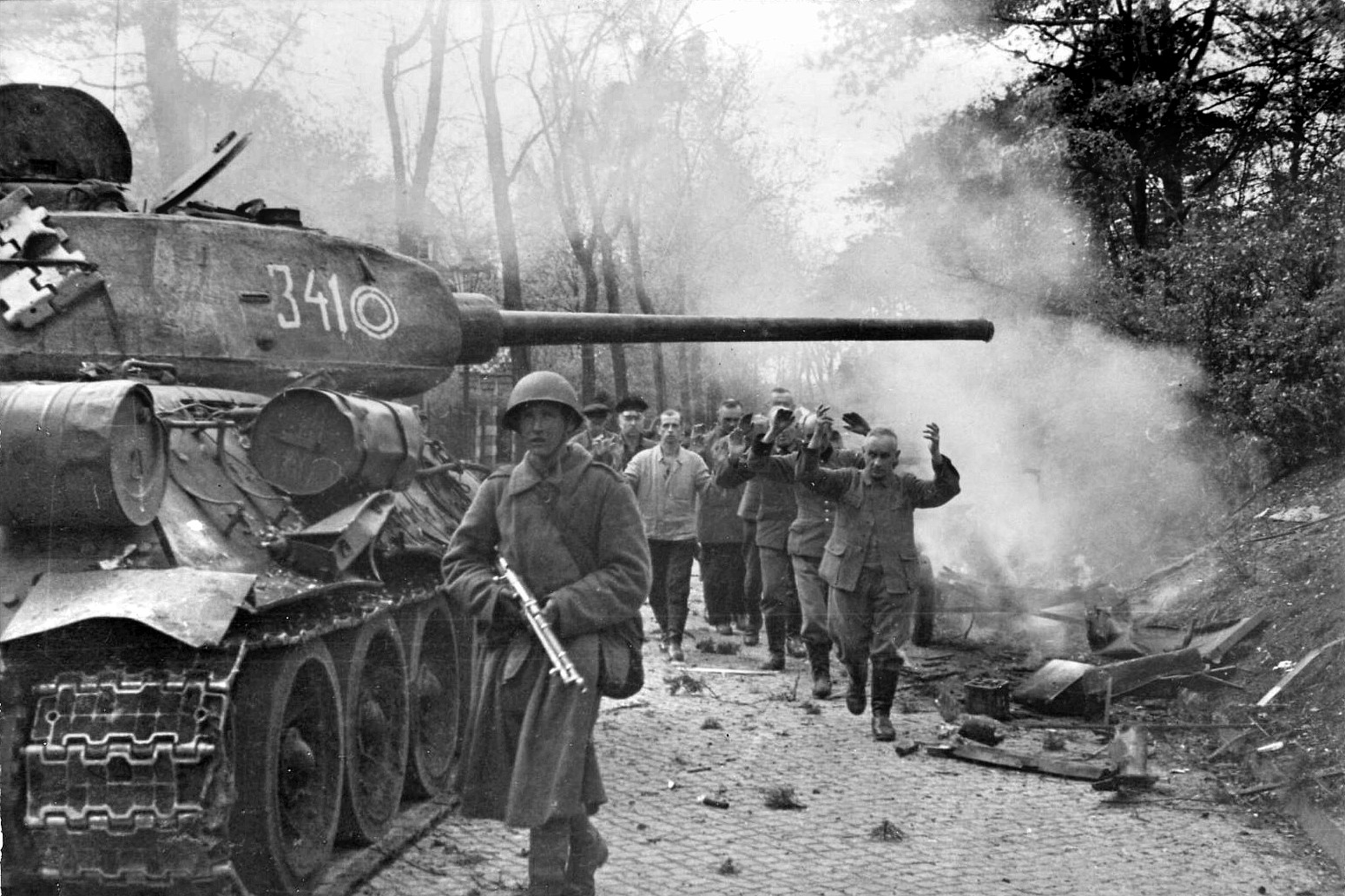
T-34 tank from the 7th Guards Tank Corps and captured Volkssturm militamen on the streets of Berlin

At about 04:00 on 1 May, Krebs talked to Chuikov, commander of the Soviet 8th Guards Army. Krebs returned empty-handed after refusing to agree to an unconditional surrender. Only Reichskanzler Goebbels now had the authority to agree to an unconditional surrender. In the late afternoon, Goebbels had his children poisoned. At about 20:00, Goebbels and his wife, Magda, left the bunker and close to the entrance bit on a cyanide ampoule, and either shot themselves at the same time or were given a coup de grâce immediately afterwards by the SS guard detailed to dispose of their bodies. As promised by the Soviets, at 10:45 on 1 May they unleashed a "hurricane of fire" on the German pocket in the centre to force the Germans to surrender unconditionally.

For a brief period after Hitler's suicide, Goebbels had been Germany's Reichskanzler. On 1 May, after Goebbels' own suicide, for an equally brief period, Reichspräsident Admiral Karl Dönitz appointed Ludwig von Krosigk as Reichskanzler. The headquarters of the Dönitz government were located around Flensburg, along with Mürwik, near the Danish border. Accordingly, the Dönitz administration was referred to as the Flensburg Government.

The commanders of two formidable Berlin fortresses agreed to surrender to the Soviets, so sparing both sides the losses involved in further bombardment and assault. The commander of the Zoo flak tower (that had proved impervious to direct hits from 203 mm howitzer shells) was asked to surrender on 30 April; after a long delay a message was sent back to the Soviets on 1 May informing them that the garrison would surrender to the Soviets at midnight that night. The reason for the delay was because the garrison intended to join in the attempt at a breakout. The other fortress was the Spandau Citadel of Trace italienne design which although several hundred years old presented a difficult structure to storm. After negotiations, the citadel's commander surrendered to Lieutenant-General F.I. Perkhorovich's 47th Army just after 15:00 on 1 May.

==== Breakout ====
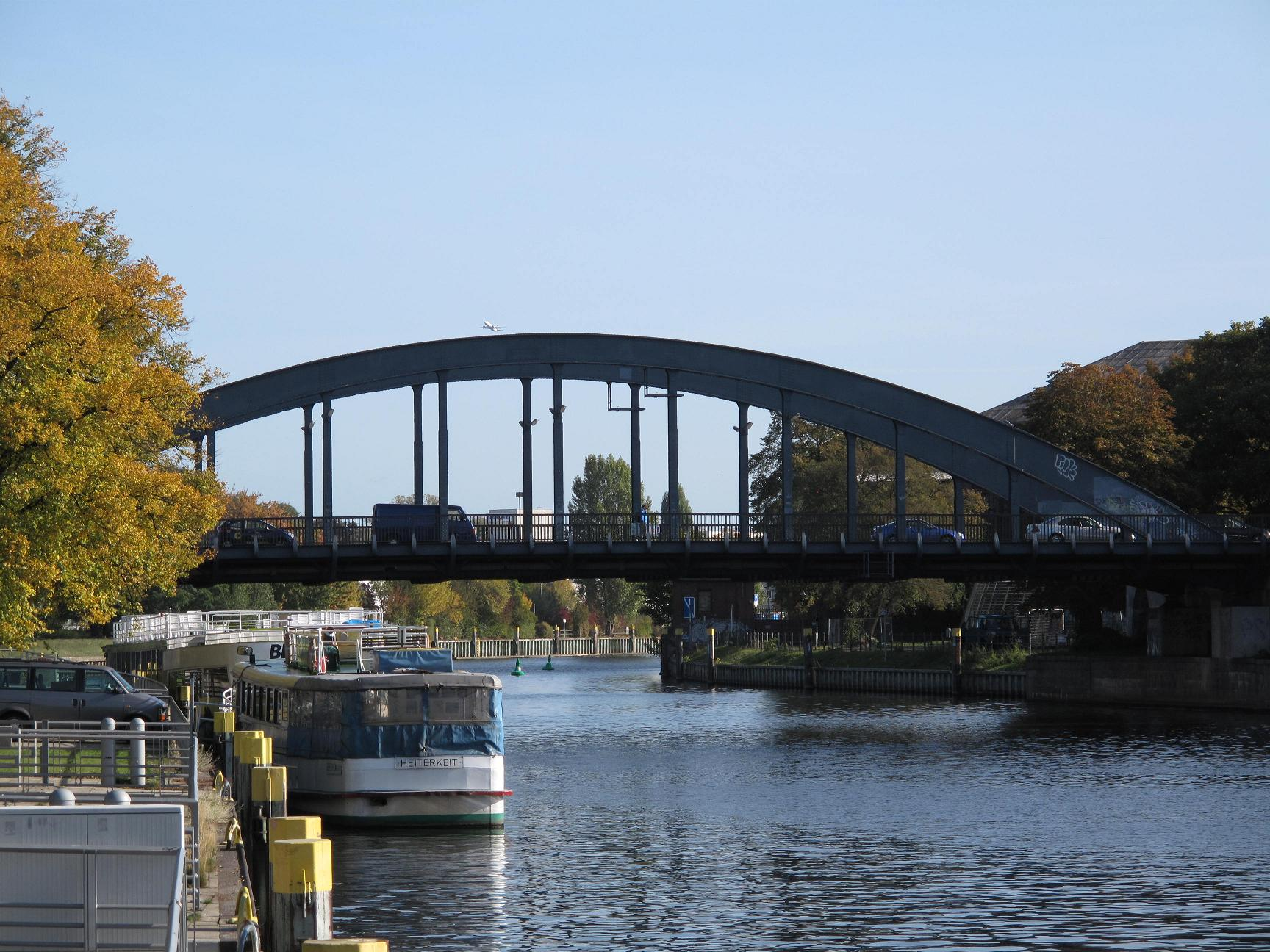
Charlotten Bridge. Rebuilt in 1926, it survived World War II.

Weidling had given the order for the survivors to break out to the north-west starting at around 21:00 hours on 1 May. The breakout started later than planned at around 23:00 hours. The first group from the Reich Chancellery was led by Mohnke. Bormann, Werner Naumann, and remaining Führerbunker personnel followed. Burgdorf, who played a key role in the death of Erwin Rommel, committed suicide along with Krebs. Mohnke's group avoided the Weidendammer Bridge (over which the mass breakout took place) and crossed by a footbridge, but his group became split. A Tiger tank that spearheaded the first attempt to storm the Weidendammer Bridge was destroyed. There followed two more attempts and on the third attempt, made around 1:00, Bormann and SS doctor Ludwig Stumpfegger in another group from the Reich Chancellery managed to cross the Spree. They were reported to have died a short distance from the bridge, their bodies seen and identified by Artur Axmann who followed the same route.

Krukenberg and many of the survivors of the remnants of the Nordland Division crossed the Spree shortly before dawn but could not break through and were forced back into the centre. There they split up; some discarded their uniforms and tried to pass themselves off as civilians, but most were either killed or, like Krukenberg, captured. An attempt to break out northward along the Schönhauser Allee by German troops on the north-eastern side of the central defence area failed because the Soviets were now aware that breakout attempts were being made and were hurriedly putting cordons in place to stop them. The remnants of the Münchenberg Division (five tanks, four artillery pieces, and a handful of troops) and the remnants of the 18th Panzer Grenadier and 9th Parachute divisions broke out of the centre westward through the Tiergarten. They were followed by thousands of stragglers and civilians. Spandau was still in the hands of a Hitler Youth detachment, so an attempt was made to force a passage across the Charlotten Bridge over the Havel. Despite heavy shelling which killed many, German weight of numbers meant that they were able to drive the Soviet infantry back and many thousands crossed into Spandau. The armoured vehicles that crossed the bridge made for Staaken.

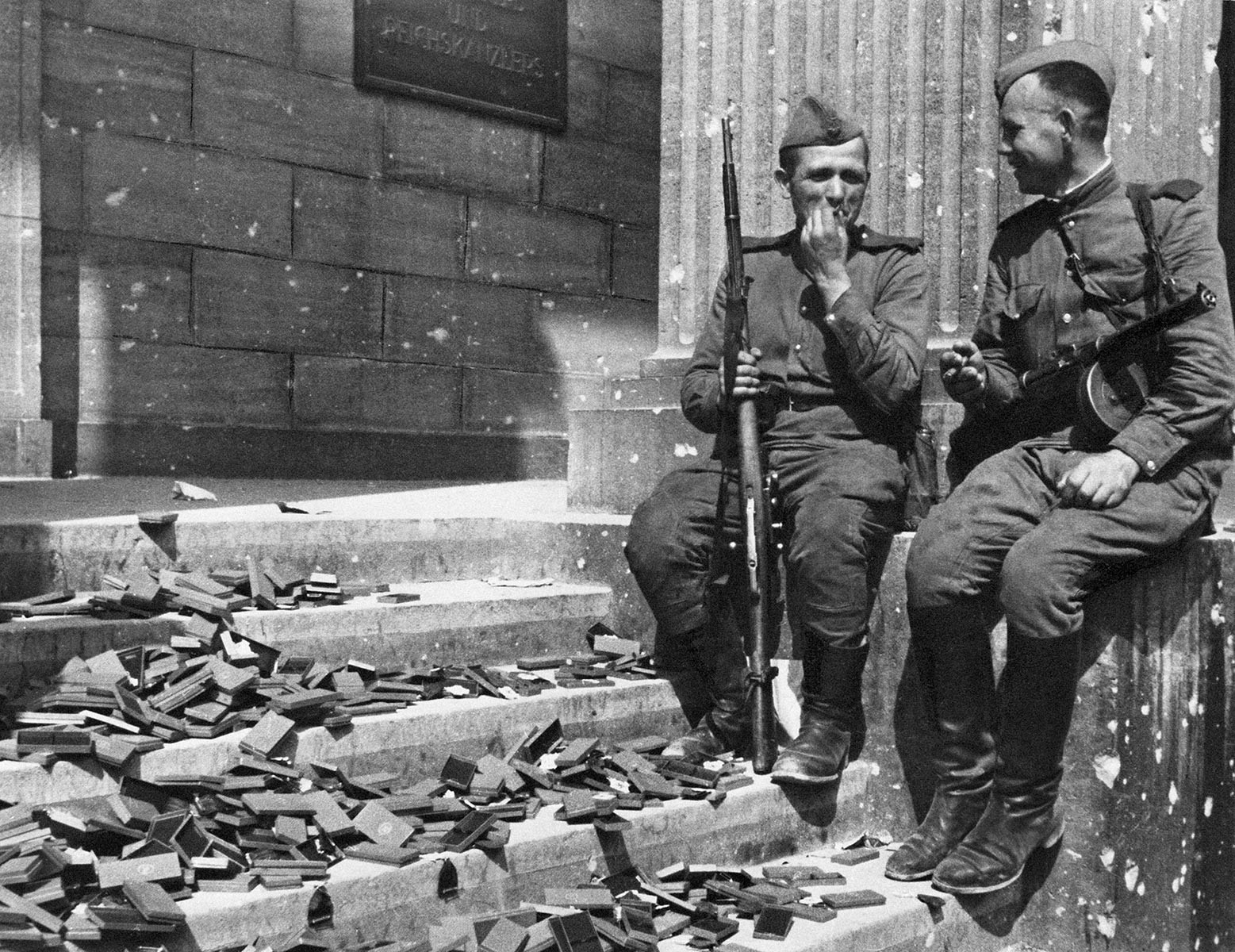
Soviet soldiers smoking on the steps of the Reich Chancellery

Mohnke (and what was left of his group) could not break through the Soviet rings. Most were taken prisoner and some committed suicide. General Mohnke and the others who had been in the Führerbunker were interrogated by SMERSH. Only a handful of survivors reached the Elbe and surrendered to the Western Allies. The majority were killed or captured by the Soviets. The number of German soldiers and civilians killed attempting the breakout is unknown.

==== Capitulation ====
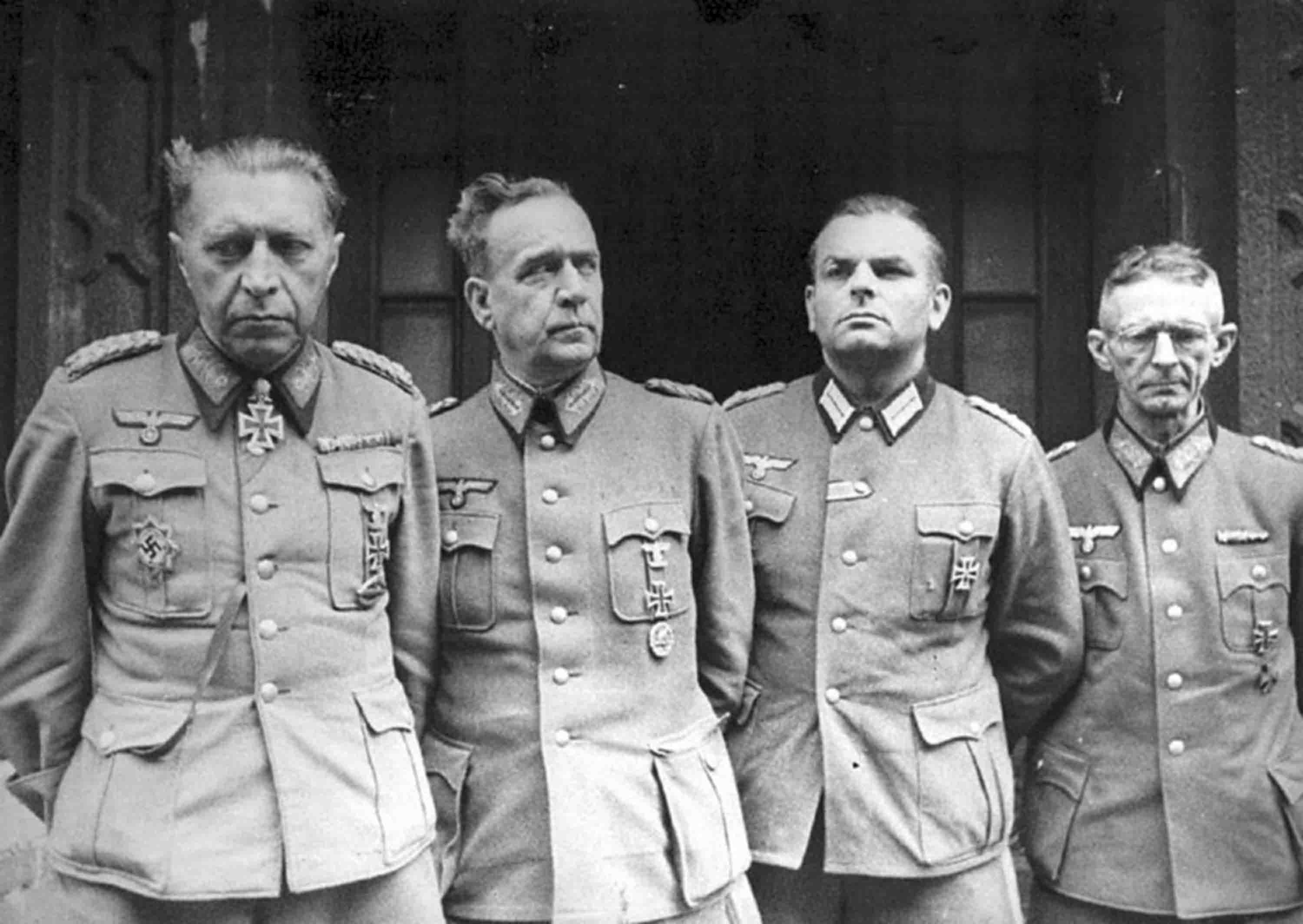
General Helmut Weidling (left) - the last commander of the Berlin defense appointed by Hitler, surrendered on May 2, along with members of his staff

On the morning of 2 May, the Soviets stormed the Reich Chancellery. In the official Soviet version, the battle was similar to that of the battle for the Reichstag. There was an assault over Wilhelmplatz and into the building with a howitzer to blast open the front doors and several battles within the building. Major Anna Nikulina, a political officer with Lieutenant-General I. P. Rossly's 9th Rifle Corps of the 5th Shock Army carried and unfurled the red flag on the roof. Beevor claims that the official Soviet description is an exaggeration, as most of the German combat troops had left in the breakouts the night before, and resistance must have been far less than that inside the Reichstag.

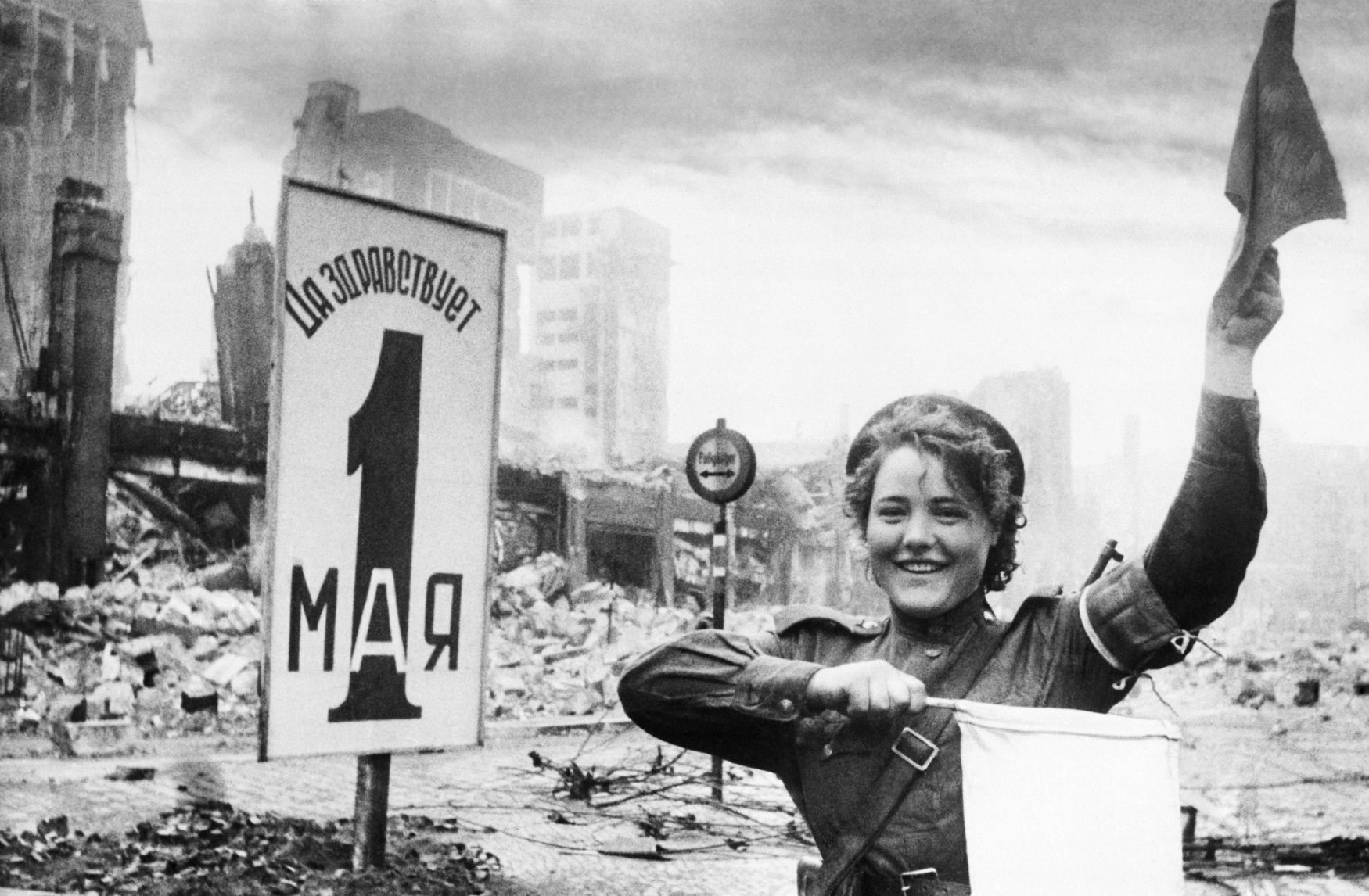
Soviet traffic control officer Maria Shalneva on a street in Berlin, May 1945

At 01:00 hours, the Soviets picked up radio message from the German LVI Corps requesting a cease-fire and stating that emissaries would come under a white flag to Potsdamer bridge. General Weidling surrendered with his staff at 06:00 hours. He was taken to see Lieutenant-General Chuikov at 8:23 am. Chuikov, who had commanded the successful defence of Stalingrad, asked: "You are the commander of the Berlin garrison?" Weidling replied: "Yes, I am the commander of the LVI Panzer Corps." Chuikov then asked: "Where is Krebs? What did he say?" Weidling replied: "I saw him yesterday in the Reich Chancellery." Weidling then added: "I thought he would commit suicide." In the discussions that followed, Weidling agreed to an unconditional surrender of the city of Berlin. He agreed to order the city's defenders to surrender to the Soviets. Under the direction of Chuikov and Soviet General Vasily Sokolovsky (Chief of staff of the 1st Ukrainian Front), Weidling put his order to surrender in writing.

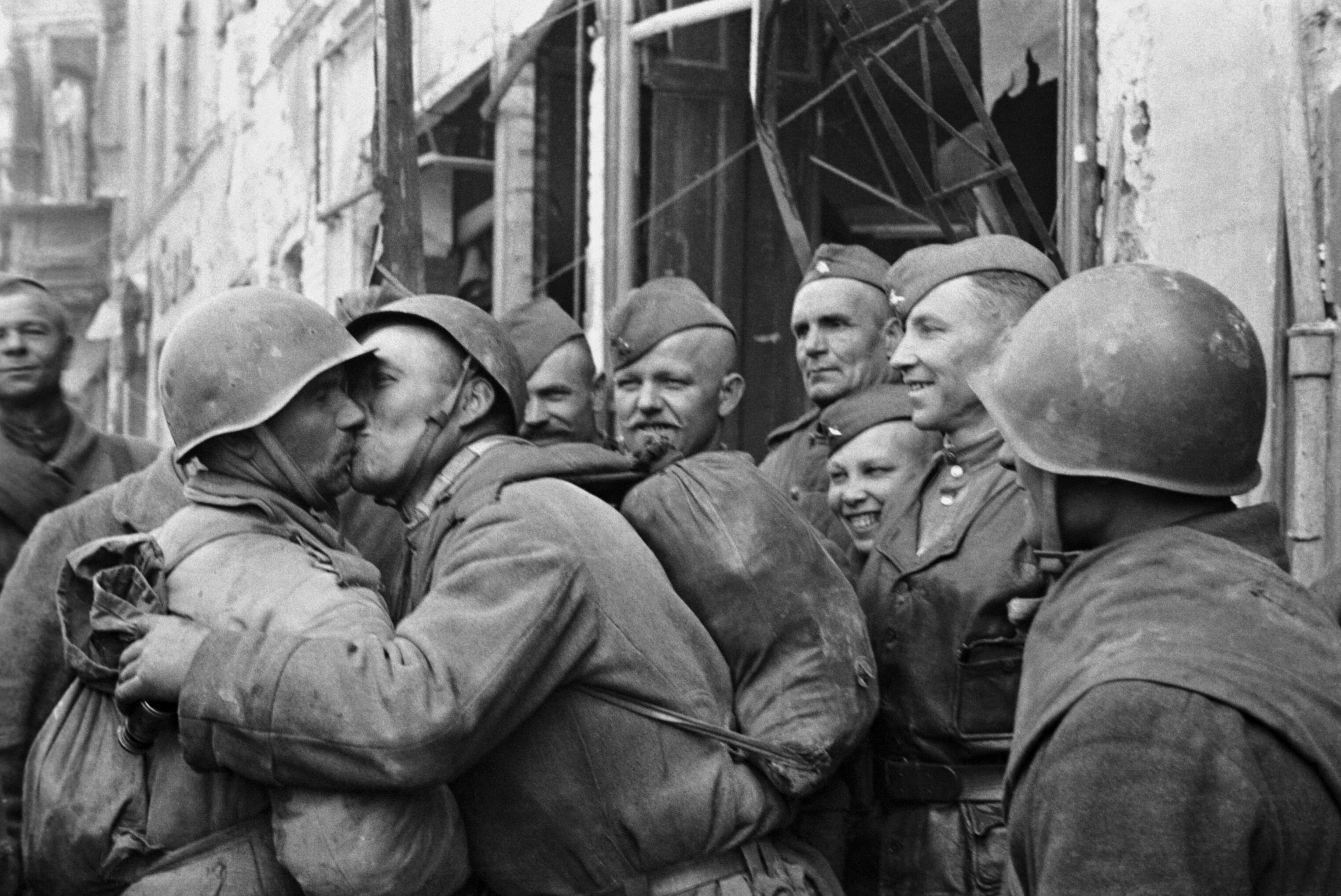
Red Army privates Aleksey Markov and Ivan Mazyuk, residents of the same village serving in different units, embracing upon meeting each other in Berlin

The 350-strong garrison of the Zoo flak tower finally left the building. There was sporadic fighting in a few isolated buildings where some SS still refused to surrender. The Soviets simply blasted any such building to rubble. Most Germans, soldiers and civilians, were grateful to receive food issued at Red Army soup kitchens. The Soviets went house to house and rounded up anyone in a uniform including firemen and railwaymen, which led to them later exaggerating the total number of German troops in the city.

== Aftermath ==
The Red Army made a major effort to feed the residents of the city which began on Colonel-General Nikolai Berzarin's orders. However in many areas, vengeful Soviet troops looted, raped an estimated 100,000 females, and murdered civilians for several weeks.

== See also ==
- Zero hour (1945)
- End of World War II in Europe
- German Instrument of Surrender
- Race to Berlin
