= Charlotten Bridge =

Charlotten Bridge Charlottenbrücke
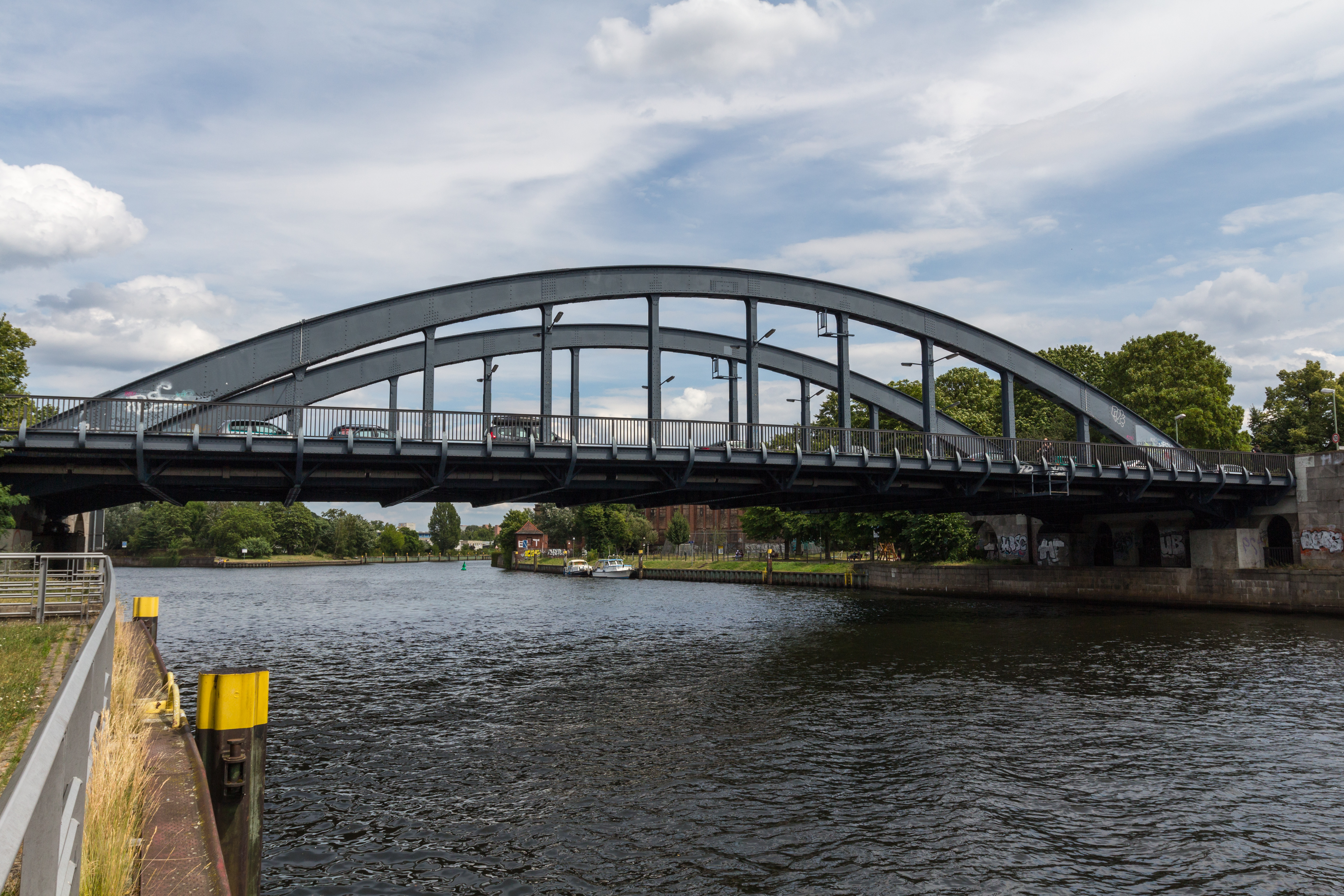
- view of the Charlotten Bridge from the banks of the river Havel
- Coordinates: 52.5351°N 13.2062°E
- Crosses: Havel
- Locale: Spandau
- Begins: Old town of Spandau
- Ends: East bank

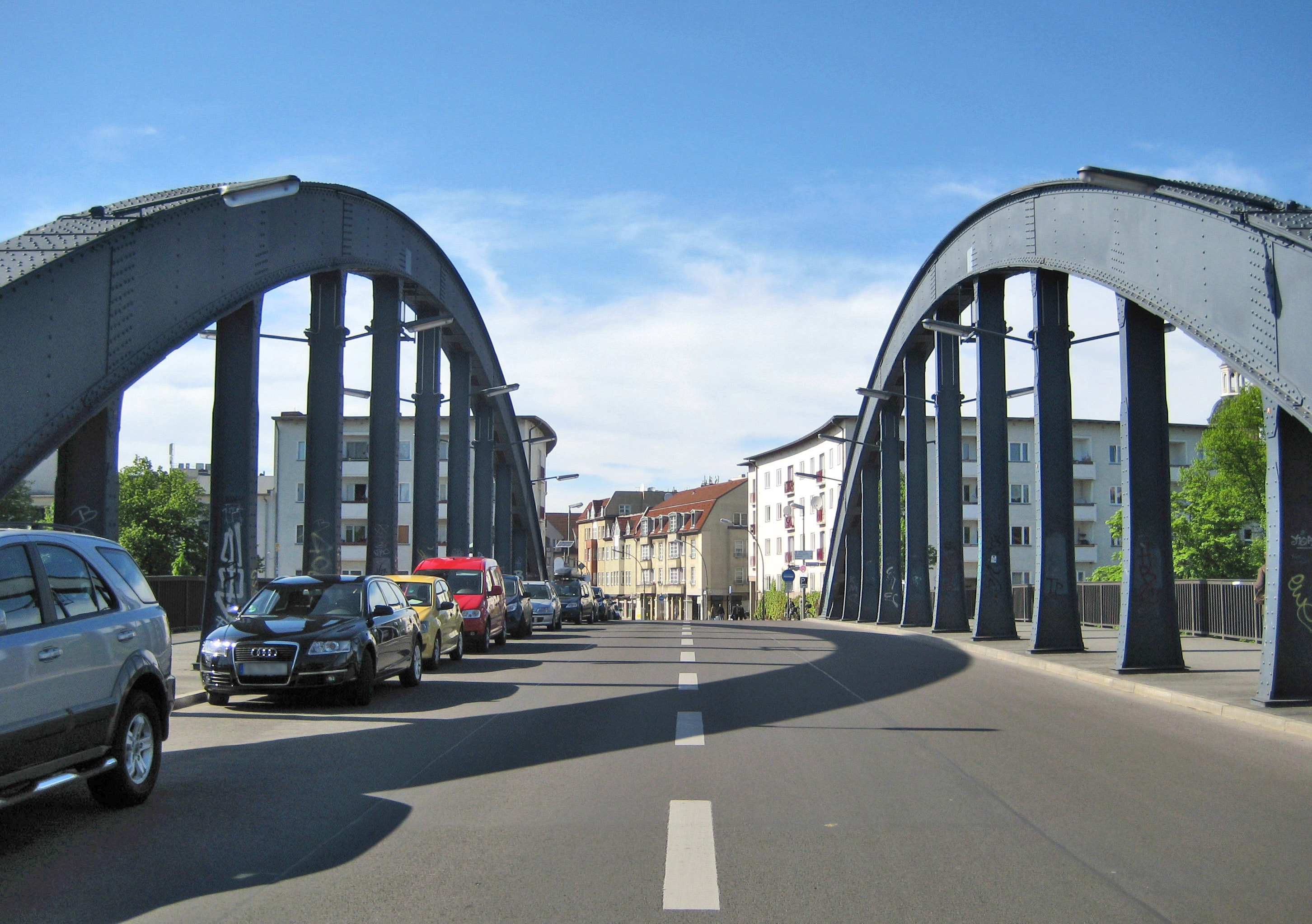
View over the Charlotten Bridge into Spandau

Charlotten Bridge (German Charlottenbrücke) in Spandau links the old town of Spandau on the west bank of the Havel with the east bank.

It was one of the few bridges over which some of the German garrison of Berlin were able to escape during the night of 1 May 1945 just hours before the city fell to Soviet forces (see Battle in Berlin).
