= Erich Bärenfänger =

German general

- Born: 12 January 1915; Menden, German Empire
- Died: 2 May 1945 (aged 30); Berlin, Nazi Germany
- Military career
- Allegiance: Nazi Germany
- Branch: Army (Wehrmacht)
- Rank: Generalmajor
- Unit: 50th Infantry Division
- Conflicts: Battle of Berlin
- Awards: Knight's Cross of the Iron Cross with Oak Leaves and Swords

Erich Bärenfänger (12 January 1915 – 2 May 1945) was a German general during World War II. He was a recipient of the Knight's Cross of the Iron Cross with Oak Leaves and Swords of Nazi Germany. In the final days of the war, Bärenfänger was commander of several defense sectors during the Battle of Berlin; he committed suicide on 2 May 1945.

== Berlin, 1945 ==
Towards the end of World War II, Bärenfänger took part in the Battle for Berlin. On 24 April, due to the direct command of Hitler, Bärenfänger was given command of defence sectors A and one day later also command of sector B. Bärenfänger mounted at least two unsuccessful armored attacks northwards up the Schönhauser Allee. The second was on 1 May.

Members of SS-Brigadeführer Wilhelm Mohnke's "break out group" saw quite a sight thanks to Bärenfänger. On 1 May, the group left the surrounded central government sector, which included the Führerbunker. As they made their escape, there before them they saw a "host" of new Tiger II tanks and "artillery pieces" arrayed around the Flak tower as if "on parade". Bärenfänger was allegedly seated in the turret cupola of one of the Tigers thus arrayed. On 2 May, Bärenfänger, a devoted Nazi, committed suicide with his young wife and her brother in a side street of Berlin.

== Awards ==
- Iron Cross (1939) 2nd Class (12 June 1940) & 1st Class (21 June 1940)
- Infantry Assault Badge in Silver (23 July 1941)
- Knight's Cross of the Order of the Crown of Romania with Swords 5th Class (13 August 1941)
- Honour Roll Clasp of the Army (14 August 1942)
- German Cross in Gold on 26 December 1941 as Leutnant of the Reserves in the 7./Infanterie-Regiment 123
- Knight's Cross of the Iron Cross with Oak Leaves and Swords
  - Knight's Cross on 27 August 1942 as Oberleutnant and leader of the III./Infanterie-Regiment 123
  - 243rd Oak Leaves on 17 May 1943 as Hauptmann and commander of the III./Grenadier-Regiment 123
  - 45th Swords on 23 January 1944 as Major and commander of the III./Grenadier-Regiment 123
- Bulgarian Order of Bravery (7 February 1942)
- Medal of the Royal Bulgarian infantry in Silver (7 February 1942)

Military offices
Preceded by Ernst Kaether	Commanders of the Berlin Defense Area (Deputy to Adolf Hitler); 22 April 1945	Succeeded by Helmuth Weidling
