= 212th Infantry Division (Wehrmacht) =

- 212. Infanterie-Division
- Unit insignia
- Active: August 1939 – 1945
- Country: Nazi Germany
- Branch: Army
- Type: Infantry
- Size: Division
- Engagements: Battle of France; Eastern Front (World War II); Battle of the Bulge

The 212th Infantry Division was a German infantry division that fought in World War II. It was destroyed in Lithuania, and reconstituted as the 578th Volksgrenadier Division before being renamed the 212th Volksgrenadier Division.

== Divisional history ==
=== 212th Infantry Division ===
The 212th Infantry Division was raised on 26 August 1939 and remained on garrison duty in Germany until March 1941, when it spent three months as a coastal defense unit along the English Channel. In November 1941 it was transferred to the Eastern Front where it joined Army Group North near Leningrad and along the Volkhov Front. It continued with Army Group North until the summer of 1944, when it had been pushed back to Lithuania and was transferred to the control of Army Group Center. The division was destroyed there between August and September.

=== 578th Volksgrenadier Division ===
The survivors of the destroyed division were immediately reconstituted as the 578th Volksgrenadier Division, which was renamed as 212th Volksgrenadier Division almost as soon as it had been formed.

=== 212th Volksgrenadier Division ===
The division retained a number of experienced officers and Non-Commissioned Officers (NCOs). The replacements received were mostly from Bavaria and were rated as above-average. Rebuilt to full personnel strength the division had weaknesses shared by almost all Volksgrenadier divisions: not enough communications equipment and a lack of assault guns. The reconstituted division transferred to the western front in December 1944. The division was assigned to the LXXX Corps of the 7th Army which formed the southern shoulder of the German armies attacking in the Ardennes. General der Panzertruppe Erich Brandenberger, the German Seventh Army commander, rated the 212th Volksgrenadier Division as his best division. Because of this it was assigned the mission of protecting the southern flank of the Seventh Army. Placed opposite of the US Army's 4th Infantry Division, they would need to pin down as many American units as possible, in order to prevent the transfer of reserves against the main effort.

Although the troops under Sensfuss had a numerical superiority, they were at a disadvantage in one regard: The Americans had tanks, while they did not. On December 16, after making a successful crossing of the Sauer river, the 212th Volksgrendier Division was able to infiltrate through American lines, push into the streets of Echternach, and overwhelm all major resistance. They were also able to surround but not defeat a fairly large U.S. battle group at Berdorf. Over the next two days, they were able to penetrate as far as Scheidgen before digging in to repulse numerous counter-attacks by the Americans. After several days of slow progress, however, the Ardennes offensive as a whole was looking increasingly non-viable. By December 28, Brandenberger ordered the 212th Volksgrenadier Division to withdraw back to its starting positions. It went on to participate in subsequent defensive operations along the Rhine, until surrendering to the Americans near the end of the war.

== Commanding officers ==
=== 212th Infantry Division ===
- Generalmajor Walter Friedrichs (? August 1939 – 15 September 1939)
- General der Artillerie Theodor Endres (15 September 1939 – 1 October 1942)
- Generalleutnant Hellmuth Reymann (1 October 1942 – 1 October 1943)
- Generalmajor Dr. Karl Koske (1 October 1943 – 1 May 1944)
- Generalleutnant Franz Sensfuß (1 May 1944 – 15 September 1944)

=== 212th Volksgrenadier Division ===
- Generalleutnant Franz Sensfuß (October 1944 – 1 April 1945)
- Genralmajor Max Ulich (1 April 1945 – 21 April 1945)
- Generalmajor Jobst Freiherr von Buddenbrock (21 April 1945 – 8 May 1945)

== Order of battle ==
=== 1939 ===
- 316th Infantry Regiment
- 320th Infantry Regiment
- 423rd Infantry Regiment
- 212th Artillery Regiment
- 212th Engineer Battalion
- 212th Anti-tank Detachment
- 212th Reconnaissance Detachment
- 212th Signal Detachment
- Supply Troops

=== 1943 ===
- 316th Grenadier Regiment
- 320th Grenadier Regiment
- 423rd Grenadier Regiment
- 212th Fusilier Battalion
- 212th Field Replacement Battalion
- 212th Artillery Regiment
- 212th Engineer Battalion
- 212th Panzerjäger Detachment
- 212th Signal Detachment
- Supply Troops

== See also ==
- Battle of Krasny Bor
- Battle of the Bulge
