= Battle of Berlin =

Last major offensive of the European theatre of World War II

- Part of the Eastern Front (World War II)
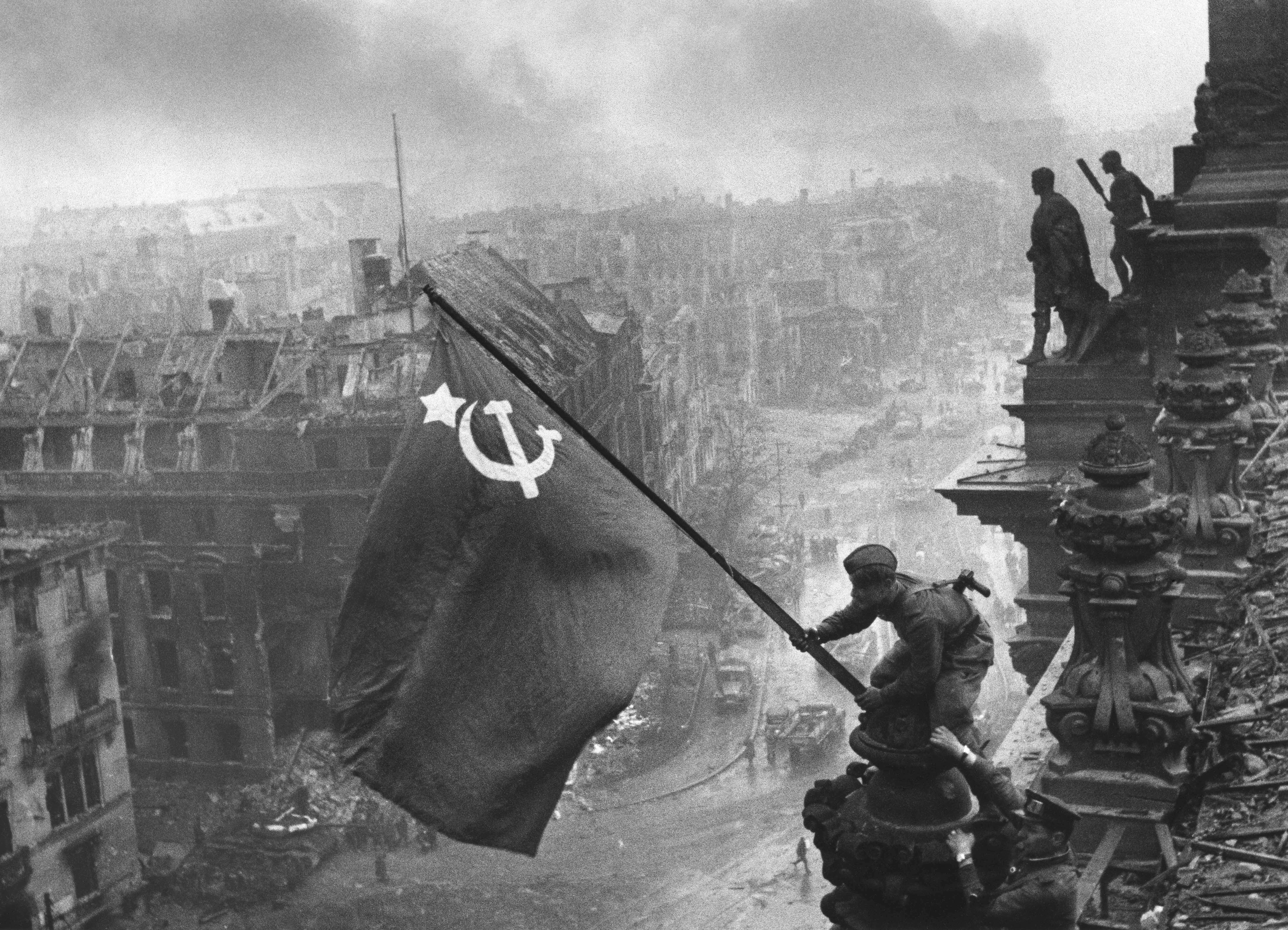
- Raising a Flag over the Reichstag (photographed by Yevgeny Khaldei)
Date	16 April – 2 May 1945 (2 weeks and 2 days)
Location	Berlin, Germany
Result	Soviet victory
Territorial changes	Expropriation of Berlin to the Soviet occupation zone in Germany

Belligerents
Soviet Union; Poland	Germany

Commanders and leaders
Joseph Stalin; Georgy Zhukov; K.K. Rokossovsky; Ivan Konev	Adolf Hitler ‡‡ (Note: Following Hitler's suicide, Joseph Goebbels succeeded him as civilian leader for approximately one day, before also committing suicide.); Gotthard Heinrici; Ferdinand Schörner; Helmuth Weidling (Note: Weidling replaced Oberstleutnant Ernst Kaether as commander of Berlin who held the post for one day having taken command from Reymann.)

Units involved
1st Belorussian Front; 2nd Belorussian Front; 1st Ukrainian Front; 1st Polish Army; 2nd Polish Army	Army Group Vistula; Army Group Centre

Strength
Total: 2,300,000 troops: 155,900–200,000 Polish People's Army; 41,600 artillery pieces; 7,500 aircraft; 6,250 tanks and SPGs; In the Berlin Defence Area: ~1,500,000 troops	Total: 766,750 troops (36 divisions): 9,303 artillery pieces (Note: Initial Soviet estimates had placed the total strength at 1 million men, but this was an overestimate(Glantz 1998, pp. 258–259)); 2,224 aircraft; 1,519 AFVs; In the Berlin Defence Area: ~45,000 troops plus Berlin Police and Hitler Youth; 40,000 Volkssturm (Note: A large number of the 45,000 were troops of the LVI Panzer Corps that were at the start of the battle part of the German 9th Army on the Seelow Heights.)

Casualties and losses
Total casualties: 361,367: 81,116 dead or missing; 280,251 sick or wounded	Total casualties: 917,000–925,000: 92,000–100,000 dead (incomplete archival data); 220,000+ wounded (Note: German estimate (Müller) based on incomplete archival data: 92,000 for Seelow, Halbe and inside Berlin; 100,000 for the Berlin area. For information about the genesis of the "Das Deutsch Reich und der Zweite Weltkrieg" project under the Military History Research Office of the Bundeswehr, refer to Ziemke 1983, pp. 398–407); 480,000 captured
- 125,000 German civilians dead

The Battle of Berlin, designated as the Berlin Strategic Offensive Operation by the Soviet Union, and also known as the Fall of Berlin, was one of the last major offensives of the European theatre of World War II. (Note: The last offensive of the European war was the Prague Offensive (6–11 May 1945) when the Red Army, with the help of Polish, Romanian and Czechoslovak forces defeated the parts of Army Group Centre which continued to resist in Czechoslovakia. There were a number of small battles and skirmishes involving small bodies of men but no other mass fighting that resulted in the death of thousands of people. (See the end of World War II in Europe for details on these final days of the war.))

After the Vistula–Oder Offensive of January–February 1945, the Red Army had temporarily halted on a line 60 km (37 mi) east of Berlin. On 9 March, Germany established its defence plan for the city with Operation Clausewitz. The first defensive preparations at the outskirts of Berlin were made on 20 March, under the newly appointed commander of Army Group Vistula, General Gotthard Heinrici.

When the Soviet offensive resumed on 16 April, two Soviet fronts (army groups) attacked Berlin from the east and south, while a third overran German forces positioned north of Berlin. Before the main battle in Berlin commenced, the Red Army encircled the city after successful battles of the Seelow Heights and Halbe. On 20 April 1945, Hitler's birthday, the 1st Belorussian Front led by Marshal Georgy Zhukov, advancing from the east and north, started shelling Berlin's city centre, while Marshal Ivan Konev's 1st Ukrainian Front broke through Army Group Centre and advanced towards the southern suburbs of Berlin. On 23 April General Helmuth Weidling assumed command of the forces within Berlin. The garrison consisted of several depleted and disorganised Army and Waffen-SS divisions, along with poorly trained Volkssturm and Hitler Youth members. Over the course of the next week, the Red Army gradually took the entire city.

On 30 April, Hitler killed himself. The city's garrison surrendered on 2 May but fighting continued to the northwest, west, and southwest of the city until the end of the war in Europe on 8 May (9 May in the Soviet Union) as some German units fought westward so that they could surrender to the Western Allies rather than to the Soviets.

== Background ==
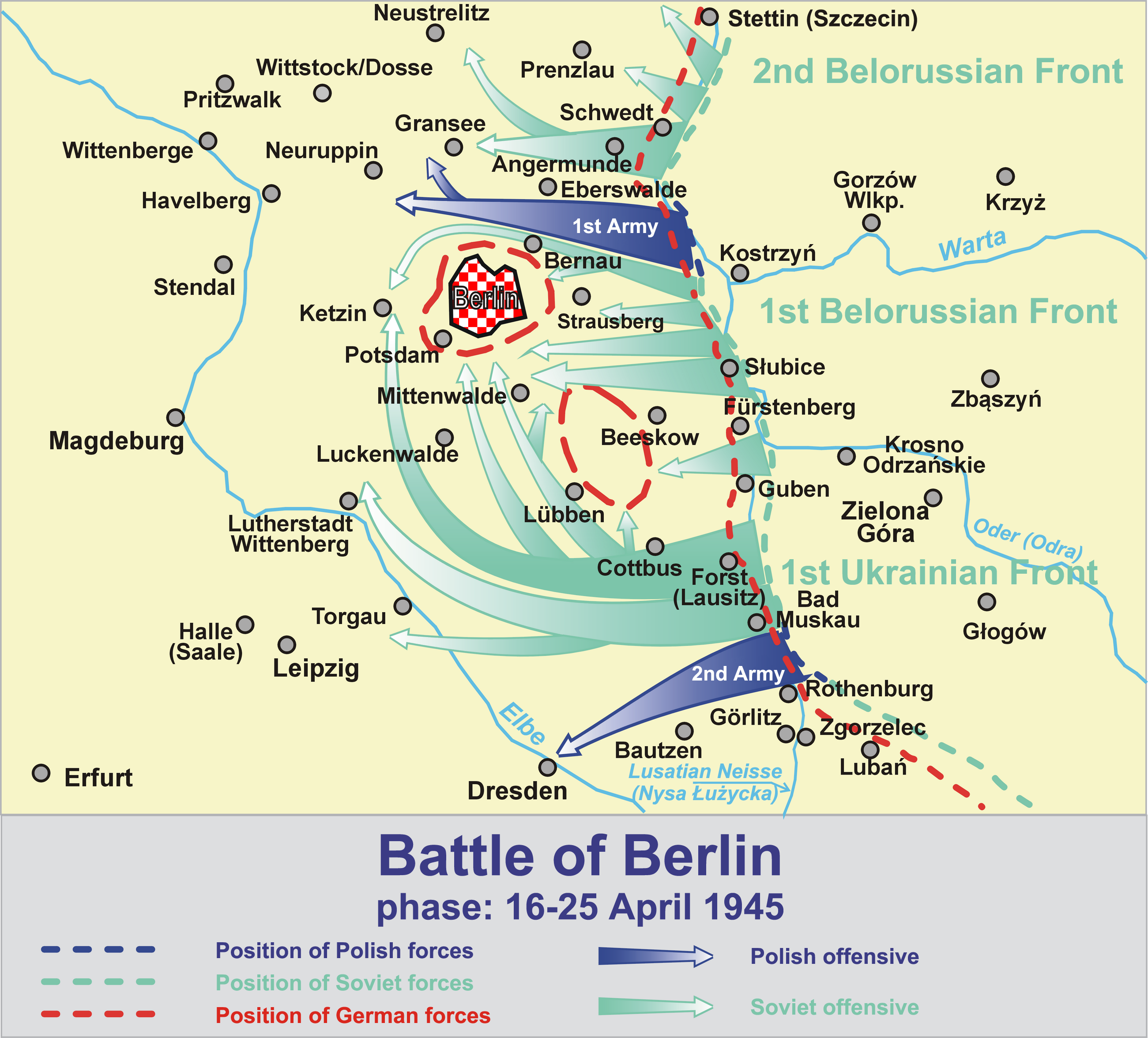
Main thrusts of the Red Army and its eastern allies

On 12 January 1945, the Red Army began the Vistula–Oder Offensive across the Narew River and from Warsaw, a three-day operation on a broad front, which incorporated four army Fronts. On the fourth day, the Red Army broke out and started moving west, up to 30 to 40 km (19 to 25 mi) per day, taking East Prussia, Danzig, and Poznań, drawing up on a line 60 km (37 mi) east of Berlin along the Oder River.

The new Army Group Vistula (Reichsführer-SS Heinrich Himmler), conducted Operation Solstice, a counter-attack, but this had failed by 24 February. The Red Army then drove on to Pomerania, clearing the right bank of the Oder River, thereby reaching into Silesia.

In the south, Soviet and Romanian forces conducted the Siege of Budapest. Three German divisions' attempts to relieve the city failed, and Budapest fell to the Soviets on 13 February. Adolf Hitler insisted on a counter-attack to recapture the Drau-Danube triangle. The goal was to secure the oil region of Nagykanizsa and regain the Danube River for future operations but the depleted German forces had been given an impossible task. By 16 March, the German Operation Spring Awakening (also the Lake Balaton Offensive) had failed, and a counter-attack by the Red Army took back in 24 hours everything the Germans had taken ten days to gain. On 30 March, the Soviets entered Austria; and in the Vienna Offensive they captured Vienna on 13 April.

On 12 April 1945, Hitler, who had earlier decided to remain in the city against the wishes of his advisers, heard the news that the American President Franklin D. Roosevelt had died. This briefly raised false hopes in the Führerbunker that there might yet be a falling out among the Allies and that Berlin would be saved at the last moment, as had happened once before when Berlin was threatened.

No plans were made by the Western Allies to seize the city. The Supreme Commander [Western] Allied Expeditionary Force, General Eisenhower, lost interest in the race to Berlin and saw no further need to suffer casualties by attacking a city that would be in the Soviet sphere of influence after the war, envisioning excessive friendly fire if both armies attempted to occupy the city at once. The main Western Allied contribution to the battle was the bombing of Berlin during 1945. During 1945 the United States Army Air Forces launched mass day raids on Berlin and for 36 nights in succession, scores of Royal Air Force (RAF) Mosquitos bombed the German capital, ending on the night of 20/21 April 1945 just before the Soviets entered the city.

== Preparations ==
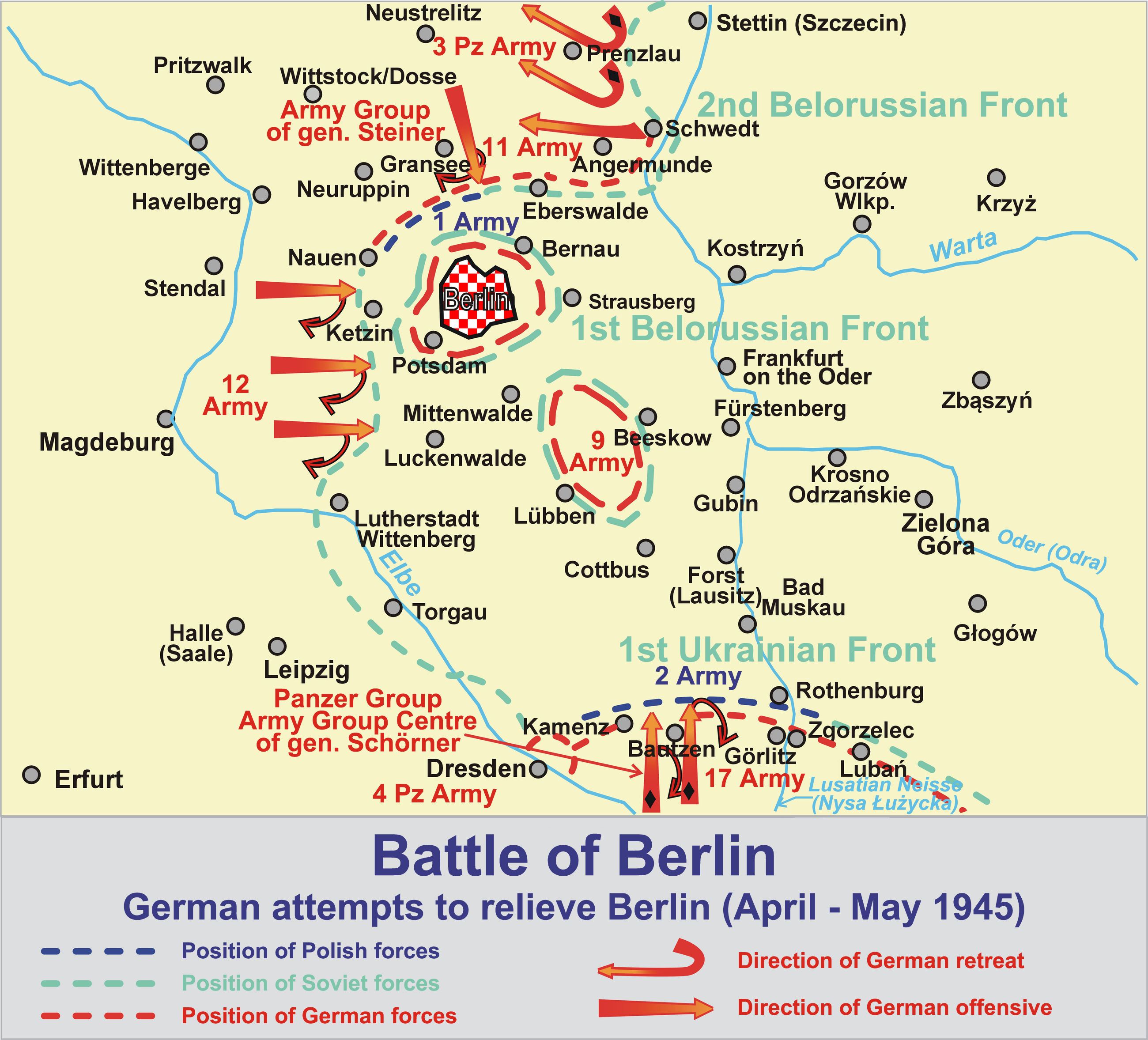
German counter-attacks

The Soviet offensive into central Germany had two objectives. Joseph Stalin, the Premier of the Soviet Union and Commander-in-Chief of its armed forces, did not believe the Western Allies would hand over territory occupied by them in the post-war Soviet zone. Thus, he launched the offensive on a broad front and moved rapidly to meet the Western Allies as far west as possible with the overriding goal of seizing Berlin first. The two goals were complementary because possession of the zone could not be won quickly unless Berlin was taken. Another factor was that Berlin itself held useful post-war strategic assets, including Adolf Hitler and the German nuclear weapons program (but unknown to the Soviet Union, by the time of the Battle of Berlin, the bulk of the uranium and most of the scientists had been evacuated to Haigerloch in the Black Forest). On 6 March, Hitler appointed Lieutenant General Helmuth Reymann commander of the Berlin Defence Area, replacing Lieutenant General Bruno Ritter von Hauenschild.

On 20 March, General Gotthard Heinrici was appointed Commander-in-Chief of Army Group Vistula, replacing Himmler. Heinrici was one of the best defensive tacticians in the German army, and he immediately started to lay defensive plans. Heinrici correctly assessed that the main Soviet thrust would be made over the Oder River and along the main east–west Autobahn. He decided not to try to defend the banks of the Oder with anything more than a light skirmishing screen. Instead, Heinrici arranged for engineers to fortify the Seelow Heights, which overlooked the Oder River at the point where the Autobahn crossed them. This was some 17 km (11 mi) west of the Oder and 90 km (56 mi) east of Berlin. Heinrici thinned out the line in other areas to increase the manpower available to defend the heights. German engineers turned the Oder's flood plain, already saturated by the spring thaw, into a swamp by releasing the water from a reservoir upstream. Behind the plain on the plateau, the engineers built three belts of defensive emplacements reaching back towards the outskirts of Berlin (the lines nearer to Berlin were called the Wotan position). These lines consisted of anti-tank ditches, anti-tank gun emplacements, and an extensive network of trenches and bunkers.

On 9 April, after a long resistance, Königsberg in East Prussia fell to the Red Army. This freed up Marshal Rokossovsky's 2nd Belorussian Front to move west to the east bank of the Oder river. Marshal Georgy Zhukov concentrated his 1st Belorussian Front, which had been deployed along the Oder river from Frankfurt (Oder) in the south to the Baltic, into an area in front of the Seelow Heights. The 2nd Belorussian Front moved into the positions being vacated by the 1st Belorussian Front north of the Seelow Heights. While this redeployment was in progress, gaps were left in the lines; and the remnants of General Dietrich von Saucken's 2nd Army, which had been bottled up in a pocket near Danzig, managed to escape into the Vistula delta. To the south, Marshal Konev shifted the main weight of the 1st Ukrainian Front out of Upper Silesia and northwest to the Neisse River.

The three Soviet fronts had altogether 2.5 million men (including 78,556 soldiers of the 1st Polish Army), 6,250 tanks, 7,500 aircraft, 41,600 artillery pieces and mortars, 3,255 truck-mounted Katyusha rocket launchers (nicknamed 'Stalin's Organ'), and 95,383 motor vehicles, many manufactured in the US.

== Opposing forces ==
=== Northern sector ===
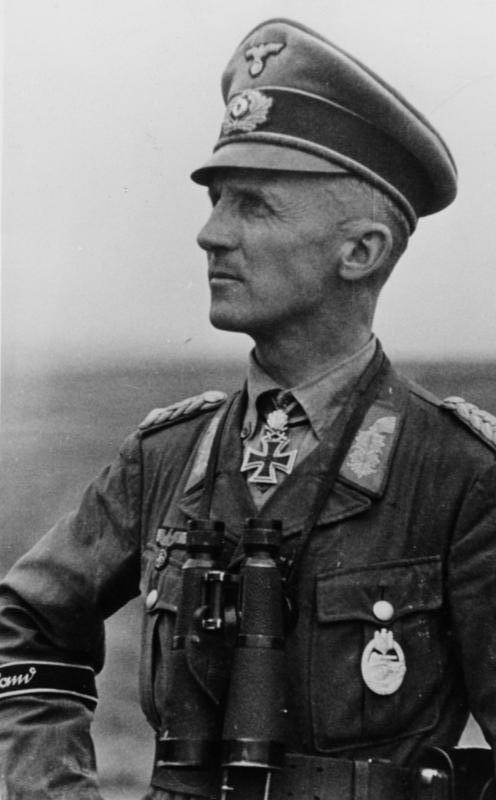
Hasso von Manteuffel

(Nazi Germany) German

3rd Panzer Army
General of Panzer Hasso von Manteuffel (Note: Politically rehabilitated after the war and served in the Bundestag.)
- 4 infantry divisions
- 3 naval divisions
- 2 volksgrenadier divisions

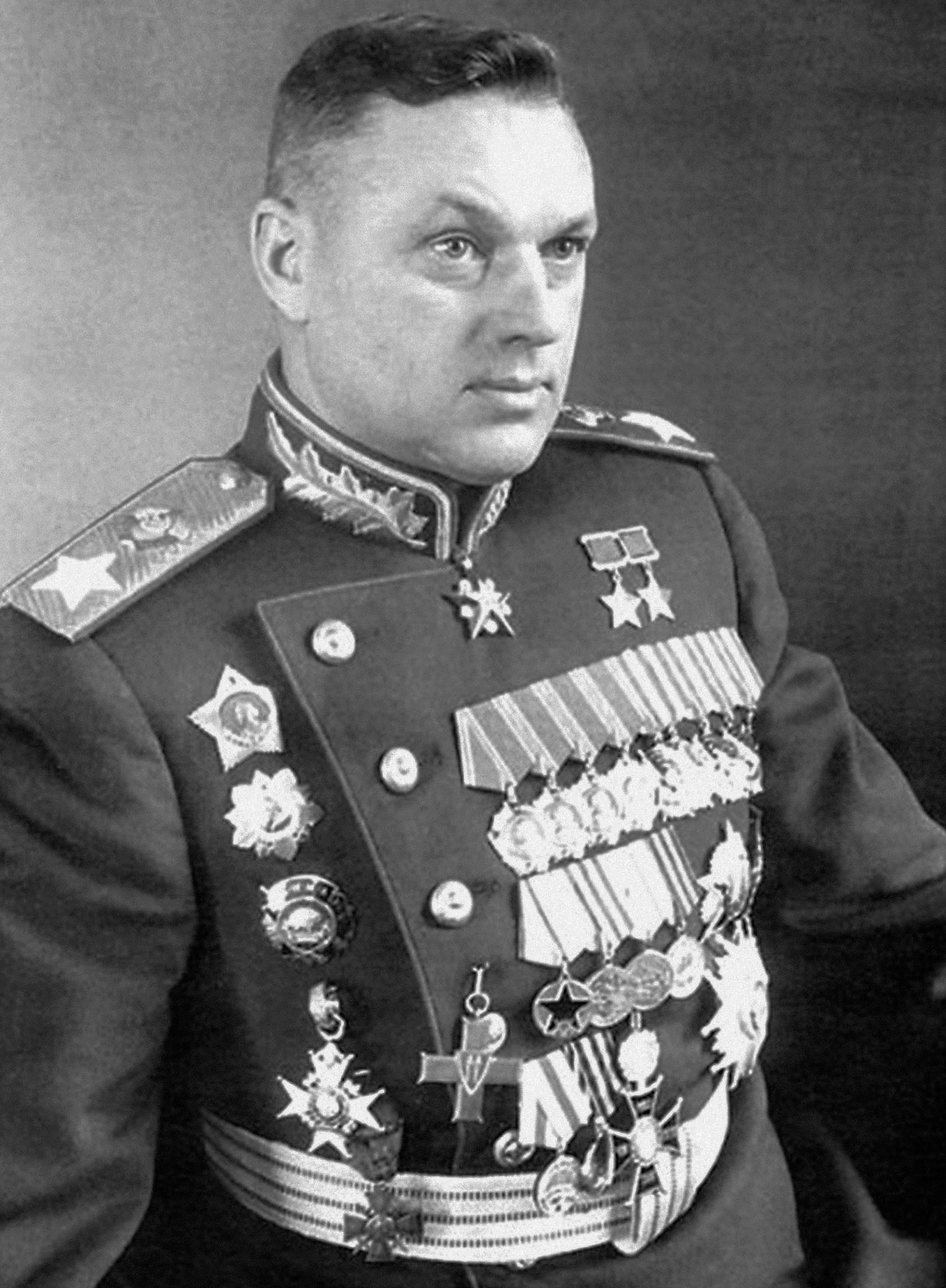
Konstantin Rokossovsky

(Soviet Union) Soviet

Second Belorussian Front
Marshal Konstantin Rokossovsky (Note: Imprisoned and tortured during the Great Purge of 1937; reinstated during the Winter War of 1939–40; later made a Marshal of the Soviet Union for his leadership during Operation Bagration.)
- 31 rifle divisions
- 7 guards rifle divisions
- 1 motorized rifle battalion
- 3 tank battalions

=== Middle sector ===
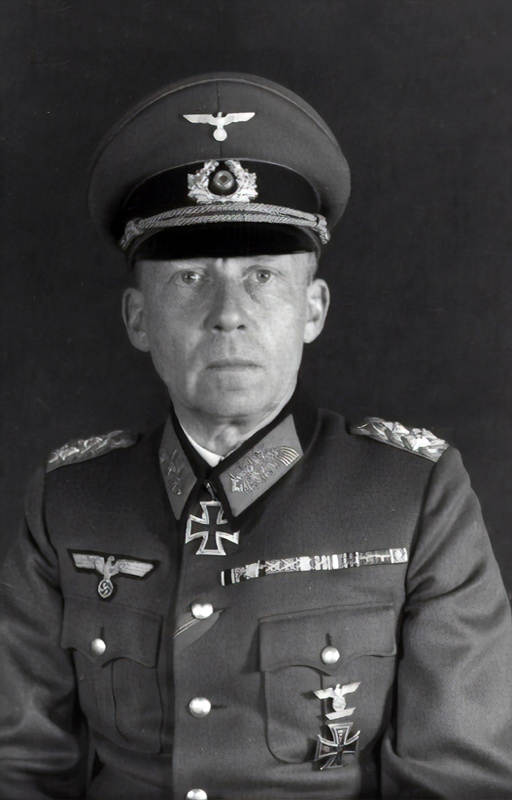
Gotthard Heinrici

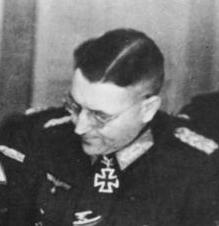
Theodor Busse

(Nazi Germany) German

Army Group Vistula
Colonel General Gotthard Heinrici (Note: After release from POW status, contributed to the assemblage of historical accounts of the war.)
- 15 infantry divisions
- 6 panzer divisions
- 2 motorized infantry divisions
9th Army
General of Infantry Theodor Busse (Note: Politically rehabilitated after the war and served as the Federal Republic of Germany's director of civil defense.)
- 5 infantry divisions
- 4 panzergrenadier divisions
- 1 panzer division
- 1 SS grenadier division
- 1 security division
- 1 Jäger division
- 1 parachute division
- 1 Kampfgruppe

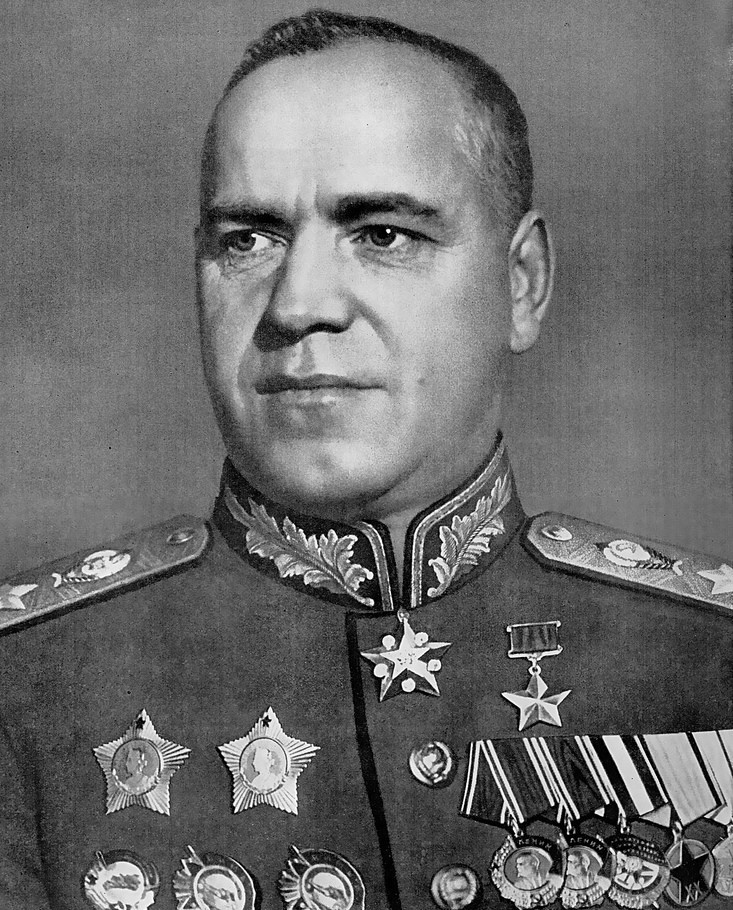
Georgy Zhukov

(Soviet Union) Soviet

First Belorussian Front
Marshal Georgy Zhukov (Note: One of the USSR's most effective and decorated leaders during the war; his popularity led a jealous Stalin to sideline him after the war.)
- 54 rifle divisions
- 16 guards rifle divisions
- 5 infantry divisions (Polish)
- 3 guards cavalry divisions
- 3 mechanized brigades
- 6 guards mechanized brigades
- 7 tank brigades
- 10 guards tank brigades
- 1 armored brigade (Polish)
- 2 motorized rifle brigades

=== Southern sector ===
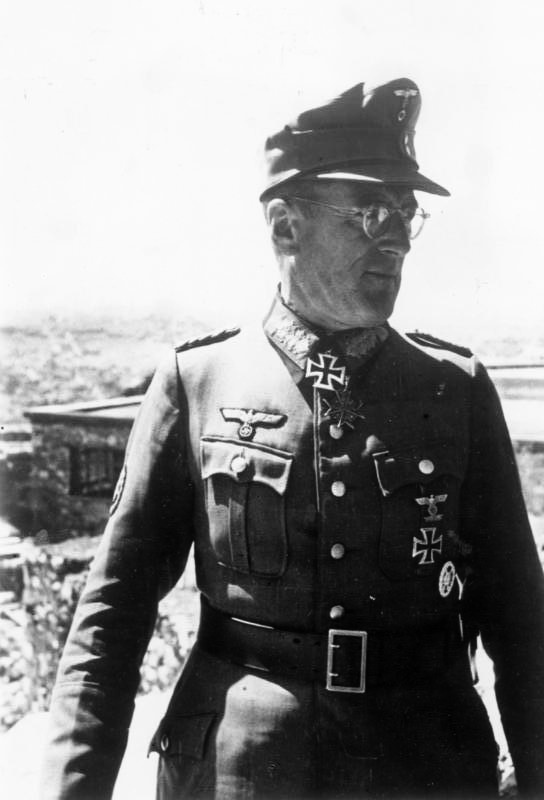
Ferdinand Schörner

(Nazi Germany) German

Army Group Centre
Feldmarshal Ferdinand Schörner (Note: Known for unrelenting brutality; ordered the immediate hanging of all deserters, even in the final days of the war; served time for war crimes in both the USSR and the Federal Republic of Germany.)
- 13 infantry divisions
- 3 panzer divisions
- 1 Reichsarbeitsdienst division
- 1 SS police division
- 1 SS grenadier division
- 1 anti-aircraft division
- 2 Kampfgruppen

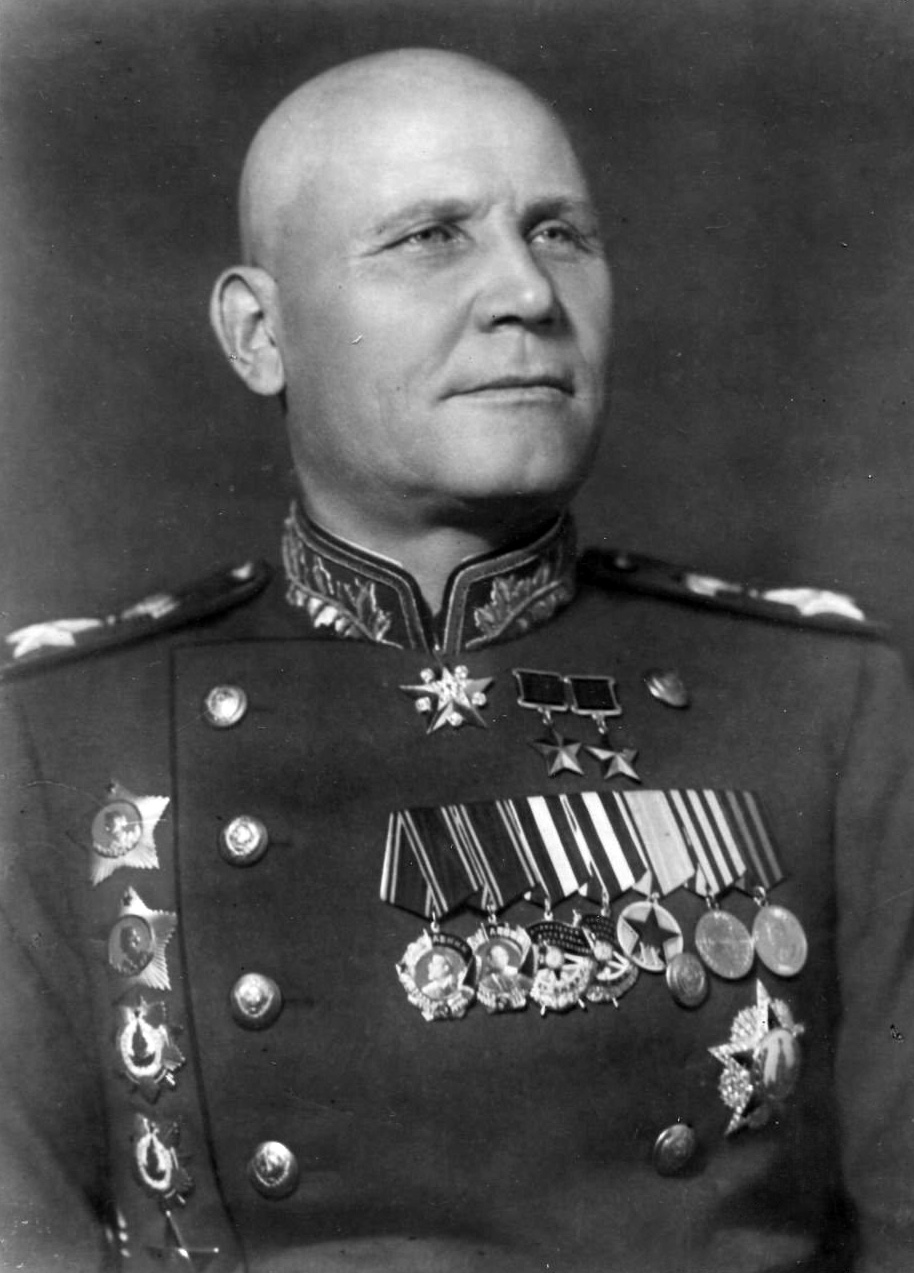
Ivan Konev

(Soviet Union) Soviet

- First Ukrainian Front

Marshal Ivan Konev (Note: Made Marshal of the Soviet Union in February 1944; following war, replaced Zhukov as commander of Soviet ground forces.)
- 26 rifle divisions
- 15 guards rifle divisions
- 5 infantry divisions (Polish)
- 3 guards cavalry divisions
- 1 guards airborne division
- 9 guards mechanized brigades
- 3 mechanized brigades
- 4 guards motorized rifle brigades
- 1 armored corps (Polish)
- 4 tank brigades
- 10 guards tank brigades
- 1 motorized rifle brigade

== Battle of the Oder–Neisse ==
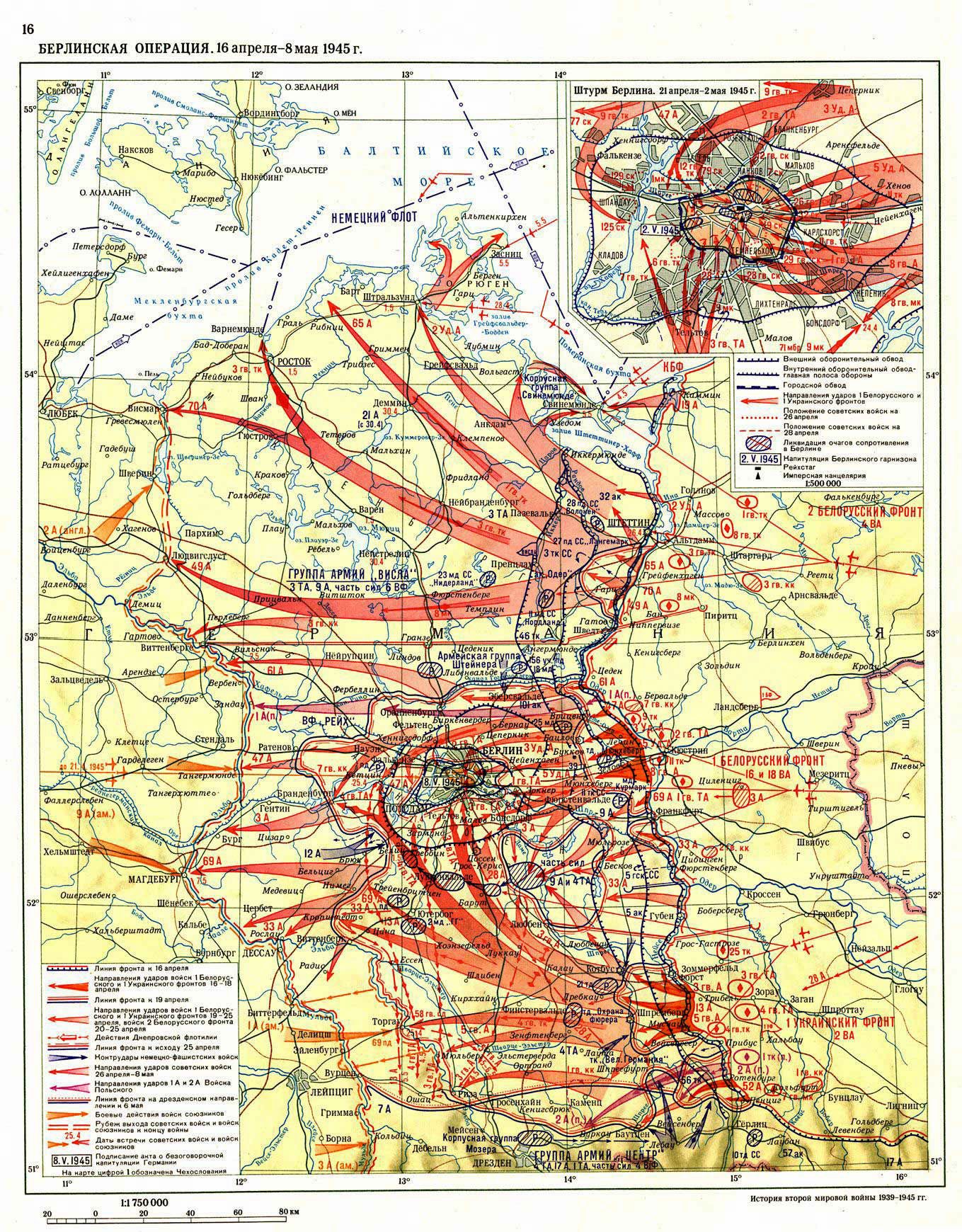
Berlin offensive

The sector in which most of the fighting in the overall offensive took place was the Seelow Heights, the last major defensive line outside Berlin. The Battle of the Seelow Heights, fought over four days from 16 until 19 April, was one of the last pitched battles of World War II: almost one million Red Army soldiers and more than 20,000 tanks and artillery pieces were deployed to break through the "Gates to Berlin", which were defended by about 100,000 German soldiers and 1,200 tanks and guns. The Soviet forces led by Zhukov broke through the defensive positions, having suffered about 30,000 dead, while 12,000 German personnel were killed.

On 19 April, the fourth day, the 1st Belorussian Front broke through the final line of the Seelow Heights and nothing but broken German formations lay between them and Berlin. The 1st Ukrainian Front, having captured Forst the day before, fanned out into open country. One powerful thrust by Gordov's 3rd Guards Army and Rybalko's 3rd and Lelyushenko's 4th Guards Tank Armies were heading north-east towards Berlin while other armies headed west towards a section of the United States Army's front line southwest of Berlin on the Elbe. With these advances, the Soviet forces drove a wedge between Army Group Vistula in the north and Army Group Centre in the south. By the end of the day, the German eastern front line north of Frankfurt around Seelow and to the south around Forst had ceased to exist. These breakthroughs allowed the two Soviet Fronts to envelop the German 9th Army in a large pocket west of Frankfurt. Attempts by the 9th Army to break out to the west resulted in the Battle of Halbe. The cost to the Soviet forces had been very high, with over 2,807 tanks lost between 1 and 19 April, including at least 727 at the Seelow Heights.

In the meantime, RAF Mosquitos conducted tactical air raids against German positions inside Berlin on the nights of 15 April (105 bombers), 17 April (61 bombers), 18 April (57 bombers), 19 April (79 bombers), and 20 April (78 bombers).

== Encirclement of Berlin ==
On 20 April 1945, Hitler's 56th birthday, Soviet artillery of the 1st Belorussian Front began shelling Berlin and did not stop until the city surrendered. The weight of ordnance delivered by Soviet artillery during the battle was greater than the total tonnage dropped by Western Allied bombers on the city. While the 1st Belorussian Front advanced towards the east and north-east of the city, the 1st Ukrainian Front pushed through the last formations of the northern wing of Army Group Centre and passed north of Juterbog, well over halfway to the American front line on the river Elbe at Magdeburg. To the north between Stettin and Schwedt, the 2nd Belorussian Front attacked the northern flank of Army Group Vistula, held by Hasso von Manteuffel's 3rd Panzer Army. The next day, Bogdanov's 2nd Guards Tank Army advanced nearly 50 km (31 mi) north of Berlin and then attacked southwest of Werneuchen. The Soviet plan was to encircle Berlin first and then envelop the 9th Army.

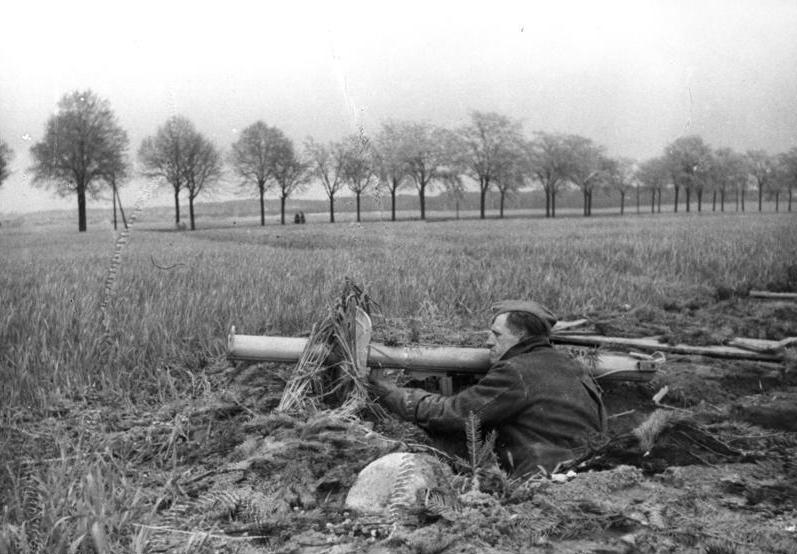
April 1945: a member of the Volkssturm, the German home defence militia, armed with a Panzerschreck, outside Berlin

The command of the German V Corps, trapped with the 9th Army north of Forst, passed from the 4th Panzer Army to the 9th Army. The corps was still holding on to the Berlin-Cottbus highway front line. Field Marshal Ferdinand Schörner's Army Group Centre launched a counter-offensive aimed at breaking through to Berlin from the south and entering (the Battle of Bautzen) in the 1st Ukrainian Front region, engaging the 2nd Polish Army and elements of the Red Army's 52nd Army and 5th Guards Army. When the old southern flank of the 4th Panzer Army had some local successes counter-attacking north against the 1st Ukrainian Front, Hitler unrealistically ordered the 9th Army to hold Cottbus and set up a front facing west. Next, they were to attack the Soviet columns advancing north to form a pincer that would meet the 4th Panzer Army coming from the south and envelop the 1st Ukrainian Front before destroying it. They were to anticipate a southward attack by the 3rd Panzer Army and be ready to be the southern arm of a pincer attack that would envelop 1st Belorussian Front, which would be destroyed by SS-General Felix Steiner's Army Detachment advancing from north of Berlin. Later in the day, when Steiner explained that he did not have the divisions to achieve this, Heinrici made it clear to Hitler's staff that unless the 9th Army retreated immediately, it would be enveloped by the Soviets. He stressed that it was already too late for it to move northwest to Berlin and would have to retreat west. Heinrici went on to say that if Hitler did not allow it to move west, he would ask to be relieved of his command.

On 22 April 1945, at his afternoon situation conference, Hitler fell into a tearful rage when he realised that his plans, prepared the previous day, could not be achieved. He declared that the war was lost, blaming the generals for the defeat and that he would remain in Berlin until the end and then kill himself.

In an attempt to coax Hitler out of his rage, General Alfred Jodl speculated that General Walther Wenck's 12th Army, which was facing the Americans, could move to Berlin because the Americans, already on the Elbe River, were unlikely to move further east. This assumption was based on his viewing of the captured Eclipse documents, which organised the partition of Germany among the Allies. Hitler immediately grasped the idea, and within hours Wenck was ordered to disengage from the Americans and move the 12th Army north-east to support Berlin. It was then realised that if the 9th Army moved west, it could link up with the 12th Army. In the evening Heinrici was given permission to make the link-up.

Elsewhere, the 2nd Belorussian Front had established a bridgehead 15 km (9 mi) deep on the west bank of the Oder and was heavily engaged with the 3rd Panzer Army. The 9th Army had lost Cottbus and was being pressed from the east. A Soviet tank spearhead was on the Havel River to the east of Berlin, and another had at one point penetrated the inner defensive ring of Berlin.

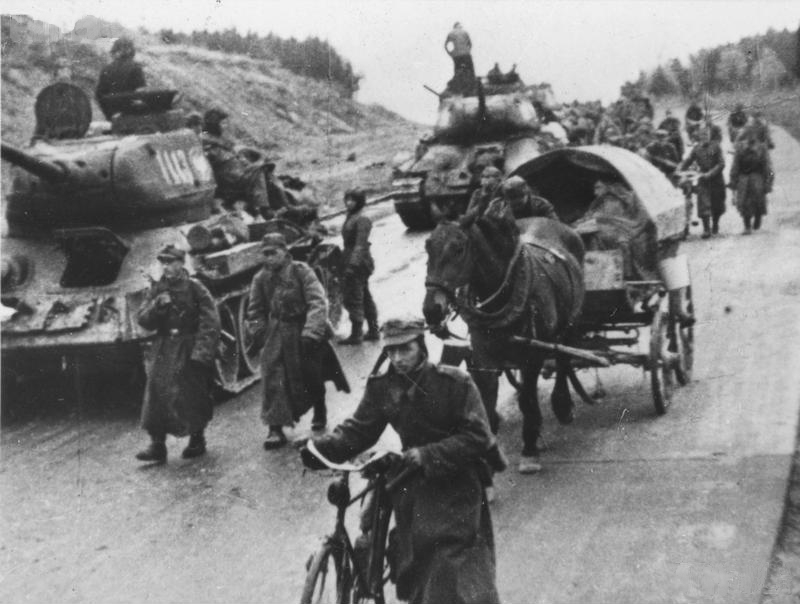
Polish Army on their way to Berlin in 1945

The capital was now within range of field artillery. A Soviet war correspondent, in the style of World War II Soviet journalism, gave the following account of an important event which took place on 22 April 1945 at 08:30 local time:

On the walls of the houses we saw Goebbels' appeals, hurriedly scrawled in white paint: 'Every German will defend his capital. We shall stop the Red hordes at the walls of our Berlin.' Just try and stop them!

Steel pillboxes, barricades, mines, traps, suicide squads with grenades clutched in their hands—all are swept aside before the tidal wave.
Drizzling rain began to fall. Near Biesdorf I saw batteries preparing to open fire.
'What are the targets?' I asked the battery commander.
'Centre of Berlin, Spree bridges, and the northern and Stettin railway stations,' he answered.
Then came the tremendous words of command: 'Open fire on the capital of Fascist Germany.'
I noted the time. It was exactly 8:30 a.m. on 22 April. Ninety-six shells fell in the centre of Berlin in the course of a few minutes.

On 23 April 1945, the Soviet 1st Belorussian Front and 1st Ukrainian Front continued to tighten the encirclement, severing the last link between the German 9th Army and the city. Elements of the 1st Ukrainian Front continued to move westward and started to engage the German 12th Army moving towards Berlin. On this same day, Hitler appointed General Helmuth Weidling as the commander of the Berlin Defence Area, replacing Lieutenant General Reymann. (Note: Beevor 2002, p. 286 states the appointment was on 23 April 1945; Hamilton 2008, p. 160 states "officially" it was the next morning of 24 April 1945; Dollinger 1967, p. 228 gives 26 April for Weidling's appointment.) Meanwhile, by 24 April 1945 elements of 1st Belorussian Front and 1st Ukrainian Front had completed the encirclement of the city. Within the next day, 25 April 1945, the Soviet investment of Berlin was consolidated, with leading Soviet units probing and penetrating the S-Bahn defensive ring. By the end of the day, it was clear that the German defence of the city could not do anything but temporarily delay the capture of the city by the Soviets, since the decisive stages of the battle had already been fought and lost by the Germans outside the city. By that time, Schörner's offensive, initially successful, had mostly been thwarted, although he did manage to inflict significant casualties on the opposing Polish and Soviet units, slowing down their progress.

== Battle in Berlin ==
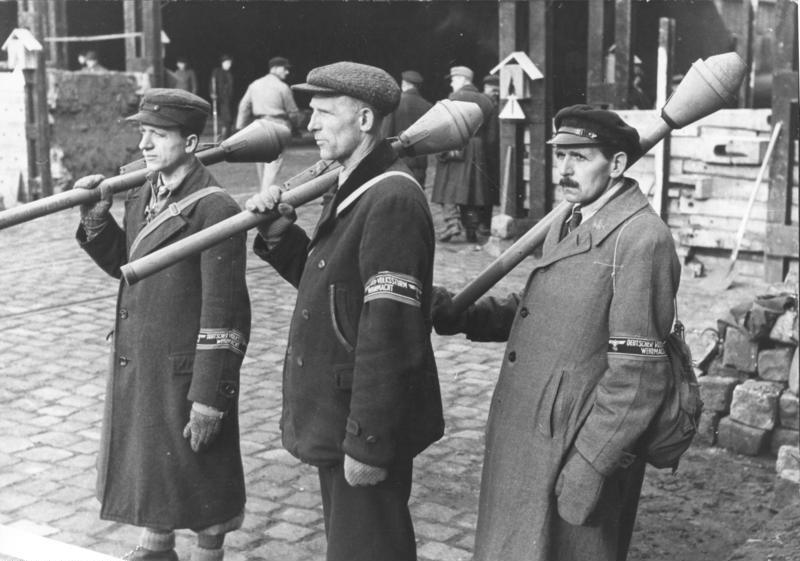
Volkssturm men armed with Panzerfausts

The forces available to General Weidling for the city's defence included roughly 45,000 soldiers in several severely depleted Heer and Waffen-SS divisions. These divisions were supplemented by the Berlin Police force, boys in the compulsory Hitlerjugend, and the Volkssturm. Many of the 40,000 elderly men of the Volkssturm had been in the army as young men and some were veterans of World War I. Hitler appointed SS-Brigadeführer Wilhelm Mohnke the Battle Commander for the central government district that included the Reich Chancellery and Führerbunker. He had over 2,000 men under his command. (Note: The Soviets later estimated the number as 180,000, but this included many unarmed men in uniform, such as railway officials and members of the Reich Labour Service.(Beevor 2002, p. 287)) Weidling organised the defences into eight sectors designated 'A' through to 'H' each one commanded by a colonel or a general, but most had no combat experience. To the west of the city was the 20th Infantry Division. To the north of the city was the 9th Parachute Division. To the north-east of the city was the Panzer Division Müncheberg. To the south-east of the city and to the east of Tempelhof Airport was the 11th SS Panzergrenadier Division Nordland. The reserve, 18th Panzergrenadier Division, was in Berlin's central district.

On 23 April, Berzarin's 5th Shock Army and Katukov's 1st Guards Tank Army assaulted Berlin from the south-east and, after overcoming a counter-attack by the German LVI Panzer Corps, reached the Berlin S-Bahn ring railway on the north side of the Teltow Canal by the evening of 24 April. During the same period, of all the German forces ordered to reinforce the inner defences of the city by Hitler, only a small contingent of French SS volunteers under the command of SS-Brigadeführer Gustav Krukenberg arrived in Berlin. During 25 April, Krukenberg was appointed as the commander of Defence Sector C, the sector under the most pressure from the Soviet assault on the city.

On 26 April, Chuikov's 8th Guards Army and the 1st Guards Tank Army fought their way through the southern suburbs and attacked Tempelhof Airport, just inside the S-Bahn defensive ring, where they met stiff resistance from the Müncheberg Division. But by 27 April, the two understrength divisions (Müncheberg and Nordland) that were defending the south-east, now facing five Soviet armies—from east to west, the 5th Shock Army, the 8th Guards Army, the 1st Guards Tank Army and Rybalko's 3rd Guards Tank Army (part of the 1st Ukrainian Front)—were forced back towards the centre, taking up new defensive positions around Hermannplatz. Krukenberg informed General Hans Krebs, Chief of the General Staff of Army high command that within 24 hours the Nordland would have to fall back to the centre sector Z (for Zentrum). (Note: Beevor 2002, p. 304, states the centre sector was known as Z for Zentrum; Fischer 2008, pp. 42–43, and Tiemann 1998, p. 336, quoting General Mohnke directly refers to the smaller centre government quarter/district in this area and under his command as Z-Zitadelle.) The Soviet advance to the city centre was along these main axes: from the south-east, along the Frankfurter Allee (ending and stopped at the Alexanderplatz); from the south along Sonnenallee ending north of the Belle-Alliance-Platz, from the south ending near the Potsdamer Platz and from the north ending near the Reichstag. The Reichstag, the Moltke bridge, Alexanderplatz, and the Havel bridges at Spandau saw the heaviest fighting, with house-to-house and hand-to-hand combat. The foreign contingents of the SS fought particularly hard, because they were ideologically motivated and they believed that they would not live if captured.

=== Battle for the Reichstag ===
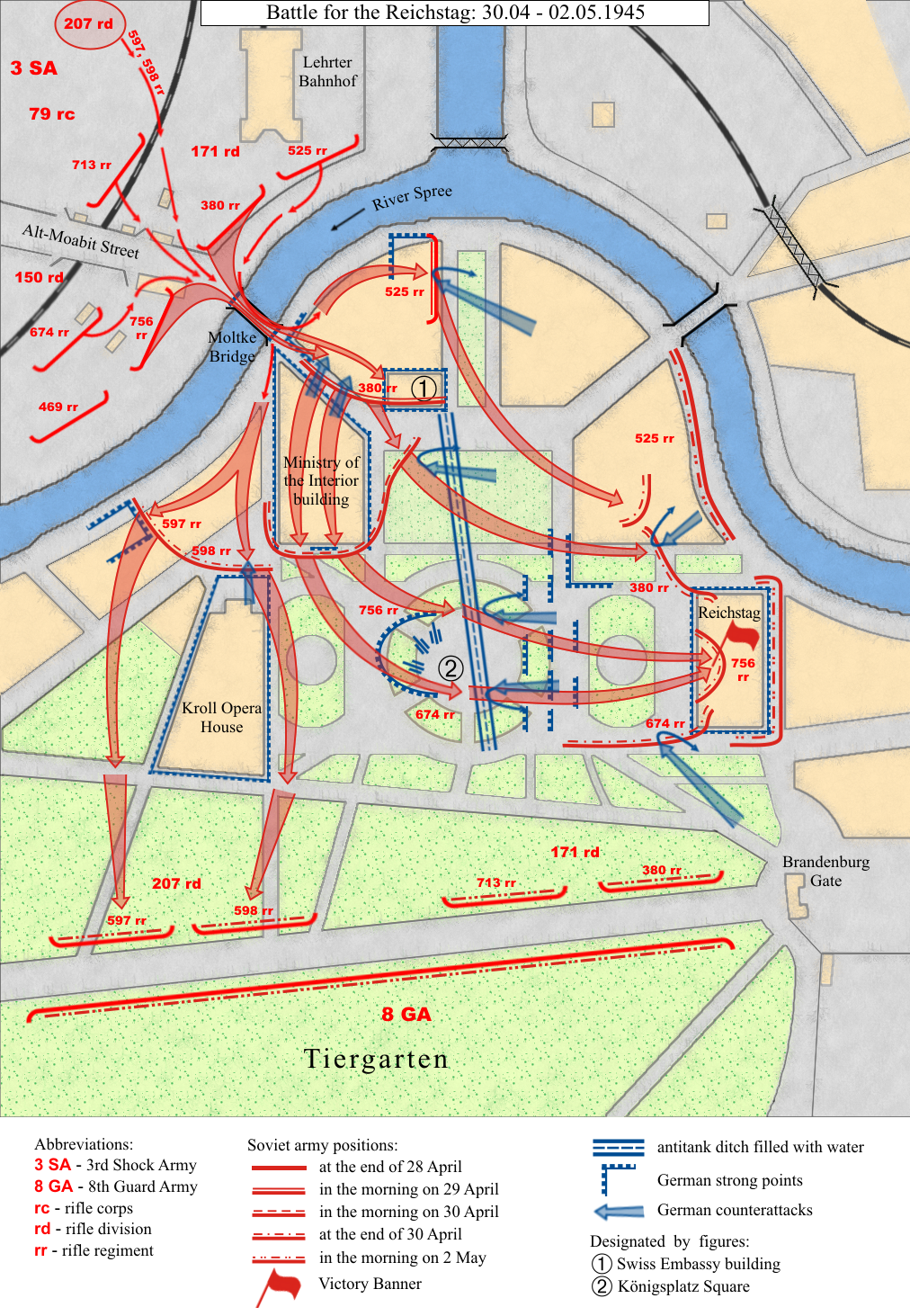
Battle for the Reichstag

In the early hours of 29 April the Soviet 3rd Shock Army crossed the Moltke Bridge and started to fan out into the surrounding streets and buildings. The initial assaults on buildings, including the Ministry of the Interior, were hampered by the lack of supporting artillery. It was not until the damaged bridges were repaired that artillery could be moved up in support. At 4 am, in the Führerbunker, Hitler signed his last will and testament and, shortly afterwards, married Eva Braun. At dawn the Soviets pressed on with their assault in the south-east. After very heavy fighting they managed to capture Gestapo headquarters on Prinz-Albrechtstrasse, but a Waffen-SS counter-attack forced the Soviets to withdraw from the building. To the southwest, the 8th Guards Army attacked north across the Landwehr canal into the Tiergarten.

While the Soviets placed great importance in its capture, the Reichstag had not been in use since it had burned in February 1933 and had been left in ruins ever since. The Germans did not regard the location as especially vital, but nonetheless deployed a substantial garrison force to defend it.

By the next day, 30 April, the Soviets had solved their bridging problems and with artillery support at 06:00 they launched an attack on the Reichstag, but because of German entrenchments and support from 12.8 cm FlaK 40 guns 2 km (1.2 mi) away on the roof of the Zoo flak tower, close by Berlin Zoo, it was not until that evening that the Soviets were able to enter the building. The German troops inside were heavily entrenched, and fierce room-to-room fighting ensued. At that point there was still a large contingent of German soldiers in the basement who launched counter-attacks against the Red Army. By 2 May 1945 the Red Army controlled the building entirely. The famous photo of the two soldiers planting the flag on the roof of the building is a re-enactment photo taken the day after the building was taken. To the Soviets the event as represented by the photo became symbolic of their victory demonstrating that the Battle of Berlin, as well as the Eastern Front hostilities as a whole, ended with the total Soviet victory. As the 756th Regiment's commander Zinchenko had stated in his order to Battalion Commander Neustroev "... the Supreme High Command ... and the entire Soviet People order you to erect the victory banner on the roof above Berlin".

=== Battle for the centre ===
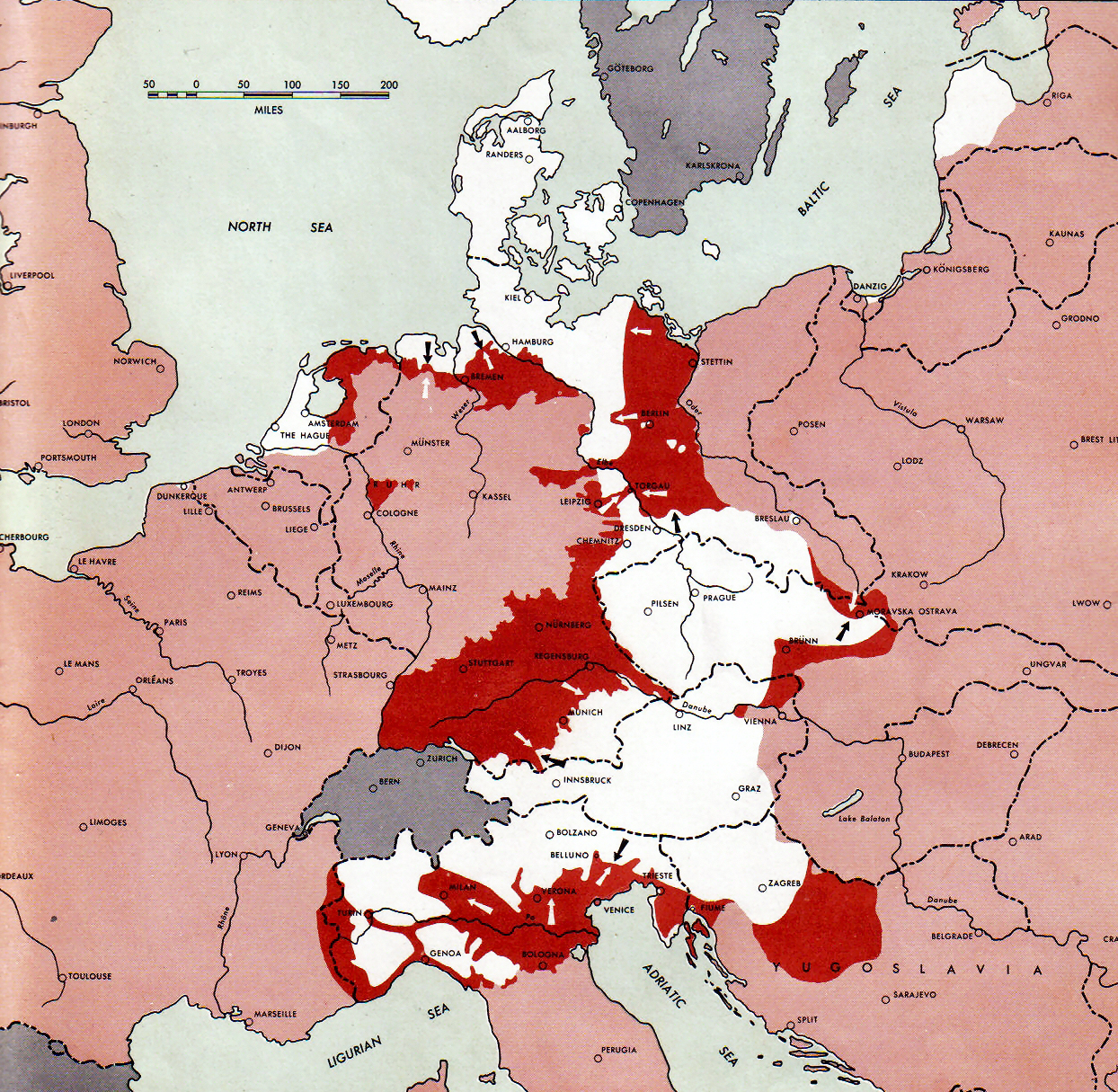
Front lines 1 May (pink = Allied occupied territory; red = area of fighting)

During the early hours of 30 April, Weidling informed Hitler in person that the defenders would probably exhaust their ammunition during the night. Hitler granted him permission to attempt a breakout through the encircling Red Army lines. That afternoon, Hitler and Braun committed suicide and their bodies were cremated not far from the bunker. In accordance with Hitler's last will and testament, Admiral Karl Dönitz became the President of the Reich (Reichspräsident) and Joseph Goebbels became the new Chancellor of the Reich (Reichskanzler).

As the perimeter shrank and the surviving defenders fell back, they became concentrated into a small area in the city centre. By now there were about 10,000 German soldiers in the city centre, which was being assaulted from all sides. One of the other main thrusts was along Wilhelmstrasse on which the Air Ministry, built of reinforced concrete, was pounded by large concentrations of Soviet artillery. The remaining German Tiger tanks of the Hermann von Salza battalion took up positions in the east of the Tiergarten to defend the centre against Kuznetsov's 3rd Shock Army (which although heavily engaged around the Reichstag was also flanking the area by advancing through the northern Tiergarten) and the 8th Guards Army advancing through the south of the Tiergarten. These Soviet forces had effectively cut the sausage-shaped area held by the Germans in half and made any escape attempt to the west for German troops in the centre much more difficult.

The first day of May saw little close quarters combat. The intensity of the fight had died down, and was instead characterized by artillery barrages and sniper fire. In many parts of Berlin, officers began sending Volkstrum and Hitler Youth members back to their homes.

During the early hours of 1 May, Krebs talked to General Vasily Chuikov, commander of the Soviet 8th Guards Army, (Note: Dollinger 1967, p. 239, states 3 am, and Beevor 2003, p. 391, 4 am, for Krebs' meeting with Chuikov.) informing him of Hitler's death and a willingness to negotiate a citywide surrender. They could not agree on terms because of Soviet insistence on unconditional surrender and Krebs' claim that he lacked authorisation to agree to that. Goebbels was against surrender. In the afternoon, Goebbels and his wife killed their children and then themselves. Goebbels's death removed the last impediment which prevented Weidling from accepting the terms of unconditional surrender of his garrison, but he chose to delay the surrender until the next morning to allow the planned breakout to take place under the cover of darkness.

=== Breakout and surrender ===
On the night of 1/2 May, most of the remnants of the Berlin garrison attempted to break out of the city centre via three directions. Only those that went west through the Tiergarten and crossed the Charlottenbrücke (a bridge over the Havel) into Spandau succeeded in breaching Soviet lines. A handful of those who survived the initial breakout made it to the lines of the Western Allies—most were either killed or captured by the Red Army's outer encirclement forces west of the city. Early in the morning of 2 May, the Soviets captured the Reich Chancellery. General Weidling surrendered with his staff at 6 am. He was taken to see General Vasily Chuikov at 08:23, where Weidling ordered the city's defenders to surrender to the Soviets. The 350-strong garrison of the Zoo flak tower left the building. There was sporadic fighting in a few isolated buildings where some SS troops still refused to surrender, but the Soviets reduced such buildings to rubble.

=== Hitler's Nero Decree ===
The city's food supplies had been largely destroyed on Hitler's orders. 128 of the 226 bridges had been blown up and 87 pumps rendered inoperative. "A quarter of the subway stations were under water, flooded on Hitler's orders. Thousands and thousands who had sought shelter in them had drowned when the SS had carried out the blowing up of the protective devices on the Landwehr Canal." A number of workers, on their own initiative, resisted or sabotaged the SS's plan to destroy the city's infrastructure; they successfully prevented the blowing up of the Klingenberg power station, the Johannisthal waterworks, and other pumping stations, railroad facilities, and bridges.

== Battle outside Berlin ==
At some point on 28 April or 29 April, General Heinrici, Commander-in-Chief of Army Group Vistula, was relieved of his command after disobeying Hitler's direct orders to hold Berlin at all costs and never order a retreat, and was replaced by General Kurt Student. General Kurt von Tippelskirch was named as Heinrici's interim replacement until Student could arrive and assume control. There remains some confusion as to who was in command, as some references say that Student was captured by the British and never arrived. Regardless of whether von Tippelskirch or Student was in command of Army Group Vistula, the rapidly deteriorating situation that the Germans faced meant that Army Group Vistula's coordination of the armies under its nominal command during the last few days of the war was of little significance.

On the evening of 29 April, Krebs contacted General Alfred Jodl (Supreme Army Command) by radio:

Request immediate report. Firstly of the whereabouts of Wenck's spearheads. Secondly of time intended to attack. Thirdly of the location of the 9th Army. Fourthly of the precise place in which the 9th Army will break through. Fifthly of the whereabouts of General Rudolf Holste's spearhead.

In the early morning of 30 April, Jodl replied to Krebs:

Firstly, Wenck's spearhead bogged down south of Schwielow Lake. Secondly, the 12th Army therefore unable to continue attack on Berlin. Thirdly, bulk of the 9th Army surrounded. Fourthly, Holste's XLI Panzer Corps on the defensive.

=== North ===
While the 1st Belorussian Front and the 1st Ukrainian Front encircled Berlin, and started the battle for the city itself, Rokossovsky's 2nd Belorussian Front started his offensive to the north of Berlin. On 20 April between Stettin and Schwedt, Rokossovsky's 2nd Belorussian Front attacked the northern flank of Army Group Vistula, held by the 3rd Panzer Army. By 22 April, the 2nd Belorussian Front had established a bridgehead on the east bank of the Oder that was over 15 km (9 mi) deep and was heavily engaged with the 3rd Panzer Army. On 25 April, the 2nd Belorussian Front broke through 3rd Panzer Army's line around the bridgehead south of Stettin, crossed the Randowbruch Swamp, and were now free to move west towards Montgomery's British 21st Army Group and north towards the Baltic port of Stralsund.

The German 3rd Panzer Army and the 21st Army situated to the north of Berlin retreated westwards under relentless pressure from Rokossovsky's 2nd Belorussian Front, and was eventually pushed into a pocket 32 km (20 mi) wide that stretched from the Elbe to the coast. To their west was the British 21st Army Group (which on 1 May broke out of its Elbe bridgehead and had raced to the coast capturing Wismar and Lübeck), to their east Rokossovsky's 2nd Belorussian Front and to the south was the United States Ninth Army which had penetrated as far east as Ludwigslust and Schwerin.

=== South ===
The successes of the 1st Ukrainian Front during the first nine days of the battle meant that by 25 April, they were occupying large swathes of the area south and southwest of Berlin. Their spearheads had met elements of the 1st Belorussian Front west of Berlin, completing the investment of the city. Meanwhile, the 58th Guards Rifle Division of the 5th Guards Army in 1st Ukrainian Front made contact with the 69th Infantry Division of the United States First Army near Torgau, on the Elbe River.

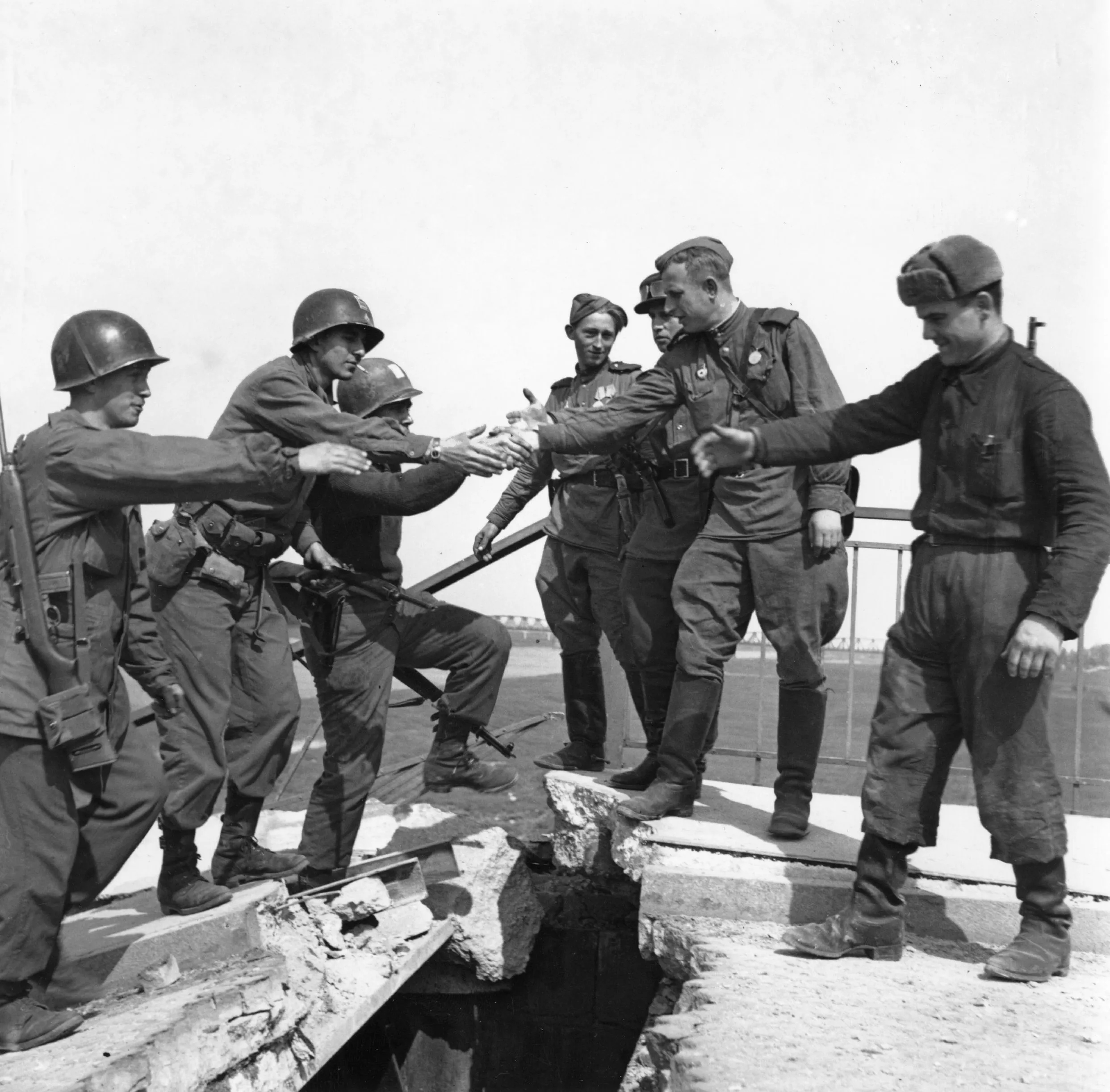
Soviet Lt. Charles Thau (center, looking into camera) behind the handshake, with U.S. PFC Bernard E. Kirschenbaum (left center), 25 April 1945

Among the 58th Guard Rifle Division participants was Lieutenant Charles Thau, the Soviet officer at the center of the widely published "East Meets West" photograph of the Elbe linkup.

These manoeuvres had broken the German forces south of Berlin into three parts. The German 9th Army was surrounded in the Halbe pocket. Wenck's 12th Army, obeying Hitler's command of 22 April, was attempting to force its way into Berlin from the southwest but met stiff resistance from 1st Ukrainian Front around Potsdam. Schörner's Army Group Centre was forced to withdraw from the Battle of Berlin, along its lines of communications towards Czechoslovakia.

Between 24 April and 1 May, the 9th Army fought a desperate action to break out of the pocket in an attempt to link up with the 12th Army. Hitler assumed that after a successful breakout from the pocket, the 9th Army could combine forces with the 12th Army and would be able to relieve Berlin. There is no evidence to suggest that Generals Heinrici, Busse, or Wenck thought that this was even remotely strategically feasible, but Hitler's agreement to allow the 9th Army to break through Soviet lines allowed many German soldiers to escape to the west and surrender to the United States Army.

At dawn on 28 April, the youth divisions Clausewitz, Scharnhorst, and Theodor Körner attacked from the southwest toward the direction of Berlin. They were part of Wenck's XX Corps and were made up of men from the officer training schools, making them some of the best units the Germans had in reserve. They covered a distance of about 24 km (15 mi), before being halted at the tip of Lake Schwielow, southwest of Potsdam and still 32 km (20 mi) from Berlin. During the night, General Wenck reported to the German Supreme Army Command in Fuerstenberg that his 12th Army had been forced back along the entire front. According to Wenck, no attack on Berlin was possible. At that point, support from the 9th Army could no longer be expected. In the meantime, about 25,000 German soldiers of the 9th Army, along with several thousand civilians, succeeded in reaching the lines of the 12th Army after breaking out of the Halbe pocket. The casualties on both sides were very high. Nearly 30,000 Germans were buried after the battle in the cemetery at Halbe. About 20,000 soldiers of the Red Army also died trying to stop the breakout; most are buried at a cemetery next to the Baruth-Zossen road. These are the known dead, but the remains of more who died in the battle are found every year, so the total of those who died will never be known. Nobody knows how many civilians died but it could have been as high as 10,000.

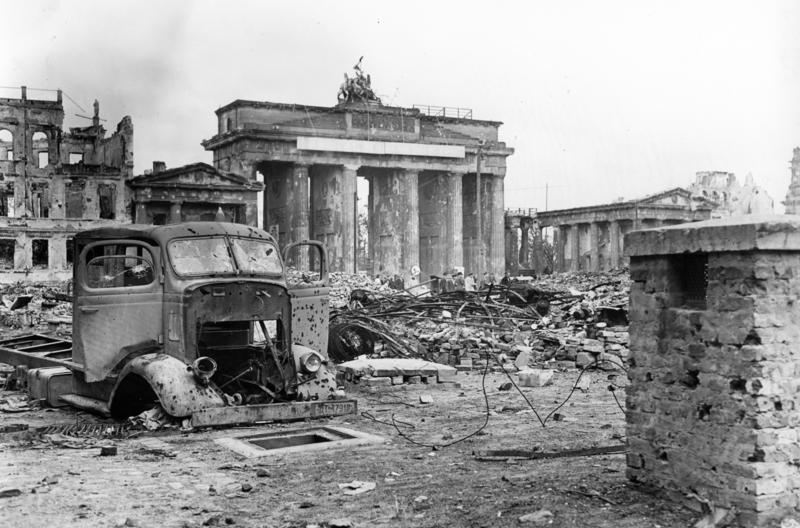
The Brandenburg Gate amid the ruins of Berlin, June 1945

Having failed to break through to Berlin, Wenck's 12th Army made a fighting retreat back towards the Elbe and American lines after providing the 9th Army survivors with surplus transport. By 6 May many German Army units and individuals had crossed the Elbe and surrendered to the US Ninth Army. Meanwhile, the 12th Army's bridgehead, with its headquarters in the park of Schönhausen, came under heavy Soviet artillery bombardment and was compressed into an area eight by two kilometres (five by one and a quarter miles).

=== Surrender ===
On the night of 2–3 May, General von Manteuffel, commander of the 3rd Panzer Army, along with General von Tippelskirch, commander of the 21st Army, surrendered to the US Army. Von Saucken's 2nd Army, which had been fighting north-east of Berlin in the Vistula Delta, surrendered to the Soviets on 9 May. On the morning of 7 May, the perimeter of the 12th Army's bridgehead began to collapse. Wenck crossed the Elbe under small arms fire that afternoon and surrendered to the American Ninth Army.

== Aftermath ==
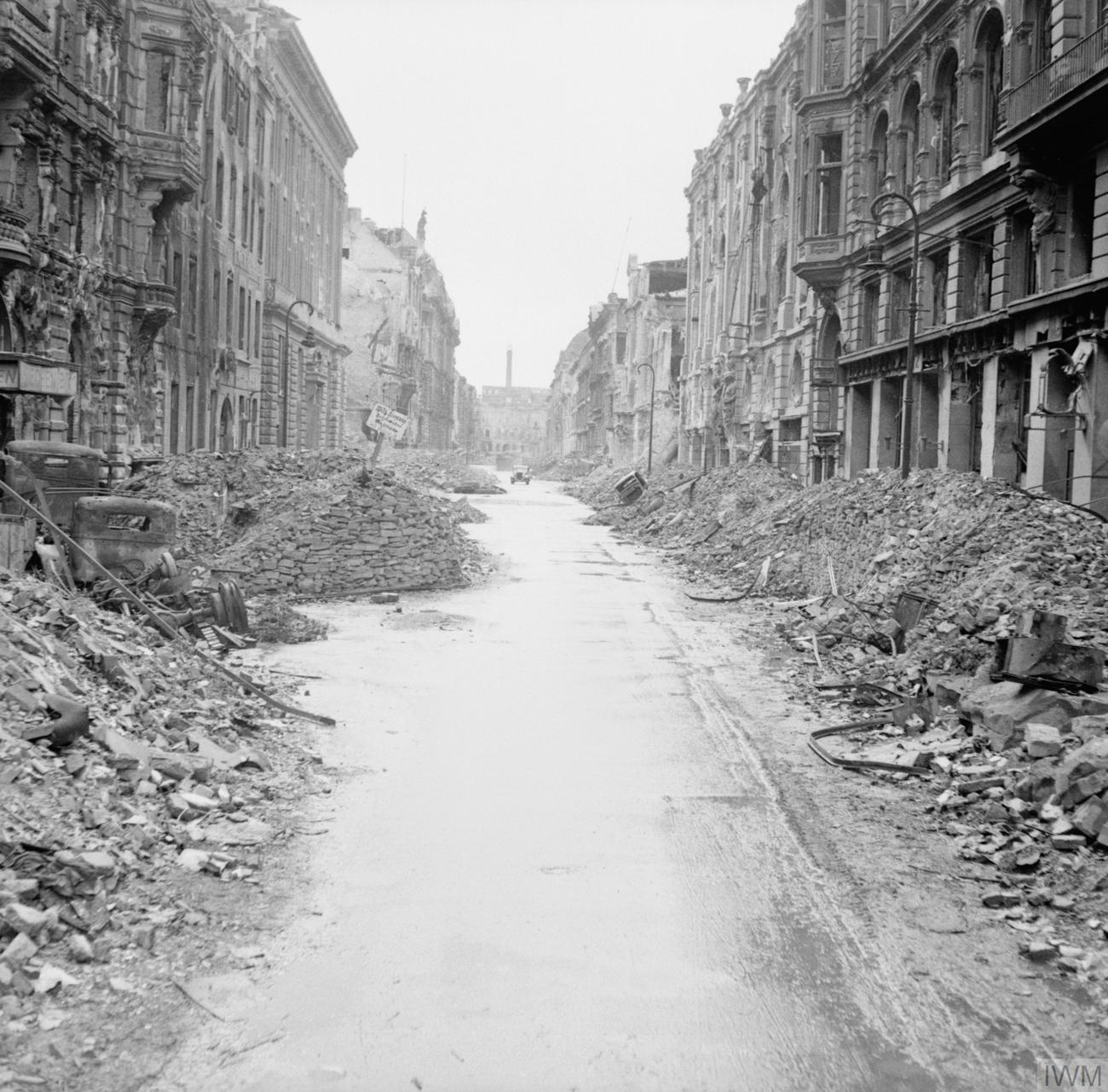
A devastated street in the city centre just off the Unter den Linden, 3 July 1945

According to Grigoriy Krivosheev, declassified archival data gives 81,116 Soviet dead for the operation, including the battles of Seelow Heights and the Halbe. Another 280,251 were reported wounded or sick. (Note: A number of sources cited in this article derive their casualty numbers from Krivosheev's archive work. They include Hamilton, who uses the figure of 361,367 without further breakdown.(Hamilton 2008, p. 372) Beevor lists the casualties as 78,291 killed and 274,184 wounded for a total of 352,475.(Beevor 2002, p. 424) Max Hastings has 352,425 Soviet casualties (1st Belorussian Front: 179,490, 2nd Belorussian Front: 59,110, 1st Ukrainian Front: 113,825) but increases the number killed to over 100,000.(Hastings 2005, p. 548)) The operation also cost the Soviets about 1,997 tanks and self-propelled guns. All losses were considered irrecoverable – i.e. beyond economic repair or no longer serviceable. The Soviets claimed to have captured nearly 480,000 German soldiers, (Note: Captured prisoners included many unarmed men in uniform, such as railway officials and members of the Reich Labour Service (Beevor 2002, p. 287).) while German research put the number of dead between 92,000 and 100,000. Some 125,000 civilians are estimated to have died during the entire operation. John Erickson says that the Battle for Berlin "cost half a million beings their lives, their well-being or their sanity." He puts Soviet casualties for the three weeks from 16 April to 8 May as 304,877 men killed, wounded and missing; plus 2,156 tanks and combat aircraft for the three Soviet fronts: 1st and 2nd Belorussian and 1st Ukrainian.

In those areas that the Red Army had captured and before the fighting in the centre of the city had stopped, the Soviet authorities took measures to start restoring essential services. Almost all transport in and out of the city had been rendered inoperative, and bombed-out sewers had contaminated the city's water supplies. The Soviet authorities appointed local Germans to head each city block, and organised the cleaning-up. The Red Army made a major effort to feed the residents of the city. Most Germans, both soldiers and civilians, were grateful to receive food issued at Red Army soup kitchens, which began on Colonel-General Berzarin's orders. After the capitulation the Soviets went house to house, arresting and imprisoning anyone in a uniform including firemen and railwaymen.

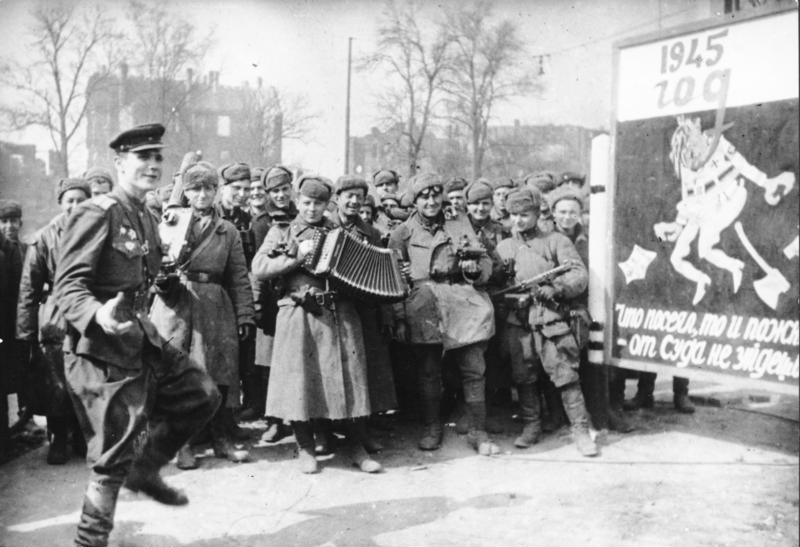
Red Army soldiers celebrating the capture of Berlin, May 1945

During and immediately following the assault, in many areas of the city, vengeful Soviet troops (often rear echelon units) engaged in mass rape, pillage, and murder. (Note: Bellamy states that most of the rapes occurred between 23 April and 8 May, after which the number of rapes gradually subsided.(Bellamy 2007, p. 670) Due to deprivations suffered by the civilian population, some women secured the necessities of life by engaging in varying degrees of coerced sex.(Ziemke 1969, pp. 149, 153) During the months preceding to the battle, as the Red Army began its offensives into Germany proper, the STAVKA recognised the potential for lapses in discipline among vengeful troops as the Red Army began offensives in the months preceding the battle, and were able to check such behaviour to a certain extent. In a 27 January order near the conclusion of the Vistula-Oder Offensive, Marshal Konev supplied a long list of commanders to be reassigned to penal battalions for looting, drunkenness and excesses against civilians.(Duffy 1991, p. 275) Although all sources agree that rapes occurred, the numbers put forward are estimates. A frequently quoted number is that 100,000 women in Berlin were raped by soldiers of the Red Army (Helke Sander & Barbara Johr: BeFreier und Befreite, Fischer, Frankfurt 2005). Russian historians, while not denying that Soviet forces committed rape, question whether the crimes were widespread (Lavrenov & Popov 2000, pp. 374–375; Rzheshevsky 2002; Gareev 2005).) Oleg Budnitskii, historian at the Higher School of Economics in Moscow, told a BBC Radio programme that Red Army soldiers were astounded when they reached Germany. "For the first time in their lives, eight million Soviet people came abroad, the Soviet Union was a closed country. All they knew about foreign countries was there was unemployment, starvation and exploitation. And when they came to Europe they saw something very different from Stalinist Russia ... especially Germany. They were really furious, they could not understand why being so rich, Germans came to Russia". Nikolai Berzarin, commander of the Red Army in Berlin, introduced penalties up to the death penalty for looting and rape.

Despite Soviet efforts to supply food and rebuild the city, starvation remained a problem. In June 1945, one month after the surrender, the average Berliner was getting only 64 percent of a daily ration of 1,240 Cal (5,200 kJ). Across the city over a million people were without homes.

== Commemoration ==
All told, 402 Red Army personnel were bestowed the USSR's highest degree of distinction, the title Hero of the Soviet Union (HSU), for their valor in Berlin's immediate suburbs and in the city itself. Marshals of the Soviet Union Zhukov and Konev received their third and second HSU awards respectively, for their roles in the battle's outcome. Combat medic Guards Senior Sergeant Lyudmila S. Kravets, was the Battle of Berlin's only female HSU recipient for her valorous actions while serving in 1st Rifle Battalion, 63rd Guards Rifle Regiment, 23rd Guards Rifle Division (subordinate to 3rd Shock Army). Additionally, 280 Red Army enlisted personnel earned the Soviet Order of Glory First Class and attained status as Full Cavaliers of the Order of Glory for their heroism during the Battle of Berlin. In Soviet society, Full Cavaliers of the Order of Glory were accorded the same rights and privileges as Heroes of the Soviet Union.

Some 1.1 million Soviet personnel who took part in the capture of Berlin from 22 April to 2 May 1945 were awarded the Medal "For the Capture of Berlin".

The design of the Victory Banner for celebrations of the Soviet Victory Day was defined by a federal law of Russia on 7 May 2007.

Poland's official Flag Day is held each year on 2 May, the last day of the battle in Berlin, when the Polish Army hoisted its flag on the Berlin Victory Column.

== See also ==
- German Instrument of Surrender and Berlin Declaration (1945)
- German World War II strongholds
- Medal for Participation in the Battle of Berlin
- Mikhail Minin
- Panzerbär
- Prague Offensive
- Siege of Breslau
- Soviet Union in World War II
- Soviet war crimes
- Stunde Null
- Charles Thau

== Sources ==
- Antill, Peter (2005), Berlin 1945, Osprey, ISBN 978-1-84176-915-8
- Beevor, Antony (1 May 2002), "They raped every German female from eight to 80", The Guardian, archived from the original on 5 October 2008
- Beevor, Antony (2002), Berlin: The Downfall 1945, Viking-Penguin Books, ISBN 978-0-670-03041-5
- Beevor, Antony (2003), Berlin: The Downfall 1945, Penguin Books, ISBN 978-0-14-028696-0
- Beevor, Antony (2012), The Second World War, Weidenfeld & Nicolson, ISBN 978-0-316-02374-0
- Bellamy, Chris (2007), Absolute war: Soviet Russia in the Second World War, Alfred A. Knopf, ISBN 978-0-375-41086-4
- Bergstrom, Christer (2007), Bagration to Berlin – The Final Air Battles in the East: 1944–1945, Ian Allan, ISBN 978-1-903223-91-8
- Budnitskii, Oleg (3 May 2015), "Interview", The Rape of Berlin (broadcast), by Ash, Lucy, BBC Radio 4
- Bullock, Alan (1962), Hitler: A Study in Tyranny, Penguin Books, LCCN 63005065
- Clodfelter, Micheal (2002), Warfare and Armed Conflicts: A Statistical Reference to Casualty and Other Figures, 1500–2000 (2nd ed.), McFarland & Company, ISBN 978-0-7864-1204-4
- Dollinger, Hans (1967) [1965], The Decline and Fall of Nazi Germany and Imperial Japan, New York: Bonanza Books, ISBN 978-0-517-01313-7
- Duffy, Christopher (1991), Red Storm on the Reich, Routledge, ISBN 978-0-415-03589-7
- Empric, Bruce E. (2017), Onward to Berlin!: Red Army Valor in World War II – The Full Cavaliers of the Soviet Order of Glory, Teufelsberg Press, ISBN 978-1-973498-60-5
- Empric, Bruce E. (2019), Storming the Beast's Lair: Red Army Valor in the Battle of Berlin, Teufelsberg Press, ISBN 978-1-71097-069-2
- Engelmann, Bernt (1986), Berlin – Eine Stadt wie keine andere [Berlin – A City Like No Other] (in German), München: Bertelsmann Verlag, ISBN 9783570014158
- Erickson, John (1989) [1983], The Road to Berlin, Stalin's War with Germany, Volume 2, Yale University Press, ISBN 0-300-07813-7
- Fischer, Thomas (2008), Soldiers of the Leibstandarte, J.J. Fedorowicz Publishing, ISBN 978-0-921991-91-5
- Gareev, Makhmut; Tretiak, Ivan; Rzheshevsky, Oleg (21 July 2005), "Насилие над фактами" [Abuse of Facts], Trud (in Russian), interviewed by Sergey Turchenko
- Getty Images (Hulton Archive) (6 April 2014), "US & Russian Troops (Torgau, 26 April 1945)"
- Glantz, David M. (1998), When Titans Clashed: How the Red Army Stopped Hitler, University Press of Kansas, ISBN 978-0-7006-0899-7
- Glantz, David M. (11 October 2001), The Soviet-German War 1941–1945: Myths and Realities: A Survey Essay, The Strom Thurmond Institute, archived from the original on 18 February 2015
- Gregory, Don A.; Gehlen, William R. (2009), Two Soldiers, Two Lost Fronts: German War Diaries of the Stalingrad and North Africa Campaigns (illustrated ed.), Casemate Publishers, pp. 207, 208, ISBN 978-1-935149-05-7
- Grossmann, Atina (2009), Jews, Germans, and Allies: Close Encounters in Occupied Germany, Princeton University Press, ISBN 978-0-691-14317-0
- Hamilton, A. Stephan (2008), Bloody Streets: The Soviet Assault on Berlin, April 1945, Helion & Co., ISBN 978-1-906033-12-5
- Hastings, Max (2004), Armageddon: The Battle for Germany, 1944–1945, Macmillan, ISBN 978-0-333-90836-5
- Hastings, Max (2005), Armageddon: The Battle for Germany, 1944–1945, Pan, ISBN 978-0-330-49062-7
- Ketchum, M. (6 December 2014), The WW2 Letters of Private Melvin W. Johnson, KetchCetera, archived from the original on 3 October 2018
- Komorowski, Krzysztof (2009), "Boje polskie 1939–1945: przewodnik encyklopedyczny", Wojskowe Biuro Badań Historycznych, Poland: Bellona, pp. 65–67, ISBN 978-83-7399-353-2, archived from the original on 3 August 2021
- Krivosheev, G. F. (1997), Soviet Casualties and Combat Losses in the Twentieth Century, Greenhill Books, ISBN 978-1-85367-280-4
- Kutylowski, Denny (21 November 2011), Polish Holidays, Polish Toledo, archived from the original on 15 September 2019
- Lavrenov, Sergei; Popov, Igor (2000), Крах Третьего рейха [The Fall of the Third Reich] (in Russian), Moscow: ACT, ISBN 5-237-05065-4
- Le Tissier, Tony (2005), Slaughter at Halbe, Sutton, ISBN 978-0-7509-3689-7
- Lewis, John E. (1998), The Mammoth Book of Eye-witness History, Pgw, ISBN 978-0-7867-0534-4
- McInnis, Edgar (1946), The war, vol. 6, Oxford University Press
- Milward, Alan S. (1980), War, Economy and Society, 1939–1945, University of California Press, ISBN 978-0-520-03942-1
- Müller, Rolf-Dieter (2008), Das Deutsche Reich und der Zweite Weltkrieg, Band 10/1: Der Zusammenbruch des Deutschen Reiches 1945 und die Folgen des Zweiten Weltkrieges – Teilbd 1: Die militärische Niederwerfung der Wehrmacht (in German), Deutsche Verlags-Anstalt, ISBN 978-3-421-06237-6
- Murray, Williamson; Millett, Allan Reed (2000), A War to be Won, Harvard University Press, ISBN 978-0-674-00680-5
- RAF History – Bomber Command 60th Anniversary, RAF, 13 March 2006, archived from the original on 28 July 2012
- Федеральный закон Российской Федерации от 7 мая 2007 г. N 68-ФЗ "О Знамени Победы" (Federal Law of the Russian Federation dated May 7, 2007 N 68 -FZ "On the Banner of Victory") (in Russian), rg.ru, 8 May 2007, archived from the original on 19 May 2011
- Ryan, Cornelius (1966), The Last Battle, Simon & Schuster, ISBN 978-0-671-40640-0
- Rzheshevsky, Oleg A. (2002), Берлинская операция 1945 г.: дискуссия продолжается [The Berlin Operation of 1945: Discussion Continues], Мир истории [World of History] (in Russian) (4)
- Simons, Gerald (1982), Victory in Europe, Time-Life Books, ISBN 978-0-8094-3406-0
- Sontheimer, Michael (7 May 2008), "Iconic Red Army Reichstag Photo Faked", Der Spiegel, archived from the original on 13 September 2008
- Tiemann, Ralf (1998), The Leibstandarte IV/2, J.J. Fedorowicz Publishing, ISBN 978-0-921991-40-3
- Wagner, Ray (1974), The Soviet Air Force in World War II: the Official History, Doubleday
- White, Osmar (2003), Conquerors' Road: An Eyewitness Report of Germany 1945, Cambridge University Press, ISBN 978-0-521-53751-3
- Williams, Andrew (2005), D-Day to Berlin, Hodder, ISBN 978-0-340-83397-1
- Wilms, Carolin (24 April 2015), "Spirit of the Elbe", Dayton Daily News
- Zaloga, Steven J. (1982), 'The Polish Army, 1939–45, Osprey Publishing
- Ziemke, Earl F. (1969), Battle for Berlin End of the Third Reich Ballantine's Illustrated History of World War II (Battle Book #6), Ballantine Books
- Ziemke, Earl F. (1983), "Germany and World War II: The Official History?", Central European History, 16 (4): 398–407, doi:10.1017/S0008938900001266, S2CID 146414907
- Ziemke, Earl F. (1990), "Chapter 17 Zone and Sector", The U.S. Army in the occupation of Germany 1944–1946, Washington, D. C.: Center of Military History, United States Army, Library of Congress Catalog Card Number 75-619027, archived from the original on 3 April 2019
- Zuljan, Ralph (1 July 2003), Battle for the Seelow Heights – Part II, archived from the original on 25 May 2011 – Originally published in "World War II" at Suite101.com on 1 May 1999. Revised edition published in "Articles On War" at OnWar.com on 1 July 2003
