= Fedor Zinchenko =

Soviet officer (1902–1991)

- Born: September 19, 1902; Stavskovo, Tomsk Governorate, Russian Empire
- Died: October 15, 1991 (aged 89); Cherkasy, Ukraine
- Military career
- Allegiance: Soviet Union (1924–1950)
- Service years: 1924–1950
- Rank: Colonel
- Commands: 756th Infantry Regiment
- Conflicts: World War II
- Awards: Hero of the Soviet Union; Order of Lenin; Order of the Red Banner (2); Order of Suvorov, 3rd Class; Order of Kutuzov, 3rd Class; Order of the Patriotic War, 1st Class; Order of the Red Star

Fedor Matveevich Zinchenko (Russian: Фёдор Матвеевич Зинченко; 19 September 1902 – 15 October 1991) was a Soviet officer who commanded the 150th Rifle Division's 756th Regiment during the Storming of the Reichstag. The soldiers under his command raised the Victory Banner.

== Biography ==
=== Early life ===
Born in Tomsk Governorate to a peasant family of Ukrainian ethnicity, Zinchenko joined the Red Army at 1924, becoming a member of the Communist Party two years later. On 1930, he graduated from the Vladivostok Infantry School. He was appointed military commissar for the Leningrad Military Communications School. When Germany invaded the Soviet Union, the school was evacuated to Bashkiria. Zinchenko was appointed staff commissar of the 171st Rifle Division in November 1941. The unit was sent to the front at early 1942. In May 1944, after completing infantry officers' training, he was assigned to command the 756th Regiment, with which he fought in the Baltics and in Berlin.

=== Battle of Berlin ===
On 22 April 1945, the Regiment - as part of the 3rd Shock Army - reached the German capital. At the same day, the flag which would become the Victory Banner was handed to its commanders. After heavy combat in the streets, the Regiment's soldiers crossed the Spree in the direction of the Reichstag.

On 30 April 1945, shortly before 10:00, Zinchenko ordered his intelligence officer, Captain Kondrashev, to select two scouts who will carry the Banner. Few minutes later, the entire scouts platoon appeared, each begging to perform the task. After some prodding from the Colonel, Kondrashev selected Yegorov and Kantaria. On 12:00, a massive artillery strike hit the Reichstag. Then, the 150th and 171st Divisions' soldiers attacked. After a bitter fight inside the building, and after several other Victory Banners were placed and destroyed, Kantaria and Yegorov - together with the 756 Regiment's 1st Battalion deputy commander for political affairs, Lieutenant Alexei Berest - hoisted their flag on the Reichstag's roof roughly at 03:00, 1 May 1945, attaching it to Wilhelm I's equestrian statue.

=== Later years ===
After the war, Zinchenko was awarded the title Hero of the Soviet Union on 31 May. All his three brothers died in battle. He retired from the army at 1950, and lived to see the collapse of the Soviet Union, which was officially disbanded shortly after his death.

== Honours and awards ==
- Medal "Gold Star" Hero of the Soviet Union No. 7385
- Order of Lenin
- Order of the Red Banner, twice
- Order of Suvorov, 3rd class
- Order of Kutuzov, 3rd class
- Order of the Patriotic War, 1st class
- Order of the Red Star

== Bibliography ==
- Герои штурма рейхстага (Heroes of storm of the Reichstag), Fedor Zinchenko, Voenizdat Press, 1983.
- Путь к рейхстагу (The Path to the Reichstag), Stepan Neustroev, Sverdlovsk, 1986.
