= Franz Sensfuß =

- Born: 21 June 1891
- Died: 11 March 1976 (aged 84)
- Military career
- Allegiance: German Empire; Weimar Republic; Nazi Germany
- Branch: German Army
- Service years: 1910–1945
- Rank: Generalleutnant
- Commands: 21st Infantry Division; 212th Infantry Division
- Conflicts: World War I World War II
- Awards: Knight's Cross of the Iron Cross

Franz Heinrich Otto Sensfuß (21 June 1891 – 11 March 1976) was a German general during World War II. He was a recipient of the Knight's Cross of the Iron Cross on Nazi Germany.

== Awards and decorations ==
- Iron Cross (1914) 2nd Class (18 September 1914) & 1st Class (20 November 1914)
- Clasp to the Iron Cross (1939) 2nd Class (1 October 1939) & 1st Class (22 April 1941)
- Knight's Cross of the Iron Cross with Oak Leaves
  - Knight's Cross on 22 August 1944 as Generalleutnant and commander of the 212. Infantrie-Division

Towards the end of the war, Sensfuß was nominated for the Oak Leaves; the nomination was received by the Heerespersonalamt (HPA—Army Staff Office) from the troop on 14 March 1945. Major Joachim Domaschk requested by teleprinter message the advisory opinion from the Commander-in-Chief of AOK 1 and Heeresgruppe B. The 212. Volksgrenadier-Division at the time was being encircled by US forces in the vicinity of Baumholder and went into captivity. Major Domaschk had sent a radio message to the nominating commander of the LXXX. Armeekorps: "Nomination deferred according to AHA 44 Ziff. 572." Domaschk noted on the nomination: "Deferred, because missing in action!" A presentation was never made. Sensfuß is not listed in the book for the "nominations for the higher grades of the Knight's Cross of the Iron Cross" nor in the nomination book for Knight's Cross (starting with Nr. 5100).

Military offices
Preceded by Generalleutnant Gerhard Matzky	Commander of 21. Infanterie-Division; 1 March 1944 –28 March 1944	Succeeded by Generalleutnant Hermann Foertsch
Preceded by Generalmajor Karl Koske	Commander of 212. Infanterie-Division; 1 May 1944 – 15 September 1944	Succeeded by: 212. Volksgrenadier-Division
Preceded by: 212. Infanterie-Division	Commander of 212. Volksgrenadier-Division; October 1944 – 1 April 1945	Succeeded by Genralmajor Max Ulich
