= Consdorf =

Consdorf Konsdref (Luxembourgish)
- Commune
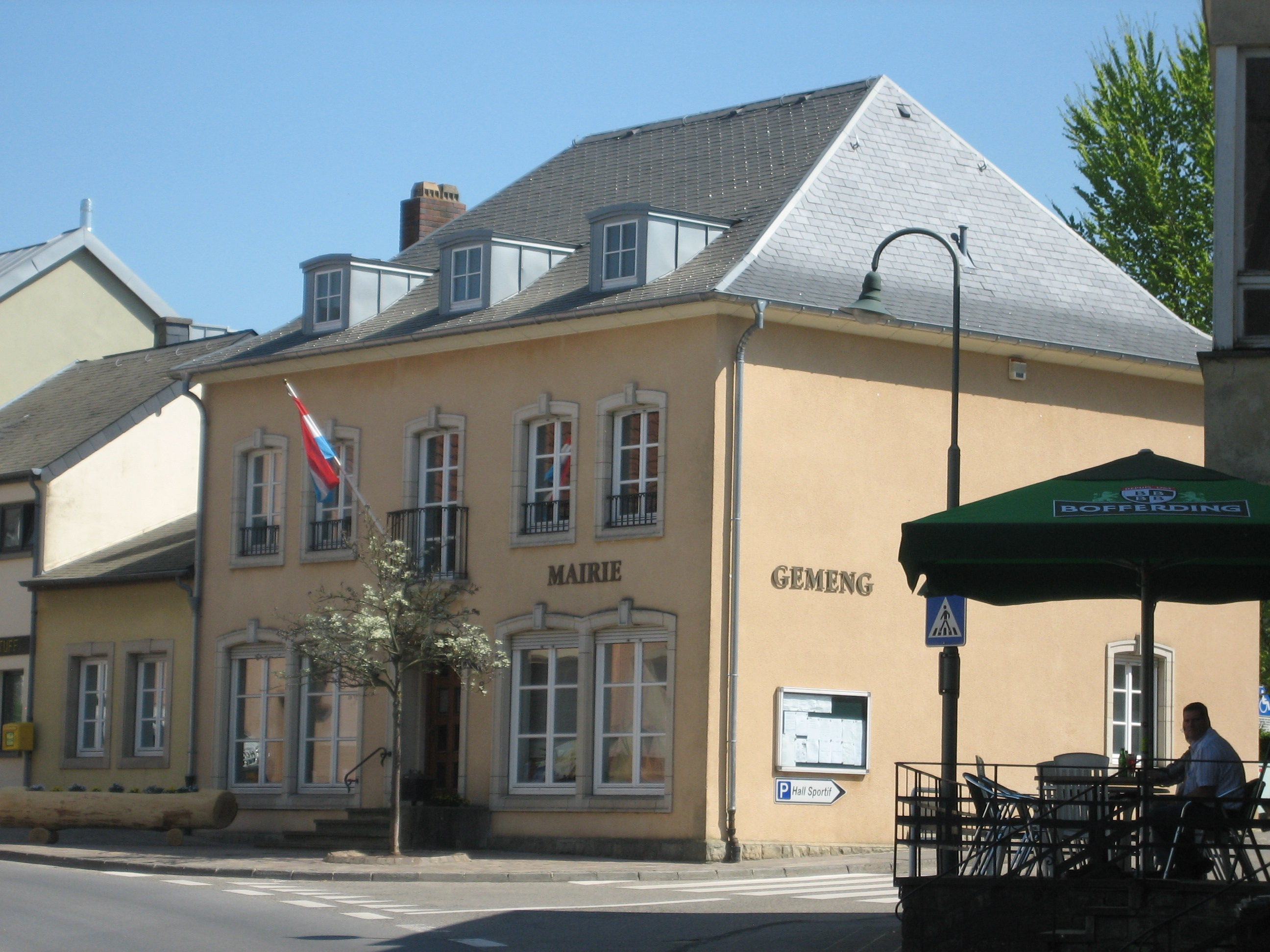
- Town hall

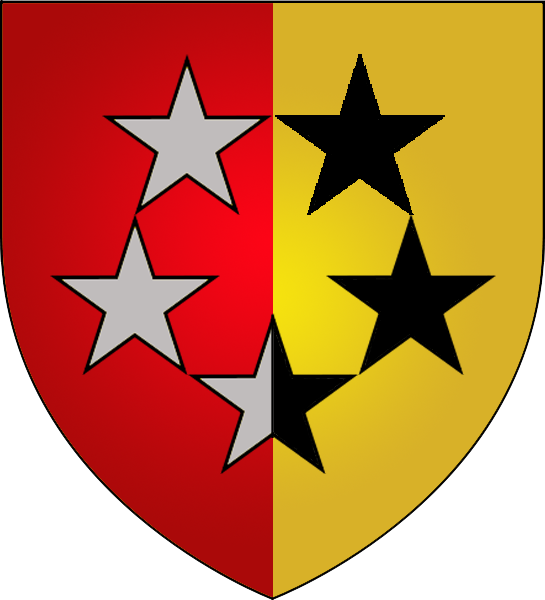
- Coat of arms

- Map of Luxembourg with Consdorf highlighted in orange, and the canton in dark red
- Coordinates: 49.7792°N 6.3375°E
- Country: Luxembourg
- Canton: Echternach

Government
  - Mayor: Marco Bermes (Independent)

Area
  - Total: 25.72 km^{2} (9.93 sq mi)
  - Rank: 35th of 100
- Highest elevation: 393 m (1,289 ft)
  - Rank: 56th of 100
- Lowest elevation: 219 m (719 ft)
  - Rank: 35th of 100

Population (2025)
  - Total: 2,108
  - Rank: 82nd of 100
  - Density: 81.96/km^{2} (212.3/sq mi)
  - Rank: 77th of 100
- Time zone: UTC+1 (CET)
  - Summer (DST): UTC+2 (CEST)
- LAU 2: LU0001004
- Website: consdorf.lu

Consdorf (German pronunciation: [ˈkɔnsˌdɔʁf]; Luxembourgish: Konsdref) is a commune and town in eastern Luxembourg. It is part of the canton of Echternach, which is part of the district of Grevenmacher.

As of September 2026, the town of Consdorf, which lies in the centre of the commune, has a population of 1,381. Other towns within the commune include Scheidgen, Wolper and Breidweiler.

== Population ==
Historical population

Year	Pop.	±%
1821	1,449	—
1851	2,165	+49.4%
1900	1,510	−30.3%
1910	1,336	−11.5%
1922	1,217	−8.9%
1935	1,205	−1.0%

Year	Pop.	±%
1947	1,129	−6.3%
1960	1,039	−8.0%
1970	1,056	+1.6%
1981	1,194	+13.1%
1990	1,424	+19.3%
2000	1,649	+15.8%

Year	Pop.	±%
2005	1,759	+6.7%
2010	1,803	+2.5%
2015	1,883	+4.4%
2020	2,101	+11.6%
2021	2,123	+1.0%

Source data
