= Ernst Kaether =

German general (1903–1999)

- Born: 25 September 1903; Aachen, Germany
- Died: 11 August 1999 (aged 95); Puchheim, Germany
- Military career
- Allegiance: Nazi Germany
- Branch: Army
- Unit: 78th Infantry Division
- Conflicts: World War II: Battle of Berlin
- Awards: Knight's Cross of the Iron Cross

Ernst Kaether (25 September 1903 – 11 August 1999) was a German officer, who rose to the rank of general in the Wehrmacht during World War II.

On 22 April 1945, Kaether briefly replaced General Hellmuth Reymann as commander of the Berlin Defence Area and for the defense of the city of Berlin. Kaether was personally promoted to Generalleutnant by Adolf Hitler for this command. However, Kaether never actually took command of Berlin's defenses for the Battle of Berlin. Before Kaether could take command, Hitler cancelled his promotions, and Kaether was replaced by General Helmuth Weidling, commander of the understrength LVI Panzer Corps. For a brief period between Kaether and Weidling, Hitler himself took personal command of the Berlin defences. Another newly promoted Generalmajor, Erich Bärenfänger, was Hitler's "deputy" commander of the Berlin Defense Area during the brief period.

== Awards ==
- Knight's Cross of the Iron Cross on 10 December 1942 as Oberstleutnant and commander of Infanterie-Regiment 14

Military offices
Preceded by Hellmuth Reymann	Commanders of the Berlin Defense Area (Nominally); 22 April 1945	Succeeded by Erich Bärenfänger
