= 13th Luftwaffe Field Division =

- 12. Luftwaffen-Feld-Division
- Active: 1942 – 1944
- Country: Nazi Germany
- Branch: Luftwaffe
- Type: Infantry
- Size: Division
- Engagements: World War II; Eastern Front; Siege of Leningrad; Third Battle of Lake Ladoga; Leningrad–Novgorod offensive

The 13th Luftwaffe Field Division (German: 13. Luftwaffen-Feld-Division) was an infantry division of the Luftwaffe branch of the German Wehrmacht that fought in World War II.

== History ==
The 13th Luftwaffe Field Division was formed on 15 November 1942 at the Fallingbostel Training Area (near Neubiburg) using the personnel of 'Flieger-Regiment 13'. The core of the division was formed around six 'Jäger' battalions split into two regiments. In early 1943, the division was transferred to Army Group North on the Eastern Front and assigned to the 18th Army. The division took over a position section on the Volkhov River in the area of Chudovo–Dymno–Spasskaya Polist. It took part in the Third Battle of Lake Ladoga. Whilst not at the centre of the fighting, and South of the Kirishi Bridgehead and Pogoste Pocket. The Division held its positions on the river line throughout 1943.

On 1 November 1943, the division was taken over by the Wehrmacht and renamed Field Division 13 (L). In January 1944, the division was struck by the major Soviet Leningrad–Novgorod offensive. In heavy rearguard action, it had to retreat to the Luga sector and from here further to the Pskow area. After a temporary deployment on the southern edge of Lake Pskov, the division moved to the area south of Ostrov.

At the end of March 1944 the division fought on the Opochka–Pskow railway line, and suffered so many casualties that it was dissolved on 1 April 1944. What remained of the Division was incorporated into the Felddivision 12 (L).

== Commanders ==
- Generalleutnant Herbert Olbrich, (November 1942 - 25 January 1943)
- Generalmajor Hans Korte, (25 January 1943 - 1 October 1943)
- Generalleutnant Hellmuth Reymann, (1 October 1943 - 1 April 1944)
