= Theodor Endres =

German general (1876–1956)

- Born: 25 September 1876; Ansbach
- Died: 18 January 1956 (aged 79); Traunstein
- Military career
- Allegiance: German Empire; Weimar Republic; Nazi Germany
- Branch: German Army
- Service years: 1897–1943
- Rank: General der Artillerie
- Commands: 212th Infantry Division
- Conflicts: World War I; World War II; Battle of France; Operation Barbarossa; Siege of Leningrad
- Awards: Knight's Cross of the Iron Cross

Theodor Endres (25 September 1876 – 18 January 1956) was a German general during World War II. He was a recipient of the Knight's Cross of the Iron Cross of Nazi Germany. Endres retired from active service on 31 January 1943.

== Awards and decorations ==
- Knight's Cross of the Iron Cross on 13 July 1940 as Generalleutnant zur Verfügung and commander of 212. Infanterie-Division

Military offices
Preceded by Generalmajor Walter Friedrichs	Commander of 212. Infanterie-Division; 15 September 1939 – 1 October 1942	Succeeded by Generalleutnant Hellmuth Reymann
