= Karl Koske =

- Born: 27 June 1889
- Died: 8 April 1945 (aged 55); Vienna
- Military career
- Allegiance: Austria–Hungary; First Austrian Republic; Nazi Germany
- Branch: German Army
- Service years: 1908–1945
- Rank: Generalmajor
- Commands: 212th Infantry Division
- Conflicts: World War I; World War II; Invasion of Poland; Battle of France; Operation Barbarossa; Siege of Leningrad
- Awards: Knight's Cross of the Iron Cross

Karl Koske (27 June 1889 – 8 April 1945) was a German general during World War II. He was a recipient of the Knight's Cross of the Iron Cross of Nazi Germany. Koske was wounded in an air raid and died in a Vienna hospital on 8 April 1945.

== Awards and decorations ==
- Knight's Cross of the Iron Cross on 15 March 1944 as Generalmajor and commander of 212. Infanterie-Division

Military offices
Preceded by Generalleutnant Hellmuth Reymann	Commander of 212. Infanterie-Division; 1 October 1943 – 1 May 1944	Succeeded by Generalleutnant Franz Sensfuß
