= Max Ulich =

Nazi general (1896–1964)

- Born: 25 March 1896; Berlin
- Died: 27 May 1964 (aged 68); Pullach
- Military career
- Allegiance: Nazi Germany
- Branch: German Army
- Service years: 1914–1945
- Rank: Generalmajor
- Commands: 212 Volksgrenadier Division
- Conflicts: World War I World War II
- Awards: Knight's Cross of the Iron Cross

Max Ulich (25 March 1896 – 27 May 1964) was a German general during World War II who commanded the 212 Volksgrenadier-Division. He was a recipient of the Knight's Cross of the Iron Cross of Nazi Germany.

== Awards and decorations ==
- Iron Cross (1939) 2nd Class & 1st Class
- German Cross in Gold (8 June 1942)
- Knight's Cross of the Iron Cross on 2 November 1943 as Oberst and commander of Grenadier-Regiment 15

Military offices
Preceded by Generalleutnant Franz Sensfuß	Commander of 212. Volksgrenadier-Division; 1 April 1945 – 21 April 1945	Succeeded by Generalmajor Jobst Freiherr von Buddenbrock
