= Hellmuth Reymann =

German general (1892–1988)

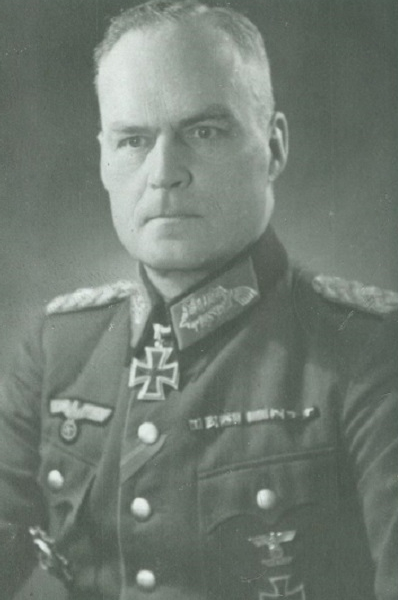
- Born: 24 November 1892; Neustadt, German Empire
- Died: 8 December 1988 (aged 96); Garmisch-Partenkirchen, Bavaria, Germany
- Military career
- Allegiance: German Empire; Weimar Republic; Nazi Germany
- Branch: German Army
- Service years: 1912–1945
- Rank: Generalleutnant
- Commands: 212th Infantry Division; 13th Luftwaffe Field Division; 11th Infantry Division
- Conflicts: World War I World War II
- Awards: Knight's Cross of the Iron Cross with Oak Leaves

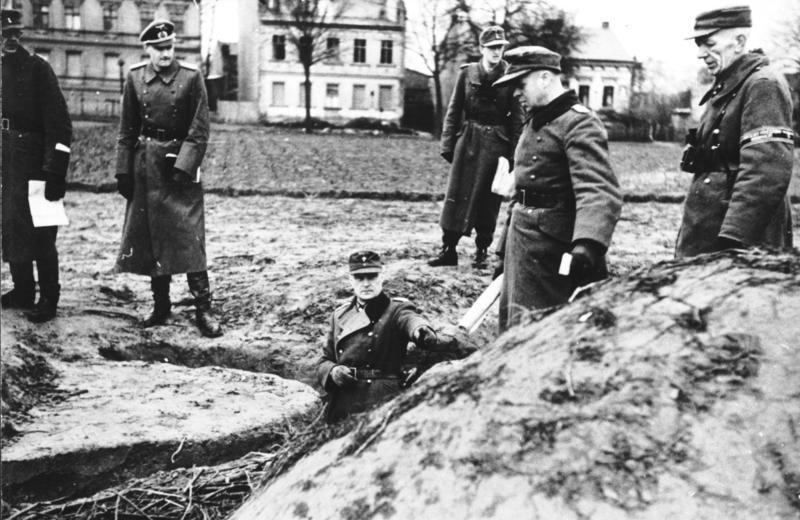
Hellmuth Reymann inspecting positions of Volkssturm in Berlin

Hellmuth Reymann (24 November 1892 – 8 December 1988) was an officer in the German Army (Heer) during World War II. He was one of the last commanders of the Berlin Defence Area during the final assault by Soviet forces on Berlin.

== World War II ==
From 1 October 1942 to 1 October 1943, Reymann commanded the 212th Infantry Division as part of Army Group North. From 1 October 1943 to 1 April 1944, he commanded the 13th Air Force Field Division. Reymann's division suffered heavy losses in the retreat from Leningrad and was disbanded in April 1944. From 1 April 1944 to 18 November 1944, Reymann commanded the 11th Infantry Division. In October 1944, Reymann's division was encircled in the Courland Pocket and he was replaced by General Gerhard Feyerabend.

=== Berlin, 1945 ===
In March 1945, Reymann was appointed commander of the Berlin Defence Area and replaced General Bruno Ritter von Hauenschild. When he entered Berlin, Reymann found that he had inherited almost nothing from von Hauenschild. Reymann realised that Adolf Hitler and Joseph Goebbels had ruled that any defeatist talk would lead to immediate execution. No plans were drawn up to evacuate the civilian population, which remained in the city.

By 21 April, Goebbels, as Reich Commissioner for Berlin, ordered that "no man capable of bearing arms may leave Berlin". Only Reymann, as commander of the Berlin Defence Area, could issue an exemption. Senior Nazi Party officials, who readily condemned members of the army for retreating, rushed to Reymann's headquarters for the necessary authorisations to leave. Reymann was happy to sign over 2,000 passes to get rid of the "armchair warriors". Reymann's chief-of-staff, Hans Refior, commented, "The rats are leaving the sinking ship".

Both Wilhelm Burgdorf and Goebbels convinced Hitler that Reymann should be relieved of command. When Reymann chose not to locate his office next to Goebbels's office in the Zoo Tower, Goebbels held that act against him. On 22 April, Hitler relieved Reymann of his command for his defeatism and replaced him with the newly-promoted Generalleutnant Ernst Kaether, who was the former Chief-of-Staff to the chief political commissar of the German Army (Heer). However, Kaether never took command and his orders were cancelled the next day. The result was that when the first Soviet Army units entered the suburbs of Berlin, there was no German commander to coordinate the city's defences.

One day later, Hitler changed his mind again and made Artillery General (General der Artillerie) Helmuth Weidling the new commander of the Berlin Defence Area. Weidling remained in command of Berlin's defenses to the end and ultimately surrendered the city on 2 May to Soviet General Vasily Chuikov.

=== Army Group Spree ===
After his dismissal as the commander of the Berlin Defence Area, Reymann was given a weak infantry division and a brigade sized Panzerkampfgruppe near Potsdam. The force received a dubious designation "Army Group Spree". Reymann's group could not then link up with General Walther Wenck's unit, just south of Potsdam, because of the strong Soviet Red Army forces. On 28/29 April, Wenck's 12th Army held the area around Beelitz long enough for a force of about 20,000 of both Reymann's men and troops from other units to escape through the narrow route to the Elbe.

== Awards ==
- Iron Cross 2nd and 1st Class
- Clasp to the Iron Cross (1939) 2nd Class (28 November 1939) & 1st Class (18 June 1940)
- German Cross in Gold on 22 November 1941 as Oberst in Infaterie-Regiment 205
- Knight's Cross of the Iron Cross (Ritterkreuz des Eisernen Kreuzes) with Oak Leaves (mit Eichenlaub)
  - Knight's Cross on 5 April 1944 as Generalleutnant and commander of the 13. Feld-Division (L).
  - 672nd Oak Leaves on 28 November 1944 as Generalleutnant and commander of the 11. Infanterie-Division

Military offices
Preceded by General der Artillerie Theodor Endres	Commander of 212. Infanterie-Division; 1 October 1942 – 1 October 1943	Succeeded by Generalmajor Dr. Karl Koske
Preceded by Generalleutnant Hans Korte	Commander of 13th Luftwaffe Field Division; 1 October 1943 - 1 April 1944	Succeeded by unit dissolved
Preceded by Generalleutnant Karl Burdach	Commander of 11. Infanterie-Division; 1 April 1944 – 18 November 1944	Succeeded by Generalmajor Gerhard Feyerabend
Preceded by Bruno Ritter von Hauenschild	Commanders of the Berlin Defense Area; 6 March – 22 April 1945	Succeeded by Ernst Kaether
