= Bruno Ritter von Hauenschild =

German general (1896–1953)

- Born: 9 June 1896; Würzburg, German Empire
- Died: 10 March 1953 (aged 56); Munich, West Germany
- Military career
- Allegiance: German Empire; Weimar Republic; Nazi Germany
- Branch: Army
- Rank: Generalleutnant
- Commands: 9th Motorized Recon Regiment; 7th Panzer Regiment; 4th Panzer Brigade; 24th Panzer Division
- Conflicts: World War I World War II
- Awards: Knight's Cross of the Iron Cross with Oak Leaves

Bruno Ritter von Hauenschild (9 June 1896 – 10 March 1953), born Bruno Hauenschild, was a general in the Wehrmacht of Nazi Germany during World War II

Hauenschild served in World War I; at the beginning of World War II, he rejoined the army as an officer. From 15 April to 12 September 1942, Hauenschild commanded the 24th Panzer Division. On 26 January 1945, Hauenschild was given command of the III Military District headquartered in Berlin. Hauenschild commanded the III Military District until 15 March. He was relieved of command of the Berlin Defence Area on 6 March due to illness and was replaced by Lieutenant-General (Generalleutnant) Helmuth Reymann.

== Awards and decorations ==
- Iron Cross (1914) 2nd Class (21 May 1915) & 1st Class (6 December 1917)
- Knight's Cross of the Royal House Order of Hohenzollern with Swords
- Knight's Cross of the Military Order of Max Joseph (2 September 1918)
- Clasp to the Iron Cross (1939) 2nd Class (24 September 1939) & 1st Class (19 October 1939)
- Knight's Cross of the Iron Cross with Oak Leaves
  - Knight's Cross on 25 August 1941 as Oberst and commander of 4. Panzer-Brigade
  - 129th Oak Leaves on 27 September 1942 as Generalmajor and commander of 24. Panzer-Division

Military offices
Preceded by General der Kavallerie Kurt Feldt	Commander of 24. Panzer-Division; 15 April 1942 – 12 September 1942	Succeeded by Generalleutnant Arno von Lenski
Preceded by None	Commanders of the Berlin Defense Area; Early 1945 to 6 March	Succeeded by Generalleutnant Helmuth Reymann
