= Scheidgen =

Town in the commune of Consdorf in eastern Luxembourg

Coordinates: 49°46′N 6°22′E

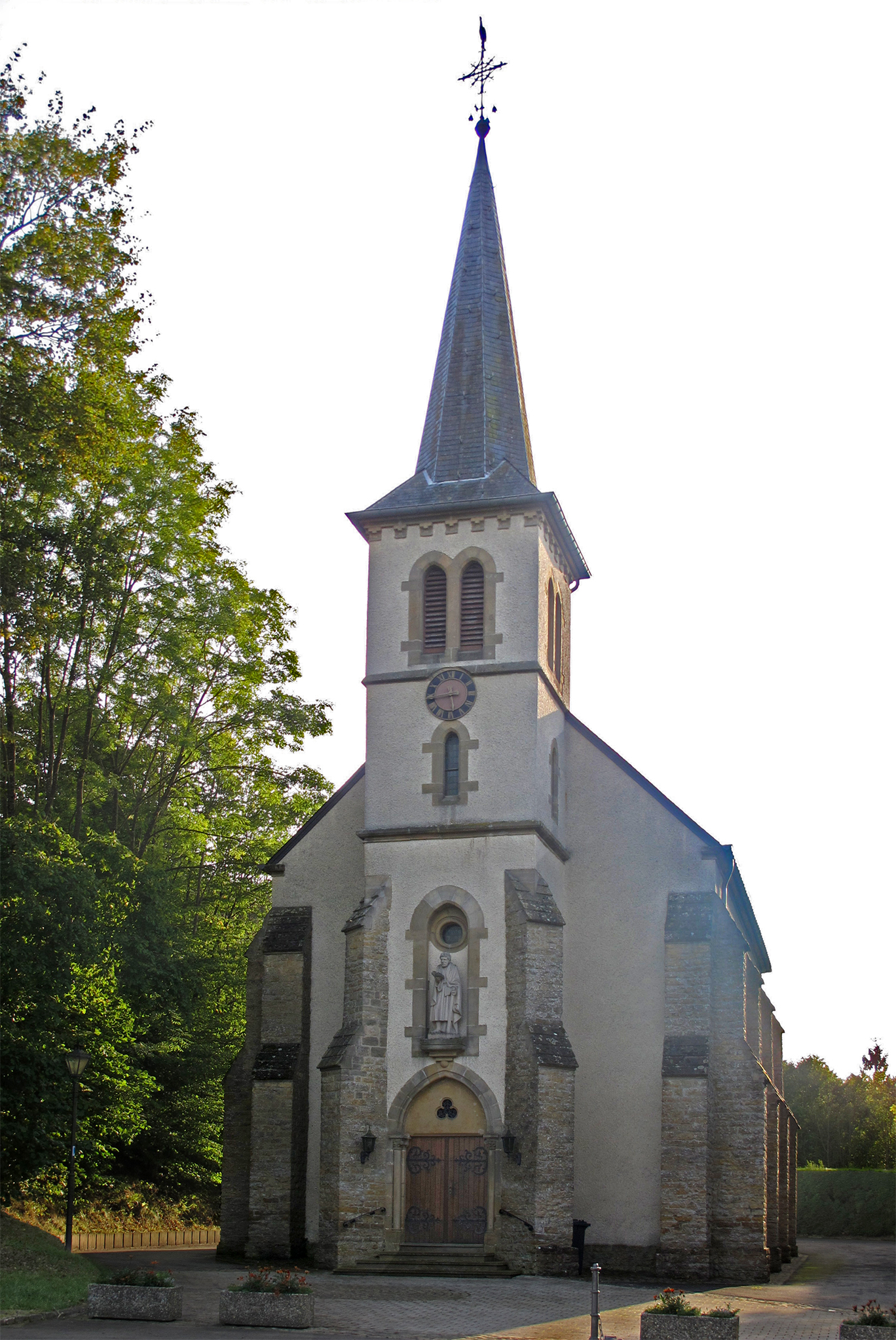
Church of Scheidgen, Luxembourg

Scheidgen (Luxembourgish: Scheedgen) is a town in the commune of Consdorf, in eastern Luxembourg. As of September 2026, the town has a population of 507.
