= Hans-Oscar Wöhlermann =

- Military career
- Allegiance: Nazi Germany
- Branch: Army
- Rank: Oberst
- Unit: Panzer Division Müncheberg
- Conflicts: World War II
- Awards: German Cross in Gold

Hans-Oscar Wöhlermann was a German officer during World War II.

Towards the end of the war, Wöhlermann took part in the Battle of the Seelow Heights and the Battle for Berlin.

During the night of 24 April 1945, the frantic reorganization of Berlin's defences added to the confusion and to the pressure on officers like Wöhlermann. To better allow General Helmuth Weidling to concentrate on his overall responsibilities as city commandant, Major-General Werner Mummert, commander of "Müncheberg" Tank Division (Panzer Division Müncheberg), was ordered to take over the eastern defense sectors A and B. Mummert was also given nominal charge of the LVI Tank Corps (LVI Panzer Korps).

Weidling then took with him his Chief-of-Staff, Colonel Theodor von Dufving, to look after the "military" side of his assignment, but kept Lieutenant Colonel Helmuth Reymann's former Chief-of-Staff, Colonel Hans Refior, to handle the "civil" side. The civil side included dealing with Joseph Goebbels and the Nazi Party. Wöhlermann was asked to take command of "Müncheberg", while still remaining in overall charge of artillery. All through the night, Weidling and his senior officers struggled to make some sort of sense of the shambles that had been forced upon them.

On 25 April, the "Nordland" SS Armored Infantry Division (SS Nordland Panzergrenadier Division) and "Müncheberg" were ordered by Weidling to launch a counterattack to clean up dangerous Soviet penetrations at Tempelhof Airfield and in Neukolln.

During the morning of 26 April, "Müncheberg" attacked southward from the northwest end of the Tempelhof Airfield with its last ten tanks. But the attack soon came to a halt due to Soviet defensive fire.

During that same morning, Weidling's command structure was changed yet again on the whims of German dictator Adolf Hitler. However, this time the change was for the good. Hitler promoted Lieutenant-Colonel (Oberstleutnant) Erich Bärenfänger to a Major-General (Generalmajor) and gave him the command of defence sectors A and B. This change meant that Mummert could return to the command of the "Müncheberg" Tank Division and Wöhlermann could concentrate on his job as artillery commander. For Weidling, this was a great improvement. For the men of "Müncheberg," experiencing their third change of command in little more than twenty-four hours, it merely added to their total bewilderment.

== Awards ==
- German Cross in Gold (27 October 1941)
