= Bobruysk offensive =

June 1944 military offensive in the Byelorussian Soviet Socialist Republic

- Part of Operation Bagration
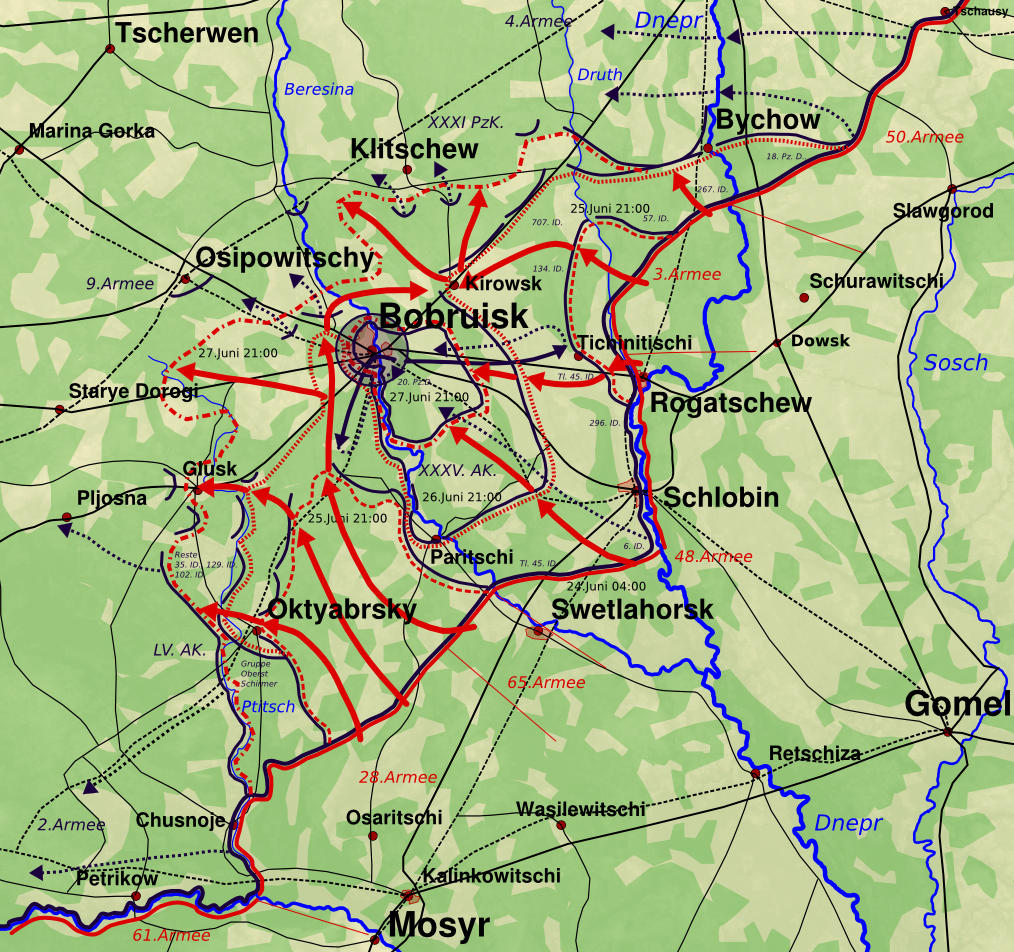
- Development of the Bobruysk operation during soviet offensive Operation Bagration from June 24, 1944, 4:00 AM to June 27, 1944, 9:00 PM
Date	23–28 June 1944
Location	Belorussian SSR 53.1°N 29.2°E
Result	Soviet victory

Belligerents
Germany	Soviet Union

Commanders and leaders
(Nazi Germany) Hans Jordan (Ninth Army) (Nazi Germany) Gustav Gihr (surrendered) (707th Division)	(Soviet Union) Konstantin Rokossovsky (1st Belorussian Front)

Strength
90,000–100,000	490,000–495,000

Casualties and losses
50,000 killed, 20,000 captured, 12,000 escaped encirclement	7,061 killed and missing

The Bobruysk offensive (Russian: Бобруйская наступательная операция) was part of the Belorussian strategic offensive of the Red Army in summer 1944, commonly known as Operation Bagration. In less than a week in late June 1944, the Soviet 3rd Army broke through in the north of the sector, trapping the German XXXV Corps against the Berezina. The 65th Army then broke through the XXXXI Panzer Corps to the south; by 27 June, the two German corps were encircled in a pocket east of Bobruysk under constant aerial bombardment.

Up to 70,000 Axis soldiers were killed or taken prisoner. Bobruysk was liberated on 29 June after intense street fighting.

== Planning ==
=== Operational goals ===
The operational goals of the Bobruysk offensive within the context of Operation Bagration were twofold:

- To break through the defensive positions of Ninth Army and take the heavily fortified city of Bobruysk.
- Commit motorised / cavalry exploitation forces through the gap opened, opening the way for a major encirclement of much of the remainder of Army Group Centre in the Minsk offensive.

=== German intelligence ===
Ninth Army headquarters had argued particularly strongly that a major attack against Army Group Centre was imminent, and General Jordan had bitterly complained about the high command's refusal to sanction tactical withdrawals, but the Army Group commander, Field Marshal Busch, had brushed these concerns aside. Patrols of the 134th Infantry Division had revealed a buildup in the sector of the 35th and 41st Guards Rifle Corps opposite; each of the three regiments of the German divisions was faced with a full-strength Soviet rifle division of 7,200 men.

The Ninth Army was, in general, made up of lower quality divisions than Fourth Army to its north; this may have reflected a belief on the part of the OKH that the terrain in Ninth Army's sector was more easily defensible.

== Deployments ==
=== Wehrmacht ===
- Ninth Army (General Hans Jordan)
  - XXXV Corps (Lieutenant-General Kurt-Jürgen Freiherr von Lützow)
  - XXXXI Panzer Corps (Lieutenant-General Edmund Hoffmeister)
  - LV Corps (General Friedrich Herrlein)
  - Reserve: 20th Panzer Division, 707th Infantry Division (Major General Gustav Gihr)

The city of Bobruysk had been designated a Fester Platz, or fortified area to be held at all costs, under the command of Major-General Adolf Hamann.

The above units were under the overall command of Army Group Centre (Field-Marshal Ernst Busch).

=== Red Army ===
- 1st Belorussian Front (Marshal Konstantin Rokossovsky)
  - 3rd Army (General Alexander Gorbatov)
  - 28th Army
  - 48th Army
  - 65th Army (General Pavel Batov)
  - 16th Air Army
  - Cavalry mechanized group under command of Lieutenant-General Issa Pliyev (KMG Pliev), including 1st Mechanised Corps, 4th Guards Cavalry Corps

The above units were under the command of the special representative to Stavka, Marshal Georgy Zhukov.

== The offensive ==
In the southern sector of operations, where the 1st Belorussian Front under Konstantin Rokossovsky faced Hans Jordan's Ninth Army, the main Soviet objective was Bobruysk and the southern crossings of the Berezina, which would open up the route for the southern 'pincer' of the main encirclement. (Army Group Centre's southernmost flank was covered by Second Army in the Pripet Marshes, but this area was largely bypassed by the Soviet offensive.) Rokossovsky had bravely staked his reputation on a plan for a complex double-envelopment of the German forces at Babruysk, in opposition to Joseph Stalin's preferred plan of a single breakthrough in the sector.

Rokossovsky's attack, as with the other initial offensive operations of Operation Bagration, was preceded by a heavy artillery bombardment. The first assault, against strong German defences, was however repulsed with heavy casualties. Rokossovsky ordered further artillery preparation for June 24, which eventually resulted in a collapse of the 134th Infantry Division to the north of the sector, as the Soviet 3rd Army pushed forward; the 20th Panzer Division began to counter-attack, but Jordan then ordered it to turn southwards and confront a new breakthrough by the Soviet 65th Army under Batov.

=== The encirclement of the German corps ===
For the offensive, Rokossovsky's First Belorussian Front would be using the multi-pronged offensive against Bobruisk. In the north, Marshal Georgy Zhukov was inspecting the attack by the 3rd Army from Rogachev, while Rokossovsky was in the south, launching his assault from Parichi. Inevitably, a rivalry had developed between the two generals, as both competed to be the first to crack the defence lines of the Ninth Army. On 24 June 1944, an earth-shaking artillery barrage consisting of 7000 guns, mortars and BM-13 Katyusha rocket launchers began in an attempt to annihilate the Germans. However, the northern sector of the front under Zhukov was met with stiff resistance and there was not much breakthroughs in the Rogachev direction. Rokossovsky encountered less difficulties with the Germans and was able to make rapid advancements in his area. In what was considered to be an old fashion Russian offensive, Issa Pliev's Cavalry-Mechanized Group(KMG), consisting of the mighty 4th Guards Cavalry Corps and the 1st Mechanised Corps, was the spearhead of the assault, with the 28th Army and 65th Army securing its flanks.

Pliev's KMG was able to travel across the adverse terrain of the marshes without much challenges, and struck the Ninth Army's southern flank. The KMG then cut south towards Slutsk in order to prevent the Ninth Army from retreating towards the south. By then, the Ninth Army had been cut off and it was doomed to be destroyed.

By June 27, Soviet forces were converging near Bobruysk, trapping the five divisions of Ninth Army's northernmost corps, Lieutenant-General von Lützow's XXXV Corps, east of the Berezina. Elements of the central XXXXI Panzer Corps were also trapped, along with the 20th Panzer Division. The disorganised German divisions commenced a series of desperate attempts to escape the pocket, which stretched for several kilometers along the river's eastern bank: the Soviets reported large fires on 27 June as the Germans destroyed their heavy equipment and attempted to break out, but Soviet air attack and artillery inflicted appalling casualties on the encircled forces. In the meantime, Hitler had relieved Jordan of command due to his confusing instructions to 20th Panzer; Ninth Army was dealt another blow when its main communications headquarters was destroyed by bombing. On the following day, reinforcements arrived behind German lines in the form of 12th Panzer Division, whose commander was greeted by Ninth Army's chief of staff with the words "Good to see you — Ninth Army no longer exists!" On 28 June 1944, the Ninth Army was officially destroyed, and Hans Jordan would be relieved of command for the inability to bring up 20th Panzer Division as the reinforcement.

=== The breakout of XLI Panzer Corps ===
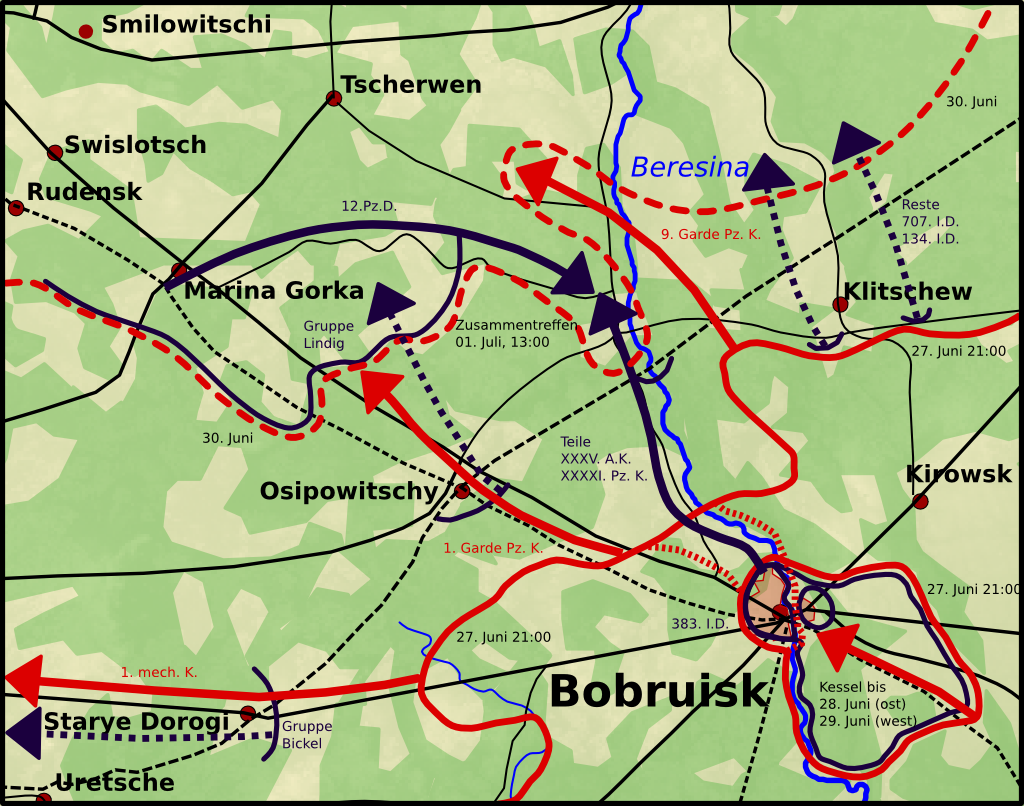
final stage of bobruisk operation (June 27, 0900 PM - July 1, 1944)

Faced with Ninth Army's imminent collapse, OKH authorised a withdrawal. Lieutenant-General Adolf Hamann, Commander (Commandant) of Bobruysk, was ordered to hold the town with one division, Lieutenant-General Edmund Hoffmeister's 383rd Infantry Division. Thousands of wounded were abandoned in the citadel. The remnants of 20th Panzer Division, with a handful of tanks and assault guns, formed a spearhead for XXXXI Panzer Corps' breakout attempt which was placed under Hoffmeister's overall command, while 12th Panzer Division attacked from the Svislach River to meet the retreating troops. Though a breakout was achieved through positions held by the Soviet 356th Rifle Division of 65th Army, the German forces were again subjected to intense artillery bombardment and air attack as they attempted to make their way along the roads south of Minsk.

=== The 65th Army takes Bobruysk ===
Batov's 65th Army now fought their way into Bobruysk street by street against stiff resistance from the German rearguard. Bobruysk, in ruins and with much of its population killed during the German occupation, was liberated on June 29, the 383rd Infantry Division commencing withdrawal towards dawn: no further elements of Ninth Army would escape from east of the Berezina. The German breakout had allowed around 12,000 troops - mostly demoralised and without weapons - from the pocket east of Bobruysk to get out, but the Soviets claimed 20,000 taken prisoner. A further 50,000 were dead: Soviet accounts speak of the area being carpeted with bodies and littered with abandoned materiel. The Soviet writer, Vasily Grossman, entered Bobruysk shortly after the end of the battle:

"Men are walking over German corpses. Corpses, hundreds and thousands of them, pave the road, lie in ditches, under the pines, in the green barley. In some places, vehicles have to drive over the corpses, so densely they lie upon the ground [...] A cauldron of death was boiling here, where the revenge was carried out"

Ninth Army had been decisively defeated, and the southern route to Minsk was open.

== Accounts, further reading ==
In addition to Vasily Grossman, the writer and future dissident Aleksandr Solzhenitsyn was present at Babruysk as an artillery officer; the experience is mentioned in The Gulag Archipelago.

Gerd Niepold, the 1st Staff Officer of 12th Panzer Division, later wrote a comprehensive account of Operation Bagration, Mittlere Ostfront Juni 1944.
