= Hans Krebs (Wehrmacht general) =

German Wehrmacht Heer general (1898–1945)

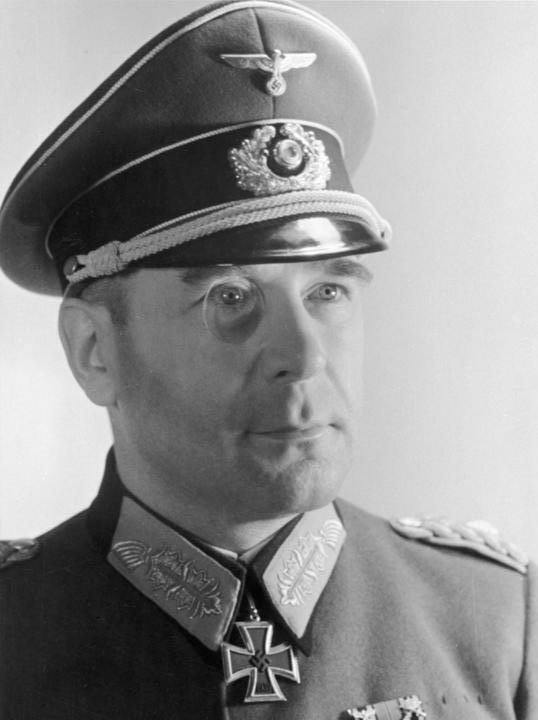
- Krebs in 1944

Chief of the General Staff of the German Army High Command
- In office 1 April 1945 – 2 May 1945
- Leader: Adolf Hitler; Karl Dönitz
- Preceded by: Heinz Guderian
- Succeeded by: Wilhelm Keitel (acting)

Personal details
- Born: Hans Otto Wilhelm Eugen Krebs; 4 March 1898 Helmstedt, Duchy of Brunswick, German Empire
- Died: 2 May 1945 (aged 47) Berlin, Germany
- Cause of death: Suicide by gunshot

Military service
- Allegiance: Nazi Germany
- Branch/service: Imperial German Army; Reichswehr; German Army
- Years of service: 1914–1945
- Rank: General der Infanterie
- Commands: Chief of General Staff of the OKH
- Battles/wars: World War I; Battle of Verdun; World War II; Western Front; Battle of France; Eastern Front; Operation Mars; Operation Citadel; Operation Bagration; Operation Market-Garden; Battle of the Bulge; Battle of Berlin (as Chief of General Staff of OKH) ‡‡
- Awards: Knight's Cross of the Iron Cross with Oak Leaves

Hans Otto Wilhelm Eugen Krebs (4 March 1898 – 2 May 1945) (Note: Krebs apparently committed suicide after midnight on 2 May, although some other sources state it occurred before midnight on 1 May.) was a German Army general of infantry who served during World War II. A career soldier, he served in the Imperial German Army, Reichswehr and the Wehrmacht’s Heer. He served as the last Chief of Staff of the Oberkommando des Heeres (OKH) for the Wehrmacht High Command (OKW) during the final phase of the war in Europe (1 April to 1 May 1945). Krebs tried to open negotiations to surrender with the Red Army, which failed; he committed suicide in the Führerbunker during the early hours of 2 May 1945, two days after Adolf Hitler killed himself.

== Early life and education ==
Krebs was born in Helmstedt. He volunteered for service in the Imperial German Army in 1914, becoming an officer in 1915.

== Military career ==
In 1931, Krebs worked in the Defence Ministry, where he maintained contacts with the Red Army in the context of joint military exercises conducted by the two countries. Krebs held strong antisemitic and anti-communist views, as evidenced by his description of the members of a Soviet military delegation that visited Berlin in 1932: "a sly and cunning Jew ... [and] a Jewish half-breed ... insincere, with a suspicious and treacherous nature, apparently a fanatic Communist."

In 1936, Krebs was posted to the German embassy in Moscow as a military attaché; he spoke excellent Russian. Krebs held this position up to the invasion of the Soviet Union. As such, he played a role in the Wehrmacht's faulty intelligence regarding the capabilities of the Red Army.

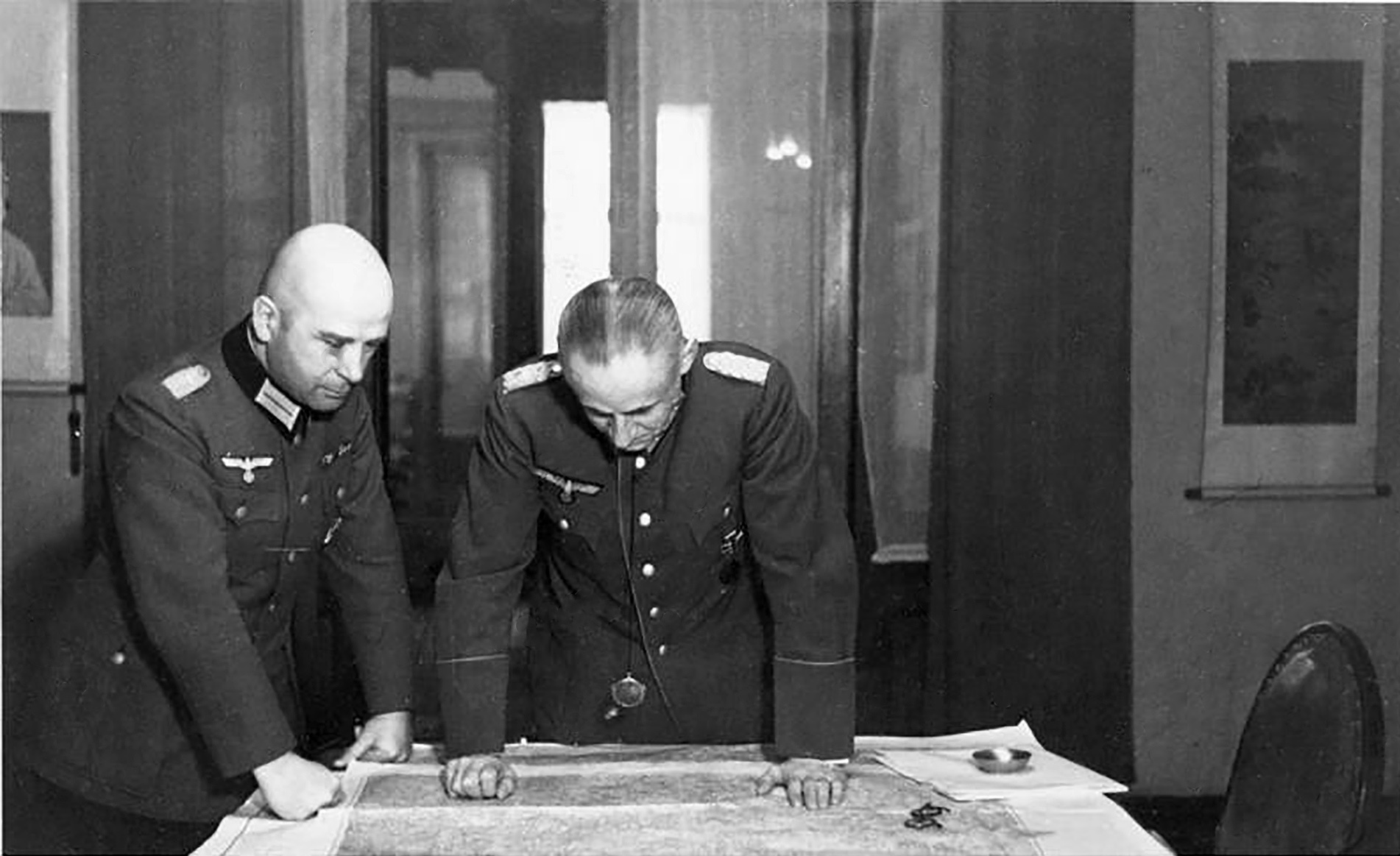
Krebs (left) with Köstring in 1941

He held the position of deputy military attaché in 1941. On 1 May 1941, the German military delegation, including Krebs and Ernst August Köstring, attended the Soviet military parade in Moscow in honour of International Workers' Day.

== World War II ==
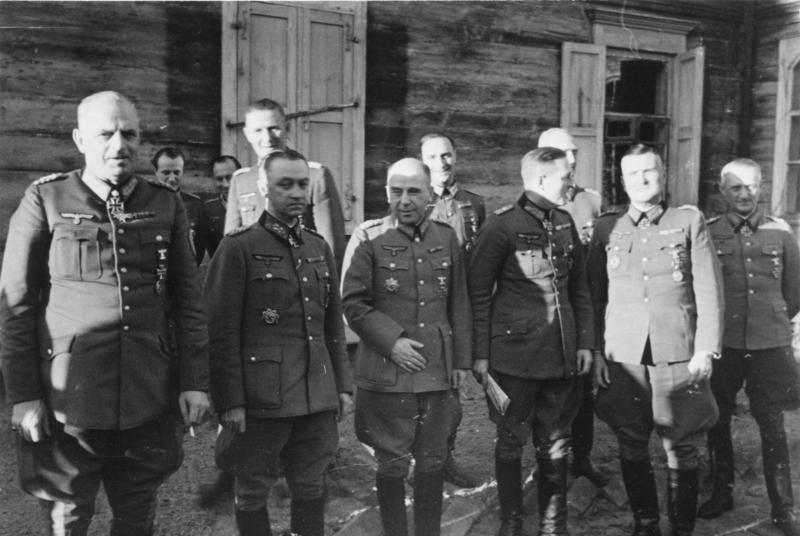
Krebs (middle) standing outside of a wooden house with his Army Group Centre staff in May 1944

During World War II, Krebs had various staff positions. While serving on the Eastern Front, Krebs was promoted to the rank of Generalmajor when Chief of Staff of the 9th Army in February 1942. In March 1943, he was made Chief of Staff of Army Group Centre. In April 1943, he was promoted to Generalleutnant and became a General of Infantry in August 1944. Krebs served as Chief of Staff of Army Group B on the Western Front from September 1944 to February 1945, when he was appointed Deputy Chief of the Army General Staff.

=== Berlin, 1945 ===
On 1 April 1945, Krebs was appointed Chief of the Army General Staff (OKH). Krebs was in the Führerbunker below the Reich Chancellery garden during the Battle of Berlin.

On 28 April 1945, Krebs made his last telephone call from the Führerbunker. He called Field Marshal Wilhelm Keitel at the new Supreme Command Headquarters in Fürstenberg. He told Keitel that if relief did not arrive within 48 hours, all was lost. Keitel promised to exert the utmost pressure on General Walther Wenck, who commanded the German 12th Army, and General Theodor Busse, who commanded the German 9th Army. The 12th Army was attacking towards Berlin from the west and the 9th Army was attacking from the south. Adolf Hitler had ordered both armies to link up and to come to the relief of Berlin. In addition, forces under General Rudolf Holste were to attack towards Berlin from the north.

Later on 28 April, when it was discovered that Heinrich Himmler was trying to negotiate a backdoor surrender to the western Allies via Count Folke Bernadotte, Krebs became part of a military tribunal ordered by Hitler to court-martial Himmler's SS liaison officer Hermann Fegelein. Fegelein was by that time Eva Braun's brother-in-law. SS-General Wilhelm Mohnke presided over the tribunal which, in addition to Krebs and Mohnke, included SS-General Johann Rattenhuber and General Wilhelm Burgdorf. However, Fegelein was so drunk that he was crying, vomiting and unable to stand up; he even urinated on the floor. It was the opinion of the judges that he was in no condition to stand trial. Therefore, Mohnke closed the proceedings and turned Fegelein over to Rattenhuber and his security squad instead.

On 29 April, Krebs, Burgdorf, Joseph Goebbels, and Martin Bormann witnessed and signed the last will and testament of Adolf Hitler. Hitler dictated the document to his personal private secretary, Traudl Junge. Bormann was head of the Party Chancellery (Parteikanzlei) and private secretary to Hitler. Late that evening, Krebs contacted General Alfred Jodl (Supreme Army Command) by radio and made the following demands: "Request immediate report. Firstly, of the whereabouts of Wenck's spearheads. Secondly, of time intended to attack. Thirdly, of the location of the 9th Army. Fourthly, of the precise place in which the 9th Army will break through. Fifthly, of the whereabouts of General Holste's spearhead."

In the early morning of 30 April, Jodl replied to Krebs: "Firstly, Wenck's spearhead bogged down south of Schwielow Lake. Secondly, 12th Army therefore unable to continue attack on Berlin. Thirdly, bulk of 9th Army surrounded. Fourthly, Holste's Corps on the defensive." Later that afternoon, Hitler and Eva Braun committed suicide.

=== Surrender and suicide ===
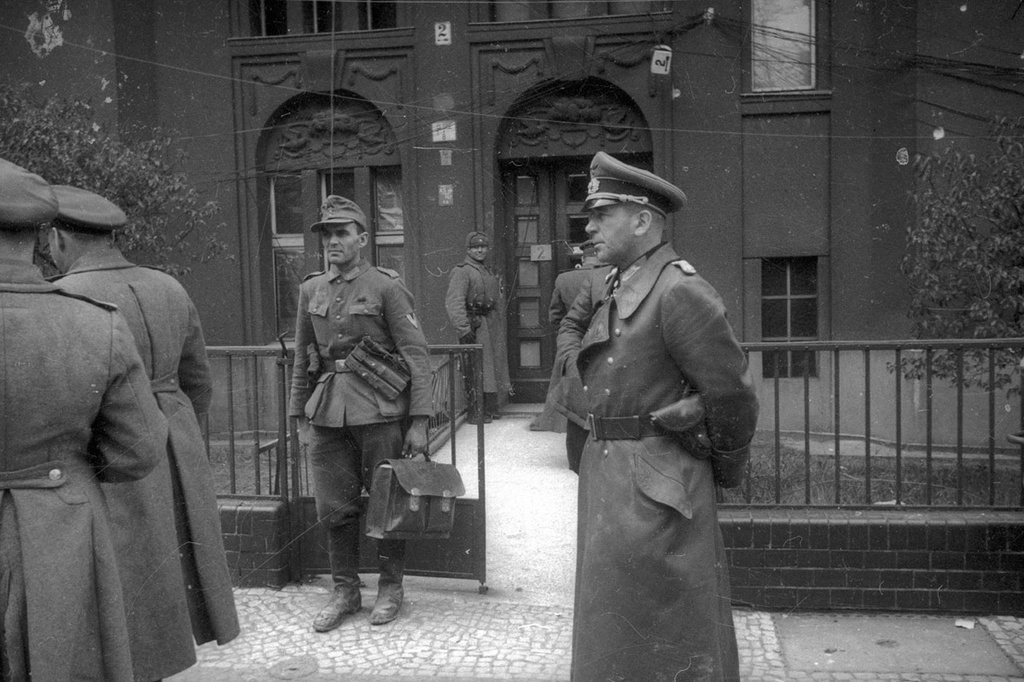
Krebs at the headquarters of General Vasily Chuikov

On 1 May, after Hitler's suicide on 30 April, Goebbels sent Krebs and Colonel Theodor von Dufving, under a white flag, to deliver a letter he had written to General Vasily Chuikov. Dufving was Helmuth Weidling's Chief of Staff. The letter contained surrender terms acceptable to Goebbels. Chuikov, as commander of the Soviet 8th Guards Army, commanded the Soviet forces in central Berlin. Krebs arrived shortly before 4:00 a.m. Krebs, who spoke Russian, informed Chuikov that Hitler and Eva Braun, his wife, had killed themselves in the Führerbunker. Chuikov, who was not aware that there was a bunker complex under the Reich Chancellery or that Hitler was married, calmly subterfuged that he already knew all that. Chuikov was not, however, prepared to accept the terms in Goebbels' letter or to negotiate with Krebs. The Soviets were unwilling to accept anything other than unconditional surrender. Krebs was not authorized by Goebbels to agree to such terms and so the meeting ended with no agreement. According to Traudl Junge, Krebs returned to the bunker looking "worn out, exhausted". Krebs' surrender of Berlin was thus impeded as long as Goebbels was alive.

At around 8:30 p.m. on 1 May, Goebbels removed this impediment by committing suicide. After Goebbels' death, Krebs himself became suicidal. The responsibility for surrendering the city fell to General Helmuth Weidling, the commander of the Berlin Defense Area. On 2 May, with Krebs in no condition to do it himself, Weidling contacted Chuikov to again discuss surrender. Weidling and Chuikov met and had the following conversation in which Chuikov asked about Krebs:

Chuikov: "You are the commander of the Berlin garrison?"
Weidling: "Yes, I am the commander of the LVI Panzer Corps."
Chuikov: "Where is Krebs?"

Weidling: "I saw him yesterday in the Reich Chancellery. I thought he would commit suicide. At first he (Krebs) criticized me because unofficial capitulation started yesterday. The order regarding capitulation has been issued today."

As the Soviets advanced on the Reich Chancellery, Krebs was last seen by others, including Junge, in the Führerbunker when they left to attempt to escape. Junge relates how she approached Krebs to say goodbye and how he straightened up and smoothed his uniform before greeting her for the last time. Krebs and General Wilhelm Burgdorf, along with SS-Obersturmbannführer Franz Schädle of the Führerbegleitkommando, stayed behind with the intention of committing suicide. Sometime in the early morning hours of 2 May, Krebs and Burgdorf committed suicide together by gunshot to the head. Their bodies were later found when Soviet personnel entered the bunker complex. Schädle also committed suicide by gunshot on 2 May 1945.

Thereafter, the corpses of Krebs, the Goebbels family along with the remains of Hitler's dogs were repeatedly buried and exhumed by the Soviets. The last burial was at the SMERSH facility in Magdeburg on 21 February 1946. In 1970, KGB chief Yuri Andropov authorised an operation to destroy the remains. On 4 April 1970, a Soviet KGB team with detailed burial charts secretly exhumed five wooden boxes. The remains from the boxes were thoroughly burned and crushed, with the ashes then thrown into the Biederitz river, a tributary of the nearby Elbe.

== Positions held ==
His last decade saw the following appointments:

- 1936–1939: military attaché in Moscow (Krebs spoke fluent Russian)
- 1939: Chief of Army Training Section
- 1939–1942: Chief of Staff VII Corps
- 1942–1943: Chief of Staff German Ninth Army, Eastern Front
- 1943–1944: Chief of Staff Army Group Centre, Eastern Front
- 1944–1945: Chief of Staff Army Group B, Western Front
- 1945: Deputy Chief of the Army General Staff (OKH)
- 1945, 1 April – 1 May: Chief of the Army General Staff (OKH)

== Awards ==
- Iron Cross (1914) 2nd Class (22 August 1915) & 1st Class (6 February 1917)
- Knight's Cross of the Royal House Order of Hohenzollern with swords
- The Honour Cross of the World War 1914/1918 with swords
- Wound Badge (1918) in black
- Wehrmacht Long Service Award (4th Class to 1st Class)
- Eastern Front Medal
- Brunswick War Merit Cross, 1st Class & 2nd Class with Frontline Service Clasp
- Friedrich-August-Kreuz, 1st Class & 2nd Class
- Clasp to the Iron Cross (1939) 2nd Class (14 May 1940) & 1st Class (18 May 1940)
- German Cross in Gold on 26 January 1942 as Oberst im Generalstab in the VII Army Corps
- Knight's Cross of the Iron Cross
  - Knight's Cross on 26 March 1944 as Generalleutnant and Chief of General Staff of Army Group Centre
  - 749th Oak Leaves on 20 February 1945 as General der Infanterie and Chief of Staff of Army Group B

Promotions

- Fahnenjunker–Gefreiter – 11 December 1914
- Fahnenjunker–Unteroffizier – 5 January 1915
- Fähnrich – 22 March 1915
- Leutnant – 18 June 1915
- Oberleutnant – 31 July 1925
- Kapitän – 1 October 1931
- Major – 1 January 1936
- Oberstleutnant – 1 February 1939
- Oberst – 1 October 1940
- Generalmajor – 1 February 1942
- Generalleutnant – 1 April 1943
- General der Infanterie – 1 August 1944

== See also ==
- Battle in Berlin – 1945
- Downfall, 2004 film where Krebs is portrayed by Rolf Kanies
- Gotthard Heinrici, Commander of Army Group Vistula
- Last will and testament of Adolf Hitler

Military offices
Preceded by Heinz Guderian	Chief of Staff of the OKH; April 1945 – May 1945	Succeeded by Wilhelm Keitel
