= Adolf Hamann =

German general (1885–1945)

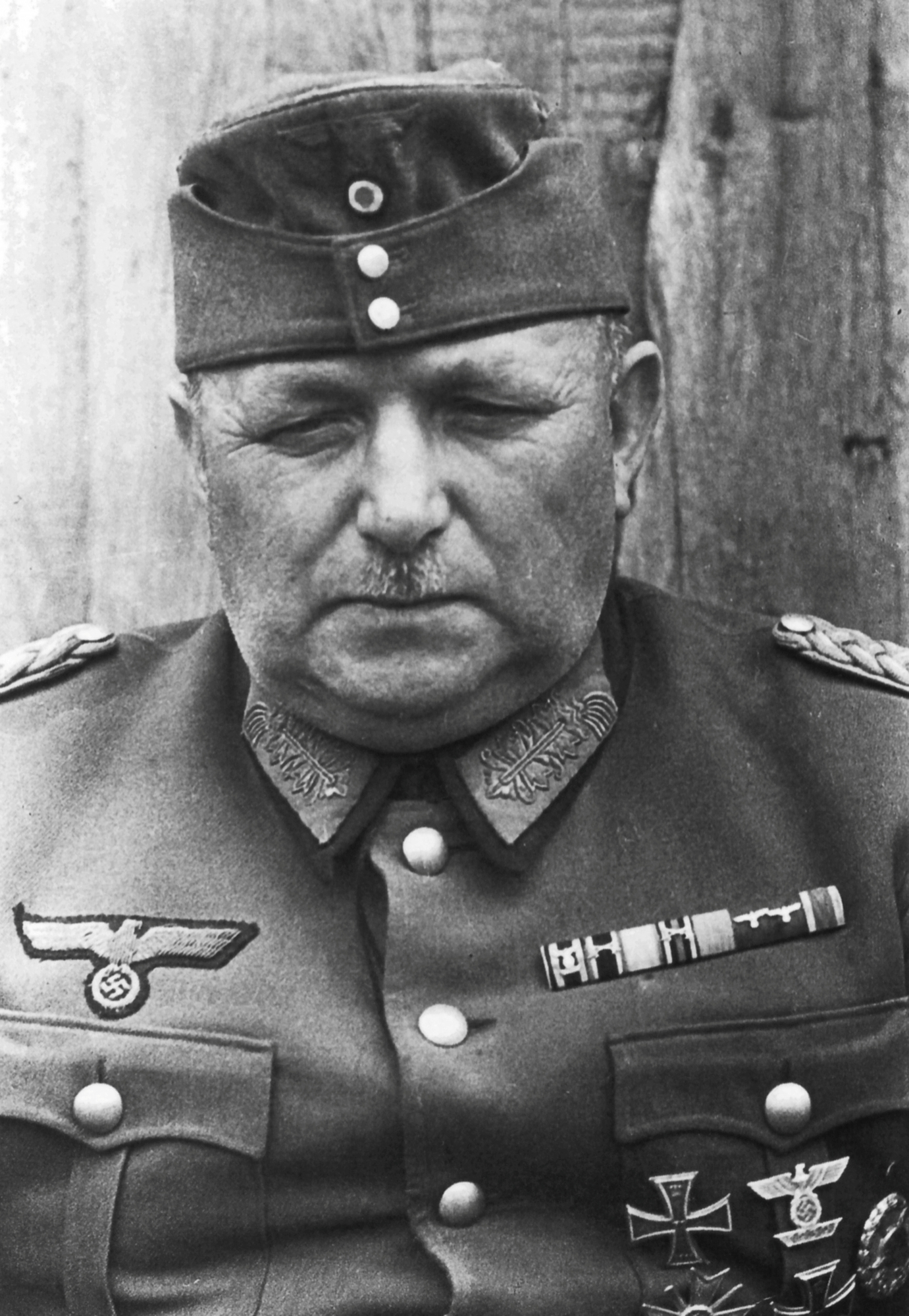
- Born: 3 September 1885; Groß Laasch, Mecklenburg-Schwerin, German Empire
- Died: 30 December 1945 (aged 60); Bryansk, Russian SFSR, Soviet Union
- Cause of death: Execution by hanging
- Burial place: German prisoner-of-war cemetery, Bryansk
- Military career
- Allegiance: German Empire (1901–1918); Weimar Republic (1919–1933); Nazi Germany (1933–1944)
- Branch: German Army
- Rank: Generalleutnant
- Conflicts: World War I World War II

Adolf Hamann (3 September 1885 – 30 December 1945) was a German general who was executed for war crimes.

== Early life and inter-war years ==
Hamann joined the Schwerin 89th Grenadier Regiment on 16 July 1901. In 1914, during the first year of World War I, he was twice awarded the Iron Cross. In the inter-war years, Hamann served in the Reichswehr and then the Wehrmacht.

== World War II ==
Immediately after the German invasion of Poland, Hamann was given the command of a frontier defense zone on the Polish border, which he held until 8 January 1940. Afterwards, he commanded a reserve infantry battalion until 25 July 1941. From 4 August until 14 January the following year, he headed a regiment in the 239th Infantry Division. After the division was dissolved, he was transferred to the Führerreserve, where he remained until 1 April. Then he was posted as the commander of a regiment in the 370th Division, stationed at Reims, in the French Zone occupée. He was recalled to the reserve on 14 May.

On 1 June 1942, he was promoted to major general and sent to serve as the military commander of Oryol, in the German-occupied area of the Soviet Union. During the Battle of Kursk, while still commandant of Oryol, he was the chief of Gruppe Hamann - a support formation which consisted mainly of the 3rd Brandenburg Regiment and existed from 20 July to 1 August as part of General Lothar Rendulic's XXXV Corps. On 4 August, after Oryol's liberation in Operation Kutuzov, he was made commandant of Bryansk. When it was retaken by the Red Army on 17 September, he became the military commander in Bobruisk, in Belorussia. On 20 June, he was given command of the 383rd Infantry Division, replacing General Edmund Hoffmeister, while retaining his position as commandant of what was now the Fortified Area Bobruisk.

== Surrender and trial ==
On 22 June 1944, the Red Army launched Operation Bagration. The Soviet forces soon overwhelmed the German forces stationed near Bobruisk and encircled the city on the 27th. On 28 June 1944, Hamann, along with the rest of the Bobruisk garrison, was taken prisoner. On 17 July, he was paraded through the streets of Moscow with 50,000 other captured German soldiers, in the aftermath of Bagration.

On 29 December 1945, a Soviet military tribunal convicted him of war crimes against the civilian populations of Bryansk and Bobruisk. Hamann was sentenced to death and hanged the next day.
