= Mummert =

Mummert is a German surname. Notable people with the surname include:

- Chuck Mummert, current mayor of Elizabethtown, Pennsylvania
- Werner Mummert (1897–1950), general in the German Wehrmacht

== See also ==
- The dictionary definition of Mummert at Wiktionary
