= General Lorenz =

General Lorenz may refer to:

- Karl Lorenz (1904–1964), German Panzer Division major general
- Stephen R. Lorenz (born 1951), U.S. Air Force four-star general
- Werner Lorenz (1891–1974), German Waffen-SS general
- Wilhelm Lorenz (1894–1943), German Wehrmacht major general
