= Theodor von Dufving =

Wehrmacht officer (1907–2001)

- Born: Theoderich Heinrich August Wilhelm von Dufving; 1907
- Died: 2001 (aged 93–94)
- Military career
- Allegiance: Nazi Germany
- Branch: Wehrmacht
- Unit: 76th Infantry Division
- Conflicts: World War II; Eastern Front; Battle for Berlin

Theoderich Heinrich August Wilhelm von Dufving (1907–2001), known as Theodor von Dufving, was a German officer of the Wehrmacht during the Second World War.

In May 1945 he was one of the last Germans to enter the Führerbunker, shortly after the death of Adolf Hitler.

A soldier before 1939, Dufving fought on the Eastern Front, where he enjoyed unusually fast promotion and became the chief-of-staff to General Helmuth Weidling, the commanding officer of the LVI Tank Corps (LVI Panzerkorps). In 1944, he completed Senior Staff Officers' training at the Prussian Military Academy, and was then assigned as chief of staff of the 76th Panzer Artillery Regiment, with the rank of Colonel.

During the Battle for Berlin, Dufving was again the military chief-of-staff to General Helmuth Weidling. On 1 May 1945, after Hitler's suicide on 30 April, the new German Chancellor, Joseph Goebbels, sent General Hans Krebs and Dufving, under a white flag, to deliver a letter he had written to Soviet General Vasily Chuikov. Chuikov, as commander of the Soviet 8th Guards Army, commanded the Soviet forces in central Berlin. Krebs, having been a fluent Russian speaker, had been brushing up in front of his shaving mirror, but Dufving took a Latvian officer with them as a Russian interpreter.

The letter that Goebbels gave Krebs to deliver to Chuikov contained surrender terms acceptable to Goebbels. However, Chuikov was not prepared to accept the terms proposed in Goebbels' letter or to negotiate with Krebs. The Soviets were unwilling to accept anything other than unconditional surrender, but Krebs was not authorised by Goebbels to agree to an unconditional surrender, and the meeting ended with no agreement. Both Goebbels and Krebs committed suicide shortly afterwards.

Early the next day, Dufving was sent to arrange for General Weidling to meet General Chuikov. Weidling left for his meeting with Chuikov about one hour before Dufving and his party followed him.

At 5:55 a.m. on 2 May 1945, Dufving, Hans Refior, Siegfried Knappe and a German major led a column of roughly 100 German soldiers to the end of the Bendlerstraße. Knappe was also a member of Weidling's staff. The Soviets were waiting for them on the other side of the Landwehr Canal (Landwehrkanal).

The highest-ranking Soviet officer crossed to the German side of the bridge, and Dufving saluted and reported to him. The Soviet officer spoke to Dufving for a moment and then returned to the other side of the canal, where about two dozen Soviet soldiers with submachine guns were waiting with several American-made jeeps. The column of Germans crossed the bridge, walking upright and in single file. The Soviet soldiers all had big grins on their faces, and one Soviet soldier said "Hitler kaput" to the German prisoners, and all of the other Soviet soldiers laughed.

The German prisoners were then transported to Chuikov's headquarters near Tempelhof Airport, where they met Weidling. Once inside Chuikov's headquarters, Weidling ordered Knappe to type an order directing all German forces still in Berlin to halt all forms of resistance.

Dufving then began a period of several years as a prisoner of the Soviets.

Dufving died in 2001.
