= Müncheberg (disambiguation) =

Müncheberg is a small town in Märkisch-Oderland, Germany.

Müncheberg may also refer to:

- Panzer Division Müncheberg, a German panzer division

== People with the surname ==
- Joachim Müncheberg (1918 – 1943), German Luftwaffe fighter ace during World War II

== See also ==
- Münchberg
