= Helmuth Weidling =

German general (1891–1955)

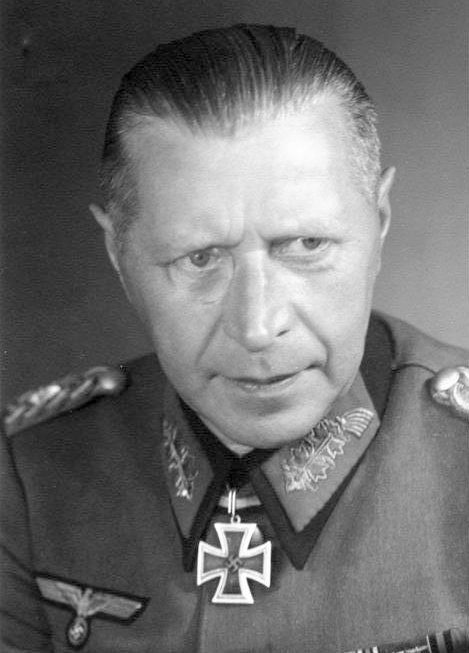
- Weidling in 1943

Commander of the Berlin Defence Area
- In office 23 April 1945 – 2 May 1945
- Preceded by: Ernst Kaether
- Succeeded by: Office abolished

Personal details
- Born: 2 November 1891 Halberstadt, Province of Saxony, Kingdom of Prussia, German Empire
- Died: 17 November 1955 (aged 64) Vladimir Central Prison, Russian SFSR, Soviet Union

Military service
- Allegiance: German Empire; Weimar Republic; Nazi Germany
- Branch: Imperial German Army; Reichswehr; German Army
- Years: 1911–1945
- Rank: General der Artillerie
- Commands: XL Panzer Corps; XLI Panzer Corps; LVI Panzer Corps; Berlin Defense Area
- Battles/wars: World War I; World War II; Invasion of Poland; Invasion of France; Invasion of the Soviet Union; Battle of Berlin (surrendered)
- Awards: Knight's Cross of the Iron Cross with Oak Leaves and Swords

Helmuth Otto Ludwig Weidling (2 November 1891 – 17 November 1955) was a German general during the Second World War. He was the last commander of the Berlin Defence Area during the Battle of Berlin, led the defence of the city against Soviet forces and finally surrendered just before the end of World War II in Europe. Taken prisoner by the Russians, he was put on trial for war crimes, sentenced to 25 years in prison and died while still incarcerated.

== Military career ==
Born in Halberstadt in 1891, Weidling entered the military in 1911 and served as a lieutenant in the First World War. He remained in the reduced army of the Weimar Republic after the war.

As an artillery officer, he took part in the invasion of Poland and the Battle of France and during the early stages of Operation Barbarossa, the invasion of the Soviet Union. In January 1942, still on the Eastern Front, Weidling was appointed commander of the 86th Infantry Division.

=== Corps commander ===
On 15 October 1943, Weidling became the commander of the XLI Panzer Corps, a position he held until 10 April 1945 with a short break in his command from 19 June 1944 to 1 July 1944. During this break, Generalleutnant Edmund Hoffmeister took over during the first stages of Soviet Operation Bagration. Hoffmeister was in command when most of the German 9th Army, along with the XLI Panzer Corps, was encircled during the Bobruysk Offensive.

While Weidling was in command, XLI Panzer Corps was reportedly responsible for an atrocity committed by the Wehrmacht in the Soviet Union during the war. Up to 50,000 civilians were deliberately infected with typhus, and placed in a "typhus camp" in the area of Parichi, nowadays Belarus, in the path of oncoming Red Army forces, in the hopes that would cause a massive outbreak of typhus among the Red Army soldiers. That was noted by the commander of the 65th Soviet Army, General Pavel Batov, months later when it found itself facing the same corps in the Battle of Berlin.

The XLI Panzer Corps was rebuilt as part of the German 4th Army. The 4th Army, under the command of General Friedrich Hoßbach, was given the task of holding the borders of East Prussia. On 10 April 1945, Weidling was relieved of his command. He was thereafter appointed as commander of the LVI Panzer Corps.

The LVI Panzer Corps was part of Gotthard Heinrici's Army Group Vistula. As commander of that corps, Weidling began his involvement with the Battle of Berlin.

On 16 April 1945, Weidling prepared to take part in the Battle of the Seelow Heights, which was part of the broader Battle of the Oder-Neisse. Weidling's LVI Panzer Corps was in the centre, flanked by the CI Army Corps to his left and the XI SS Panzer Corps to his right. All three corps were part of General Theodor Busse's 9th Army, which was defending the heights above the River Oder. While all three corps were in generally good defensive positions, they were conspicuously short of tanks. Weidling's commander, Heinrici, recognised the shortage earlier in the day, as Hitler had ordered the transfer of three panzer divisions from Army Group Vistula to the command of recently promoted Field Marshal Ferdinand Schörner.

During the middle of the Battle of Berlin, the leader of the Hitler Youth, Artur Axmann, visited Weidling's headquarters and told him that the youngsters of the Hitler Youth were ready to fight and were even now manning the roads in the 56th rear. Weidling argued it was futile for the teenage boys to be thrown into the battle. He told Axmann that it was "the sacrifice of children for an already doomed cause". Axmann did not withdraw them from the battle.

By 19 April, with Schörner's Army Group Centre collapsing, Weidling's corps was forced to retreat west into Berlin. The German forces's retreat from Seelow Heights during the 19th and 20th left no front line remaining.

=== Commander of the Berlin Defence Area ===
On 22 April, upon receiving a report that Weidling had retreated in the face of advancing Soviet Army forces (contrary to standing orders), Hitler ordered that Weidling be executed by firing squad. In fact, Weidling had not retreated and the execution order was cancelled after he appeared at the Führerbunker to clear up the misunderstanding.

On 23 April, Hitler appointed Weidling as the commander of the Berlin Defence Area. Weidling replaced Lieutenant General (Generalleutnant) Helmuth Reymann, Colonel (Oberst) Ernst Kaether, and Hitler himself. Reymann had held the position only since March.

The forces available to Weidling for the city's defence included roughly 45,000 soldiers in several severely-depleted German Army and Waffen-SS divisions. These divisions were supplemented by the police force, boys in the compulsory Hitler Youth, and 40,000 men of the Volkssturm ('militia'). The commander of the central government district was SS-Brigadeführer Wilhelm Mohnke. Mohnke had been appointed to his position by Hitler and had over 2,000 men under his direct command. His core group were the 800 men of the Leibstandarte Adolf Hitler (LSSAH) SS battalion (assigned to guard Hitler). The Soviet command later estimated the number of defenders in Berlin at 180,000, but that was based on the number of German prisoners that they captured. The prisoners included many unarmed men in uniform, such as railway officials and members of the Reich Labour Service (Reichsarbeitsdienst).

Weidling organised the defences into eight sectors designated "A" through to "H". Each sector was commanded by a colonel or a general, but most of the colonels and generals had no combat experience. To the west of the city was the 20th Panzergrenadier Division. To the north was the 9th Fallschirmjäger Division, to the north-east the Panzer Division Müncheberg. To the south-east of the city and to the east of Tempelhof Airport was the SS-Nordland Panzergrenadier Division composed mainly of foreign volunteers. Weidling's reserve, the 18th Panzergrenadier Division was in Berlin's central district.

==== Bendlerblock headquarters ====
Sometime around 26 April, Weidling chose as his base of operations the old army headquarters on the Bendlerstrasse, the Bendlerblock. The location had well-equipped air-raid shelters and was close to the Reich Chancellery. In the depths of the Bendlerblock, Weidling's staff did not know whether it was day or night.

Around noon on 26 April, Weidling relieved Colonel Hans-Oscar Wöhlermann of command, and Major General Werner Mummert was reinstated as commander of the Müncheberg Panzer Division. Later that evening, Weidling presented Hitler with a detailed proposal for a breakout from Berlin. When Weidling finished, Hitler shook his head and said: "Your proposal is perfectly all right. But what is the point of it all? I have no intentions of wandering around in the woods. I am staying here and I will fall at the head of my troops. You, for your part, will carry on with your defence."

By the end of the day on 27 April, the encirclement of Berlin had been completed. The Soviet Information Bureau announced that Soviet troops of the 1st Belorussian Front had broken through strong German defences around Berlin and, approaching from the east and from the south, had linked up in Berlin and northwest of Potsdam and that the troops of the 1st Belorussian Front took Gartenstadt, Siemenstadt and the Goerlitzer Railway Station in eastern Berlin.

When Weidling discovered that a major part of the last line of the German defences in Berlin were manned by Hitler Youth, he ordered Artur Axmann to disband the Hitler Youth combat formations in the city. However, in the confusion, his order was never carried out.

==== Soviet advance ====
On 29 April, the Soviet Information Bureau announced that troops of the 1st Belorussian Front continued to clear the streets of Berlin, occupied the northwest sector of Charlottenburg as far as Bismarck Street, the west half of Moabit, and the eastern part of Schoeneberg. Soviet troops of the 1st Ukrainian Front occupied Friedenau and Grunewald in north and west Berlin.

During the evening of 29 April, Weidling's headquarters in the Bendlerblock was now within metres of the front line. Weidling discussed with his divisional commanders the possibility of breaking out to the southwest to link up with General Walther Wenck's 12th Army. Wenck's spearhead had reached the village of Ferch on the banks of the Schwielowsee near Potsdam. The breakout was planned to start the next night at 22:00.

On 30 April, the Soviet Information Bureau announced that Soviet troops of the 1st Belorussian Front had captured Moabit, Anhalter Railway Station, Joachimsthal to the north of Berlin, and Neukölln, Marienwerder and Liebenwalde. Troops of the 1st Ukrainian Front occupied the southern part of Wilmersdorf, Hohenzollerndamm and Halensee Railway Station.

==== The Führerbunker ====
Late in the morning of 30 April, with the Soviets less than 500 m from the bunker, Hitler had a meeting with Weidling, who informed him that the Berlin garrison would probably run out of ammunition that night. Weidling asked Hitler for permission to break out, a request that he had earlier made unsuccessfully. Hitler did not answer at first, and Weidling went back to his headquarters in the Bendlerblock, where at about 13:00, he received Hitler's permission to try a breakout that night.

After Hitler and Braun's suicides, Weidling reached the Führerbunker and was met by Joseph Goebbels, Reichsleiter Martin Bormann and General Hans Krebs. They took him to Hitler's room, where the couple had committed suicide. They told him that their bodies had been burned and buried in a shell crater in the Reich Chancellery garden above. Weidling was forced to swear that he would not repeat this news to anybody. The only person in the outside world who was to be informed was Joseph Stalin. An attempt would be made that night to arrange an armistice, and General Krebs would inform the Soviet commander so that he could inform the Kremlin.

Weidling telephoned Colonel Hans Refior, his civil chief-of-staff, in the Bendlerblock headquarters soon afterward. Weidling said that he could not tell him what had happened, but he needed various members of his staff to join him immediately, including Colonel Theodor von Dufving, his military chief-of-staff.

The meeting on 1 May between Krebs, who had been sent by Goebbels, and Soviet Lieutenant General Vasily Chuikov ended with no agreement. According to Hitler's personal secretary Traudl Junge, Krebs returned to the bunker complex looking "worn out, exhausted". The surrender of Berlin was thus delayed until Goebbels committed suicide, after which it was left up to Weidling to negotiate with the Soviets.

=== Surrender to Chuikov ===
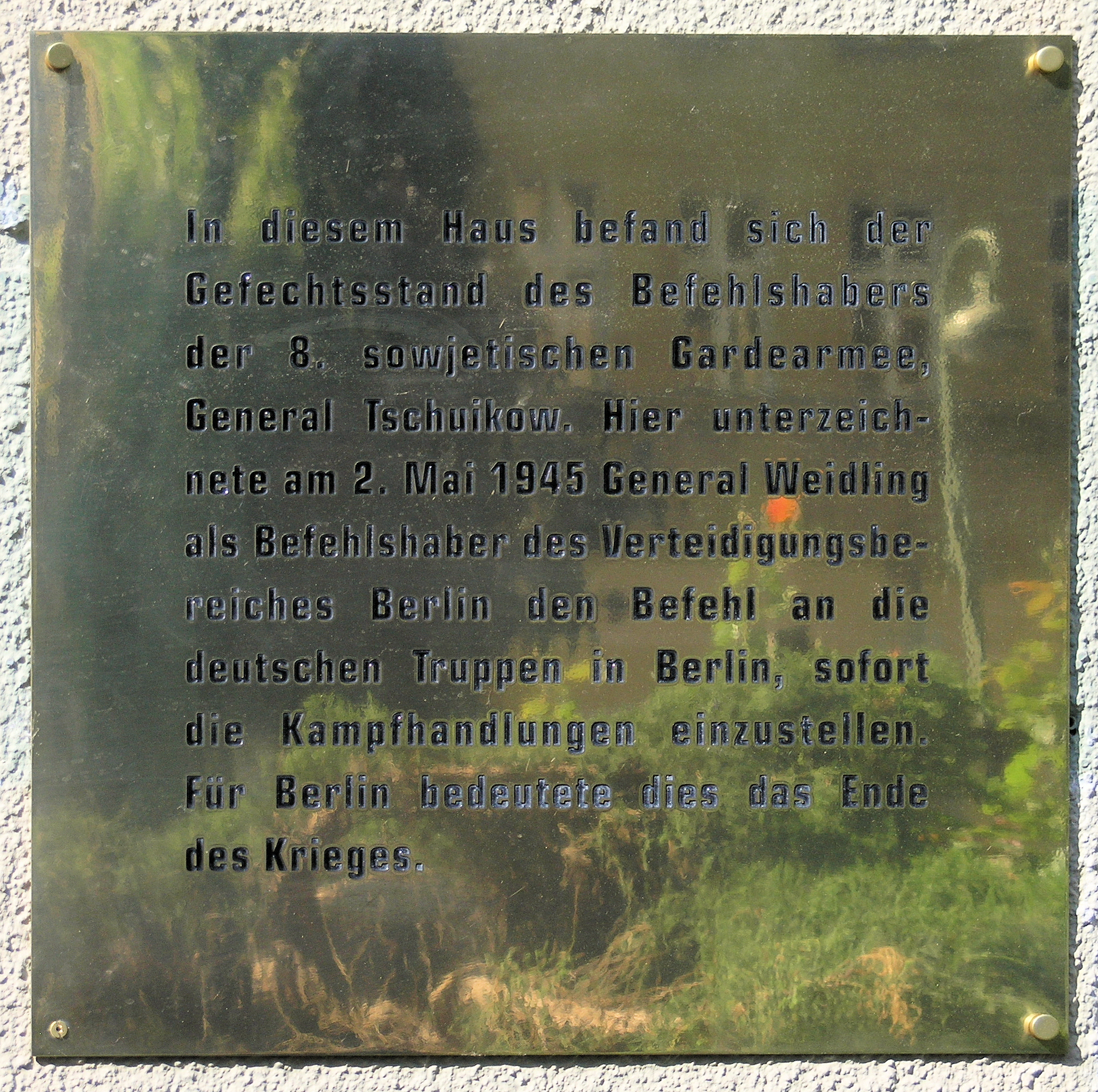
Memorial plaque commemorating the capitulation in Berlin. "This building was the headquarters of Marshal Chuikov, commander of the Soviet 8th Guards Army. Here, on May 2, 1945, General Weidling, as commander of the Berlin Defence Area, signed the order for all German forces in Berlin to cease hostilities immediately. For Berlin, this meant the end of the war."

On 2 May, Weidling had his Chief-of-Staff, Theodor von Dufving, arrange a meeting with Chuikov. Weidling told the Soviets about the suicides of Hitler and Goebbels, and Chuikov demanded complete capitulation.

Pursuant to Chuikov and Vasily Sokolovsky's direction, Weidling put his surrender order in writing. The document, written by Weidling, read as follows:

On 30 April 1945, the Führer committed suicide, and thus abandoned those who had sworn loyalty to him. According to the Führer's order, you German soldiers would have had to go on fighting for Berlin despite the fact that our ammunition has run out and despite the general situation which makes our further resistance meaningless. I order the immediate cessation of resistance. Every hour you keep on fighting prolongs the suffering of the civilians in Berlin and of our wounded. Together with the commander-in-chief of the Soviet forces I order you to stop fighting immediately. WEIDLING, General of Artillery, former District Commandant in the defence of Berlin

The meeting between Weidling and Chuikov ended at 8:23 am on 2 May 1945.

== Imprisonment and death ==
The Soviet forces took Weidling into custody and flew him to the Soviet Union. Initially, he was held in the Butyrka and Lefortovo Prisons in Moscow. On 27 February 1952, the Military Collegium of the Supreme Court of the Soviet Union sentenced him to 25 years' imprisonment for war crimes committed in the occupied Soviet Union. Weidling died on 17 November 1955 in the custody of the KGB in Vladimir of an apparent heart attack. He was buried in an unmarked grave at the cemetery of Vladimir Central Prison. On 16 April 1996, the Chief Military Prosecutor's Office of the Russian Federation declared Weidling non-rehabilitative.

== Awards ==
- Knight's Cross of the House Order of Hohenzollern with swords
- Iron Cross (1914) 2nd and 1st class
- Military Merit Cross of Austria-Hungary, 3rd class with war decoration
- Airship Crew Commemorative Badge
- Honour Cross of the World War 1914/1918
- Clasp to the Iron Cross 2nd and 1st class
- German Cross in Gold on 23 June 1942 as Generalmajor and commander of 86. Infanterie Division
- Knight's Cross of the Iron Cross with Oak Leaves and Swords
  - Knight's Cross on 15 January 1943 as Generalmajor and commander of 86. Infanterie Division
  - Oak Leaves on 22 February 1944 as General der Artillerie commander of XLI. Panzerkorps
  - Swords on 21 January 1945 as General der Artillerie and commander of XLI. Panzerkorps

Military offices
Preceded by Generaloberst Josef Harpe	Commander of XXXXI Panzerkorps; 15 October 1943 – 19 June 1944	Succeeded by Generalleutnant Edmund Hoffmeister
Preceded by Generalleutnant Edmund Hoffmeister	Commander of XXXXI Panzerkorps; 1 July 1944 – 10 April 1945	Succeeded by Generalleutnant Wend von Wietersheim
Preceded by General der Kavallerie Rudolf Koch-Erpach	Commander of LVI Panzer Corps; 10 April – 2 May 1945	Germany defeated
Preceded by Ernst Kaether	Commander of the Berlin Defense Area; 22 April – 2 May 1945	Berlin captured by Soviet forces
