= Rudolf Koch-Erpach =

German general during World War II

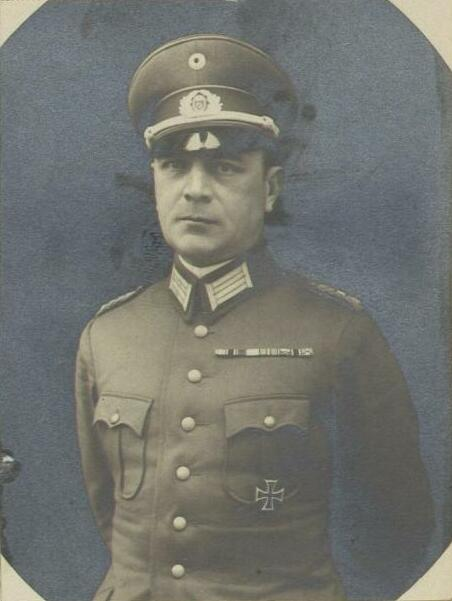
- Born: 9 April 1886; Munich, Bavaria, German Empire
- Died: 27 November 1971 (aged 85); Bad Boll
- Military career
- Allegiance: German Empire; Weimar Republic; Nazi Germany
- Branch: German Army
- Service years: 1904–1945
- Rank: General der Kavellerie
- Commands: 8th Jäger Division; LVI Panzer Corps; 1st Army
- Conflicts: World War I; World War II; Invasion of Poland; Battle of Krasnobród; Battle of France; Vistula–Oder Offensive
- Awards: Knight's Cross of the Iron Cross

Rudolf Koch-Erpach (9 April 1886 – 28 November 1971) was a German general during World War II who commanded the LVI Panzer Corps and the 1st Army.

== Biography ==
Koch-Erpach was born in Munich, and eventually rose to the rank of general. In 1939, he commanded the German 8th Infantry Division during the invasion of Poland. On 24 June 1940, after the Battle of France he was awarded a Knight's Cross of the Iron Cross. From 1 November 1940 to 1 March 1941, Koch-Erpach commanded the German LX Corps. After a short break, he briefly commanded the XXXV Corps from 1 April 1941 to 1 May 1941.

Koch-Erpach commanded Military District VIII from 1 May 1942 to 26 January 1945. The headquarters for this military district was Breslau and the district included Silesia, Sudetenland, parts of Moravia, and parts of southwestern Poland. Military District VIII ceased operations in February 1945. From 26 January 1945 to 10 April 1945, Koch-Erpach commanded the LVI Panzer Corps. Later in 1945, Koch-Erpach was acting commander of the German 1st Army for two days before the war ended, from 6 May to 8 May. He died in Bad Boll.

== Awards and decorations ==
- Knight's Cross of the Iron Cross on 24 June 1940 as Generalleutnant and commander of 8 Infanterie-Division

Military offices
Preceded by None	Commander of 8. Infanterie-Division; 15 October 1935 – 25 October 1940	Succeeded by General der Infanterie Gustav Höhne
Preceded by General der Infanterie Max von Schenckendorff	Commander of XXXV Army Corps; 1 April 1941 - 1 May 1941	Succeeded by General der Artillerie Rudolf Kämpfe
Preceded by General der Infanterie Johannes Block	Commander of LVI Panzer Corps; 26 January 1945 – 10 April 1945	Succeeded by General der Artillerie Helmuth Weidling
Preceded by General der Infanterie Hermann Foertsch	Commander of 1. Armee; 6 May 1945 – 8 May 1945	Succeeded by None
