= Siegfried Knappe =

German writer and Army officer during WWII (1917–2008)

- Born: 15 January 1917; Brunsbuettel, Germany
- Died: 1 December 2008 (aged 91); Cincinnati, Ohio, U.S.
- Military career
- Allegiance: Nazi Germany
- Branch: Army
- Service years: 1936–45
- Rank: Major
- Conflicts: World War II: Annexation of the Sudetenland; Battle of France; Operation Barbarossa; Battle of Moscow; Italian Campaign; Siege of Breslau; Battle of Berlin
- Awards: Iron Cross

Siegfried Knappe (15 January 1917 – 1 December 2008) was an officer in the German Army (Heer) during World War II. Towards the end of the war, Knappe was stationed in Berlin, where he gave daily briefings at the Führerbunker.

== Biography ==
As a young artillery lieutenant (Leutnant der Artillerie) in Panzer Group Kleist, Siegfried Knappe participated in the Invasion of France. Knappe was decorated for actions that took place on the night of 14 June 1940. The actions took place in the Paris area, south of Tremblay-en-France, at the Ourcq canal. A group of French sailors had apparently not been informed of the decision to declare Paris an open city. As a result, they were defending a bridge with machine guns from a house across the canal. After German infantry failed to clear the area with mortar fire, artillery support was requested.

Although Knappe was the Battalion Adjutant and it was not his duty to man the gun, he moved up to the front with the infantry. Because the area was wooded, the 105 mm gun had to be brought up and fired almost at point blank range directly into the house. The German infantry was hidden behind a building by the bridge, where the gun was maneuvered, but in order to fire all seven crew members would be exposed to machine gun fire. On the mark, the gun was moved, aimed, and fired. Three of the seven crew members were wounded but the machine gun nest was destroyed. This action opened the road for the infantry.

Knappe was wounded by a bullet entering the back of his hand and exiting through his wrist. On 19 June 1940, he was evacuated. For his bravery, Knappe received the Iron Cross 2nd Class. He also received the Black Wound Badge for his wounds.

He went on to fight on the Eastern Front and the Italian Campaign. While participating in the invasion of the Soviet Union in 1941, he received the Iron Cross 1st class for his bravery, in particular for leading artillery attacks from forward positions.

Knappe was also wounded an additional three times in the course of his career. After attending General Staff College, he rose to the rank of Major. Knappe ended the war fighting in Berlin while a member of General Helmuth Weidling's staff.

== Post-war ==
After five years of captivity in the Soviet Union, Knappe was released to West Germany in 1949. Knappe immigrated to the United States with his wife, Lieselotte ("Lilo"; nee Brecht), who died in 2002, and their children, and settled in Ohio. There he wrote his memoir, Soldat. (Soldat is German for soldier.)

== In media ==
The Oscar-nominated film Downfall (2004), about German dictator Adolf Hitler's last days, was based in part on Knappe's memoirs. He is also portrayed in the movie Downfall, as the adjutant to General Weidling.

== Awards and decorations ==
- Sudetenland Medal
- Wound Badge (1939)
  - in Black
  - in Silver
- Iron Cross (1939)
  - 2nd Class
  - 1st Class
- General Assault Badge
- Eastern Front Medal
