= Groß Laasch =

- Municipality
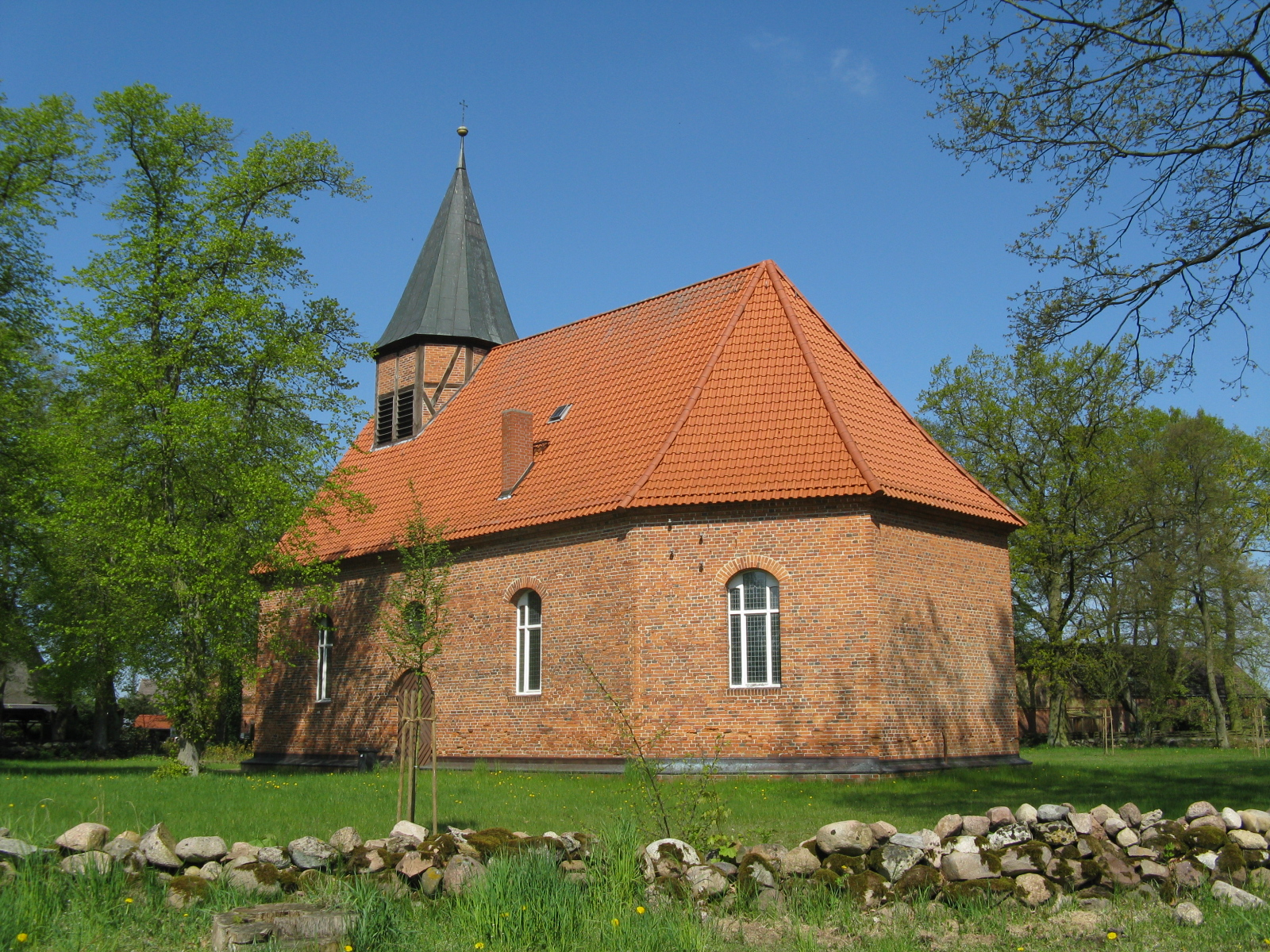
- Village church in Groß Laasch

- Location of Groß Laasch within Ludwigslust-Parchim district
- Interactive map of Groß Laasch
- Location within Germany Location within Mecklenburg-Vorpommern
- Coordinates: 53°20′N 11°33′E
- Country: Germany
- State: Mecklenburg-Vorpommern
- District: Ludwigslust-Parchim
- Municipal assoc.: Ludwigslust-Land

Government
  - Mayor: Markus Lau

Area
  - Total: 27.22 km^{2} (10.51 sq mi)
- Elevation: 37 m (121 ft)

Population (2025-12-31)
  - Total: 931
  - Density: 34.2/km^{2} (88.6/sq mi)
- Time zone: UTC+01:00 (CET)
  - Summer (DST): UTC+02:00 (CEST)
- Postal codes: 19288
- Dialling codes: 03874
- Vehicle registration: LWL
- Website: www.amt-ludwigslust-land.de

Groß Laasch is a municipality in the Ludwigslust-Parchim district, in Mecklenburg-Vorpommern, Germany.

== Notable people ==
- Adolf Hamann (1885–1945), German Nazi officer executed for war crimes
- Horst Metz (1945–2022), politician
