= Horst Metz =

German politician (1945–2022)

- Born: 6 July 1945; Groß Laasch, Mecklenburg, Allied-occupied Germany
- Died: 15 October 2022 (aged 77); Dresden, Saxony, Germany
- Occupation: Politician
- Political party: CDU
- Children: Georg Metz

Horst Metz (6 July 1945 – 15 October 2022) was a German politician.

In 2002 he was appointed Finance Minister in the Saxony regional government. His resignation from ministerial office came unexpectedly in 2007, following a crisis involving a regional bank that had needed a bailout because of large-scale poorly timed investments in the US housing market.

== Life ==
=== Early years ===
Metz was born in a small village in northern central Germany some 35 km (20 miles) south of Schwerin, approximately two months after the end of the Second World War. By the time of his birth, the entire region had been incorporated into the post-war Soviet occupation zone which in October 1949 would become the German Democratic Republic, sponsored by the Soviet Union and in most respects operating under Soviet-style political and administrative institutions. After passing his School Final Exams in 1964, Horst Metz trained as a hydraulic engineer. Between 1965 and 1970, he studied at the Dresden University of Technology. He then undertook further research, obtaining his doctorate in 1972.

=== Professional career ===
In 1972, Metz moved south and worked until 1987 as a researcher with the Elbe Waterways and Shipping Office in Dresden. In 1987 he took over as departmental head at the VEB Water Supply and Waste water treatment Service (WAB) in Dresden. In 1990 he took a job with the District Administration as Head of the Environmental Protection Department.

=== Politics ===
During the eleven months between November 1989 when the Berlin Wall was breached by protestors (without triggering lethal reactions from Soviet troops or East German border guards) and October 1990, when German reunification was formally enacted, the German Democratic Republic underwent a remarkable and rapid transition from single- party dictatorship to conventional "western"-style democracy. The period saw the country's first (and, as a stand-alone state, last) national free election, and it also saw a sustained attack on perceived abuses by individuals working for the state during the preceding decades. In the Saxon capital, Dresden, Metz was appointed in December 1989 to lead an enquiry into Abuses of Office and Corruption in Dresden. The enquiry sat till May 1990, and Metz evidently emerged more widely known and with his own reputation enhanced. By March 1990, he had joined the Christian Democratic Union (CDU) which, after more than four decades as a small SED-controlled Bloc party had been resurrected to contest that month's election. He became deputy chairman of the regional party in Saxony. In October 1990, the month when German reunification formally took place, regional elections were held. The old "single-list" electoral system that had been "normal" until 1989 had been abandoned: each of the major parties now submitted its own list of candidates to the electorate. On 14 October 1990, in Saxony, the CDU won 53.8% of the overall votes cast which entitled it to 92 seats in the new Landtag. Within the electoral district in which he stood, the name of Horst Metz was high enough up on the party list to ensure him a seat in the regional legislature. He retained his seat until 2009.

In October 1999, he became deputy leader of the CDU group in the Saxony regional legislature. In April 2002, there occurred a leadership coup within the majority faction in the Saxony Regional government, as a result of which Georg Milbradt took over both as regional party leader and regional Minister-President from Kurt Biedenkopf. Milbradt had previously served in the Biedenkopf cabinet as regional finance minister, and that was the position which he now passed to Metz. In the 2004 regional election the CDU lost their overall majority for the first time since reunification and Milbradt found himself obliged to govern in coalition with a moderate left-wing party. Metz nevertheless retained his Finance portfolio.

=== Ministerial resignation triggered by a bank crisis ===
The Saxony Regional State Bank (Landesbank Sachsen) was founded in 1992 following reunification. It was broadly based on equivalent existing institutions in what had before 1990 been known as West Germany. The bank was in part publicly owned, since the Free State of Saxony owned 37% of it. Prominently associated with the Saxony bank's creation was the regional politician Georg Milbradt, who by 2002 had taken over in Saxony as the head of the regional government.

As the regional Finance Minister of Saxony from 2002, Horst Metz also sat as chairman of the bank's supervisory board. On one occasion he intervened to issue a board decree restricting expenditure on company cars supplied by the bank to its directors after the bank president (up till 2005) Michael Weiss had arranged for the bank to finance his Mercedes S600 and its elaborate tow bar, fitted in order to support his water sports habit. This was not the only example of executive profligacy that would attract criticism from auditors and from the press in reports produced after the bank met its nemesis, although Metz himself seems to have been an advocate for restraint in such matters.

Like many bankers around the world during the early years of the twenty-first century, senior officers at the Saxony Regional State Bank were tempted into international expansion, which in this case involved poorly timed investment in a Dublin based subsidiary called "Sachsen LB Europe plc". The Dublin subsidiary in turn became part of a channel leading, ultimately, to the US housing market which the bank officers involved evidently saw as a one-way bet: when the US housing market declined during the 2008 financial crisis the Saxony Regional Bank faced bankruptcy. It fell to the regional government to sort out the mess. The Saxony Regional Bank was taken over early during 2008 by the Baden-Württemberg Regional State Bank (Landesbank Baden-Württemberg) as part of a large and complex deal which also involved the taxpayers of Saxony, represented by their regional government, providing a guarantee worth 2.75 Billion Euros.

The close links between the bank and the regional government, along with his own position on the bank's supervisory board, meant that Horst Metz's resignation as regional finance minister, on 30 September 2007, was widely reported in Germany as honorable, but nevertheless appropriate. Following his resignation as Finance Minister, however, Horst Metz would continue to defend the decisions he had taken to save the bank, and the way in which it was done.

After 19 years in the Landtag, as criticisms continued to surface in the aftermath of the bank collapse, he did not contest his seat again in the 2009 state election.

=== Personal life and death ===
Metz died on 15 October 2022, at age 77.
