= Rudolf Kaempfe =

German general (1883–1962)

- Born: 10 April 1883; Moscow, Russian Empire
- Died: 23 December 1962 (aged 79); Stuttgart, Kingdom of Württemberg, German Empire
- Military career
- Allegiance: German Empire (to 1918); Weimar Republic (to 1933); Nazi Germany
- Branch: Imperial German Army; Reichswehr; Army (Wehrmacht)
- Service years: 1902–1945
- Rank: General der Artillerie
- Commands: 31st Infantry Division; XXXV Army Corps
- Conflicts: World War I World War II: Invasion of Poland; Battle of France; Operation Barbarossa; Battle of Białystok–Minsk; Battle of Kiev (1941); Battle of Moscow
- Awards: German Cross, in gold Clasp to the Iron Cross, 2nd and 1st class

Rudolf Kaempfe (10 April 1883 – 23 December 1962) was a German career military officer who served in both world wars. As a general during World War II , he held commands at the division and corps level. He was arrested by the Gestapo in connection with the July 20 plot to assassinate Adolf Hitler. At the end of the war, he was captured by the Red Army and held in captivity until 1949.

== World War I and interwar years ==
Kaempfe was born in 1883 at Moscow and joined the Royal Prussian Army in 1902. He fought in World War I on the western front and in Serbia. At the end of the war, he was an Hauptmann serving as the chief of operations on the staff of the 195th Infantry Regiment and had been awarded both classes of the Iron Cross and other decorations. He remained in the post-war Reichswehr and served in artillery commands and staff positions. He was promoted to Generalmajor in October 1935 and was Artillery Commander 8 from April 1935 to April 1937. At that time, he was given command of the 31st Infantry Division, and was promoted to Generalleutnant in January 1938.

== World War II ==
Kaempfe led his division in the Invasion of Poland and the Battle of France. In May 1941, he became the commander of the Höheres Kommando z.b.V. XXXV, in January 1942 renamed as XXXV Army Corps. At the beginning of the summer of 1941, he participated with his corps in the invasion of the Soviet Union along the central Russian front. On 1 July 1941, he was promoted to General der Artillerie. On 19 December 1941, he was awarded the German Cross in gold. In September 1942, he was removed from his command and was assigned to the Führerreserve.

In connection with the assassination attempt on Hitler of 20 July 1944, Kaempfe was arrested on 21 July 1944 by the Gestapo and imprisoned. When the war ended in May 1945, he was not liberated, but was taken captive by the Red Army and deported to the Soviet Union. He was released from captivity in the autumn of 1949 and returned to Germany.

== Awards and decorations ==
- Knight's Cross of the House Order of Hohenzollern with swords
- Iron Cross (1914), 2nd and 1st class
- Hanseatic Cross of Hamburg
- Wound Badge in black
- Military Merit Cross of Austria-Hungary, 3rd class with war decoration
- Honour Cross of the World War 1914/1918
- German Cross in gold
- Clasp to the Iron Cross, 2nd and 1st class

== Sources ==
- Lexikon der wehrmacht.de
- Feldgrau
- Webb, James Jack (2024). Generals and Admirals of the Third Reich: For Country or Fuehrer. Vol. 2: H–O. Havertown, PA: Casemate Publishers. ISBN 978-1-952-71517-4.

Military offices
| Preceded by None | Commander of 31st Infantry Division; 1 April 1937 – 22 May 1941 | Succeeded by Generalmajor Kurt Kalmuekoff |
| Preceded by General der Kavallerie Rudolf Koch-Erpach | Commander of XXXV Army Corps; 22 May 1941 – 19 June 1942 | Succeeded by Generalleutnant Edgar Theißen |
| Preceded by Generalleutnant Edgar Theißen | Commander of XXXV Army Corps; 13 August 1942 – 1 November 1942 | Succeeded by Generaloberst Lothar Rendulic |
