= 383rd Infantry Division =

- German: 383. Infanterie-Division
- Active: 26 January 1942–3 August 1944
- Country: Nazi Germany
- Branch: Army
- Type: Infantry
- Size: Division
- Engagements: Battle of Kursk; Operation Bagration

Commanders
- Notable commanders: Edmund Hoffmeister

The 383rd Infantry Division was formed during the winter of 1941/42, as part of the 18th wave. All infantry divisions of this wave, numbers 383 to 389, were referred to as “Rhine Gold” divisions.

After its formation, the division was transferred to the Eastern Front in April 1942.
The division was first integrated into the 2nd Army of Army Group B. In March 1943 it joined the 9th Army of Army Group Center with which it took part in Operation Citadel (Battle of Kursk).

When the Soviets launched Operation Bagration on 23 June 1944, The division was surrounded during the Babruysk Offensive and destroyed.

During the crisis of leadership experienced by the German 9th Army on 27 June 1944 in regards to the feasibility and authorization of German withdrawals from the Babruysk–Mogilev–Vitebsk sector, the 383rd Infantry Division was eventually chosen by Adolf Hitler to be the formation designated to stay behind in the Babruysk encirclement, tasked to hold the town as long as possible while other German forces were allowed to attempt a breakout.

It was officially dissolved on 3 August 1944.

== Commanders ==
- Generalleutnant Johannes Haarde (26 January 1942 – March 1942)
- Generalmajor Eberhard von Fabrice (March 1942 – November 1942)
- Generalleutnant Friedrich-Wilhelm John (November 1942 – July 1943)
- Generalmajor Edmund Hoffmeister (1 July 1943 - 20 June 1944)
- Generalleutnant Adolf Hamann (20 June 1944 - 28 June 1944) : POW.

== Sources ==
- Lexikon der Wehrmacht
- axis history
- Tessin, Georg (1975). "Die Landstreitkräfte 371—500". Verbände und Truppen der deutschen Wehrmacht und Waffen SS im Zweiten Weltkrieg 1939—1945 (in German). Vol. 10. Osnabrück: Biblio. pp. 34–35.
