= Kurt-Jürgen Freiherr von Lützow =

- Born: 7 August 1892; Marienwerder, German Empire
- Died: 20 July 1961 (aged 68); Hannover, Germany
- Military career
- Allegiance: German Empire; Weimar Republic; Nazi Germany
- Branch: Army
- Service years: 1914–1945
- Rank: Generalleutnant
- Commands: 12th Infantry Division
- Conflicts: World War I World War II: Bobruysk Offensive
- Awards: Knight's Cross of the Iron Cross with Oak Leaves

Kurt-Jürgen Freiherr von Lützow (7 August 1892 – 20 July 1961) was a German general during World War II and recipient of the Knight's Cross of the Iron Cross with Oak Leaves, awarded by Nazi Germany for successful military leadership.

Lützow was born near Marienwerder. He surrendered to the Red Army in the course of the Soviet 1944 Operation Bagration in an encirclement near Bobruisk. In Moscow on 29 June 1950, he was sentenced to 25 years in prison for war crimes. In January 1956, he was released from prison and repatriated.

== Awards ==
- Iron Cross (1914) 2nd Class (29 September 1914) & 1st Class (16 March 1916)
- Clasp to the Iron Cross (1939) 2nd Class (14 September 1939) & 1st Class (13 October 1939)
- Knight's Cross of the Iron Cross with Oak Leaves
  - Knight's Cross on 15 August 1940 as Oberst and commander of the Infanterie-Regiment 89
  - 37th Oak Leaves on 21 October 1941 as Oberst and commander of the Infanterie-Regiment 89

Military offices
Preceded by Oberst Karl Hernekamp	Commander of 12. Infanterie-Division; 1 March 1942 – 31 May 1942	Succeeded by Oberst Gerhard Müller
Preceded by Oberst Wilhelm Lorenz	Commander of 12. Infanterie-Division; 20 July 1942 – 25 June 1944	Succeeded by Generalleutnant Kurt Jahn
Preceded by General der Infanterie Friedrich Wiese	Commander of XXXV. Armeekorps; 25 June 1944 – July 1944	Succeeded by None
