= Panzer Division Müncheberg =

- Panzer Division Muncheberg Insignia
- Active: 8 March – 9 May 1945
- Country: Nazi Germany
- Branch: Army
- Type: Panzer
- Role: Armoured warfare
- Size: Division
- Engagements: World War II

Commanders
- Notable commanders: Werner Mummert

Panzer-Division Müncheberg was a German panzer division which saw action on the Eastern Front around Berlin during World War II.

== History ==
=== Formation ===
Panzer-Division Müncheberg began forming on 8 March 1945 in Müncheberg, Germany. The majority of the division's staff and panzer troops were drawn from the 103rd Panzer Brigade, which had been dissolved three days before; the brigade's commander, Major General Werner Mummert, was placed in command of the division.

The Müncheberg Division received several Ausf. G Panther tanks equipped with Sperber Infrared (IR) systems, as well as a company of Panzergrenadiers equipped with Sperber IR systems. The division received several Jagdtigers, as well as several Tiger IIs, and the last five Tiger Is to be sent to the front. By 12 March the division's strength was 6,836 men. On 18 March the men from an infantry battalion of the 1st SS Panzer Division Leibstandarte SS Adolf Hitler were used to bolster the division's strength.

As the advancing Soviet forces neared Müncheberg, the partly formed Müncheberg Division was ordered to move east as the mobile reserve for the 9th Army, which was part of Army Group Vistula.

=== Küstrin and Seelow Heights ===
The town of Küstrin lies roughly 70 km to the east of Berlin. Adolf Hitler had declared that the town was to be a fortress (Festung). Unlike other so-called fortress towns and cities, Festung Küstrin was indeed a fortress. The forces of Marshal Vasily Chuikov had reached the outskirts of Küstrin on 31 January and attempted to secure a bridgehead across the Oder. Bridgeheads were established to the north and south of Küstrin, but the Soviet forces could not consolidate their bridgehead until Küstrin was captured. Chuikov's forces, hesitant to attack the well-defended fortress, began attempts to surround Küstrin.

Despite repeated Soviet attacks, the narrow strip of land between Busse's 9th Army and Küstrin, dubbed the Küstrin Corridor, was kept open. On 22 March a major Soviet effort to sever the corridor went into action. The Soviet plan consisted of an inner and outer encirclement. The inner encirclement succeeded quickly, and the corridor was cut. Müncheberg went into action on 22 March alongside XXXIX Panzer Corps. By 25 March the outer encirclement was completed, trapping several German units including a platoon from the Müncheberg.

On 27 March, the Germans launched a counter-offensive aimed at re-opening the Küstrin Corridor. Müncheberg was subordinated to XXXIX Panzer Corps for the attack. The corps was unable to break through to the city. A Soviet counter-attack hit the 20th Panzergrenadier Division and soon the attack was in disarray, with elements of the 20th falling back in a disorganised rout. After the failure of the Küstrin counter-attack, Müncheberg was pulled out of the line to be refitted.

On 16 April the Red Army launched an offensive operation across the Alte Oder aimed at capturing Berlin. From this date until the end of the war, Müncheberg was in constant combat. On 20 April Müncheberg, together with its neighboring formation 11th SS Volunteer Grenadier Division Nordland fell back into Berlin itself.

=== Berlin ===
The division was pushed back into Berlin itself by the advancing Soviet forces. The remnants of the Müncheberg were positioned in the north-eastern sector of Berlin, north of the River Spree. By this stage, the division retained roughly a dozen tanks and about thirty halftracks.

On 25 April, General Helmuth Weidling, the recently appointed commander of the defence of Berlin, ordered Mummert to take command of the LVI Panzer Corps, command of the Müncheberg being handed over to Colonel Hans-Oscar Wöhlermann, the artillery commander (ArKo) for the city. On 26 April Müncheberg, along with Nordland, was ordered to attack towards Tempelhof Airport and Neukolln. With its last ten panzers, the Müncheberg initially made progress, but several local Soviet counter-attacks soon halted the advance.

Around noon on 26 April Wöhlermann was released from command and Mummert was reinstated as commander of the division. The following is from the diary of an officer with the Müncheberg Division and describes the evening of 26 April.

Scarlet night. Heavy artillery fire. Uncanny silence. We get shot at from many houses. Foreign workers, no doubt. From the Air Ministry comes news that General Erich Bärenfänger has been relieved of his post of commander of the Berlin garrison. One hour later we hear that General Weidling is our new commander. General Mummert takes charge of the Tank Corps...

On 27 April, very early in the morning, Hitler ordered the flooding of the Berlin underground to slow the advancing Red Army. Hitler's order resulted in the drowning of many German soldiers and civilians who had taken refuge in the tunnels. The diary of the officer with the Müncheberg Division went on to describe the flooding.

New command post: Anhalter subway station. Platforms and control rooms look like an armed camp. Women and children huddle in niches and corners. Others sit about in deck chairs. They all listen for the sounds of battle... Suddenly water starts to pour into the station. Screams, sobs, curses. People fighting around the ladders that run through the air shafts up to the streets. Masses of gurgling water rush over the stairs. Children and wounded are abandoned and trampled to death. The water rises three feet or more and then slowly goes down. The panic lasts for hours. Many are drowned. Reason: On somebody's orders, engineers have blasted the locks of the canal between Schoeneburg and Mockern Bridges to flood the tunnels against the advancing Russians. Meanwhile heavy fighting has been going on above ground level. Change of position to Potsdamer Platz subway station in the late afternoon. Command post on the first floor, as tunnels still under water. Direct hits on the roof. Heavy losses among wounded and civilians. Smoke pours in through the shell holes. Outside, stacks of Panzerfausts go up in the air. Another direct hit, one flight below street level. A horrible sight: Men, soldiers, women, and children are literally glued to the wall.

See also History of the Berlin U-Bahn

As the division fought in Wilmersdorf, the encirclement of Berlin was completed and the remnants of the Müncheberg were trapped. The diary of the officer with the Müncheberg Division also described the "flying courts-martial" prevalent at this time:

Flying courts-martial unusually prominent today. Most of them very young SS officers. Hardly a decoration among them. Blind and fanatical. The hope of relief and the fear of these courts bring men back to the fighting. General Mummert refuses to allow any further courts-martial in the sector under his command... He is determined to shoot down personally any courts-martial that appears... We cannot hold the Potsdamer Platz and move through the subway tunnel to Nollendorferplatz. In the tunnel next to ours, the Russians are advancing in the opposite direction.

On 30 April, Hitler committed suicide. The Müncheberg, 18th Panzergrenadier Division along with a few Tiger IIs from SS Heavy Panzer Battalion 103 were engaged in heavy fighting near the Westkreuz and Halensee train stations and on the Kurfurstendamm. By 1 May the division had been pushed back to the Tiergarten and was fighting to defend the Zoo Flak Tower, the shelter of thousands of civilians. The Müncheberg's last operating panzer, a Tiger 1, was abandoned on the Unter den Linden straße a hundred metres from the Brandenburg Gate.

The division, together with the remnants of 18th Panzergrenadier, attempted to escape Berlin to the west, to surrender to the Americans. On 3 May the divisions had reached a crossing over the Havel River in Spandau, under fire by the Red Army. Those who made it across the bridge found that they were surrounded by the Soviet forces; on the same day, the division ceased to exist.

== Commanders ==
- Generalmajor der Reserve Werner Mummert (9 Mar 1945 – 25 Apr 1945)
- Oberst Hans-Oscar Wöhlermann (25 Apr 1945 – 26 Apr 1945)
- Generalmajor der Reserve Werner Mummert (26 Apr 1945 – 4 May 1945)

== Order of battle ==
- 1st Müncheberg Panzer Grenadier Regiment
- 2nd Müncheberg Panzer Grenadier Regiment
- Kummersdorf Panzer Battalion
- Müncheberg Panzer Artillery Regiment
- Müncheberg Panzer Reconnaissance Company
- Müncheberg Panzerjäger Company
- Müncheberg Pioneer Company
- Müncheberg Signals Company
