= XXXXI Panzer Corps =

XXXXI Panzerkorps
- Unit insignia
- Active: 5 February 1940 - 7 May 1945
- Country: Nazi Germany
- Branch: Army
- Type: Panzer corps
- Role: Armoured warfare
- Size: Corps
- Engagements: World War II

Commanders
- Notable commanders: See Commanders

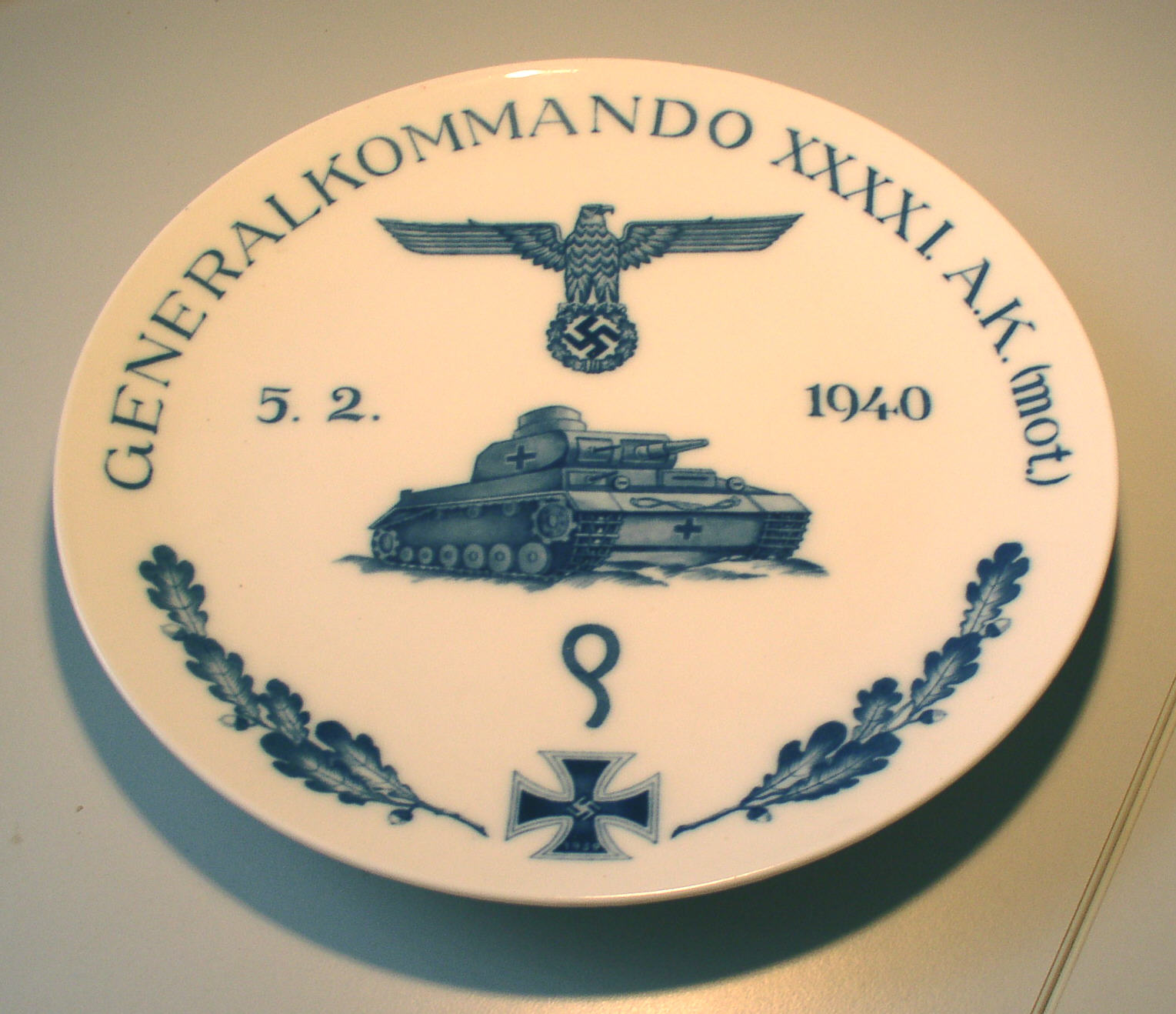
Commemorative plate of the XXXXI Armeekorps (mot)

XXXXI Panzer Corps (also written as: XLI Panzer Corps) was a Panzer (armoured) corps in the German Army during World War II.

== Operational history ==
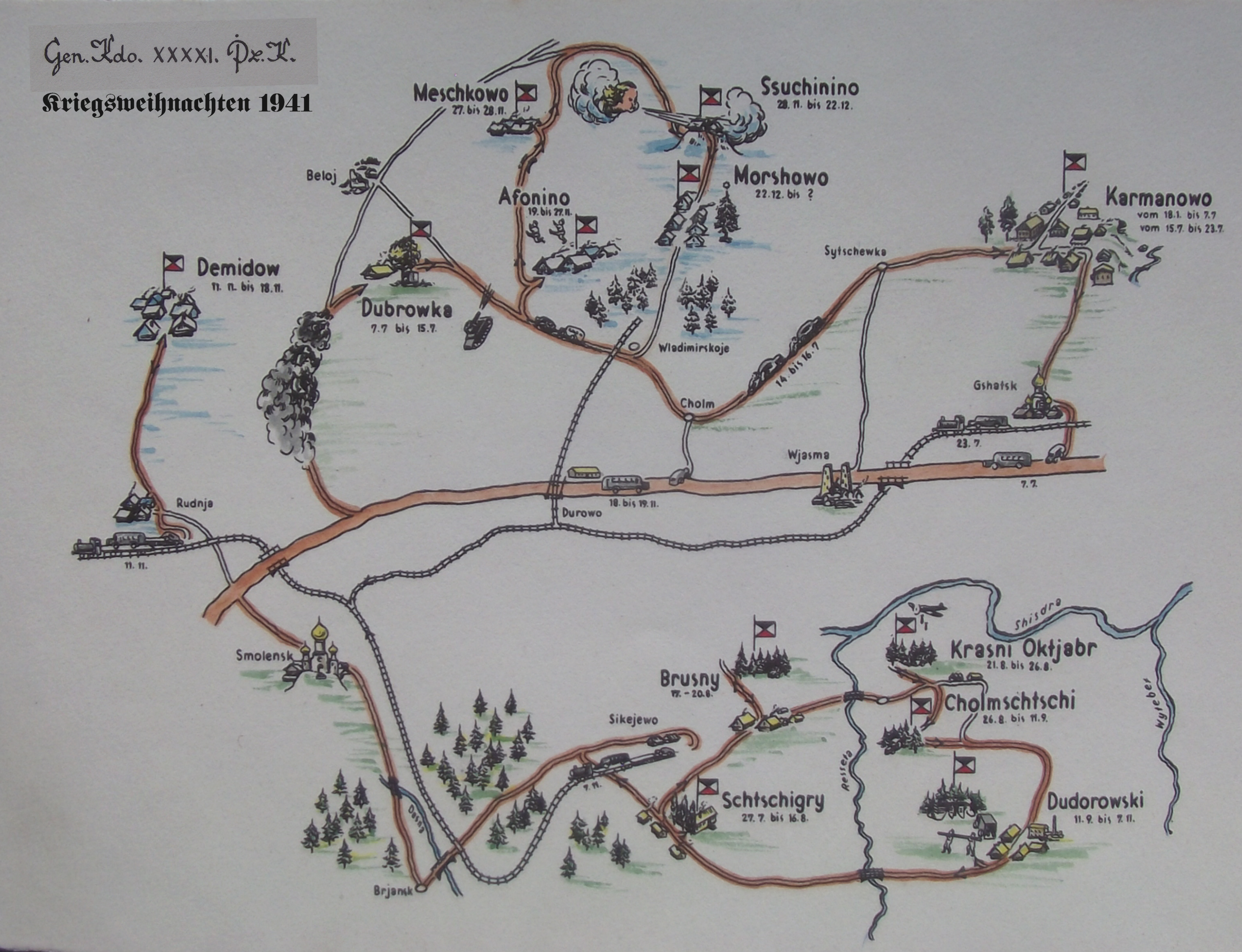
July - December 1941

The corps was originally formed, as the XXXXI Corps, on 5 February 1940 in Wehrkreis VIII (Silesia) as "Armeekorps (mot)". Reorganised as a Panzer Corps, it was known as the XXXXI Panzer Corps and was commanded by General Georg-Hans Reinhardt. In the May 1940 Battle of France, the XXXXI Panzer Corps was one of the three Panzerkorps that broke through the Ardennes in the Battle of Sedan and drove west to the sea at Abbeville.

In June 1941, the XXXXI Panzer Corps was deployed on the Eastern Front for Operation Barbarossa, the invasion of the Soviet Union. It defeated the Soviet 3rd Mechanised & 12th Mechanised Corps in the Battle of Raseiniai in late June, which destroyed more than 300 Soviet tanks and led the advance of Army Group North to the outskirts of Leningrad in October.

It was reorganised in 1942, becoming part of the 2nd Panzer Army of Army Group Centre. The XXXXI Panzer Corps fought at Bely, in the anti-partisan operations at Nikitinka, Yartsevo, Vyazma, and Dukhovshchina.

In March 1943, the corps fought at Smolensk, Kromy, and Bryansk. In April 1943, it fought in Sevsk and Ponyri. Later, the XXXXI Panzer Corps fought at the Battle of Kursk. During this period it transferred several times between the 9th and 2nd Panzer Armies.

In June / July 1944 the corps was almost destroyed during the Soviet summer offensive, Operation Bagration, and required complete rebuilding. As part of the reconstructed 4th Army, it faced the East Prussian Offensive during January 1945. After a week of heavy fighting, its divisions were encircled in the Heiligenbeil pocket on the Baltic coast, where they were destroyed in March. The corps headquarters were evacuated by sea to northern Germany and were placed under the 12th Army under General Walther Wenck. On May 7 it surrendered to US troops at Tangermünde with the rest of the 12th Army.

== Commanders ==
- Lieutenant General Georg-Hans Reinhardt: 5 February 1940 – 5 October 1941
- Lieutenant General Otto-Ernst Ottenbacher: 5 October – 1 November 1941
- General of Panzer Troops Walther Model: 1 November 1941 – 10 January 1942
- General of Panzer Troops Josef Harpe: 10 January 1942 – 15 October 1943
- General of Artillery Helmuth Weidling: 15 October 1943 – 19 June 1944
- Lieutenant-General Edmund Hoffmeister: 19 June – 1 July 1944
- General of Artillery Helmuth Weidling: 1 July 1944 – 10 April 1945
- Lieutenant-General Wend von Wietersheim: 10–19 April 1945
- Lieutenant-General Rudolf Holste: 19 April – 7 May 1945
