= Wilhelm Lorenz =

- Born: 25 April 1894
- Died: 2 January 1943 (aged 48); Demyansk
- Military career
- Allegiance: Nazi Germany
- Branch: Army
- Service years: 1912–1930; 1938–1943
- Rank: Generalmajor (Posthumously)
- Commands: 12th Infantry Division
- Conflicts: Demyansk Pocket †
- Awards: Knight's Cross of the Iron Cross

Wilhelm Lorenz (25 April 1894 – 2 January 1943) was a general in the Wehrmacht of Nazi Germany during World War II. He was a recipient of the Knight's Cross of the Iron Cross. Lorenz was wounded on 27 December 1942, and died from his wounds on 2 January 1943 in Demyansk, occupied Soviet Union. He was posthumously promoted to Generalmajor.

== Awards ==
- Knight's Cross of the Iron Cross on 28 December 1942 as Oberst and commander of Infanterie-Regiment 376

Military offices
| Preceded by Oberst Gerhard Müller | Commander of 12. Infanterie-Division; 11 July 1942 – 20 July 1942 | Succeeded by Generalleutnant Kurt-Jürgen Freiherr von Lützow |
