= Hans Refior =

German military officer (1906–1973)

Hans Refior (born 29 October 1906, died 1973) was an officer in the German Army during World War II. Refior was on the staff of the last two German commanders of the "Berlin Defense Area" during the final assault by Soviet forces on the city of Berlin.

On 18 March 1945, Colonel Refior became the Chief of Staff for Lieutenant General (Generalleutnant) Helmuth Reymann during the Battle for Berlin. Reymann was named the commander of the Berlin Defense Area on 6 March. From the beginning, it was clear to Refior that Reymann's predecessor, General Bruno Ritter von Hauenschild, had left them nothing.

By early April, Refior and Reymann confirmed to themselves that Berlin had no chance of holding out with the forces at their disposal. They recommended to Joseph Goebbels, the Minister of Propaganda, that civilians be allowed to leave. Refior and Reyman indicated that this was especially important for the women and children. Goebbels' feeble response made it clear to Refior and Reymann that he had never considered nor had he any idea of the logistics required for such a mass evacuation.

To determine how many soldiers and weapons could be counted on, Refior and Reymann attempted to make an accounting of what was available to them in the "Berlin Defense Area". They soon discovered that the title "Berlin Defense Area" carried no significance. "Berlin Defense Area" was just another phrase, like "Fortress" (Festung), coined by German dictator Adolf Hitler. Attempts by Refior to coordinate the defences with the field commanders of the surrounding areas of Berlin were not successful.

On 23 April, Hitler replaced Reymann with General der Artillerie Helmuth Weidling as the commander of the Berlin Defense Area. Weidling kept Refior and made him his "civil" Chief-of-Staff.

Early on the morning of 26 April, Refior was awoken from a brief sleep in Weidling's headquarters, the Bendlerblock. What woke him was a rapid sequence of ranging artillery shells (what the Soviets called "framing"). Refior noted that these were "old frontline hares". He knew from experience that these were the "greeting" before a salvo of katyusha rockets.

Weidling remained in command of Berlin's defences to the end. On 2 May General Weidling, Theodor von Dufving, Weidling's "military" Chief-of-Staff, and other members of Weidling's staff which included Refior, ultimately surrendered the city to Soviet General Vasily Chuikov.

In Cornelius Ryan's The Last Battle, Refior was listed as a contributor. His son is Dr. Hans Jürgen Refior (born 12 March 1938), a retired orthopedist.
