= XXXV Army Corps (Wehrmacht) =

Höheres Kommando z.b.V. XXXV XXXV. Armeekorps
- Active: 15 October 1939 – 5 July 1944
- Country: Nazi Germany
- Branch: Army
- Size: Corps
- Engagements: World War II: Operation Barbarossa; Battle of Kiev (1941); Battle of Moscow; Operation Kutuzov; Battle of Smolensk (1943); Operation Bagration; Bobruysk Offensive

Commanders
- Notable commanders: Rudolf Kämpfe; Lothar Rendulic

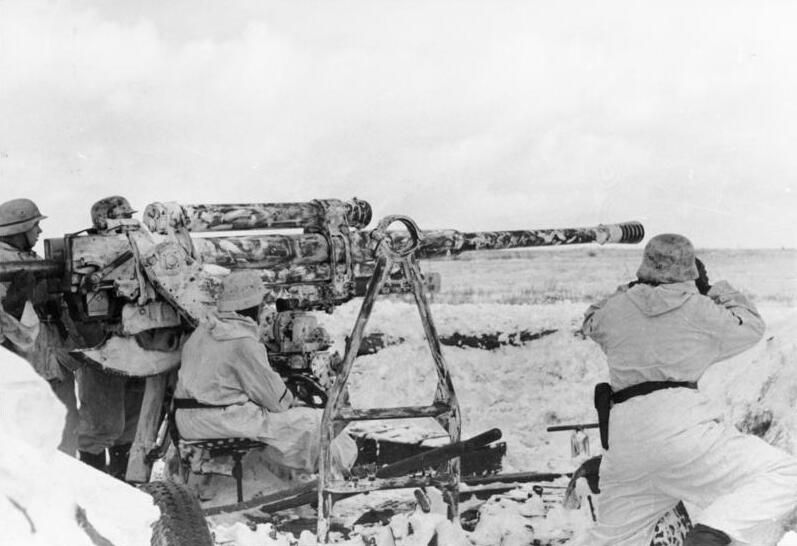
An anti-aircraft gun used by the XXXV Corps

German XXXV. Corps (XXXV. Armeekorps) was a corps in the German Army during World War II.

== History ==
The corps was first known as Höheres Kommando z.b.V. XXXV (H.Kdo.) and was established on 15 October 1939 in Breslau. After the Invasion of Poland, the H.Kdo was stationed there between December 1939 and June 1941.

After the start of Operation Barbarossa (June 1941), the H.Kdo saw its first action at the beginning of July 1941 in the Battle of Kiev (1941). As part of the 2nd Army, the H.Kdo formed part of the northern pincer. After successfully completing this battle, the H.Kdo advanced with the 2nd Panzer Army towards Moscow.

The H.Kdo. advanced towards Yefremov, but was overstretched and had hardly any contact with its neighbors. Now it was time for the Soviets to launch their Yelets Offensive on 6 December 1941. Soon the H.Kdo. was in full retreat under heavy attacks from the Soviet 3rd Army. The front line stabilised on December 17, 1941, but had moved almost 100 km back to the west. The H.Kdo. had suffered heavy losses. The weakness in defense of a Höheres Kommando also became extremely clear. On 20 January 1942, the H.Kdo. was transformed into a fully-fledged Army corps.

In 1942, the corps was stationed in the relative quiet Front sector around Oryol. In 1943, the corps had to withdraw during Operation Kutuzov and the Battle of Smolensk and ended up in the area around Zhlobin in Belarus. Here, the Front stabilised again between November 1943 and June 1944.

When the Soviets launched Operation Bagration on 23 June 1944, The corps was surrounded during the Bobruysk Offensive and completely destroyed.

== Commanders ==
=== Höheres Kommando XXXV ===
- General der Infanterie Max von Schenckendorff (15 October 1939 - 1 April 1941)
- General der Kavallerie Rudolf Koch-Erpach (1 April 1941 - 1 May 1941)
- General der Artillerie Rudolf Kämpfe (1 May 1941 - 20 January 1942)

=== XXXV Corps ===
- General der Artillerie Rudolf Kämpfe, (20 January 1942 - 19 July 1942)
- Generalleutnant Edgar Theißen, (19 July 1942 - 13 August 1942)
- General der Artillerie Rudolf Kämpfe, (13 August 1942 - 1 November 1942)
- Generaloberst Lothar Rendulic, (1 November 1942 – 5 August 1943)
- General der Infanterie Friedrich Wiese, (5 August 1943 – January 1944)
- General der Artillerie Horst Großmann, (January 1944 - February 1944)
- General der Infanterie Friedrich Wiese, (February 1944 – 25 June 1944)
- Generalleutnant Kurt-Jürgen Freiherr von Lützow, (25 June 1944 - 5 July 1944) (Corps destroyed and POW)

== Area of operations ==
- Poland : December 1939 – June 1941
- Eastern Front, central sector – July 1941 – July 1944 (Corps destroyed)

== See also ==
- List of German corps in World War II

== Sources ==
- This is a translation of the article in the Dutch Wikipedia, Höheres Kommando z.b.V. XXXV.
- This is a translation of the article in the Dutch Wikipedia, 35e Legerkorps (Wehrmacht).
- "Höheres Kommando z.b.V. XXXV". Lexikon der Wehrmacht.
- "XXXV. Armeekorps". Lexikon der Wehrmacht.
