= Nikitinka =

Nikitinka Никитинка
- Village
- Location within Bashkortostan Location within Russia
- Coordinates: 54°16′N 53°44′E
- Country: Russia
- Region: Bashkortostan
- District: Yermekeyevsky District
- Time zone: UTC+5:00

Nikitinka (Russian: Никитинка) is a rural locality (a village) in Sukkulovsky Selsoviet, Yermekeyevsky District, Bashkortostan, Russia. The population was 6 as of 2010. There is 1 street.

== Geography ==
Nikitinka is located 26 km north of Yermekeyevo (the district's administrative centre) by road. Mikhaylovka is the nearest rural locality.
