= Edmund Hoffmeister =

- Born: 4 March 1893; Aschaffenburg, Kingdom of Bavaria, German Empire
- Died: 20 February 1951 (aged 57); Asbest, Russian SFSR, USSR
- Military career
- Allegiance: German Empire (to 1918); Weimar Republic (to 1933); Nazi Germany
- Branch: Army
- Service years: 1914–1944
- Rank: Generalleutnant
- Commands: 383rd Infantry Division
- Conflicts: World War I World War II
- Awards: Knight's Cross of the Iron Cross

Edmund Hoffmeister (4 March 1893 – 20 February 1951) was an officer in the German Army, mainly notable for his service in World War II.

Hoffmeister's military service began in 1914 in the Imperial German army. During the 1930s, Hoffmeister was part of the 'Foreign Armies' (German: Fremde Heere) section of the German military and acted as liaison officer with the Soviet Union on the development of mechanised units.

Colonel (Oberst) Hoffmeister, as commander of Infantry Regiment 21 of the German 17th Infantry Division, was scheduled to link up with a 131-man Brandenburger commando team during Operation Sea Lion (Unternehmen Seelöwe) and push up the coast to Dover. Hoffmeister's division was to be part of the German 16th Army's area of operations. Operation Sea Lion was to have been launched in 1940 after the Fall of France, but it was abandoned in September of that same year.

Promoted to Lieutenant-General (Generalleutnant), Hoffmeister commanded the German 383rd Infantry Division on the Eastern Front from 1 July 1943 to 20 June 1944, and on 6 October 1943, was awarded a Knight's Cross of the Iron Cross.

Hoffmeister had just been promoted from command of the division to acting command of the formation of which it was a part, the XXXXI Panzer Corps (replacing Artillery General Helmuth Weidling), when it was destroyed in late June 1944. The 383rd Division was given the task of holding Babruysk against an overwhelming Soviet assault during Operation Bagration. Much of the remainder of XXXXI Panzer Corps was also destroyed, along with its parent formation, the Ninth Army.

Hoffmeister was taken prisoner by Soviet forces of the 2nd Belorussian Front on 1 July during a breakout attempt from the encirclement at Babruysk. The front's report for 8 July quoted Hoffmeister as giving a bitter and expletive-laden diatribe against the "amateurs" (i.e. the Nazi regime and senior generals loyal to them) whom he held responsible for the military catastrophe.

Later in July, Hoffmeister made a radio broadcast from Radio Moscow on behalf of the National Committee for a Free Germany, again attacking the Nazi regime in similar terms:

The defeat in White Russia is not the only example of Hitler's ineptitude as a commander. When Field Marshals von Leeb, List, von Rundstedt, von Bock and von Brauchitsch, Colonel General Halder and many others attempted to point out these mistakes Hitler dismissed them from their posts ... The newer generals, however, such as Rommel, Dietl, Schörner, Keitel and others who had not gone through a long military schooling failed to perceive these mistakes.

This represented something of a propaganda coup for the Soviets. Hoffmeister was also featured in NKFD-produced propaganda leaflets.

Hoffmeister died in 1951 while still in captivity in Asbest POW camp.

== Awards ==
- Iron Cross (1914)
  - 2nd Class
  - 1st Class
- Knights Cross of the House Order of Hohenzollern with Swords
- Wound Badge (1914)
  - in Black
- Honour Cross of the World War 1914/1918
- Wehrmacht Long Service Award, 4th to 1st class
- 1939 Clasps
  - 2nd Class
  - 1st Class
- Eastern Front Medal
- German Cross in Gold (11 December 1941)
- Knight's Cross of the Iron Cross on 6 October 1943 as Generalmajor and commander of the 383. Infanterie-Division

Military offices
Preceded by General der Artillerie Helmuth Weidling	Commander of XXXXI Panzerkorps; 19 June 1944 – 1 July 1944	Succeeded by General der Artillerie Helmuth Weidling
