= LVI Panzer Corps =

LVI. Armeekorps LVI. Panzerkorps
- Active: February 1941 – May 1945
- Country: Nazi Germany
- Branch: Army
- Type: Panzer corps
- Role: Armoured warfare
- Size: Corps
- Engagements: World War II

Commanders
- Notable commanders: Erich von Manstein; Helmuth Weidling

LVI Panzer Corps was a panzer corps in the German Army during World War II.

This corps was activated in February 1941 as the LVI Army Corps (mot.), for the German invasion of the Soviet Union, which commenced on 22 June 1941. Erich von Manstein led the corps in its advance from East Prussia to Demyansk, where, in September 1941, he was informed of his appointment as commander of the German Eleventh Army.

On 1 March 1942, the Corps was renamed LVI Panzer Corps. In 1942, as part of Army Group Center's 3rd Panzer Army, the LVI Panzer Corps was used to fight Soviet partisans on the Eastern Front. The corps was active in the Spas-Demensk and Kirov area before withdrawing to Krichev and across the Dnieper.

In the spring of 1944, the LVI Panzer Corps fought at Zhlobin and Kalinkovichi in Belarus. In May 1944, the LVI Panzer Corps was transferred to Army Group North Ukraine. From 22 June to 19 August, during Operation Bagration, the Soviets destroyed Army Group Center and swept the Germans from Belarus. The corps withdrew through the Pripet Marshes towards Brest-Litovsk. From 13 July to 29 July, as part of the 4th Panzer Army, the LVI Panzer Corps was involved in the unsuccessful German defense against the Soviet Lvov-Sandomierz Offensive. The corps continued to withdraw through Poland and into Germany as the Soviet advance continued.

In 1945, the LVI Panzer Corps became part of Army Group Vistula's 9th Army. From 16 April to 19 April, at the Battle of Seelow Heights, the corps suffered heavy losses along with the rest of the 9th Army. The remnants of the LVI Panzer Corps ended the war defending the south-eastern sector of the Nazi capital in the Battle of Berlin.

== Commanders ==
- Infantry General (General der Infanterie) Erich von Manstein – from February 1941 to 13 September 1941.
- General of the Tank Troops (General der Panzertruppe) Ferdinand Schaal – from 13 September 1941 to 1 August 1943
- Infantry General (General der Infanterie) Friedrich Hoßbach – from 1 August 1943 to 14 November 1943
- Infantry General (General der Infanterie) Anton Graßer – from 14 November 1943 to 9 December 1943
- Infantry General (General der Infanterie) Friedrich Hoßbach – from 9 December 1943 to 14 June 1944
- Infantry General (General der Infanterie) Johannes Block – from 15 June 1944 to 26 January 1945, killed in action
- General of the Cavalry (General der Kavallerie) Rudolf Koch-Erpach – from 26 January 1945 to 10 April 1945
- General of the Artillery (General der Artillerie) Helmuth Weidling – from 10 April 1945 to 2 May 1945, briefly replaced by Major General of the Reserve (Generalmajor der Reserve) Werner Mummert from 25 April to 26 April

== Area of operations ==
- Eastern Front, central sector – from March 1942 to July 1944
- Poland – from July 1944 to January 1945
- Eastern Germany and the city of Berlin – from January 1945 to May 1945
