= Werner Mummert =

German general (1897-1950)

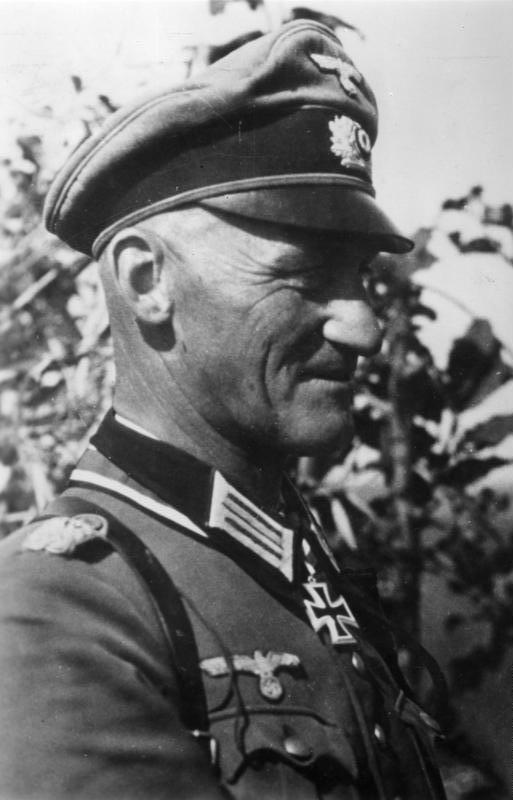
- Born: 31 March 1897; Lüttewitz, Kingdom of Saxony, German Empire
- Died: 28 January 1950 (aged 52); Shuya, Russian SFSR, Soviet Union
- Military career
- Allegiance: German Empire; Weimar Republic; Nazi Germany
- Branch: German Army
- Rank: Generalmajor
- Commands: Panzer Division Müncheberg
- Conflicts: World War I World War II
- Awards: Knight's Cross of the Iron Cross with Oak Leaves and Swords

Werner Mummert (31 March 1897 – 28 January 1950) was a general in the German Wehrmacht during World War II who commanded Panzer Division Müncheberg. A veteran of World War I, he was also a recipient of the Knight's Cross of the Iron Cross with Oak Leaves and Swords. Mummert surrendered to the Soviets in May 1945 and died in a prisoner of war camp five years later.

== Biography ==
Born in Saxony, Mummert volunteered for the army of Imperial Germany in 1914, upon the outbreak of the First World War. He was commissioned a reserve leutnant (lieutenant) two years later and was awarded the Iron Cross, 2nd Class, a Prussian decoration. He left the army after the end of the war but in 1936 he joined the Heer (Army) branch of the Wehrmacht. Initially posted to the 11th Infantry Regiment as a leutnant, Mummert transferred to 10th Cavalry Regiment in 1938 with the rank of Rittmeister (captain of cavalry). In 1939, he was appointed commander of AA.256, an Aufklärungsabteilung (reconnaissance unit) attached to an infantry division.

=== World War II ===
Mummert participated in the Wehrmacht's early campaigns of World War II and by mid-1940, he had been awarded the Iron Cross as well as a Clasp to the Iron Cross, both awards instituted by Nazi Germany. In January 1942, having been promoted to major, he was awarded the German Cross in Gold. Later that year he was awarded the Knight's Cross of the Iron Cross.

Mummert later led the 14th Panzer Reconnaissance Battalion of the reformed 14th Panzer Division, the original having been destroyed in the Battle of Stalingrad. His leadership style often saw him on the frontlines with his infantry and engaged in close combat, and he received several badges in recognition of this; the Panzer Badge and Close Combat Clasp, both in bronze, as well as the Tank Destruction Badge for Individual Combatants. He was given command of the 14th Panzer Division's 103rd Panzer Grenadier Regiment in January 1944. Promoted to Oberstleutnant (lieutenant colonel), he was awarded the Oak Leaves to his Knight's Cross. Nine months later, and now an oberst (colonel), he briefly led the 14th Panzer Division as its temporary commander. In October 1944, he was awarded the Swords to the Knight's Cross, the 107th recipient of this award.

In January 1945, Mummert took command of the newly formed Panzer Division Müncheberg and was promoted to generalmajor (equivalent to the rank of brigadier general in the United States Army) on 1 February. His new unit, which was beginning to assemble in the area west of Berlin, was a division in name only and had relatively few armoured vehicles. It was activated in March 1945 and dispatched to the Eastern Front and defended Soviet attempts to cross the Oder River. It later fought in the Battle of Seelow Heights and had to gradually withdraw into Berlin and was engaged in fighting around the Zoobunker and the Tiergarten. Following the destruction of the last of his division's tanks near the Brandenburg Gate, Mummert was wounded on 1 May. Despite this he remained in command until his surrender to the Soviets on 4 May. After the war, he was held in a prisoner of war camp in Russia where he died in 1950.

== Notes ==
Military offices
Preceded by —	Commander of Panzer Division Müncheberg; 15 January 1945 – 4 May 1945	Succeeded by —
