= List of Waffen-SS units =

This is an incomplete list of Waffen-SS units.

== Waffen-SS armies ==
Unit Name	Engagements	Notable Commanders	Parent Unit
6th SS Panzer Army	Western and Eastern Front	Sepp Dietrich	OB West, Heeresgruppe Süd
11th SS Panzer Army	Eastern Front, Operation Solstice	Felix Steiner	OB West

== Waffen-SS corps ==
- I SS Panzer Corps
- II SS Panzer Corps
- III (Germanic) SS Panzer Corps
- IV SS Panzer Corps (formerly VII SS Panzer Corps)
- V SS Mountain Corps
- VI SS Army Corps (Latvian)
- VII SS Panzer Corps (see above ↑ IV SS Panzer Corps)
- VIII SS Cavalry Corps (planned in 1945 but not formed)
- IX Waffen Mountain Corps of the SS (Croatian)
- X SS Corps (made up of disbanded XIV SS Corps headquarters)
- XI SS Panzer Corps
- XII SS Corps
- XIII SS Army Corps
- XIV SS Corps – (see above ↑ X SS Corps)
- XV SS Cossack Cavalry Corps
- XVI SS Corps
- XVII Waffen Corps of the SS (Hungarian)
- XVIII SS Corps
- SS Medical Corps
- Serbian Volunteer Corps (classified SS by 1944)
- British Free Corps
- Free Corps Denmark

== Waffen-SS divisions ==
- 1st SS Panzer Division "Leibstandarte SS Adolf Hitler"
- 2nd SS Panzer Division "Das Reich" (previously SS Division "Verfügungs", later SS Panzergrenadier Division "Das Reich")
- 3rd SS Panzer Division "Totenkopf" (previously SS Panzergrenadier Division "Totenkopf")
- 4th SS Polizei-Panzergrenadier Division
- 5th SS Panzer Division "Wiking" (previously SS Panzergrenadier Division "Wiking")
- 6th SS Mountain Division "Nord"
- 7th SS Volunteer Mountain Division "Prinz Eugen"
- 8th SS Cavalry Division "Florian Geyer"
- 9th SS Panzer Division "Hohenstaufen"
- 10th SS Panzer Division "Frundsberg"
- 11th SS Volunteer Panzergrenadier Division "Nordland"
- 12th SS Panzer Division "Hitlerjugend"
- 13th Waffen Mountain Division of the SS "Handschar" (1st Croatian)
- 14th Waffen Grenadier Division of the SS (1st Galician), later (1st Ukrainian)
- 15th Waffen Grenadier Division of the SS (1st Latvian)
- 16th SS Panzergrenadier Division "Reichsführer-SS"
- 17th SS Panzergrenadier Division "Götz von Berlichingen"
- 18th SS Volunteer Panzergrenadier Division "Horst Wessel"
- 19th Waffen Grenadier Division of the SS (2nd Latvian)
- 20th Waffen Grenadier Division of the SS (1st Estonian)
- 21st Waffen Mountain Division of the SS "Skanderbeg" (1st Albanian)
- 22nd SS Volunteer Cavalry Division
- 23rd Waffen Mountain Division of the SS "Kama" (2nd Croatian)
- 23rd SS Volunteer Panzergrenadier Division "Nederland" (1st Dutch) (formed after the dissolution of the 23rd "Kama" Division)
- 24th Waffen Mountain Karstjäger Division of the SS
- 25th Waffen Grenadier Division of the SS "Hunyadi" (1st Hungarian)
- 26th Waffen Grenadier Division of the SS "Hungaria" (2nd Hungarian)
- 27th SS Volunteer Grenadier Division "Langemarck" (1st Flemish)
- 28th SS Volunteer Grenadier Division "Wallonien"
- 29th Waffen Grenadier Division of the SS (1st Russian)
- 29th Waffen Grenadier Division of the SS (1st Italian) (formed after the disbanding of the 29th "1st Russian" Division)
- 30th Waffen Grenadier Division of the SS (2nd Russian), later (1st Belarusian)
- 31st SS Volunteer Grenadier Division
- 32nd SS Volunteer Grenadier Division "30 Januar"
- 33rd Waffen Cavalry Division of the SS (3rd Hungarian)
- 33rd Waffen Grenadier Division of the SS "Charlemagne" (1st French)
- 34th SS Volunteer Grenadier Division "Landstorm Nederland"
- 35th SS-Police Grenadier Division
- 36th Waffen Grenadier Division of the SS
- 37th SS Volunteer Cavalry Division
- 38th SS Grenadier Division "Nibelungen"

Also:

- SS-Kampfgruppe "Bohemia-Moravia"
- Panzer Division Kempf, a temporary unit of mixed Heer and Waffen-SS components
- 1st Cossack Cavalry Division
- 2nd Cossack Cavalry Division
- 26th SS Panzer Division (brigade size only, division title used as deception)
- 27th SS Panzer Division (brigade size only, division title used as deception)

== Waffen-SS brigades ==
- 1st SS Infantry Brigade
- 2nd SS Infantry Brigade
- 3rd Estonian SS Volunteer Brigade
- 4th SS Volunteer Panzergrenadier Brigade "Nederland"
- 5th SS Volunteer Assault Brigade "Wallonien", see Walloon Legion
- 6th SS Volunteer Assault Brigade "Langemarck"
- Assault Brigade "Reichsführer SS"
- 8th SS Volunteer Assault Brigade "France"
- SS Cavalry Brigade
- SS Brigade Westfalen
- Schutzmannschaft-Brigade Siegling
- SS Assault Brigade "Dirlewanger"
- SS Panzergrenadier Brigade 49 aka the 26th SS Panzer Division (brigade size only, division title used as deception)
- SS Panzergrenadier Brigade 51 aka the 27th SS Panzer Division (brigade size only, division title used as deception)
- SS Panzer Brigade 150
- SS Volunteer Grenadier Brigade "Landstorm Nederland"

== Waffen-SS foreign legions ==
- Azerbaijani SS volunteer formations
- British Free Corps
- Breton SS Armed Formation
- Norwegian Legion
- SS Ski Jäger Battalion "Norwegen"
- Estonian Legion
- Finnish Volunteer Battalion of the Waffen-SS
- Free Corps Denmark
- Indian Legion
- Kaminski Brigade
- Latvian Legion
- Serbian Volunteer Corps
- Tatar Legion
- Waffen Grenadier Regiment of the SS (1st Bulgarian) (1944)
- Waffen Grenadier Regiment of the SS (1st Romanian) (1944)

== Other Waffen-SS units ==
- 101st SS Heavy Panzer Battalion
- 102nd SS Heavy Panzer Battalion
- 103rd SS Heavy Panzer Battalion
- 500th SS Parachute Battalion
- 502nd SS Jäger Battalion
- 600th SS Parachute Battalion
- SS-Police Self-Protection Regiment "Sandžak"
- 1st Belgrade Special Combat detachment
