= Army Detachment Steiner =

Failed German military offensive

- German: Armeeabteilung Steiner
- Active: 21 – 30 April 1945
- Allegiance: Nazi Germany
- Branch: German Army; Waffen-SS
- Size: Strengthened corps
- Engagements: World War II: Eastern Front; Battle of Berlin

Commanders
- Notable commanders: Obergruppenführer Felix Steiner

Army Detachment Steiner (German: Armeeabteilung Steiner), also referred to as Army Group Steiner (German: Armeegruppe Steiner) or Group Steiner (German: Gruppe Steiner), was a temporary military unit (Armeegruppe-type), mid-way in strength between a corps and an army, created on paper by Adolf Hitler on 21 April 1945 during the Battle of Berlin, and placed under the command of SS-Obergruppenführer Felix Steiner.

Hitler hoped that the units assigned to Steiner would be able to stage an effective counterattack against the northern pincer of the Soviet assault on Berlin, but Steiner refused to attack upon realizing the units were inadequate. His force was made up of some soldiers, Hitler Youth teenagers, emergency Luftwaffe ground personnel, and Kriegsmarine dockworkers. The only tanks available were approximately a dozen captured French tanks from 1940. It was the failure of this offensive that led Hitler to admit out loud for the first time that Germany had lost the war.

== History ==
On the second day of the Battle of Berlin, 17 April, Generaloberst Gotthard Heinrici, the Commander-in-Chief of Army Group Vistula, stripped Steiner's III (Germanic) SS Panzer Corps (the army group's reserve) of its two strongest divisions, the 11th SS Volunteer Panzergrenadier Division Nordland and the 23rd SS Volunteer Panzergrenadier Division Nederland. He placed them under the command of General der Infanterie Theodor Busse, commander of the 9th Army, as Busse had most of the other units in the III Corps. The Nordland division was sent to join Helmuth Weidling's LVI Panzer Corps defending the Seelow Heights, to stiffen the sector held by the 9th Parachute Division. The Nederland Division was sent south-west of Frankfurt (Oder) and assigned to the V SS Mountain Corps, where it would later be destroyed in the Battle of Halbe.

Heinrici ordered the III SS Panzer Corps, reduced to three battalions and a few tanks, to scrape together whatever forces it could find to set up a screening line along the Finow Canal to protect the southern flank of the Third Panzer Army from an attack by Soviet Marshal Georgy Zhukov's 1st Belorussian Front, which had broken through the Seelow Heights' defences and was encircling Berlin.

By 21 April Adolf Hitler, ignoring the facts, started to call the ragtag units that came under Steiner's command "Army Detachment Steiner". He ordered Steiner to attack the northern flank of the huge salient created by the 1st Belorussian Front's breakout. Simultaneously the 9th Army, which had been pushed south of the salient, was to attack north in a pincer attack. To facilitate this attack Steiner was assigned the three divisions of the 9th Army's CI Army Corps, the 4th SS Polizei Panzergrenadier Division, the 5th Jäger Division, the 25th Panzergrenadier Division — all were north of the Finow Canal (Note: To assign units on the far side of an enemy salient from their own command to that of the local command is not unusual. For example in the Battle of the Bulge General Eisenhower reassigned the US First and US Ninth armies on the north side of the salient to the 21st Army Group (also on the north side), because it was now fighting side by side with the armies of the 21st Army Group, while its parent army group (the 12th) was on the south side of the salient with the rest of the 12th's armies.) — and Weidling's LVI Panzer Corps, which was still east of Berlin with its northern flank just below Werneuchen.

The three divisions to the north were to attack south from Eberswalde (on the Finow Canal and 24 km (15 miles) east of Berlin) towards the LVI Panzer Corps, so cutting the 1st Belorussian Front's salient in two. Steiner called Heinrici and informed him that the plan could not be implemented because the 5th Jäger Division and the 25th Panzergrenadier Division were deployed defensively and could not be redeployed until the 2nd Marine Division arrived from the coast to relieve them. This left only two battalions of the 4th SS Division available, and they had only pistols and submachine guns with no heavy weapons. Heinrici called Hans Krebs, Chief of the German General Staff of (OKH), told him that the plan could not be implemented and asked to speak to Hitler, but was told Hitler was too busy to take his call.

When, on 22 April, at his afternoon conference Hitler learned that Steiner was not going to attack, according to testimony of his secretary, Traudl Junge, he was "silent for a long time", and then insisted that the women (she and Eva Braun) should leave Berlin immediately (but they refused). He declared that the war was lost, blamed the generals and announced that he would rather stay in Berlin until the end and then kill himself. After 22 April "Army Detachment Steiner" was little mentioned in the Führerbunker.

== Order of battle ==
- III (Germanic) SS Panzer Corps
  - 4th SS Polizei Panzergrenadier Division
  - 5th Jäger Division
  - 25th Panzergrenadier Division

== See also ==
- 11th SS Panzer Army, which was part of Army Group Vistula and was under the command of Steiner while it was fighting east of the Oder River during February 1945. It was assigned to OB West and reorganized (and given the command of new units) for combat against the Western Allies in March 1945. Steiner remained in command of the III (Germanic) SS Panzer Corps and it remained in Army Group Vistula, transferring from the 11th to the 3rd Panzer Army. As Steiner also commanded the 11th SS Panzer Army during 1945, it can easily be confused with Army Detachment Steiner.
- Downfall (2004 film), in which Army Detachment Steiner is mentioned and has become part of popular culture.
