= Walther Wenck =

German officer and industrialist

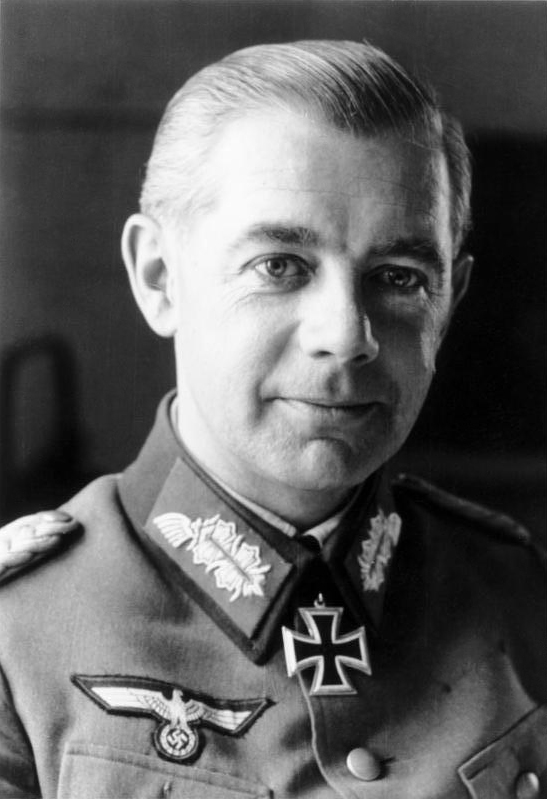
- Wenck in 1943
- Born: 18 September 1900; Lutherstadt Wittenberg, Province of Saxony, Kingdom of Prussia, German Empire
- Died: 1 May 1982 (aged 81) near Ried im Innkreis, Bezirk Ried im Innkreis, Upper Austria, Austria
- Military career
- Allegiance: Weimar Republic; Nazi Germany
- Branch: Reichswehr; German Army
- Service years: 1920–1945
- Rank: General der Panzertruppe
- Nickname: Boy General
- Commands: 12th Army
- Conflicts: World War I (noncombat); World War II
- Awards: Knight's Cross of the Iron Cross
- Other work: Arms Manufacturing

Walther Wenck (German: [ˈvaltɐ ˈvɛŋk]; 18 September 1900 – 1 May 1982) was a German military officer and industrialist. He was the youngest General of the branch (General der Truppengattung) in the German Army and a staff officer during World War II. At the end of the war, he commanded the German Twelfth Army that took part in the Battle of Berlin. Wenck left the military after surrendering to the Allies. He was asked to become Inspector General of the Bundeswehr as West Germany was re-arming in 1957, but declined to take the post when conditions he set were not met, such as the Inspector General being the commander-in-chief of the armed forces, not just an administrative leader.

Historians consider Wenck a capable commander and a brilliant improviser, although incapable of the impossible task he was given of saving Berlin in 1945.

== Early life ==
The third son of officer Maximilian Wenck, Walther was born in Wittenberg, Germany in 1900. In 1911 he joined the Naumburg Cadet Corps of the Prussian Army. From the spring of 1918 he went to the secondary military school in Gross-Lichterfeld.

== Career ==
Wenck joined a paramilitary group (Freikorps) in 1919 and then the Army (Reichswehr) of the Weimar Republic in 1920. From 1939 to 1942, Wenck was Chief of Operations for the 1st Panzer Division. In 1942, he was an instructor at the War Academy, chief of staff for the LVII Corps, and then the Third Romanian Army on the Eastern Front.

From 1942 to 1943, he was chief of staff of "Army Detachment Hollidt", named after Karl-Adolf Hollidt, which was subordinated to the Third Romanian Army. In 1943, he was Chief of Staff of the ill-fated 6th Army. From 1943 to 1944, Wenck served in the same capacity in the 1st Panzer Army. In 1944, he was chief of staff of Army Group South Ukraine. There he first attracted Adolf Hitler's attention with his report about conditions on the Eastern Front, saying, "As you see My Führer, the Eastern Front is like Swiss cheese, full of holes." Even though he was reprimanded for using informal language, Hitler commended the "liveliness" of his report.

On about 22 July 1944, Wenck was appointed Chief of Operations at OKH, the High Command of the German Army, by Heinz Guderian, who had just been appointed as OKH Chief of Staff by Hitler. He was soon advanced to Chief of Command Staff (Chief of the Führungsstab) an office that replaced Quartermaster General I.

On 13 February 1945, after a long argument, Guderian persuaded Hitler to make Wenck chief of staff of Army Group Vistula (with the power to launch an attack) under Himmler. Wenck's attack was initially successful, but Hitler requested him to attend daily Führer's briefings which forced him to make a daily round trip of 320 kilometres (200 mi). On February 17, 1945, an extremely tired Wenck took the driving wheel from his driver Dorn who had collapsed. Wenck then fell asleep at the wheel and crashed his car off the road. Saved by Dorn, he ended up in the hospital with a fractured skull and five broken ribs. Meanwhile, the attack failed.

On 10 April 1945, Wenck was appointed commander of the German Twelfth Army located to the west of Berlin to guard against the advancing American and British forces. But, as the Western Front moved eastwards and the Eastern Front moved westwards, the German armies making up both fronts backed towards each other. As a result, the area of control of Wenck's army to his rear and east of the Elbe River had become a vast refugee camp for Germans fleeing from the approaching Soviet Army. Wenck took great pains to provide food and lodging for these refugees. At one stage, the Twelfth Army was estimated to be feeding more than a quarter of a million people every day.

=== Battle of Berlin ===
On 21 April, Hitler ordered Waffen SS Obergruppenführer Felix Steiner to attack the forces of Soviet Marshal Georgy Zhukov's 1st Belorussian Front. Zhukov's forces were encircling Berlin from the north, while the forces of Soviet Marshal Ivan Konev's 1st Ukrainian Front were encircling from the south. Steiner was to attack Zhukov with his Army Detachment Steiner. With few operational tanks and roughly a division's worth of infantry, Steiner requested that his "army" be allowed to retreat instead of attacking.

On 22 April, as Steiner retreated, Wenck's Twelfth Army became part of an unrealistic and poorly planned attempt by Hitler to save Berlin from encirclement. Under suggestion of Generaloberst Alfred Jodl, Wenck was ordered to disengage the Americans to his west and, attacking to the east, link up with the Ninth Army of General der Infanterie Theodor Busse. Together, they would attack the Soviets encircling Berlin from the west and from the south. Meanwhile, the XLI Panzer Corps under General Rudolf Holste would attack the Soviets from the north.

Wenck's forces attacked towards Berlin, but they were halted outside of Potsdam by strong Soviet resistance. Neither Busse nor Holste made much progress towards Berlin. By the end of the day on 27 April, the Soviet forces encircling Berlin linked up and the forces inside the city were cut off.

During the night of 28 April, Wenck reported to the German Supreme Army Command in Fuerstenberg that his Twelfth Army had been forced back along the entire front. According to Wenck, no attack on Berlin was possible as support from Busse's Ninth Army could no longer be expected. Instead, starting 24 April, Wenck moved his army towards the Forest of Halbe, broke into the Halbe pocket and linked up with the remnants of the Ninth Army, Hellmuth Reymann's "Army Group Spree," and the Potsdam garrison. Wenck brought his army, remnants of the Ninth Army, and many civilian refugees across the Elbe and into territory occupied by the U.S. Army.

According to Antony Beevor, Wenck's eastward attack toward Berlin was aimed specifically at providing the population and garrison of Berlin with an escape route to areas occupied by U.S. forces: "Comrades, you've got to go in once more," Wenck said. "It's not about Berlin any more, it's not about the Reich any more." Their task was to save people from the fighting and the Russians. Wenck's leadership struck a powerful chord, even if the reactions varied between those who believed in a humanitarian operation and those keener to surrender to the Western allies instead of the Russians. According to Randall Hansen, Wenck's actions, with the help of luck and U.S. General William Simpson, successfully evacuated a large number of troops and civilians (variously estimated from tens of thousands to hundreds of thousands), with Wenck himself being one of the last who crossed the river.

== Later life and death ==
Wenck was taken prisoner by the U.S. Army. He was released in 1947, and then began a second career as an industrialist. During the 1950s, he worked as the managing director of Dr. C. Otto & Comp., a producer of industrial ovens, and in the 1960s as the director of the Diehl Group, an arms manufacturer.

In 1957, he was invited to become Inspector General of the Bundeswehr, but refused after being informed that his requirements, such as turning the office into that of Commander-in-chief, could not be met.

In Cornelius Ryan's 1966 epic The Last Battle he was listed as a contributor.

On 1 May 1982, Wenck died while on a trip to Austria, when his car collided with a tree. He was buried in his hometown of Bad Rothenfelde in Lower Saxony a few days later.

== Awards ==
- Iron Cross (1939) 2nd Class (13 September 1939) & 1st Class (4 October 1939)
- German Cross in Gold (26 January 1942)
- Knight's Cross of the Iron Cross on 28 December 1942 as Oberst and chief of the general staff of the Armeegruppe Hollidt.

== See also ==
- Battle of Halbe – 1945
- Hans Krebs, Chief of Staff
- Helmuth Weidling, Commander of the Berlin Defense Area
- Gotthard Heinrici, Commander of Army Group Vistula

Military offices
Preceded by Generaloberst Alexander Löhr reformed	Commander of 12. Armee; 10 April 1945 – 7 May 1945	Succeeded by None (army disbanded)
