= East Pomeranian offensive =

Part of the USSR's invasion of occupied Poland and Germany during WWII

East Pomeranian Offensive East Pomeranian strategic offensive operation
- Part of the Eastern Front of World War II
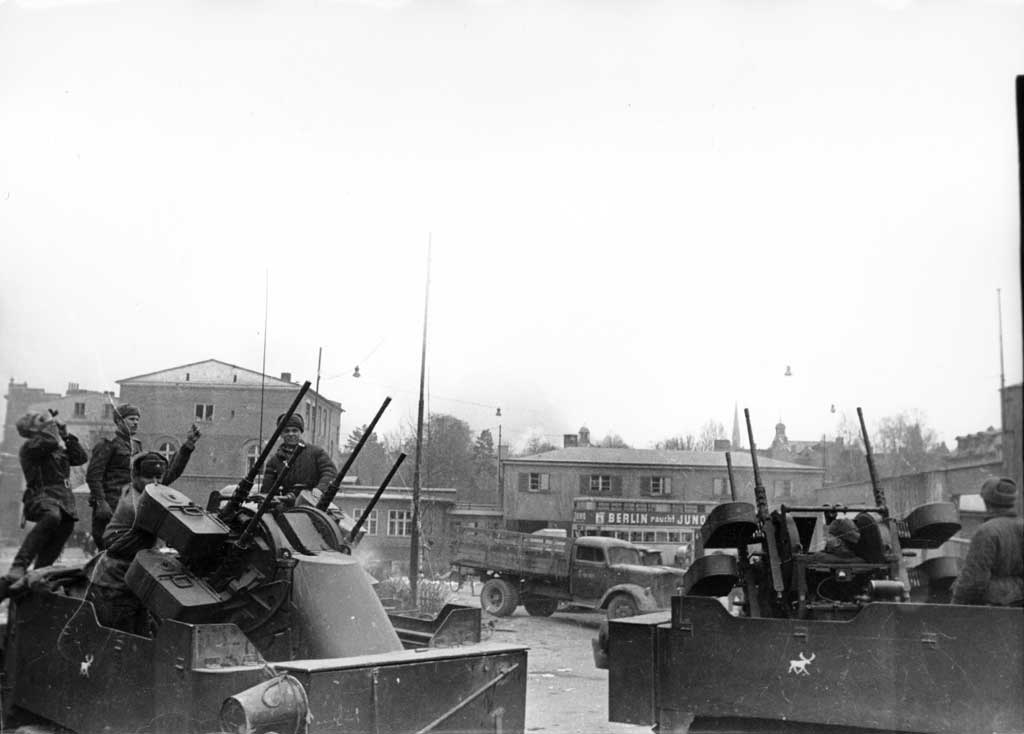
- Soviet troops manning two M16 Multiple Gun Motor Carriage (MGMC) self-propelled anti-aircraft vehicles (half-tracks) in Danzig, March 1945.
Date	24 February – 4 April 1945
Location	Pomerania, Danzig-West Prussia inside Germany
Result	Soviet victory

Belligerents
Germany	Soviet Union; Poland

Commanders and leaders
(Nazi Germany) Walter Weiß (Nazi Germany) Dietrich von Saucken (2nd Army)	(Soviet Union) Konstantin Rokossovsky (2nd Belorussian Front)

Strength
Unknown	996,100

Casualties and losses
Unknown	234,360: 55,315 killed or missing; 179,045 wounded; Materiel destroyed or captured: 1,027 tanks and self-propelled guns; 1,005 guns and mortars; 1,073 aircraft

The East Pomeranian strategic offensive operation (Russian: Восточно-Померанская наступательная операция) was an offensive by the Soviet Red Army against the German Wehrmacht on the Eastern Front. It took place in Pomerania and West Prussia from 10 February – 4 April 1945.

The operation happened in four phases:

Konitz–Köslin offensive operation 24 February – 6 March 1945
Danzig offensive operation 7–31 March 1945
Arnswalde–Kolberg offensive operation 1–18 March 1945
Altdamm offensive operation 18 March – 4 April 1945 (near Stettin)

It was the East Pomeranian offensive that prevented Zhukov from reaching Berlin in February (the object of the massive Vistula–Oder offensive), since it became a priority to clear German forces from Pomerania first.

== Planning ==
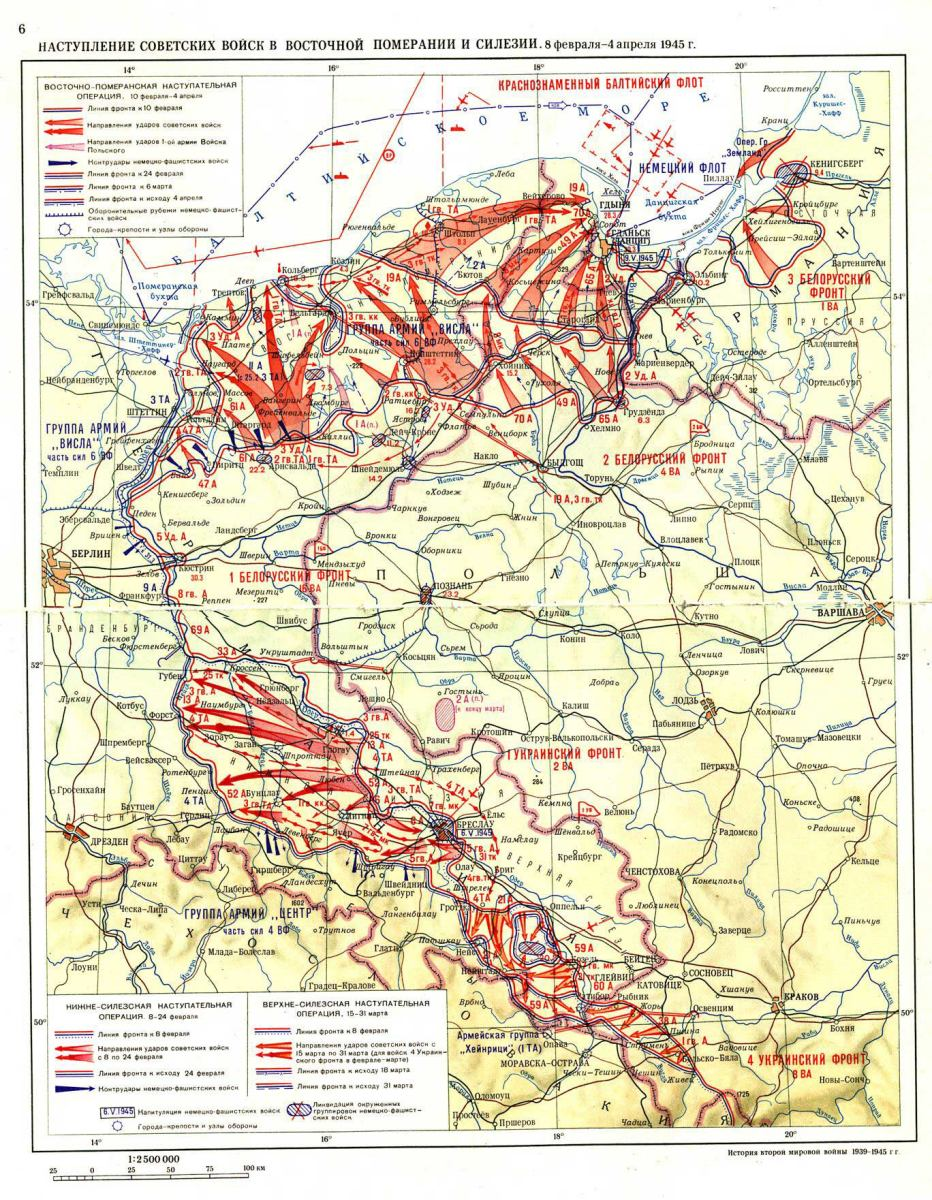
Pomeranian and Silesian offensives

The 2nd Belorussian Front—under Konstantin Rokossovsky—had initially been tasked with advancing westward north of the Vistula River toward Pomerania and the major port city of Danzig, with the primary aim of protecting the right flank of Zhukov's 1st Belorussian Front, which was pushing towards Berlin. During the East Prussian offensive, however, Rokossovsky was ordered to wheel directly north toward Elbing. This left substantial German forces intact in Pomerania, where they threatened the right flank of Zhukov's formations.

As a result, once the initial phase of the East Prussian offensive was over, the 2nd Belorussian Front was redeployed with the intention of attacking westwards into Pomerania, eliminating the possibility of a German counter-offensive (similarly, the parallel Silesian offensives of Konev's 1st Ukrainian Front in the south were in part designed to protect the 1st Belorussian Front's left flank). The need to secure the flanks delayed the Soviets' final push towards Berlin, which was originally planned for February, until April.

Joseph Stalin's decision to delay the push toward Berlin from February to April has been a subject of some controversy among both the Soviet generals and military historians, with one side arguing that the Soviets had a chance of securing Berlin much quicker and with much lower losses in February, and the other arguing that the danger of leaving large German formations on the flanks could have resulted in a successful German counter-attack and prolonged the war further: the Germans did in fact mount a surprise counter-attack in Pomerania in mid-February, Operation Solstice. The delay did, however, allow the Soviets to occupy significant parts of Austria in the Vienna offensive.

== German intelligence ==
As early as 13 February, German intelligence services had deduced that the Soviets would seek to clear Pomerania before advancing on Berlin. The 2nd Army—defending a large and exposed sector running through Pomerania eastward toward the edge of East Prussia at Elbing—sought permission to withdraw, but this was denied by Adolf Hitler. Graudenz, on the Vistula, was surrounded on 18 February (the garrison, from the 83rd Infantry Division, finally surrendered the following month).

== Deployments ==
=== Wehrmacht ===
- Army Group Vistula
  - 2nd Army (Colonel-General Walter Weiß)
    - XXXXVI Panzer Corps
    - VII Panzer Corps
    - XXVII Army Corps
    - XXIII Corps
    - XVIII Mountain Corps
    - Fortress garrisons of Graudenz and Danzig
  - Eastern flank of 3rd Panzer Army (reconstituted) (General Erhard Raus)
    - III SS Panzer Corps
    - X SS Corps

The corps of the Second Army were seriously understrength by this time, being composed largely of fragmentary or ad hoc units. The 3rd Panzer Army had been rebuilt using the korps of the recently formed 11th SS Panzer Army, the original formation having been largely destroyed in Lithuania and East Prussia, where its remnants were now defending Königsberg.

=== Red Army ===
- 2nd Belorussian Front (Marshal Konstantin Rokossovsky)
- Eastern flank of 1st Belorussian Front (Marshal Georgy Zhukov)
  - 3rd Shock Army
  - 1st Guards Tank Army
  - 2nd Guards Tank Army

== The offensive ==
=== Breakthrough ===
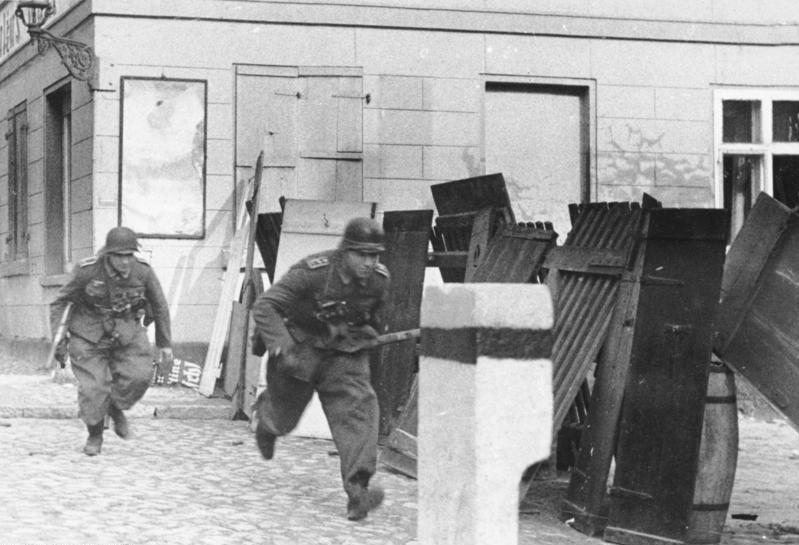
German infantrymen during street fighting in Wollin, March 1945

Rokossovsky opened the offensive on 24 February using the fresh troops of Kozlov's 19th Army, but after an initial advance of some 20 km (12 mi) they were halted by intense German resistance. On 26 February, he inserted the 3rd Guards Tank Corps east of Neustettin, where they achieved a penetration of 40 km (25 mi), and relieved Kozlov of command. The 3rd Guards Tank Corps broke through at Baldenburg, while Neustettin on the Front's left flank fell to the 3rd Guards Cavalry Corps on 27 February.

Weiß had hurriedly assembled the VII Panzer Corps, including the remnants of the 7th Panzer Division, at Rummelsburg to threaten 19th Army's flank. However, after a Soviet breakthrough at Köslin on 2 March, the 2nd Army found itself completely cut off from the rest of its Army Group.

=== 1st Belorussian Front joins the attack ===
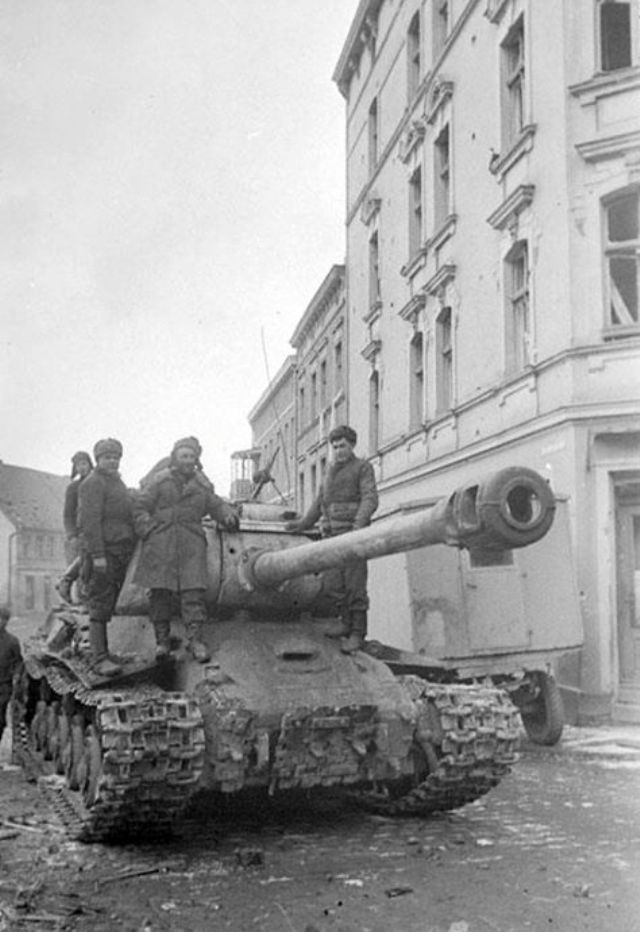
Soviet IS-2 in Stargard, 19 March 1945

Zhukov's right wing—a grouping of the 3rd Shock Army and 1st and 2nd Guards Tank Armies—went over to the offensive on 1 March, striking northward with the main force concentrated at Reetz. The entire left wing of 3rd Panzer Army was cut off by their breakthrough, after Guderian refused Raus' request for withdrawal; the right flank withdrew towards Stettin.

On 4 March, forward Soviet tank units reached the Baltic, and the German forces in Pomerania were trapped in a series of encirclements. The 2nd Army began to fall back on the Danzig fortified area, while the X SS Corps of the 3rd Panzer Army had been surrounded at Dramburg.

=== The second phase ===
Rokossovsky opened the second phase of his offensive on March 6. The 2nd Shock Army threatened to cut off the defending forces in the fortress of Marienburg, which was evacuated two days later, while in the east Elbing finally fell on 10 March. The defence of Marienburg was conducted by a Kampfgruppe under the nominal control of the staff of the 7th Infantry Division, including marine, SS and other units. Weiß, having warned that the Elbing pocket could not be held, was relieved of command on 9 March and replaced by Dietrich von Saucken. The troops of the German 2nd Army withdrew in disarray into Danzig and Gdingen, where the 2nd Belorussian Front besieged them. Zhukov's forces meanwhile, cleared the remainder of 3rd Panzer Army from the east bank of the lower Oder, driving the Germans from their last positions in a bridgehead at Altdamm.

== Siege of Kolberg ==
Many civilian refugees from Pomerania had fled into the coastal town of Kolberg, which was surrounded by 4 March. Nevertheless, the town was successfully defended until 18 March, by which time evacuation was almost complete.

== Siege of Danzig ==
The Danzig-Gotenhafen Fortified Area—also the main port for refugees from East Prussia escaping to the west—was ordered to be defended for as long as possible by Saucken in order to keep the evacuation routes open.

Rokossovsky opened his final offensive on 15 March 1945; the main thrust, toward the coast at Zoppot between Gdingen and Danzig, being undertaken by the 70th and 49th Army advancing in parallel. The fighting was savage, but by 19 March 1945 the Soviet spearheads had reached the heights over Zoppot, while the 4th Panzer Division had been pushed back to the outskirts of Danzig itself. By 22 March 1945, the 70th Army reached the sea, splitting the German defence. Gdingen was taken on 26 March 1945, its defenders and many civilians retreating to the headland at Oxhöft, from where they were evacuated to the Hel Peninsula.

Danzig finally fell on 30 March 1945, after which the remnants of the 2nd Army withdrew to the Vistula delta southeast of the city. Evacuation of civilians and military personnel from there and from the Hel Peninsula continued until 10 May 1945. The Soviets declared the East Pomeranian offensive complete a week after the fall of Danzig.

According to Soviet claims, in the Battle of Danzig the Germans lost 39,000 soldiers dead and 10,000 captured.

== See also ==
- History of Pomerania (1933–1945)
- Operation Hannibal, the evacuation effort by the Kriegsmarine
- Operation Solstice, the preceding German offensive in Pomerania
- East Prussian offensive, the parallel offensives of the 3rd Belorussian Front to the east
- The Heiligenbeil Pocket, the parallel defence of the German 4. Armee east of Elbing
- The Pomeranian Wall, a German line of fortifications overrun largely by the First Polish Army
