= Rudolf Holste =

German general during World War II

- Born: 9 April 1897; Hessisch Oldendorf, German Empire
- Died: 4 December 1970 (aged 73); Baden-Baden, West Germany
- Military career
- Allegiance: German Empire (to 1918); Weimar Republic (to 1933); Nazi Germany
- Branch: Army (Wehrmacht)
- Service years: 1914–1945
- Rank: Generalleutnant
- Commands: 14th Infantry Division; 4th Cavalry Division; XLI Panzer Corps
- Conflicts: World War I World War II
- Awards: Knight's Cross of the Iron Cross with Oak Leaves

Rudolf Holste (9 April 1897 – 4 December 1970) was a German general during World War II. He commanded the XLI Panzer Corps during the Battle of Berlin, allegedly abandoning his troops on 1 May 1945, one day before the city capitulated.

== Career ==
Holste joined the Imperial German Army in August 1914 and was commissioned as a Leutnant in 1915. He served throughout World War I in Field Artillery Regiment 62, becoming the regimental adjutant in 1918. After the end of the war, he remained in the peacetime Reichswehr as a career officer in the artillery branch. During World War II, he commanded artillery regiments, the 14th Infantry Division and the 4th Cavalry Division, before becoming the last commander of the XLI Panzer Corps in the final weeks of the war. On 15 November 1944, Holste was promoted to Generalmajor and, on 4 May 1945, to Generalleutnant.

=== Battle of Berlin ===
On 22 April 1945, Holste became part of a poorly conceived and particularly desperate plan that Field Marshal Wilhelm Keitel and Colonel General Alfred Jodl proposed to Adolf Hitler. The plan envisaged for the few remaining German forces in central Germany to attack the Soviet forces encircling Berlin. The plan called for General Walther Wenck's Twelfth Army on the Elbe and Mulde fronts to be turned around and to attack towards the east, then linking up just south of Berlin with General Theodor Busse's Ninth Army. Then both armies would strike in a northeastern direction towards Potsdam and Berlin. Wenck's objective would be the autobahn at Ferch, near Potsdam.

Holste's directive was to attack from the area northwest of Berlin with his XLI Panzer Corps across the Elbe between Spandau and Oranienburg. To give Holste as much punch as possible, Obergruppenführer Felix Steiner (who had been himself the subject of another desperate attempt by Hitler to save Berlin, a few days earlier) was to turn over to Holste his mechanized divisions (the 25th Panzer-Grenadiers and the 7th Panzer). Wenck's army did make a turn around and attacked towards Berlin, but was soon halted outside of Potsdam by strong Soviet resistance. Neither Busse nor Holste made much progress towards Berlin. By the end of the day on 27 April, the Soviet forces encircling Berlin linked up and the forces inside Berlin were cut off.

Late in the evening of 29 April, General Hans Krebs contacted Jodl by radio from Berlin and requested an immediate report on the whereabouts of Holste's spearhead. On 30 April, Jodl replied that Holste's Corps was on the defensive. Early on the morning of May 1, Holste is reported to have appeared at Twelfth Army HQ having abandoned his troops. A day later, on 2 May, the Battle for Berlin came to an end when General Helmuth Weidling unconditionally surrendered the city to the Soviets. Holste surrendered 8 May 1945. In 1947, he was released.

== Awards ==
- Iron Cross (1914) 2nd Class (24 July 1915) & 1st Class (16 November 1917)
- Friedrich-August-Kreuz, 1st and 2nd class
- Hanseatic Cross of Hamburg
- Wound Badge in black
- Honour Cross of the World War 1914/1918
- Clasp to the Iron Cross 2nd Class (19 September 1939) & 1st Class (14 October 1939)
- German Cross in Gold on 24 December 1941 as Oberstleutnant in Artillerie-Regiment 73
- Knight's Cross of the Iron Cross with Oak Leaves
  - Knight's Cross on 6 April 1942 as Oberst and commander of Artillerie-Regiment 73
  - Oak Leaves on 27 August 1944 as Oberst and commander of 4. Kavallerie-Brigade

== Bibliography ==
- Beevor, Antony (2002). The Fall Of Berlin 1945. New York: Viking Penguin Group. p. 379.
- Fellgiebel, Walther-Peer (2000) [First published 1986]. Die Träger des Ritterkreuzes des Eisernen Kreuzes 1939–1945 — Die Inhaber der höchsten Auszeichnung des Zweiten Weltkrieges aller Wehrmachtteile [The Bearers of the Knight's Cross of the Iron Cross 1939–1945 — The Owners of the Highest Award of the Second World War of all Wehrmacht Branches] (in German). Friedberg, Germany: Podzun-Pallas. ISBN 978-3-7909-0284-6.
- Patzwall, Klaus D.; Scherzer, Veit (2001). Das Deutsche Kreuz 1941 – 1945 Geschichte und Inhaber Band II [The German Cross 1941 – 1945 History and Recipients Volume 2] (in German). Norderstedt, Germany: Verlag Klaus D. Patzwall. ISBN 978-3-931533-45-8.
- Thomas, Franz (1997). Die Eichenlaubträger 1939–1945 Band 1: A–K [The Oak Leaves Bearers 1939–1945 Volume 1: A–K] (in German). Osnabrück, Germany: Biblio-Verlag. ISBN 978-3-7648-2299-6.
- Zetner, Kurt (1963). Illustrierte Geschichte Des Zweiten Weltkriegs. Munich: Sudwest Verlag. p. 566.
- Webb, James Jack (2024). Generals and Admirals of the Third Reich: For Country or Fuehrer. Vol. 2: H–O. Havertown, PA: Casemate Publishers. ISBN 978-1-952-71517-4.

Military offices
Preceded by Generalleutnant Walther Krause	Commander of 14. Infanterie-Division; 1 January 1943 – 15 May 1943	Succeeded by Generalleutnant Hermann Flörke
Preceded by Formed from 4. Kavallerie-Brigade	Commander of 4th Cavalry Division; 28 February 1945– 29 March 1945	Succeeded by Generalleutnant Helmuth von Grolman
Preceded by Generalleutnant Wend von Wietersheim	Commander of XLI Panzer Corps; 19 April 1945– 8 May 1945	Succeeded by None
