= 11th Army (Wehrmacht) =

Unit of the German Army in the Eastern Front of World War II

- German: 11. Armee
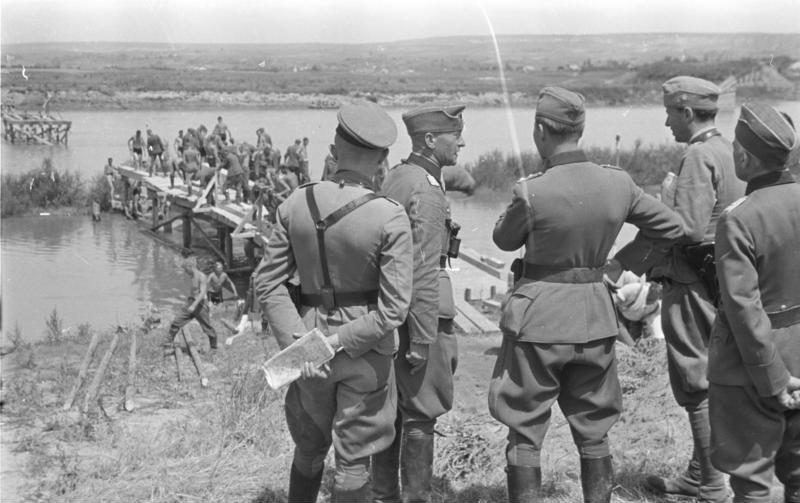
- Bridge construction on the Pruth, Romania, 1 July 1941
- Active: October 5, 1940 – November 21, 1942; November 26, 1944 – April 21, 1945 (11th SS Panzer Army)
- Country: Nazi Germany
- Branch: German army ( Wehrmacht)
- Type: Field army
- Nickname(s): 11th SS Panzer Army (second deployment only)
- Engagements: World War II: Sevastopol

Commanders
- Notable commanders: Erich von Manstein

The 11th Army (German: 11. Armee) was a World War II field army.

Assembled twice (once from October 1940 to November 1942 and a second time from November 1944 to April 1945), it was also known as 11th SS Panzer Army during its second deployment.

== Operational history ==
=== Formation ===
The 11th Army was established on 5 October 1940 as "Kommandostab Leipzig", but changed its designation to Kommandostab München on 23 April 1941. It was restructured into Heeresgruppe Don on 21 November 1942. After being reformed on 26 January 1945 and taking part in various counter-offensives against the Soviet and US advance, the army surrendered to American troops on 23 April 1945.

The 11th Army was activated in 1940 to prepare for the forthcoming German attack on the Soviet Union.

=== Operation Barbarossa ===
The 11th Army was part of Army Group South when it invaded the USSR during Operation Barbarossa. In September 1941, Erich von Manstein was appointed its commander. His predecessor, Colonel-General Eugen Ritter von Schobert, perished when his Fieseler Storch aircraft landed in a Soviet minefield.

At the start of Barbarossa, the 11th Army order of battle included:

- LIV Corps
  - 50th Infantry division
  - 170th Infantry division
  - 138th Artillery brigade
  - 190th Assault Gun battalion
  - 197th Assault Gun battalion
  - 46th Combat Engineer battalion
  - 744th Combat Engineer battalion
  - 454th Corps Signal battalion
- XXX Corps
  - 198th Infantry division
  - 14th Infantry division (Romanian)
  - 5th Cavalry brigade (Romanian)
  - 110th Artillery brigade
  - 249th Assault Gun battalion
  - 610th Anti-aircraft Artillery battalion
  - 70th Nebelwerfer battalion (150 mm mortars 280 mm guns)
  - 690th Field Engineer regiment
  - 430th Corps Signal battalion
  - 430th Corps Supply battalion
  - 430th Corps Cartographic battalion
- XI Corps
  - 76th Infantry division
  - 239th Infantry division
- Army reserves and other assets
  - 22nd Infantry division
  - 766th Artillery regiment
  - 300th Tank battalion
  - 19th Construction brigade
  - 926th Construction command
  - 617th Cartography battalion
  - 558th Army Communications regiment
  - 756th Traffic controllers battalion
  - Railroad operations command
  - 693rd Propaganda company

The 11th Army was tasked with invading the Crimea and the pursuit of enemy forces on the flank of Army Group South during its advance into the Soviet Union.

The 11th Army order of battle included three Corps: XXX Corps, which was composed of the 22nd, 72nd and Leibstandarte Adolf Hitler divisions and the XI Corps, consisting of the 170th Infantry Division and the 1st and 4th Mountain Divisions; and LIVth Corps, consisting of the 46th, 73rd and 50th Infantry Divisions. The latter formation had been in charge of the advance into the Crimean peninsula earlier in September. The Romanian 3rd Army, three Mountain brigades and three cavalry brigades, were also under von Manstein's command.

Einsatzgruppe D was attached to the 11th Army.

=== Battle of Sevastopol ===
The 11th Army fought in southern USSR from 1941 until mid-summer 1942 and laid siege to Sevastopol. It did not take part in Fall Blau when Army Group South attacked in Southern Russia towards the Caucasus and Stalingrad. The 11th Army cut the Soviets off from the sea at Sevastopol, thus sealing the fate of the remaining defenders. After a 248-day-long siege, an estimated 100,000 prisoners marched into captivity. For his achievements in this battle, Manstein was promoted to field marshal. A grateful Adolf Hitler also authorized the Crimean Shield to commemorate the efforts of the 11th Army. It was a costly victory, however: the 11th Army's casualties and material losses were so high it was no longer a viable fighting force in its own right. Manstein recommended that the 11th Army either cross the straits of Kerch and push into the Kuban area to aid in the capture of Rostov, or be placed into Army Group South reserve. Instead, part of the 11th Army, along with the heavy siege train, was transferred to Army Group North. Ordered to oversee Leningrad's reduction, Manstein transferred with them. The remainder of the 11th Army was parcelled out to Army Group Center and Army Group South.

This breakup of the 11th Army and its disappearance from the order of battle of Army Group South would have dire consequences for Nazi Germany. During the course of the following fall and winter of 1942, the Battle of Stalingrad took place. The Luftwaffe had largely reduced the city to rubble and the presence of the Volga behind the city made it virtually impossible for the Germans to follow the classical dual pincer envelopment strategy. The Red Army now opted 'hugging' tactics, (keeping the front lines as close to the Axis forces as possible), thereby rendering tanks, aircraft, and artillery largely redundant, and placing the entire responsibility on the infantry.

Although the 6th Army had managed to capture most of the city and had pushed the Soviets to the banks of the Volga river in several places, it needed several more infantry divisions (as explained above), to take the city completely. In spite of repeated requests to the German high command, the 6th Army was not reinforced because no other reinforcements were available in the region, or close enough to support them. As the battle grew more intense, the Soviets counterattacked on both sides of the 6th Army's flanks and destroyed the Romanian 3rd and 4th Armies. The Soviet pincers then linked up, thereby surrounding and ultimately destroying the 6th Army.

The 11th Army was de-activated on 21 November 1942 and was used to form the newly created Army Group Don.

==== Order of battle ====
The 11th Army, during the battle of Sevastopol, consisted of nine German infantry divisions (including two taken on strength during the battle), in two corps, and two Romanian rifle corps, plus various supporting elements, including 150 tanks, several hundred aircraft and one of the heaviest concentrations of artillery fielded by the Wehrmacht.

- LIV Corps - commanded by General der Kavallerie Erick Hansen
  - 22nd Infantry Division
  - 24th Infantry Division
  - 50th Infantry Division
  - 132nd Infantry Division
- XXX Corps - commanded by General der Infanterie Hans von Salmuth
  - 28th Light Division
  - 72nd Infantry Division
  - 170th Infantry Division
- Romanian Mountain Corps - commanded by Major General Gheorghe Avramescu
  - 1st Mountain Division (Romanian)
  - 4th Mountain Division (Romanian)
  - 18th Infantry Division (Romanian)

== 11th SS Panzer Army ==
In November 1944, the ordinal number 11 was once again given to a new field army under the command of Felix Steiner, alternatively known as "11th Army", "11th Panzer Army", or, most frequently in the English language, "11th SS Panzer Army".

== Commanders ==
No.	Portrait	Commander	Took office	Left office	Time in office
1	Eugen Ritter von Schobert	Generaloberst; Eugen Ritter von Schobert (1883–1941)	5 October 1940	12 September 1941 †	342 days
2	Erich von Manstein	Generalfeldmarschall; Erich von Manstein (1887–1973)	12 September 1941	21 November 1942	1 year, 70 days
3	Felix Steiner	SS-Obergruppenführer; Felix Steiner (1896–1966)	28 January 1945	5 March 1945	36 days
4	Otto Hitzfeld	General der Infanterie; Otto Hitzfeld (1898–1990)	2 April 1945	8 April 1945	6 days
5	Walther Lucht	General der Artillerie; Walther Lucht (1882–1949)	8 April 1945	23 April 1945	15 days

== See also ==
- 11th Army (German Empire) for the equivalent formation in World War I
