= 11th SS Panzer Army =

- Active: November 1944 – February 1945
- Country: Nazi Germany
- Branch: German Army (Schutzstaffel) Waffen-SS
- Type: Panzer
- Role: Armoured warfare
- Size: Army
- Engagements: World War II: Eastern Front; Operation Solstice

Commanders
- Notable commanders: Felix Steiner

The 11th SS Panzer Army (SS-Panzer-Armeeoberkommando 11) was little more than a paper army formed in February 1945 by Heinrich Himmler while he was commander of Army Group Vistula. (The army was officially listed as the 11th Army but it was also known as SS Panzer-Armeeoberkommando 11 and is often referred to in English sources as the 11th SS Panzer Army.)

Military historian Antony Beevor writes that when the 11th SS Panzer Army was created the available units at best could constitute a corps, but 'panzer army', observed Hans-Georg Eismann, 'has a better ring to it'. It also allowed Himmler to promote SS officers to senior staff and field commands within the formation. Obergruppenführer Felix Steiner was named its commander.

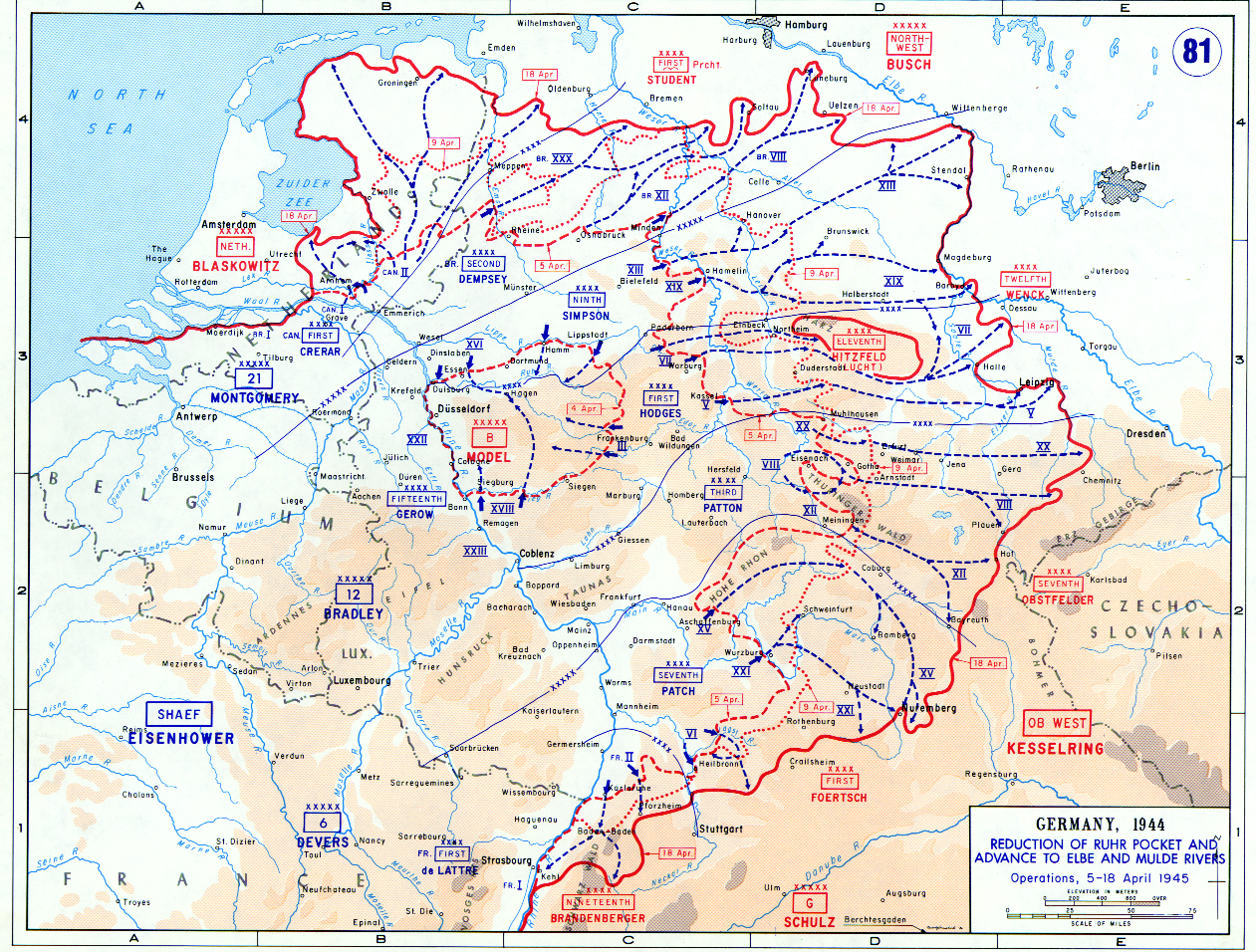
Situation 18 April 1945. With the complete destruction of Army Group B in the Ruhr Pocket by that date, 11th Army in the Harz Mountains (center right) became the only large cohesive formation on the western front capable of offering significant resistance.

After taking part in Operation Solstice east of the Oder River in February 1945, the army was assigned to OB West and reorganized in March 1945. Many of the units formerly subordinated to the 11th SS Panzer Army were transferred to the 3rd Panzer Army and other units were assigned to the 11th Army for operations against the Western Allies.

In early April, the 11th Army was assigned to strike west from Kassel to break the ring encircling the Ruhr pocket. After launching a few small hopeless and unsuccessful attacks against the American 3rd Army, the 11th Army retreated to the Harz Mountains

After defending the Weser River and the Harz Mountains, the 11th surrendered to the Western Allies on 21 April.

== Orders of battle ==
=== February 1945 ===
By 5 February the 11th SS Panzer Army, subordinated to Army Group Vistula, had the following units assigned to it:

- Tettau Corps Group:
  - Köslin
  - Bärwalde
- X SS Corps
  - 5th Jäger-Division
  - Division Nr 402
- Munzel Corps Group:
  - Führer Grenadier Division
  - Führer Escort Division
- III (Germanic) SS Panzer Corps:
  - 281st Infantry Division
  - 23rd SS Volunteer Panzergrenadier Division Nederland
  - Division Voigt
  - 11th SS Volunteer Panzergrenadier Division Nordland
  - 27th SS Volunteer Grenadier Division Langemarck
- XXXIX Panzer Corps
  - 4th SS Polizei Panzergrenadier Division
  - 10th SS Panzer Division Frundsberg
  - 28th SS Volunteer Grenadier Division Wallonien
  - Panzer Division Holstein
- HQ, Wehrkreis II as corps-level field command (stellv. II):
  - Swinemünde Defensive Region
  - Division Deneke
  - 9th Parachute Division
- Direct army command
  - 163rd Infantry Division

=== March 1945 ===
By 1 March the 11th SS Panzer Army, subordinated to Army Group Vistula, had no units assigned to it.

=== April 1945 ===
By 12 April the 11th SS Panzer Army was directly subordinated to OB West and had the following units assigned to it.

- LXVII Army Corps:
  - Kampfgruppe Fellner
  - Division Ettner
  - Division Heidenreich
  - Division Grosskreuz
- Stellv. IX:
  - 26th Volksgrenadier Division
  - 326th Volksgrenadier Division
- LXVI Army Corps:
  - 277th Volksgrenadier Division
  - SS Brigade Westfalen
  - 9th Panzer Division
  - 116th Panzer Division

== See also ==
- 11th Army, the official German Army name for the army. The 11th Army also existed before this last reincarnation as an army that fought on the Eastern Front earlier in the war.
- Army Detachment Steiner fought in the Battle of Berlin, and because Steiner commanded that paper army it can easily be confused with the 11th SS Panzer Army.
