= Operation Solstice =

German offensive in World War II

- Part of Eastern Front of World War II
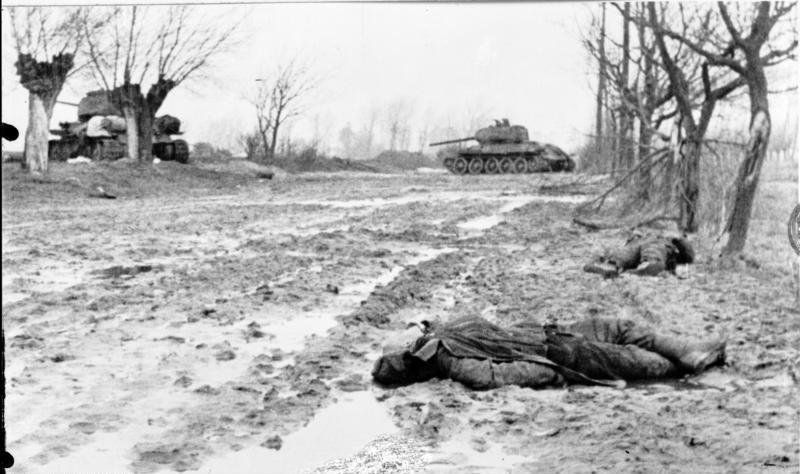
- Soviet casualties and destroyed T-34s in South Pomerania, February 20, 1945
Date	15–18 February 1945
Location	Stargard, Pomerania, Germany 53°12′00″N 15°01′12″E
Result	See aftermath

Belligerents
Germany	Soviet Union

Commanders and leaders
Walther Wenck; Felix Steiner	Georgy Zhukov

Strength
7 panzer and panzergrenadier divisions	1st Belorussian Front

Operation Solstice (German: Unternehmen Sonnenwende), also known as Unternehmen Husarenritt or the Stargard tank battle, was one of the last German armoured offensive operations on the Eastern Front in World War II.

It was originally planned as a major offensive but was executed as a limited attack, due to hasty planning by the Germans and it being partially compromised by Soviet military intelligence. Intended to relieve the city of Küstrin, Sonnenwende was launched on 15 February 1945 from Stargard, Pomerania. By 18 February, the Soviet 1st Belorussian Front led by Georgy Zhukov had defeated the attack, prompting the Germans to call off the offensive. Despite its failure, the operation forced the Soviet High Command (Stavka) to postpone the planned attack on Berlin from February to April, focusing forces on the East Pomeranian Offensive, launched on 24 February and not concluded until 4 April.

== Planning ==
The operation took place in response to the Soviet advance on Berlin in early 1945. Launched January 12, 1945, the Soviet Vistula-Oder Offensive had ripped open a gap hundreds of kilometers long in German defensive lines, and the Soviets had subsequently pushed from the Vistula River to the Oder River. As the Soviet advance to the west reached its farthest point, its apex narrowed, leaving long northern and southern flanks into which retreating German formations had moved and along which the Germans were attempting to reestablish a cohesive defensive line.

General Heinz Guderian had originally planned to execute a major offensive against the 1st Belorussian Front, cutting off the leading elements of Georgy Zhukov's forces east of the Oder. The Soviet forces were to be attacked from Stargard (Pomerania) in the north as well as from Glogau (Silesia) and Guben (Brandenburg) in the south. In order to carry out these plans, he requested that the Courland Pocket be evacuated to make available the divisions trapped there, removed troops from Italy and Norway, and involved Sepp Dietrich's 6th Panzer Army which had been intended for counter-attacks in Hungary. In a meeting with Guderian, Hitler insisted that Courland be held and that the army continue with its planned attacks in Hungary; the meeting rapidly degenerated into a heated and farcical argument.

After agreeing on a more limited counter-offensive, Hitler and Guderian then proceeded to have an even more heated argument when Guderian insisted that Walther Wenck direct the offensive rather than Heinrich Himmler (the commander of Army Group Vistula), who Guderian argued had lacked the experience nor the staff to control the attack. Hitler, despite "almost screaming", according to Guderian's account, eventually gave in on this point.

=== Operational goals ===
In its final form, Operation Solstice consisted of a more limited counter-attack than had been originally planned by the three corps of the Eleventh SS Panzer Army, which was being assembled in Pomerania, against the spearheads of the 1st Belorussian Front. The German forces would first attack along a fifty-kilometre front around Stargard south-eastwards towards Arnswalde where a small garrison had been encircled with their ultimate objective being the relief of Küstrin.

The Wehrmacht originally codenamed the operation Husarenritt ("Hussar ride"), implying that it was unlikely to amount to more than a raid, but the SS insisted on the name Sonnenwende.

=== Soviet intelligence ===
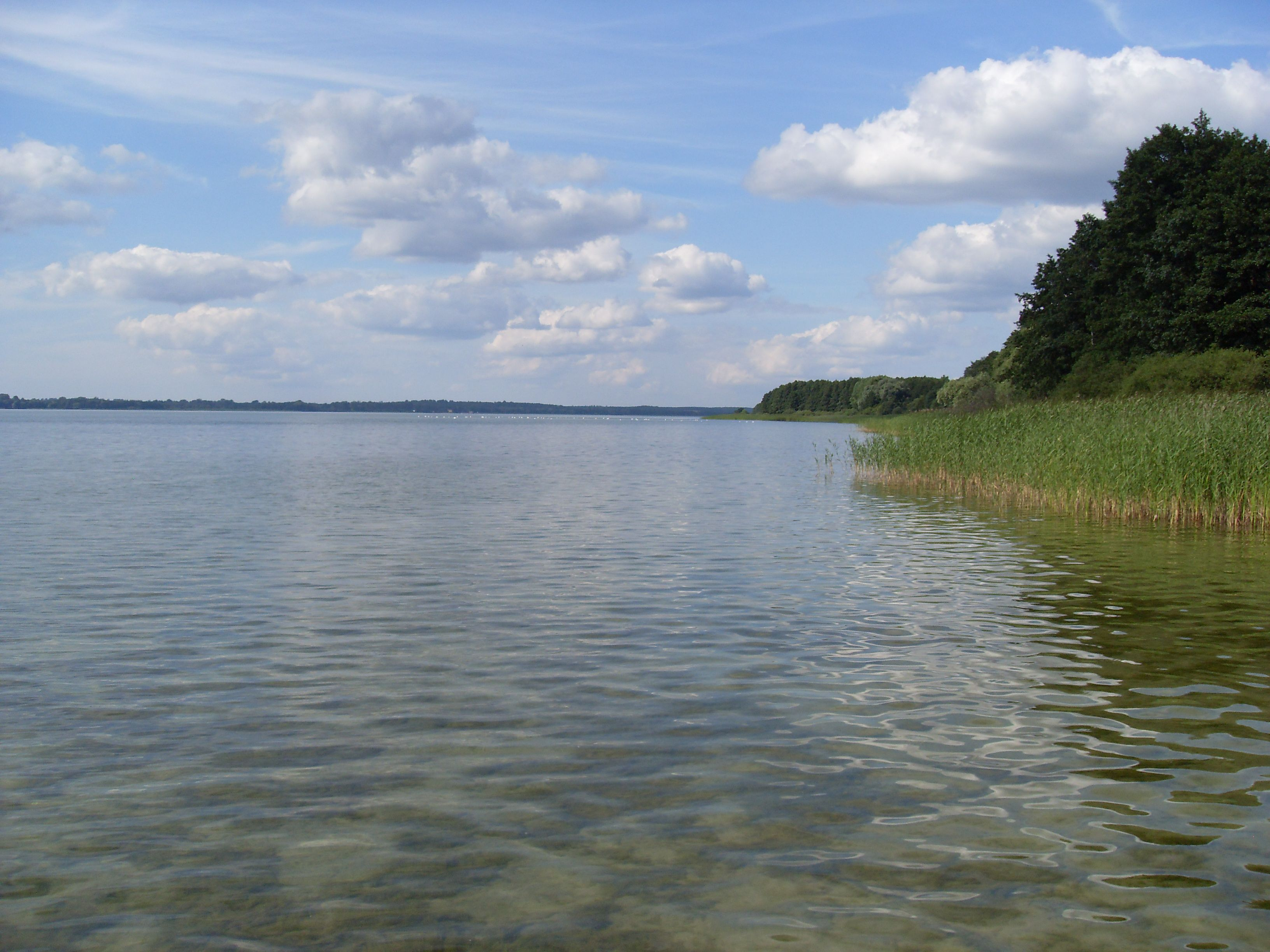
View along the shore of Lake Madüsee (Miedwie)

Zhukov had been made aware of a buildup of German forces opposing his 61st and 2nd Guards Tank Armies, but did not have information as to the exact timing and nature of the attack. The Stavka of the Supreme Main Command had noted with concern that while the Germans had moved thirteen divisions between the main Soviet forces and Berlin, thirty-three divisions had concentrated in Pomerania, lending credence to the possibility of a German strike from Pomerania into the exposed northern flank of the 1st Belorussian Front.

== Deployments ==
=== Wehrmacht ===
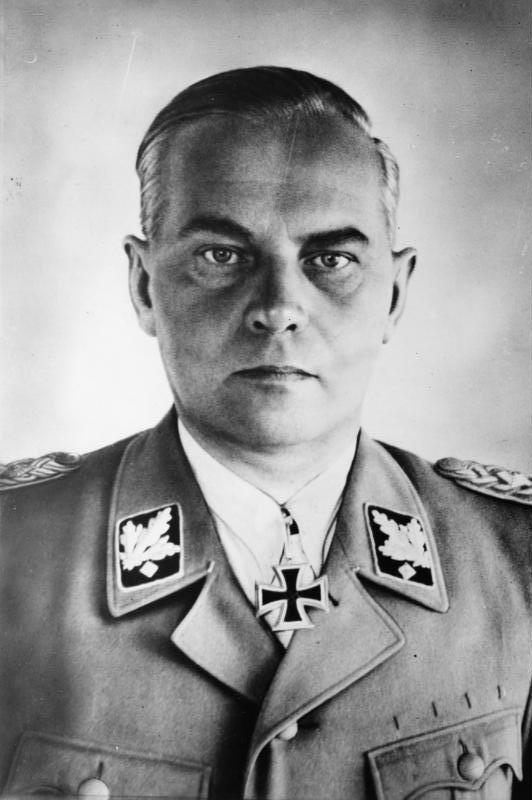
Felix Steiner

Over 1,200 tanks were allocated to the offensive, but no trains were available to transport them. In addition, due to serious shortages, only three days' ammunition and fuel were immediately available. German forces had also suffered heavy losses during the January combat in East Prussia and Poland. German sources admitted to 198,000 dead and missing for the first two months of 1945 in the region between the Baltic Sea and the Carpathian Mountains.

Soviet sources state that operations by the 1st Ukrainian and Belorussian Fronts during the Vistula-Oder Offensive alone resulted in the deaths of 150,000 German troops. In Deutsche militärische Verluste im Zweiten Weltkrieg, author Rüdiger Overmans estimates overall German military deaths in January 1945 were 451,742 and believes up to 2/3 of these losses (some 300,000) occurred in combat on the eastern front. While the Germans were able to make good some of the losses through measures such as the mass mobilization of Volkssturm, the German forces in the east had clearly suffered both significant quantitative and qualitative losses as a result of the two Soviet major offensives in January 1945.

Army	Corps	Division	Notes
11th SS Panzer Army Gen F. Steiner	XXXIX Panzer; Lt Gen K. Decker On German right	Panzer Division Holstein	29 Panzer IV at formation; 17 further Panzer IV sent to unit 9 - 11 Feb 1945
11th SS Panzer Army Gen F. Steiner	XXXIX Panzer; Lt Gen K. Decker On German right	10th SS Pz Div	38 Panzer IV, 53 Panther tanks on 8 Feb 1945
11th SS Panzer Army Gen F. Steiner	XXXIX Panzer; Lt Gen K. Decker On German right	4th SS PzG Div	
11th SS Panzer Army Gen F. Steiner	XXXIX Panzer; Lt Gen K. Decker On German right	28th SS Inf Div	20 Hetzer at start of Feb 1945
11th SS Panzer Army Gen F. Steiner	III SS Panzer; Lt Gen M. Unrein In German center	11th SS PzG Div	Elements of 503rd SS Heavy Tank Battalion attached: 12 Tiger II on 27 Jan 1945
11th SS Panzer Army Gen F. Steiner	III SS Panzer; Lt Gen M. Unrein In German center	23rd SS PzG Div	20 Hetzer on/about 10 Feb 1945
11th SS Panzer Army Gen F. Steiner	III SS Panzer; Lt Gen M. Unrein In German center	27th SS Inf Div	10 Hetzer at start of Feb 1945
11th SS Panzer Army Gen F. Steiner	III SS Panzer; Lt Gen M. Unrein In German center	Führer-Begleit PzG Div	> 15 Panzer IV, 23 Jagdpanzer IV/70(A) on 2 Feb 1945; 30 Panthers sent to unit 8 - 10 Feb 1945
11th SS Panzer Army Gen F. Steiner	Korpsgruppe Munzel; Maj Gen O. Munzel On German left	Führer-Grenadier PzG Div	5 Panzer IV, 18 Panther, 13 Jagdpanzer IV/70 on 27 Jan 1945; 10 Jagdpanther and 16 Panther sent to unit 15 - 17 Feb 1945
11th SS Panzer Army Gen F. Steiner	Korpsgruppe Munzel; Maj Gen O. Munzel On German left	163rd Inf Div	At least 9,000 men still en route to Pomerania from Norway via Denmark on 15 Feb 1945
11th SS Panzer Army Gen F. Steiner	Korpsgruppe Munzel; Maj Gen O. Munzel On German left	281st Inf Div	
11th SS Panzer Army Gen F. Steiner	Korpsgruppe Munzel; Maj Gen O. Munzel On German left	104th Antitank Brig	

=== Red Army ===
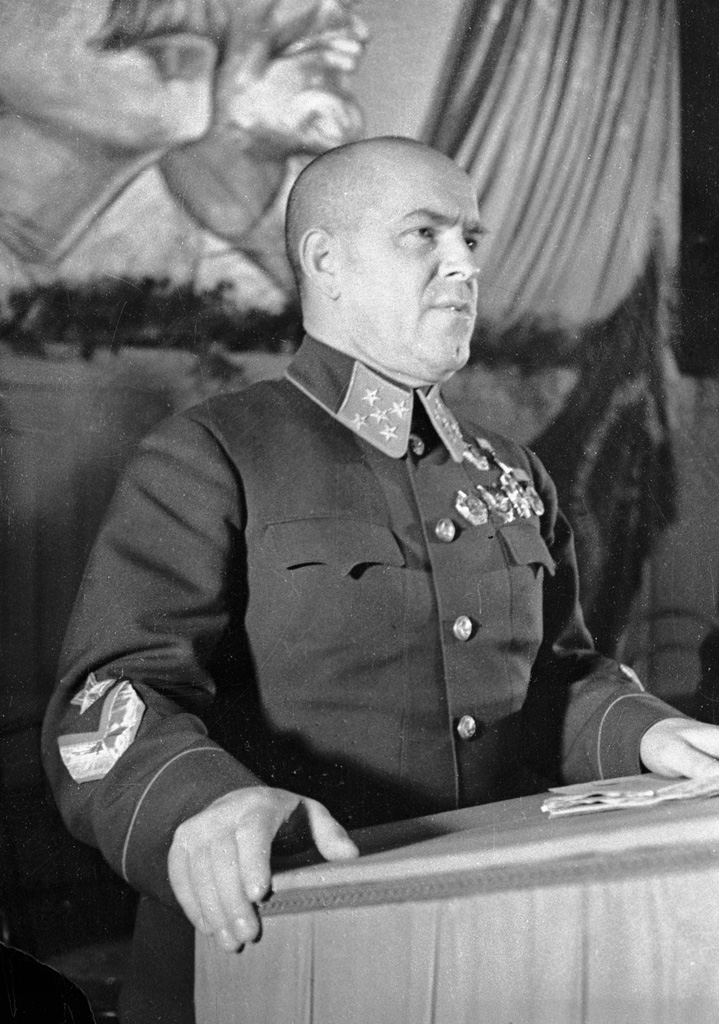
Marshal Georgy Zhukov

While the 1st and 2nd Belorussian Fronts were impressively large formations, the Soviet forces had also suffered serious losses in the Vistula-Oder Offensive. At the beginning of February 1945, the strength of rifle divisions in the 1st BRF averaged around 4,000 troops and those of the 2nd BRF between 3,000 and 4,000. Soviet army strength was further weakened by the need to besiege encircled groups of German soldiers (Festungen – German: "fortresses") in Elbing, Posen, Deutsch Krone, and Schneidemühl. Armored strength was also weakened by the recent offensive operations; the 2nd BRF fielded only 297 well-worn tanks early in February 1945. During the period January 12 – February 3, 1945, the 1st BRF suffered 77,342 casualties (7.5% of its assigned strength) while during the East Prussian Offensive of January 13 – February 10, 1945, the 2nd BRF took 159,490 casualties (18% of assigned strength). In the same periods, the 1st Belorussian and Ukrainian Fronts lost 1,267 armored fighting vehicles while the 2nd and 3rd Belorussian Fronts lost 3,525. Gun and mortar losses for the two groups of fronts were 374 and 1,644, respectively. To compound their difficulties, the Soviets faced supply bottlenecks as well as increased German air activity, resulting in increased unit requests for anti-aircraft weapons.

Front	Army	Subordinate unit	Notes
1st Belorussian Front (-) Marshal G. Zhukov	2nd Guards Tank; ColGen S. Bogdanov On Soviet left	9th Gds Tank Corps	
1st Belorussian Front (-) Marshal G. Zhukov	2nd Guards Tank; ColGen S. Bogdanov On Soviet left	12th Gds Tank Corps	
1st Belorussian Front (-) Marshal G. Zhukov	2nd Guards Tank; ColGen S. Bogdanov On Soviet left	1st Mech Corps	
1st Belorussian Front (-) Marshal G. Zhukov	61st Army; LtGen P. Belov On Soviet right	9th Gds Rifle Corps	
1st Belorussian Front (-) Marshal G. Zhukov	61st Army; LtGen P. Belov On Soviet right	80th Rifle Corps	
1st Belorussian Front (-) Marshal G. Zhukov	61st Army; LtGen P. Belov On Soviet right	89th Rifle Corps	
1st Belorussian Front (-) Marshal G. Zhukov	61st Army; LtGen P. Belov On Soviet right	6th Art Div	
1st Belorussian Front (-) Marshal G. Zhukov	61st Army; LtGen P. Belov On Soviet right	533rd Antitank Regt	
1st Belorussian Front (-) Marshal G. Zhukov	47th Army; Lt Gen F. Perhorovich Moving west from the area of Deutsch-Krone	77th Rifle Corps	
1st Belorussian Front (-) Marshal G. Zhukov	47th Army; Lt Gen F. Perhorovich Moving west from the area of Deutsch-Krone	125th Rifle Corps	
1st Belorussian Front (-) Marshal G. Zhukov	47th Army; Lt Gen F. Perhorovich Moving west from the area of Deutsch-Krone	129th Rifle Corps	
1st Belorussian Front (-) Marshal G. Zhukov	47th Army; Lt Gen F. Perhorovich Moving west from the area of Deutsch-Krone	22nd Art Div	
1st Belorussian Front (-) Marshal G. Zhukov	47th Army; Lt Gen F. Perhorovich Moving west from the area of Deutsch-Krone	4th Gds Antitank Brig	
1st Belorussian Front (-) Marshal G. Zhukov	47th Army; Lt Gen F. Perhorovich Moving west from the area of Deutsch-Krone	163rd Antitank Regt	
1st Belorussian Front (-) Marshal G. Zhukov	3rd Shock; Maj Gen N. Simoniak Reinforcement; moving from area of Jastrow	12th Guards Rifle Corps	
1st Belorussian Front (-) Marshal G. Zhukov	3rd Shock; Maj Gen N. Simoniak Reinforcement; moving from area of Jastrow	7th Rifle Corps	
1st Belorussian Front (-) Marshal G. Zhukov	3rd Shock; Maj Gen N. Simoniak Reinforcement; moving from area of Jastrow	79th Rifle Corps	
1st Belorussian Front (-) Marshal G. Zhukov	3rd Shock; Maj Gen N. Simoniak Reinforcement; moving from area of Jastrow	163rd Gds Antitank Regt	
1st Belorussian Front (-) Marshal G. Zhukov	1st Guards Tank; Col Gen M. Katukov Reinforcement; moving from area of Frankfurt an der Oder	8th Gds Mech Corps	
1st Belorussian Front (-) Marshal G. Zhukov	1st Guards Tank; Col Gen M. Katukov Reinforcement; moving from area of Frankfurt an der Oder	11th Gds Tank Corps	
1st Belorussian Front (-) Marshal G. Zhukov	1st Guards Tank; Col Gen M. Katukov Reinforcement; moving from area of Frankfurt an der Oder	41st Gds Antitank Brig	

== The offensive ==
Not all of the German units, which had to be reinforced across the bridges at Stettin were ready on the planned start date of February 15. Nevertheless, a part of the central corps, the SS Division Nordland, attacked towards Arnswalde that day. Initially the offensive was successful; the opposing forces of 61st Army were taken by surprise and the German spearhead reached the besieged outpost of Arnswalde and relieved its garrison.

A general attack opened the following day. The central corridor to Arnswalde was widened by the III SS Panzer Corps, pushing part of the Soviet front eight to twelve kilometers back. However, the attack by the XXXIX Panzer Corps was unable to reach the Plöne Lake due to resistance by the Soviet 2nd Guards Tank Army, stalling some 70 kilometers from Küstrin after pushing the Soviets out of Sallenthin and Muscherin, reoccupying some land on the eastern shore of Lake Madü, and recapturing Pyritz. Gruppe Munzel pushed some four kilometers to Liebenow, while the III SS Panzer Corps advanced about a kilometer to Reetz. Numbers of Soviet tanks and antitank guns were destroyed by German Tiger II heavy tanks, but the German heavy tanks also took losses. In general, German progress was hindered because of strong Soviet resistance. On February 17, General Wenck, commander of the offensive, was seriously injured in a car accident. While being driven back from a briefing in Berlin, he took over driving from his driver (who had been on duty and awake for 48 hours) and then himself fell asleep at the wheel. He was replaced by Hans Krebs, but command initiative had already been lost. Later that day, Zhukov threw the 3rd Shock Army, which had redeployed from the area of Jastrow, into a counter-attack and the German offensive stalled.

Army Group Vistula halted Sonnenwende on February 18. On February 19, Zhukov initiated a counter-offensive aimed at the capture of Stettin using the 61st and the 2nd Guards Tank Armies as well as the 7th Guards Cavalry Corps. However, it stalled in the heavy street fighting during the re-capture of Arnswalde. There was no immediate German withdrawal, but the German command decided on February 21 to withdraw the headquarters of the XXXIX Panzer Corps as well as the Führer-Grenadier, Führer-Begleit, Holstein, and 10th SS Panzer Divisions westward behind Army Group Center, practically ensuring that eastern Pomerania would fall to the Soviets. Zhukov's commitment of the 70th Army into an attack on February 23 spurred a retreat with the German forces losing or abandoning many tanks. On February 24, Marshal Rokossovsky's 2nd Belorussian Front renewed the offensive into Pomerania, opening a 60-kilometer (37 mi) wide gap in German lines west of Grudziądz and moving almost fifty kilometers (31 miles) forward, further reducing the cohesion of German defenses.

== Outcome ==
Despite the initial gains, the operation was a complete failure. However, the operation convinced the Soviets to postpone their attack on Berlin while Pomerania was cleared in the East Pomeranian Offensive.

== See also ==
- History of Pomerania (1933–1945)
