= 103rd SS Heavy Panzer Battalion =

Waffen-SS heavy tank battalion

103rd Heavy SS Panzer Battalion
- schwere SS-Panzerabteilung 101
- Active: August 1944 - May 1945
- Country: Nazi Germany
- Branch: Waffen-SS
- Type: Panzer
- Role: Armoured warfare
- Size: Battalion, up to 45 tanks
- Part of: III (Germanic) SS Panzer Corps

103rd Heavy SS Panzer Battalion (German: "schwere SS-Panzerabteilung 103) was a German heavy tank battalion of the Waffen-SS during World War II.

== Operational history ==
The unit was originally formed on 1 July 1943 as the II Battalion, 11th SS Panzer Regiment and sent to Yugoslavia to fight as infantry; however, at the end of November, the battalion was converted back to armoured.

The Battalion was then issued six Tiger I tanks in February for training, but then ordered to give them to another unit in March 1944. Another six Tiger Is arrived at the training grounds on 26 May and four more in August. On 20 October, all ten Tigers were given to the training unit and the 103rd was outfitted with the Tiger II before being ordered to the Eastern Front, as part of the III (Germanic) SS Panzer Corps.

On 14 November 1944 the unit was redesignated 503rd Heavy SS Panzer Battalion. It had a total of 39 (instead of the full complement of 45) Tiger IIs and was loaded onto trains on 27 January 1945, and sent to the Eastern Front in the Army Group Vistula sector. By 15 April 1945, the 503rd reported a total of 12 Tiger IIs, of which 10 were still operational. The 503rd ended the war fighting in the Battle of Berlin as part of Kampfgruppe Mohnke.
