= Volunteer Legion Netherlands =

German infantry division

- Vrijwilligerslegioen Nederland
- Emblem with "arrow-tipped" Odal SS-rune
- Active: 1941–1945
- Country: Nazi Germany
- Branch: (Schutzstaffel) Waffen-SS
- Type: Panzergrenadier
- Size: 6,000
- Motto: Conqueror the Dutch
- Colors: Orange, red, Blue
- Engagements: World War II; Eastern Front; Nazi security warfare; Battle for Narva Bridgehead; Operation Sonnenwende

The Volunteer Legion Netherlands (Dutch: Vrijwilligerslegioen Nederland) was a collaborationist military formation recruited in the German-occupied Netherlands during World War II. It was formed in the aftermath of the German invasion of the Soviet Union and fought on the Eastern Front in the Waffen SS alongside similar formations from other parts of German-occupied Western Europe. It was the largest Dutch SS unit.

The Volunteer Legion was renamed the 4th SS Panzer Grenadier Brigade Netherlands in October 1943. It was officially re-designated as a division in February 1945 but never grew to larger than a brigade.

== Background ==
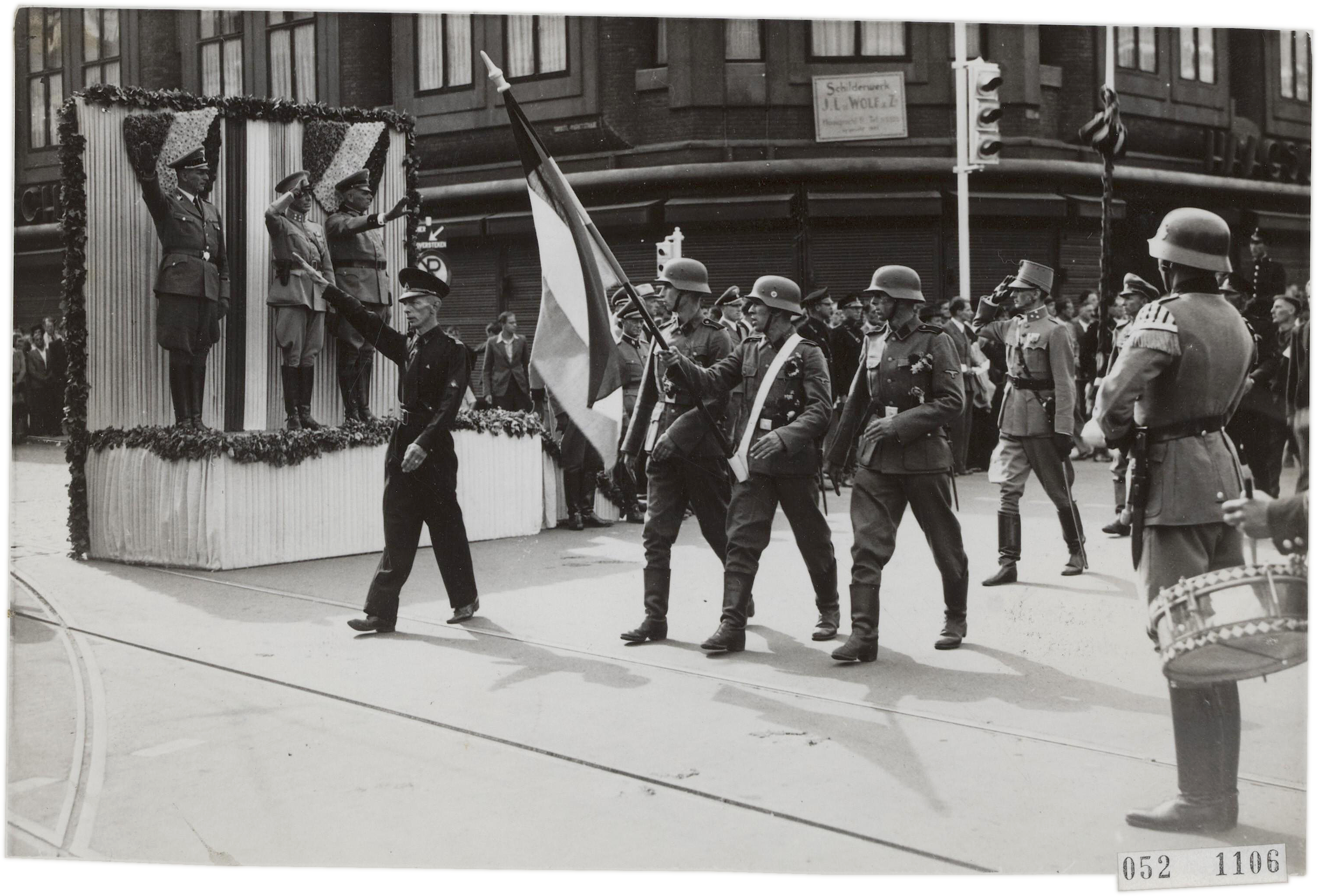
A detachment from the Volunteer Legion parades at The Hague in 1941

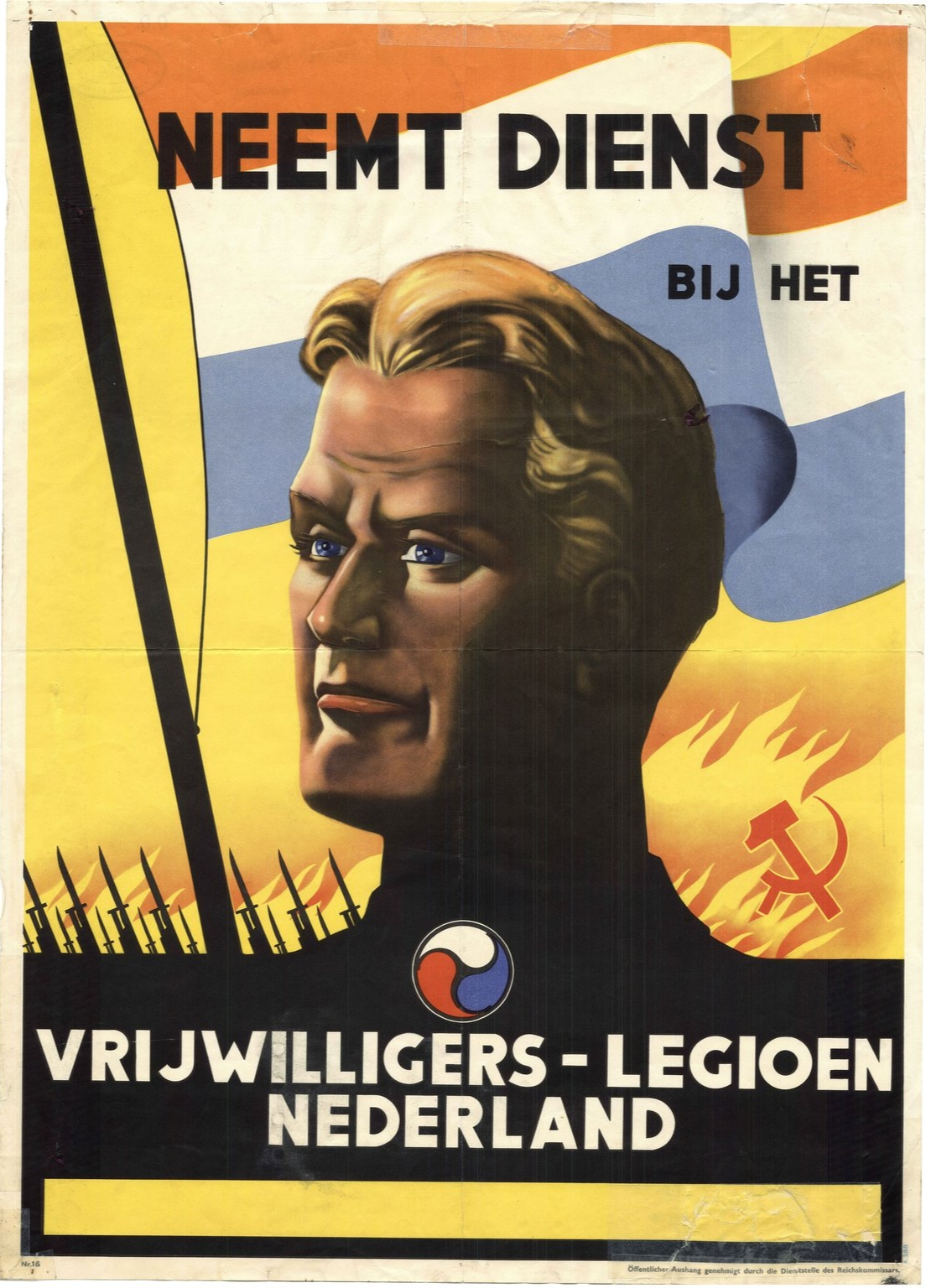
Recruitment poster for Volunteer Legion Netherlands

When the Germans invaded in May 1940, several political parties in the Netherlands sympathized with the authoritarian and anti-democratic ideals of Nazi Germany. The most important was the National Socialist Movement in the Netherlands (Nationaal-Socialistische Beweging in Nederland, NSB), led by Anton Mussert, founded in 1931 on the example of the Nazi Party in Germany. It initially gained limited interest from the Dutch lower-middle class but never gained widespread support. It polled only three percent in 1939.

After the invasion of Poland in 1939, Heinrich Himmler, head of the SS, sought to expand the Waffen-SS with "Germanic" volunteers from other countries. The enrollment began in April 1940 with the creation of two regiments: the Waffen-SS Regiment Nordland (for Danish, Norwegian and Swedish volunteers), and the Waffen-SS Regiment Westland (for Dutch and Flemish volunteers).

Recruitment in the Netherlands was given an air of respectability by the support of Dutch General Staff officer Lieutenant-General Hendrik Seyffardt. By April 1941, volunteers began arriving in Hamburg. By July 1941, the Dutch were organized into SS Volunteer Unit Niederlande. The formation was the size of a reinforced infantry battalion, with five motorized companies. The unit was again redesignated, this time as SS Volunteer Legion Niederlande under General Seyffardt. In November 1941, the legion was ordered to the front near Leningrad, under the overall command of Army Group North Rear Area.

== Northern Russia and Yugoslavia ==
The Legion arrived at the Volkhov River in mid-January 1942 and was engaged in rear-security activities. In late June, it was transferred north in support of units at the Siege of Leningrad. The unit was then to take part in an offensive Operation Nordlicht, which was ultimately called off to deal with the Soviet Sinyavino Offensive. The Legion was then moved south near Lake Ladoga. At the end of 1942, it was merged with the 2nd SS Infantry Brigade.

In January 1943, Dutch troops were heavily involved in defending against Soviet attempts to lift the siege at Leningrad. One 19-year old Dutch gun crew leader, Gerardus Mooyman, destroyed 23 Russian tanks with his Pak 40 in about a month of fighting. He became the first foreigner to be awarded Knight’s Cross. On 6 February, General Seyffardt, while campaigning for new recruits in Amsterdam, was assassinated by the Dutch resistance.

In April 1943, the unit was sent to Germany to be reformed as the SS Volunteer Panzergrenadier Brigade Nederland. The brigade was to consist of two Panzergrenadier regiments under the command of SS-Oberführer Jürgen Wagner. In September 1943, the Brigade was sent to the Independent State of Croatia (Yugoslavia) to join SS-Obergruppenführer Felix Steiner's III SS Panzer Corps currently forming in the area. Upon its arrival, the Brigade received 1,500 Dutch recruits, drawn from the SS Division Wiking. During its time there, elements of the brigade were engaged in rear-security operations. During this period, the brigade was redesignated 4th SS Volunteer Panzergrenadier Brigade Nederland. At this time, its strength stood at 9,342 men.

== Retreat ==
On 25 December 1943, the brigade was transferred, along with Steiner's SS Corps, to Oranienbaum, Russia in Army Group North's sector. The corps was deployed to the area near Oranienbaum as part of the 18th Army. The Soviet Krasnoye Selo–Ropsha Offensive cut through the weak infantry units formed out of the 9th and 10th Luftwaffe Field Divisions. The unit, alongside the SS Division Nordland, soon retreated to avoid encirclement by General Leonid A. Govorov's Leningrad Front. In the face of the Soviet Kingisepp–Gdov Offensive, the unit retreated to the Narva River in Estonia, where it took part in the Battle of Narva deployed on the Ivangorod bridgehead.

The launch of Operation Bagration on 22 June threatened the German positions. On 23 July, Steiner ordered a withdrawal to the Tannenberg Line. The unit was destroyed from the air on 24 July, with only a few personnel reaching the Tannenberg Line a week later. The regiment was ordered to be reformed at Schlochau. In September, Leon Degrelle's battle group from SS Brigade Wallonien was placed under the command of Nederland.

The unit arrived in the area near Gumi-Wolmar in mid-October. The Soviet forces cut off Army Group North in the Courland area, creating the Courland Pocket. During the unit's presence in Courland, Wagner ordered the reprisal executions of an unknown number of civilians. On 26 January 1945, the brigade received orders to evacuate the pocket by sea and report to the Swinemünde-Stettin area to participate in the defence of the Oder line. The brigade arrived in German territory on 4 February.

== End of war and aftermath ==
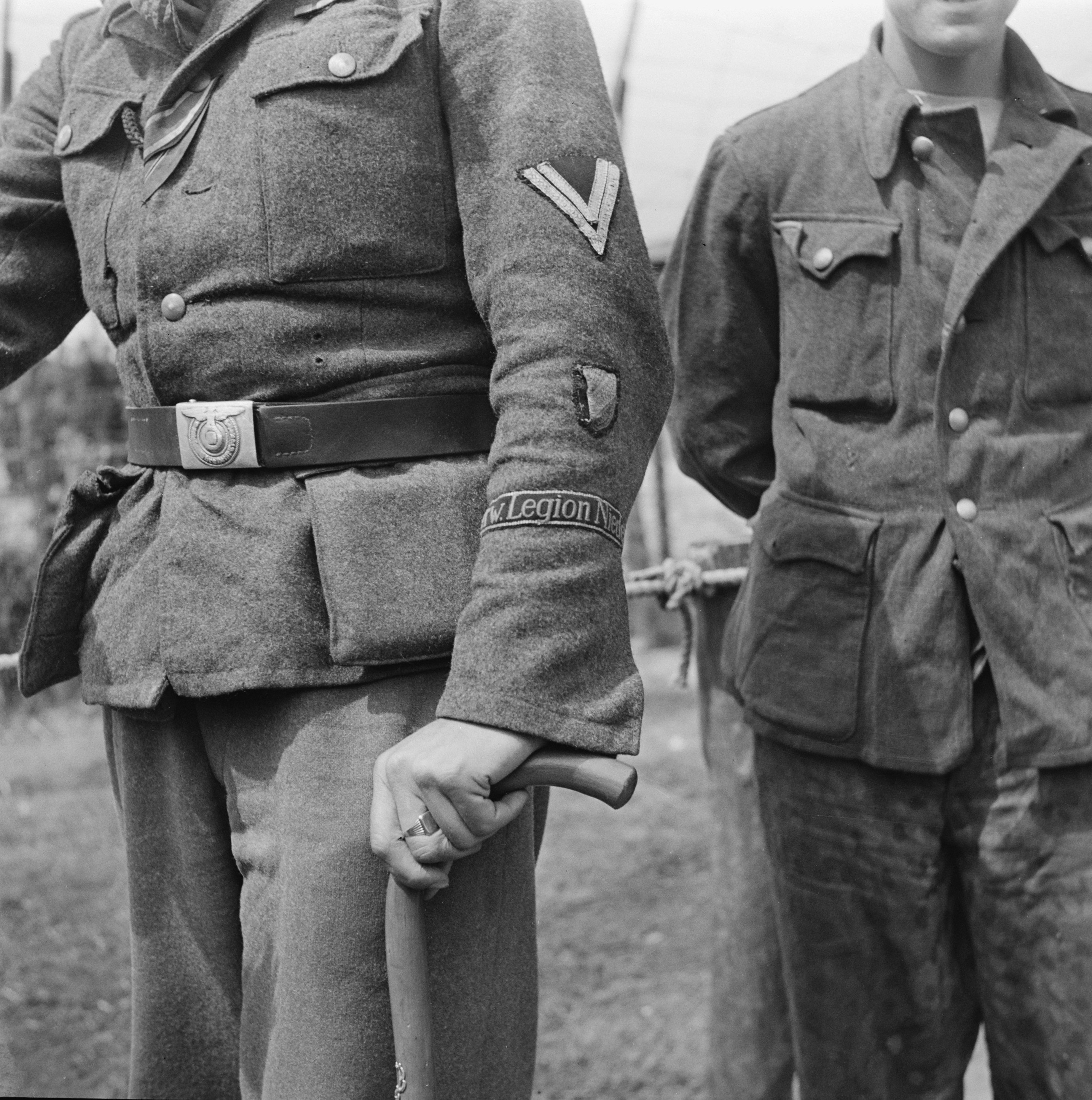
Man in a uniform of the Freiwilligen Legion Niederlanden shortly after World War II.

On 10 February, the brigade was redesignated 23rd SS Volunteer Panzergrenadier Division Nederland, with a strength of 1,000 men. The new division was attached to Steiner's Eleventh SS Panzer Army, defending the Northern Oder region. The Nederland took part in the abortive Operation Sonnenwende, and the battles near Altdamm in February 1945.

In April 1945, the division was split into two battle groups. The Soviet offensive of 16 April had broken the German lines by 25 April, cutting the lines of communication between the two units. One of the battle groups broke out to the west, surrendering to the US Army. The other battle group was pushed south by the Soviet offensive, into the area around Halbe. The remnants of the unit were absorbed into Kampfgruppe Vieweger of the 15th Waffen Grenadier Division of the SS (1st Latvian). The unit was destroyed in the Halbe pocket.

After the war, the unit personnel were tried in the Netherlands, with several death sentences handed down. Wagner was extradited to Yugoslavia in 1947 to stand trial for war crimes. Found guilty before the Yugoslav military tribunal, he was sentenced to death and executed on 27 June 1947.

== Commanders ==
- SS-Sturmbannführer Herbert Garthe (? November 1941 – ? February 1942)
- SS-Oberführer Otto Reich (? February 1942 – 1 April 1942)
- SS-Obersturmbannführer Arved Theuermann (1 April 1942 – ?)
- SS-Standartenführer Josef Fitzthum (? – ?)
- SS-Brigadeführer Jürgen Wagner (20 April 1944 – 1 May 1945)

== See also ==
- List of Waffen-SS units
- Ranks and insignia of the Waffen-SS
- Waffen-SS foreign volunteers and conscripts
