= Waffen Grenadier Regiment of the SS (1st Romanian) =

Waffen-SS infantry division

- German: Waffen-Grenadier Regiment der SS (Rumänisches Nr. 1)
- Active: 1944–16 April 1945
- Country: Nazi Germany
- Branch: Waffen-SS
- Type: Infantry
- Size: Division
- Nickname: Rumänisches Nr. 1
- Engagements: World War II: Battle of the Oder–Neisse; Battle of Berlin

Commanders
- Notable commanders: Gustav Wegner

Insignia
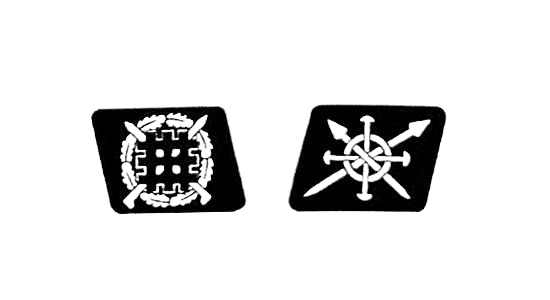
- Collar tabs

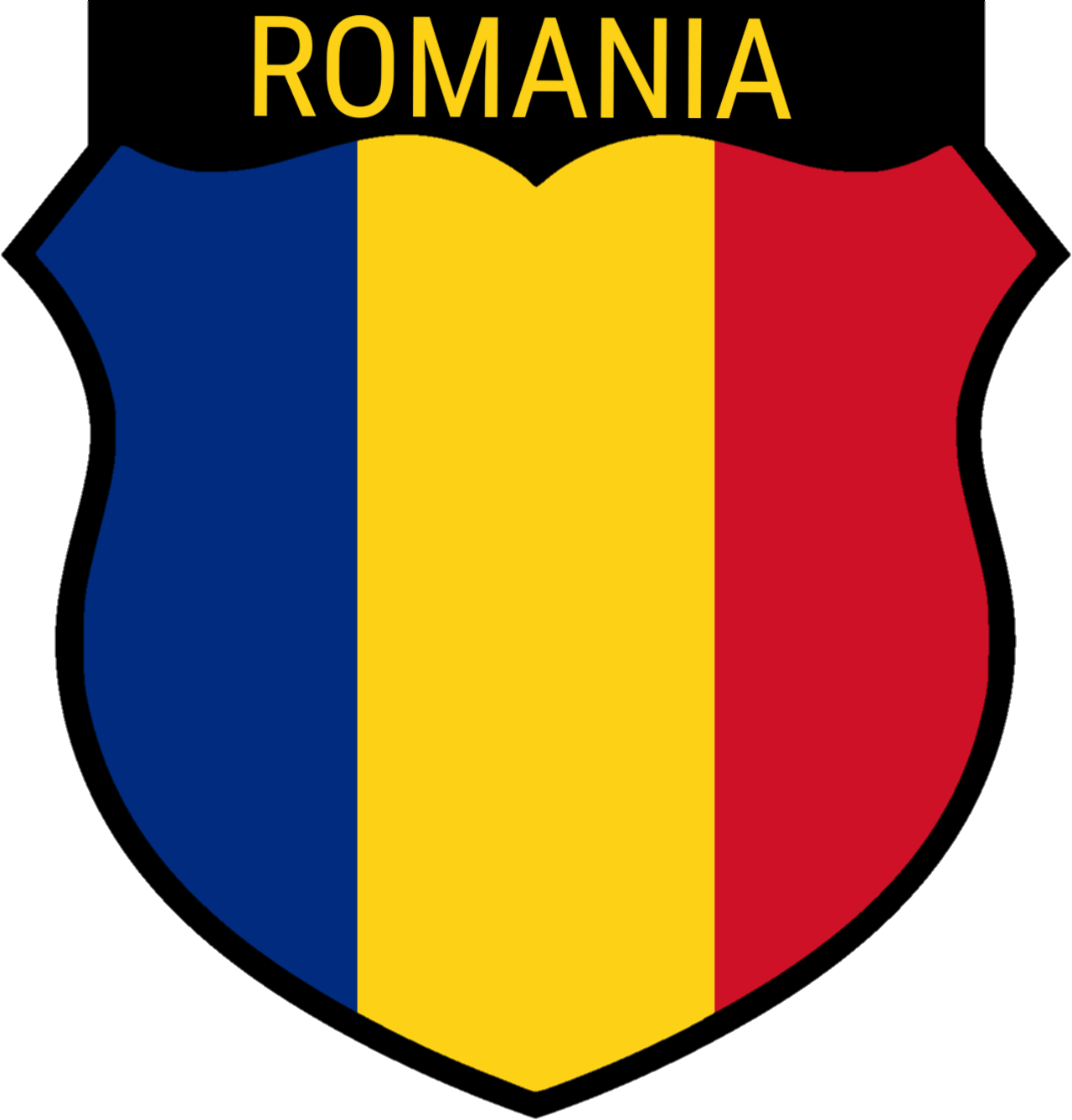
- Sleeve shield

During World War II, the Waffen Grenadier Regiment of the SS (1st Romanian) (German: Waffen-Grenadier Regiment der SS (Rumänisches Nr. 1)) was formed out of members of the Romanian 4th Infantry Division which had been captured in Hungary by the Germans after Romania signed a ceasefire with the Soviet Union.

The regiment also included members of the Fascist Iron Guard, which always had a close relationship with the SS. It was attached to the III (Germanic) SS Panzer Corps and fought on the River Oder front until the beginning of March 1945. It was then transferred to the eastern approaches to Berlin where it was destroyed during the Soviet Berlin offensive which was launched on 16 April 1945. Most of the unit survived and escaped westward into captivity.

== Construction battalion ==
It was hoped by the Germans that this unit would form the basis of a Waffen Grenadier Division of the SS (1st Romanian) and to that end a second regiment was formed. The Waffen Grenadier Regiment of the SS (2nd Romanian) began forming at Döllersheim in Austria. However, by this stage in the war there was no fuel for vehicles, little food, and no weapons or ammunition for the new regiment. In April 1945, the two battalions which had been formed were used as construction battalions.

== Commanders ==
- No. 1: SS-Sturmbannführer Gustav Wegner (or Wehner)
- No. 2: SS-Standartenführer Albert (or Alfred) Ludwig, later colonel Pilfonsch

== Order of battle ==
- 1st Battalion
- 2nd Battalion

== See also ==
- List of German divisions in World War II
- List of SS personnel
- List of Waffen-SS divisions
