= SS Brigade Westfalen =

SS Panzer Brigade Westfalen
- Active: 29 March - April 1945
- Country: Nazi Germany
- Branch: Waffen-SS
- Type: Panzer
- Role: Armoured warfare
- Size: Brigade
- Engagements: Ruhr Pocket

The SS Brigade Westfalen also known as SS Ersatz Brigade Westfalen was an ad hoc unit composed of the men of the military training commands of the Paderborn area and the 507th Heavy Panzer Battalion. The unit was committed into battle in March 1945 in an unsuccessful attempt to stop American troops from encircling Army Group B in the Ruhr Pocket.

== History ==
The brigade was formed on 29 March 1945 from training staff and other personnel at Sennelager Training Grounds north of Paderborn. The unit consisted of two improvised infantry regiments that were named after their commanders. Regiment "Meyer" consisted of three battalions: SS Panzer Reconnaissance Training and Replacement Battalion 1, SS Panzer Reconnaissance Training and Replacement Battalion 2, and an SS Panzer Reconnaissance NCO Training Battalion. Regiment "Holzer" was named after its commander Obersturmbannführer Friedrich Holzer and consisted of the SS Panzer Training and Replacement Regiment in Augustdorf, which consists of three battalions. The 507th Heavy Panzer Battalion was the brigade's main armor component.

The brigade had about 60 Tiger and Panther tanks as of 30 March 1945 according to Charles B. MacDonald. However, according to Steven Zaloga, the brigade instead had 15 old training tanks such as Panzer III, 21 Tiger II and three Jagdpanthers available by the end of March.

The brigade was first engaged on 30 March against elements of US 3rd Armored Division, trying to defend the way to Paderborn, until forced to relinquish the town by 1 April, falling back with possibly as many as forty tanks and assault guns still fit for action. The remnants of the brigade then engaged the US 3rd Armored Division on the way to the Weser.
