= Theodor Busse =

German general of infantry in the Second World War

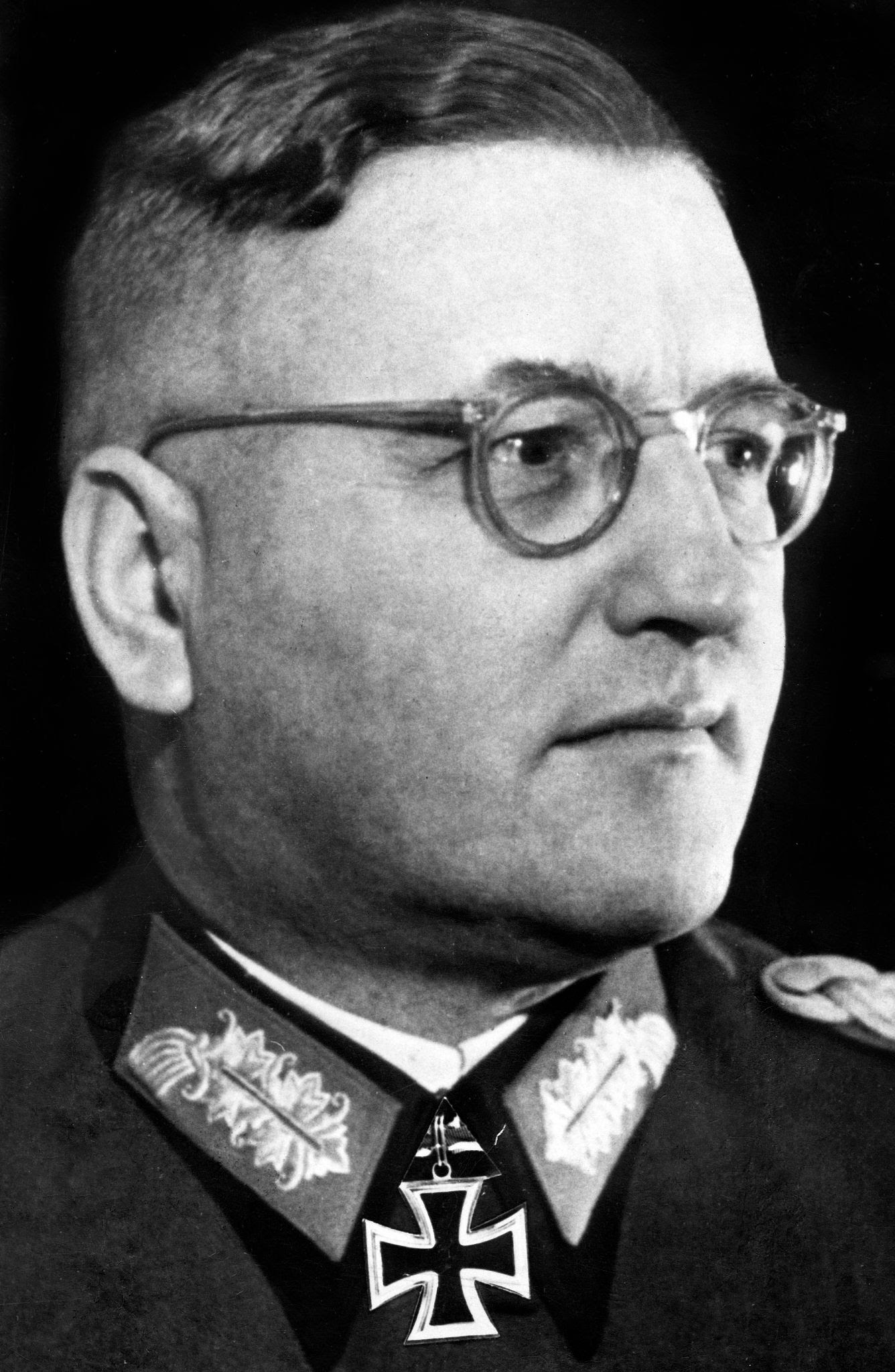
- Busse as General der Infanterie
- Born: 15 December 1897; Frankfurt an der Oder, Province of Brandenburg, Kingdom of Prussia, German Empire
- Died: 21 October 1986 (aged 88); Wallerstein, Bavaria, West Germany
- Military career
- Allegiance: German Empire; Weimar Republic; Nazi Germany
- Branch: Imperial German Army; Reichsheer; German Army
- Service years: 1915–1945
- Rank: General der Infanterie
- Units: I Army Corps; 9th Army
- Conflicts: World War I World War II
- Awards: Knight's Cross of the Iron Cross; Federal Cross of Merit

Ernst Hermann August Theodor Busse (15 December 1897 – 21 October 1986) was a German officer during World War I and World War II.

== Early life and career ==
Busse, a native of Frankfurt (Oder), joined the Imperial German Army as an officer cadet in 1915 and was commissioned in February 1917. He also was awarded the Knight's Cross with Swords of the Hohenzollern Order. After the armistice, he was accepted as one of 2,000 officers into the new Reichswehr in which he steadily rose in rank.

== World War II ==
Busse was a General Staff officer in April 1939 and prepared a training program that was approved by the Chief of the General Staff in August and covered a period from 1 October 1939 to 30 September 1940. Between 1940 and 1942, he served as the Chief of Operations to General (later Field Marshal) Erich von Manstein in the 11th Army on the Eastern Front. He remained serving on von Manstein's staff from 1942 to 1943 as Chief of Operations of Army Group Don and then from 1943 to 1944 he was Chief of Staff of Army Group South, both on the Eastern Front. Serving with Army Group South, he was awarded the Knight's Cross of the Iron Cross on 30 January 1944. He spent a short time in reserve and was then appointed General Officer Commanding German 121st Infantry Division. In July 1944, he commanded I Army Corps.

While Busse took command of the 9th Army on 21 January 1945, his appointment was never confirmed. It would appear that it was customary for commanders of formations of the status of an Army and higher to be on six months probation before their final appointments as Commanders-in-Chief. Germany surrendered unconditionally before Busse's probationary period had expired.

During the last five months of the war, Busse commanded the 9th Army, which had become part of Army Group Vistula. As the Soviets continued to advance into Germany, he fought to protect the German capital. Specifically, Busse commanded the 9th Army during the Battle of Seelow Heights and the Battle of the Oder-Neisse. In April 1945, during the Battle of Berlin, Busse's Ninth Army was cut off from the armies on its flanks and almost encircled by Soviet Forces. General Gotthard Heinrici tried to convince Busse to withdraw several times, but Busse refused even to consider withdrawal unless a specific command arrived from the Führer. Eventually Busse's Ninth Army was driven into a pocket in the Spree Forest south of the Seelow Heights and west of Frankfurt, where it became fully encircled by two prongs of the massive Soviet assault on Berlin. In the ever-shrinking pocket, Busse's forces were all but annihilated in what is known as the Battle of Halbe, but remnants ultimately managed to break through to the west to link up with General Walther Wenck’s 12th Army south of Beelitz and then to withdraw west to the Elbe, cross the partially-destroyed bridge at Tangermünde and surrender to American forces between May 4 and 7.

== Postwar ==
Between 1945 and 1947, Busse was a prisoner of war. After the war Busse was West Germany's director of civil defence, and he wrote and edited a number of works on the military history of World War II.

== Awards and decorations ==
- Iron Cross (1914), 2nd and 1st Class
  - 2nd Class on 3 November 1916
  - 1st Class on 22 August 1917
- House Order of Hohenzollern, Knight's Cross with Swords (HOH3X) on 29 July 1918
- Wound Badge (1918) in Black
- The Honour Cross of the World War 1914/1918 with Swords on 5 December 1934
- Wehrmacht Long Service Award, 4th to 2nd Class on 2 October 1936
- Order of St. Sava, 3rd Class (Commander) on 23 October 1939
- Repetition Clasp 1939 to the Iron Cross 1914, 2nd and 1st Class
  - 2nd Class on 27 May 1940
  - 1st Class on 30 May 1940
- Order of the Star of Romania, Commander with Swords on the ribbon of the Order of Military Virtue on 9 August 1941
- Order of Michael the Brave, 3rd Class on 8 May 1942
- Winter Battle in the East 1941–42 Medal on 10 August 1942
- Crimea Shield on 10 September 1942
- German Cross in Gold on 24 May 1942 as Oberst im Generalstab in AOK 11
- Knight's Cross of the Iron Cross on 30 January 1944 as Generalleutnant and Chief of the Generalstab of Army Group South
- Order of Merit of the Federal Republic of Germany, Knight Commander's Cross of the Order of Merit (Großes Verdienstkreuz mit Stern, Great Cross of Merit with Star) on 25 January 1966

== Books edited ==
- Kursk: The German View by Steven H. Newton. The first part of the book goes to a new translation of a study of Operation Citadel (the great tank battle of Kursk) edited by General Theodor Busse, which offers the perspectives of key tank, infantry, and air commanders.

== Sources ==
- German Federal Archives: BArch PERS 6/104 and PERS 6/299501

Military offices
Preceded by General der Infanterie Helmuth Prieß	Commander of 121. Infanterie-Division; 10 July 1944 – 1 August 1944	Succeeded by Generalleutnant Werner Ranck
Preceded by Generaloberst Carl Hilpert	Commander of I. Armeekorps; 1 August 1944 – 9 January 1945	Succeeded by General der Infanterie Friedrich Fangohr
Preceded by General Smilo Freiherr von Lüttwitz	Commander of 9. Armee; 20 January 1945 – 2 May 1945	Succeeded by none
