= Panzer Division Holstein =

- Active: 10 February 1945 – 26 March 1945
- Disbanded: 8 May 1945
- Country: Nazi Germany
- Branch: Army
- Type: Panzer
- Role: Armoured warfare
- Size: Division

Panzer-Division Holstein was an armoured division of the German army during World War 2. It was in formed on 10 February 1945 through the acquisition of the mobile parts of the 233 Reserve Panzer Division. It suffered heavy losses in the area southwest of Kolberg, and the remnants were absorbed by the 18th Panzergrenadier Division on 26 March 1945.

== Known commanders ==
- Generalleutnant Max Fremerey (1 Feb 1945 – 16 Feb 1945)
- Oberst Joachim Hesse (10 Feb 1945 – 26 Mar 1945)

== Area of operation ==
Berlin, Germany, and Denmark

== Organisation of the division ==
- Pz.Abt.44
- Pz.Gren.Rgt. 139
- Pz.Gren.Rgt. 142
- Pz.Aufkl.Abt. 44
- Pz.Jg.Abt. 144
- Pz.Art.Abt. 144
- Pz.Pi.Btl. 144
- Pz.Nachr.Kp. 144
- Kdr.Pz.Nachschubtruppen 144
