= Felix Steiner =

Waffen-SS commander (1896–1966)

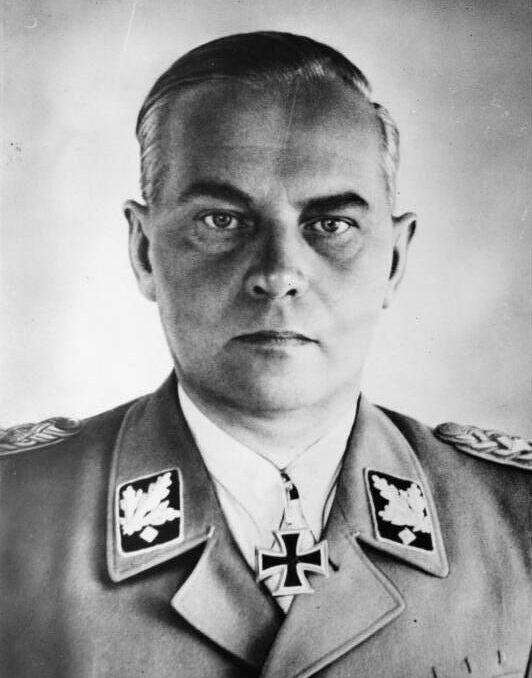
- Steiner in 1942
- Born: Felix Martin Julius Steiner; 23 May 1896; Stallupönen, East Prussia, Kingdom of Prussia, German Empire (now Nesterov, Russia)
- Died: 12 May 1966 (aged 69); Munich, Bavaria, West Germany
- Military career
- Allegiance: Germany
- Branch: Imperial German Army; Prussian Army; Reichswehr
- Service years: 1914–1918; 1921–1933
- Rank: Major
- Unit: 41st Infantry Regiment
- Conflicts: World War I
- Other work: Founding member of HIAG, Waffen-SS lobby group
- Freikorps and SS career
- Allegiance: Weimar Republic; Nazi Germany
- Branch: Freikorps; Sturmabteilung; Schutzstaffel; Waffen-SS
- Service years: 1919–1920; 1933–1945
- Rank: SS-Obergruppenführer and General of the Waffen-SS
- Service number: NSDAP #4,264,295; SS #253,351
- Commands: SS Division Das Reich; SS Division Wiking; III SS Panzer Corps; Army Detachment Steiner
- Conflicts: World War II; Invasion of Poland; Battle of France; Battle of Narva; Battle of Tannenberg Line; Battle of Berlin
- Awards: Knight's Cross of the Iron Cross with Oak Leaves and Swords

Felix Martin Julius Steiner (23 May 1896 – 12 May 1966) was a German SS commander during the Nazi era. During World War II, he served in the Waffen-SS, the combat branch of the SS, and commanded several SS divisions and corps. He was awarded the Knight's Cross of the Iron Cross with Oak Leaves and Swords. Together with Paul Hausser, he contributed significantly to the development and transformation of the Waffen-SS into a combat force made up of volunteers and conscripts from both occupied and un-occupied lands.

Steiner was chosen by Heinrich Himmler to oversee the creation of and then command the SS Division Wiking. In 1943, he was promoted to the command of the III SS Panzer Corps. On 28 January 1945, Steiner was placed in command of the 11th SS Panzer Army, which formed part of a new Army Group Vistula, an ad-hoc formation to defend Berlin from the Soviet armies advancing from the Vistula River.

On 21 April 1945, during the Battle for Berlin, Steiner was placed in command of Army Detachment Steiner, with which Adolf Hitler ordered Steiner to envelop the 1st Belorussian Front through a pincer movement, advancing from the north of the city. However, as his unit was outnumbered ten to one, Steiner made it clear that he did not have the capacity for a counter-attack on 22 April during the daily situation conference in the Führerbunker.

After the capitulation of Germany, Steiner was imprisoned and investigated for war crimes. He faced charges at the Nuremberg Trials, but they were dropped and he was released in 1948. In 1953, Steiner was recruited by the U.S. Central Intelligence Agency (CIA) to found the Gesellschaft für Wehrkunde ("Society for Defense Studies"), composed of former German military officers, as a propaganda tool and a military think tank for the rearmament of West Germany.

Along with other former high-ranking Waffen-SS personnel, Steiner was a founding member of HIAG, a lobby group of Revisionist apologists formed in 1951 to campaign for the legal, economic and historical rehabilitation of the Waffen-SS. He had two daughters and one son.

== Life ==
=== Early life and World War I ===
Steiner was born on 23 May 1896 in Stallupönen in Prussia, (in East Prussia) German Empire. He joined the Royal Prussian Army as an infantry cadet. During World War I, he was awarded the Iron Cross 1st and 2nd class. In 1919, Steiner joined the paramilitary Freikorps in the East Prussian city of Memel during the German Revolution and was later incorporated into the Reichswehr in 1921. In 1933, he left the army having attained the rank of major.

=== SS career ===
Steiner first joined the Nazi Party (NSDAP) (membership number: 4,264,295) and the Sturmabteilung (SA). In 1935 he enlisted in the SS. He took command of a battalion of SS-Verfügungstruppen (SS-VT) troops, and within a year had been promoted to SS-Standartenführer; and later was put in command of the SS-Deutschland Regiment.

At the outbreak of World War II, he was SS-Oberführer (senior leader) in charge of the Waffen-SS regiment SS-Deutschland. He led this regiment through the Invasion of Poland and the Battle of France, for which he was awarded the Knight's Cross of the Iron Cross on 15 August 1940. Steiner was introduced to Heinrich Himmler, the head of the SS, to oversee the creation of, and then command the new SS Division Wiking. This division was militarily successful but also very barbaric in the invasion of the Soviet Union, for example killing 600 Jews in Zboriv, Ukraine. At the time of its creation, the division consisted mostly of German volunteers, with only around 1,141 non-German volunteers (roughly 6%) when it entered Operation Barbarossa.

In April 1943, he was placed in command of a newly formed III SS Panzer Corps. The unit participated in anti-partisan actions in Yugoslavia. In November/December 1943 his corps was transferred to the Eastern Front and positioned in the northern sector at Leningrad under Army Group North. Steiner's Panzer Corps played a leading role during the Battle of Narva and the Battle of Tannenberg Line. His unit then withdrew with the rest of Army Group North to the Courland Peninsula.

=== Battle of Berlin ===
In January 1945, Steiner along with the III SS Panzer Corps was transferred by ship from the Courland Pocket to help with the defence of the German homeland. The corps was assigned to Army Group Vistula under the new Eleventh SS Panzer Army although the army really existed only on paper. Once the Soviet Army had reached the Oder River, the Eleventh SS Panzer Army became inactive, and the III SS Panzer Corps was reassigned to the German Third Panzer Army as a reserve during the Soviets' Berlin Offensive Operation. During the Battle of Seelow Heights, the first major battle of the offensive, General Gotthard Heinrici, the commander of Army Group Vistula, transferred most of the III SS Panzer Corps' divisions to General Theodor Busse's Ninth Army.

By 21 April, Soviet Marshal Georgy Zhukov's 1st Belorussian Front had broken through the German lines on the Seelow Heights. Hitler, ignoring the facts, started to call the ragtag units that came under Steiner's command, the Army Detachment Steiner.

Hitler ordered Steiner to attack the northern flank of the huge salient that had been created by the 1st Belorussian Front's breakout. Steiner's attack was supposed to coincide with General Theodor Busse's Ninth Army attacking from the south in a pincer attack. The Ninth Army had been pushed to south of the 1st Belorussian Front's salient. To facilitate the attack, Steiner was assigned the three divisions of the Ninth Army's CI Army Corps: the 4th SS Panzergrenadier Division Polizei, the 5th Jäger Division and the 25th Panzergrenadier Division. All three divisions were north of the Finow Canal on the Northern flank of Zhukov's salient. General Helmuth Weidling's LVI Panzer Corps, which was still east of Berlin with its northern flank just below Werneuchen, was also ordered to participate in the attack. The three divisions from CI Army Corps planned to attack south from Eberswalde on the Finow Canal towards the LVI Panzer Corps. The three divisions from CI Army Corps were 24 kilometres (about 15 miles) east of Berlin, and the attack to the south would cut the 1st Belorussian Front's salient into two. Steiner called Heinrici and informed him that the plan could not be implemented because the 5th Jäger Division and the 25th Panzergrenadier Division were deployed defensively and could not be redeployed until the 2nd Naval Division arrived from the coast to relieve them. That left only two battalions of the 4th SS Panzergrenadier Division available, and they had no combat weapons.

Based on Steiner's assessment, Heinrici called General Hans Krebs, Chief of Staff of the German General Staff of the Army High Command (Oberkommando des Heeres or OKH), and told him that the plan could not be implemented. Heinrici asked to speak to Hitler but was told Hitler was too busy to take his call. On 22 April 1945, at his afternoon conference, Hitler, becoming aware that Steiner was not going to attack, fell into a tearful rage. Hitler finally declared that the war was lost, blamed the generals for the Reich's defeat and announced that he would remain in Berlin until the end and then kill himself. On the same day, General Rudolf Holste was given the few mobile forces that Steiner commanded so that he could participate in a new plan to relieve Berlin. Holste was to attack from the north while General Walther Wenck attacked from the west and General Theodor Busse attacked from the south. The attacks amounted to little, and on 25 April, the Soviet forces attacking to the north and the south of Berlin linked up to the west of the city.

=== Post-war ===
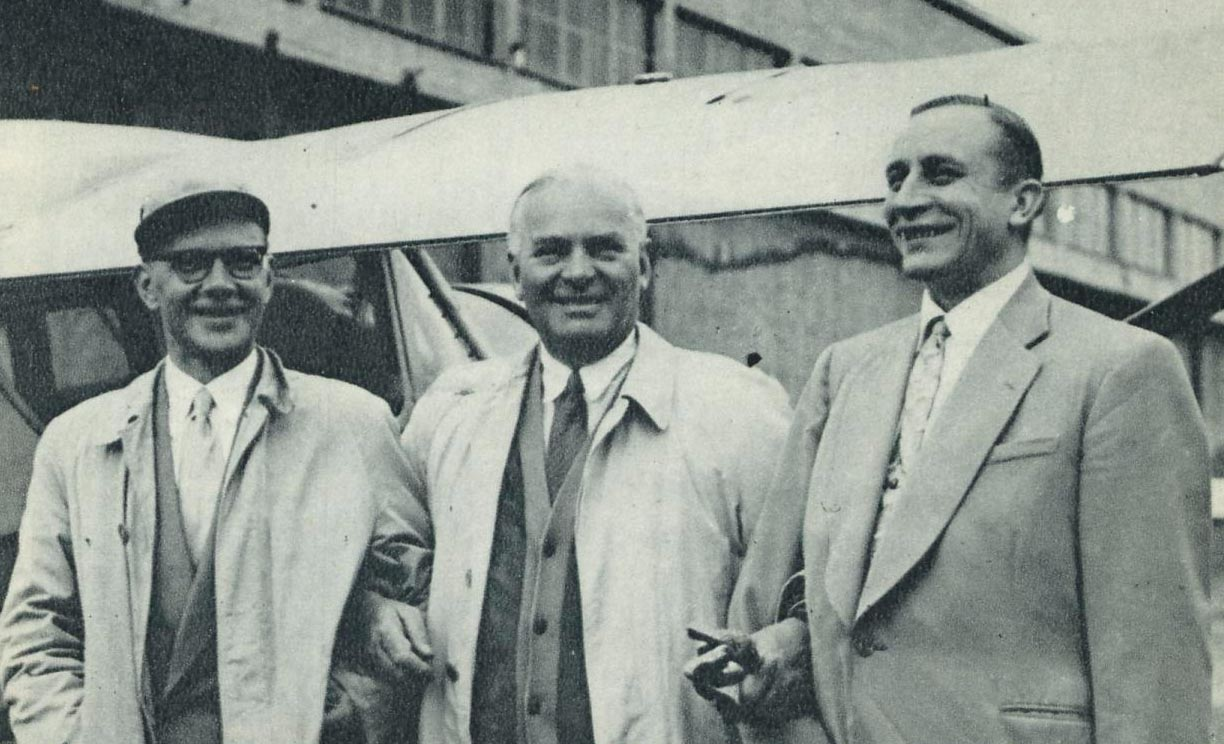
Post-war photo of Steiner in Finland with SS veterans Unto Parvilahti (l) and Aarne Roiha (r).

After the surrender, Steiner was incarcerated until 1948. He faced charges at the Nuremberg Trials, but they were dropped and he was released.

In 1953, Steiner was recruited by the U.S. Central Intelligence Agency to found the Gesellschaft für Wehrkunde ("Society for Defense Studies"), composed of former German military officers, as a propaganda tool and a military think tank for West German rearmament. With Paul Hausser, Herbert Gille, and Otto Kumm, Steiner became a founding member of HIAG, the lobby group founded by former high-ranking Waffen-SS officers in West Germany in 1951.

Despite being an ardent German nationalist and veteran, he was not fanatical like Hermann-Bernhard Ramcke. In fact, when Ramcke began making truly odious comments to HIAG rallies, Steiner distanced himself from Ramcke.

From his home in West Germany he published Die Freiwilligen der Waffen-SS: Idee und Opfergang ("The Volunteers of Waffen-SS: Idea and Sacrifice") in 1958. Steiner's books and memoirs have been characterised by historian Charles Sydnor as one of the "most important works of apologist literature", together with warfare analyses Grenadiere by Kurt Meyer and Waffen-SS im Einsatz by Paul Hausser. These works demanded rehabilitation of the military branch of the NSDAP, with Steiner's works being important in stressing the theme of the purely military Waffen-SS.

A second book was published in 1963 under the title Die Armee der Geächteten (English: "The Army of the Outlaws") and was also described by Sydnor as tendentious.

Steiner died on 12 May 1966, 11 days before his 70th birthday.

== Summary of SS career ==
=== Promotions ===
- 1934 as Sturmbannführer 1935 as Obersturmbannführer
- 1 June 1936 Entrance into the SS-Verfügungstruppe as SS-Standartenführer
- 1939 Started World War II as SS-Oberführer
- 9 November 1940 promoted SS-Brigadeführer und Generalmajor der Waffen-SS
- 1 January 1942 promoted SS-Gruppenführer und Generalleutnant der Waffen-SS
- 1 July 1943 promoted SS-Obergruppenführer und General der Waffen-SS

=== Awards ===
- Iron Cross (1914) 2nd Class (9 October 1914) & 1st Class (3 November 1917)
- Wound Badge (1918) in Black
- Clasp to the Iron Cross (1939) 2nd Class (17 September 1939) & 1st Class (26 September 1939)
- German Cross in Gold on 22 April 1942 as SS-Gruppenführer and Generalmajor of the Waffen-SS with the 5. SS-Panzergrenadier-Division "Wiking"
- Knight's Cross of the Iron Cross with Oak Leaves and Swords
  - Knight's Cross on 15 August 1940 as SS-Oberführer and commander of SS-Standarte "Deutschland".
  - 159th Oak Leaves on 23 December 1942 as SS-Gruppenführer and Generalleutnant of the Waffen-SS and commander of 5. SS-Panzergrenadier-Division "Wiking"
  - 86th Swords on 10 August 1944 as SS-Obergruppenführer and general of the Waffen-SS and commanding general of III. germanischen SS-Panzerkorps
- Order of the Cross of Liberty, 1st class with Breast Star, Oak Leaves and Swords (Finland) [10]

=== Commands ===
- Commander of the SS-Regiment "Deutschland" 1 June 1936 to 1 December 1940
- 1 December 1940 to 31 January 1940 Commander of SS-Germania Division (mot),
- On 31 December 1940 SS-Germania Division renamed SS-Wiking Division
- On 9 November 1942 SS-Wiking redesignated 5.SS-Wiking Panzergrenadier Division (I),
- 10 May 1943 to November 9, 1944, Commander of the III (Germanic) SS Panzer Corps
- 26 November 1944 to March 5, 1945, Commander of the XI SS Panzer Army
- Command of the III (Germanic) SS Panzer Corps a corps in the Third Panzer Army
- On 21 April 1945 what remained of Steiner's command redesignated Army Detachment Steiner

== See also ==
- Operation Solstice
- Waffen-SS in popular culture
- Downfall (2004 film)
- List of Nazi Party leaders and officials
- Glossary of Nazi Germany

Military offices
Preceded by none	Commander of SS-Standarte "Deutschland"; June 1936 – 1 December 1940	Succeeded by none
Preceded by none	Commander of 5. SS-Panzer-Division Wiking; 1 December 1940 – 1 May 1943	Succeeded by SS-Obergruppenführer Herbert Otto Gille
Preceded by none	Commander of III.(germanische) SS-Panzerkorps; 1 May 1943 – October 1944	Succeeded by SS-Obergruppenführer Georg Keppler
Preceded by none	Commander of 11.SS-Panzerarmee; 28 January 1945 – 5 March 1945	Succeeded by General der Infanterie Otto Hitzfeld
Preceded by Generalleutnant Martin Unrein	Commander of III.(germanische) SS-Panzerkorps; 5 March 1945 – 8 May 1945	Succeeded by none
Preceded by none	Commander of Army Detachment Steiner; 21 April 1945 – 8 May 1945	Succeeded by none
