= Army Group Vistula =

German army group that attempted to defend Berlin during WW2

- German: Heeresgruppe Weichsel
- Active: 24 January – 8 May 1945
- Country: Nazi Germany
- Branch: German Army
- Type: Army
- Size: 104,162 combat troops (1 April 1945)
- Engagements: Eastern Front: Operation Solstice; Battle of Berlin

Commanders
- Notable commanders: Heinrich Himmler; Gotthard Heinrici

Army Group Vistula (German: Heeresgruppe Weichsel) was an Army Group of the Wehrmacht, formed on 24 January 1945. It lasted for 105 days, having been put together from elements of Army Group A (shattered in the Soviet Vistula-Oder Offensive), Army Group Centre (similarly largely destroyed in the East Prussian Offensive), and a variety of new or ad hoc formations. It was formed to protect Berlin from the Soviet armies advancing from the Vistula River.

== Establishment and history ==
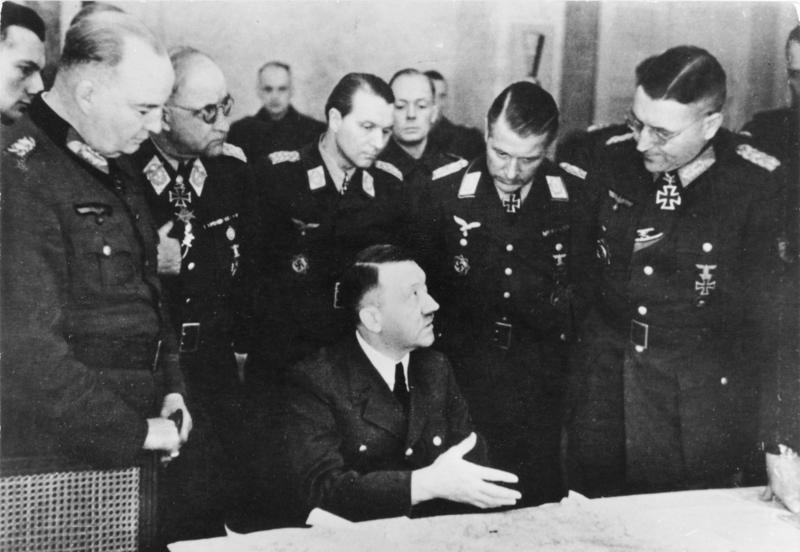
Briefing at the headquarters of Army Group Vistula

Heinz Guderian had originally urged the creation of a new army group as an essentially defensive measure to fill the gap opening in German defences between the lower Vistula and the lower Oder.

The new Army Group Vistula was duly formed from an assortment of rebuilt, new and existing units. Guderian intended to propose Field-Marshal Maximilian von Weichs as commander. However, in a reflection of Hitler's desire to transfer control of the conflict from the Wehrmacht to the SS, Heinrich Himmler was appointed. Himmler, who lacked any real military knowledge, (Note: Although this was not Himmler's first such operational military high command appointment. Between 10 December 1944 and 24 January 1945 (the day before he took up this command) he commanded Army Group Oberrhein.) proved inadequate to the task; General Gotthard Heinrici replaced Himmler as commander of Army Group Vistula on 20 March, subsequent to its participation in the German offensive codenamed Operation Solstice and the following defence against the Soviet East Pomeranian Offensive.

Between January and February 1945, Army Group Vistula sustained 98,000 casualties, including 15,000 dead, 50,000 wounded (not counting non-evacuees), and 33,000 missing. On 1 April 1945, it had 185,975 assigned personnel (split between the 9th Army and the 3rd Panzer Army), with 104,162 soldiers in active combat, 21,946 sick and wounded since 1 February, and 318 vacationers.

The Army Group's only offensive action was Operation Solstice, the failed attempt to relieve the fortress of Kustrin late in March 1945, during which the subordinate XXXIX Panzer Corps took heavy casualties.

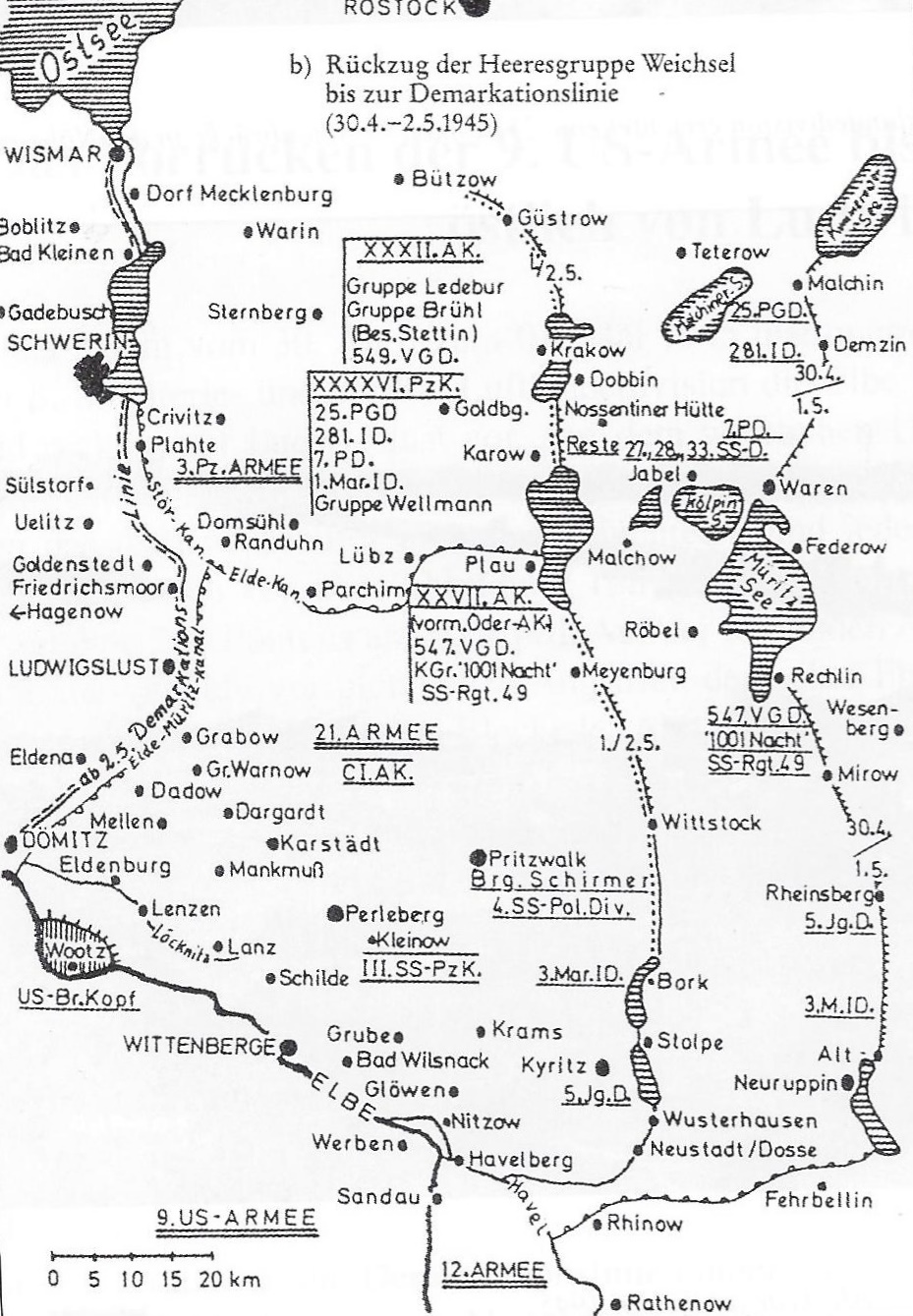
The retreat of Army Group Vistula, 1945

Under the command of Gotthard Heinrici, parts of the army group fought through the Battle of Berlin and Battle of Halbe, with some of its elements not surrendering until the end of the war in Europe on 8 May 1945. Army Group Vistula's strength was in the region of 500,000 troops; (Note: who states that German sources give the group's size as 32-34 divisions, while a "good Soviet source" identifies it as having 450,000 troops. Duffy 1991, p. 177) in general, the army group was poorly equipped, many of its units being little more than the 'paper' formations typical of the German military at the end of World War II. Indeed, when first set up it was found that the army group lacked many essential facilities, such as proper maps or a headquarters signals detachment—the sole means of communication being Himmler's private telephone.

== Organisation ==
The Army Group was originally formed from:

- The 9th Army of General der Infanterie Theodor Busse, which had previously been part of Army Group A and had been shattered around Warsaw during the Vistula-Oder Offensive. This now held lines on the Oder and was progressively rebuilt.
- The 2nd Army of Generaloberst Walter Weiß, which as part of Army Group Centre had been defending the line of the Narew river on the borders of East Prussia. The East Prussian Offensive had cut it off from the remnants of its parent formation, and by late January it defended a long sector from Elbing in the east running westwards through Pomerania. It therefore formed the new army group's northern and eastern flank.
- The 11th SS Panzer Army was a 'new' formation which had been assembled in western Pomerania. Soon after its formation it received the commander Obergruppenführer Felix Steiner and other staff of the 3rd Panzer Army, which had been largely destroyed in East Prussia.

During the East Pomeranian Offensive, the Second Army was finally cut off from the remainder of the army group and withdrew into Danzig, where it was eventually destroyed. The rest of Army Group Vistula was forced west of the Oder, though the Third Panzer Army retained a small bridgehead at Altdamm until the middle of March.

Towards the end of April, the Twenty-First Army (itself formed around the remnants of the Fourth Army, which had been destroyed in the Heiligenbeil Cauldron), commanded by General der Infanterie Kurt von Tippelskirch, was added to Army Group Vistula.

== Order of Battle during Soviet Berlin Offensive ==
- German 3rd Panzer Army (General der Panzertruppe Hasso von Manteuffel from 9 March 1945 to 8 May 1945)
  - III (Germanic) SS Panzer Corps (Obergruppenführer Felix Steiner) (later transferred to Twenty-First Army, below)
  - CI Corps (later transferred to Twenty-First Army, see below)
  - XXVII Corps (later transferred to Twenty-First Army, see below)
  - XXXII Corps
  - XXXXVI Panzer Corps
  - Verteidigungsbereich Swinemünde
- German 21st Army (General der Infanterie Kurt von Tippelskirch)
  - III (Germanic) SS Panzer Corps
  - CI Corps
  - XXVII Corps
- German 9th Army (General der Infanterie Theodor Busse from 20 January 1945 to 2 May 1945)
  - CI Corps (to mid-April)
  - LVI Panzer Corps (General der Artillerie Helmuth Weidling from 12 April 1945 to 23 April 1945)
  - XI SS Panzer Corps
  - V SS Mountain Corps

== Commanders ==
No.	Portrait	Commander	Took office	Left office	Time in office
1	Heinrich Himmler	Reichsführer-SS; Heinrich Himmler (1900–1945)	24 January 1945	20 March 1945	55 days
2	Gotthard Heinrici	Generaloberst; Gotthard Heinrici (1886–1971)	20 March 1945	28 April 1945	39 days
–	Kurt von Tippelskirch	General der Infanterie; Kurt von Tippelskirch (1891–1957); Acting	28 April 1945	29 April 1945	1 day
3	Kurt Student	Generaloberst; Kurt Student (1890–1978)	29 April 1945	8 May 1945	9 days

== See also ==
- Battle for Berlin
