= III (Germanic) SS Panzer Corps =

III SS Panzer Corps
- Active: April 1943 – 4 May 1945
- Country: Germany
- Branch: Waffen-SS
- Type: Panzer corps
- Role: Armoured warfare
- Size: Corps
- Engagements: World War II

The III (Germanic) SS Panzer Corps (III. (germanisches) SS-Panzerkorps) was a Waffen-SS armoured corps which saw action on the Eastern Front during World War II. The (Germanische) (lit. Germanic) part of its designation was granted as it was composed primarily of foreign volunteer formations.

== History ==
The corps was formed in April 1943 as a headquarters for the 5th SS Panzergrenadier Division "Wiking" and the 11th SS Panzergrenadier Division "Nordland". The corps was placed under the control of former Wiking commander SS-Obergruppenführer Felix Steiner. After training, the corps took part in operations against the Yugoslav Partisans. The corps was then sent to a quiet sector in Army Group North, now made up of the Nordland Division and the 4th SS Volunteer Panzergrenadier Brigade "Nederland". By this stage, Wiking had been sent south and came under the control of Army Group South's 8th Army.

Forced back by the 1944 Soviet winter offensive, the corps participated in the Battle for Narva Bridgehead in the summer of 1944. It then retreated with the rest of the army group across Estonia and into the Courland Peninsula. Transferred to the Oder Front and placed under Steiner's 11th SS Panzer Army, the corps participated in Operation Solstice before being assigned as the reserve corps to the 3rd Panzer Army.

== Commanders ==
- SS-Obergruppenführer Felix Steiner (1 May 1943 – 30 October 1944)
- SS-Obergruppenführer Georg Keppler (30 October 1944 – 4 February 1945)
- SS-Obergruppenführer Matthias Kleinheisterkamp (4 February 1945 – 11 February 1945)
- Generalleutnant Martin Unrein (11 February 1945 – 5 March 1945)
- SS-Obergruppenführer Felix Steiner (5 March 1945 – 8 May 1945)

== Orders of battle ==
15 June 1944 — Narva Front

- 103rd SS Heavy Panzer Battalion
- 11th SS Volunteer Panzergrenadier Division "Nordland"
- 20th Waffen Grenadier Division of the SS (1st Estonian)
- 4th SS Volunteer Panzergrenadier Brigade "Nederland"

16 September 1944

- 103rd SS Heavy Panzer Battalion
- 11th SS Volunteer Panzergrenadier Division "Nordland"
- 20th Waffen Grenadier Division of the SS (1st Estonian)
- 4th SS Volunteer Panzergrenadier Brigade "Nederland"
- 5th SS Volunteer Assault Brigade "Wallonien"
- 6th SS Volunteer Assault Brigade "Langemarck"
- 11th Infantry Division
- 300th Special Infantry Division
- Waffen Grenadier Regiment of the SS (1st Romanian)
