= J.J. Fedorowicz Publishing =

Canadian publishers

- Status: Active
- Founded: 1983; 42 years ago
- Founder: John Fedorowicz
- Country of origin: Canada
- Headquarters location: Winnipeg, Manitoba
- Distribution: Worldwide
- Publication types: Books
- Nonfiction topics: Military unit histories, military vehicles
- Official website: www.jjfpub.mb.ca//

J.J. Fedorowicz Publishing is a Canadian publishing house that specialises in literature on the German armed forces of the World War II era. Its authors are both popular history writers such as Paul Carell and Franz Kurowski, along with the war-time veterans (and post-war apologists), including Kurt Meyer of the SS Division Hitlerjugend and Otto Weidinger of the SS Division Das Reich.

The press has received praise from North American and German writers for professionally produced text and picture books. J.J. Fedorowicz has been profiled by the American historians Ronald Smelser and Edward J. Davies in their 2006 work The Myth of the Eastern Front: The Nazi–Soviet War in American Popular Culture', where they describe Fedorowicz as a leading press of war-romancing literature and criticise it for providing a platform for authors who present an uncritical and ahistorical portrayal of the German war effort during the Soviet-German war of 1941–1945.

== Authors ==
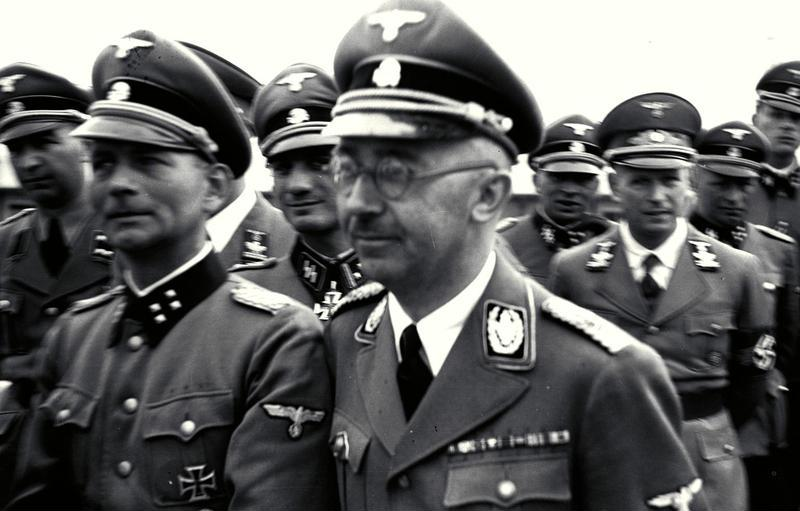
SS commander and subsequent Fedorowicz author Otto Kumm (front row, left) on tour of the Mauthausen concentration camp with Heinrich Himmler (center), June 1941.

J.J.Fedorowicz Publishing was the first North American press to translate works by the German author Franz Kurowski, providing laudatory and fictionalised wartime chronicles of German units and their highly decorated personnel. In early 1990s, Fedorowicz released Kurowski's two popular works, Panzer Aces and Infantry Aces, in 1992 and 1994, respectively. The first two books were followed up by Panzer Aces II, Panzer Aces III, Luftwaffe Aces and similar works.

In addition to Kurowski, the publishing house printed works by authors such as Patrick Agte (closely associated with the post-war Waffen-SS lobby group HIAG), former Nazi propagandist Paul Carell and Marc Rikmenspoel, a leading apologist for the Waffen-SS. It brought to the English-speaking audiences multiple works by former Waffen-SS members, such as Hubert Meyer, Rudolf Lehmann, Kurt "Panzer" Meyer, Otto Weidinger, and Karl Ullrich, among others. Their publications included memoirs by former Wehrmacht Heer (army) personnel, such as Otto Carius, a famous "panzer ace", and Helmuth Spaeter of the Division Grossdeutschland. Many of the Fedorowicz titles were subsequently made available to a wider audience by mass market and specialty publishers such as Ballantine Books and Stackpole Books.

== Reception ==
Historians Ronald Smelser and Edward J. Davies in their work The Myth of the Eastern Front: The Nazi–Soviet War in American Popular Culture describe J.J. Fedorowicz as the leading publisher of war-romancing literature dedicated to the portrayal of the German war effort on the Eastern Front. The books include multiple photographs and are accompanied by cover art that, as with Kurowski's Panzer Aces series, "evokes heroism, determination and might of the German soldier and his weapons".

According to The Myth of the Eastern Front: The Nazi–Soviet War in American Popular Culture, J.J.Fedorowicz has played an important role in publicising the works of German World War II veterans, such as Otto Carius, alongside the authors who the book describes as "gurus". In Smelser and Davies's definition, the gurus are writers who specialise in the Wehrmacht and, in particular, the Waffen-SS and are popular among the readers who "romanticise" the Eastern Front. These authors present an uncritical and ahistorical portrayal of the military and paramilitary formations of Nazi Germany that is in stark contrast to the realities of the war of conquest and racial annihilation. The book describes Fedorowicz's web site as "the heart of the romancing ethos", among other similar publishers such as Schiffer Publishing and Merriam Press:

In some cases, as their [gurus'] appeal grows, they graduate up the scale of publishing importance from self-publishing to the myriad small presses (...), to the top, particularly to the Fedorowicz publishing house (...). To be published through Fedorowicz is to have arrived.

In contrast, the press has won praise from its authors for its portrayal of the German military. In a preface to the Fedorowicz translation of his Tigers in the Mud, Carius thanks the publisher for enabling him and other German authors to reach a broader audience in the English-speaking world. He writes:

Through these publications, the defamation of the German soldier in film, television and the press has been countered and the picture of the Wehrmacht has been a more objective one by means of the help offered by many sources.

Smelser and Davies conclude that Fedorowicz's position on the former members of the Wehrmacht and the Waffen-SS hues closely to that of Carius, who condemns the deserters and traitors, along with "lies" and false "claims" about the German soldier. "The Fedorowicz link provides romancers with reaffirmation of their sentiments toward the German soldiers and their field commanders", the book finds.

Chris Evans, history editor at Stackpole Books, writes in an introduction to one of the Fedorowicz books reissued by Stackpole: "J.J. Fedorowicz has a well earned reputation for publishing exceptionally high quality books on German World War II subjects". Author Mark Healy in his work Zitadelle: The German Offensive Against the Kursk Salient 4–17 July 1943 refers to Fedorowicz's publications on the Battle of Kursk as "remarkable text and photo books", highlighting the two volume works by Restayn and Moller, which contain new photographs and present an "unforgettable image of the scale of the battle". Favorably comparing Fedorowicz with Schiffer Publishing, author George Forty notes that the company has a "worldwide reputation for the excellences in its military literature".

== Select publications ==
Sample publications include:

- J.J. How (2004): Hill 112: Cornerstone of the Normandy Campaign
- Patrick Agte (2005): Michael Wittmann and the Tiger Commanders of the Leibstandarte
- Paul Carell (1990): Hitler moves East, 1941–1943
- Willi Fey (1990): Armor battles of the Waffen-SS, 1943-45
- Otto Kumm (1995): Prinz Eugen: The History of the 7. SS-Mountain Division "Prinz Eugen"
- Franz Kurowski (1992): Panzer Aces
- Rudolf Lehmann (1987): The Leibstandarte
- Hubert Meyer (1994): History of the 12th SS Panzer Division Hitlerjugend
- Kurt Meyer (2001): Grenadiers
- Marc Rikmenspoel (1999): Soldiers of the Waffen-SS: Many Nations, One Motto
- Peter Strassner (1988): European Volunteers: the 5. SS-Panzer-Division "Wiking"
- Wilhelm Tieke (2001): Tragedy of the Faithful: a History of the III. (Germanisches) SS-Panzer-Korps
- Otto Weidinger (1990, 1995, 2002, 2008, 2012): Das Reich: 2 SS Panzer Division Das Reich, Vol. I through V

== See also ==
- Waffen-SS in popular culture
