= Infantry Aces =

Book by Franz Kurowski

- Author: Franz Kurowski
- Language: English
- Genre: Historical fiction
- Publisher: J.J. Fedorowicz Publishing (1st ed., 1994); Ballantine Books (2002); Stackpole Books (2004)
- Publication date: 1994
- Publication place: Canada (1994); United States (2002)
- Media type: Print
- Followed by: Infantry Aces II

Infantry Aces is an English-language book by the German author Franz Kurowski. Originally released by the Canadian publisher of militaria literature J.J. Fedorowicz Publishing, it was later licensed by Fedorowicz to the American publishers Ballantine Books and Stackpole Books. The book was a commercial success and enjoyed a wide readership among the American public.

Infantry Aces has been criticised in the book The Myth of the Eastern Front: The Nazi–Soviet War in American Popular Culture by the historians Ronald Smelser and Edward J. Davies as ahistorical and misleading, presenting a picture of the German soldiers "without flaws or character defects". According to Smelser and Daivies, Kurowski's accounts, including Infantry Aces, are intended "to act as a memorial to these men".

== Background ==
Franz Kurowski (1923 − 2011) was a German author of fiction and non-fiction who is best known for producing apologist, revisionist and semi-fictional works on the history of the World War II. Kurowski's first publications appeared in the Nazi era; from 1958 until his death he worked as a freelance writer. He wrote 400 books for children and adults, under his own name and various pseudonyms. Kurowski wrote, among other things, for the weekly pulp war stories series Der Landser.

Kurowski produced numerous accounts featuring the Wehrmacht and the Waffen-SS, providing laudatory and non-peer reviewed wartime chronicles of military units and highly decorated soldiers. Historians dismiss his works, pointing out that Kurowski's journalistic writing style leads to embellishments and half-truths. Mixing fact and fiction, his accounts emphasize heroics rather than provide an authentic representation of the war experience, thereby conveying a distorted image of the German armed forces in World War II. A number of books by Kurowski has been published by far-right publishing houses such as the Pour le Mérite Verlag and the Verlag Bublies, leading to his writings being described as "journalism of gray and brown zone".

== Publication and contents ==
Kurowski's works were published in Germany since 1958, but remained inaccessible to English-speaking audiences. The Canadian publishing house J.J. Fedorowicz Publishing, that specialises in military subjects, released Kurowski's Infantry Aces in the U.S. in 1994. The book was later licensed by Fedorowicz to the American publishers Ballantine Books and Stackpole Books, which issued it in 2002 and 2004, respectively. The narratives in Infantry Aces do not include bibliographies or cite sources; some of the accounts are presented in the first person.

The book focuses on the combat careers of 8 highly decorated, but lesser known personnel of the Wehrmacht and the Waffen-SS during the Second World War. Smesler and Davies comment: "The actions of the men in (...) Infantry Aces suggest daring beyond imagination and a determination to carry on the fight no matter how unsurmountable the odds" and that "honour guided their actions and kindness towards their enemies marked their true nobility". The stories purport to be completely apolitical; book never mentions the Nazi party, the Holocaust nor why Germany had invaded the Soviet Union.

According to Smelser and Daivies, Kurowski's accounts, including Infantry Aces, celebrate the German soldiers who (in Kurowski's worldview) served their country honourably and fought valiantly against tremendous odds, only to return to Germany, as he puts it, "wounded and broken, ashamed and beaten". They write that the author's aim is to restore their reputation and that he "intends his books to act as an appropriate memorial to these men".

== Reception ==
The historians Ronald Smelser and Edward J. Davies describe Infantry Aces and its companion Panzer Aces, published by Fedorowicz in 1992, as "classics", noting that they "continue to enjoy a widespread and enthusiastic readership". In their analysis of the book, they write:

Kurowski gives the readers an almost heroic version of the German soldier, guiltless of any war crimes, actually incapable of such behavior. (...) Sacrifice and humility are his hallmarks. Their actions win them medals, badges and promotions, yet they remain indifferent to these awards. The cover art evokes heroism, determination and might of the German soldier and his weapons.

In addition to facts, Kurowski's writing contained fictional stories. The historian Roman Töppel notes that "it was regrettable that Kurowski was sometimes perceived as a historian worthy of a quote in foreign [non-German language] historical works." Thus, fictional claims of Kurowski found their way into the specialist literature. Smelser and Davies describe Kurowski's version of the war on the Eastern Front as "well-nigh chivalrous", with German troops "showing concerns for the Russian wounded, despite the many atrocities" of the Soviets against the Germans.

In one of Kurowski's accounts, a medic, Sergeant Schreiber, after turning back yet another "Russian" attack, notices a wounded Soviet soldier just beyond his trench. He pulls him to safety and tends to his wounds just as he does to those of the German soldiers. Kurowski writes: "their duties as medics superseded any differences in uniform". Many similar acts of "humanity" are present in the books, amounting to an image of the German fighting men "without flaws or character defects", while in stark contract to the realities of the "war of annihilation" on the Eastern Front. Smelser and Davies conclude that "Kurowski's accounts are laudatory texts that cast the German soldier in an extraordinarily favorable light".

== See also ==
- Waffen-SS in popular culture
- Myth of the "clean Wehrmacht"
- "Panzer ace" in popular culture
- Ace (military)
