= Panzer Aces =

Book series by Franz Kurowski

- Cover art of the 1st edition by J.J. Fedorowicz Publishing. According to The Myth of the Eastern Front:The Nazi–Soviet War in American Popular Culture , the cover art "evokes heroism, determination and might of the German soldier and his weapons".
- Author: Franz Kurowski
- Language: English
- Genre: Historical fiction
- Publisher: J.J. Fedorowicz Publishing (1st ed., 1992); Ballantine Books (2002); Stackpole Books (2004)
- Publication date: 1992
- Publication place: Canada (1992); United States (2002)
- Media type: Print
- Followed by: Panzer Aces II; Panzer Aces III

Panzer Aces is an English-language book series by the German author Franz Kurowski. Originally released in 1992 by J.J. Fedorowicz Publishing, a Canadian publisher of military literature, it was licensed in 2002 by the firm to American publishers Ballantine Books and Stackpole Books. The series' books were a commercial success and enjoyed a wide readership among the American public.

In their 2008 book The Myth of the Eastern Front: The Nazi–Soviet War in American Popular Culture, historians Ronald Smelser and Edward J. Davies criticise Panzer Aces as ahistorical and misleading, presenting a picture of the German soldiers "without flaws or character defects". According to the authors, Kurowski's accounts, including Panzer Aces, are intended "to act as a memorial to these men".

== Background ==
Franz Kurowski (1923−2011) was a German author of fiction and non-fiction who is best known for producing apologist, revisionist and semi-fictional works on the history of World War II. His first publications appeared in the Nazi era; from 1958 until his death he worked as a freelance writer. He wrote 400 books for children and adults under his own name and various pseudonyms. Among other things, Kurowski wrote for the weekly pulp war stories series Der Landser.

Kurowski produced numerous accounts featuring the Wehrmacht and the Waffen-SS, providing laudatory and non-peer-reviewed wartime chronicles of military units and highly decorated soldiers. Historians dismiss his works, pointing out that Kurowski's journalistic writing style leads to embellishments and half-truths. Mixing fact and fiction, his accounts emphasise heroics rather than provide an authentic representation of the war experience, thereby conveying a distorted image of the German armed forces in World War II. A number of Kurowski's books have been published by far-right publishing houses such as the Pour le Mérite Verlag and the Verlag Bublies, leading to his writings being described as "journalism of gray and brown zone".

== Publication and contents ==
Kurowski's works were published in Germany, beginning in 1958, but remained inaccessible to English-speaking audiences. The Canadian publishing house J.J. Fedorowicz Publishing, which specialises in World War II military literature, released Kurowski's Panzer Aces in the U.S. in 1992. The book was later licensed by Fedorowicz to the American publishers Ballantine Books and Stackpole Books, which issued it in 2002 and 2004, respectively. The narratives in Panzer Aces do not include bibliographies or cite sources; some of the accounts are presented in the first person.

The Panzer Aces series focuses on the combat careers of successful German tank commanders and popular Waffen-SS personalities such as Kurt "Panzermeyer" Meyer, Jochen Peiper, Paul Hausser, and Rudolf von Ribbentrop, the son of Reich Foreign Minister Joachim von Ribbentrop, among others. The series features a famous "panzer ace", Michael Wittmann, who enjoyed cult status in the popular perceptions of the Waffen-SS, along with the actions of another "ace", Franz Bäke, in the Cherkassy Pocket. In Kurowski's retelling, after fighting unit after unit of the Red Army, Bäke is able to establish a corridor to the trapped German forces, while "wiping out" the attacking Soviets. In another of Kurowski's accounts, while attempting to relieve the 6th Army encircled in Stalingrad, Bäke destroys thirty-two enemy tanks in a single engagement.

== Reception ==
Historians Ronald Smelser and Edward J. Davies describe Panzer Aces and its companion Infantry Aces, published by Fedorowicz in 1994, as "classics", noting that they "continue to enjoy a widespread and enthusiastic readership". In their analysis of the series, which also includes Panzer Aces II and Panzer Aces III, they write:

Kurowski gives the readers an almost heroic version of the German soldier, guiltless of any war crimes, actually incapable of such behavior. (...) Sacrifice and humility are his hallmarks. Their actions win them medals, badges and promotions, yet they remain indifferent to these awards. The cover art evokes heroism, determination and might of the German soldier and his weapons.

In addition to facts, Kurowski's writing contained fictional stories. The historian Roman Töppel notes that it is "regrettable that Kurowski was sometimes perceived as a culturally worthy historian in foreign [non-German language] historical studies." Thus, Kurowski's fictional claims found their way into serious literature. Smelser and Davies describe Kurowski's version of the war on the Eastern Front as "well-nigh chivalrous", with German troops "showing concerns for the Russian wounded, despite the many atrocities" of the Soviets against the Germans.

In one of Kurowski's accounts, Michael Wittmann takes out eighteen tanks in a single engagement, for which Sepp Dietrich, Wittmann's commanding officer, presents him with an Iron Cross and inquires whether Wittmann has a request. Without hesitation, Wittmann requests assistance for a wounded "Russian" soldier that he spotted. Many similar acts of "humanity" are present in the books, amounting to an image of the German fighting men "without flaws or character defects". Smelser and Davies conclude that "Kurowski's accounts are laudatory texts that cast the German soldier in an extraordinarily favorable light".

According to Smelser and Davies, Kurowski's accounts, including Panzer Aces, celebrate the German soldiers who (in Kurowski's worldview) served their country honourably and fought valiantly against tremendous odds, only to return to Germany, as he puts it, "wounded and broken, ashamed and beaten". They write that the author's aim is to restore their reputation and that he "intends his books to act as an appropriate memorial to these men".

== See also ==
- Waffen-SS in popular culture
- Myth of the "clean Wehrmacht"
- "Panzer ace" in popular culture
- Ace (military)
