= Franz Kurowski =

German author (1923–2011)

- Portrait of Kurowski as it appeared on the web site of the publishing house Verlag Bublies
- Born: November 17, 1923
- Died: May 28, 2011 (aged 87)
- Writing career
- Pen name: Karl Alman; Heinrich H. Bernig; Hanns-Heinz Gatow; Rüdiger Greif; Franz K. Kaufmann; Kurt Kollatz; Volkmar Kühn; Arturo Molinero; Hrowe H. Saunders; Johanna Schulz; Joachim von Schaulen; Heinrich Schulze-Dirschau
- Language: German; English
- Genres: Popular history of World War II; Historical fiction Militaria; Children's literature
- Notable works: Der Landser (multiple issues); Panzer Aces (book series); Infantry Aces

Franz Kurowski (November 17, 1923 − May 28, 2011) was a German author of fiction and non-fiction who specialised in World War II topics. He is best known for producing apologist, negationist and semi-fictional works on the history of the war, including the popular English-language series Panzer Aces and Infantry Aces.

Kurowski's first publications appeared during the Nazi era; from 1958 until his death he worked as a freelance writer. He wrote 400 books for children and adults, under his own name and various pseudonyms. Kurowski wrote, among other things, for the weekly pulp war stories series Der Landser.

Kurowski produced numerous accounts featuring the Wehrmacht and the Waffen-SS, providing laudatory and non-peer reviewed wartime chronicles of military units and highly decorated personnel. Historians have dismissed his works, pointing out that Kurowski mixed fact and fiction and advances the discredited concept of Nur-Soldat ("merely soldier"). Rather than providing an authentic representation of the war experience, his works emphasized heroics and convey a distorted image of the German armed forces in World War II. Critics have been dismissive of Kurowski, describing him as a "hackwriter" and his works as Landser-pulp ("soldier-pulp") and "laudatory texts", that provide a "mix of fact and fancy".

Kurowski's books have strong denialist tendencies; he held onto Nazi propaganda's military and civilian statistics and presented history devoid of any crimes by the Wehrmacht or the Waffen-SS. A number of his books have been published by far-right publishing houses such as the Türmer Verlag, the Arndt Verlag, and the Pour le Mérite Verlag.

== Education and career ==
Born on 17 November 1923, Kurowski grew up in Dortmund and, after primary school, trained as a turner. From 1942, he served as a soldier in World War II in southeast Europe and North Africa, where he completed his training as a radio operator, a parachutist, and interpreter of Modern Greek. In 1942, he was awarded the Storyteller Prize for his work in the Wacht im Südosten (Southeast Watch). These were propaganda publications (100 or so pamphlets) issued by the Propagandakompanie, the propaganda wing of the Wehrmacht and the Waffen-SS.

After 1945, he returned to civilian occupation and worked as a foreman and supervisor in a machinery factory. In 1958, he started working as a freelance writer; from 1968 to 1978, he was the editor of Die Oase (Oasis), a periodical of Deutsches Afrika-Korps e.V, the German Afrika Korps veterans' association. From 1989 to 1996, Kurowski was editor-in-chief of the far-right publication Nation Europa, then named Deutsche Monatshefte. Kurowski died in 2011.

== Work for Der Landser ==
Kurowski wrote for the weekly pulp series Der Landser (a colloquial term for a German army soldier, used during World War II). Since its founding, the magazine was criticized for glorifying war and delivering a distorted image of the Wehrmacht and Nazi Germany during World War II. The details of his novels and semi-fictional accounts was accurate regarding minor technical details, but their content was often inauthentic and withheld important contextual information from the reader. Antisemitism, German war crimes, the repressive nature of the German government, and the causes of the war were not mentioned. German news magazine Der Spiegel once described Der Landser as the "expert journal for the whitewashing of the Wehrmacht".

== Portrayal of the Wehrmacht and the Waffen-SS ==
Historians Ronald Smelser and Edward J. Davies, in their 2008 work The Myth of the Eastern Front, characterise Kurowski as one of the principal Wehrmacht and Waffen-SS "gurus", or authors popular among the readers who, in their opinion, romanticize the German war effort on the Eastern Front, and in particular the Waffen-SS, alongside authors such as Richard Landwehr, an ardent admirer of the Waffen-SS, and the far-right writer and publisher Patrick Agte. The book describes the gurus as authors who "have picked up and disseminated the myths of the Wehrmacht in a wide variety of popular publications that romanticize the German struggle in Russia".

=== Aces series ===
Kurowski's works were published in Germany since 1958, but remained inaccessible to English-speaking audiences. J.J. Fedorowicz Publishing, whom Smelser and Davies describe as a leading publisher of war-romancing literature, released Kurowski's two popular works, Panzer Aces and Infantry Aces, in the U.S. in 1992 and 1994. In their analysis of the series, which also included Panzer Aces II and Panzer Aces III, Smelser and Davies write:

Kurowski gives the readers an almost heroic version of the German soldier, guiltless of any war crimes, actually incapable of such behavior. (...) Sacrifice and humility are his hallmarks. Their actions win them medals, badges and promotions, yet they remain indifferent to these awards. The cover art evokes heroism, determination and might of the German soldier and his weapons.

The Panzer Aces series focuses on the combat careers of successful German tank commanders and popular Waffen-SS personalities such as Kurt "Panzermeyer" Meyer, Jochen Peiper, Paul Hausser, and Rudolf von Ribbentrop, the son of Reich Foreign Minister, Joachim von Ribbentrop, among others, who Kurowski terms "aces". The series features a famous "panzer ace" Michael Wittmann, who enjoyed cult status in the popular perceptions of the Waffen-SS, along with the actions of another "ace", Franz Bäke, in the Cherkassy Pocket. In Kurowski's retelling, after fighting unit after unit of the Red Army, Bäke is able to establish a corridor to the trapped German forces, while "wiping out" the attacking Soviets. In another of Kurowski's accounts, while attempting to relieve the 6th Army encircled in Stalingrad, Bäke destroys thirty-two enemy tanks in a single engagement. The narratives in Panzer Aces do not include bibliographies or cite sources; the account of Ribbentrop is presented in the first person.

=== Highly decorated soldiers ===
Kurowski produced numerous books featuring highly decorated personnel of the Wehrmacht and Waffen-SS, including Luftwaffe pilots and U-boat commanders of Nazi Germany's navy (the Kriegsmarine). His works include books about fighter aces Hans-Joachim Marseille (under the title German Fighter Ace Hans-Joachim Marseille: The Life Story of the Star of Africa), Otto Kittel, Heinrich Bär, and Joachim Müncheberg, along with the "panzer ace" Kurt Knispel. Many of these were reprinted in the 1990–2000s by the German publisher Flechsig Verlag.

Kurowski wrote extensively about successful U-boat commanders, "U-boat aces" in his terminology, including Helmut Witte, Johann Mohr, and Heinrich Lehmann-Willenbrock. Under the pen name Karl Alman, he wrote a hagiography of Wolfgang Lüth, "the most successful U-boat commandant of the Second World War" (according to the subtitle), and many more.

In addition to works on individual military men, Kurowski wrote compilations such as Ritter der sieben Meere: Ritterkreuzträger der U-Boot-Waffe (Knights of the Seven Seas: Knight's Cross Winners of the U-boat Arm), published in 1975. The book was published in the U.S. as Knight's Cross Holders of the U-Boat Service by Schiffer Publishing. U.S. based editions also included Luftwaffe Aces published by J.J. Fedorowicz and Panzergrenadier Aces: German Mechanized Infantrymen in World War II, Jump Into Hell: German Paratroopers in World War II, and The Brandenburger Commandos: Germany's Elite Warrior Spies in World War II, published by Stackpole Books in 1997.

=== U-boat war ===
Kurowski, under his own name and as Karl Alman, wrote numerous accounts of Nazi Germany's U-boat warfare, starting with the 1965 book Angriff, ran, versenken; Die U-Bootschlacht im Atlantik (Attack, At 'em, Sink: The U-boat Battle of the Atlantic). He followed up with the 1967 Graue Wölfe in blauer See. Der Einsatz der deutschen U-Boote im Mittelmeer (Gray Wolves in Blue Sea: Deployment of the German U-boats in the Mediterranean); according to the preface to this semi-fictional account, the book described the war "as it actually happened".

The German scholar Hans Wagener classifies Kurowski's 1981 book Günther Prien, der Wolf und sein Admiral (Günther Prien, the Wolf and his Admiral), published by Druffel Verlag, as an "almost perfect example of a skillful distillation of the Nazi understanding of the Second World War". The Canadian historian Michael Hadley comments on Kurowski's goals for the narrative:

Here he wished to commemorate the "meritorious soldier and human being Günther Prien [who is] forgotten neither by the old submariners nor" —and this would have startled most observers in Germany today [in 1995] —"by the young submariners of the Federal German Navy".

In a work that examines the role of Landser-pulp ("soldier-pulp") literature in the East German neo-Nazi movement, Dirk Wilking, head of the Mobile Advisory Team for the Brandenburg Institute for Community Consultation, uses Kurowski's 1982 volume Jagd auf "graue Wölfe", 1943 (Hunt for "Gray Wolves", 1943) to describe the ideological content of Landser-pulp: "war is described as consisting of random coincidences and as a fateful interplay; no questions of guilt or consequences are raised. The concepts of war are described in the terms of Nazi wartime propaganda, such as 'drama', 'tragedy' and 'fate' (direct quotes from Gray Wolves). This not only has a war-trivialising effect, but also shows war as a desirable state". The "divine principle of war as a duty" and a "natural event" is a hallmark of such works, Wilking concludes. It also features pictures of sinking ships and U-boat militaria.

In 1957, military historian Jürgen Rohwer began a critical examination of the data published on the sunken tonnage claimed by Nazi U-boat commanders. Afterwards, Kurowski was among the authors who held on to the details of the Nazi propaganda regardless of Rohwer's research results.

== Historical negationism ==
=== World War II series and Battle of Stalingrad ===
Kurowski played a key role in the negationiost series So war der Zweite Weltkrieg (And thus was the Second World War), a seven-volume pseudo history of World War II. The project was launched in 1989 by the Verlagsgesellschaft Berg, one of the largest right-wing publishing groups. For the series, Kurowski was listed as editorial staff. The series was reissued by Flechsig Verlag in the 2000s under Kurowski's name. In the foreword to the 1994 book Rechtsextremismus in Deutschland (Right-wing Extremism in Germany) by Wolfgang Benz, the historian and journalist Hans Sarkowicz described the book project as an example of the "nationalist battle painting" in the "journalism of gray and brown zone."

According to Insa Eschebach, director of the Ravensbrück National Memorial, Kurowski's 1992 book Stalingrad. Die Schlacht, die Hitlers Mythos zerstört (Stalingrad: The battle that Destroyed Hitler's Myth) serves "primarily to rehabilitate the decent, powerful German soldiers". The term "war criminals" appears only in quotation marks; the "brilliant successes of the Wehrmacht" is the key theme, along with the "victimhood" and "downfall of German soldiers". Kurowski considers Stalingrad as the "Golgotha of the 6th Army," without mentioning that this religious metaphor comes from the 1953 book Stalingrad – bis zur letzten Patrone (Stalingrad: To the Last Bullet), written by Heinz Schröter, a former member of a propaganda company: "When it comes to Stalingrad as Golgotha of the 6th army, it begs the question: 'Why was a German army even there'"?

=== Bombing of Dresden ===
Kurowski wrote several books that discuss the February 1945 Allied air raids on Dresden. His book Das Massaker von Dresden und der anglo-amerikanische Bombenterror 1944/45 (The Massacre of Dresden and the Anglo-American Terror Bombing in 1944/45) was published by the extreme right-wing publisher Druffel Verlag in 1996. His other books on the subject, Bomben über Dresden (Bombs Over Dresden) and Dresden, followed in 2001 and 2003.

In the context of the World War II bombing campaigns, Kurowski's interpretation of the air war and the Dresden raid hued closely to the account offered by Hans Rumpf, the German fire protection inspector during World War II and postwar author. Both Rumpf and Kurowski used the term "terror-bombing" exclusively to describe Allied air attacks, and presented the Luftwaffe raids against purely civilian targets as "retaliation attacks". In his writings, Kurowski emphasised that the Allied propaganda "hugely exaggerated" the effects of these raids.

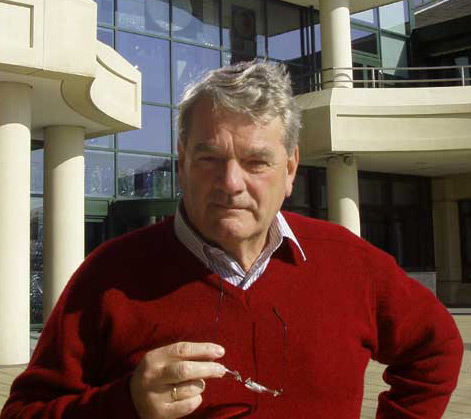
Kurowski's negationist works on the bombing of Dresden, including Bombs over Dresden, were influenced by the British Holocaust denier David Irving.

The Dutch historian Bastiaan Robert von Benda-Beckmann includes Kurowski in his discussion of the German historiography of the Allied bombing campaign. Discussing the 1977 Der Luftkrieg über Deutschland (The Air War Over Germany) and The Massacre of Dresden, he classifies Kurowski as belonging to the group of German authors who were "inspired" by British Holocaust denier David Irving. Similar to Irving, these authors were growing "more radical and determined in their beliefs"; they condemned the Allies as "brutal mass murderers". In his works on Dresden and the air war, Kurowski challenges the narrative of "German guilt", writing: "German historians were subjected to a position to silence them and to write on the everlasting German guilt for everything". Kurowski was among the German authors who cited British major general J. F. C. Fuller's theory that the air raid on Dresden was a planned programme of genocide. Fuller, retired since 1933, was a supporter of Oswald Mosley, founder of the British Union of Fascists.

Kurowski's books use long-refuted numbers and statements, some of which date back to declarations from the Reich Propaganda Ministry. Bombs over Dresden included sixteen pages of supposed eyewitness reports (long since identified as invented) of low-flying aircraft hunting civilians, as German authors Lars-Broder Keil and Sven Felix Kellerhoff point out in their book Deutsche Legenden (German Legends). Keil and Kellerhoff also criticise his use of a statistic of 60,000 victims that was allegedly provided by the Federal Statistical Office of Germany. Such official calculations, as described by Kurowski, did not exist.

Kurowski started with a higher claimed number of casualties. In a 2005 article in the German periodical Die Welt, Kellerhoff referred to Kurowski's claims of 275,000 dead, allegedly from the Red Cross. Kellerhoff included Kurowski in the list of authors who provided highly exaggerated numbers, such as Fuller, who claimed the figure of half a million dead, and the German right-wing extremist and Holocaust denier Manfred Roeder, who gave the number of 480,000 dead. Kurowski's Bombs over Dresden reproduced the numbers of 200,000 dead, first released by the Propaganda Ministry on February 25, 1945; the undisclosed official German estimate at the time was 20,204 dead. This latter number became public in 1977, and the widespread exaggerations have long been refuted.

== Authenticity and accuracy ==
Kurowski's works strive to provide an experience of the war "as it happened", but his writing style often leads to embellishments and half-truths. Kurowski frequently mixes fact and fiction in his accounts, providing a distorted image of the German military and advancing the post-war concept of Nur-Soldat ("merely soldier"). In his 1995 book Count Not the Dead: The Popular Image of the German Submarine, Canadian historian Michael Hadley panned Kurowski's works as "hackwork" and "pulp-trade yarn". He described Kurowski as a "pulp-novelist" and a "hack-writer".

Hadley writes that Kurowski heavily relies on already published materials, such as in his work Knights of the Seven Seas. Subtitled Chronicle of Sacrifice, the book recycles U-boat mythology, such as the "27,082 dead who bravely faced the opponent" (an allusion to the "senseless sacrifice" of the men of the U-boat arm by the German high command). Hadley notes that "much of the data is correct: names, places, ships sunk and medals won", but the accounts are "a mix of facts and fancy" that hew closely to Nazi-era hagiographic accounts about German U-boat commanders.

Former soldiers interviewed by Kurowski for his books noted that their accounts, as published, contained considerable distortion and embellishments and in many instances non-existent. One soldier, Rolf Kliemann, suggested improvements to Kurowski but these were ignored. Kliemann stated that "Kurowski just filled the facts with fanciful tales..."

In their discussion on the romanticisation of the Wehrmacht and the Waffen-SS, Smelser and Davies point out the gurus' (including Kurowski's) extensive knowledge of militaria, as these authors "insist on authenticity in their writings [and] combine a painfully accurate knowledge of the details (...), ranging from vehicles to uniforms to medals, with a romantic heroicisation of the German army fighting to save Europe from a rapacious Communism".

Smelser and Davies describe Kurowski's version of the war on the Eastern Front as "well-nigh chivalrous", with German troops "showing concerns for the Russian wounded, despite the many atrocities" of the Soviets against the Germans. In one of Kurowski's accounts, Michael Wittmann takes out eighteen tanks in a single engagement, for which Sepp Dietrich, Wittmann's commanding officer, presents him with an Iron Cross and inquires whether Wittmann has a request. Without hesitation, Wittmann requests assistance for a wounded "Russian" soldier that he spotted. Many similar acts of "humanity" are present in the books, amounting to an image of the German fighting men "without flaws or character defects". Smelser and Davies conclude that "Kurowski's accounts are laudatory texts that cast the German soldier in an extraordinarily favorable light".

According to Hadley, Kurowski focuses on "hero-making" at the expense of historical truth. In addition to facts, his writing contained fictional stories. The historian Roman Töppel notes that it is "regrettable that Kurowski was sometimes perceived as a culturally worthy historian in foreign [non-German language] historical studies." Thus, fictional assertions of Kurowski found their way into the literature on World War II.

In an article commemorating the 60th anniversary of the Dresden bombing, the German newspaper Berliner Zeitung summed up Kurowski's career as an author of "cookie-cutter" books about "Final Battles for the Reich", "Eagle Calls from Führer Headquarters" and "Assault Guns in Action". The paper interviewed two Dresden booksellers who refused to carry Kurowski's 1996 Massacre of Dresden, quoting one of them: "It's right-wing nonsense. The book mentions 200,000 dead but does not provide a source. There's no bibliography at all".

== Selected pen names ==
Kurowski published many of his books under pseudonyms, depending on the topic. By his own admission, he used his given name, Kurowski, for "more serious work", and typically reserved his pseudonyms for works of fiction. However, there are cases where the same works were published under his real name and a pseudonym by different publishers. A biography of General Hasso von Manteuffel, credited to both Kurowski and Joachim von Schaulen, is one such example. His many pen names included:

- Karl Alman
  - Panzer vor: Die dramatische Geschichte der deutschen Panzerwaffe und ihre tapferen Soldaten (Panzer: The Dramatic Story of the German Armored Forces and their Brave Soldiers) Flechsig, 2006 (unaltered reprint of the 1966 edition).
  - Wolfgang Lüth. Der erfolgreiche U-Boot-Kommandant des Zweiten Weltkriegs (Wolfgang Lüth: The Most Successful Submarine Commander of World War II)
- Heinrich H. Bernig
  - Schlacht der Giganten. Opfergang der Panzermänn (Battle of the Giants: Sacrifice of Panzer-man) Pour le Mérite Verlag. Publishes negationist, xenophobic and pseudoscientific works, including materials from the Nazi era. Reissued in 2006 by Landwehr.
  - SS-Kavallerie im Osten. Vom 1. SS-Totenkopf-Reiterregiment zur SS-Reiterbrigade Fegelein (SS Cavalry in the East: SS Death Head Regiment of Equestrian Brigade Fegelein). Far-right publisher Arndt Verlag.
- Karl Kollatz
  - Narratives for Der Landser series.
- Hanns-Heinz Gatow
- Rüdiger Greif
  - Die Jugendbuchreihe Die Funk-Füchse (1981–1984). Young adult series.
- Franz K. Kaufmann
  - Malta muss fallen : Eine histor. Erzählung (Malta Must Fall: A Historical Narrative). Engelbert-Verlag, 1960.
  - Aufstand in Hellas ("Uprising in Hellas"). Engelbert, 1960.
- Volkmar Kühn
  - Mit Rommel in der Wüste. Kampf und Untergang des Deutschen Afrika-Korps 1941–1943 (With Rommel in the Desert: Struggle and Downfall of the German Africa Corps 1941–1943). Flechsig.
  - Torpedoboote und Zerstörer im Einsatz 1939–1945. Kampf und Untergang einer Waffe (Torpedo Boats and Destroyers in Action 1939–1945: Struggle and Downfall). Motorbuch-Verlag (1974)
  - Deutsche Fallschirmjäger im Zweiten Weltkrieg. Grüne Teufel im Sprungeinsatz und Erdkampf 1939–1945 (German Paratroopers in World War II: Green Hell in Parachute Drop and Ground Fighting) . Flechsig, 2006.
  - Tiger: die Geschichte einer legendären Waffe 1942–1945 (Tiger: The Story of a Legendary Weapon) Motorbuch Verlag, 1976. Transportation and militaria publisher.
- Johanna Schulz
  - Vier fahren nach Griechenland (Four Go to Greece).
  - Fahrt ins Verderben: Einsatz d. Ein-Mann-Torpedos (Ride to Destruction: Use of One-man Torpedoes). Zimmermann (1960).
  - Der letzte Torpedo. U 201 auf grosser Fahrt. (1960)
- Hrowe H. Saunders
- Joachim von Schaulen
- Heinrich Schulze-Dirschau
  - Oder-Neisse: muss Deutschland verzichten? (Oder-Neisse: Will Germany be Without It?). Verlagsgesellschaft Berg, with Türmer Verlag, 1991. Far-right publisher.
  - Der deutsche Osten: vom Ordensland Preussen zum Kernstaat des deutschen Reiches (The German East: Order Region as Core State of the German Empire). Türmer-Verlag, 1989. Far-right publisher.

== See also ==
- Myth of the clean Wehrmacht
- Waffen-SS in popular culture
- War crimes of the Wehrmacht
