= Panzer ace =

Highly decorated German tank commander

Panzer ace (tank ace) is a contemporary term used in English-speaking popular culture to describe highly decorated German tank ("panzer") commanders and crews during World War II. The Wehrmacht as well as British and American militaries did not recognise the concept of an "ace" during the war. The similar term, tank ace has been used post-war to describe highly regarded tanks commanders.

The term "panzer ace" has become prominent in contemporary popular culture in English-language militaria and popular history works, especially in the United States. English translations of German author Franz Kurowski's use the term in his Panzer Aces series, which focuses on highly decorated tank commanders such as Michael Wittmann and Franz Bäke.

In the early 2000s, German historian Sönke Neitzel and American military author Steven Zaloga, amongst others, began to examine the combat performance of highly decorated German tank crews during the war. Zaloga argued that the term "panzer ace" is a romanticisation of reality mixed with propaganda, as it is neither possible to correctly determine "tank kills" in the heat of battle, nor to separate individual performance from technological or battlefield advantage. In contrast, British historian Robert Kershaw argues that the large number of tanks destroyed by some German commanders can be attributed to the skills they gained through years of combat.

== Wartime perceptions ==
During World War II the concept received little attention. To the extent that the concept existed, it was mainly advanced by the Waffen-SS as part of its contributions to Nazi Germany's propaganda campaigns. In most German Army (Heer) units, tank crews and commanders generally received awards for mission performance rather than tank kills.

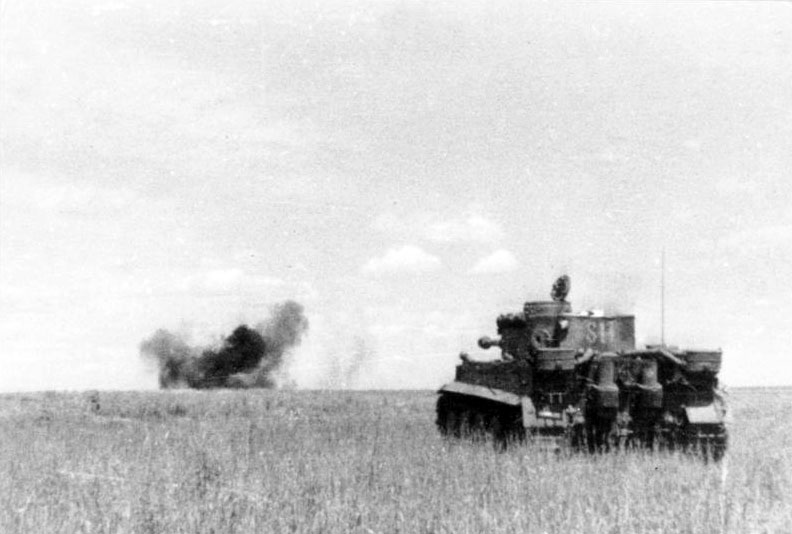
A Tiger I tank during the Battle of Kursk in June 1943. Most of the successful German tank commanders served in units equipped with Tigers during this period.

German highly decorated tank commanders were most often soldiers who served in units equipped with Tiger I or Tiger II tanks between mid-1943 and mid-1944. The Allies did not have any tanks capable of easily defeating the Tigers during this period. Few soldiers who operated Panther tanks at this time received the same high decorations, as these tanks were more vulnerable to Allied tanks and initially less mechanically reliable than the Tiger. Historian Dennis Showalter has suggested that the confidence which the crews of Tigers and the operators of other relatively advanced weapons had in the capabilities of their equipment may have reinforced their ideological conditioning, and encouraged them to take risks in combat.

The United States Army did not recognize the concept of "tank aces" during World War II, with proposals to do so being rejected. US Army tank commanders such as Lafayette G. Pool and Creighton Abrams were responsible for the destruction of large numbers of German tanks and other armoured vehicles. Abrams credited the success of his tank to the gunner. The US Army's weekly magazine Yank (which was not available to the public) featured several successful tank commanders such as Pool. The March 1945 Yank described Pool as "the ace of American tankers" and stated that "[he] is an almost unbelievable document of total victory." A 1943 New York Times story also labelled Chinese Major General Hoo Hsien-Chung as a "tank ace" for the actions of a force under his command during the 1938 Battle of Taierzhuang.

Similarly, the British Army did not recognise any tank aces. Some British Sherman Firefly tanks destroyed several German tanks.

In the opinion of George Forty, the Soviet Red Army did not regard destroying tanks as an act of particular heroism for its tank commanders, as the main role of its armoured units was to support infantry. According to Russian military historian Mikhail Polikarpov, in contrast to the German model, the Russian concept was based on the heroic acts or deeds the soldier achieved. The Soviet Military Review magazine notes further: "The tankmen's heroic deeds were popularised over the radio, in special orders of the day, in newspapers and leaflets, and in individual talks with servicemen. Some tanks, whose crews had distinguished themselves most in action, were given, by order of tank formation commanders, the name of Russian generals or of the heroes of the units, who had fallen fighting for their country." The most successful award recipient of the Hero of the Soviet Union was published in accommodation of a portrait photo. Overall, English newspapers devoted a lot of space to aircraft and naval tallies, human interest stories, and the Eastern Front, but paid little attention to tank combat.

== Contemporary use ==
The German author Franz Kurowski covered "panzer aces" in several of his hagiographic accounts. Published in the U.S. by J.J. Fedorowicz Publishing in the 1990s and by Stackpole Books in the 2010s, his popular series Panzer Aces describes fictionalised careers of highly decorated German soldiers during World War II. A veteran of the Eastern Front (as a member of a propaganda company), Kurowski is one of the authors who "have picked up and disseminated the myths of the Wehrmacht in a wide variety of popular publications that romanticize the German struggle in Russia", according to The Myth of the Eastern Front: The Nazi–Soviet War in American Popular Culture by historians Ronald Smelser and Edward Davies.

The most famous German "panzer ace", Michael Wittmann, is credited by Kurowski as having destroyed 60 tanks and nearly as many anti-tank guns in the course of a few days near Kiev in November 1943. According to historian Steven Zaloga, Wittmann was credited with about 135 tanks destroyed – although 120 of those were made on the Eastern Front from a Tiger tank. After the war, Wittmann gained a cult status among admirers of the Wehrmacht, the Waffen-SS, and tank warfare. Kurowski's book also describes the actions of "panzer ace" Franz Bäke in the Cherkassy Pocket. In Kurowski's retelling, after fighting unit after unit of the Red Army, Bäke was able to establish a corridor to the trapped German forces, and then "wiped out" the attacking Soviets. In another of Kurowski's accounts, while attempting to relieve the German 6th Army encircled in Stalingrad, Bäke destroyed 32 enemy tanks in a single engagement.

== Analysis ==
The concept of what constitutes success in tank battles has received considerable attention in recent years. The historian Sönke Neitzel questions the numbers of tanks destroyed attributed in popular culture to various tank commanders. According to Neitzel, numbers of successes by highly decorated soldiers should be approached with caution as it is rarely possible to determine reliably, in the heat of the battle, how many tanks were destroyed and by whom. The Wehrmacht's intelligence service on the Eastern Front, the Fremde Heere Ost (FHO), routinely reduced the reported number of Soviet tanks being destroyed by 30 to 50 per cent in their own statistics to make up for double counting and repairable vehicles. Zaloga considers these numbers to be reasonably accurate tallies of actual Soviet tank losses.

At the time of Operation Citadel (which led to the Battle of Kursk) and during the subsequent Soviet counteroffensives in the summer of 1943, German combat units claimed 16,250 tanks and assault guns destroyed. According to Zetterling, the high command was a little too drastic with its 50% reduction, and a reduction of claims by 42% would have been more accurate.

The historian Steven Zaloga opines that "tank kill claims during World War II on all sides should be taken with a grain of salt". Zaloga uses the term "tank ace" in quotation marks in his 2015 work Armored Champion: The Top Tanks of World War II. He notes the "romantic nonsense" of the popular inclination to imagine a tank versus tank engagement as an "armoured joust" – two opponents facing each other – with the "more valiant or better-armed [one] the eventual victor". In reality, most tank to tank combat involved one tank ambushing the other, and the most successful tank commanders were generally "bushwhackers" with "a decided advantage in firepower or armour, and often both".

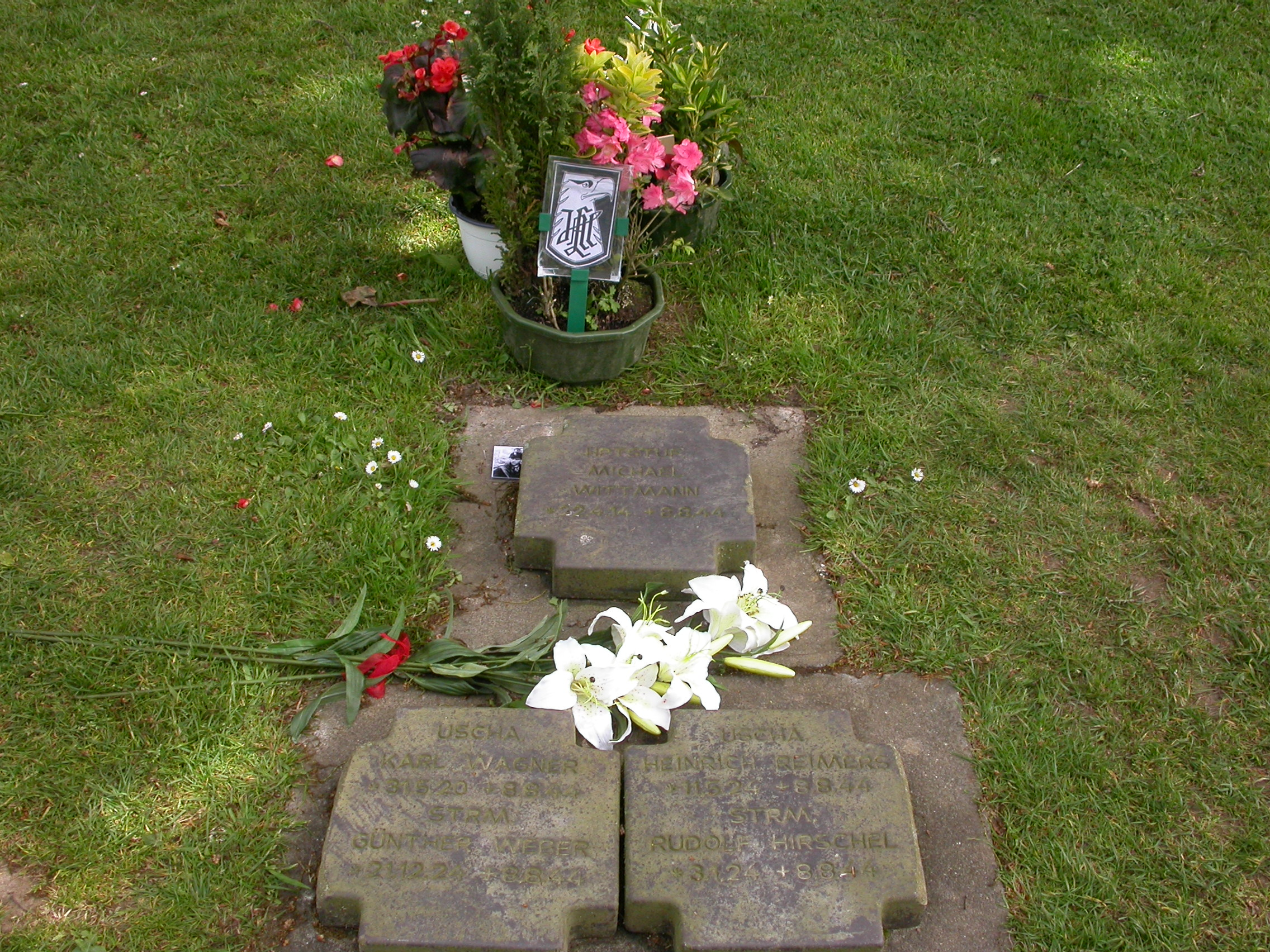
The grave of "panzer ace" Michael Wittmann and his tank crew in 2007

Zaloga uses Wittmann's career to illustrate the point of the battlefield advantage. He credits Wittmann with "about 135" tanks destroyed, but points out that Wittmann achieved 120 of these in 1943, operating a Tiger I tank on the Eastern Front. Having advantages both in firepower and in armour, the Tiger I was "nearly invulnerable in a frontal engagement" against any of the Soviet tanks of that time. Wittmann thus could "kill its opponents long before they were close enough to inflict damage on his tank". Zaloga concludes: "Most of the 'tank aces' of World War II were simply lucky enough to have an invulnerable tank with a powerful gun". He has also written that "the considerable attention paid to German tank aces in recent years obscures the fact that they were an exception to the rule and that most of the anonymous young German tankers in late 1944 were thrown into combat with poor training".

Historian John Buckley has also criticised accounts of Wittmann's career, arguing that "many historians through to today continue to repackage unquestioningly Nazi propaganda" by repeating false claims that Wittmann's tank single-handedly defeated a British offensive in Normandy. In reality, this tactical success was achieved by the entire unit Wittmann formed part of, but was attributed only to him as part of a propaganda campaign.

Author Robert Kershaw, in his book Tank Men, refers to a "tank ace" being the minority of tank commanders that accounted for the most destroyed enemy armour, saying it is roughly analogous with a flying ace. He says some tank aces like Wittmann encapsulate what cumulative skills from years of combat in multiple campaigns may achieve.

British author George Forty writes that some German tanks (in particular the Tiger I) were often better armoured and armed than their allied counterparts, which often helped the survivability of crews, enabling them to either win engagements or at least survive encounters so as to be able to fight again. Forty notes that the expertise and bravery of tankmen who had achieved high numbers of "kills", such as Michael Wittmann, was also a factor. He points out that there were tank commanders, like Buck Kite and Lafayette Pool, who still had success in their tanks despite them being inferior to the tanks they opposed.

== Contributing factors to success ==
Many factors are cited as contributing to the success of a tank crew. Training was an important factor, and George Forty concludes that German tank training had the edge on others, at least partially because they had started training programs long before others did. Forty notes that many regarded Soviet training as inadequate and too short; for instance, crews drove on the peaks of hills to avoid rough terrain, which made them more visible targets, and they continued to do this throughout the war, with no training or experience correcting this.

The difference in armour and firepower is undeniably a factor. Though at times the Germans found themselves to be at a disadvantage (initially against the British Matilda II in North Africa and against the T-34 in 1941 in Russia), as noted the Tiger I had an advantage over many allied tanks, e.g. T-34s. Successful German tank aces were often in Tigers, including Johannes Kümmel, Michael Wittmann, Hyazinth Graf von Strachwitz, Otto Carius, Johannese Bolter and Martin Shroif. Some tank aces used the Jagdpanzer, such as Rudolf Roy from the 12th SS Panzer Division.

The Panthers and Tigers caused consternation in Allied tank crews, and the 75 mm gun of the early model Sherman tank was seen as inadequate against these tanks. However, Kershaw points out that having a technical advantage over the enemy in terms of armour isn't absolutely decisive. The French had superior tanks in terms of armour and firepower to the Germans at the start of the war; however, the training and doctrine of the French armoured forces was inferior and patchy compared to the Germans.

Both British and German veterans also noted that a good crew working together, helped success in tank combat. Panzer ace Michael Wittmann noted the importance of a good crew as being necessary for an effective tank. In particular, he noted the importance of the gunner, and when he was honoured with the Knight's Cross award for tank combat, he said he would only accept it if his gunner, Balthasar ("Bobby") Woll, was also honoured in the same manner.

== See also ==
- Waffen-SS in popular culture
- Ace (military)
- Flying ace
