= Arndt Verlag =

German neo-Nazi publishing house

- Status: Active
- Founded: 1963; 62 years ago
- Country of origin: West Germany; Germany
- Headquarters location: Kiel
- Key people: Dietmar Munier
- Fiction genres: Historical negationism Holocaust denial Militaria

Arndt Verlag is a German publishing house that belongs to the publishing group of the neo-Nazi publisher Dietmar Munier. It specialises in historical negationist literature. Arndt's authors include David Irving, Wilfred von Oven, Franz Kurowski and Franz W. Seidler.

== History and reception ==
Arndt Verlag was founded in 1963 by Heinz von Arndt, who was a member of the neo-Nazi Deutsche Reichspartei and later of the NPD. In 1983, the publisher Dietmar Munier took over the publishing house and integrated it into his publishing company. Munier built Arndt into one of the largest and most important right-wing publishing houses in Germany.

According to the State Office for the Protection of the Constitution of Schleswig-Holstein, Arndt Verlag is trying to "give readers a positive picture of the national-socialist terror". The Federal Office for the Protection of the Constitution mentions the publishing house in its reports for 2009, 2010, 2011 and 2012. Its illustrated books "gloss over the Nazi period" and glorify the military techniques of the "Third Reich". Arndt's publications advance a German claim over the Sudetenland.

== Authors ==
Arndt Verlag's authors included Holocaust deniers and pro-Nazi authors such as:

- David Irving
- Franz Kurowski
- Wilfred von Oven
- Franz W. Seidler
- Gustav Sichelschmidt
- Günter Zehm

== See also ==
- Holocaust denial
- Myth of the clean Wehrmacht
- Waffen-SS in popular culture
