= Devil's Guard =

Book purporting to be about a former German SS officer in the First Indochina War

- Author: George Robert Elford
- Language: English
- Publisher: Delacorte Press
- Publication date: 1971
- Dewey Decimal: 959.703
- LC Class: DS550 .E38

Devil's Guard is a book by George Robert Elford, first published in 1971. The work purports to be the true account of a former German Waffen-SS officer's combat experiences during World War II on the Eastern Front and later during the First Indochina War as a member of the French Foreign Legion. Although presented as non-fiction, military historians have questioned its authenticity, and the book is generally categorized as fiction. In 2006, AbeBooks reported that Devil's Guard was among the ten most frequently sold books to American soldiers in Iraq, and the only war fiction in that top ten.

== Plot ==
The narrative is presented as the first-person account of "Hans Josef Wagemueller", a former Waffen-SS officer. The story begins with the German surrender in 1945, as Wagemueller is fighting Soviet forces and partisans near Czechoslovakia. He escapes Allied capture by fighting westward and using an underground network to reach Switzerland, where he joins the French Foreign Legion. There, he reunites with two former sergeants from his old unit, Bernard Eisner and Erich Schulze, and is subsequently deployed to French Indochina.

In Indochina, Wagemueller and his comrades are initially integrated into mixed Legion units containing French territorial troops. However, under the command of French Colonel Simon Houssong, Wagemueller is given command of an all-German battalion of approximately 900 men, composed of former Nazi soldiers who, like him, had joined the Legion. Their mission is to conduct guerrilla operations against the Viet Minh in rear supply areas, far from French-controlled zones.

Over more than three years, the battalion conducts a successful but brutal guerrilla campaign against the Viet Minh across northern Indochina, Laos, and southern China. In one incident, the battalion escorts a supply column through enemy territory by forcing Viet Minh prisoners and their families to ride on the vehicles to ensure safe passage. Poison, torture, and environmental warfare are also employed.

A publisher's note in the 1985 edition states: "This book is being published to provide the reading public with a clear insight into the mind and personality of an unregenerate Nazi, to show the dehumanization of men in war, and to illustrate the ironies and hypocrisies to which men are driven in defense of their actions. The publication of this book in no way indicates that the publisher agrees with or condones the points of view it expresses."

== Publication history ==
Devil's Guard was first issued as a hardcover by Delacorte Press in 1971. It was later released as a mass-market paperback by New English Library in the United Kingdom in 1972, with several reprints. In the United States, the paperback was not published by Dell but by various other houses. In the mid-2000s, Hailer Publishing (St. Petersburg, Florida) reprinted all three books in the series. A new edition with an introduction by a military historian was reportedly planned but never materialized.

== Historicity and controversy ==
Scholars and critics have debated whether Devil's Guard is an exaggerated memoir or outright fiction. Elford presents the book as the verbatim account of Wagemueller, whom he claims to have met in Nepal, where the former officer dictated his story over eighteen days. Elford states that he only edited the text, changing names and military terminology to protect identities.

It is historically documented that former SS soldiers did join the French Foreign Legion and fought in Indochina, particularly until about 1947 when France began stricter vetting. However, no evidence supports the existence of an all-German battalion-sized unit as described in the book.

Critics point to anachronisms in the weapons and tactics used, and note that the unit designation—"21st special partisan-jaeger commando"—appears in no known military records. Elford's response has been that he honored Wagemueller's request to obscure traceable details.

The book mentions Freddie Spencer Chapman's The Jungle is Neutral, about Force 136 operations in Malaya, as a source of inspiration for guerrilla tactics. Some tactics described, such as wearing Viet Minh uniforms to infiltrate camps, are also attributed to French commando Roger Vanderberghe, commander of GCMA Commando 24.

== Reception ==
Critical reception has been mixed. While some readers appreciate the action and adventure, historians have dismissed it as unreliable. John Sutherland of The Telegraph noted that the book's serialization—with sequels that follow Wagemueller to Tibet and then fighting for the United States—undermines its claim to authenticity. The book has been described as "a guilty pleasure" for military fiction fans, but its value as a historical document is negligible.

Despite the controversy, the book found a readership among soldiers, as evidenced by its popularity in the Iraq War era.

== Devil's Guard series ==
The series consists of three volumes:

- Devil's Guard (1971) – ISBN 0-440-12014-4 (1985 paperback reprint by Dell)
- Devil's Guard II: Recall to Inferno (1988)
- Devil's Guard III: Unconditional Warfare (1991)

All three were reprinted by Hailer Publishing in the mid-2000s. No new volumes have been released since.

== See also ==
- French Foreign Legion
- First Indochina War
- Waffen-SS in popular culture
