= Kurt Knispel =

German World War II tank gunner

- Born: 20 September 1921; Salisfeld, Czechoslovakia
- Died: 28 April 1945 (aged 23); Urbau, German occupied Czechoslovakia
- Military career
- Allegiance: Nazi Germany
- Branch: German Army
- Service years: 1940–1945
- Rank: Feldwebel
- Units: 12th Panzer Division; 503rd Heavy Panzer Battalion
- Conflicts: World War II
- Awards: German Cross in Gold; Iron Cross First & Second Class

Kurt Knispel (20 September 1921 – 28 April 1945) was a German tank commander during World War II. Knispel was severely wounded on 28 April 1945 by shrapnel to his head when his Tiger II was hit in battle by Soviet tanks. He died two hours later in a German field hospital.

On 10 April 2013, Czech authorities said that Knispel's remains were found with 15 other German soldiers behind a church wall in Vrbovec, identified by his dog tags. On 12 November 2014, the German War Graves Commission reburied his remains at the Central Brno military cemetery in Brno. He was buried with 41 other German soldiers who died in Moravia and Silesia.

== Controversial Claims in the Media ==
Post war popular literature and enthusiast literature often portray Knispel as a leading German “tank ace,” sometimes crediting him with as many as 168 destroyed enemy tanks, on the basis of clean Wehrmacht mythology. Modern studies of the “Panzer ace” phenomenon treat such tallies, including those attributed to figures like Michael Wittmann and Otto Carius with considerable caution, noting that individual kill claims from German sources are difficult to verify and were often inflated in post‑war narratives. Alfred Rubbel, serving in the unit explained that the exact number of Knispel's tank kills could not be confirmed because the battalion did not use to count destroyed tanks or ascribe them to an individual gunner or tank commander.

Knispel's supposed "126 confirmed kills" were extensively portrayed in the second installment (book) of the popular historical fiction series Panzer Aces written by Franz Kurowski. But according to Knispel's superior officer in 503rd Heavy Panzer Battalion when he was a commander, Alfred Rubbel "one of Kurowski's numerous fabrications is the claim that Knispel was nominated four times (unsuccessfully) for the Knight's Cross of the Iron Cross." Rubbel said idiomatically "The book is a sheer imprudence. What's in there, he sucked out of his thumb. What the quotes he puts in my mouth alone! That can't be right."

Rubbel, who is cited as a witness for many of the claims made in Kurowski’s book, states in his overall assessment: “The reason Kurowski keeps portraying me as a ‘key witness’ may be that he doesn’t take facts very seriously”. According to Rubbel, Knispel was initially assigned as a radio operator, which makes the claimed first tank kills in 1941 implausible.

== Awards ==
- German Cross in Gold on 20 May 1944 as Unteroffizier in the 1./schwere Panzer-Abteilung 503
