= Schiffer Publishing =

American nonfiction publisher

- Founded: 1974
- Founders: Peter and Nancy Schiffer
- Country of origin: United States
- Headquarters location: Atglen, Pennsylvania USA
- Publication types: Books
- Nonfiction topics: Antiques, architecture and design, arts and crafts, collectibles, lifestyle, military history, militaria
- Official website: schifferbooks.com

Schiffer Publishing Ltd. (also known for its imprints Schiffer, Schiffer Craft, Schiffer Military History, Schiffer Kids, REDFeather MBS, Cornell Maritime Press, Tidewater Publishers, Thrums Books, and Geared Up Publications) is a family-owned publisher of nonfiction books. Founded in 1974 and based in Atglen, Pennsylvania, its coverage includes antiques, architecture and design, arts and crafts, collectibles, lifestyle, children's books, regional, military history, militaria, tarot and oracle, and mind, body, and spirit.

In 2009, Schiffer Publishing acquired Cornell Maritime Press/Tidewater Publishers. In October 2020 Schiffer Publishing announced their purchase of Thrums Books which specializes in telling the stories of indigenous craft traditions from around the world. Its illustrated titles have featured artisans in Peru, Guatemala, Mexico, Morocco, Afghanistan, China and more.

== Reception of war literature ==
Schiffer Publishing has been described by American historians Ronald Smelser and Edward J. Davies in their 2006 work The Myth of the Eastern Front as one of the leading publishers of war romancing literature, second in North America only to the Canadian publisher J.J. Fedorowicz. According to Smelser and Davies, Schiffer provides a platform for authors who present an uncritical and ahistorical portrayal of the German war effort during the Soviet-German war of 1941–1945.

Schiffer has a strong focus on the German side of the conflict, with 204 titles in its 1996 military history catalogue being dedicated to the German war effort, out of a total of 234 titles. The catalogue described one of Schiffer's titles as the story of "the great aces" who "could not win, yet they fought to the final hour in an unforgettable combat saga".
