= Ace (military) =

Warrior distinguished by quantifiable achievements

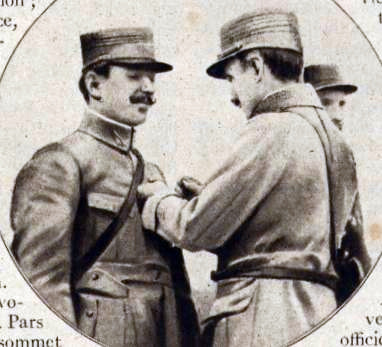
The "first French ace", Frenchman Adolphe Pégoud being awarded the Croix de guerre. The term "ace" in relation to individual military success originated with French military propaganda of World War I.

Ace, when used in the context of military propaganda, denotes a successful military professional who has accumulated a meaningfully measurable statistic such as aircraft shot down, tanks destroyed, tonnage sunk, or a number of successful sniper shots. In a manner analogous to sport statistics, some military roles can be measured in terms of a quantifiable metric. Once said metric is established, military personnel (whether within the same force, in different forces, or in different eras) may be quantified versus the designated metric and compared in a tabular fashion. Such metrics may be used as a basis for military merit awards, such as Knight's Cross of the Iron Cross by setting an arbitrary threshold. Likewise, a designation of "ace" ("double ace", "triple ace", etc.) may be applied, such as 5 aircraft shot down.

The ace achieved success with "skill and luck, and if victorious won the accolades of the patriotic public". The usage of the term in popular culture evolved to include "tank aces" ("Panzer aces") and "submarine aces".

== Flying aces ==
The term is most commonly applied to military aviators, especially fighter pilots, who are often described as "flying aces". The term "ace" in relation to individual military success originated with French military propaganda of World War I. The as de l'aviation (the flying ace) was used for fighter pilots who had shot down a certain number of enemy aircraft, usually five or more. It has been picked up particularly by the United States Army Air Service and its propaganda.

The emergence of the solo "flying ace" can be traced to the introduction of the single-seater fighter airplane in 1915. The image created by the state propaganda was that of "chevalier of the skies", the successor of the medieval knight at a joust. According to Nicole-Melanie Goll, the popular perception of one-on-one duels was divorced from reality, however, as planes rarely broke formation.

The ace was supposed to be in control of his destiny, and could only be defeated by an equally skillful opponent. Hence, being shot down by ground anti-aircraft fire was considered to be a dishonour. According to historian Peter Fritzsche:

The ace in combat is an immediately recognizable image. In control of his fate, handling his airplane with great courage and skill but also with an envied recklessness, the aviator appeared to be a genuine war hero, comparable to cavalrymen in Napoleon's era or chivalrous knights in the Middle Ages. [...] To this day, myths opposing the individual, distinctive combat of the aces to the industrial mass war on the ground remain deeply embedded in Western folklore.

== Other "aces" ==
The term "tank ace" is occasionally applied to tank crew. For instance, Sydney Radley-Walters' obituary published in The Globe and Mail in 2015 described him as the "best Canadian front-line tank ace" of World War II. Robert Kershaw in his book "Tank Men" refers to a "Tank Ace" being the minority of tank commanders that accounted for the most destroyed enemy armour, saying it is roughly analogous with flying ace. Soviet tankers with over five kills, such as Dmitry Lavrinenko and Zinovy Kolobanov, have also been referred to as "tank aces".

Many German U-boat commanders of World War II, especially Gunther Prien, Otto Kretschmer and Wolfgang Lüth, have been popularised in German war-time propaganda and popular literature. According to historian Michael L. Hadley,

Literature of World War II heightened the features that earlier cults of the hero [of the German U-boat arm] had promoted. This was the era of the "grey wolves" and "steel sharks", when wolf packs, officially designated by such predatory names "robber baron" and "bludgeon", attacked the Allies' convoys. Widespread popularization of the U-boat aces, of their images and deeds propagated the cult of the personality which even today finds resonance in the popular market.

Due to the individual nature of sniping and the possibility to record the number of successful shots due to the relatively small number of shots taken and due to the target being under observation through the shot, compiling statistics regarding sniper success is possible (List of snipers). Recognition of snipers by production was particularly done in the Eastern Front (World War II) and was used for war-time propaganda and remained relevant in popular culture after the war, and has continued to remain culturally relevant also in post-2000 conflicts.

== See also ==
- Panzer Aces and Infantry Aces, a book series by Franz Kurowski
- Waffen-SS in popular culture
