= Jacques de Mahieu =

Spanish neo-Nazi leader and writer

Jacques de Mahieu, whose real name was Jacques Girault (31 October 1915 – 4 October 1990), was a French Argentine anthropologist and Peronist. He wrote several books on esoterism, which he mixed with anthropological theories inspired by scientific racism.

He joined the Action Française at a young age. A collaborationist in Vichy France and member of the Waffen-SS, he fled to Argentina after the liberation of France from the Nazis. He became a Peronist ideologue in the 1950s, mentor to a Roman Catholic nationalist youth group in the 1960s, and later in life, head of the Argentine chapter of Spanish neo-Nazi group CEDADE.

== Biography ==
=== Early life and World War II ===
He was born in Marseille, France. As a young man he was influenced by authors such as Georges Sorel, Charles Maurras, and Alexis Carrel and joined the Action Française.

During World War II, he was a member of the 33rd Waffen Grenadier Division of the SS Charlemagne.

After the liberation of France, he was one of the first to flee to Juan Perón's Argentina through the ratlines organized by Perón. A naturalized Argentine, he became an ideologue of the Peronist movement, before becoming a mentor to a Roman Catholic nationalist youth group in the 1960s.

=== Academic career ===
De Mahieu studied at the Universities of Mendoza and Buenos Aires; he graduated in philosophy, as doctor Honoris Causa of Medicine, doctor in economic sciences, and doctor in political science.

He became a professor of anthropological studies in Buenos Aires as the deputy rector of the Institute of Human Studies (from 1953 to 1955 and again from 1972 to 1976). He also taught economy, ethnography and French at the National University of Cuyo (1948–1955), and at the Universidad del Salvador (1964–1965).

He also was a member of the Academia Argentina de Sociología (1952–1955), and a lecturer with the Armed Forces of the Argentine Republic (1961–1971).

=== Later life and death ===
De Mahieu remained in Argentina in his later years. Uki Goñi claims that he was photographed with Carlos Menem during the latter's 1989 presidential campaign. De Mahieu headed the Argentine chapter of the Spanish neo-Nazi group, CEDADE, until his death in Buenos Aires, in 1990.

== Pre-Columbian contact theories ==
De Mahieu wrote on pre-Columbian America and esoteric Nazism. He traveled to Paraguay for anthropological studies, and claimed the Guayaki tribes were descendants of the Vikings. He allegedly travelled to Brazil in 1974, where he visited the Sete Cidades park in Piauí and considered it a Viking establishment. His books on the Knights Templar allege they settled in Mexico before Columbus.

His books were translated from French to German by Wilfred von Oven, formerly deputy to the Nazi propagandist Joseph Goebbels.

== Economics and politics ==
Mahieu wrote a book titled The Communal Economy (1964), which was inspired by a social and economic project developed in Mendoza, Argentina. The project ended during the Revolución Libertadora regime, which toppled Juan Perón's government in 1955.

== Bibliography ==
=== In English ===
- Foundations of Biopolitics: Race. Ethno-genopolitics. Population Volume. Migrations, Cariou Publishing, 2023

=== In Spanish ===
- Europa y el nacionalsocialismo: desde el tratado de Versalles, video
- La inteligencia organizadora, Editorial San Luis, 1950
- Filosofía de la estética, Universidad Nacional de Cuyo, 1950
- Evolución y porvenir del sindicalismo, Arayú, 1954
- La economía comunitaria, Universidad Argentina de Ciencias Sociales, 1964
- Diccionario de ciencia política, Books International, 1966
- Proletariado y cultura, Marú, 1967
- Fundamentos de biopolítica, Centro Editor Argentino, 1968
- Maurras y Sorel, Centro Editor Argentino, 1969
- Tratado de sociología general, Centro Editor Argentino, 1969
- El estado comunitario, La Bastilla (2nd edition), 1973
- El gran viaje del Dios-sol, Hachette, 1976
- La agonía del dios Sol, Hachette, 1977
- La geografía secreta de América, Hachette, 1978
- El rey vikingo del Paraguay, Hachette, 1979
- La naturaleza del cosmos, Retorno, 2008

=== In French ===
- Précis de biopolitique, Éditions celtiques, 1969
- Le Grand voyage du dieu-soleil, Édition spéciale, 1971
- L'Agonie du Dieu Soleil. Les Vikings en Amérique du Sud, Robert Laffont, 1974
- Drakkars sur l'Amazone, Copernic, 1977
- L'Imposture de Christophe Colomb. La Géographie Secrète de l'Amérique, Copernic, 1979
- La Fabuleuse Épopée des Troyens en Amérique du Sud, Pardès, 1998
- Les Templiers en Amérique, J'ai lu, 1999
- Maurras et Sorel, Cariou Publishing, 2024

=== In German ===
- Des Sonnengottes große Reise – Die Wikinger in Mexiko und Peru, Grabert Verlag, 1972
- Des Sonnengottes Todeskampf – Die Wikinger in Paraguay, Grabert Verlag, 1973
- Des Sonnengottes heilige Steine – Die Wikinger in Brasilien, Grabert Verlag, 1975
- Wer entdeckte Amerika? – Geheimgeographie vor Kolumbus, Grabert Verlag, 1977
- Der weiße König von Ipir, Grabert Verlag, 1978
- Die Templer in Amerika oder das Silber der Kathedralen, Grabert Verlag, 1979
- Das Wikingerreich von Tiahuanacu – Geschichte eines nordischen Imperiums in Südamerika, Grabert Verlag, 1981
- Die Erben Trojas, Grabert Verlag, 1982
- Die Flucht der Trojaner: Wie ihre Hochkultur über Nordafrika und die Kanarischen Inseln nach Amerika gelangte, Grabert Verlag, 1985
- Volk – Nation – Rasse. Grundlagen der Biopolitik, DS-Verlag, 2003
