= Der Landser =

German fiction magazine

- Der Landser work by Franz Kurowski. His narratives in this series appeared under his own name and under pseudonyms Karl Kollatz and Karl Alman.
- Editor: Bertold K. Jochim
- Authors: Paul Carell; Günther Fraschka; Franz Kurowski
- Language: German
- Genre: War story—fiction
- Publisher: Pabel Moewig, a subsidiary of Bauer Media Group
- Publication date: 1954 to 2013
- Publication place: West Germany
- Media type: Print
- OCLC: 313406814

Der Landser (literally private, common soldier) was a West German pulp magazine published by Pabel-Moewig and featuring mostly stories in World War II settings. The magazine was founded in 1954 by writer and former Luftwaffe officer Bertold K. Jochim (1921–2002), who worked as its editor-in-chief until 1999. In September 2013 the Bauer Media Group, its last owner, ceased publishing the magazine.

== History ==
The magazine asserted that its war stories were true and that their underlying message was one of peace. In fact many of their stories came with disclaimer reminding the reader of the horrors of war. Critics, however, dismissed such claims as pure lip service to avoid getting indexed by West Germany's Federal Department for Media Harmful to Young Persons which started to index several of their editions in the 1950s.

The publisher of the magazine was Pabel Moewig, a subsidiary of Bauer Media Group. In September 2013, Bauer Media Group said it would cease publication of Der Landser following complaints from the Simon Wiesenthal Center. The magazine was closed down on 13 September 2013.

== Criticism ==
From its founding, the magazine was criticized for glorifying war and delivering a distorted image of the Wehrmacht and Nazi Germany during World War II. The content of novels was accurate regarding minor technical details, but its descriptions were often not authentic and withheld important contextual information from the reader. Antisemitism, German war crimes, the repressive nature of the German government, and the causes of the war were not mentioned. Germany's leading news magazine Der Spiegel described Der Landser once as the expert journal for the whitewashing of the Wehrmacht ("Fachorgan für die Verklärung der Wehrmacht").

== Authors ==
- Franz Kurowski
- Paul Carell
- Günther Fraschka

== See also ==
- Waffen-SS in popular culture
- Militaria literature
