= List of German far-right publishers (post-1945) =

This is a list of German far-right publishers (post-1945). In post-World War II Germany, after the defeat of the Nazis and Nazi Germany, the far-right was outlawed by the Allied occupation forces, preventing political continuity of the Nazi Party in a new, post-war form. In West Germany, reformed far-right parties were able to reestablish a foot hold in the national parliament in the early years of the new Federal Republic, courtesy in part to the post-war issues the new country faced. With the recovery of the German economy, the Wirtschaftswunder, the far-right declined in appeal. The far-right, from the 1960s, was characterised by fragmentation and infighting. Following the German reunification, in the early 1990s, the far-right has regained strength and become more of a threat to the democratic Germany again.

In East Germany, a communist country, the far-right was declared extinct by the government despite the fact that a quarter of all members of the ruling communist party, in 1954, had formerly been members of the Nazi Party. Despite the official line, racism and far-right ideology existed and, towards the end of the country's existence in the late 1980s, increased. It was however swept under the carpet by the ruling authorities as ordinary violence and hooliganism rather than being allowed to be seen as a resurface of far-right ideology.

The German Federal Office for the Protection of the Constitution classifies the far-right (German: Rechtsextremismus) as a movement against the equality of all people as guaranteed by the German constitution, and as enemies of the democratic nature of the German state. Their aim is to establish an authoritarian state, modelled on the Führerprinzip. The far-right places undue value on race and ethnicity which results in xenophobia and racism. Antisemitism is a core principal of their ideology. Far-right publications generally glorify Germany's Nazi past and the armed forces of the era, the Wehrmacht and Waffen-SS, offering historically revisionist publications and attempting to promote the myth of the "Clean Wehrmacht" and "Clean Waffen-SS". Far-right publishers are however careful to not out-rightly deny or trivialise the Holocaust as this is a criminal offence in Germany, and many have been prosecuted for such offences in the past.

The German Federal Office for the Protection of the Constitution, as of 2017, classifies three political parties as far-right, the National Democratic Party of Germany (NPD), Die Rechte and Der III. Weg, with a combined membership of 6,050.

The far-right print media in Germany is predominantly organised in the Gesellschaft für freie Publizistik, GfP, the largest far-right association of publishers, authors and book sellers, which was formed by former SS officers and Nazi officials in 1960. The number of far-right publishers in Germany independent of political parties has declined from 45 in 2001 to 30 in 2016.

== Far-right publishers ==
Major far-right publishers:

Name	Location	Est	Dis	Key people	Notes	Ref
Adoria-Verlag	Oberhausen			Dankwart Strauch (also involved in the Winkelried-Verlag)	Mainly publishes World War II related material about the Wehrmacht and Waffen-SS	
Arndt Verlag	Kiel	1963	Active	Dietmar Munier (formerly an official in the NPD)	see Verlagsgruppe Lesen & Schenken	
Bonus-Verlag	Selent				see Verlagsgruppe Lesen & Schenken	
Deutsche Stimme Verlag	Riesa	1976	Active		Owned by the NPD, historically commercially successful but has declined in recent years Publisher of the Deutsche Stimme	
Druckschriften-und Zeitungsverlag	Munich	1958	Active	Gerhard Frey Regine Frey since his death in 2013	Publisher of Germany's longest-running far-right newspaper, the National Zeitung	
Druffel-Verlag		1952	1991	Helmut Sündermann (former Secretary of state in the Reich Ministry of Public Enlightenment and Propaganda)	Druffel-Verlag, together with Türmer-Verlag and Vowinckel-Verlag, formed the Verlagsgesellschaft Berg in 1991	
Edition Zeitgeschichte					see Verlagsgruppe Lesen & Schenken	
Grabert Verlag	Tübingen	1953	2013	Herbert Grabert (former high ranking Nazi official)	Originally formed as the Verlag der deutschen Hochschullehrerzeitung, renamed in 1974 Taken over by the Hohenrain Verlag GmbH in 2013 Grabert was one of the oldest and most important far-right independent publishers in Germany	
Hohenrain Verlag	Tübingen	1985	Active	Grabert family	Formed as an offshoot of the Grabert Verlag in 1985 which it took over in 2013 Revisionist and Holocaust-questioning publications Publisher of the Euro-Kurier and Deutschland in Geschichte und Gegenwart	
Junge Freiheit Verlag	Berlin	1990	Active	Dieter Stein	Part of the Neue Rechte Publisher of the Junge Freiheit	
Kopp Verlag	Rottenburg	1993	Active	Jochen Kopp	Mainly publishes books dealing with conspiracy theories, propagates a racist world view, commercially one of the most successful far-right publishers	
Landwehr-Verlag					see Verlagsgruppe Lesen & Schenken	
Nation Europa Verlag	Coburg	1951	2010	Formed by Arthur Ehrhardt (former SS-Sturmbannführer and chief of the Bandenbekämpfung at the Führer Headquarters)	Best known for its publication Nation & Europa Taken over by the Arndt-Verlag in 2010	
Orion-Heimreiter-Verlag		1983		Ernst Frank (Brother of Karl Hermann Frank, a high-ranking Nazi official in the Protectorate of Bohemia and Moravia)	see Verlagsgruppe Lesen & Schenken	
Pour le Mérite-Verlag					see Verlagsgruppe Lesen & Schenken	
Schild-Verlag	Zweibrücken	1949	2004		Taken over by the VDM Heinz Nickel in 2004	
Türmer-Verlag					see Verlagsgesellschaft Berg	
VDM Heinz Nickel	Zweibrücken	1986	Active	Heinz Nickel	Publisher of historical revisionist books about World War II Took over the Schild-Verlag in 2004	
Verlag Antaios	Steigra	2000	Active	Götz Kubitschek	One of the most important publishers of the New Right in Germany	
Verlag Bublies	Beltheim	1979				
Verlag Hohe Warte	Pähl				Operated by the xenophobic and antisemitic Bundes für Gotterkenntnis (Ludendorff) e.V., named after Mathilde Ludendorff, dubbed the Great-Grandmother of German antisemitism Publisher of Mensch und Maß	
Verlagsgesellschaft Berg	Gilching	1991	Active	Gert Sudholt (executive director, had previously been found guilty of Volksverhetzung (Incitement to hatred) and jailed, also leader the GfP for many years)	Merger of the publishers Druffel-Verlag, Türmer-Verlag and Vowinckel-Verlag One of the largest independent far-right publishers in Germany, manly publishing revisionist historical material Publisher of Deutsche Geschichte and Deutsche Annalen	
Verlagsgruppe Lesen & Schenken	Martensrade		Active	Dietmar Munier (formerly an official in the NPD)	One of the largest far-right publishers in Germany The group consists of the following publishers: Arndt Verlag; Bonus-Verlag; Edition Zeitgeschichte; Landwehr-Verlag; Orion-Heimreiter-Verlag; Pour le Mérite-Verlag; Publications: Deutsche Militärzeitschrift (DMZ); Deutsche Militärzeitschrift – Zeitgeschichte (DMZ – Zeitgeschichte); Zuerst!; Production company: Excelsior; It mainly publishes revisionist material that glorifies the Wehrmacht and Waffen-SS	
Vowinckel-Verlag					see Verlagsgesellschaft Berg	
Winkelried-Verlag	Leisnig		Active	Dankwart Strauch (Owner since 2014, is also involved in the Adoria-Verlag)	Formed as the Buchdienst Kaden, predominantly publishes material glorifying the Nazi era and Waffen-SS, publishing books by, among others, David Irving and Erich Ludendorff	
