= Paul Carell =

Writer and Nazi propagandist (1911–1997)

- Born: 2 November 1911; Kelbra, German Empire
- Died: 20 June 1997 (aged 85); Rottach-Egern, Germany
- Occupations: Writer; journalist; propagandist
- Employer: Allgemeine-SS
- Political party: Nazi Party

Paul Carell was the post-war pen name of Paul Karl Schmidt (2 November 1911 – 20 June 1997), who was a writer and German propagandist. During the Nazi era, Schmidt served as the chief press spokesman for Joachim von Ribbentrop's Foreign Ministry. In this capacity during World War II, he maintained close ties with the Wehrmacht while serving in the Allgemeine-SS (General SS). One of his specialities was the "Jewish question". After the war, Carell became a successful author, mostly of revisionist books that romanticized and whitewashed the Wehrmacht.

== Career before and during World War II ==
Born in Kelbra, Paul Karl Schmidt became a member of the Nazi Party in 1931 and a member of the SS in 1938. He graduated from university in 1934 and became an assistant at the Institute of Psychology of the University of Kiel in Germany. He held several positions in the Nazi Student Association.

In the SS, Schmidt was promoted to the rank of Obersturmbannführer in 1940. During the same year, he became the chief press spokesman for the foreign minister Joachim von Ribbentrop. In this position, he was responsible for the German Foreign Ministry's news and press division.

Schmidt chaired the daily press conferences of the ministry and was thus one of the most important and influential propagandists for Nazism during World War II. Recent studies confirm that his influence was at least on the same level as that of Otto Dietrich (Reichspressechef of Adolf Hitler) and of Hans Fritzsche (Pressechef of the Reichspropagandaministerium). Schmidt was also responsible for the German propaganda magazine Signal, which was published in several languages to tell the German side of the story in neutral and occupied countries during the war.

Schmidt justified the Holocaust through his propaganda efforts. In May 1944, he advised on how to justify the deportation and murder of Hungarian Jews, to counter the potential accusation of mass murder:

The planned undertaking (against the Jews of Budapest) will create significant attention and lead to a strong reaction because of its scope. Those who are against us will scream and talk of a hunt on humans, and will try to use terror propaganda to increase feelings against us in neutral states. I would therefore like to suggest that it would not be possible to prevent these things by creating reasons and events justifying the undertaking, e.g. finding explosives in Jewish association buildings and Synagogues, plans for sabotage attacks, for a coup d’etat, attacks on policemen, and smuggling of currency in significant amounts to destroy the fabric of the Hungarian currency. The final piece of this should be a particularly heinous case, which can then be used to justify the dragnet.

Schmidt was arrested on 6 May 1945 and interned for 30 months. It was left open for a long time whether he would appear as one of those indicted or as a witness for the prosecution during the war crimes trials. During the Ministries Trial, part of the Nuremberg Trials, he finally appeared as a witness for the prosecution, and portrayed himself as a fighter for democratic freedom of the press.

== Post-war ==
After World War II, Schmidt became a writer. Aided by the network of 'old comrades' working in the publishing industry, he was able to secure assignments. Starting in the 1950s, he wrote for the popular magazine Kristall. He first used the pseudonym Paul Karell, and later Paul Carell. Carell was a member of the Naumann Circle, a group of Neo-Nazis who sought to infiltrate the Free Democratic Party.

He worked as a freelance author under various noms de plume for newspapers such as Die Welt and Die Zeit (as P. C. Holm, among others). He also wrote for the magazines Norddeutsche Rundschau and Der Spiegel, and published some accounts of war stories for Der Landser, a West German pulp magazine featuring stories predominantly set during World War II. He was seen as an influential adviser to the German Axel Springer AG, where he wrote speeches for Axel Springer.

From 1965 to 1971, the Office of the State Prosecutor of Verden in Germany investigated him for murder. But the investigation, which should have clarified his role in the genocide of Hungarian Jews, ended without an indictment. Schmidt never had to face a trial for his activities during the war.

In 1992, Carell claimed that even after the Battle of Stalingrad, there was a possibility for Germany to win the war. In his view, it was primarily the command of Adolf Hitler that led to the defeat. The leadership of the Wehrmacht and very competent commanders such as Erich von Manstein could have achieved victory if not for Hitler's interference. Carell also claimed that the invasion of the Soviet Union was a preemptive attack to forestall an invasion of Germany by the Red Army.

== Writing career ==
The success of his books Hitler Moves East (Unternehmen Barbarossa) and Scorched Earth (Verbrannte Erde) made Carell a leading post-war chronicler of the German side of World War II on the Eastern Front. His book Die Gefangenen (1980), dealing with German prisoners of war in the Soviet Union, was published by Ullstein-Verlag. These books generally had a positive media reception; Die Welt wrote, for example: "Helps to reduce the dislike between Germans and Russians (...) qualified as a historian." Or the Düsseldorfer Mittag: "Someone for whom the seriousness of the source and the value of documentation are more important than going for cheap thrills – that is Paul Carell!" Carell also wrote about Rommel and about the Allied invasion of Normandy.

In his books, Carell portrays the Wehrmacht as heroes fighting for a lost cause. Carell presents a post-war revisionist message, first popularized by leading Wehrmacht generals:

- The German soldier fought a clean war imposed on him by an evil dictator (there is no mention of the war of aggression and annihilation, which the war in the East really was).
- The Waffen-SS appear as soldiers just like all the rest.
- In the end, the overwhelming material and human resources of the enemy defeat the Germans.

Carell's works emphasize the German army's professionalism, sacrifice and positive encounters with civilians. His books also suggest that the Wehrmacht freed the Russians from their Communist tyrants and restored their religious community.

In Carell's works, the army thus operated in a world distinct from the political sphere, and the culprits for any calamities that befell the Russian people ruled this political sphere, namely the Nazi and the Communist parties. The thrust of this argument thus confirmed the high moral position of the German officer, perpetuating the myth of the "clean Wehrmacht". Carell's themes of anti-Communism also appealed to the U.S. public and garnered Carell repeat reprints.

== Bibliography ==
- Stalingrad: The Defeat of the German 6th Army. Atglen, PA: Schiffer Military History, 1993 ISBN 0-88740-469-3
- Hitler's War on Russia, volume 2 Scorched Earth. London: Harrap, 1970 ISBN 0-88740-598-3
- Hitler Moves East: 1941-1943. New York: Little, Brown, 1964 ISBN 0-921991-11-8
- Invasion! They're Coming!. New York: Dutton, 1963 ISBN 0-88740-716-1
- Foxes of the Desert. New York: Bantam, 1960 ISBN 0-88740-659-9
