= Rudolf Lehmann (SS officer) =

Waffen-SS commander (1914–1983)

- Born: 30 January 1914; Heidelberg, German Empire
- Died: 17 September 1983 (aged 69); Ettlingen, Baden-Württemberg, West Germany
- Military career
- Allegiance: Nazi Germany
- Branch: Waffen SS
- Rank: SS-Standartenführer
- Units: SS Division Leibstandarte; 1st SS Panzer Corps
- Commands: SS Division Das Reich
- Conflicts: World War II
- Awards: Knight's Cross of the Iron Cross

Rudolf Lehmann (30 January 1914 – 17 September 1983) was a mid-ranking commander the Waffen-SS of Nazi Germany during World War II. He was a recipient of the Knight's Cross of the Iron Cross. Following the war, Lehmann authored a unit history of SS Division Leibstandarte published in German by HIAG, the post-war Waffen-SS lobby group, and in English by J.J. Fedorowicz Publishing.

== Career ==
Born in 1914, Lehmann joined the Waffen-SS in April 1935. He was then posted to the Germania regiment of the SS, which later became SS Division Das Reich, and then to the Leibstandarte SS Adolf Hitler in October 1940. In late 1944, Lehmann moved to the 1st SS Panzer Corps as chief of staff. He remained in this position until March 1945, when he was made divisional commander of the SS Division Das Reich. He led the division through Operation Spring Awakening, the battles around Lake Balaton and Vienna.

After the war, Lehmann authored volumes I, II and III of the unit history of the Leibstandarte produced under the auspices of HIAG, a lobby group and a revisionist veteran's organisation established by former high-ranking Waffen-SS personnel. The works were published in 1977–82 by the right-wing publishing house Munin-Verlag. Lehmann died in 1983.

== Awards ==
- Iron Cross (1939) 2nd Class (15 November 1939) & 1st Class (29 May 1940)
- German Cross in Gold on 1 November 1943 as SS-Sturmbannführer in the SS Division Leibstandarte
- Knight's Cross of the Iron Cross with Oak Leaves
  - Knights Cross on 23 February 1944 as SS-Obersturmbannführer and Ia (operations officer) of the SS Division Leibstandarte

Lehmann was nominated for Oak Leaves towards the end of the war. No credible evidence of the award can be found in the German Federal Archives. The Oak Leaves award was unlawfully presented by Sepp Dietrich on 6 May 1945, which was announced by the 6th Panzer Army.

Military offices
Preceded by SS-Gruppenführer Werner Ostendorff	Commander of 2nd SS Division Das Reich; 9 March 1945 – 13 April 1945	Succeeded by SS-Standartenführer Karl Kreutz
