= Waffen-SS historical negationism =

Uncritical portrayal of the Nazi combat organisation

The Waffen-SS, the combat branch of the paramilitary SS organisation of Nazi Germany, is sometimes portrayed uncritically or admiringly in popular culture.

The activities of HIAG, a German lobby group founded by former high-ranking Waffen-SS officers in 1951, have shaped much of this portrayal. HIAG leaders—Paul Hausser, Felix Steiner, and Kurt Meyer—directed a campaign to promote public perception of the force as elite, apolitical fighters who were not involved in the crimes of the Nazi regime. Although historians have since discredited these notions, the uncritical, often admiring, tradition continues to the present through popular-history books, websites and wargames. It appears in the works of Franz Kurowski (1923–2011), Bruce Quarrie (1947–2004), Gordon Williamson (1951–), and Mark C. Yerger (1955–2016), among others.

== Background ==
The Waffen-SS ("Armed SS") was the combat wing of the Nazi Party's SS organisation. Its formations included men from Nazi Germany, along with volunteers and conscripts from both occupied and un-occupied European countries. The Waffen-SS grew from three regiments to over 38 divisions during World War II, with approximately 900,000 personnel going through its ranks. The Waffen-SS units served alongside the German Army (Heer), Ordnungspolizei (uniformed police) and other security units of the Reich Security Main Office (RSHA).

The functions of the Waffen-SS spanned combat operations on the front lines, internal security duties in occupied Europe, and the implementation of the Nazi regime's genocidal racial policies. According to Modern Genocide: The Definitive Resource and Document Collection, the Waffen-SS had played a "paramount role" in the ideological war of extermination (Vernichtungskrieg), and not just as frontline or rear area security formations: a third of the Einsatzgruppen (mobile killing squads) personnel who were responsible for mass murder, especially of Jews, had been recruited from Waffen-SS personnel prior to the invasion of the Soviet Union.

During the Nuremberg trials, the defenders of the Waffen-SS, including former SS general Paul Hausser, claimed that it was a purely military organisation no different from the Wehrmacht. The prosecution at Nuremberg rejected that assertion and successfully argued that the Waffen-SS was an integral part of the SS apparatus. The tribunal found that "the units of the Waffen-SS were directly involved in the killings of the prisoners of war and the atrocities in the occupied countries" and judged the entire SS to be a criminal organisation.

== Foundation ==
=== Post-war Waffen-SS lobby group (HIAG) ===
HIAG, a lobby group and a revisionist veteran's organisation founded by former high-ranking Waffen-SS personnel in West Germany in 1951, laid the foundation for the post-war interpretation of the Waffen-SS in popular culture. The organisation campaigned for the legal, economic and historical rehabilitation of the Waffen-SS, using contacts with political parties to manipulate them for its purposes. Restoring the "tarnished shield" (Note: See the chapter "Tarnished Shield: Waffen-SS Criminality" in The Waffen SS: Hitler's Elite Guard at War, 1939–1945 (1966) by George H. Stein) was viewed by the leadership as a key component of the desired legal and economic rehabilitation, and thus no effort was spared.

HIAG aimed to reverse the Nuremberg judgement through significant propaganda efforts in the service of its historical revisionism. (Note: According to Large, HIAG attempted "to manipulate historical record or simply to ignore it".) HIAG's rewriting of history encompassed multi-prong publicity campaigns, including tendentious periodicals, books and public speeches, along with a publishing house dedicated to presenting the Waffen-SS in a positive light. This extensive body of work—57 books and more than 50 years of monthly periodicals—have been described by historians as revisionist apologia.

Always in touch with its Nazi past, HIAG was a subject of significant controversy, both in West Germany and abroad. The organisation drifted into right-wing extremism in its later history; it was disbanded in 1992 at the federal level, but local groups, along with the organisation's monthly periodical, continued to exist at least through the 2000s, possibly into the 2010s. While HIAG only partially achieved its goals of legal and economic rehabilitation of the Waffen-SS, its propaganda efforts led to the reshaping of the image of the Waffen-SS in popular culture. The results are still felt, with scholarly treatments being out-weighed by a large volume of amateur historical studies, memoirs, picture books, websites, and wargames.

=== Key works ===
Paul Hausser's 1953 book Waffen-SS im Einsatz (Waffen-SS in Action) was the first major work by one of the HIAG leaders. It had an unmistakable connection to the Nazi origins of the Waffen-SS: the SS runes on the cover art and the SS motto ("My honour is loyalty") embossed on the cloth cover. Former Wehrmacht general Heinz Guderian endorsed Waffen-SS troops in a foreword and referred to them as "the first realisation of the European idea". Hausser went on to describe the growth of the Waffen-SS into a so-called multinational force where foreign volunteers fought heroically as a "militant example of the great European idea". Waffen-SS in Action was included in the index of objectionable war books maintained by West Germany's Federal Department for Media Harmful to Young Persons. The index was created in 1960 to limit the sale of such works to minors due to their chauvinism and glorification of violence.

Kurt Meyer's memoirs, Grenadiere (Grenadiers), published in 1957, detailed his exploits at the front and served as an element of the rehabilitation campaign. He condemned the "inhuman suffering" that the Waffen-SS personnel had been subjected to "for crimes which they neither committed, nor were able to prevent". Sydnor referred to Grenadiers as "perhaps the boldest and most truculent of the apologist works". Felix Steiner published The Volunteers of Waffen-SS: Idea and Sacrifice (Die Freiwilligen der Waffen-SS: Idee und Opfergang) in 1958. It presented the sacrifice messages echoing those of Der Freiwillige and stressed the theme of the purely military Waffen-SS.

In addition to memoirs, HIAG coordinated the writing of Waffen-SS unit histories. HIAG's "in" to the German Federal Military Archive was historian Ernst Klink of the Military History Research Office (MGFA), himself a former Waffen-SS man and a member of HIAG. According to Jens Westemeier's biography of Joachim Peiper, Klink was "one of the most important lobbyists for the in-house historical falsification" by HIAG. He gave lectures at veterans' meetings, assisted with documentation and "cultivated the image of the clean Wehrmacht".

The unit narratives were extensive (often in several volumes) and strived for a so-called official representation of their history, backed by maps and operational orders. According to historian Simon MacKenzie, "the older or the more famous the unit, the larger the work—to the point where no less than five volumes and well over 2,000 pages were devoted to the doings of the SS Division Das Reich", authored by Otto Weidinger. Researcher Danny S. Parker notes the efforts undertaken to rewrite the history of the SS Division Leibstandarte. (Note: According to Parker, "the way the old comrades wanted it remembered".) HIAG worked with Rudolf Lehmann, chief of staff of 1st SS Panzer Corps, to produce what Parker calls an "exculpating multi-volume chronicle" of the division, even including the Malmedy massacre. The project also included the former chief of staff of the unit, Dietrich Ziemssen, who in 1952 produced a revisionist version of the massacre in his pamphlet Der Malmedy Prozess. (Note: Danny Parker calls the pamphlet an "exculpatory manifesto" and writes: "The literary subversion worked. Now the SS veterans moved themselves from the prosecutors to the prosecuted!")

=== HIAG's historical revisionism ===
By the mid-1950s, HIAG had established an image that separated the Waffen-SS from other SS formations and shifted responsibility for crimes that could not be denied to the Allgemeine-SS (security and police), the SS-Totenkopfverbände (concentration camp units), and the Einsatzgruppen (mobile killing squads). The Waffen-SS was thus successfully integrated into the myth of the clean Wehrmacht.

The positive image of the Waffen-SS as an organisation indeed took root, and not only in Germany itself. In the era of the Cold War, senior Waffen-SS personnel were "not shy about the fact that they had once organised a NATO-like army, and an elite one at that", notes MacKenzie (emphasis in the original). John M. Steiner, in his 1975 work, points out that SS apologists, especially strongly represented in HIAG, stressed that they were the first to fight for Europe and Western civilisation against "Asiatic Communist hordes".

German historian Karsten Wilke, who wrote a book on HIAG, Die "Hilfsgemeinschaft auf Gegenseitigkeit" (HIAG) 1950–1990: Veteranen der Waffen-SS in der Bundesrepublik ("HIAG 1950–1990: Waffen-SS Veterans in the Federal Republic"), notes that, by the 1970s, HIAG attained a monopoly on the historical representation of the Waffen-SS. Its recipe was simple and contained just four ingredients:

- The Waffen-SS was apolitical.
- It was elite.
- It was innocent of all war crimes or Nazi atrocities.
- It was a European army par excellence, the Army of Europe.

Historians dismiss, and even ridicule, this characterisation. Picaper labels it as a "self-panegyric", while Large uses the words "extravagant fantasies about [Waffen-SS's] past and future". MacKenzie refers to HIAG's body of work as a "chorus of self-justification" and Stein as "apologetics". Historian James M. Diehl describes HIAG's claims of the Waffen-SS being the so-called fourth branch of the Wehrmacht as "false", and HIAG's insistence that the force was a precursor to NATO as "even more outrageous".

German accounts, and HIAG's contributions among them, were embraced by the US military complex as it prepared for an armed conflict with the Soviet Union. The narrative also found its way into popular culture, with many works translated into English. Historians Ronald Smelser and Edward J. Davies write: (Note: Smelser and Davies: "Unfortunately, the scholarly writings remained confined to a small audience, whereas the readership of the German authors (and their English-language spin-offs) was considerably larger". The authors write that "with a forty-year head start", the predominance of the German account, and the related fascination by Waffen-SS romancers, "hardly remains a mystery".)

Paradoxically, these post-Cold War books thrived despite two decades of German, Israeli and American scholarship that convincingly portrayed the Wehrmacht and the Waffen-SS as part of the killing machine in the East. (...) Little if any sentiment has been extended [by the Americans] to the families of the 8 million Red Army soldiers who died fighting the Wehrmacht and the Waffen-SS, or the 22 million civilians killed by these military organisations and the killing squads, the Einsatzgruppen.

As a "crucible of historical revisionism" (in Picaper's definition), HIAG achieved remarkable success in its rewriting of history, unlike in its goals of economic or legal rehabilitation of the Waffen-SS. The results are felt to this day in public's perceptions and popular culture.

== Waffen-SS groups in the 21st century ==
Der Freiwillige was still being published in the 2000s. At some point, Der Freiwillige and the Munin Verlag publishing business had been taken over by Patrick Agte, a right-wing author and publisher. Regional HIAG chapters continued to exist through the 2000s, at least one into the 2010s. These groups worked to maintain momentum through the recruitment of younger generations and through outreach to foreign veterans of the Waffen-SS, aided by the continued publication of Der Freiwillige. "[Its] acclaimed aim, today [2014], is to link older and younger generations in a common cause," note the historians Steffen Werther and Madeleine Hurd. The publication's predominant theme continued to be "Europe against Bolshevism", with several editorials devoted to the idea that the Waffen-SS laid the foundation for the unification of Europe, the expansion of NATO and "freedom of Fatherlands", as stated in one of the issues.

HIAG's informal successor was the international War Grave Memorial Foundation "When All Brothers Are Silent" (Kriegsgräberstiftung 'Wenn alle Brüder schweigen'), formed with a stated goal of maintaining war graves. In the 1990s and 2000s, after the fall of the Berlin Wall, it worked on arranging new commemorative sites for Waffen-SS dead in the former Soviet Union, including one in Ukraine.

== Contemporary revisionist tradition ==
HIAG was instrumental in creating the perception in popular culture of the Waffen-SS being "comrades-in-arms engaged in a noble crusade" (according to MacKenzie). These notions were questioned by West German researchers, but German society overall, wanting to forget the past, embraced the image. MacKenzie highlights the long-term effects of HIAG's revisionism:

As an older generation of Waffen-SS scribes has died off, a new, post-war cadre of writers has done much to perpetuate the image of the force as a revolutionary European army. The degree of admiration and acceptance varies, but the overall tendency to accentuate the positive lives on, or has indeed grown stronger.

Historian Bernd Wegner observes that any survey of the literature on the history of the Waffen-SS would show "an immense discrepancy between the veritable avalanche of titles and the quite modest yield of credible and scholarly insight". James Pontolillo, who studied Waffen-SS war crimes, notes that the majority of books that have the force as their topic fall into three groups: amateur historical studies that focus solely on the military aspects of the Waffen-SS; apologetic accounts by former Waffen-SS men; and works by a multinational group of admirers who judge the Waffen-SS to be unfairly associated with the crimes of Nazi Germany.

=== Popular history ===
MacKenzie offers a list of authors he contends carry on the Waffen-SS revisionism tradition (quoted material is from his work Revolutionary Armies in the Modern Era: A Revisionist Approach):

- John Keegan; James S. Lucas; Bruce Quarrie —popular historians "partially or wholly seduced by the [Waffen-SS] mystique"
- Ernst Nolte; Andreas Hillgruber—conservative academics and leading journalists in Germany, "offering tacit support"

Smelser and Davies present a list of authors they consider to be "gurus". Gurus, by their definition, are "authors popular among the readers who romanticise the German Army and, in particular, the Waffen-SS". Their list includes (quoted material is from The Myth of the Eastern Front):

- Mark C. Yerger published 11 books up to 2008, mostly through Schiffer Publishing. Rather than conducting a prosopographic study with the extensive primary material collected, Yerger focuses on the exploits of the Waffen-SS. According to Smelser and Davies, he has been "influenced away from objectivity" through close contacts with the veterans. Among the Waffen-SS men he admires, Yerger includes Otto Kumm, whose leadership of the Regiment Der Fuehrer he describes as "both incredible as well as legendary", and Otto Weidinger, "a much admired and trusted friend".
- Franz Kurowski, a veteran of the Eastern Front, saw his two major works released in the U.S. in 1992 (Panzer Aces) and 1994 (Infantry Aces) by J.J. Fedorowicz Publishing. The series focuses on so-called Panzer aces, including Waffen-SS commanders such as Kurt Meyer and Michael Wittmann. Kurowski's accounts are "laudatory texts that cast the German soldier in an extraordinarily favorable light", the authors conclude.
- Marc Rikmenspoel, a "guru" and a translator of HIAG's Munin-Verlag titles for J.J. Fedorowicz. He romanticizes the Waffen-SS while ignoring their crimes.
- Antonio J Munoz focuses on the foreign formations of the Waffen-SS and "combines exhaustive research with a heroic description of his subjects".

The historian Henning Pieper notes a "huge array of non-scholarly works which can be summarised as belonging to genre of 'militaria literature'". He includes books by Christopher Ailsby, Herbert Walther (writer), and Tim Ripley in this group. Military historian Robert Citino offers a list of works that he argues "flirt with the admiration" for the Waffen-SS, with some going "farther than that":

- Willi Fey: Armor Battles of the Waffen-SS, 1943–1945
- Michael Reynolds: Men of Steel: I SS Panzer Corps and Sons of the Reich: II Panzer Corps
- Bruce Quarrie: Hitler's Teutonic Knights: SS Panzers in Action
- Michael Sharpe and Brian L. Davis: Waffen-SS Elite Forces–I

=== Websites and wargames ===
Smelser and Davies argue that the revisionist-inspired messages and visuals found their way into some wargames, Internet chat rooms, and forums, and helped to spread the popular-culture view of the Wehrmacht and Waffen-SS "romancers", that is, those who romanticise the German war effort. Avalon Hill, which was a major American manufacturer of board games, started issuing board games dedicated to World War II and other military subjects in the 1950s. Simulations Publications, was another American publisher of board wargames and related magazines, focused exclusively on wargaming. It also issued related magazines, particularly its flagship Strategy & Tactics, in the 1970s and early 1980s.

Originally, the communications of the popular-culture Wehrmacht and Waffen-SS "romancers" were limited to print magazines and their face-to-face interactions at gaming conventions. The Internet era has greatly expanded the opportunities for communications between the gurus, "romancers", and others who agree with their philosophies, providing a forum for a so-called "non-political celebration" of the fighting qualities of the Wehrmacht and the Waffen-SS. Smelser and Davies contend that the following websites, among others, are especially attractive to this group:

- Achtung Panzer
- Feldgrau (formerly German Armed Forces in World War II); managed by Jason Pipes

=== Waffen-SS reenactment ===
Popular culture of the romancers also includes Waffen-SS reenactment. Although banned in Germany and Austria, SS reenacting groups thrive elsewhere, including in Europe and North America. In the US alone, by the end of the 1990s there were 20 Waffen-SS reenactment groups, out of approximately 40 groups dedicated to German World War II units. In contrast, there were 21 groups dedicated to the American units of the same timeframe. The website of US Waffen-SS reenactor group Wiking was quoted by The Atlantic in 2010 as follows:

Nazi Germany had no problem in recruiting the multitudes of volunteers willing to lay down their lives to ensure a "New and Free Europe", free of the threat of Communism. (...) Thousands upon thousands of valiant men died defending their respective countries in the name of a better tomorrow. We salute these idealists.

Historians quoted in The Atlantic categorically rejected this contemporary characterisation. According to Charles Sydnor, these groups "don't know their history" and have "a sanitized, romanticized view of what occurred". Citino went further and condemned the reenacting activities, stating: "The entire German war effort in the East was a racial crusade to rid the world of 'subhumans'. (...) It sends a shiver up my spine to think that people want to dress up and play SS on the weekend".
