= Wilfred von Oven =

Nazi propagandist (1912–2008)

Wilfred von Oven (4 May 1912 – 13 June 2008) was a German-Bolivian journalist, publicist and civil servant who served as the Press Adjutant of Nazi Propaganda Minister Joseph Goebbels between 1943 and the German capitulation in 1945.

== Biography ==
Wilfred von Oven was born in La Paz, Bolivia to German parents Kurd Alfred Wolfgang von Oven (1875–1917) and his wife Elisabeth "Elsbeth", née Seiler (1878–1966), the father's side having a military tradition. He had three siblings.

Several relatives held high rank in the German Army: distant uncle honorary General of the Infantry Ernst Friedrich Otto von Oven (1859–1945) was the highest ranking German officer in the field at the Armistice and subsequently reported directly to the Minister of Defence. His uncle honorary Major General Georg Karl Alfred von Oven (1868–1938) commanded two regiments and the 5. Garde-Infanterie-Brigade in WWI. Both generals were awarded the Pour le Mérite helped form Freikorps paramilitaries to combat sparticists and communists of the Bavarian Soviet Republic in 1919.

His father had moved to Bolivia and was head of the company E. & W. Hardt in La Paz. In 1914, the family returned to their German homeland and Kurd von Oven volunteered for the Imperial German Army and served as an interpreter. He was KIA on 18 June 1917 near Selvigny/Cambrai, France.

Wilfred von Oven joined the NSDAP and its paramilitary wing, the SA, on 1 May 1931, but resigned from both exactly one year later in protest at the shift of Nazism further to the right (the "Stennes Revolt"). Oven was interested in journalism and served with the Nazis' Legion Condor in Spain as a war correspondent. After obtaining an Army commission in 1939 he served with the Propaganda Ministry as a war correspondent at the fronts in Poland and the Soviet Union during the Second World War. In 1943, with the rank of Lieutenant, the OKW appointed him as Goebbels' Press adjutant, which he remained until the end of the war.

In a German TV documentary on the "German Resistance", Oven described the events of the 20 July plot which he witnessed. On the afternoon in question the Propaganda Ministry on the Wilhelmstrasse, with Goebbels inside, was surrounded by disloyal troops. Goebbels ordered Oven to discover whether escape was possible. He found they were trapped but reported that the telephone system was still working, an oversight by the plotters which assisted in their downfall.

At the capitulation of the Wehrmacht on 8 May 1945, von Oven went into hiding under an assumed name to escape Allied internment: Werner Naumann, the replacement Propaganda Minister for Goebbels whose assistant Oven would have been, fled to Argentina in 1946, where Oven arrived in 1951. Oven was declared persona non grata by the Federal German Embassy in Buenos Aires and remained a committed Nazi. He continued to reject Christianity for paganism in Argentina. He was married, and the author of several books and numerous magazine articles.

In his book Auschwitz: The Nazis and The 'Final Solution', Laurence Rees discusses an interview he conducted with von Oven. He was asked if he could sum up his experience of the Third Reich in one word, what would it be, to which Oven responded: "Paradise".

== Death ==
Von Oven died in Buenos Aires, Argentina on 13 June 2008, aged 96.

== Awards and decorations ==
- Spanish Cross in Gold
- Medalla de la Campaña
- Iron Cross (1939), 2nd and 1st Class
- Winter Battle in the East 1941–42 Medal
- Panzer Badge in Silver
- GfP Ulrich von Hutten Medal in 1997

== Writings ==
- Schluss mit Polen, 1939.
- Panzer am Balkan – Erlebnisbuch der Panzergruppe von Kleist, 1941.
- Mit Goebbels bis zum Ende, 1949.
  - also published as Finale Furioso – Mit Goebbels bis zum Ende, 1974 and as Dr. G. – Meister der Propaganda
- Argentinien. Stern Südamerikas, 1957.
- 100 Jahre Deutscher Krankenverein, 1857–1957. Ein Jahrhundert deutsch-argentinischer Gemeinschaft im Spiegel des Wachsens und Werdens ihrer grössten und bedeutendsten Vereinigung. Buenos Aires: Imprenta Mercur, 1957.
- 150 Jahre Argentinien. 1810–1960, 1960.
- Argentinien, Paraguay, Uruguay. Land am Silberstrom, die La-Plata-Länder, 1969.
- Hitler und der Spanische Bürgerkrieg. Mission und Schicksal der Legion Condor, 1978.
- Wer war Goebbels? Biographie aus der Nähe, 1987.
- Mit ruhig festem Schritt. Aus der Geschichte der SA, 1998.
- Ein „Nazi“ in Argentinien, 1999.
- Wilhelm Canaris. Der Admiral und seine Mitverantwortung am Verlauf des Krieges, Deutsche Verlags-Gesellschaft, Preußisch Oldendorf 2001, ISBN 3-920722-66-3.
