= Willi Fey =

German writer

- Born: 25 September 1918; Lollar, Hesse-Nassau, Prussia, German Empire
- Died: 29 April 2002 (aged 83); Freiburg, Baden-Württemberg, Germany
- Military career
- Allegiance: Nazi Germany
- Branch: German Army
- Awards: Knight's Cross of the Iron Cross

Wilhelm “Willi" Fey (25 September 1918 – 29 April 2002) was a WWII German panzer ace. During World War II, he served in the armoured troops of the Waffen-SS, destroying many enemy armored vehicles. In the Normandy battles during the summer of 1944 he was credited with the destruction of 69 allied tanks. Fey also served in the Battle Of the Bulge and on the Eastern Front.

Following the war, Fey served in the Bundeswehr. He wrote an account of his combat experiences titled (English edition) Armor Battles Of The Waffen SS: 1943-45.

== Awards ==
- Knight's Cross of the Iron Cross on 29 April 1945 as SS-Oberscharführer and Panzer commander in the schwere SS-Panzer-Abteilung 502

=== Bibliography ===
- Citino, Robert M. (2012). The Wehrmacht Retreats: Fighting a Lost War, 1943. Lawrence, KS: University Press of Kansas. ISBN 978-0-7006-1826-2.
- Fellgiebel, Walther-Peer (2000) [1986]. Die Träger des Ritterkreuzes des Eisernen Kreuzes 1939–1945 [The Bearers of the Knight's Cross of the Iron Cross 1939–1945] (in German). Friedberg, Germany: Podzun-Pallas. ISBN 978-3-7909-0284-6.
- Scherzer, Veit (2007). Die Ritterkreuzträger 1939–1945 [The Knight's Cross Bearers 1939–1945] (in German). Jena, Germany: Scherzers Militaer-Verlag. ISBN 978-3-938845-17-2.
