= George Forty =

British Army officer (1927-2016)

George Forty OBE
- Born: 10 September 1927; London, England
- Died: 19 May 2016 (aged 88)
- Education: Ashville College, Harrogate, Yorkshire
- Alma mater: Queen's College, Oxford
- Occupations: Military writer & museum director
- Spouse: Anne Forty
- Children: 4
- Military career
- Allegiance: United Kingdom
- Branch: British Army
- Service years: 1945–1971
- Unit: 1st Royal Tank Regiment
- Conflicts: Korean War * Third Battle of the Hook

George Forty OBE (10 September 1927 – 19 May 2016) was a British Army officer who was chief of staff of the Royal Armoured Corps gunnery school and later director of the Tank Museum, and also author of many books on warfare.

== Education and military career ==
Forty was born in London and educated at Ashville College and at Queen's College, Oxford University.

He joined the British Army in 1945, and was part of the first post-war class commissioned from the Royal Military Academy Sandhurst in 1948. He served in the British Army of the Rhine in the 1st Royal Tank Regiment, in Korea, where he was wounded in the Third Battle of the Hook in May 1953, and in Aden, the Persian Gulf and Borneo in command of an armoured reconnaissance squadron. After attending the Staff College in 1959, he held appointments at the Army Air Corps Centre and the Royal Armoured Corps Tactical, Signals and Gunnery Schools before retiring in 1971.

== Writer and museum director ==
Forty published more than 70 books with a focus on armoured warfare and also on wartime in Dorset. From 1981 until his retirement in 1993 he served as the curator (director) of the Tank Museum. He modernised and greatly expanded it, becoming known as the "father of the Tank Museum". Forty's wife, Anne, worked with him at the Tank Museum. They had four sons, one of whom works at the Royal Signals Museum.

== Honours ==
Forty was elected a Fellow of the Museums Association and in 1994 was appointed an OBE.

== Works ==
- Hitler's Atlantic Wall
- The Japanese Army Handbook 1939-1945 (1999)
- Companion to the British Army 1939-45
- US Marine Corps Handbook 1941-1945
- Patton's Third Army at War
- Desert Rats at War
- World Encyclopedia of Tanks and Armoured Vehicles
- Tiger Tank Battalions in World War II
- Battle of Crete
- The Armies of Rommel
- Road to Berlin
- The Soldier's Story: WWII German Infantryman
- The Reich's Last Gamble: The Ardennes Offensive, December 1944
- The Armies of George S. Patton
