= Jonathan House =

American military historian and author (born 1950)

- Born: June 22, 1950 (age 76); U.S.

Academic work
- Era: 20th century
- Institutions: United States Army Command and General Staff College
- Main interests: Military history: World War II; Cold War
- Notable works: Books on the Soviet-German war

Jonathan M. House (born June 22, 1950) is an American military historian and author. He is a professor emeritus of military history at the United States Army Command and General Staff College. House is a leading authority on Soviet military history, with an emphasis on World War II and the Soviet influence upon modern operational doctrine. Together with David Glantz, he wrote multiple books on the Red Army operations on the Eastern Front, most notably When Titans Clashed: How the Red Army Stopped Hitler.

== Education and career ==
House graduated from Hamilton College in 1971. In 1975, he completed his doctorate in history at the University of Michigan and was commissioned as an officer through the Army Reserve Officers' Training Corps. After numerous courses at the U.S. Army Intelligence Center and School (1978, 1979–80), he completed master's degrees in strategy (Command and General Staff College, 1984) and intelligence (King's College London, 2017).

House served as an intelligence analyst for the Joint Chiefs of Staff at The Pentagon during both the 1991 and 2003 conflicts with Iraq. He retired as a colonel of military intelligence. House is the author of Toward Combined Arms Warfare: a Survey of 20th-century Tactics, Doctrine, and Organization (1984), A Military History of the Cold War (2 vols, 2012 and 2020), Controlling Paris: Armed Forces and Counter-Revolution, 1789-1848 (2014), and Intelligence and the State (2022).

== Historian of German-Soviet War, 1941–1945 ==
Together with David Glantz, House co-authored several books on the military history of the Eastern Front, including The Battle of Kursk (1999); To the Gates of Stalingrad: Soviet-German combat operations, April–August 1942 (2009); Armageddon in Stalingrad: September–November 1942 (2009); and Endgame at Stalingrad (2014). In 2017, House was the primary author of a consolidated volume entitled simply Stalingrad. All books were published by the University Press of Kansas.

Their first collaboration, When Titans Clashed, was described upon initial publication in 1995 in an H-Net review as "belong[ing] in every college library and on the shelves of all World War II historians". The book was reissued in 2015 in an expanded edition; it was described by the military historian Steven Zaloga as "the best overview of the combat record of the Red Army in the Second World War".
