= The Myth of the Eastern Front =

2008 nonfiction book by Ronald Smelser and Edward J. Davies

- Book cover of The Myth of the Eastern Front; image adopted from cover art of the 1987 wargame The Last Victory: Von Manstein's Backhand Blow, February–March 1943, which depicts the Third Battle of Kharkov
- Author: Ronald Smelser and Edward J. Davies
- Language: English
- Genre: History, historiography
- Publisher: Cambridge University Press
- Publication date: 2008
- Publication place: United States
- Media type: Print
- ISBN: 978-0-521-83365-3

The Myth of the Eastern Front: The Nazi–Soviet War in American Popular Culture (2008) by Ronald Smelser and Edward J. Davies, is a historical analysis of the post-war myth of the "Clean Wehrmacht", the negative impact of the Wehrmacht and the Waffen-SS mythologies in popular culture, and the effects of historical negationism upon cultural perceptions of the Eastern Front of the Second World War.

The book garnered largely positive reviews. It was commended for its thorough analysis of the creation of the myth by German ex-participants and its entry into American culture, as well as its compelling analysis of contemporary war-romancing trends. One reviewer described the book as a "tour de force of cultural historiography", and another observed that it "presents a discomforting portrait of the American views of the Eastern Front".

== Background ==
At the time of the publication of The Myth of the Eastern Front, the authors were colleagues in the history department at the University of Utah. According to one reviewer, they were "well qualified for the task" of deconstructing the myth in the book's title: "Smelser is a widely published historian of Nazi Germany, while Davies, a self-confessed former adherent to the Ostfront myth, specializes in US history". In the preface to the book, Davies called the book's writing a "personal journey" and described how his interest in the Soviet–German War grew from reading Hitler Drives East by Paul Carell. Davies became a devotee, with hundreds of books on the Eastern Front in his library. His private collection of wargames was part of the source material in the book.

== Structure ==
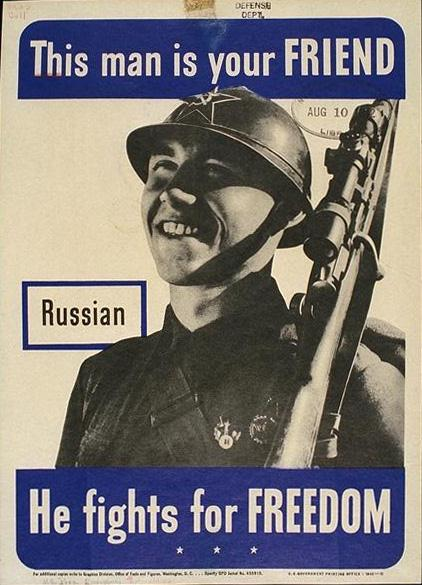
US propaganda poster, 1942: Photo of smiling Russian soldier. US media also played a key role in shaping a positive image of the Soviet Union during World War II.

The first section of the book focuses on the prevailing American attitudes towards Nazi Germany, the Wehrmacht, and the SS in the period during World War II and its immediate aftermath. The authors' sources were newspapers, magazines, and other American media of the period. The book also discusses the role of war-time American propaganda in shaping a positive image of the Soviet Union as the United Kingdom's and the United States' ally.

The book then covers positive views of the Germans, produced early in the Cold War era. These arose due to the changing geopolitical climate, the appearance of German military sources which vindicated their side of the conflict, and support of this effort by the American military. Such works "emphasized love of family, professions of Christianity, charity toward the enemy, and heroic self-sacrifice, [while ignoring] mass murder, anti-partisan warfare (deliberately mislabeled by the Nazi regime in 1942 as 'combating bandits,' or Bandenbekämpfung), property confiscation, complicity in forced labor roundups, and wanton destruction". A review for H-Net found that "the authors do a thorough job discrediting the claims made by the German officers in their memoirs, which can no longer be viewed as even minimally respectable".

The third section of the book discusses the appearance of a new generation of "devotees of the German army and its campaigns in the east". They included new authors, wargaming fans, and World War II reenactment participants. The review in H-Net found that this section provided "insightful and exciting research" and that "Smelser and Davies astutely identify a set of sources historians have rarely tapped and survey it thoroughly." They identified the so-called "gurus" of this generation, influential authors and speakers which presented "a heroic, sanitized picture of the German army in the east".

== Themes ==
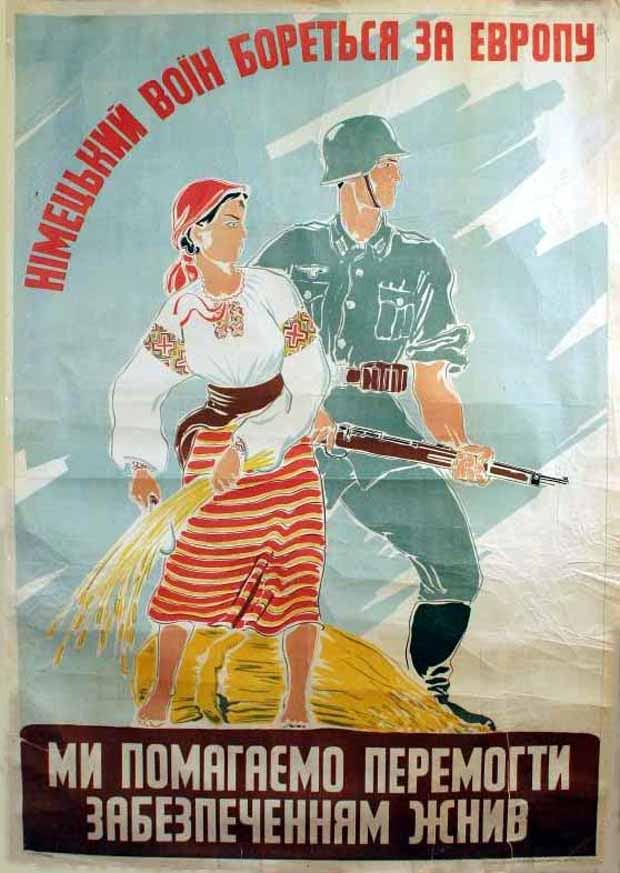
Nazi propaganda poster in Ukrainian; the headline reads: "German soldier is fighting for Europe". According to the introduction, the book examines, in part, the "romantic heroicization of the German army fighting to save Europe from a rapacious Communism".

In the words of one reviewer, the central myth described in the book boils down to the following:

The German army, or Wehrmacht, fought a "clean" and valiant war against the Soviet Union, devoid of ideology and atrocity. The German officer caste did not share Hitler's ideological precepts and blamed the SS and other Nazi paramilitary organizations for creating the war of racial enslavement and extermination that the conflict became.

The German Landser, or soldier, as far as conditions allowed, was generally paternal and kind to the Soviet citizens and uninterested in Soviet Jewry. That the German military lost this war was due in no way to its battlefield acumen, but to a combination of external factors, first and foremost Hitler's decisions. According to this myth, the defeat of Germany on the Eastern Front constituted a tragedy, not just for Germans, but for Western civilization.

The Myth of the Eastern Front deconstructs this myth and introduces several themes, which in the authors' opinion are important to the understanding of the origins, longevity, and the impact of the Eastern Front mythology. The work discusses how state propaganda shaped popular perceptions during World War II, then proceeds to the inadvertent role that the US Army Historical Division played in providing the German military commanders with an opportunity to put down their recollections of the Soviet–German conflict. The authors also address the parallels between the Lost Cause of the Confederacy in the post–American Civil War era and the myth of the clean Wehrmacht. In its later chapters, the book focuses on the romanticization of the German war effort in contemporary popular culture, especially with regards to the "elite" units such as the Waffen-SS.

== Reception ==
Lawrence Freedman in Foreign Affairs magazine called the book a "fascinating exercise in historiography", highlighting its analysis of how "a number of Hitler's leading generals were given an opportunity to write the history of the Eastern Front to help develop lessons for the Americans on fighting the Russians, and in doing so they provided a sanitized version of events". However, Freedman also noted that the impact of this involvement on US perceptions of the Eastern Front was less clear. The review by Joseph Robert White, titled "A Noble But Sisyphean Effort", concluded by quoting the book's closing sentence: "The 'good German' seems destined for an eternal life". White observed that the book "should nonetheless provide food for thought in classroom discussions about the German army", but noted that an assumption of specialized knowledge and the concomitant lack of a chapter about war crimes committed by the Wehrmacht undermined the authors' efforts to challenge the myth.

Historian Lawrence N. Powell lamented in his review how "The swiftness with which Cold War America embraced vanquished Nazi officers, along with their sanitization of Wehrmacht criminality on the Eastern Front, is a chilling reminder of how historical memory often follows the flag." He commended the two authors, saying that they had "performed a signal service" in bringing to light these myths about the second World War.

The military historian Jonathan House, who wrote the 1995 book When Titans Clashed on the Soviet–German War with David Glantz, reviewed the book for The Journal of Military History, describing it as a "tour de force of cultural historiography". He noted Smelser's and Davies's analysis of the post-war mythology that presented the Wehrmacht and even the Waffen-SS as "above reproach, knights engaged in a crusade to defend Western civilization against the barbaric hordes of Bolshevism. ... Ronald Smelser and Edward Davies have performed a signal service by tracing the origin and spread of this mythology". House recommended that military historians not only study the book, but "use it to teach students the dangers of bias and propaganda in history". He also noted that in exploring its subject, the book provided a "one-sided view of the historiography" by not taking into account the contemporary, balanced works on the Soviet–German War, such as by Glantz and others.

Edward B. Westermann, historian and author of Hitler's Police Battalions: Enforcing Racial War in the East, called it "A superb and insightful study of the premeditated manipulation of history and memory in the fabrication of the myth of a 'clean Wehrmacht'." He further stated that it "Expertly exposes the intersection and influence of popular imagination, politics, and popular culture in the rewriting of the German army's experience in World War Two."

Benjamin Alpers, in The American Historical Review, the official publication of the American Historical Association, noted that the book "present[s] a discomforting portrait of the American views of the Eastern Front." He commended the authors "for exploring sources such as website and war games, that, while usually not studied by historians, are places where Americans encounter and enact World War II memory". However, the review also concluded that the authors' analysis of their material "is not entirely convincing", and also observed that they underplayed key divergences in their analogy between neo-Confederate ideas of the American Civil War and the mythic views of the Eastern Front.

Historian Norman J. W. Goda, who specialized in the history of Nazi Germany and the Holocaust, called the book "a masterful and incisive combination of military and cultural history". He added that the two authors "vividly show how the pernicious idea of an honorable German war on the Eastern Front permeated the American consciousness with devastating consequences not only for the broad understanding of German atrocities in the East, but ultimately for the Cold War itself."

Professor Christopher A. Hartwell provided a critical assessment of the book in a review published in German Studies Review. He described the book as "interesting, but ultimately disappointing" and argued that the authors committed several egregious errors, with the most prominent being the whitewash of Red Army crimes on the Eastern Front, while denigrating those [authors] who do mention them "as contributing to the exoneration of the Wehrmacht". He noted that the book tends to suffer from a lack of perspective "on the effect the German generals had on the broader American perception of the war [on the Eastern Front]." Furthermore, Hartwell stated that the effect and influence of those "romancers" on American culture was not "impressively support[ed]" in the thesis, and the case that "romancers" were able to "effectively spread the myth of the innocent Wehrmacht" was not made out. Due to the lack of perspective, the book tended to lump together "those with an interest in military history and those who actually subscribe to neo-Nazi beliefs", and Hartwell concluded: "As it stands now, however, this tome has the feel of a dissertation that is trying too hard to find a niche that hasn't seen the light of day".

Kelly McFall of Newman University described the book as a "fascinating immersion into a simple but important question: How did the German soldiers who fought on the eastern front during World War Two become hero figures to so many Americans?" McFall found the discussion on the iconography of the 1970s and 1980s wargames to be "path-breaking" and noted that the authors convinced her of the "existence of a community of 'buffs' who have made a fetish of the German army as super-efficient and super-heroic". However, she added that it was unclear how influential this community is outside of its niche, and what impact the rise of computer gaming may have had on this group.

David Wildermuth of Shippensburg University of Pennsylvania concurred with the author's argument regarding the potential danger of "depoliticiz[ing] a conflict which at its core was a war of racial subjugation and conquest". He found the authors' analysis of war-romancing trends to be "deep and compelling", but noted the book's limitations in assuming specialist knowledge, which made it less accessible to the public. For example, lay readers would have benefited from the context of the differences between Waffen-SS and Wehrmacht, along with an overview of the war crimes committed by the Waffen-SS, "especially in light of the falsehoods appearing daily in Internet website chatrooms". The reviewer also remarked on the occasional sniping which made palpable the authors' frustrations with "romantic notions of a valiant German military". Despite this minor criticism, Wildermuth commended the book for its "fascinating analysis on how, far removed from its time and place, the echoes of this war still reverberate".

Martin H. Folly provided a critical assessment of the book in a review published in the journal History. While he complimented the authors for setting out the main myths concerning the Eastern Front, he argued that they did not provide convincing evidence to support their argument that most Americans accept such an account of the Soviet–German War. Moreover, Folly stated that the book overlooked the influence of prominent and more accurate accounts of the war on the Eastern Front. His summary was that "the book therefore delivers a rather weak conclusion, which dilutes the impact of the useful analysis earlier in the book on the creation of the myth by German ex-participants and its entry into American culture with the help of the US Army".

American historian Dennis Showalter, in his review of the book for the journal Central European History, described the book as "incomplete", noting that "Eastern Front romanticism has cultural as well as intellectual matrices that are a good deal more complex than Smelser and Davis acknowledge", such as the appeal of "individual struggle against overwhelming odds" in the German narratives of the war, vs the Soviet emphasis on the collective. He also described how the Soviet World War II historiography, overly dogmatic and propaganda-driven, remained untranslated in the West, allowing the German view of the conflict to dominate academic and popular perceptions. He acknowledged that the romanticized views described in the book existed but argued that they remain limited in their impact on the wider popular culture: "Third Reich military memorabilia thrives—but in a niche market. (...) Eastern Front enthusiasts—who buy a disproportionate number of the books romanticizing the Eastern Front—are a minority within a minority, and, as a rule, are at some pains to deny sympathy with the Third Reich". The reviewer concludes that opening of the archives since the dissolution of the Soviet Union has enabled "balanced analysis at academic levels", leading to a new interest in the Red Army operations from the popular history writers and the World War II enthusiasts.

== Cover art ==
The book's cover art, which wraps around the front and the back of the book, features an image adopted from the 1987 wargame The Last Victory: Von Manstein's Backhand Blow, February–March 1943 from Clash of Arms Games. The game is devoted to the Third Battle of Kharkov, which, under the command of Field Marshal Erich von Manstein, resulted in the recapture of the city and the stabilization of the front following the Wehrmacht's defeat in the Battle of Stalingrad.

The box cover art depicts a German panzer commander with a "stern-looking face". The authors describe the image: "He is standing up, in an open hatch. Behind him is a line of Tiger tanks stretching along a city street. In the background, in blue with mist and smoke rising, stands Kharkov. The Nazi swastika sits in a lit circle to the top left of the cover". The book further notes that the accompanying materials "praise Manstein for his brilliance and his ability to recognize the assets of extremely able commanders under him", such as Paul Hausser, who led a Waffen-SS panzer corps during the battle.

== See also ==
- Waffen-SS in popular culture
