= Edward J. Davies =

American historian

- Born: 1947 (age 78–79); U.S.
- Occupations: Historian, author

Academic background
- Education: University of Pittsburgh

Academic work
- Era: 19th and 20th centuries
- Institutions: University of Utah
- Main interests: American history, historiography
- Notable works: The Myth of the Eastern Front: The Nazi-Soviet War in American Popular Culture

Edward J. Davies (born 1947) is an American historian, author, and professor of history at the University of Utah. He specialises in modern American history and has written several books on the subject. Davies is the author, together with fellow historian Ronald Smelser, of the 2008 book The Myth of the Eastern Front: The Nazi-Soviet War in American Popular Culture.

== Education and career ==
Davies obtained his M.A. in history from the Lehigh University in 1970 and his Ph.D. in history from the University of Pittsburgh in 1977. In 1984, Davies was appointed an associate professor at the University of Utah; he became a full professor in 2008. Davies has served on the advisory board of the National Geographic’s Concise History of the World.

== Research on American history and popular culture ==
The 1985 book by Davies, The Anthracite Aristocracy: Leadership and Social Change in the Hard Coal Regions of Northeastern Pennsylvania, 1800-1930, focuses on the evolution of the social and economic structure of the American coal region. It explores the urban economics and social history of two towns, Wilkes-Barre and Pottsville, both in Pennsylvania.

Together with fellow historian Ronald Smelser of the University of Utah, Davies is the author of the 2008 book The Myth of the Eastern Front: The Nazi-Soviet War in American Popular Culture. It discusses perceptions of the Eastern Front of World War II in the United States in the context of historical revisionism. The book traces the foundation of the post-war myth of the "clean Wehrmacht", its support by U.S. military officials, and the impact of Wehrmacht and Waffen-SS mythology on American popular culture, including the present time. The book garnered largely positive reviews, for its thorough analysis on the creation of the myth by German ex-participants and its entry into American culture. Several reviews noted limitations of the book in its discussion on the myth's role in the contemporary culture and the extent of its impact on wide popular perceptions of the Eastern Front, outside of a few select groups.

The Foreign Affairs magazine called the book a "fascinating exercise in historiography", highlighting the authors' analysis of how a "number of Hitler's leading generals were given an opportunity to write the history of the Eastern Front (...) provid[ing] a sanitized version of events". Military historian Jonathan House reviewed the book for The Journal of Military History, describing it as a "tour de force of cultural historiography" and commending the authors for "hav[ing] performed a signal service by tracing the origin and spread of this mythology". House recommends that military historians not only study the book, but "use it to teach students the dangers of bias and propaganda in history".

== Select bibliography ==
- 1985 – The Anthracite Aristocracy: Leadership and Social Change in the Hard Coal Regions of Northeastern Pennsylvania, 1800-1930. Northern Illinois University Press
- 2006 – The United States in World History, Routledge, ISBN 978-0415275293.
- 2008 –The Myth of the Eastern Front: the Nazi-Soviet war in American popular culture, co-authored with Ronald Smelser, New York, Cambridge University Press, ISBN 978-0-521-83365-3
