= Ronald Smelser =

American historian (born 1942)

- Born: 1942 (age 83–84); Pennsylvania, United States
- Occupations: Professor of history; author; editor

Academic background
- Education: University of Wisconsin

Academic work
- Era: 20th century
- Institutions: University of Utah
- Main interests: Modern European history, historiography
- Notable works: The Myth of the Eastern Front: The Nazi-Soviet War in American Popular Culture

Ronald Michael Smelser (born 1942) is an American historian, author, and former professor of history at the University of Utah. He specializes in modern European history, including the history of Nazi Germany and the Holocaust, and has written several books on these topics. Smelser is the author, together with fellow historian Edward J. Davies, of the 2008 book The Myth of the Eastern Front: The Nazi-Soviet War in American Popular Culture.

== Education and career ==
Smelser was born in 1942 in Pennsylvania, United States. He obtained his Ph.D. in history in 1970 at the University of Wisconsin and was appointed as an assistant professor at Alma College (Michigan). In 1978, Smelser joined the history department at the University of Utah; he became a full professor in 1983. He also taught classes at the Free University of Berlin during the summer. He retired from the University of Utah in the 2010s, and, as of 2016, is Professor Emeritus at the school.

== Historian of Nazi Germany ==
Smelser is a historian of Nazi Germany and the Holocaust. He is the author of several books, including The Sudeten Problem 1933–1938: Volkstumspolitik and the Formulation of Nazi Foreign Policy and Robert Ley: Hitler's Labor Front Leader. Both books have been translated into German. He has also published seven edited or co-edited books and numerous articles. Smelser is the former president of the German Studies Association and the Conference Group for the journal Central European History, as well as a former member of the American Advisory Board of the German Historical Institute in Washington, D.C. In 2001 Smelser brought the U.S. Holocaust Memorial Museum's Nazi Olympics exhibit to the University of Utah as part of the Cultural Olympiad.

Smelser is the co-editor of four prosopographic anthologies (Note: Prosopography is an investigation of the common characteristics of a historical group, whose individual biographies may be largely untraceable, by means of a collective study of their lives, in multiple career-line analysis. Prosopographical research has the goal of learning about patterns of relationships and activities through the study of collective biography; it collects and analyses statistically relevant quantities of biographical data about a well-defined group of individuals.) in which he and his co-editors compiled biographical essays on leading figures of the Nazi movement and the Nazi state, authored by various historians. The first in the series was the 1989 work The Brown Elite I, co-edited with Rainer Zitelmann, with twenty-two biographical sketches of leaders of the Nazi Party and of functionaries of the military and the Nazi regime of World War II.

In 1993 Smelser published The Brown Elite II, which contained twenty additional sketches of the same type, co-edited with Enrico Syring. The 1995 volume was a collection of essays on the military elite of Nazi Germany, which included twenty-seven sketches specifically about military leaders of the Reichswehr and the Wehrmacht during the 1930s and 1940s. The 2000 volume, Die SS: Elite unter dem Totenkopf: 30 Lebensläufe (Elite under the Skull) contains biographical sketches of thirty leading members of the SS.

== Holocaust educator ==
Smelser established the annual Holocaust "Days of Remembrance" program at the University of Utah, directing it for 21 years. He has worked closely with the Holocaust Educational Foundation and is the editor-in-chief of the Learning about the Holocaust: A Student Guide. Based on the Encyclopedia of the Holocaust, the four-volume work presents the events surrounding the Holocaust to teenagers in the language they can understand.

Smelser has also studied the cultural impact of the Holocaust – from the marginal topic that it was in the 1950s and 60s to the event, in Smelser's words, that has "practically absorb[ed] the war". His research has focused on how several counterbalancing narratives of World War II and the Holocaust can co-exist, with the goal of demystifying and explaining their impact on popular culture.

== The Myth of the Eastern Front ==
Together with fellow historian Edward J. Davies of the University of Utah, Smelser is the author of the 2008 book The Myth of the Eastern Front: The Nazi-Soviet War in American Popular Culture. It discusses perceptions of the Eastern Front of World War II in the United States in the context of historical revisionism. The book traces the foundation of the post-war myth of the "clean Wehrmacht", its support by U.S. military officials, and the impact of Wehrmacht and Waffen-SS mythology on American popular culture, including in the present time. The book garnered largely positive reviews for its thorough analysis of the myth's creation by German ex-participants and its entry into American culture. Several reviews noted some limitations of the book: in its discussion of the myth's role in contemporary culture and the extent of its impact on widely held popular perceptions of the Eastern Front, outside of a few select groups.

Foreign Affairs magazine called the book a "fascinating exercise in historiography", highlighting the authors' analysis of how a "number of Hitler's leading generals were given an opportunity to write the history of the Eastern Front (...) provid[ing] a sanitized version of events". Military historian Jonathan House reviewed the book for The Journal of Military History, describing it as a "tour de force of cultural historiography" and commending the authors for "hav[ing] performed a signal service by tracing the origin and spread of this mythology". House recommends that military historians not only study the book, but "use it to teach students the dangers of bias and propaganda in history".

A review published in the journal History provided a critical assessment of the book. While it praises Smelser and Davies for setting out the main myths concerning the Eastern Front, the review argues that they did not provide convincing evidence to support their argument that most Americans accept such an account. It concludes that "the book therefore delivers a rather weak conclusion, which dilutes the impact of the useful analysis earlier in the book..." Likewise, American historian Dennis Showalter acknowledges that the romanticised views described in the book exist, but argues that they remain limited in their impact on the wider popular culture: "Eastern Front enthusiasts—who buy a disproportionate number of the books romanticizing the Eastern Front—are a minority within a minority, and, as a rule, are at some pains to deny sympathy with the Third Reich". The reviewer concludes that the opening of the Russian archives since the fall of the Soviet Union has enabled "balanced analysis at academic levels", leading to a new interest in the Red Army operations from popular history writers and World War II enthusiasts.

== Select bibliography ==
- 1975 – The Sudeten problem, 1933–1938: Volkstumspolitik and the Formulation of Nazi Foreign Policy, Middletown, Conn., Wesleyan University Press, ISBN 0-8195-4077-3
- 1988 – Robert Ley: Hitler's Labor Front leader, New York, Berg Publishers, ISBN 0-85496-161-5
- 2000 – Die SS: Elite unter dem Totenkopf: 30 Lebensläufe, co-edited with Enrico Syring, Paderborn, Verlag Ferdinand Schöningh, ISBN 3-506-78562-1
- 2001 – Learning about the Holocaust: A Student Guide, New York, Macmillan Reference USA, ISBN 0-02-865536-2
- 2008 –The Myth of the Eastern Front: the Nazi-Soviet war in American popular culture, co-authored with Edward J. Davies, New York, Cambridge University Press, ISBN 978-0-521-83365-3
