= Militaria =

Military equipment collected for their historical significance

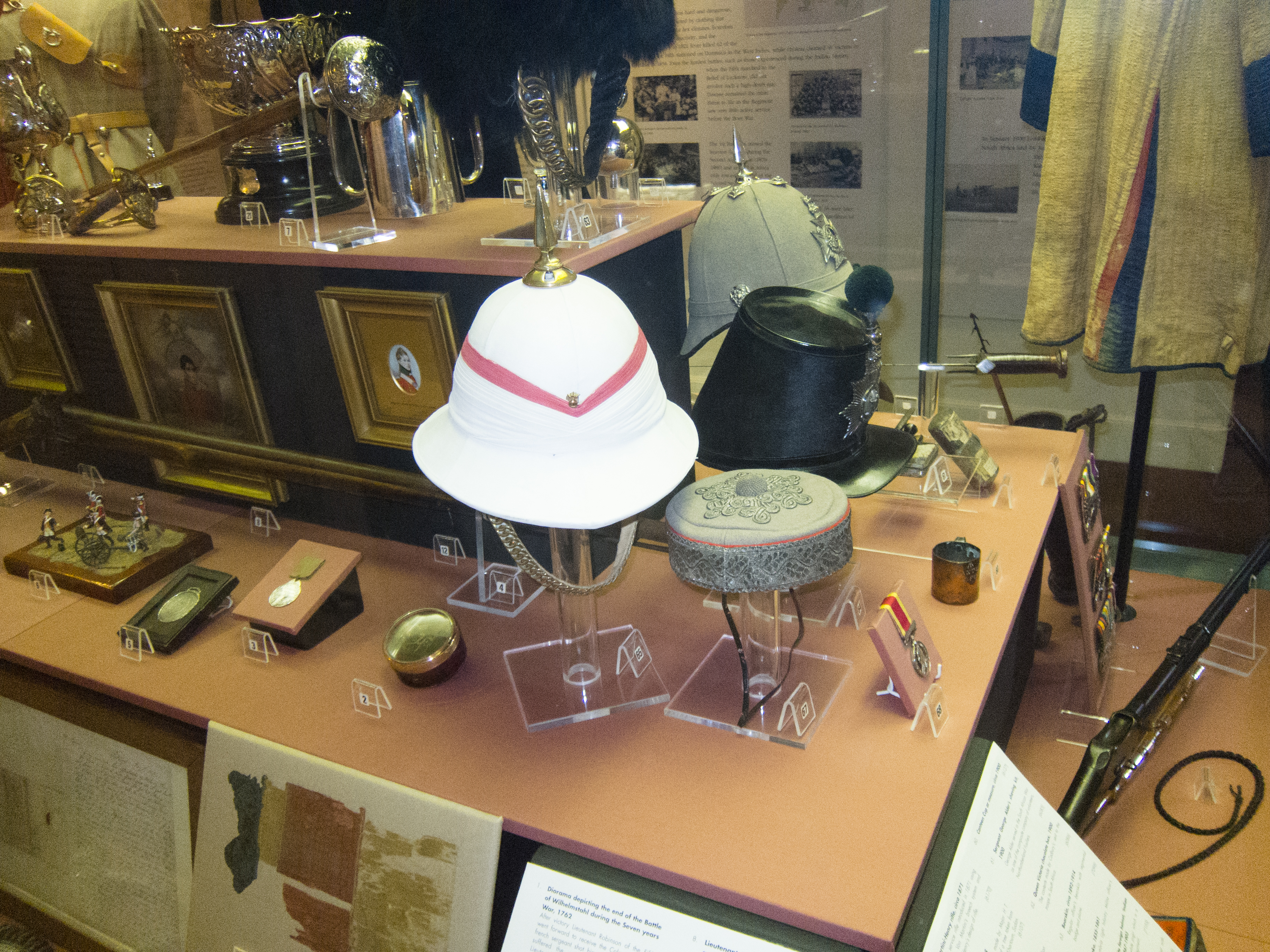
A display of militaria in the Fusiliers Museum of Northumberland

Militaria, also known as military memorabilia, are military equipment which are collected for their historical significance.

== History ==
The act of collecting militaria has roots in souvenir hunting, a practice first made popular among soldiers during World War I.

During the war, soldiers would walk through battlefields and trenches, taking military equipment and personal items from enemy POWs or, in most cases, dead bodies. Soldiers would send these items home to loved ones through post or in their belongings upon returning home.

Militaria collecting became nationalized during and at the end of World War I, through the 1917–1918 War Bonds Drive and the 1919 Victory Loan Drive. Captured German Pickelhaube, Stahlhelm, and other military equipment were showcased around the country as war trophies, some later being distributed to purchasers of bonds.

== Items ==
Such items include firearms, swords, sabres, knives, bayonets, helmets and other equipment such as uniforms, military orders and decorations and insignia.
