= List of German army groups in World War II =

This is a list of German army groups during World War II.

Some German formations during World War II were designated Heeresgruppe and others Armeegruppe. Both terms are usually translated into English as "army group" but refer to different concepts.

== Differences between Heeresgruppe and Armeegruppe ==
Some German formations, such as Army Group A, were known as Heeresgruppe, whereas others, such as Army Group Liguria, were known as Armeegruppe. Both of these terms have, for a lack of alternatives, been translated into English as "army group". Generally, the major army groups were Heeresgruppen, whereas the term Armeegruppe was used for formations that contained between two and three armies, initially reserved for those formations that included non-German armies. For instance, Army Group Balck contained the 6th German Army and the 3rd Hungarian Army.

== Heeresgruppen ==
The Heeresgruppen-type army groups of the Wehrmacht were:

- Army Group A
- Army Group B
- Army Group C
- Army Group D
- Army Group E
- Army Group F
- Army Group G
- Army Group H
- Army Group Africa (Heeresgruppe Afrika)
- Army Group Don
- Army Group Courland (Heeresgruppe Kurland)
- Army Group Centre (Heeresgruppe Mitte)
- Army Group North (Heeresgruppe Nord)
- Army Group North Ukraine (Heeresgruppe Nordukraine)
- Army Group Ostmark (Heeresgruppe Ostmark)
- Army Group South (Heeresgruppe Süd)
- Army Group South Ukraine (Heeresgruppe Südukraine)
- Army Group Upper Rhine (Heeresgruppe Oberrhein)
- Army Group Vistula (Heeresgruppe Weichsel)

== Continuities of the Heeresgruppen ==
There were numerous redesignations applied to the Heeresgruppen-type army groups, which often overlapped with each other. For instance, "Army Group South" of the Invasion of Poland became "Army Group A" of the Western Campaign, which became "Army Group Center" during Operation Barbarossa. "Army Group North" during the Invasion of Poland became "Army Group B" in the west and then "Army Group South" in the east. "Army Group C" during the Polish and French campaigns became "Army Group North" during the Soviet campaign. The following diagram attempts to show what Heeresgruppe was renamed how and when.

The colors stand for the theaters of war: Invasion of Poland in pink, Battle of France in blue, Balkans campaign in purple, North Africa in orange, Eastern Front in red, Italian front in green, Western Front in yellow.

== Armeegruppen ==
Armeegruppen-type "army groups" were frequently named after their commanding officer.

The Armeegruppen of the Wehrmacht were:

- Army Group Balck
- Army Group Blumentritt
- Army Group Dumitrescu
- Army Group Felber
- Army Group Fretter-Pico
- Army Group G (formed on 28 April 1944 as Armeegruppe, converted on 12 September 1944 into Heeresgruppe)
- Army Group Guderian
- Army Group Heinrici
- Army Group Liguria
- Army Group Ruoff
- Army Group Steiner
- Army Group Student
- Army Group Weichs
- Army Group Wöhler

== Brief history of German army groups (Heeresgruppen) during World War II ==
The development of German army groups can be briefly summarized as follows:

- The invasion of Poland (September 1939) was conducted with two army groups: Army Group North and Army Group South.
- At the same time, Army Group C was charged with the defense of the western border.
- After the conclusion of the invasion of Poland in October 1939, Army Group North was reorganized into Army Group B and Army Group South was reorganized into Army Group A.
- The Battle of France (May–June 1940) was conducted with three army groups: Army Group B on the right flank, Army Group A in the center, and Army Group C in a generally defensive stance on the left flank (opposite the Maginot Line).
- To oversee the German occupation of France, Army Group D was formed on 25 October 1940. Its commander was additionally known as Oberbefehlshaber West after 15 March 1941.
- Operation Barbarossa (June 1941) initiated the German-Soviet War and was conducted by three army groups: Army Group North, Army Group Centre, and Army Group South.
- For Case Blue (summer 1942), Army Group South was split into Army Groups A and B, with Army Group A facing the Caucasus and Army Group B covering the northern approach.
- In November 1942, Army Group Don was inserted between Army Groups A and B. It was dissolved, shortly after the end of the Battle of Stalingrad, on 12 February 1943.
- On 1 January 1943, Army Group E was formed to oversee the German occupation in the Balkans.
- On 22 February 1943, the remnant German forces of the North African campaign were briefly combined into Army Group Afrika. It ceased to exist shortly after on 13 May 1943.
- On 9 March 1943, Army Group B was renamed Army Group South.
- On 17 July 1943, a new Army Group B was formed in southern Germany and northern Italy. It was later sent to German-occupied France on 1 December 1943.
- On 26 July 1943, a new Army Group C was formed in Italy to manage the Italian campaign.
- On 12 August 1943, Army Group F was formed in the Balkans.
- On 31 March 1944, Army Group A was renamed Army Group South Ukraine and Army Group South was renamed Army Group North Ukraine.
- On 28 April 1944, Army Group G was formed in German-occupied southern France.
- On 20 September 1944, Army Group South Ukraine was renamed Army Group South and Army Group North Ukraine was renamed Army Group A.
- On 11 November 1944, Army Group H was formed in the German-occupied Netherlands.
- On 25 January 1945, several redesignations took place: Army Group A became Army Group Centre, Army Group Centre became Army Group North, Army Group North (now trapped in the Courland Pocket) became Army Group Courland. A new army group, Army Group Vistula, was inserted between Army Groups North (previously Army Group Centre) and Army Group Centre (previously Army Group A).
- In April 1945, Army Group South was redesignated Army Group Ostmark.

== See also ==
- List of World War II military units of Germany
- List of German corps in World War II
- List of German divisions in World War II
- List of German brigades in World War II
