= Western Front command tenures (World War II) =

List of generals during WW2

This article is a tabular depiction of those generals who held command at the army group echelon or higher on the Western Front of World War II during 1944-1945, and is intended to serve as a reference that can be linked to by other World War II articles. Headquarters and commander names are linked for ease of reference.

Tenures of command on the Western Front in the Second World War, 1944-1945
Month	SHAEF	21st Army Group	12th Army Group	6th Army Group	OB West (OB Süd after 22 Apr 1945)	Army Group B	Army Group G	Army Group H (OB Nordwest after 7 Apr 1945)	OB Oberrhein
June 1944	Eisenhower; 6 Jun 1944; 8 May 1945	Montgomery; 6 Jun 1944; 8 May 1945			von Rundstedt; 6 Jun 1944; 2 Jul 1944	Rommel; 6 Jun 1944; 17 Jul 1944	Blaskowitz; 6 Jun 1944; 21 Sep 1944
July 1944	Eisenhower; 6 Jun 1944; 8 May 1945	Montgomery; 6 Jun 1944; 8 May 1945	Bradley; 14 Jul 1944; 8 May 1945		von Kluge; 2 Jul 1944; 16 Aug 1944	von Kluge; 19 Jul 1944; 17 Aug 1944	Blaskowitz; 6 Jun 1944; 21 Sep 1944
August 1944	Eisenhower; 6 Jun 1944; 8 May 1945	Montgomery; 6 Jun 1944; 8 May 1945	Bradley; 14 Jul 1944; 8 May 1945	Devers; 1 Aug 1944; 8 May 1945	Model; 16 Aug 1944; 3 Sep 1944	Model; 17 Aug 1944; 21 Apr 1945	Blaskowitz; 6 Jun 1944; 21 Sep 1944
September 1944	Eisenhower; 6 Jun 1944; 8 May 1945	Montgomery; 6 Jun 1944; 8 May 1945	Bradley; 14 Jul 1944; 8 May 1945	Devers; 1 Aug 1944; 8 May 1945	von Rundstedt; 3 Sep 1944; 11 Mar 1945	Model; 17 Aug 1944; 21 Apr 1945	Blaskowitz; 6 Jun 1944; 21 Sep 1944
October 1944	Eisenhower; 6 Jun 1944; 8 May 1945	Montgomery; 6 Jun 1944; 8 May 1945	Bradley; 14 Jul 1944; 8 May 1945	Devers; 1 Aug 1944; 8 May 1945	von Rundstedt; 3 Sep 1944; 11 Mar 1945	Model; 17 Aug 1944; 21 Apr 1945	Balck; 21 Sep 1944; 24 Dec 1944
November 1944	Eisenhower; 6 Jun 1944; 8 May 1945	Montgomery; 6 Jun 1944; 8 May 1945	Bradley; 14 Jul 1944; 8 May 1945	Devers; 1 Aug 1944; 8 May 1945	von Rundstedt; 3 Sep 1944; 11 Mar 1945	Model; 17 Aug 1944; 21 Apr 1945	Balck; 21 Sep 1944; 24 Dec 1944	Student; 1 Nov 1944; 28 Jan 1945
December 1944	Eisenhower; 6 Jun 1944; 8 May 1945	Montgomery; 6 Jun 1944; 8 May 1945	Bradley; 14 Jul 1944; 8 May 1945	Devers; 1 Aug 1944; 8 May 1945	von Rundstedt; 3 Sep 1944; 11 Mar 1945	Model; 17 Aug 1944; 21 Apr 1945	Balck; 21 Sep 1944; 24 Dec 1944	Student; 1 Nov 1944; 28 Jan 1945	Himmler; 10 Dec 1944; 23 Jan 1945; Hausser; 24 Jan 1945; 28 Jan 1945
January 1945	Eisenhower; 6 Jun 1944; 8 May 1945	Montgomery; 6 Jun 1944; 8 May 1945	Bradley; 14 Jul 1944; 8 May 1945	Devers; 1 Aug 1944; 8 May 1945	von Rundstedt; 3 Sep 1944; 11 Mar 1945	Model; 17 Aug 1944; 21 Apr 1945	Blaskowitz; 24 Dec 1944; 29 Jan 1945	Student; 1 Nov 1944; 28 Jan 1945	Himmler; 10 Dec 1944; 23 Jan 1945; Hausser; 24 Jan 1945; 28 Jan 1945
February 1945	Eisenhower; 6 Jun 1944; 8 May 1945	Montgomery; 6 Jun 1944; 8 May 1945	Bradley; 14 Jul 1944; 8 May 1945	Devers; 1 Aug 1944; 8 May 1945	von Rundstedt; 3 Sep 1944; 11 Mar 1945	Model; 17 Aug 1944; 21 Apr 1945	Hausser; 29 Jan 1945; 2 Apr 1945	Blaskowitz; 28 Jan 1945; 15 Apr 1945
March 1945	Eisenhower; 6 Jun 1944; 8 May 1945	Montgomery; 6 Jun 1944; 8 May 1945	Bradley; 14 Jul 1944; 8 May 1945	Devers; 1 Aug 1944; 8 May 1945	Kesselring; 11 Mar 1945; 8 May 1945	Model; 17 Aug 1944; 21 Apr 1945	Hausser; 29 Jan 1945; 2 Apr 1945	Blaskowitz; 28 Jan 1945; 15 Apr 1945
April 1945	Eisenhower; 6 Jun 1944; 8 May 1945	Montgomery; 6 Jun 1944; 8 May 1945	Bradley; 14 Jul 1944; 8 May 1945	Devers; 1 Aug 1944; 8 May 1945	Kesselring; 11 Mar 1945; 8 May 1945	Model; 17 Aug 1944; 21 Apr 1945	Schulz; 2 Apr 1945; 6 May 1945	Blaskowitz; 28 Jan 1945; 15 Apr 1945
May 1945	Eisenhower; 6 Jun 1944; 8 May 1945	Montgomery; 6 Jun 1944; 8 May 1945	Bradley; 14 Jul 1944; 8 May 1945	Devers; 1 Aug 1944; 8 May 1945	Kesselring; 11 Mar 1945; 8 May 1945		Schulz; 2 Apr 1945; 6 May 1945	Busch; 15 Apr 1945; 7 May 1945

- 12th Army Group Report of Operations Volume 1, 31 July 1945
- Georg Tessin (CDROM edition), Verbände und Truppen der deutschen Wehrmacht und der Waffen-SS im Zweiten Weltkrieg 1939-1945, Osnabrück: Biblio Verlag, 1967-1998 (17 volumes)
- Mary Williams (compiler), Chronology 1941-1945, Washington: GPO, 1994
- Steven Zaloga, Operation Nordwind 1945, Oxford: Osprey, 2010, ISBN 978-1-84603-683-5
