= List of World War II military units of Germany =

This is a list of German military units during World War II which contains all military units that served with the German Armed Forces (Wehrmacht).

Major units above corps level are listed here. For smaller units, see list of German corps in World War II and list of German divisions in World War II.

== Army commands (Oberbefehlshaber) ==
OB stands for Oberbefehlshaber or Supreme Command

- OB Niederlande – Netherlands – (7 April 1945 – 6 May 1945)
- OB Nord – North Reich – (2 May – 8 May 1945)
- OB Nordwest – Northwest Reich – (11 November 1944 – 4 May 1945)
- OB Ost (Oberost) – East – (3 October 1939 – 21 July 1940)
- OB Oberrhein – Upper Rhine – (26 November 1944 – 25 January 1945)
- OB Süd – Mediterranean and North African theatre – (2 December 1941 – 16 November 1943)
- OB Südost – Balkans and Greece – (1 January 1943 – 8 May 1945)
- OB Südwest – Italy – (21 November 1943 – 2 May 1945)
- OB West – France, Low countries, Western Germany – (10 October 1940 – 22 April 1945)

== Army groups ==
=== Heeresgruppen ===
- Army Group A
- Army Group B
- Army Group C
- Army Group D
- Army Group E (Heeresgruppe Löhr)
- Army Group F
- Army Group G
- Army Group H
- Army Group Africa (Heeresgruppe Afrika)
- Army Group Don
- Army Group Courland (Heeresgruppe Kurland))
- Army Group Liguria (Heeresgruppen Ligurien)
- Army Group Centre (Heeresgruppe Mitte)
- Army Group North (Heeresgruppe Nord)
- Army Group North Ukraine (Heeresgruppe Nordukraine)
- Army Group Upper Rhine (Heeresgruppe Oberrhein)
- Army Group South (Heeresgruppe Süd)
- Army Group South Ukraine (Heeresgruppe Südukraine)
- Army Group Tunisia (Heeresgruppe Tunis)
- Army Group Vistula (Heeresgruppe Weichsel)
- Army Group West – See OB West

=== Armeegruppen ===
These were temporary groupings of armies below the formal army group level.

- Panzer Group Guderian
- Panzer Group Kleist
- Army Group Weichs
- Army Group Ruoff
- Army Group Hoth
- Army Group Raus/Henrici
- Army Group Wöhler
- Army Group Fretter-Pico/Balck
- Army Group Student
- Army Group Antonescu
- Army Group Dumitrescu
- Army Group Ligurien
- Army Group Felber
- Army Group Frießner
- Army Group Blumentritt
- Army Group Steiner

== Armies (Armeeoberkommando) ==
- 1st Panzer Army
- 2nd Panzer Army
- 3rd Panzer Army
- 4th Panzer Army
- 5th Panzer Army
- 6th Panzer Army
- 1st Parachute Army
- 1st Army
- 2nd Army (as Armeeoberkommando Ostpreussen in 1945)
- 3rd Army
- 4th Army
- 5th Army
- 6th Army
- 7th Army
- 8th Army
- 9th Army
- 10th Army
- 11th Army
- 12th Army
- 14th Army
- 15th Army
- 16th Army
- 17th Army
- 18th Army
- 19th Army
- 20th Mountain Army
- 21st Army
- 24th Army
- 25th Army
- Panzer Army Africa (also known as the Deutsch-Italienische Panzer-Armee during 1942-43)
- Army East Prussia
- Lappland Army (redesignated as the 20th Mountain Army)
- Armeeoberkommando Norwegen

== Armored groups (Panzergruppe) ==
- 1st Panzer Group
- 2nd Panzer Group
- 3rd Panzer Group
- 4th Panzer Group
- Panzer Group Africa
- Panzer Group Guderian (see 2nd Panzer Group/2nd Panzer Army)
- Panzer Group Hoth (1940)
- Panzer Group Kleist (see 1st Panzer Group/1st Panzer Army)
- Panzer Group West (see 5th Panzer Army)

== See also ==
- List of Waffen SS units
