= List of German far-right periodicals (post-1945) =

This is a list of German far-right periodicals (post-1945). In post-World War II Germany, after the defeat of the Nazis and Nazi Germany, the far-right was outlawed by the Allied occupation forces, preventing political continuity of the Nazi Party in a new, post-war form. In West Germany, reformed far-right parties were able to reestablish a foot hold in the national parliament in the early years of the new Federal Republic, courtesy in part to the post-war issues the new country faced. With the recovery of the German economy, the Wirtschaftswunder, the far-right declined in appeal. The far-right, from the 1960s, was characterised by fragmentation and infighting. Following the German reunification, in the early 1990s, the far-right has regained strength and become more of a threat to the democratic Germany again.

In East Germany, a communist country, the far-right was declared extinct by the government despite the fact that a quarter of all members of the ruling communist party, in 1954, had formerly been members of the Nazi Party. Despite the official line, racism and far-right ideology existed and, towards the end of the country's existence in the late 1980s, increased. It was however swept under the carpet by the ruling authorities as ordinary violence and hooliganism rather than being allowed to be seen as a resurface of far-right ideology.

The German Federal Office for the Protection of the Constitution classifies the far-right (German: Rechtsextremismus) as a movement against the equality of all people as guaranteed by the German constitution, and as enemies of the democratic nature of the German state. Their aim is to establish an authoritarian state, modelled on the Führerprinzip. The far-right places undue value on race and ethnicity which results in xenophobia and racism. Antisemitism is a core principal of their ideology. Far-right publications generally glorify Germany's Nazi past and the armed forces of the era, the Wehrmacht and Waffen-SS, offering historically revisionist publications and attempting to promote the myth of the "Clean Wehrmacht" and "Clean Waffen-SS". Far-right publisher are however careful to not out-rightly deny or trivialise the Holocaust, this being a criminal offence in Germany, as many have been prosecuted for such offences in the past.

The German Federal Office for the Protection of the Constitution, as of 2017, classifies three political parties as far-right, the National Democratic Party of Germany (NPD), Die Rechte and Der III. Weg, with a combined membership of 6,050.

Historically, a small number of long-standing far-right newspapers and magazines have been published since the early 1950s, like the National Zeitung and Nation Europa, while a larger number of publications have only existed for a short duration. The pulp magazine Der Landser, which existed for almost 60 years, glorified the German armed forces and omit the war crimes committed by Wehrmacht and Waffen-SS, without providing any historical context and was eventually terminated after a complaint by the Simon Wiesenthal Center.

The far-right print media in Germany is predominantly organised in the Gesellschaft für freie Publizistik, GfP, the largest far-right association of publishers, authors and book sellers, which was formed by former SS officers and Nazi officials in 1960. The number of far-right publishers in Germany independent of political parties has declined from 45 in 2001 to 30 in 2016.

== Newspapers & magazines ==
Major far-right newspapers and magazines:

Name	Location	Est	Dis	Circulation	Published	Publisher	Notes	Ref
Der Freiwillige	Reinsfeld	1956	2014	5,000 (2006)	Two monthly	Munin Verlag	Central organ of the HIAG, a veterans organisation of the Waffen-SS, classified as revisionist and idolising the Waffen-SS Merged into DMZ Zeitgeschichte in 2014, which is published by Dietmar Munier	
Deutsche Geschichte	Gilching	1990	Active	10,000 (2016)	Two monthly	Verlagsgesellschaft Berg mbH	Produced by one of the largest independent far-right publishers in Germany, the periodical contains historical revisionist articles on military history	
Deutsche Militärzeitschrift Zeitgeschichte	Selent	2012	Active		Two monthly	Verlagsgruppe Lesen & Schenken	An offshoot of the Deutsche Militärzeitschrift, which caters for a more moderate readership, the Deutsche Militärzeitschrift Zeitgeschichte caters for the far-right, glorifying the Waffen-SS The publication absorbed the Waffen-SS veterans publication Der Freiwillige in 2014	
Deutsche Stimme	Riesa	1976	Active	21,000 (2007)	Monthly	Deutsche-Stimme-Verlag	Official party organ of the far-right National Democratic Party of Germany, classified as xenophobic, nationalistic and Antisemitic	
National Zeitung	Munich	1951	Active	38,000 (2007)	Weekly	DSZ Druckschriften- und Zeitungs-Verlag GmbH	Originally published as Deutsche Soldaten-Zeitung, renamed Deutsche National-Zeitung und Soldaten-Zeitung in 1961 and Deutsche National-Zeitung in 1963. Merged in 1999 with Deutscher Anzeiger to become National Zeitung. The Bavarian Office for the Protection of the Constitution classifies the National Zeitung as propagating a xenophobic, nationalist and revisionist world view Functioned as the semi-official party organ of the German People's Union, the DVU, with both controlled by Gerhard Frey	
Nation Europa	Coburg	1951	2009	18,000 (2007)	Monthly	Nation Europa Verlags GmbH	Purchased in 2009 by Dietmar Munier and replaced with Zuerst! In its final years closely associated with the far-right National Democratic Party of Germany, categorised by the Federal Office for the Protection of the Constitution as "the most significant organ of right-wing extremist theory and strategy"	
Junge Freiheit	Berlin	1986	Active	28,000 (2016)	Weekly	Junge Freiheit Verlag GmbH & Co. KG	Classified as right wing, bordering far-right, part of the Neue Rechte	
Zuerst!	Berlin	2010	Active		Monthly	Verlagsgruppe Lesen & Schenken	Successor to Nation Europa, self-declared right-wing with many far-right contributors and advertisers, published by Dietmar Munier	
