= Armeegruppe =

Historical type of formation of Germany

Armeegruppe was a historical type of major formation of German military history, in use in the Imperial German Army during World War I and the Wehrmacht during World War II.

While the term literally translates as army group, the German-language equivalent of an English-language army group is Heeresgruppe. Whereas a Heeresgruppe-type army group was designed to be permanent, an Armeegruppe-type army group was usually an ad hoc formation for a specific military task. Typically, Armeegruppe-type formations were short-lived.

Whereas Heeresgruppe-type formations were typically named after a geographic region (such as Heeresgruppe Courland), geographic direction (such as Heeresgruppe North) or even named by simple letters (such as Army Group A), Armeegruppe-type army groups were typically named after their commanding general, e.g. Army Group Steiner was named after Felix Steiner.

== Armeegruppe-type formations during World War I ==
- Army Group Beseler
- Army Group Gallwitz
- Army Group Gronau
- Army Group Marwitz
- Army Group Litzmann
- Army Group Eben

== Armeegruppe-type formations during World War II ==
=== Overview ===
The Wehrmacht of World War II was peculiar compared to the German army of World War I due to its much stronger inclusion of allied armed forces (such as the Royal Italian Army or Royal Hungarian Army), and Armeegruppe-type army groups were once again revived to serve as ad hoc combinations of an army-level command, typically German, which would take the lead, and a second army-level command, typically of another Axis country, which would be subordinate. Exceptions from this rule were Army Group Dumitrescu, when a non-German army (in this case 3rd Romanian Army) was superior to a German army (in this case 6th Army) and Army Group Felber, which was only of corps-strength and would typically have been referred to as a 'Gruppe' rather than 'Armeegruppe' if Wehrmacht precedent had been followed more closely. Additionally, Army Group G and Army Group Liguria were not named after commanders but instead after a letter or a region, respectively; Army Group G was later upgraded to Heeresgruppe-level.

=== List ===
German name	Translated name	Namesake of	Notes
Armeegruppe Antonescu	Army Group Antonescu	Ion Antonescu	German 11th Army, Romanian 3rd Army, Romanian 4th Army; invasion force from Romania during the early days of Operation Barbarossa (1941).
Armeegruppe Balck	Army Group Balck	Hermann Balck	Previously "Army Group Fretter-Pico" (see below); designation in early 1945 for German 6th Army and Hungarian 3rd Army.
Armeegruppe Blumentritt	Army Group Blumentritt	Günther Blumentritt	Formed in the final days of the war to oversee the German forces along the North Sea coast.
Armeegruppe Dumitrescu	Army Group Dumitrescu	Petre Dumitrescu	Union of Romanian 3rd Army and German 6th Army in April to July 1944.
Armeegruppe Fretter-Pico	Army Group Fretter-Pico	Maximilian Fretter-Pico	September 1944 designation; union of German 6th Army and Hungarian 2nd Army (November 1944: Hungarian 3rd Army); from January 1945 "Armeegruppe Balck" (see above).
Armeegruppe Felber	Army Group Felber	Hans Felber	Corps-size formation, restructured from LXXXIII Army Corps; 21 May 1942 – 26 August 1943; subsequently became 19th Army.
Armeegruppe Frießner	Army Group Frießner	Johannes Frießner	
Armeegruppe G	Army Group G	N/A	Union of German 1st Army and German 19th Army; became Heeresgruppe-type on 12 September 1944.
Armeegruppe Guderian	Army Group Guderian	Heinz Guderian	Alternative name for Panzer Group Guderian, which in turn was an alternate name for the strengthened 2nd Panzer Group, which in turn became the 2nd Panzer Army.
Armeegruppe Heinrici	Army Group Heinrici	Gotthard Heinrici	Union of German 1st Panzer Army and Hungarian 1st Army in the Carpathians, inserted on right wing of Army Group A (Josef Harpe). August/October 1944 and January 1945.
Armeegruppe Hoth	Army Group Hoth	Hermann Hoth	
Armeegruppe Ligurien	Army Group Liguria	N/A	
Armeegruppe Kleist	Army Group Kleist	Ewald von Kleist	Alternative name for Panzer Group Kleist.
Armeegruppe Raus	Army Group Raus	Erhard Raus	
Armeegruppe Ruoff	Army Group Ruoff	Richard Ruoff	
Armeegruppe Steiner	Army Group Steiner	Felix Steiner	Formed in the final days of the war in the vicinity of Berlin to assist during the Battle of Berlin.
Armeegruppe Student	Army Group Student	Kurt Student	
Armeegruppe Weichs	Army Group Weichs	Maximilian von Weichs	
Armeegruppe Wöhler	Army Group Wöhler	Otto Wöhler	
