= Waffen-SS im Einsatz =

1953 book by Paul Hausser

Waffen-SS in Action
- Author: Paul Hausser
- Original title: Waffen-SS im Einsatz
- Language: German
- Genre: War story; Historical revisionism
- Publisher: Plesse Verlag
- Publication date: 1953
- Publication place: West Germany
- Media type: Print
- Followed by: Soldiers Like Any Other

Waffen-SS im Einsatz (Waffen-SS in Action) is a 1953 book in German by Paul Hausser, a former high-ranking SS commander and a leader of the Waffen-SS lobby group HIAG. As part of the organisation's historical-negationist agenda, it advanced the idea of the purely military role of the Waffen-SS.

The first major work by one of the HIAG leaders, it was published by Plesse Verlag, owned by a right-wing politician and publisher Waldemar Schütz. Hausser's book, along with those by other key HIAG members Felix Steiner and Kurt Meyer, has been characterised by the historian Charles Sydnor as one of the "most important works of [Waffen-SS] apologist literature."

== Background ==
From 1950, Hausser was active in HIAG, a historical-negationist organization and a lobby group of former Waffen-SS members. HIAG began in late 1950 as a loose association of local groups; by October 1951, it claimed to have 376 local branches. In December 1951, Hausser became its first spokesperson.

As part of its lobbying efforts, HIAG attempted to advance the idea of the Waffen-SS being the "fourth branch of the Wehrmacht" and in no way connected to the crimes of the regime. HIAG's rewriting of history included significant multi-prong propaganda efforts, including tendentious periodicals, books and public speeches, along with a publishing house – Munin Verlag – to serve as a platform for its publicity aims. The express aim of Munin Verlag was to publish the "war narratives" of former Waffen-SS members, in cooperation with HIAG.

== Contents ==
British military historian Keith Simpson in his book Waffen SS quotes Hausser for writing that, he "hoped the work would disperse the lies and calumnies which had formed themselves around the Waffen-SS and help to give this courageous formation its place." The book had an unmistakable connection to the Nazi origins of the Waffen-SS: the SS runes on the cover art and the SS motto ("my honor is my loyalty") embossed on the cloth cover. A foreword from the former Wehrmacht general Heinz Guderian provided an endorsement for the Waffen-SS troops and referred to them as "the first realization of the European idea".

The book described the growth of Waffen-SS into a so-called multinational force where foreign volunteers fought heroically as a "militant example of the great European idea". Historians have refuted this characterisation, arguing that it was largely Nazi propaganda employed to bolster the ranks of the Waffen-SS with foreign volunteers. The message was later repurposed by HIAG as it sought historical and legal rehabilitation of the force.

Hausser wrote another book, published in 1966 by HIAG's imprint Munin Verlag, under the title Soldaten wie andere auch ("Soldiers Like Any Other"). According to the military historian S.P. MacKenzie, the work epitomised how HIAG leaders wanted the Waffen-SS to be remembered, while the historian Charles Sydnor described it as "equally tendentious".

== Reception ==
Waffen-SS in Action was included in the index of objectionable war books maintained by West Germany's Federal Department for Media Harmful to Young Persons. The index was created in the early 1960s to limit the sale of such works to minors due to their chauvinism and glorification of violence.

Hausser's books, along with those by other key HIAG members and former Waffen-SS generals Felix Steiner and Kurt Meyer, have been characterised by the historian Charles Sydnor as the "most important works of [Waffen-SS] apologist literature." These works demanded rehabilitation of the military branch of the Nazi Party and presented Waffen-SS members as both victims and misunderstood heroes.

== See also ==
- Waffen-SS in popular culture
- Waffen-SS historical revisionism
