= Bernhard Siebken =

German SS commander (1910–1949)

- HIAG members laying a wreath at Siebken's grave in 1959; photo originally appeared in HIAG's periodical Der Freiwillige ("The Volunteer")
- Born: 4 April 1910; Pinneberg, Province of Schleswig-Holstein, Kingdom of Prussia, German Empire
- Died: 20 January 1949 (aged 38); Hamelin Prison, Hamelin, Allied-occupied Germany
- Cause of death: Execution by hanging
- Military career
- Allegiance: Nazi Germany
- Branch: Schutzstaffel; Waffen-SS
- Service years: 1931–1945
- Rank: SS-Obersturmbannführer
- Service number: NSDAP #558,752; SS #44,894
- Units: SS Division Leibstandarte; SS Division Hitlerjugend
- Commands: SS-Panzergrenadier-Regiment 2 "LSSAH"
- Conflicts: World War II
- Awards: Knight's Cross of the Iron Cross

Bernhard Siebken (4 April 1910 – 20 January 1949) was a German SS commander during World War II and a convicted war criminal. He was sentenced to death for the killing of Canadian prisoners of war and was executed in 1949.

== Life ==
Siebken, a driving and riding instructor, joined the SS and the NSDAP in 1931 and was one of the original members of the SS-Stabswache (March 1933) and its successor the Leibstandarte SS Adolf Hitler (LSSAH). He took part in the invasion of Poland in 1939 and went on to serve on the Eastern Front.

In 1944, Seibken commanded the 2nd Battalion, 26th SS Panzer Grenadier Regiment and later the 25th SS Panzer Grenadier Regiment; both with the SS Division Hitlerjugend. Siebken was awarded the Knight's Cross of the Iron Cross on 17 April 1945.

After the end of the war, he stood trial for war crimes related to his activities while in command of the 2nd Battalion, 26th Panzer Grenadier Regiment of the LSSAH.

== Death ==
He was found guilty in the shootings of Canadian prisoners of war from the Queen's Own Rifles during the Battle of Le Mesnil-Patry and hanged on 20 January 1949. The death sentence and its execution were very controversial at the time: the British war correspondent Basil Liddell Hart, among others, spoke out against what he considered to be an unjust sentence.

Following the reburial of executed war criminals in Hamelin in 1954, the cemetery became the focal point for veterans' reunions, with distinct Nazi overtones. In 1959, for example, the convention of the lobby group and revisionist organisation of former Waffen-SS members, HIAG, concluded with "comrades gathering around [Siebken's] tomb" and laying a wreath.

== Awards (excerpt) ==
- Honour Chevron for the Old Guard in February 1934
- SS Honour Sword
- SS Honour Ring
- SS-Julleuchter in December 1935
- Anschluss Medal
- Sudetenland Medal
- Iron Cross (1939), 2nd and 1st Class
- War Merit Cross (1939), 2nd and 1st Class
- Order of the Crown of Romania, Officer's Cross with Swords on 16 July 1942
- Eastern Medal
- Knight's Cross of the Iron Cross on 17 April 1945 as SS-Obersturmbannführer and commander of the SS-Panzergrenadier-Regiment 2 "Leibstandarte SS Adolf Hitler"
