= Paul Hausser =

German SS commander (1880–1972)

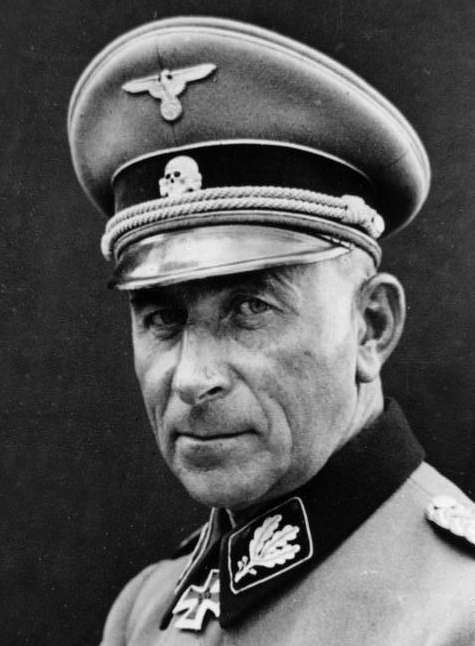
- Hausser in 1941
- Born: 7 October 1880; Brandenburg an der Havel, Brandenburg, German Empire
- Died: 21 December 1972 (aged 92); Ludwigsburg, Baden-Württemberg, West Germany
- Burial place: Munich Waldfriedhof
- Other name: Paul Falk
- Spouse: Elisabeth Gerard (m. 1912–1972)
- Children: 1
- Military career
- Allegiance: German Empire; Weimar Republic; Nazi Germany
- Branch: Imperial German Army; Prussian Army; Reichswehr; Schutzstaffel; Waffen-SS
- Service years: 1892–1932; 1934–1945
- Rank: Generalleutnant; SS-Oberst-Gruppenführer und Generaloberst der Waffen-SS
- Nickname: Papa
- Service number: NSDAP #4,138,779; SS #239,795
- Commands: SS Division Das Reich; II SS Panzer Corps; Seventh Army; Army Group Upper Rhine; Army Group G
- Conflicts: World War I; Eastern Front; World War II; Invasion of Poland; Battle of France; Balkans Campaign; Invasion of Yugoslavia; Eastern Front; Third Battle of Kharkov; Battle of Kursk; Battle of Normandy; Falaise Pocket
- Awards: Knight's Cross of the Iron Cross with Oak Leaves and Swords
- Other work: Founder of HIAG, Waffen-SS lobby group

Paul Hausser, also known by his birth name Paul Falk post war (7 October 1880 – 21 December 1972), was a German general and, together with Sepp Dietrich, one of the two highest ranking commanders in the Waffen-SS. He played a key role in the post-war revisionist efforts by former members of the Waffen-SS to achieve historical and legal rehabilitation.

Hausser served as an officer in the Prussian Army during World War I and attained the rank of general in the inter-war Reichsheer. After retirement, he joined the SS and was instrumental in forming the Waffen-SS. During World War II, he rose to the level of army group commander. He led Waffen-SS troops in the Third Battle of Kharkov, the Battle of Kursk and the Normandy Campaign.

After the war, he became a founding member and the first spokesperson of HIAG, a lobby group and a negationist veterans' organisation, founded by former high-ranking Waffen-SS personnel in West Germany in 1951. It campaigned for the restoration of legal and economic rights of the Waffen-SS employing a multi-prong propaganda campaign to achieve its aims.

Hausser wrote two books, arguing the purely military role of the Waffen-SS and advancing the notion that its troops were "soldiers like any other", according to the title of the second book. Under Hausser's leadership, HIAG reshaped the image of the Waffen-SS as a so-called pan-European force that fought honorably and had no part in war crimes or Nazi atrocities. These notions have been rejected by mainstream historians.

== Early life and military career ==
Hausser was born on 7 October 1880 in Brandenburg an der Havel into a Prussian military family and entered the army in 1892. In 1899, he graduated from a cadet academy and was commissioned as a lieutenant in the 155th (7th West Prussian) Infantry Regiment. Hausser graduated from the Prussian Military Academy in Berlin in 1911. Hausser married Elisabeth Gerard in 1912; the couple had one daughter, who was born in December 1913. They remained married until his death in 1972.

During World War I, he served in the German General Staff and in staff roles on the Eastern Front, primarily serving with the 109th Infantry Division between 1916 and 1918. He was promoted to major in 1918 and was retained in the postwar Reichswehr, reaching the rank of Oberst (colonel) by 1927.

Hausser retired from the Reichswehr in 1932 with the rank of Generalleutnant, having filled various appointments including chief of staff of Wehrkreis II (Military District 2) in Stettin, commander of the 10th Infantry Regiment, and deputy commander of the 4th Infantry Division. Hausser joined the right-wing World War I veterans' organization Der Stahlhelm, becoming the head of its Brandenburg-Berlin chapter in 1933. Soon after, the Stahlhelm was incorporated into the Sturmabteilung (SA), and, with the SA's demise, into the SS.

== SS career ==
In November 1934, Hausser was transferred to the SS-Verfügungstruppe (SS Dispositional Troops; SS-VT) and assigned to the SS-Junkerschule Bad Tölz. He became the Inspector of the SS-VT in 1936. In this role, Hausser was in charge of the troop's military and ideological training but did not have command authority. The decision on deployment of the troops remained in Heinrich Himmler's hands. This aligned with Hitler's intentions to maintain these troops exclusively at his disposal, "neither [a part] of the army, nor of the police", according to Hitler's order of 17 August 1938.

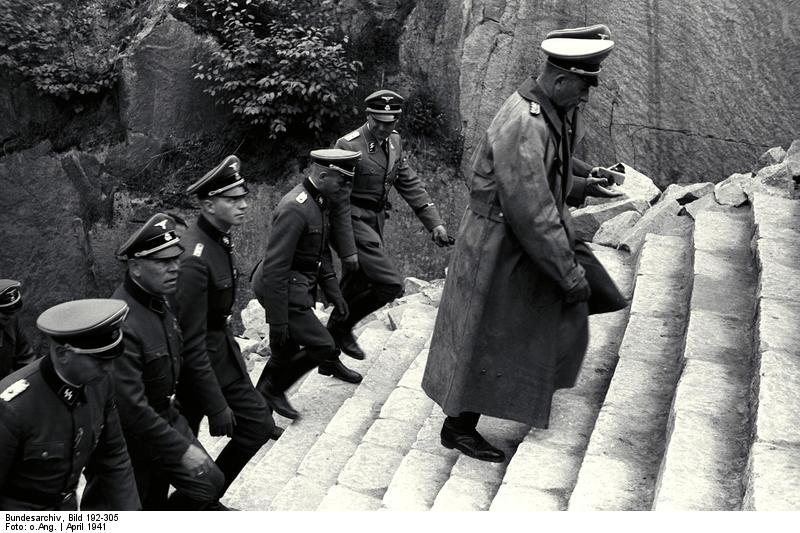
Paul Hausser (far right, in overcoat) walking up the Stairs of Death at the Mauthausen-Gusen concentration camp, April 1941

Hausser served during the 1939 invasion of Poland as an observer with the mixed Wehrmacht/SS Panzer Division Kempf. In October 1939 the SS-VT was formed as a motorized infantry division known as the SS-Verfügungs-Division with Hausser in command. He led the division, later renamed 2nd SS Division Das Reich, through the French campaign of 1940 and in the early stages of Operation Barbarossa. For his service in the Soviet Union, Hausser was awarded the Knight's Cross of the Iron Cross in 1941 and the Oak Leaves in 1943 (he received the Swords for his service in Normandy). He was severely wounded, losing an eye.

After recovering, he commanded the newly formed SS-Panzer Corps (renamed II SS Panzer Corps in June 1943) and against Hitler's explicit orders withdrew his troops from Kharkov to avoid encirclement. He led the 1st, 2nd and 3rd SS divisions during the Battle of Kursk. After Kursk, his Corps was re-formed (substituting the 1st, 2nd and 3rd SS Panzer Divisions with the 9th and 10th SS divisions) and sent to Italy, then to France where he commanded them in the early stages of the Normandy Campaign.

After the death of Friedrich Dollmann, commander of the Seventh Army, Hausser was promoted to its command. During the Falaise encirclement in 1944, Hausser was seriously wounded (shot through the jaw). Hausser was promoted to SS-Oberst-Gruppenführer in August 1944 and subsequently commanded Army Group Upper Rhine and later Army Group G until 3 April 1945. On the day he was relieved, Joseph Goebbels wrote, "He has definitely not stood the test." He ended the war on the staff of Field Marshal Albert Kesselring. At the Nuremberg Trials, he claimed that the Waffen-SS only had a military role and denied that it was involved in war crimes and atrocities.

== Post-war activities ==
=== Work for U.S. Army Historical Division ===
Following the war, Hausser participated in the work of the U.S. Army Historical Division, where, under the guidance of Franz Halder, German generals wrote World War II operational studies for the U.S. Army, first as POWs and then as employees. In the late 1940s, Hausser authored an operational study on the Seventh Army's response to the Allied Normandy breakout. The study, together with contributions from Rudolf Christoph von Gersdorff, Heinrich Freiherr von Lüttwitz, Wilhelm Fahrmbacher and Heinrich Eberbach, was published in 2004 as Fighting the Breakout: The German Army in Normandy from COBRA to the Falaise Gap.

=== Leader of Waffen-SS lobby group ===
From 1950, Hausser was active in HIAG, a revisionist organization and a lobby group of former Waffen-SS members. HIAG began in late 1950 as a loose association of local groups; by October 1951, however, it claimed to embrace 376 local branches across West Germany. In December 1951, Hausser became its first spokesperson.

With the publication of its first periodical in late 1951, HIAG was beginning to draw attention to itself and generate public controversy, including speculation that it was a neo-Nazi organization. In response, Hausser wrote an open letter to the Bundestag denying these accusations and describing the HIAG as an advocacy organisation for former Waffen-SS troops. Hausser asserted that its members rejected all forms of radicalism and were "upstanding citizens".

As part of its lobbying efforts, HIAG attempted to "manipulate historical record or simply to ignore it", according to the historian David C. Large, who studied HIAG in the 1980s. HIAG's rewriting of history included significant multi-prong propaganda efforts, including tendentious periodicals, books and public speeches, along with the publishing house of Munin Verlag, to serve as a platform for its publicity aims. The express aim of Munin Verlag was to publish the "war narratives" of former Waffen-SS members, in cooperation with HIAG.

=== Memoirs ===
Paul Hausser's 1953 book Waffen-SS im Einsatz ("Waffen-SS in Action") was the first major work by one of the HIAG leaders. It was published by Plesse Verlag, owned by a right-wing politician and publisher Waldemar Schütz. A foreword from the former Wehrmacht General Heinz Guderian provided an endorsement for the Waffen-SS troops and referred to them as "the first realization of the European idea".

The book described the growth of Waffen-SS into a multinational force where foreign volunteers fought heroically as a "militant example of the great European idea". Historians have refuted this characterisation, arguing that it was largely Nazi propaganda employed to bolster the ranks of the Waffen-SS with foreign volunteers. The message was later repurposed by HIAG as it sought historical and legal rehabilitation of the force. Waffen-SS in Action was included in the index of objectionable war books maintained by West Germany's Federal Department for Media Harmful to Young Persons. The index was created in the early 1960s to limit the sale of such works to minors due to their chauvinism and glorification of violence.

Hausser later wrote another book, published in 1966 by HIAG's imprint Munin Verlag, under the title Soldaten wie andere auch ("Soldiers Like Any Other"). According to the military historian S.P. MacKenzie, the work epitomised how HIAG leaders wanted the Waffen-SS to be remembered, while the historian Charles Sydnor described it as "equally tendentious".

Hausser's books, along with those by other key HIAG members and former Waffen-SS Generals Felix Steiner and Kurt Meyer, have been characterised by the historian Charles Sydnor as the "most important works of [Waffen-SS] apologist literature." These works demanded rehabilitation of the military branch of the Nazi Party and presented Waffen-SS members as both victims and misunderstood heroes.

== Historical revisionism ==
By the mid-1950s, under Hausser's guidance, HIAG attempted to establish a position that separated the Waffen-SS from other SS formations and shifted responsibility for crimes that could not be denied to the Allgemeine-SS (security and police), the SS-Totenkopfverbände (concentration camp organisation, "Death's Head troops") and the Einsatzgruppen (mobile killing units). The Waffen-SS, according to this position, could thus be successfully integrated into the parallel myth of the clean Wehrmacht.

Hausser continued to deny that there was any connection between the Waffen-SS and Nazi atrocities. In 1957, he wrote an open letter in Der Freiwillige, HIAG's official publication, to West Germany's minister of defence, stating that Death's Head troops "merely served as external guards in the concentration camps without the possibility of interfering with the internal procedure". He did not mention that the guards accompanied prisoners on external labor details and that commanders of concentration camps generally came from the Waffen-SS. This apologist position also ignored the fact that the organizational structure of the SS tied the Waffen-SS to the Nazi annihilation machine through transfer of personnel between various SS units and the shifting responsibilities of the units themselves, as they may perform frontline duties at one time and then be reassigned to "pacification actions", the Nazi term for punitive operations in the rear.

The German historian Karsten Wilke, who wrote a book on HIAG, Die "Hilfsgemeinschaft auf Gegenseitigkeit" (HIAG) 1950–1990: Veteranen der Waffen-SS in der Bundesrepublik ("HIAG 1950–1990: Waffen-SS veterans in the Federal Republic"), notes that, by the 1970s, HIAG attained a monopoly on the historical representation of the Waffen-SS. Its recipe was simple and contained just four ingredients:

- The Waffen-SS was apolitical
- It was elite
- It was innocent of all war crimes or Nazi atrocities
- It was a European army par excellence, the Army of Europe.

Historians dismiss, and even ridicule, HIAG's characterization. The French author Jean-Paul Picaper labels it as a "self-panegyric", while David Clay Large uses the words "extravagant fantasies about [Waffen-SS's] past and future". The historian James M. Diehl describes HIAG's claims of the Waffen-SS being the "fourth branch of the Wehrmacht" as "false", and HIAG's insistence that the force was a precursor to NATO as "even more outrageous".

Hausser's last project within HIAG was the five-hundred page SS picture tome under the nostalgic title Wenn alle Brüder schweigen ("When All Our Brothers Are Silent"); the project was spearheaded by Hausser, along with convicted Nazi war criminal Joachim Peiper, another prominent Waffen-SS figure, as a contributor. The publication was released in 1973.

Hausser died at the age of 92, on 21 December 1972 at Ludwigsburg.

== Summary of his military and SS career ==
=== Dates of rank ===
- Leutnant: 20 March 1899
- Oberleutnant: 19 August 1909
- Hauptmann i.G.: 1 March 1914 (Patent from 1 October 1913)
- Major: 22 March 1918
- Oberstleutnant: 1 April 1923 (Patent from 15 November 1922)
- Oberst: 1 November 1927 (RDA from 1 July 1927)
- Generalmajor: 1 February 1931
- Charakter als Generalleutnant: 31 January 1932
- SA-Standartenführer SAR: 1 March 1934
- SS-Standartenführer: 15 November 1934 (RDA from 1 November 1934)
- SS-Oberführer: 1 July 1935
- SS-Brigadeführer: 22 May 1936
- SS-Gruppenführer: 1 June 1938
- Generalleutnant der Waffen-SS: 19 November 1940
- SS-Obergruppenführer und General der Waffen-SS: 1 October 1941
- SS-Oberst-Gruppenführer und Generaloberst der Waffen-SS: 1 August 1944

=== Decorations ===
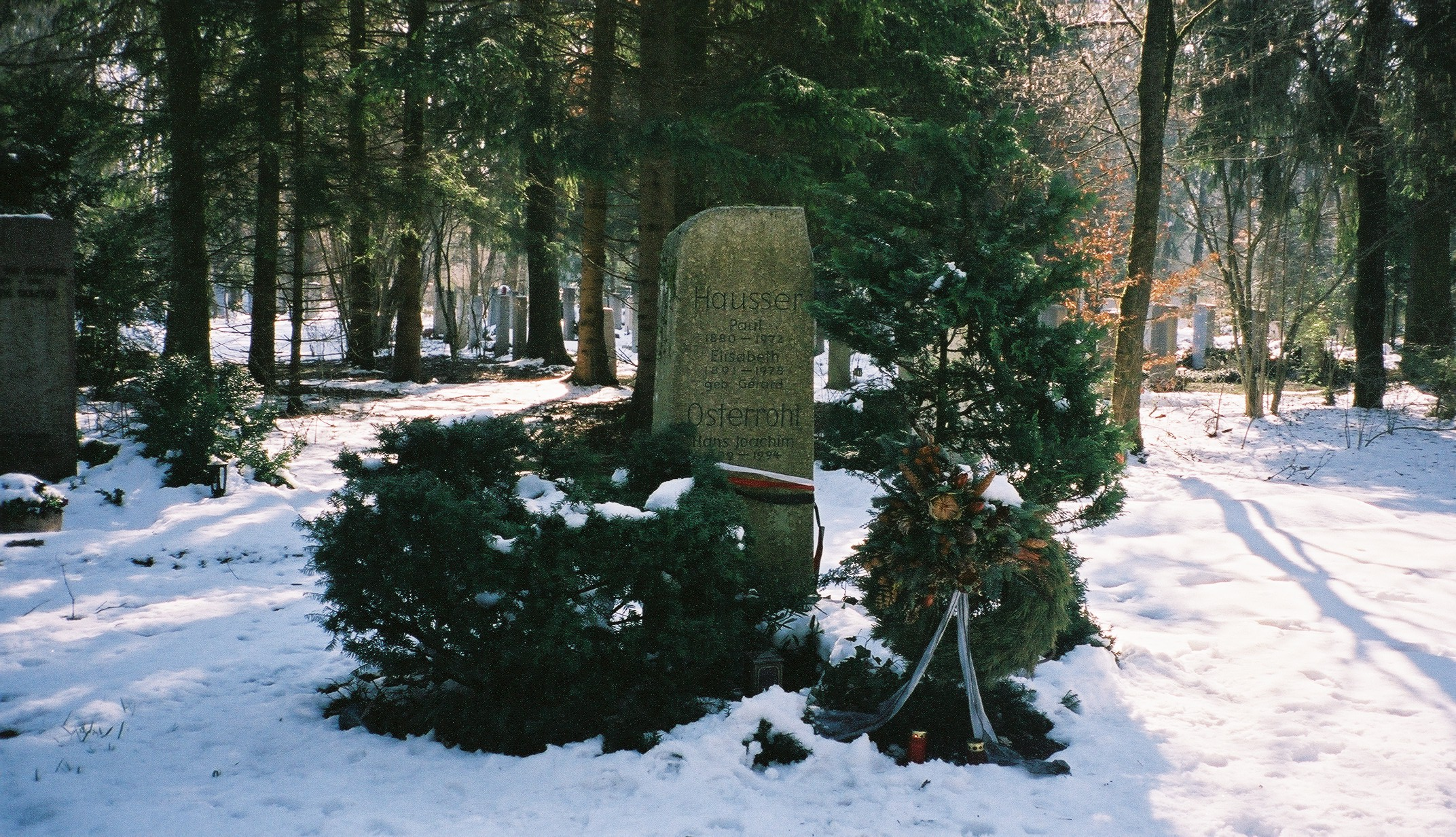
Grave of Paul Hausser

- Iron Cross (1914) 2nd and 1st Class
- Bavarian Military Merit Order 4th Class with Swords
- Saxon Albert Order 1st Class with Swords
- Württemberg Friedrich Order 1st Class with Swords
- Anhalt Friedrich Cross
- Prussian House Order of Hohenzollern, Knight's Cross with Swords
- Austrian Order of the Iron Crown 3rd Class with war decoration (11 July 1918)
- Wound Badge in Silver (9 May 1942)
- Clasp to the Iron Cross (2nd Class & 1st Class)
- Knight's Cross of the Iron Cross with Oak Leaves and Swords
  - Knight's Cross on 8 August 1941 as commander of SS Division Das Reich
  - Oak Leaves on 28 July 1943 as commanding general of the SS Panzer Corps
  - Swords on 26 August 1944 as commander of the 7th Army

== Works ==
Hausser authored two books:

- Waffen-SS im Einsatz (Waffen SS in Action), Plesse Verlag: Göttingen (1953)
- Soldaten wie andere auch (Soldiers Like Any Other), Munin Verlag: Osnabrück (1966)

Hausser's operational study on the 7th Army is included in the following volume:

- Fighting the Breakout: The German Army in Normandy from COBRA to the Falaise Gap (contributor) (2004). Mechanicsburg, PA: Stackpole Books. ISBN 978-1-85367-584-3

Military offices
Preceded by none	Commander of SS Division Das Reich; 19 October 1939 – 14 October 1941	Succeeded by SS-Obergruppenführer Wilhelm Bittrich
Preceded by none	Commander of II SS Panzer Corps; 14 September 1942 – 28 June 1944	Succeeded by SS-Obergruppenführer Wilhelm Bittrich
Preceded by Generaloberst Friedrich Dollmann	Commander of 7th Army; 28 June 1944 – 20 August 1944	Succeeded by General der Panzertruppe Heinrich Eberbach
Preceded by Reichsführer-SS Heinrich Himmler	Commander of Army Group Oberrhein; 23 January 1945 – 24 January 1945	Succeeded by none
Preceded by Generaloberst Johannes Blaskowitz	Commander of Army Group G 29 January 1945 – 2 April 1945	Succeeded by General der Infanterie Friedrich Schulz
