= Hubert Meyer =

German SS officer (1913–2012)

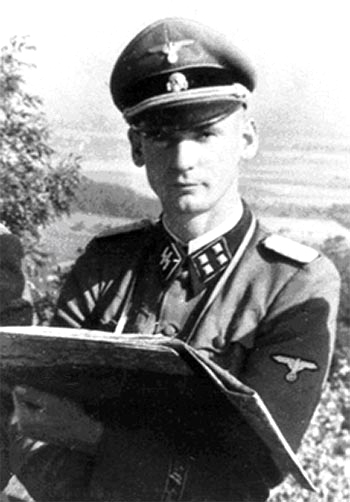
- Born: 5 December 1913
- Died: 16 November 2012 (aged 98)
- Known for: Chairman of HIAG, Waffen-SS lobby group
- SS career
- Allegiance: Nazi Germany
- Branch: Waffen-SS
- Service years: 1933–1945
- Rank: SS-Obersturmbannführer
- Commands: SS Division Hitlerjugend
- Conflicts: World War II

Hubert Meyer (5 December 1913 – 16 November 2012) was a German SS commander during the Nazi era and a post-war activist. In World War II, Meyer served in the Waffen-SS and had junior postings with the Leibstandarte SS Adolf Hitler; he briefly commanded the SS Division Hitlerjugend in 1944. After the war, he became active in HIAG, a Waffen-SS negationist lobby group, and was HIAG's last chairman before the group dissolved in 1992.

== SS career ==
Born in 1913, Meyer joined the SS in 1933; in 1937 Meyer was posted to Leibstandarte SS Adolf Hitler (LSSAH). He took part in the invasion of Poland, invasion of the Netherlands and invasion of France, and Operation Barbarossa. In February 1943 Meyer was given command of a regiment and participated in the Third Battle of Kharkov. He was awarded the German Cross in Gold on 6 May 1943. In September 1943 Meyer graduated from the General Staff Officer course and was assigned to the 12th SS Panzer Division Hitlerjugend. After the divisional commander Kurt Meyer was captured on 6 September 1944, Hubert Meyer took temporary command of the division until 24 October 1944.

In the years after the war, Meyer "repeatedly took part in battlefield studies with British, Canadian and United States veterans in Normandy and the Ardennes."

== Activities with HIAG ==
Starting in the 1950s, Meyer was active in HIAG, a negationist lobby group founded by former high-ranking Waffen-SS members in 1951 in West Germany. Meyer was HIAG's last president before the organization was dissolved in 1992.

== The divisional history ==
Over a period of 14 years, Meyer wrote a two volume book: Kriegsgeschichte der 12 SS-Panzerdivision "Hitlerjugend", which was published by Munin Verlag in 1982. (Munin Verlag^{[de]} was owned by HIAG.) "Many surviving soldiers of this Division, of all ranks, have collaborated in producing this book." The book used both German, British, Canadian and United States Army war diaries. Meyer tried to be objective, but was nevertheless selective in the way he presented his division. The book is rich in terms of historical material. The book was described as "very good and clearly recommended", and praised for the "very thorough research in the records of casualties suffered by the division". The two volumes were translated into English and published as a single hardback volume in 1994 as The History of the 12.SS-Panzerdivision Hitlerjugend by J.J. Fedorowicz Publishing. It was issued in two paperback volumes by Stackpole Books in 2005 as The 12th SS: The History of the Hitler Youth Panzer Division. The Fedorowicz edition is 401 pages long (not including 20 page map book). The Stackpole editions are 580 and 604 pages long. They have the same content, except that the Stackpole edition does not have Appendix 5 of the Fedorowicz edition, and the Stackpole edition's Appendices 5 and 6 are the Fedorowicz edition's Appendices 6 and 7.

Military offices
Preceded by SS-Brigadeführer Kurt Meyer	Commander of 12th SS Panzer Division Hitlerjugend; 6 September 1944 – 24 October 1944	Succeeded by SS-Brigadeführer Fritz Kraemer
