= 3rd Marine Infantry Division "San Marco" =

- 3ª Divisione fanteria di marina "San Marco"
- Active: 26 November 1943 - 30 April 1945
- Country: Italian Social Republic
- Branch: National Republican Army
- Type: Marines
- Size: 14,000 men
- Part of: Army Group Liguria
- Patron: Saint Mark
- Engagements: World War II: Italian campaign; Gothic Line; Spring 1945 offensive in Italy

Commanders
- Notable commanders: Amilcare Farina

The 3rd Marine Infantry Division "San Marco" (Italian: 3ª Divisione fanteria di marina "San Marco") was one of four divisions raised by the National Republican Army of the Italian Social Republic. It existed from 26 November 1943 until 29 April 1945.

== History ==
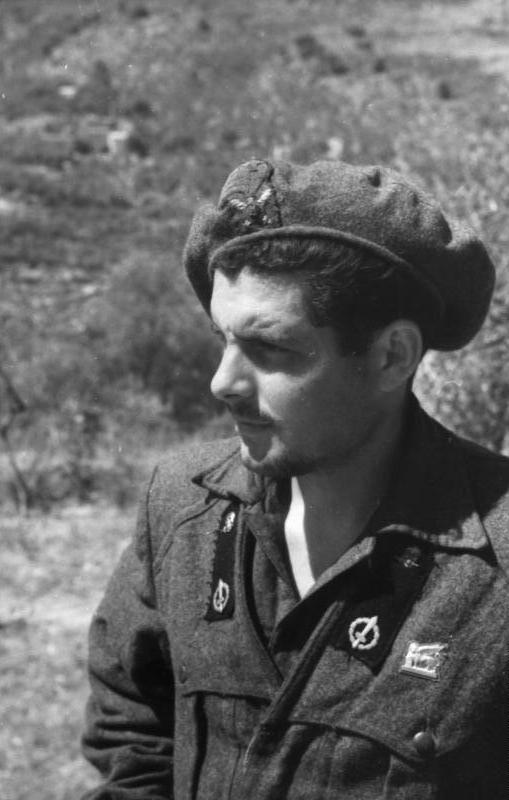
Soldier of 3rd Regiment San Marco of Italian Social Republic

The Division was formed from former Italian personnel and new conscripts from Northern Italy. The Division was trained in Germany and was ready for combat in July 1944. It was named for Saint Mark, historically the patron of Venice and the Veneto.

The 14,000 men strong Division was then sent to Liguria and was from July to October 1944, part of the Army Group Liguria under Marshal Graziani. It made defensive preparations against a possible Allied landing and was also engaged in anti-partisan operations.

Unlike the Monterosa Division which was sent to fight against the Americans at the Gothic Line, most of the San Marco Division remained in Liguria for the rest of the war fighting partisans. In August 1944 a unit was sent to France to fight against the Allies near Toulon, and two battalions were deployed along the Gothic Line to reinforce the Italian-German defence.

In Liguria, many soldiers of the Division deserted, and some 2,000 men were killed or wounded in the actions against the partisans.

On 24 April 1945 General Farina received the order to retreat from Liguria to the Ticino-Po line.

The San Marco Division crossed the Po River and surrendered to the Allies at Mede, Lombardy on 29 April 1945.

== Commanders ==
- General Aldo Princivalle : November 1943 - August 1944,
- General Amilcare Farina : August 1944 - April 1945

== Sources ==
- San Marco Naval Infantry Division Flames of War
- Axis history
