= HIAG =

20th-century pro-Waffen-SS lobbying group in West Germany

- Mutual Aid Association of Former Waffen-SS Members
- Hilfsgemeinschaft auf Gegenseitigkeit der Angehörigen der ehemaligen Waffen-SS
- Successor: Kriegsgräberstiftung "Wenn alle Brüder schweigen"
- Formation: 1951; 75 years ago
- Founded at: Bonn, West Germany
- Dissolved: 1992; 34 years ago
- Purpose: Legal, economic and historical rehabilitation of the Waffen-SS
- Methods: Lobbying; Historical negationism
- Members: 20,000 (1960s est.)
- Key people: Herbert Gille... and many others: Felix Steiner; Sepp Dietrich; Otto Kumm; Kurt Meyer; Paul Hausser; Wilhelm Bittrich; Erich Kern; Hubert Meyer
- Publication: Der Freiwillige (transl. 'The volunteer')

HIAG (German: Hilfsgemeinschaft auf Gegenseitigkeit der Angehörigen der ehemaligen Waffen-SS, lit. 'Mutual Aid Association of Former Waffen-SS Members') was a lobby group and a denialist veterans' organisation founded by former high-ranking Waffen-SS personnel in West Germany in 1951. Its main objective was to achieve legal, economic, and historical rehabilitation of the Waffen-SS.

To achieve these aims, the organisation used contacts with political parties, and employed multi-prong historical negationism and propaganda efforts, including periodicals, books, and public speeches. A HIAG-owned publishing house, Munin Verlag, served as a platform for its publicity. This extensive body of work, 57 book titles and more than 50 years of monthly periodicals, has been described by historians as revisionist apologia.

Always in touch with its members' Nazi past, HIAG was a subject of significant controversy, both in West Germany and abroad. The organisation drifted into open far-right extremism in its later history; it disbanded in 1992 at the federal level, but local groups continue to exist into the 21st century. Its monthly periodical, Der Freiwillige, survived until 2014. While HIAG only partially achieved its goals of legal and economic rehabilitation of the Waffen-SS, its propaganda efforts led to the reshaping of the image of the Waffen-SS in popular culture.

== Background ==
In the years following World War II, the Allied occupational authorities in Germany implemented policies which included demilitarisation, denazification, democratisation and decentralisation. The Allies' attempts were often perceived by the occupied population as "victors' justice" and met with limited success. For those in the Western occupation zones, the beginning of the Cold War further undermined these policies by reviving the idea of the necessity to fight against Soviet communism, echoing an aspect of Hitler's foreign policy. In 1950, after the outbreak of the Korean War, it became clear to the United States that German armed forces would need to be reconstituted. Former German officers used the changing political and military situation as leverage to demand the rehabilitation of the Wehrmacht. In October 1950, a group of former senior officers produced a document, which became known as the "Himmerod memorandum", for West German chancellor Konrad Adenauer. It included the demands that German war criminals be released and that the "defamation" of the German soldiers, including the Waffen-SS personnel, cease, which Adenauer worked to implement.

To accommodate the West German government, the Allies commuted a number of sentences for war crimes. A public declaration by Supreme Allied Commander Dwight D. Eisenhower followed in January 1951, distinguishing "between the regular German soldier and officer and Hitler and his criminal group... The fact that certain individuals committed in war dishonorable and despicable acts reflects on the individuals concerned and not on the great majority of German soldiers and officers." The same year, some former career officers of the Wehrmacht were granted war pensions. Unlike the Wehrmacht, the SS had been deemed a criminal organisation at the Nuremberg trials and could thus act as an "alibi of a nation" (as Gerald Reitlinger's 1956 book of that title suggested), as being solely responsible for crimes of the Nazi regime. Consequently, Waffen-SS career personnel were not covered under the 1951 law.

In 1949, the ban on forming veterans' associations was lifted. Encouraged by the shifting tone of the World War II discourse and the courting of the Wehrmacht veterans by the West German government and political parties, former Waffen-SS members came forward to campaign for their interests.

== Formation ==
HIAG's history began in late 1950 by a gradual amalgamation of local groups. The majority of its members were former junior officers in the Waffen-SS. In the summer of 1951, HIAG was formally established by Otto Kumm, a former SS-Brigadeführer. By October 1951, HIAG claimed to consist of 376 local branches.

=== Leadership ===
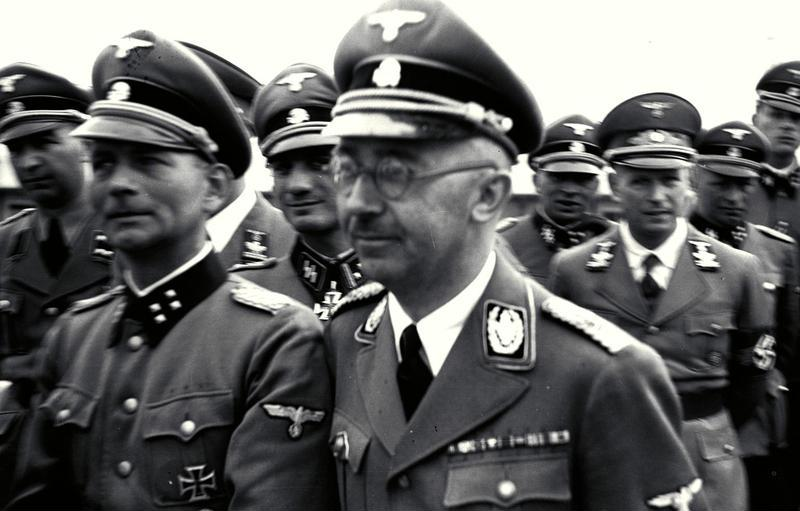
The 1941 SS tour of the Mauthausen concentration camp headed by Heinrich Himmler (centre). Taking part were Otto Kumm (front row, left), Wilhelm Bittrich, and Paul Hausser, who became key figures in HIAG after the war.

By December 1951, former high-ranking Waffen-SS general Paul Hausser was HIAG's first spokesperson. Two well-known former Waffen-SS commanders, Felix Steiner and Herbert Gille, became early leading figures. Sepp Dietrich and Kurt Meyer became active members upon their release from prison, in 1955 and 1954. Meyer became HIAG's most effective spokesman. After Meyer's death in 1961, Erich Eberhardt, formerly of SS Division Totenkopf, assumed that role. As of 1977, Wilhelm Bittrich served as the chairman.

HIAG membership was open to convicted war criminals, with the group's position being to absolve them of their responsibility. For example, the group openly embraced and advocated on behalf of Dietrich, Walter Reder, and Herbert Kappler, former SS men convicted of wartime massacres.

=== Organisational principles ===
With the publication of its first periodical, Wiking-Ruf ("Viking Call"), in late 1951, HIAG was beginning to draw attention to itself and generate public controversy, including speculation that it was a neo-Nazi organisation. In response, Hausser wrote an open letter to the Bundestag, West Germany's parliament, denying these accusations and describing the HIAG as an advocacy organisation for former Waffen-SS troops. Hausser asserted that its members rejected all forms of radicalism and were "upstanding citizens".

The HIAG bylaws of 1952 described the aims of the organisation as providing comradeship, legal assistance, support for those in Allied captivity, help for families, and aid in searches for those still missing. The HIAG campaigned for Waffen-SS veterans to be awarded the legal status of persons formerly in the public service, under article 131 of the Basic Law, so that they would qualify for the same rights and pensions as Wehrmacht's career soldiers.

The historian David C. Large wrote that, like any public pronouncements, these bylaws did not tell the full story of HIAG's real goals. By investigating how these statutes were applied in practice, he was able to tease out what the organisation stood for. For example, HIAG claimed to represent the entire Waffen-SS membership, living and dead, as well as their families: 500,000 in total. In reality, the organisation's rolls did not exceed 20,000. HIAG attained this number in the late 1950s, and maintained it until the early 1960s.

HIAG also asserted that the Waffen-SS was merely "the fourth arm of the Wehrmacht"; these claims were even "more dubious", explains Large. As a Nazi organisation combining both military and police powers, the Waffen-SS was an arm of the SS: its members stood under SS jurisdiction separate from that of the Wehrmacht; its personnel were responsible for guarding concentration camps and were thoroughly implicated in war crimes during the campaigns in the West and in the East. (Note: According to the Modern Genocide: The Definitive Resource and Document Collection, the Waffen-SS had played a "paramount role" in the ideological war of extermination (Vernichtungskrieg), and not just as frontline or rear area security formations: a third of the Einsatzgruppen (mobile killing squads) members which were responsible for mass murder, especially of Jews and communists, had been recruited from Waffen-SS personnel prior to the invasion of the Soviet Union.)

On the other hand, as the war progressed, and the Waffen-SS grew to encompass conscripts (from 1943), Waffen-SS personnel began to resemble that of the Wehrmacht, contributing to the postwar confusion as to the organisation's status. The results of conscription allowed the Waffen-SS proponents to blur the line between the Waffen-SS and the Wehrmacht, arguing not that the Waffen-SS did not participate in atrocities, but that the Wehrmacht did so as well. Large argues that the equivalence is meaningless, as, contrary to the myth of a clean Wehrmacht, it actively participated in the racial war of extermination in the Soviet Union.

=== Ideology ===
Although HIAG's leaders discouraged political affiliations, any leanings were to be "in the spirit of European and patriotic sentiment", as described in a 1951 issue of Wiking-Ruf. Internal disagreements began to emerge in the early and mid-1950s as to the stance of the organisation: Some believed in the adoption of a more open stance and the centralisation of the group under Steiner and Gille, while others within the organisation believed that this would harm the goals of rehabilitation.

== Waffen-SS advocacy ==
The main stated aims of the organisation were to provide assistance to veterans and to campaign for the rehabilitation of their legal status with respect to war pensions. During its early existence, HIAG also focused on "tracing service" actions (Kameraden-Suchdienst).

=== Tracing service meetings ===
HIAG embraced the Suchdienst activities, not only because it was concerned for the fate of some 40,000 members of the Waffen-SS who were missing in action, but because this outwardly humanitarian and non-political activity could help improve how it was perceived by the West German government and the society at large. Such public relations activities ("image polishing", according to Large) were important to HIAG, as it faced ongoing scrutiny and even calls for a ban on the organisation. The Suchdiensttreffen events (literally: tracing service meetings) later evolved into annual Kameradschaftstreffen ("veterans' reunions"), which were large-scale conventions, often accompanied by rallies.

=== Inaugural convention ===
In 1952, the organisation held its first major meeting in Verden. It began respectably, with Gille announcing that the veterans were ready to "do their duty for the Fatherland" and Steiner declaring support for "freedom, order and justice". But the next speaker delivered a different message. Hermann-Bernhard Ramcke, a former paratroop general and a convicted war criminal, invited to demonstrate so-called solidarity with the Wehrmacht, condemned the Western Allies as the "real war criminals" and insisted that the blacklist on which all former SS members then stood would soon become "a list of honour".

The outburst caused a furor within West Germany. Periodicals as far as the U.S. and Canada carried headlines "Hitler's Guard Cheers Ex-chief" and "Rabble-Rousing General Is Worrying the Allies", with the latter article reporting that Ramcke's speech had been greeted with "roars of approval and cries of 'Eisenhower, Schweinehund!' ('Pig – Dog')". HIAG and its spokesperson Steiner hastily tried to distance the organisation from Ramcke and his remarks.

=== Waffen-SS war criminals as victims ===
The notion that Waffen-SS personnel had been "soldiers like all others" found its way into the discourse regarding war captivity. HIAG claimed that its members were victims of Allied arbitrariness and complained of harsh internment conditions. HIAG equated the status of war criminals with that of prisoners of war and obfuscated the differences between the veterans of the Wehrmacht and those of the Waffen-SS.

In its periodical Wiking-Ruf, HIAG made use of the same drawings of emaciated German POWs behind barbed wire used by the publications of another post-war organisation—the West German Association of Returnees and Families of POWs and MIAs (VdH). In its turn, VdH saw its role as a counterbalance to militaristic veterans' organisations such as HIAG and explicitly distanced itself from them in the early 1950s.

Along with other veterans' organisations, HIAG campaigned for the immediate amnesty and early release of war criminals still in Allied captivity. This issue was significant, as most of these organisations made their cooperation in the area of rearmament contingent on the satisfactory resolution of the amnesty issue. It was partly for this reason that the West German government was sympathetic to the fate of these individuals and made every effort to secure their early release. Chancellor Adenauer even met with Kurt Meyer in Werl Prison when he went there on an inspection tour.

=== Relationship with political parties ===
Behind the scenes, HIAG cultivated close relationships with the ruling Christian Democratic Union (CDU) and the main opposition Social Democratic Party (SPD), garnering attention by inflating its membership numbers and influence. In meetings with politicians in the early 1950s, HIAG claimed to represent 2 million potential voters, a vast exaggeration, as only 250,000 Waffen-SS veterans were living in West Germany at that time.

In 1951, SPD leader Kurt Schumacher established contact with HIAG. When he first met with its leaders, Schumacher believed that 150,000 people were already members of HIAG, as evidenced by internal party correspondence; he considered that number to be "politically significant". In the same letter, Schumacher referred to the Waffen-SS as a "branch of the Wehrmacht". Later, the SPD defence policy expert Fritz Erler and Helmut Schmidt, a member of SPD parliamentary delegation and a future Chancellor of Germany, handled the relationship with HIAG. They maintained close contact, attending private and public meetings and keeping up regular correspondence. They often admonished HIAG leadership for the membership's "undemocratic" ways, but these efforts at reforming the veterans were futile. Such dealing with HIAG caused concerns within the SPD, where HIAG's members were thus described as "unteachables" (Unbelehrbare).

HIAG found its best champion in the centre-right Free Democratic Party (FDP), whose platform was most closely aligned to HIAG's goals. The FDP demanded the release of war criminals, seeing their incarceration as "political". Through their support of HIAG, the FDP hoped to win popular support.

=== Controversies ===
HIAG took on the cause of those imprisoned or executed for war crimes and openly celebrated its members' Nazi past. A partial list of ensuing controversies in the first 12 years of HIAG's existence includes:

- In 1953, HIAG conventioneers staged a torchlit procession for a "solstice celebration" (the manner in which Christmas was celebrated in Nazi Germany). They marched up to Staufeneck Castle in Bavaria, chanting Nazi songs, including "This Is the Guard that Adolf Hitler Loves".
- In 1954, plans for a HIAG convention in Göttingen faced strong opposition from the local Social Democratic Party (SPD), the Jewish Council, the Students' Association, and the University hierarchy. Federal government officials intervened: the event was first postponed, and then its scope was significantly curtailed.
- Following the reburial of executed war criminals in Hamelin in 1954, the cemetery there became the focal point for veterans' reunions, with distinct Nazi overtones. In 1959, the HIAG convention in Hamelin attracted a crowd of 15,000 and concluded with "comrades gathering around the tomb" of Bernhard Siebken, a convicted war criminal executed in 1949.
- Also in 1959, the Interior Minister of Hesse prohibited the holding of a HIAG Suchdiensttreffen (tracing service meeting), citing the German Red Cross's decision not to lend its support, due to these meetings being "superfluous".
- In 1961, HIAG attempted to place an obituary glorifying Max Simon, a former SS-Gruppenführer, in the German newspaper Frankfurter Allgemeine. (Allied courts had convicted Simon as a war criminal and sentenced him to life imprisonment for his role in the Marzabotto massacre, but he received a pardon in 1954. He was subsequently tried twice in the Federal courts for the killings in Brettheim and for other crimes, but "to the horror of the West German public," as the Frankfurter Allgemeine recorded in 2010, was found not guilty.) HIAG was indignant when the newspaper refused to run the obituary.
- In 1963, a HIAG convention planned for the city of Hamelin had to be cancelled on short notice, due to public pressure.

Large, who studied HIAG extensively, stated in 1987 that HIAG's anti-democratic and antisemitic statements were "the essence of what HIAG was all about", concluding that the HIAG's leaders remained true to their Nazi ideology. (Note: Large: They "never cast off the political philosophy in which they had been reared and trained") Similarly, the historian Karsten Wilke, who worked with the HIAG archives in the 2000s, discovered that the HIAG members' positions were "consistently racist, anti-Semitic and anti-democratic", as the German news magazine Der Spiegel characterised them in its 2011 article "The Brown Bluff: How Waffen SS Veterans Exploited Postwar Politics". Referencing Wilke's work, Der Spiegel quoted a HIAG member's letter to the leadership conveying the dismay at "Jews" who became "powerful once again" and could thus stand in the way of political support for the Waffen-SS rehabilitation. Spiegel also reported Wilke's findings that the HIAG leadership maintained close contacts with far-right groups.

=== Effectiveness ===
Lobbying by HIAG and other revisionists produced some early successes. In 1953, Chancellor Adenauer stated in a public speech in Hanover that members of the combat formations of the Waffen-SS had been "soldiers just like the rest" who had been "simply drafted". Large describes this declaration as "irresponsible and unhistorical", while the military historian Simon MacKenzie refers to it as "the least credible" of the several claims put forth by Waffen-SS apologists. MacKenzie states that on the Eastern Front the "Wehrmacht was just as brutal as the Waffen-SS".

In the following months, a number of war-criminals from the ranks of the Waffen-SS were released. Many of them were made eligible for prisoner-of-war compensation from local governments. In 1956, the West German Federal Ministry of Defence announced that former members of the Waffen-SS, up to the grade of lieutenant colonel, would be accepted into the Bundeswehr at their old rank. Former Waffen-SS men who wished to join the Bundeswehr still faced heightened scrutiny, especially the officers. All Waffen-SS applicants went through the rigorous vetting process reserved for those with the higher ranks in the Wehrmacht. HIAG labeled the procedure "political inquisition" and complained bitterly about it in its publications, but to no avail. As a result of this heightened review, by September 1956, only 33 of 1310 applications by ex-Waffen-SS officers had been accepted (making them 0.4% of the Bundeswehr's officer-corps), as compared to 195 of 462 applications by enlisted men.

At the height of HIAG activity in the early 1960s, around 8% of the approximately 250,000 former Waffen-SS members living in West Germany were members of HIAG. This was the timeframe when HIAG achieved its last success in economic rehabilitation: in 1961, the West German government partially restored pension rights to Waffen-SS personnel under the 131 legislation. HIAG greeted this development as a partial victory, which they hoped would lead to a complete rehabilitation. This wider aim proved impossible to achieve: the government was cautious, as rehabilitating the Waffen-SS would have opened the door to claims by personnel of other SS and Nazi organisations, including the SA, the SD, the Hitler Youth, and others—a prospect the federal government preferred not to contemplate, because of possible domestic and international consequences. Some of its more outspoken members sounded like Nazis, harming the public image of HIAG: "The wider aim of complete rehabilitation proved harder to achieve, in part because some of the more enthusiastic members of HIAG sounded alarmingly Nazi in their pronouncements."

== Waffen-SS historical negationism ==
During the Nuremberg Trials, HIAG's personnel, such as Hausser in his testimony as a defence witness, contended that the Waffen-SS was a purely military organisation no different from the Wehrmacht. The prosecution at Nuremberg rejected this claim and successfully argued that the Waffen-SS was an integral part of the SS apparatus. The Tribunal found that "the units of the Waffen-SS were directly involved in the killings of prisoners of war and the atrocities in the occupied countries" and judged the entire SS to be a criminal organisation.

HIAG aimed to reverse that judgement through significant propaganda efforts in the service of its historical negationism. According to Large, HIAG was a case study in the broader West German process of historical manipulation. HIAG's rewriting of history encompassed multi-prong publicity campaigns—including tendentious periodicals, books, and public speeches, as well as a publishing house dedicated to presenting the Waffen-SS in a positive light. The leadership viewed restoring the "tarnished shield" (Note: See the chapter "Tarnished Shield: Waffen-SS Criminality" in The Waffen SS: Hitler's Elite Guard at War, 1939–1945 (1966) by George H. Stein) as a key component of the desired legal and economic rehabilitation, and thus no effort was spared.

=== Periodicals and illustrated books ===
HIAG's first periodical was Wiking-Ruf, which was launched in 1951. In 1955, HIAG launched its other publication Der Freiwillige (The Volunteer). A 1952 editorial by Kumm highlighted key themes that were used throughout HIAG's subsequent history:

Even during the war, and especially after the war, infamous and lying propagandists have been able to make use of all the unfortunate events connected to the Third Reich and also with the SS to destroy and drag through the mud all of what was and is sacred to us. (...) Let us be clear about it: the [Allied] battle was directed not only against the authoritarian regime of the Third Reich, but, above all, against the resurgence of the strength of the German people.

Erich Kern, a far-right Austrian journalist and a former Nazi war correspondent, became the organisation's key employee responsible for its publishing arm. He first became active within HIAG in 1955, and then joined as a full-time employee in 1959. According to the historian Jonathan Petropoulos, Kern remained an "unrepentant and unreconstructed Nazi" up to his death in 1991.

The theme of foreign volunteers was featured prominently, with Steiner lending his voice in this area. In a 1958 editorial, he praised the foreign volunteers who, like German SS men, saw the "diabolical" threat of Bolshevism and "fought like lions" against it, as part of the Waffen-SS. The picture books echoed the same themes; one of them proclaimed: "From all European lands came volunteers as genuine comrades-in-arms. They fought for their Fatherland against Bolshevism."

Glossy books, such as Waffen-SS in Pictures (1957), featured, as described by MacKenzie, "tales of valour and heroism" and "propaganda photographs of Aryan-ideal volunteers from all over the Continent". In 1972, HIAG produced a five-hundred page SS picture tome under the nostalgic title When All Our Brothers Are Silent. Hausser spearheaded the project with Jochen Peiper, a controversial Waffen-SS figure, as a contributor. Other similar books included Scattered are the Traces (1979), Cavalry Divisions of the Waffen-SS (1982), Panzer Grenadiers of the 'Viking' Division in Pictures (1984), and many others. (One of the cavalry units in question, SS Cavalry Brigade, was responsible for the murder of an estimated 23,700 Jews and others in July–August 1941 alone, during the Pripyat Marshes massacres. Its regimental commander Lombard reported eliminating close to 11,000 "plunderers" in the first two weeks of the same operation.)

=== Public speeches ===
HIAG leadership denied that there was any connection between the Waffen-SS and Nazi atrocities. In 1957, Paul Hausser wrote, in Der Freiwillige, an open letter to West Germany's minister of defence, stating that the concentration camp guard units (SS-Totenkopfverbände) served on external detail only, "without the possibility of interfering with the internal procedure". He did not mention that the guards accompanied prisoners to labour sites and that the commanders of concentration camps generally came from the Waffen-SS. This apologist position also ignored the fact that the organisational structure of the SS tied the Waffen-SS to the Nazi annihilation machine through the transfer of personnel between various SS units and the shifting responsibilities of the units themselves, as they might perform frontline duties at one time, and then be reassigned to "bandit-fighting" operations – or Bandenbekämpfung – in the rear.

Kurt Meyer embodied the voice of Waffen-SS apologists. In 1957, speaking at the HIAG convention in Karlsberg, Bavaria, he stated that "SS troops committed no crimes, except the massacre at Oradour, and that was the action of a single man". Meyer claimed that the Waffen-SS was the same as the German Army. On another occasion, Meyer publicly denounced the "regime" [West Germany] that could "honour traitors" but would vilify its soldiers. He condemned the notion of "collective guilt" and equated Jews and Jesuits to the Nazis and the Waffen-SS, as all being victims of history and prejudice. In the first instance, Meyer was most likely referring to Adolf Diekmann who was the senior officer present during the Oradour massacre. Meyer himself had served a lengthy prison term for his role in the Ardenne Abbey massacre. In the second instance, he was apparently referring to the members of the 20 July plot. At Jochen Peiper's memorial in 1976, Hubert Meyer referenced Peiper's open letter from Landsberg Prison, which had previously been quoted in Hausser's 1953 books. Hubert Meyer's speech later appeared in the November 1976 issue of Der Freiwillige:

For a broad public in Germany and even more throughout the rest of the world, [Peiper] has become the embodiment of that which all of us were clearly, intentionally and wrongly burdened in Nuremberg.... We have not forgotten what Jochen Peiper wrote to us from Landsberg Prison in 1952: "Don't forget that the first Europeans killed in action were in the units of the Waffen-SS, that the ones beaten to death during the post war period mostly were men from our ranks. They had become fair game because of their belief in the indivisibility of Western Europe. Remember these martyrs."

=== Memoirs ===
To buttress the reputation of the Waffen-SS, the memoirs of HIAG's leading members featured quotations by former Wehrmacht generals endorsing the fighting skills of the force. Steiner's, Meyer's, and Hausser's books have been characterised by historian Charles Sydnor as the "most important works of [Waffen-SS] apologist literature". They demanded rehabilitation of the combat branch of the Nazi Party and presented Waffen-SS members as "soldiers just like any other".

- Paul Hausser's 1953 book Waffen-SS in Action (German: Waffen-SS im Einsatz) was the first major work by one of the HIAG leaders. It had an unmistakable connection to the Nazi origins of the Waffen-SS: the SS runes on the cover art and the SS motto ("My honour is called loyalty") embossed on the cloth cover. Former Wehrmacht general Heinz Guderian endorsed Waffen-SS troops in a foreword and referred to them as "the first realisation of the European idea". Hausser described the growth of the Waffen-SS into a so-called multinational force where foreign volunteers fought heroically as a "militant example of the great European idea". Waffen-SS in Action was included in the index of objectionable war books maintained by West Germany's Federal Department for Media Harmful to Young Persons. The index was created in 1960 to limit the sale of such works to minors, due to the works' chauvinism and glorification of violence.
- Kurt Meyer's memoirs published in 1957, detailed his exploits at the front and served as an element in the rehabilitation campaign. He condemned the "inhuman suffering" that the Waffen-SS personnel had been subjected to "for crimes which they neither committed, nor were able to prevent". Sydnor referred to Grenadiere as "perhaps the boldest and most truculent of the apologist works".
- Felix Steiner published The Volunteers of Waffen-SS: Idea and Sacrifice (German: Die Freiwilligen der Waffen-SS: Idee und Opfergang) in 1958, stressing the theme of the purely military Waffen-SS, along with the notion that the Waffen-SS, by having drawn on volunteers from Europe, could serve as a model of European unity.

Both Hausser and Steiner followed up their 1950s books with works published in the 1960s. Published in 1963, Steiner's book was called The Army of Outlaws (German: Die Armee der Geächteten). Hausser's work appeared in 1966 under the title Soldiers Like Any Other (German: Soldaten wie andere auch). According to MacKenzie, the books' titles were symbolic of the Waffen-SS image that HIAG's leaders wanted to portray, while Sydnor describes this later generation of books as "equally tendentious". In addition to HIAG's own publishing house Munin Verlag (below), similar books were also published by Plesse Verlag in Göttingen.

=== Munin Verlag imprint ===
In 1958, HIAG established its own publishing house—Munin Verlag. The name comes from Norse mythology popular with right-wing movements. Muninn is one of the two ravens that are the companions of the god Odin; muninn is Old Norse for "memory".

The aim of the publishing house was to publish, in cooperation with HIAG, the works of former Waffen-SS members. Its authors were former Waffen-SS unit commanders or staff officers who were members of HIAG. The Munin Verlag titles did not go through the rigorous fact-checking processes common in peer-reviewed historical literature; they were revisionist accounts, unedited by professional historians, presenting the former Waffen-SS members' version of events. Until HIAG's dissolution in 1992, Munin-Verlag published 57 titles.

=== Unit histories and biographies ===
Walter Harzer took on the role of the official historian of HIAG, in charge of coordinating the writing of the histories of Waffen-SS divisions. HIAG worked with historian Ernst Klink, of the Military History Research Office (MGFA) in Freiburg, to screen materials donated to the German Federal Military Archive for any information that may have implicated units and personnel in questionable activity. To rehabilitate the image of the force, HIAG underwrote the publication of works by right-wing academics sympathetic to the Waffen-SS.

The unit narratives were extensive (often in several volumes) and strived for an official-seeming representation of their history, backed by maps and operational orders. MacKenzie points out that "the older or the more famous the unit, the larger the work—to the point where no less than five volumes and well over 2,000 pages were devoted to the doings of the 2nd Panzer Division Das Reich", authored by one of its former officers, Otto Weidinger.

The French author Jean-Paul Picaper, who studied the Oradour massacre perpetrated by the men of the Das Reich, notes the tendentious nature of Weidinger's narrative: it provided a sanitised version of history without any references to massacres. He argues that the unit histories, like other HIAG publications, focused on the "positive", "heroic" side of National Socialism. The researcher Danny S. Parker notes similar efforts undertaken to rewrite the history of the Leibstandarte division. (Note: According to Parker, "the way the old comrades wanted it remembered".) HIAG worked with Rudolf Lehmann, chief of staff of the 1st SS Panzer Corps, to produce what Parker calls an "exculpating multi-volume chronicle" of the division, which even whitewashed the Malmedy massacre. HIAG involved a legal consultant to make sure the account would be within the framework of the strict German laws prohibiting glorification of the Nazi past. The project also included the former chief of staff of the unit, Dietrich Ziemssen, who in 1952 produced a denialist version of the massacre in his pamphlet Der Malmedy Prozess. (Note: Danny Parker calls the pamphlet an "exculpatory manifesto" and writes: "The literary subversion worked. Now the SS veterans had moved themselves from being the prosecutors to the prosecuted!")

In the mid-to-late 1970s, HIAG attempted to commission a favorable biography of Peiper, to stop "the bad rumors", according to a HIAG official. "We must steadfastly remain behind the wheel and direct this book ourselves, otherwise [Erich Kern] will do it", Harzer wrote to a fellow member in 1976. HIAG contemplated approaching (or approached) Herbert Reinecker, a prolific screenwriter who had served in a propaganda company (Propagandakompanie) of the Waffen-SS, but nothing came out of it.

=== Successes and other outcomes ===
By the mid-1950s, HIAG had been able to differentiate the Waffen-SS from other SS formations; the crimes that could not be denied were attributed to Allgemeine-SS (security and police), the SS-Totenkopfverbände, and the Einsatzgruppen. The Waffen-SS was thus successfully integrated into the myth of the clean Wehrmacht. The positive image of the Waffen-SS indeed found a receptive audience during the Cold War. Senior Waffen-SS personnel were "not shy about suggesting that they had once organised and led a NATO-like army (and an elite one at that)", notes MacKenzie. John M. Steiner, in his 1975 work, points out that SS apologists, especially strongly represented in HIAG, stressed that they were the first to fight for Europe and Western civilisation against "Asiatic Communist hordes".

Quoting German political journalist Karl Otto Paetel, the historian George Stein writes, in his 1966 book, that the works produced by HIAG's circle were trying to show "the soldiers of the Waffen-SS were brave fighters, suffered big losses and, as far as they served in the front line, did not run exterminations camps". Stein notes that the apologists define the Waffen-SS narrowly and are silent on the matter of war crimes. He notes that only a minority of men were implicated in committing known atrocities and that the most historically significant role of the Waffen-SS was in the battles for "Hitler's Europe". But "to recognise this is not to agree with the apologists who picture the overwhelming majority of the men of the Waffen-SS as idealistic, clean-living, decent and honourable soldiers", Stein writes.

Wilke argues that by the 1970s HIAG attained a monopoly on the historical representation of the Waffen-SS. Its recipe was simple and contained just four ingredients: the Waffen-SS was apolitical, elite, innocent of all war crimes or Nazi atrocities, and a European army par excellence, the Army of Europe. Historians dismiss this characterisation. Picaper labels it as a self-panegyric, while Large uses the words "extravagant fantasies about [the Waffen-SS's] past and future". MacKenzie refers to HIAG's body of work as a "chorus of self-justification", and Stein refers to them as apologetics. Historian James M. Diehl writes that, contrary to HIAG's claims, the Waffen-SS was not the fourth branch of the Wehrmacht and it was outrageous to describe it as a precursor to NATO.

== Transition into right-wing extremism ==
HIAG then began its drift into the far right, further retreating into its Nazi past. For a time, HIAG published a calendar that marked Nazi commemoration dates. Many of the organisation's founding members did not evolve with the times. For example, at least through the 1970s, Kumm remained "the ever unreformed Nazi enthusiast", according to Parker.

In the 1970s and 1980s, as the West German public's awareness of the SS atrocities grew, the attitudes towards Waffen-SS veterans shifted dramatically. The federal organisation and local groups were ostracised, with their meetings and commemorations greeted with protests. At the same time, neo-Nazi and nationalist movements found in the Waffen-SS something on which to project their understanding of World War II.

During the 1980s, HIAG's vociferous public events created almost insurmountable image problems, such as when a 1985 meeting turned into a public relations disaster. The press reported on the singing of forbidden Nazi songs, clashes with protesters, and even Waffen-SS reenactors. In an even more damaging development, Stern investigative reporter Gerhard Kromschröder infiltrated the meeting, posing as a war buff. He later published a damning article called "Nazi Family Reunion" (Note: See HIAG#External links for the text of the article (in German)) containing statements from a Waffen-SS veteran that ranged from virulent antisemitism to Holocaust denial and mentions of happy concentration camp inmates "singing like birds". The Federal Office for the Protection of the Constitution monitored HIAG as a far-right organisation during its later history, although HIAG was briefly taken off the list of neo-Nazi and extremist groups in 1984, causing another controversy.

== Dissolution ==
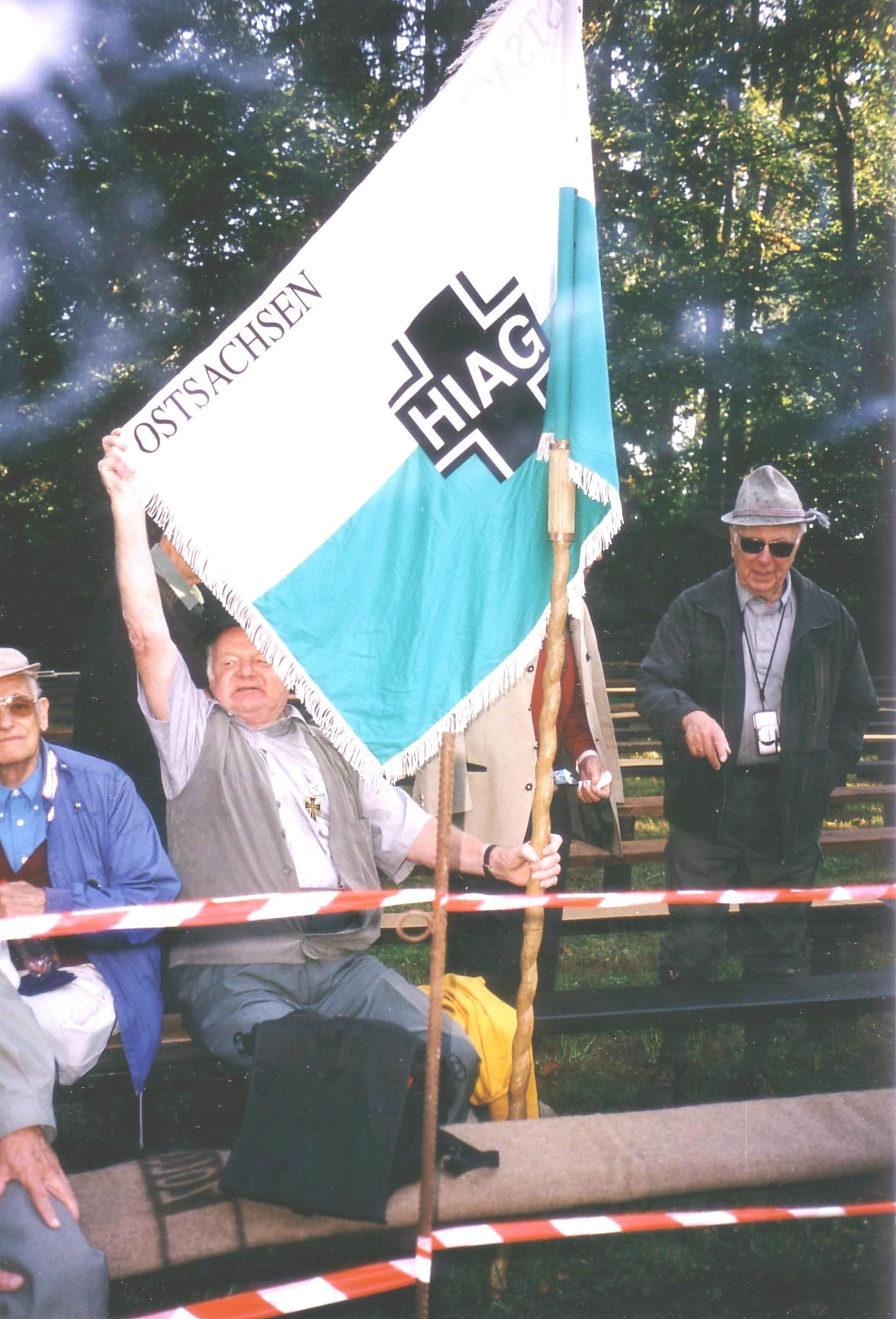
"HIAG Ostsachsen" at the Ulrichsberg meeting at Ulrichsberg mountain in 2003

Increasingly ostracised, HIAG disbanded at the federal level in 1992. Regional HIAG chapters continued to exist through the 2000s, at least one into the 2010s. These groups worked to maintain momentum through the recruitment of younger generations and through outreach to foreign veterans of the Waffen-SS, aided by the continued publication of Der Freiwillige. "[Its] acclaimed aim, today [2014], is to link older and younger generations in a common cause", notes the historians Steffen Werther and Madeleine Hurd. The publication's predominant theme continued to be "Europe against Bolshevism", with several editorials devoted to the idea that the Waffen-SS laid the foundation for the unification of Europe, expansion of NATO, and "freedom of Fatherlands", as stated in one of the magazine's issues.

HIAG's informal successor was the international War Grave Memorial Foundation "When All Brothers Are Silent" (German: Kriegsgräberstiftung 'Wenn alle Brüder schweigen'), formed with a stated goal of maintaining war graves. In the 1990s and 2000s, after the fall of the Berlin Wall, the foundation worked on arranging new commemorative sites for the Waffen-SS dead in the former Soviet Union, including one in Ukraine.

== Assessment and legacy ==
HIAG never grew to the size of other West German veterans' organisations, the most successful of which, VdH, had membership approaching 500,000. Diehl, who studied postwar veterans' movements in West Germany, writes that the overwhelming majority of Waffen-SS veterans, who were more interested in rebuilding their civilian lives or getting too old to consider returning to military service, ignored Der Freiwillige's "fire-eating editorials". HIAG's membership began to fall sharply in the 1960s, while the organisation itself was never a significant threat to democracy. "HIAG's main goal was pensions, not a restoration of the Third Reich", he notes. HIAG's performance as a lobbying organisation was mixed. Large sees a "combination of resentment, myopia and inflated self-importance" in HIAG's efforts and attitudes. He credits West Germany's government, major political parties, and military planners with keeping distance between HIAG and other veterans' organisations sufficient to limit HIAG's role in the new republic and its armed forces.

As a "crucible of historical revisionism" (in Picaper's phrase), HIAG attempted to rewrite and manipulate history. HIAG was instrumental in creating the perception in popular culture of the Waffen-SS as being "comrades-in-arms engaged in a noble crusade", according to MacKenzie, who highlights the long-term effects of HIAG's revisionism: "As older generation of Waffen-SS scribes has died off, a new, post-war cadre of writers has done much to perpetuate the image of the force as a revolutionary European army. The degree of admiration and acceptance varies, but the overall tendency to accentuate the positive lives on, or has indeed grown stronger."

== See also ==
- Association of Knight's Cross Recipients - A similar organisation advocation specifically for Knight's Cross recipients
- Waffen-SS veterans in post-war Germany
