= Society for Army Historical Research =

Learned society

The Society for Army Historical Research
- Abbreviation: SAHR
- Established: 1921; 105 years ago
- Type: Learned society
- Registration no.: 247844
- Legal status: Unincorporated charity
- Location: United Kingdom
- Members: 730 (2024)
- Patron: Prince Edward, Duke of Kent
- President: Edward Smyth-Osbourne
- Publication: Journal of the Society for Army Historical Research
- Volunteers: 7 (2024)
- Website: sahr.org.uk
- Remarks: Motto, Latin: Praeterita Explorando Discimus, lit. 'we learn by exploring the past'

The Society for Army Historical Research is a learned society, founded in 1921 to foster "interest in the history and traditions of British and Commonwealth armies, and to encourage research in these fields." It is one of the oldest societies of its kind. Past members include notable British Field Marshals Wavell, Auchinleck and Templer. The current president is Lieutenant-General Sir Edward Smyth-Osbourne and Brigadier James Cook is chairman of its council. The patron of the society is Field Marshal HRH the Duke of Kent.

The society's interests embrace both army and regimental history, military antiquities and pictures, uniforms, badges and medals, arms and equipment and the history of land warfare in general. The study of campaigns, commanders and the political aspects of war are covered from the sixteenth century to the recent past.

From 2022, the society has conferred a small number of Fellowships, allowing the holder the use of the postnominals FSAHR.

== Journal ==
The society's main activity is the publication of the peer-reviewed quarterly Journal of the Society for Army Historical Research reflecting its members' interests. Issues of the Journal contain a mixture of articles, which are peer-reviewed, communications, which typically deal with more specialised subjects and are not subject to peer-review, and book reviews. Listings are also included of recent academic work in the field of military history, and of new archival resources of relevance to the topic. Each issue typically contains at least one colour plate, as well as other illustrations. Not all articles are dryly academic; there are often interesting or amusing anecdotal forays into historical nooks, or revealing examinations of unjustly forgotten soldiers. In addition, over the years, the society has produced a number of special issues: topics for special issues include monographs on dress distinctions and bibliographical or regimental research aids, previously-unpublished soldiers' letters or diaries, and anthologies of material dealing with specific topics - most recently the Peninsular War and the Battle of Waterloo, and the Great War.

== Templer Medal ==
Since 1982, the society has awarded the Templer Medal to the author of the most impressive or significant book relating to the British, Commonwealth or Dominion armies published in the preceding year. This prize was founded to commemorate the life and achievements of Field Marshal Sir Gerald Templer, best known for his defeat of the guerrilla rebels in Malaya between 1952 and 1954. He was president of the society from 1965 to 1979. The prize is awarded at the society annual general meeting in the year following the year of publication. The Templer Medal has been awarded for the following books:

- 1981 Fit for Service: The Training of the British Army 1715–1795, by J.A. Houlding.
- 1982 A History of the British Cavalry, Volume 3: 1872–1898, by the Marquess of Anglesey.
- 1983 For the Sake of Example: Capital Courts-Martial 1914–1920, by Anthony Babington.
- 1984 The British Army and Theory of Armored Warfare 1918–1940, by Robert H. Larson.
- 1985 From Waterloo to Balaclava: Tactics, Technology and the British Army 1815–1854, by Hew Strachan.
- 1986 Monty: The Field Marshal 1944-1976, by Nigel Hamilton.
- 1987 The British Army of William III, by John Childs.
- 1988 Kitchener's Army: The Raising of New Armies 1914–16, by Peter Simkins.
- 1989 No award made.
- 1990 British Counterinsurgency 1919–60, by Thomas R. Mockaitis.
- 1991 The Crimean Doctors. A History of the British Medical Service in the Crimean War, by John Shepherd.
- 1992 Politics and Military Morale: Current-Affairs and Citizenship Education in the British Army 1914–1950, by S.P. Mackenzie.
- 1993 To Long Tan: The Australian Army and the Vietnam War 1950–1966, by Ian McNeill.
- 1994 No award made.
- 1995 British Victory in Egypt 1801: The End of Napoleon's Conquest, by Piers Mackesy.
- 1996 The English Ordnance Office, 1585–1625: A Case Study in Bureaucracy, by Richard W. Stewart.
- 1997 Small Arms of the East India Company, 1600–1856, Vols 1 and 2, by David Harding.
- 1998 British Logistics on the Western Front, 1914–1919, by Ian Malcolm Brown.
- 1999 British Military Intelligence in the Crimean War, 1854–1856, by Stephen M. Harris.
- 2000 Raising Churchill's Army: The British Army and War against Germany 1919-45, by David French.
- 2001 No award made.
- 2002 The British General Staff: Reform and Innovation, edited by David French & Brian Holden Reid.
- 2003 Phoenix from the Ashes: The Indian Army in the Burma Campaign, by Daniel P. Marston.
- 2004 Medicine and Victory: British Military Medicine in the Second World War, by Mark Harrison.
- 2005 Military Identities: The Regimental System, the British Army, and the British People, c.1870–2000, by David French.
- 2006 Field Marshal Sir Henry Wilson: A Political Soldier, by Keith Jeffery.
- 2007 No award made.
- 2008 Douglas Haig and the First World War, by J. P. Harris.
- 2009 Bloody Victory: The Sacrifice of the Somme and the Making of the Twentieth Century, by William Philpott.
- 2010 The Medical War: British Military Medicine in the First World War, by Mark Harrison.
- 2011 Soldiers, by Richard Holmes (posthumously).
- 2012 A Military History of Scotland, by Edward Spiers, Jeremy Crang & Matthew Strickland.
- 2013 Monty’s Men by John Buckley.
- 2014 National Service: A Generation in Uniform, 1945–1963 by Richard Vinen.
- 2015 Wellington: Waterloo and the Fortunes of Peace 1815–1852 by Rory Muir.
- 2016 Early Modern Systems of Command: Queen Anne's Generals, Staff Officers and the Direction of Allied Warfare in the Low Countries and Germany, 1702–1711, by Stewart Stansfield.
- 2017 Waterloo: The Campaign of 1815, by John Hussey.
- 2018 Our Boys: The Story of a Paratrooper, by Helen Parr.
- 2019 Fighting the People's War: The British & Commonwealth Armies and the Second World War, by Jonathan Fennell.
- 2020 Britain’s War: A New World 1942-1947, by Daniel Todman.
- 2021 The 1945 Burma Campaign and the Transformation of the British Indian Army, by Raymond Callahan and Daniel Marston.
- 2022 The Wandering Army: The Campaigns that Transformed the British Way of War, by Huw Davies.
- 2023 England and the Thirty Years War, by Adam Marks.
- 2024 The British Army 1783-1815, by Kevin Linch.
- 2025 The Wars of the Roses: War and Martial Culture in England, 1455-1487, by David Grummitt.

Beginning with the 2014 prize, an award has also made for the best first book submitted in each year's competition. From the 2023 award, this has been branded as the Chapple Prize in honour of past-President Field Marshal Sir John Chapple. For this prize, edited volumes and co-authored books and monographs are discounted by the judges, who will consider only sole authored and substantial works. This prize has been awarded as follows:

- 2014 Disease, War, and the Imperial State: The Welfare of British Armed Forces during the Seven Years War by Erica Charters.
- 2015 High Command: British Military Leadership in the Iraq and Afghanistan Wars by Major-General Christopher Elliott.
- 2016 Till the Trumpet Sounds Again: The Scots Guards 1914–19 in Their Own Words, by Randall Nicol.
- 2017 The Fear of Invasion: Strategy, Politics, and British War Planning, 1880–1914, by David G. Morgan-Owen.
- 2018 Learning to Fight: Military Innovation and Change in the British Army 1914–18, by Aimée Fox.
- 2019 The Veterans' Tale: British Military Memoirs of the Second World War, by Frances Houghton.
- 2020 Major-General Oliver Nugent: The Irishman who led the Ulster Division in the Great War, by Nicholas Perry.
- 2021 The Changing of the Guard: The British Army since 9/11, by Simon Akam.
- 2022 Ham & Jam: 6th Airborne Division in Normandy - Generating Combat Effectiveness, by Andrew Wheale.
- 2023 Birdie: More than the Soul of ANZAC: Field Marshal Lord Birdwood of ANZAC and Totnes 1865-1951, by Lieutenant Colonel Richard Farrimond.
- 2024 The Best of Appointments? The Evolution of Infantry Brigade Command in the British Army on the Western Front, 1915-18, by Roger Wood
- 2025 Infantry in Battle 1733-1783, by Alexander S. Burns.

== Other Activities ==
The society also awards research grants to graduate students and maintains essay prizes for sixth-form pupils and undergraduates. Other activities include the organisation of lectures, discussion events, and tours.

== Past Presidents ==
- 1921–1932 Harold Dillon, 17th Viscount Dillon
- 1932–1947 Colonel Thomas Fremantle, 3rd Baron Cottesloe
- 1947–1950 Field Marshal Archibald Wavell, 1st Earl Wavell
- 1950–1961 George Cambridge, 2nd Marquess of Cambridge
- 1961–1965 Field Marshal Sir Claude Auchinleck
- 1965–1979 Field Marshal Sir Gerald Templer
- 1980–1993 General Sir David Fraser
- 1993–2012 Field Marshal Sir John Chapple
- 2012–2024 Lieutenant-General Sir Barney White-Spunner
