= Der Freiwillige =

German neo-Nazi magazine

- 1959 cover of Der Freiwillige with a reference to the HIAG meeting in Hamelin. The gathering is termed Suchdiensttreffen ("tracing service meeting"), but was in fact a large-scale convention with 15,000 members attending.
- Editor: Erich Kern
- Categories: Nazism
- First issue: 1956; 70 years ago
- Final issue: 2014; 12 years ago
- Company: Munin-Verlag
- Country: West Germany; Germany
- Based in: Reinsfeld
- Language: German
- OCLC: 224554876

Der Freiwillige (lit. 'The Volunteer') was a German magazine, published from 1956 as the official organ of HIAG, a lobby group and a denialist veterans' organisation founded by former high-ranking Waffen-SS personnel in West Germany in 1951. In 2014, the publication was merged into DMZ Zeitgeschichte.

== Bibliography ==
- Large, David C. (1987). "Reckoning without the Past: The HIAG of the Waffen-SS and the Politics of Rehabilitation in the Bonn Republic, 1950–1961". The Journal of Modern History. 59 (1). University of Chicago Press: 79–113. doi:10.1086/243161. JSTOR 1880378. S2CID 144592069.
- Steiner, John Michael (1975). Power Politics and Social Change in National Socialist Germany: A Process of Escalation Into Mass Destruction. The Hague: De Gruyter Mouton. ISBN 978-90-279-7651-2.
- Ward, Richard, ed. (2015). A Global History of Execution and the Criminal Corpse. New York: Palgrave Macmillan. ISBN 978-1-137-44399-1.
