= Army Group C =

- German: Heeresgruppe C
- Active: 26 August 1939 – 22 June 1941; 26 November 1943 – 2 May 1945
- Country: Nazi Germany
- Branch: Heer ( Wehrmacht)
- Engagements: Phony War; Saar Offensive; Battle of France; Italian campaign

Commanders
- Notable commanders: Albert Kesselring

Army Group C (German: Heeresgruppe C) was an army group of the German Wehrmacht during World War II. In its first deployment between 1939 and 1941, its main assignment was the defense of the Franco-German border during the Phony War and the Western Campaign, after which it was moved to East Prussia to become Army Group North. When Army Group C was recreated from 1943 to 1945, it was used to coordinate German forces on the Italian front.

== History ==
=== 1939–1941 ===
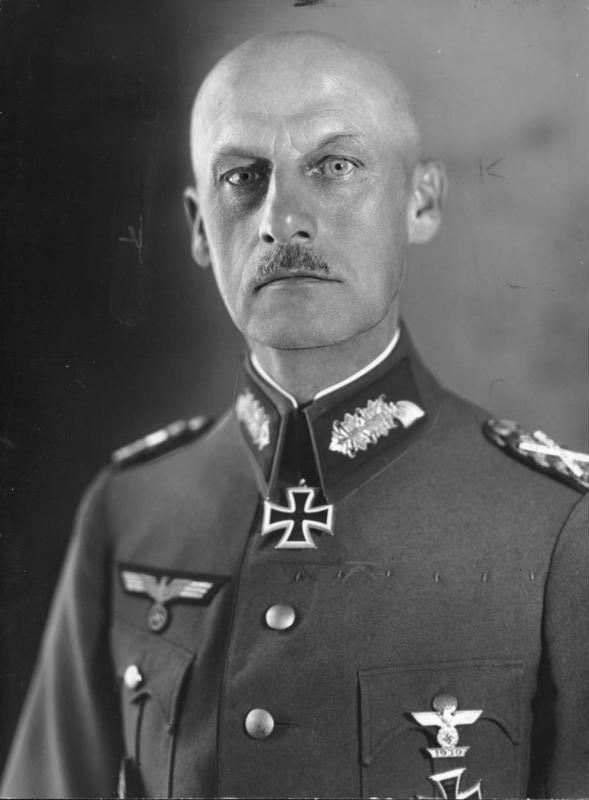
Between 1939 and 1941, Army Group C was commanded by Wilhelm Ritter von Leeb.

Army Group C was first formed in Frankfurt on 26 August 1939, from Army Group Command 2 (itself formed on 1 October 1919 as Reichswehrgruppenkommando) in Frankfurt/Main. The only commander of the army group throughout its first tenure of service was Wilhelm Ritter von Leeb, who had been reactivated from retirement upon the outbreak of the war.

Between September 1939 and June 1940, Army Group C was deployed to the country's western frontier (mainly to the Franco-German border) to guard the German rear during the Invasion of Poland and Unternehmen Weserübung by other parts of the German armed forces. In preparation of the Battle of France, Army Group A and Army Group B were deployed along the north and center of Germany's western border, leaving Army Group C in control of the Upper Rhine and Palatinate regions. Its principal formation during the Phony War (September 1939 – May 1940) were the 1st Army and 7th Army. Both French and German forces remained largely dormant during the period of September 1939 to May 1940; a small-scale French offensive (Saar Offensive) was answered by the Germans with a disciplined withdrawal into their border fortifications (Siegfried Line) and resulted in the French occupation of around 20 German villages without major combat casualties on either sides. The French side, once faced with the more formidable German static defenses along the Siegfried Line, failed to follow up on their offensive in any meaningful way, causing a prolonged lull in combat along the frontline.

While the primary attacks against France (to begin on 10 May 1940) were to be carried out by Army Group C's northern neighbors (Case Yellow, Case Red), the command of Army Group C was tasked in February 1940 with the conceptualization of a potential breakthrough attempt against the French fortifications along the border (the "Maginot Line"). Several operational plans resulted, titled "Case Green", "Case Brown", and several operations with codenames such as "Bear", "Lynx", "Panther", and "Tiger". Ultimately, only the latter operation would be executed (starting on 14 June 1940).

As Army Group A and Army Group B penetrated into the Low Countries (German invasion of the Netherlands, German invasion of Belgium) and eventually into France itself, Army Group C remained mostly passive, as did the French forces opposite it. Only on 14 June 1940, when the campaign was essentially decided (Paris was captured by 18th Army forces on the same day), did forces of Army Group C launch an offensive against the French defenders of the Maginot Line. Forces of the German 1st Army attacked from the Saarbrücken sector (Operation Tiger). They were joined on 15 June by the forces of 7th Army; on that day, German forces crossed the Upper Rhine in mass at Breisach. The French government eventually agreed to an armistice on 22 June; the armistice went into force at 01:35 on 25 June.

On 19 July 1940, Leeb was promoted to Generalfeldmarschall.

On 25 August 1940, Army Group C was ordered back into Germany, where it initially was to take up training tasks during the transitionary period between the German invasion of France and the imminent German invasion of the Soviet Union in June 1941. On 20 April 1941, Army Group C was given the deception name "Section Staff East Prussia" (German: Abschnittstab Ostpreußen) and received new headquarters in East Prussia. With the beginning of the invasion of the Soviet Union, Army Group C (still under the command of Leeb) was officially redesignated Army Group North.

=== Recreation, 1943–1945 ===
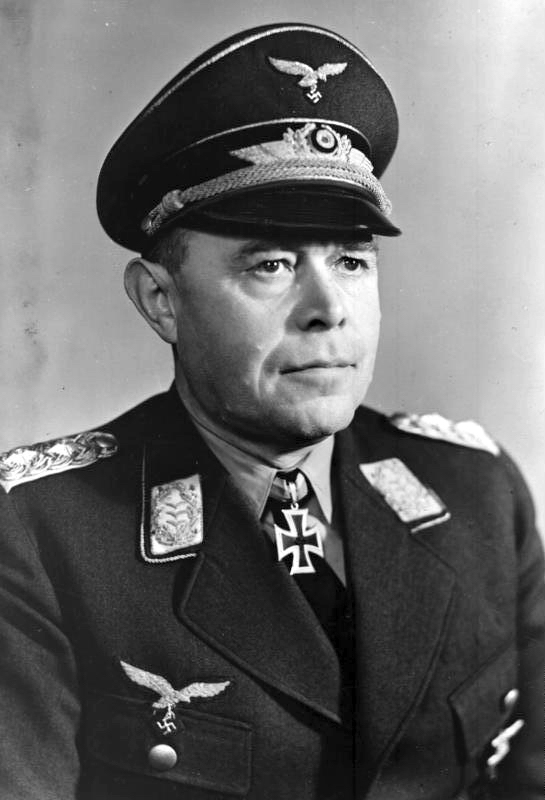
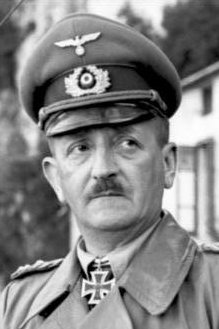
Between 1943 and 1945, Army Group C was initially commanded by Albert Kesselring, who was eventually succeeded by Heinrich von Vietinghoff.

On 26 November 1943, Army Group C was recreated for usage on the Italian front. Its immediate predecessor formation, from which the initial staff personnel had been drawn, was the staff of Supreme Commander South (German: Oberbefehlshaber Süd) of the Luftwaffe, previously tasked with the support of the Italian Comando Supremo against the Allies in the Mediterranean theater. The previous Oberbefehlshaber Süd, Albert Kesselring, took charge of the new army group. The two most important armies under the command of Army Group C on the Italian theater were 10th Army and 14th Army.

On 3 August 1944, Army Group C was strengthened with the addition of Army Liguria, a German-Italian unit formed from the remnants of the pro-Axis Italian armed forces, organized under the pro-German Italian Social Republic.

As Albert Kesselring was definitively deployed to the Western Front in March 1945, Heinrich von Vietinghoff succeeded Kesselring as commander-in-chief of Army Group C on 10 March 1945.

On 2 May 1945, Army Group C surrendered to the Anglo-American forces.

== Commanders ==
- Wilhelm Ritter von Leeb, 26 August 1939 – 21 June 1941
- Albert Kesselring, 26 November 1943 – 26 October 1944
- Heinrich von Vietinghoff, 26 October 1944 – 15 January 1945
- Albert Kesselring, 15 January – 9 March 1945
- Heinrich von Vietinghoff, 10 March – 30 April 1945
- Friedrich Schulz, 1 May 1945
- Hans Röttiger, 2 May 1945
