= Erich Kern =

Austrian journalist (1906–1991)

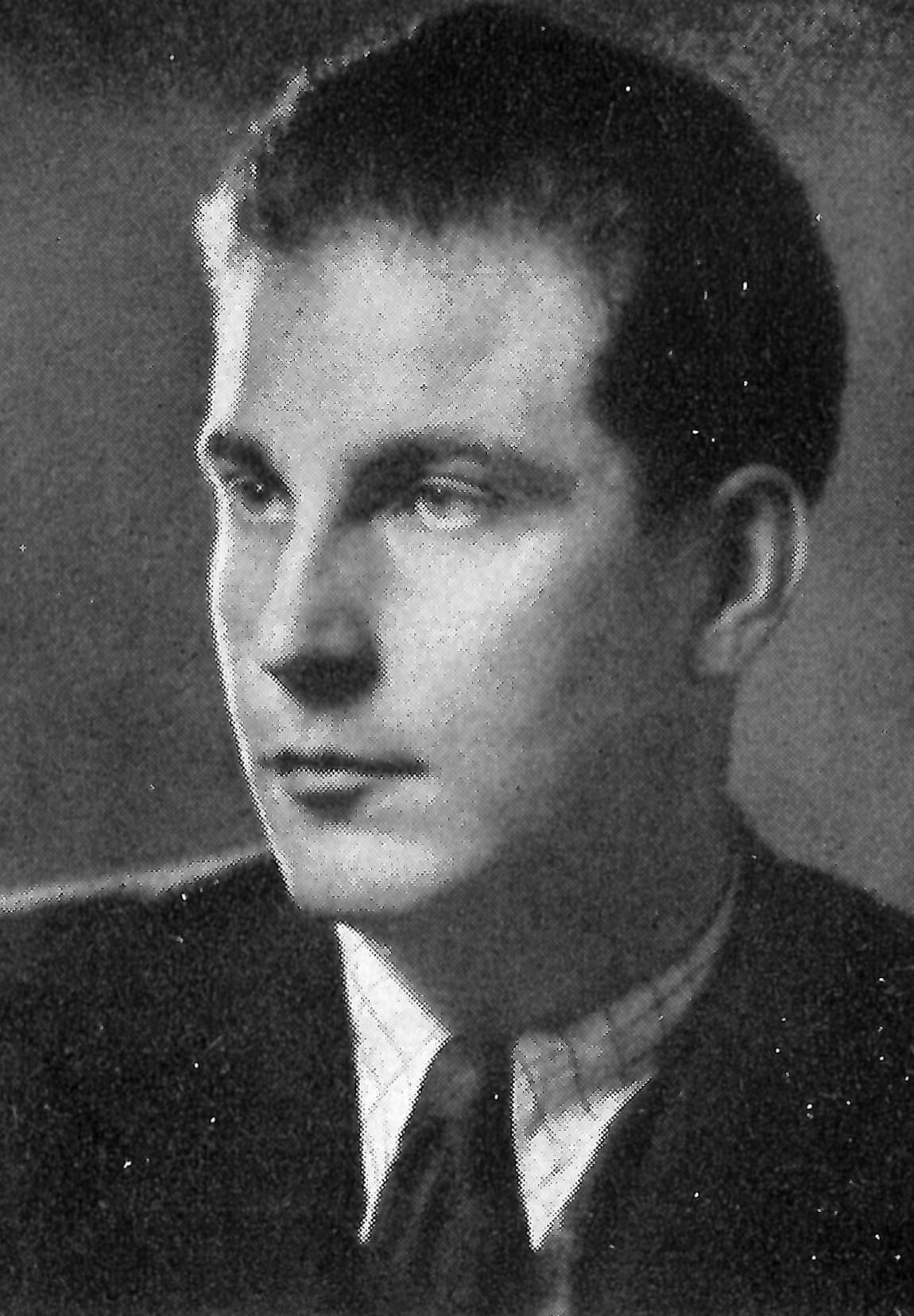
Image of Erich Kern

Erich Kern (born Erich Knud Kernmayr on 27 February 1906 – died 13 September 1991) was a far-right Austrian journalist, war-time propagandist, and a post-war Nazi activist. He became a writer of revisionist books that sought to glorify the activities of the German soldiers during the Second World War.

== Early years ==
Kernmayer was born in Graz. As a youth he was briefly affiliated to the youth wing of the Social Democratic Party of Austria and Communist Party of Austria, before moving to the right, initially with the radical Sturmvolk movement before joining the Austrian Nazi Party. As the party was illegal he was imprisoned for a while in 1934.

His first experience as a journalist came on the Essener National-Zeitung, a local newspaper owned by Hermann Göring. He subsequently served as press-chief to Gauleiter Josef Bürckel, effectively controlling the press in both Ostmark and Saarland. By 1940 he was the chief of the Pressestelle of Gauleiters. He saw active service during the Second World War with the Waffen SS, holding the rank of Obersturmbannführer. Taken prisoner after the war, he was held in American internment in Austria for two and a half years before being released in 1948.

== Writing ==
During the Second World War, he had served with the 4th Battalion of the SS Division Leibstandarte around the Black Sea and wrote about his experiences in his 1948 book Der Grosse Rausch, which was republished in English as Dance of Death in 1951. In the book he bemoaned the failure of Nazi Germany in the Soviet Union, arguing that a German victory would have brought culture to the supposedly uncivilized Russian people. The book was published only a few months after his release, despite one of the conditions being that he was banned from any publishing. Kern moved to West Germany in 1949 where he became known as a novelist. As an author on military history his works were largely published by the Verlag Welsermühl, a far-right revisionist publishing house that sought to portray a pro-German version of Second World War history.

Another book, Menschen im Netz (1957) formed the basis for the Franz Peter Wirth-directed film People in the Net (1959). He was also press chief of the HIAG and editor of Der Freiwillige, their monthly journal. In this capacity he became noted for his defences of the actions of the SS and his celebrations of that movement. Kern served as editor of the radical nationalist journals Deutsche Soldaten-Zeitung, Deutsche Wochenzeitung and Reichsruf and was a regular contributor to Nation Europa - a journal for which he sat on a five-man board of associate editors. His work for these journals focused mainly on the exoneration of the SS and Nazi Germany and attacks on the Allies and Israel.

== Neo-Nazi activism ==
Kern was a supporter of the pan-European nationalism that became important in post-war far right politics and was a regular contributor to Europe-Action, a journal devoted to this ideal controlled by the Fédération des étudiants nationalistes of Dominique Venner. Active in far-right German politics, he served as a member of the neo-Nazi Socialist Reich Party, the National Democratic Party of Germany and the German People's Union. As an NPD member he was active in ultimately failed attempts to unite the German far right during the early 1970s. He was also active in the Deutsches Kulturwerk Europäischen Geistes, a German cultural organisation founded by Herbert Böhme.

In the 1950s, Kern joined HIAG, a post-war historical negationist lobby group for former Waffen-SS men. He first became active within HIAG in 1955, and then joined as a full-time employee in 1959. Kern became the organisation's key employee responsible for its publishing arm. According to the historian Jonathan Petropoulos, Kern remained an "unrepentant and unreconstructed Nazi" up to his death in 1991.

== Death ==
Kern died in Kammer am Attersee.

== Publications ==
Kern was a prolific author and despite his Nazi pedigree, was able to achieve a certain amount of literary success. His works include:

- Der Marsch ins Nichts, Novel. Paul Zsolnay Verlag, Berlin 1938
- Der Tag unseres Lebens, Roman eines österreichischen Arbeiters. Paul Zsolnay Verlag, Berlin 1938
- Steirische Novellen. Paul Zsolnay Verlag, Berlin 1939
- Fahne im Sturm. Erzählungen. Deutscher Verl. für Jugend u. Volk, Wien 1940
- Das goldene Tor. Novellen aus Metz. Buchgewerbehaus, Saarbrücken 1941
- Der verratene Berg. Steirische Novellen. Wiener Verl., Wien 1943.
- Feuer im Westen. Novellen vom Rhein und von der Mosel. Westmark-Verl., Ludwigshafen am Rhein 1943.
- Der große Rausch. Rußlandfeldzug 1941-1945. Thomas-Verl, Zürich 1948.
- Das andere Lidice. Die Tragödie der Sudetendeutschen. Verl. Welsermühl, Wels 1950.
- Insel der Tapferen. Roman. Verl. Welsermühl, Wels 1951.
- Buch der Tapferkeit. Druffel-Verlag, Leoni 1953.
- Die Uhr blieb stehen. Verlag Welsermühl, Wels 1953.
- Der Dorn im Fleische. Roman der Fremdenlegion. Verl. Welsermühl, Wels 1955.
- Das goldene Feld. Roman aus der Ukraine. Schild-Verlag, München 1957.
- Menschen im Netz. Roman. Verlag Welsermühl, München 1957.
- Stadt ohne Gnade. Ein Roman um Berlin. Verlag Welsermühl, München 1959.
- Das große Kesseltreiben. Bleibt der deutsche Soldat vogelfrei? 2. Auflage. Plesse-Verlag, Göttingen 1960.
- Der Tag des Gerichts. Türmer-Verlag, München 1961.
- Von Versailles zu Adolf Hitler. Der schreckliche Friede. K.W.Schütz-Verlag, Göttingen 1961.
- Opfergang eines Volkes. Der totale Krieg. 2. Auflage. K.W.Schütz-Verlag, Göttingen 1963.
- General Von Pannwitz und seine Kosaken. 3. Auflage. Kurt Vowinckel Verlag, Neckargemünd 1963.
- Deutschland im Abgrund. Das falsche Gericht. K.W.Schütz-Verlag, Göttingen 1963.
- Verbrechen am deutschen Volk. Dokumente alliierter Grausamkeiten 1939 - 1949. 6. Auflage. K.W.Schütz-Verlag, Göttingen 1964.
- Weder Frieden noch Freiheit. Deutsches Schicksal unserer Zeit. K.W.Schütz-Verlag, Göttingen 1965
- Der Sieg der Soldaten. K.W.Schütz-Verlag, Göttingen 1969.
- Von Versailles nach Nürnberg. Der Opfergang des deutschen Volkes. 3. Auflage. K.W.Schütz-Verlag, Göttingen 1971.
- Meineid gegen Deutschland. Eine Dokumentation über den politischen Betrug. 2. Auflage. K.W.Schütz-Verlag, Göttingen 1971.
- Adolf Hitler und seine Bewegung. Der Parteiführer. 2. Auflage. K.W.Schütz-Verlag, Preußisch Oldendorf 1970.
- Adolf Hitler und der Krieg, Der Feldherr. 3. Auflage. PK.W.Schütz-Verlag, Preußisch Oldendorf 1978, ISBN 3-87725-003-3.
- Adolf Hitler und das Dritte Reich. Der Staatsmann. 3. Auflage. K.W.Schütz-Verlag, Preußisch Oldendorf 1983, ISBN 3-87725-002-5.
- Willy Brandt - Schein und Wirklichkeit. Eine Dokumentation. National-Verlag, Rosenheim 1973, ISBN 3-920722-18-3.
- So wurde Deutschland verraten. Eine Dokumentation über den Verrat im 2. Weltkrieg. 2. Auflage. Deutsche Verlagsgesellschaft, Rosenheim 1974, ISBN 3-920722-06-X.
- Verrat an Deutschland, Spione und Saboteure gegen das eigene Vaterland. 4. Auflage. K.W.Schütz-Verlag, Preußisch Oldendorf 1976.
- SPD - ohne Maske. Eine politische Dokumentation. 7. Auflage. Deutsche Verlagsgesellschaft, Rosenheim 1976, ISBN 3-920722-01-9.
- Die Tragödie der Juden. Schicksal zwischen Propaganda und Wahrheit. K.W.Schütz-Verlag, Preußisch Oldendorf 1979, ISBN 3-87725-093-9.
- Alliierte Verbrechen an Deutschen. Die verschwiegenen Opfer. (Mit Karl Balzer) K.W.Schütz-Verlag, Preußisch Oldendorf 1980, ISBN 3-87725-096-3.
- Verbrechen am deutschen Volk. Eine Dokumentation alliierter Grausamkeit. 8. Auflage. K.W.Schütz-Verlag, Preußisch Oldendorf 1983. ISBN 3-87725-040-8.
- Die letzte Schlacht. Kampf in der Puszta zwischen Budapest und Plattensee Ungarn 1944 - 45. 3. Auflage, K.W.Schütz-Verlag, Preußisch Oldendorf 1985, ISBN 3-87725-016-5.
- Generalfeldmarschall Ferdinand Schörner. Ein deutsches Soldatenschicksal. Deutsche Verlags-Gesellschaft, Rosenheim 1994, ISBN 3-920722-15-9.
- Verheimlichte Dokumente. Was Deutschen verschwiegen wird. 2. Auflage. FZ-Verlag, München 1999, ISBN 3-924309-08-6.
