= Army Group G =

- German: Armeegruppe G Heeresgruppe G
- Active: 28 April 1944 – 5 May 1945
- Country: Nazi Germany
- Branch: Heer ( Wehrmacht)

Commanders
- Notable commanders: Johannes Blaskowitz; Hermann Balck; Paul Hausser; Friedrich Schulz

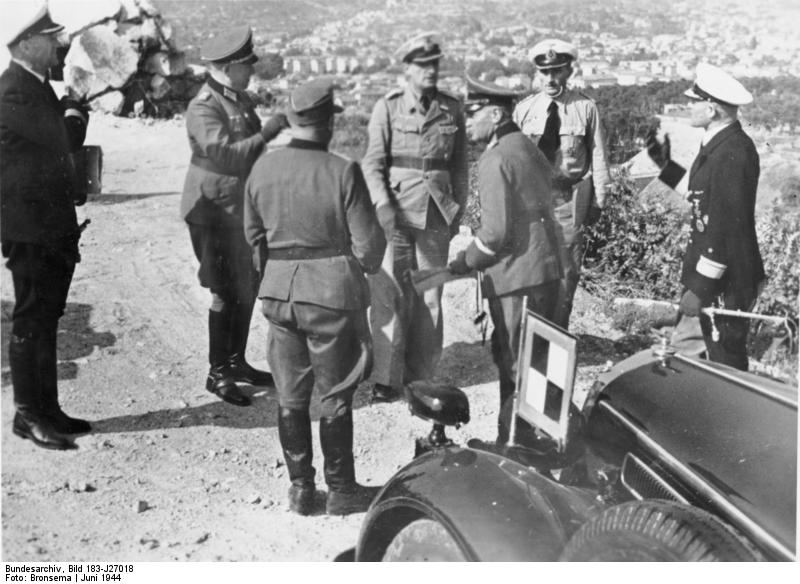
Generaloberst Blaskowitz inspects defenses in Southern France, June 1944. The car flag denotes the commander of an army group.

Army Group G (German: Armeegruppe G / Heeresgruppe G) fought on the Western Front of World War II and was a component of OB West.

== History ==
Army Group G was initially deployed as an Armeegruppe-type formation on 28 April 1944, but was later upgraded to Heeresgruppe-type on 12 September 1944.

When the Allied invasion of Southern France took place, Army Group G had eleven divisions with which to hold France south of the Loire. Between August 17 and 18, the German Armed Forces High Command ordered Army Group G (with the exception of the troops holding the fortress ports) to abandon southern France. German LXIV Corps, in command in the southwest since First Army had been withdrawn a few weeks earlier to hold the line on the River Seine southeast of Paris, formed three march groups and withdrew eastward toward Dijon. At the same time, the German Nineteenth Army retreated northward through the Rhône valley toward the Plateau de Langres. There it was joined by the German Fifth Panzer Army, which was assigned to Army Group G for a counter-attack against the United States Third Army. The retreat did not go according to plan: as the Nineteenth Army retreated, many personnel of Army Group G were taken prisoner by the Sixth United States Army Group. By the time the retreat was over General Johannes Blaskowitz had lost about half his force. He was relieved on 21 September by General Hermann Balck. By mid-September. Fifth Panzer was positioned on the left wing of the German line north of the Swiss border. From there, Fifth Panzer with elements of First Army attacked US Third Army, while the much reduced 19th Army opposed the French First Army and the United States Seventh Army.

Army Group G fought in the Vosges Mountains during November 1944 and retreated through Lorraine and north Alsace during December. In late November 1944, Army Group G temporarily lost responsibility for the German troops in the Colmar Pocket and on the Rhine River south of the Bienwald to the short-lived Army Group Oberrhein. In January 1945 the Army Group attacked in Operation Nordwind ("North Wind"), the last big German counter-attack on the Western Front. With the failure of Nordwind and the ejection of the Germans from the Colmar Pocket, Army Group Oberrhein was dissolved and Army Group G reassumed responsibility for the defense of southwestern Germany.

Unable to halt the offensive by Allied troops that cleared the Rhineland-Palatinate and subsequently assaulted over the Rhine River, Army Group G's troops nevertheless fought to defend the cities of Heilbronn, Crailsheim, Nuremberg, and Munich during April 1945.

Army Group G surrendered to U.S. forces at Haar, in Bavaria, in Germany on May 5, 1945.

== Commanders ==
The following persons served as commanders of the group.

No.	Portrait	Commander	Took office	Left office	Time in office
1	Johannes Blaskowitz	Generaloberst; Johannes Blaskowitz (1883–1948)	8 May 1944	21 September 1944	136 days
2	Hermann Balck	General der Panzertruppe; Hermann Balck (1893–1982)	21 September 1944	24 December 1944	94 days
(1)	Johannes Blaskowitz	Generaloberst; Johannes Blaskowitz (1883–1948)	24 December 1944	29 January 1945	36 days
3	Paul Hausser	SS-Oberst-Gruppenführer; Paul Hausser (1880–1972)	29 January 1945	2 April 1945	63 days
4	Friedrich Schulz	General der Infanterie; Friedrich Schulz (1897–1976)	2 April 1945	5 May 1945	33 days

== Order of battle ==
Army Group Headquarters troops
Army group signals regiment 606
Subordinated units
1944
May 1944	First Army, Nineteenth Army
August 1944	Nineteenth Army
September 1944	Nineteenth Army, First Army, Fifth Panzer Army
1945
January 1945	First Army
February 1945	First Army, Nineteenth Army
March 1945	First Army, Seventh Army, Nineteenth Army
April 1945	First Army, Nineteenth Army
