= Simon MacKenzie =

Military historian

S. P. MacKenzie, is a military historian, author and retired academic, currently resident in Canada. He was educated at the University of Toronto and received a DPhil from the University of Oxford. He was co-winner of the Templer Medal, awarded by the Society for Army Historical Research ("for the book which in the Society's view has made the greatest contribution to the study of British military history") for his first book, Politics and Military Morale: Current-Affairs and Citizenship Education in the British Army 1914–1950.

== Works ==
- RAF Aircrew at War: A Sensory History, 1939-1945, Oxford University Press 2026
- Inchon, Oxford University Press, 2025
- Bomber Boys on Screen: RAF Bomber Command in Film and Television Drama, Bloomsbury, 2019
- Flying Against Fate: Superstition and Allied Aircrews in World War II, University Press of Kansas, 2017
- The Battle of Britain on Screen: 'The Few' in British Film and Television Drama, Bloomsbury, 2016
- The Imjin and Kapyong Battles, Korea 1951, Indiana University Press, 2013
- British Prisoners of the Korean War, Oxford University Press, 2012
- Bader's War: 'Have a Go at Everything', Spellmount, 2008
- The Second World War in Europe, Longman, 2009
- British War Films, 1939-1945: The Cinema and the Services, Continuum, 2006
- The Colditz Myth: British and Commonwealth Prisoners of War in Nazi Germany, Oxford University Press, 2004
- Revolutionary Armies in the Modern Era: A Revisionist Approach, Routledge, 1997
- The Home Guard: A Military and Political History, Oxford University Press, 1995
- Politics and Military Morale: Current-Affairs and Citizenship Education in the British Army, 1914-1950, Oxford University Press, 1992.
