= Army Group Upper Rhine =

German army group that attempted to defend Alsace during WW2

High Command Upper Rhine Army Group Upper Rhine
- German: Oberkommando Oberrhein; Heeresgruppe Oberrhein
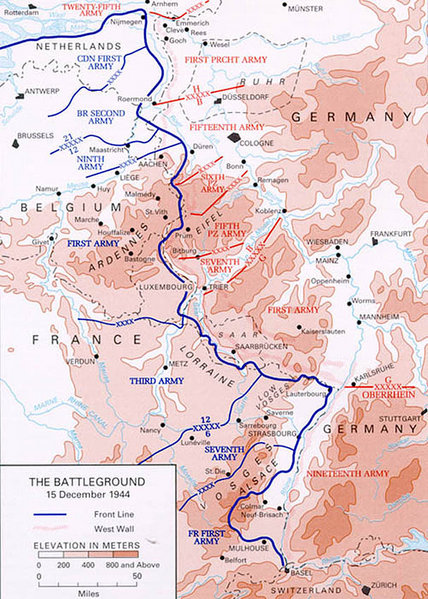
- The situation at the Upper Rhine on 15 December 1944; Upper Rhine High Command is seen as XXXXX OBERRHEIN near to Karlsruhe.
- Active: 26 November 1944 – 29 January 1945
- Country: Nazi Germany
- Branch: German Army
- Type: Army group
- Engagements: Western Front

Commanders
- Notable commanders: Heinrich Himmler; Paul Hausser

The Upper Rhine High Command (German: Oberkommando Oberrhein), known for three days as Army Group Upper Rhine (German: Heeresgruppe Oberrhein), was a short-lived headquarters unit of the German Armed Forces (Wehrmacht) created on the Western Front during World War II. The Upper Rhine High Command was formed on 26 November 1944 and deactivated on 25 January 1945. The sole commander of this headquarters unit was Heinrich Himmler.

For most of its history, the command was known as an Oberkommando, and was renamed to become a Heeresgruppe only on 22 January 1945, when Paul Hausser was appointed as commander. Just three days later, on 25 January, Hausser was assigned to Army Group G; Army Group Upper Rhine was dissolved on 29 January.

== Creation ==
Following successful Allied offensives in November 1944 that forced the Saverne and Belfort Gaps, reached the Rhine River, and liberated Belfort, Strasbourg, and Mulhouse, Hitler ordered the German troops around Colmar in Alsace to hold fast. German Army Group G (Heeresgruppe G) was stripped of defense responsibility for the area around Colmar and the defense of the Rhine River south of the Bienwald.

On 26 November 1944 the Germans organized the Upper Rhine High Command to defend the upper Rhine. Hitler placed SS Reichsführer Heinrich Himmler in command on 10 December, believing that Himmler's presence would stimulate extraordinary efforts by both German military and Nazi Party officials in the region.

The designation of the command as a "High Command" also meant that the Upper Rhine High Command was an independent theater-level command that answered directly to OKW, rather than to the OB West. OB West was the German command responsible for the rest of the Western Front. With Himmler in charge of the Upper Rhine High Command, the practical effect was that this army group answered directly to Hitler. This introduced a largely disadvantageous schism into the German high command for operations on the Western Front.

== Organization ==
The Upper Rhine High Command controlled the German Nineteenth Army as well as several regiments of the German Replacement Army (Ersatzheer) that were mobilized by Military District V (Wehrkreis V) as an emergency measure in reaction to the successful Allied offensives of November 1944.

== The battle for Alsace ==
On 16 December 1944 the Germans attacked in the Ardennes. What became known as the "Battle of the Bulge" forced the movement of large numbers of U.S. troops north out of Alsace and Lorraine to counter the German attack. In January, additional U.S. troops were moved north in response to the German counter-offensive into northern Alsace, Operation North Wind (Unternehmen Nordwind). Taking advantage of the stretched Allied lines, Himmler ordered the recapture of Strasbourg. German troops assaulted across the Rhine near Gambsheim on 5 January 1945 and soon occupied a bridgehead including the towns of Herrlisheim, Drusenheim, and Offendorf north of Strasbourg. South of Strasbourg, German troops in the Colmar Pocket attacked north toward Strasbourg on 7 January, inflicting painful losses on the French II Corps, but were ultimately unable to break the French defense.

Reinforced by elements of the 10th SS Panzer Division, the German troops in the Gambsheim Bridgehead held their own against U.S. and French counterattacks during January 1945, manhandling the U.S. 12th Armored Division at Herrlisheim. The German successes of January, however, marked the high point for the Upper Rhine High Command. The Gambsheim Bridgehead, and further to the south, the Colmar Pocket, would not be reduced by Allied forces until well into February 1945, but the operations of the Upper Rhine High Command after mid-January were defensive in nature.

== Inactivation ==
With the defeat of Operation North Wind and the impending collapse of the Colmar Pocket, the Upper Rhine High Command was inactivated on 24 January 1945, and the responsibility for the defense of the upper Rhine region was again returned to Army Group G. The staff of the Upper Rhine High Command was used to staff the newly formed Eleventh SS Panzer Army on the Eastern Front. Heinrich Himmler was sent to command Army Group Vistula (Heeresgruppe Weichsel), also on the Eastern Front.

== Commanders ==
No.	Portrait	Commander	Took office	Left office	Time in office
1	Heinrich Himmler	Reichsführer-SS; Heinrich Himmler (1900–1945)	10 December 1944	24 January 1945	45 days
2	Paul Hausser	SS-Oberst-Gruppenführer; Paul Hausser (1880–1972)	24 January 1945	29 January 1945	5 days

== See also ==
- Colmar Pocket

== Sources ==
- Kriegstagebuch des Oberkommandos der Wehrmacht, 1944-1945 Teilband I, Percy E. Schramm, Herrsching: Manfred Pawlak, 1982.
- Riviera to the Rhine, Jeffrey J. Clarke and Robert Ross Smith, Washington: Government Printing Office, 1993.
- Verbände und Truppen der deutschen Wehrmacht und Waffen-SS 1939-1945. Die Waffengattungen - Gesamtübersicht, Georg Tessin, Osnabrück: Biblio Verlag, 1973.
- Tessin, Georg (1980). Die Landstreitkräfte: Namensverbände / Die Luftstreitkräfte (Fliegende Verbände) / Flakeinsatz im Reich 1943–1945 [Ground forces: Named units and formations / Air forces (Flying units and formations) / Anti–aircraft service in the Reich 1943–1945] (in German). Vol. 14. Osnabrück: Biblio. ISBN 3-7648-1111-0.
