= Army Liguria =

Army Group Liguria
- German: Armee Ligurien; Italian: Armata Liguria
- Active: 31 July 1944 – 1 May 1945
- Country: Italian Social Republic
- Branch: National Republican Army; Heer ( Wehrmacht)
- Type: Field army
- Engagements: Italian campaign: Gothic Line; Spring 1945 offensive in Italy

Commanders
- Notable commanders: Rodolfo Graziani

Army Liguria (German: Armee Ligurien, Italian: Armata Liguria, or LXXXXVII Army) was an army formed for the National Republican Army (Esercito Nazionale Repubblicano, or ENR). The ENR was the national army of Italian dictator Benito Mussolini's Italian Social Republic (Repubblica Sociale Italiana, or RSI). Formation of this RSI army started in 1943 and the army was disbanded in 1945. Army Liguria included several German units and its Italian units were sometimes transferred to German formations.

Between November 1944 and February 1945, the formation was alternatively known as Army Group Liguria (Armeegruppe Ligurien) due to the subordination of 14th Army under it.

== Formation ==
On 16 October 1943, the Rastenburg Protocol was signed with Nazi Germany and the RSI was allowed to raise four division-sized military formations. The four divisions—1st Italian "Italia" Infantry Division, 2nd Italian "Littorio" Infantry Division, 3rd Italian "San Marco" Marine Division, and 4th Italian "Monte Rosa" Alpine Division—were to ultimately total 52,000 men.

== Service ==
In July 1944, the first of these divisions completed training and was sent to the front. Like the smaller RSI units—the Black Brigades and the Decima Flottiglia MAS—the newly formed RSI divisions generally participated in anti-partisan activities. While there were exceptions, these divisions saw front line actions against the Allies, especially at the Gothic Line.

As the remaining divisions completed training, they were combined with German units and formed into Army Group Liguria. The RSI Minister of Defense, Rodolfo Graziani, commanded all Army forces of the RSI.

On 1 May 1945, the Army Group Liguria surrendered after being defeated at the Spring 1945 offensive in Italy.

== Order of battle ==
- Order of Battle for the LXXXXVII "Liguria" Army - as of 30 April 1945

Army Group Liguria - (Marshal Rodolfo Graziani)

  - Lombardia Corps (General Kurt Jahn)
    - 3rd Italian "San Marco" Marine Infantry Division
    - 134th German Infantry Brigade
  - LXXV Corps (General Hans Schlemmer)
    - 2nd Italian "Littorio" Infantry Division
    - 4th Italian "Monte Rosa" Alpine Division
    - 5th German Mountain Division
    - 34th German Infantry Division

The 1st Bersaglieri "Italia" Division was attached to the 14th German Army.

== See also ==
- List of German Army Groups in World War II
- Italian Co-Belligerent Army
- Alfredo Guzzoni
- Gothic Line order of battle
- Operation Grapeshot order of battle
- Battle of Garfagnana
