= Defense of Schwedt Bridgehead =

German 3rd Panzer Army operation on the Eastern Front during World War II

- Part of World War II
Date	February 1 – March 3, 1945
Location	Schwedt, Germany
Result	Successful Soviet deception

Belligerents
Germany	Soviet Union

Commanders and leaders
Heinrich Himmler; Otto Skorzeny	Konstantin Rokossovsky

Strength
Originally a Kampfgruppe, later XI SS Panzer Corps	Deception by 2nd Guards Tank Army, supported by 61st and 49th Armies

The defense of the Schwedt bridgehead was a German 3rd Panzer Army operation on the Eastern Front during the final months of World War II. German forces, commanded by Otto Skorzeny, were ordered to prepare to conduct a counter-offensive. However they were forced to hold a bridgehead against expected numerically superior forces of the Soviet 2nd Belorussian Front (Marshal Konstantin Rokossovsky) for 31 days. Their position was largely ignored during the Red Army's Cottbus–Potsdam Offensive Operation which breached German defenses at Gartz to the north of Schwedt. This was unexpected because it required the Red Army to cross the Randowbruch Swamp that lay between the Oder and Randow rivers.

== Background ==
The Germans feared that the advancing Red Army would cross the frozen Oder at Schwedt, about 60 miles north-east of Berlin. The Commander-in-chief of Army Group Vistula, Heinrich Himmler, was planning a counter-offensive from Schwedt. On January 30, 1945, he ordered SS-Standartenführer Otto Skorzeny to prepare for the offensive.

== Preparations ==
The rapid advance of the Red Army meant that when Skorzeny set up his command post on the right bank of the Oder in Niederkränig (some three kilometers south-east of Schwedt), rather than preparing for a counter-offensive, he was forced to order that the first week be spent by troops of the newly created 11th Army preparing fortified positions while others were concentrated for the offensive. The position was prepared according to typical Wehrmacht doctrine some 20 km forward of the river, and strengthened with machine gun nests and reinforced trenches.

Despite ostensibly preparing for an offensive, the 3rd Panzer Army troops, including the X SS Corps, were short of supplies and weapons, lacking heavy machine guns and artillery. Makeshift artillery was produced by mounting anti-aircraft guns on trucks. It proved useful in harassing the Red Army's 61st Army by giving them the impression that the Germans had large artillery units. After the ice on the Oder was blown up by pioneers to make crossing more difficult for the advancing Red Army tanks, a similar strategy was employed using guns mounted on river barges. Skorzeny later credited this use of mobile artillery with gaining enough time to sufficiently fortify the bridgehead. The initial troops began to arrive early in February from the Courland Pocket, they included the 4th Panzer Division, the 32nd and 227th Infantry divisions, elements of the XVI SS Corps, and other SS units.

== Battle at the bridgehead ==
The first encounter battles were between the screening German infantry, and the 2nd Guards Tank Army on 28 January, which "was pouring now like a torrent north of [the] Netze River towards Küstrin", when elements of the 9th Guards Tank Corps probed the positions of Kampfgruppe Voigt (Generalmajor Adolf Voigt) east of Pyritz and 18 km east of Schwedt. As the 2nd Guards Tank Army turned towards Küstrin, the encounters between patrols from the German 56th Jäger Regiment (CI Army Corps) and the Red Army's 89th Rifle Corps on February 1 intensified. As of February 5 the number of Red and Polish Armies' forces had grown so much that German probes behind enemy lines were no longer possible. Once the 2nd Belorussian Front troops had captured the railway in Bad Schönfliess, they received a steady flow of reinforcements by train. However, unbeknown to Skorzeny, the Red Army reinforcements were those belonging to the 61st Army and the 1st Polish Army of the 1st Belorussian Front's northern flank. They had orders to bypass Schwedt and attack in the direction of Eberswalde. They also masked the movement of the 2nd Belorussian Front's 49th Army which would attack north of Schwedt. Extensive deception operations, and the rapid tempo of advance meant that the German command was largely unaware of the switch in forces, or the true direction of the impending assaults. For much of the time they were under the impression they were facing a major armored thrust while the 2nd Guards Tank Army was replaced in line by the 5th Shock Army, including the preparation of 136 T-34 mock-ups. These deceptive measures were hampered by the previous deception conducted by Zhukov in the final stage of the Vistula-Oder Strategic Offensive Operation.

After fighting to the north of their position, the 9th Army, which had replaced the 3rd Panzer Army, had to fall back from its forward defenses and on February 7 the evacuation of all villages outside the bridgehead began. Two Red Army battalions supported by T-34 tanks conducted a daily reconnaissance in force as this evacuation took place.

On March 3 9th German Army forces abandoned the Schwedt bridgehead, having fruitlessly awaited the orders for a counter-offensive and not having witnessed the expected Soviet attack on their positions for over a month, had assumed new positions on the western banks of the Oder.

== Aftermath ==
The Soviets captured Schwedt on 26 April after German troops had withdrawn to avoid encirclement following the commencement of the Cottbus-Potsdam Offensive Operation on the 19 April; by then the city was severely damaged. The commander of the XI SS Panzer Corps later stated that there was no strategic purpose in the defense of the bridgehead, but that it served a tactical defensive role and misled the advancing Soviet armies into believing that the Germans were preparing a counter-offensive.

== 9th Army order of battle (15 April) ==
The order of battle was largely the same as that of the forces being assembled for the expected offensive although the Army subordinations were changed several times. They come from Zhukov at the Oder: The Decisive Battle for Berlin by Tony Le Tissier.

CI Army Corps

5th Jäger Division
606th Infantry Division
309th Infantry Division "Berlin"

XXXIX Panzer Corps (LVI Panzer Corps)

25th Panzergrenadier Division
Müncheberg Panzer Division

XI SS Panzer Corps

9th Fallschirmjäger Division
20th Panzergrenadier Division
303rd Infantry Division "Döberitz"
169th Infantry Division
712th Infantry Division
Kurmark Panzergrenadier Division

V SS Mountain Corps

286th Infantry Division
32nd SS Volunteer Grenadier Division "30th January"
391st Security Division

Other forces:

Frankfurt/Oder Fortress Division
600th (Russian) Infantry Division

== Sources ==
- Le Tissier, Tony, Zhukov at the Oder: The Decisive Battle for Berlin, Greenwood Publishing Group, 1996
- Glantz, David M., 1986 Art of War symposium, From the Vistula to the Oder: Soviet Offensive Operations - October 1944 - March 1945, A transcript of Proceedings, Center for Land Warfare, US Army War College, 19–23 May 1986
- Glantz (1), David M., Soviet Military Deception in the Second World War, Frank Cass, London, (1989)
