= CI Army Corps =

- CI. Armeekorps
- Active: 9 February 1945 – May 1945
- Country: Nazi Germany
- Branch: Heer (Wehrmacht)
- Role: Infantry
- Size: Corps
- Garrison/HQ: Berlin

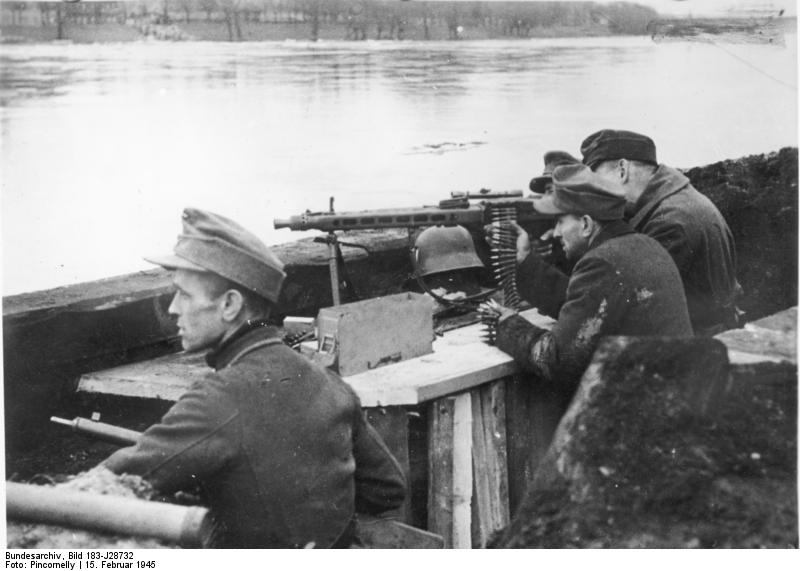
German machine-gun position on the banks of the Oder, February 15, 1945

The CI Army Corps (German: CI. Armeekorps), alternatively also referred to as Roman 101st Corps (German: röm. 101. Armeekorps), (Note: The word Roman (German: römisch) here indicates Roman numerals (i.e. the spelling of the number 101 as CI), and is not related to the city of Rome. Because of the (to the average soldier) confusing nature of Roman numerals, the name of the army corps was often mistakenly read as 'C eins' ('C one') rather than 101. It became a practice to avoid the Roman numeral and to instead write 'röm[isch]. 101', 'Roman 101'.) was a corps-level unit of the German Wehrmacht during World War II. It existed only for a few months during the year 1945.

== History ==
The CI Army Corps was formed in early February 1945 in Wehrkreis III (Berlin) as Korpsstab Berlin. On 9 February 1945, it was redesignated Generalkommando CI. Armeekorps, the highest numbered German army corps formed during the war. It was deployed in the Oder-Küstrin area as a subordinate of the 9th Army (Busse), which was in turn under the command of Army Group Vistula (Himmler). It was one of the last newly formed army corps of the Wehrmacht, along with XXXII Army Corps. All new corps that followed after it were mobilizations, not completely new creations.

Wilhelm Berlin, who the initial organization Korpsstab Berlin was named after, was the initial commander of CI Army Corps. At the end of the war, the corps would be commanded by Friedrich Sixt. The literature conflicts on when command was passed from one to the other. (Note: MacLean puts the transfer of command from Berlin to Sixt on 18 April 1945. [See MacLean 2014 p. 121] Zaloga lists Sixt as the corps commander on the German order of battle on 12 April 1945. [See Zaloga 2016, p. 24] Zaloga also names him as the corps commander in an image caption of a photograph dated 3 March 1945. [See Zaloga 2016, p. 14] However, at least that last date seems to be definitely incorrect, as Sixt received the Knight's Cross of the Iron Cross with Oak Leaves on 11 March 1945 while still the commander of the 5th Jäger Division. [See Fellgiebel 2000, p. 82] The discrepancy is further complicated by the possibility that Zaloga gave the wrong date for the printed photograph, as the visit that the photograph depicts might also have happened on 22 March 1945. [See Mcateer 2009, p. 378] Zaloga 2016 is the only source that conflicts with the others.)

The units under its initial command, listed in the documents of its superior unit, the 9th Army, were Division z. b. V. 606 (also known as 606th Infantry Division), 303rd "Döberitz" Infantry Division and 309th "(Groß-)Berlin" Infantry Division, making it an army corps of nominally three divisions. This first listing is dated 19 February 1945, and does not change on 1 March 1945. However, on 12 April 1945, within a month to surrender, the division 303 "Döberitz" was transferred to XI SS Panzer Corps (Kleinheisterkamp), whereas the CI Army Corps was strengthened with the 5th Jäger Division, which meant that the CI Army Corps at the time of surrender on 8 May 1945 consisted of the 5th Jäger Division, 309th Infantry Division and 606th Infantry Division.

On 22 March 1945, the units of the CI Army Corps were visited personally by Adolf Hitler in one of Hitler's last public appearances and his very last visit to frontline troops before his suicide on 30 April 1945. The visit came about partially because of the desire of Joseph Goebbels for a "photo opportunity" involving the dictator and German soldiers. Hitler, visibly weakened, rushed through the visit and hurriedly left the frontline with his staff car. (Note: Zaloga puts the date of Hitler's last visit to CI Army Corps on 3 March 1945 instead. [See Zaloga 2016, p. 14])

By 12 April, Busse's 9th Army consisted of CI Army Corps, as well as LVI Panzer Corps (Weidling), XI SS Panzer Corps (Kleinheisterkamp) and V SS Mountain Corps (Friedrich Jeckeln). By now, Himmler had been replaced as commander of Army Group Vistula by Gotthard Heinrici.

During the Battle of Seelow heights (16 April – 19 April 1945), the CI Army Corps defended the northern sector of the 9th Army. It was under attack by the Red Army's 47th Army (Perkhorovich) and 3rd Shock Army (Kuznetsov), whereas the XI SS Panzer Corps to the CI Army Corps's right was attacked by the Soviet 8th Guards Army (Chuikov). On the right flank of CI Army Corps, the 309th and 606th Infantry Divisions had to give way to the thrusting forces of 47th Army and the 3rd Shock Army.

In the last days of the war, CI Army Corps fought alongside the III SS Panzer Corps under 21st Army (von Tippelskirch), which was formed on 27 April 1945 in a desperate attempt to win the Battle of Berlin.

== Noteworthy individuals ==
- Wilhelm Berlin, first corps commander at 27 February 1945. End of tenure unclear.
- Friedrich Sixt, second and final corps commander. Beginning of tenure unclear.
