= Infantry Division Ulrich von Hutten =

- Infanterie-Division Ulrich von Hutten
- Active: 30 March 1945 – May 1945
- Country: Nazi Germany
- Branch: Heer (Wehrmacht)
- Type: Infantry
- Part of: 11th Army; 12th Army
- Patron: Ulrich von Hutten

Commanders
- Notable commanders: Edmund Blaurock; Gerhard Engel

The Infantry Division Ulrich von Hutten was an infantry division of the German Wehrmacht during World War II, comprising the Army (Heer), Navy (Kriegsmarine), and Air Force (Luftwaffe). The Wehrmacht had numerous divisions, including infantry, armored, and other specialized units, which were involved in various military campaigns throughout the war. It was formed at the end of March 1945, just over a month before the end of the war. The division was named after German Protestant reformer Ulrich von Hutten (1488–1523).

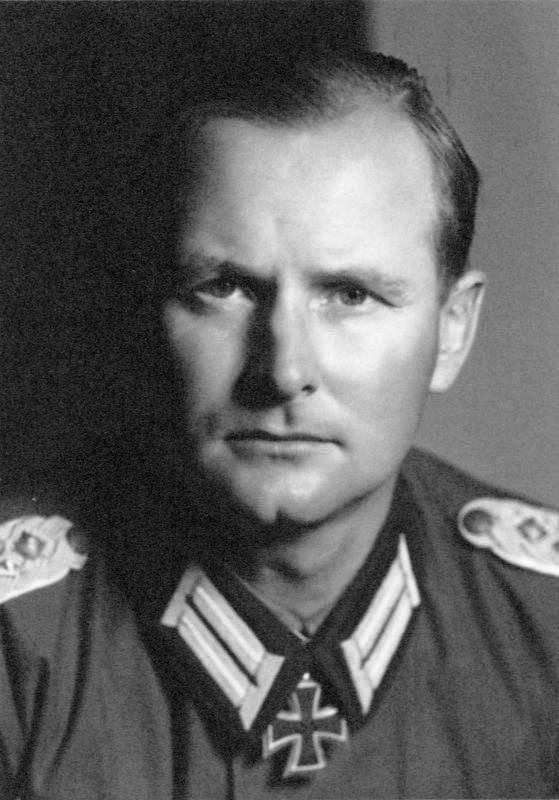
Gerhard Engel commanded the division from 13 April until surrender

== History ==
The Infantry Division Ulrich von Hutten was formed on 30 March 1945 in Wittenberg in Wehrkreis IV. The Ulrich von Hutten Division was part of the 35th and final Aufstellungswelle of the German Wehrmacht. It was formed from students of various schools from all over Wehrkreis IV, as well as military replacement personnel. Many soldiers of the 190th Infantry Division were used to staff the Ulrich von Hutten Division. After 13 April 1945, Gerhard Engel became divisional commander, and remained in this post until war's end.

The division saw its first combat near Bitterfeld as part of the 11th Army. It was then moved to the 12th Army in preparation of the planned liberation of the encircled German capital, Berlin. The 12th Army reached Potsdam, but was then rerouted by its commander Walther Wenck to assist the 9th Army, commanded by Theodor Busse, which had sustained heavy damage in combat against the Red Army at the Battle of Halbe. The 9th and 12th Armies then turned west towards the Elbe river with the intention to surrender to the United States Army rather than the Soviet forces. The German formations as well as the civilians they escorted sustained heavy casualties, but ultimately fulfilled that goal.

As part of the 12th Army's surrender to the American forces, the Infantry Division Ulrich von Hutten was taken prisoner at Tangermünde in May 1945.

== Noteworthy individuals ==
- Edmund Blaurock, divisional commander from 29 March 1945 to 13 April 1945.
- Gerhard Engel, divisional commander from 13 April 1945 until surrender.
