= 303rd Infantry Division (Wehrmacht) =

- 303. Infanterie-Division
- Active: January 1945 - April 1945
- Country: Nazi Germany
- Branch: Army
- Type: Infantry
- Role: Division
- Engagements: World War II: Battle of the Seelow Heights; Battle of Halbe

The 303rd Infantry Division (German: 303. Infanterie-Division), also dubbed Infantry Division "Döberitz" (German: Infanterie-Division "Döberitz"), was an infantry division of the German Heer during World War II.

== History ==
The Infantry Division Döberitz was formed in Military Training Area Döberitz on 31 January 1945. Initially, the division did not carry an ordinal number, but was eventually assigned the number 303. The divisional staff was recruited from the staff of the former 611th Special Purpose (z.b.V.) Division. The division's initial commander was Rudolf Hübner.

Upon formation, the Infantry Division Döberitz consisted of the following parts by early February:

- Grenadier Regiment 300
- Grenadier Regiment 301
- Grenadier Regiment 303
- Division Fusilier Battalion 303
- Artillery Regiment 303
- Division Units 303, Reconnaissance Detachment 1303

The three Grenadier Regiments consisted of two battalions each, whereas the Artillery Regiment consisted of four batteries.

In March 1945, the division was assigned to the CI Army Corps under 9th Army, part of Army Group Vistula. By April, the division was transferred to the XI SS Panzer Corps, also part of the 9th Army. Beginning on 9 March 1945, the division was commanded by a colonel (Oberst) rank officer named Hans-Wolfgang Scheunemann.

In April 1945, at the rear end of the Battle of the Seelow Heights, the division was trapped in the cauldron of the Battle of Halbe and subsequently forced to surrender.
