= Willy Langkeit =

German general (1907–1969)

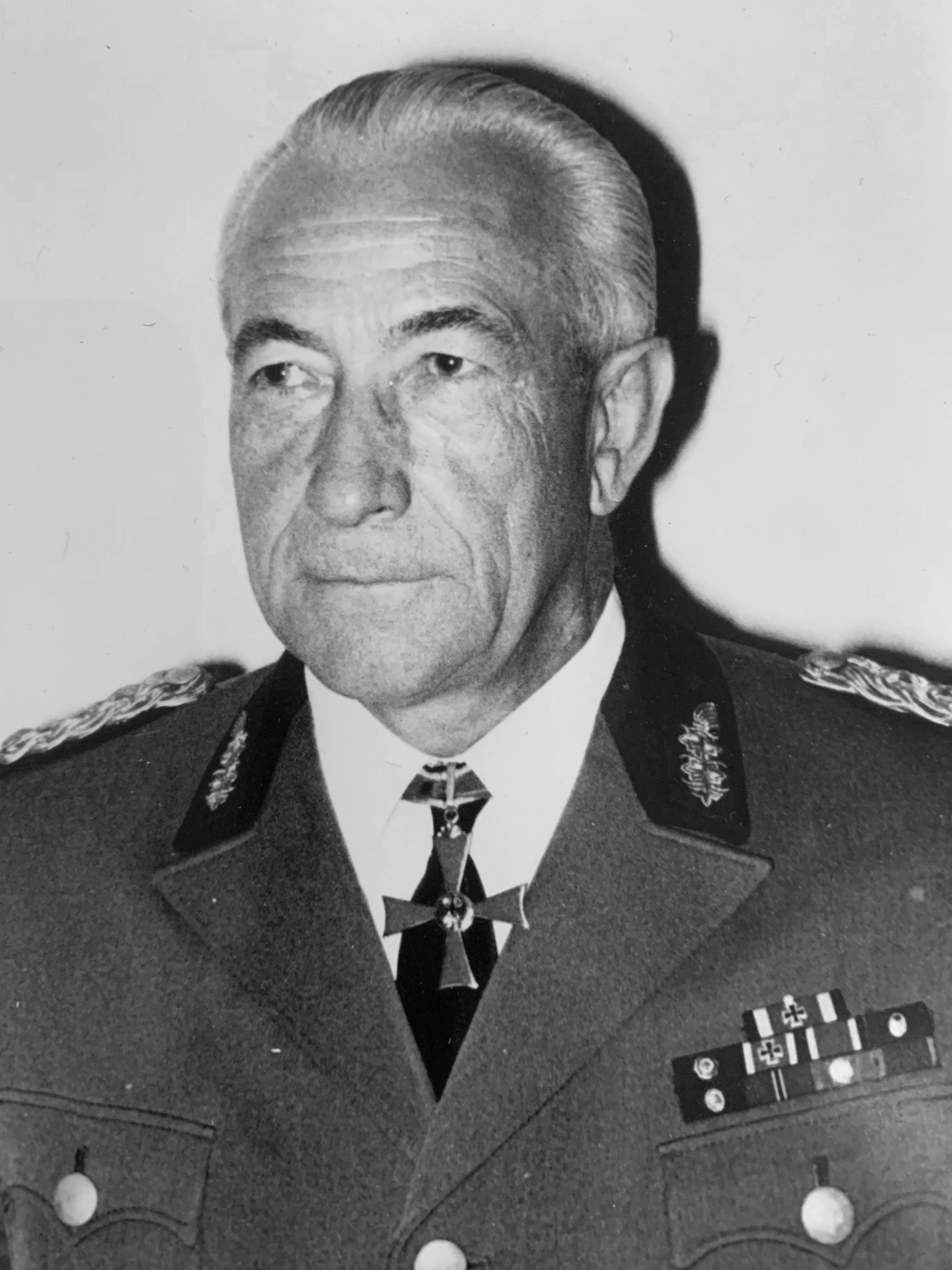
- Born: 2 June 1907; Schuchten
- Died: 27 October 1969 (aged 62); Bad Bramstedt
- Military career
- Allegiance: Weimar Republic (to 1933); Nazi Germany (to 1945); West Germany
- Branch: Heer; Bundesgrenzschutz
- Service years: 1924–45; 1951–67
- Rank: Generalmajor (Wehrmacht); Brigadegeneral (Bundesgrenzschutz)
- Commands: Panzer Division "Kurmark"
- Conflicts: World War II: Invasion of Poland; Battle of France; Invasion of Yugoslavia; Operation Barbarossa; Battle of Brody (1941); Battle of Kiev (1941); Battle of Rostov (1941); Second Battle of Kharkov; Battle of Stalingrad; Battle of Kursk; Battle of Smolensk (1943); Lower Dnieper Offensive; First Jassy-Kishinev Offensive; Battle of the Seelow Heights; Battle of Halbe
- Awards: Knight's Cross of the Iron Cross with Oak Leaves

Willy Langkeit (2 June 1907 – 27 October 1969) was an Generalmajor in the Wehrmacht during World War II, and one of 882 recipients of the Knight's Cross of the Iron Cross with Oak Leaves. Willy Langkeit was taken prisoner by American troops in May 1945 and transferred to British custody later that month. He was held until 1947 and later joined the Bundesgrenzschutz (Federal Border Guards) in 1951, retiring in 1967.

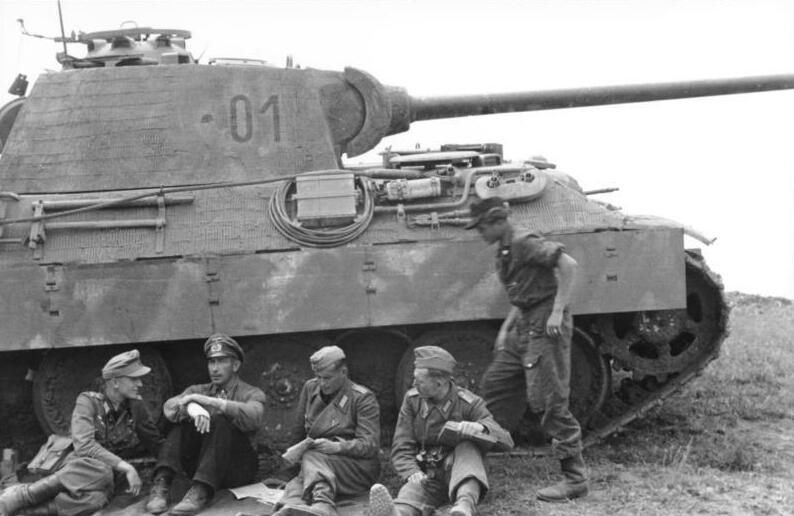
Willy Langkeit, 2nd from left

== Awards and decorations ==
- Iron Cross (1939)
  - 2nd Class (10 November 1939)
  - 1st Class (30 August 1940)
- German Cross in Gold on 1 July 1942 as Major in the II./Panzer-Regiment 36
- Knight's Cross of the Iron Cross with Oak Leaves
  - Knight's Cross on 9 December 1942 as Major and commander of I./Panzer-Regiment 36
  - 348th Oak Leaves on 7 December 1943 as Oberstleutnant and commander of Panzer-Regiment 36
- Order of Merit of the Federal Republic of Germany

Military offices
Preceded by Formed from Grossdeutschland Panzer Grenadier Ersatz Brigade	Commander of Panzer Division Kurmark; 31 January 1945 – 5 May 1945	Succeeded by None
