= 303rd Division =

303rd Division may refer to:

- 303rd Infantry Division (Wehrmacht), Germany
- 303rd Division (Imperial Japanese Army)
- 303rd Rifle Division, Soviet Union

== See also ==
- List of military divisions by number
