= Gerhard Engel =

German general (1906–1976)

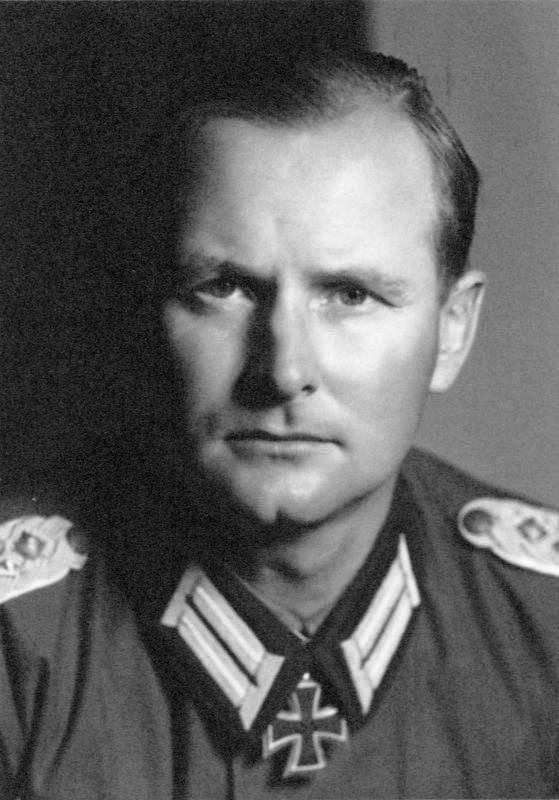
- Born: 13 April 1906; Guben
- Died: 9 December 1976 (aged 70); Munich
- Military career
- Allegiance: Weimar Republic; Nazi Germany
- Branch: German Army
- Service years: 1925–1945
- Rank: Generalleutnant
- Commands: 12th Infantry Division; 56th Infantry Division; Division Ulrich von Hutten
- Conflicts: World War II
- Awards: Knight's Cross of the Iron Cross with Oak Leaves

Gerhard Engel (13 April 1906 – 9 December 1976) was a German general during World War II who commanded several divisions after serving as an adjutant to Adolf Hitler. He was a recipient of the Knight's Cross of the Iron Cross with Oak Leaves.

== Military career ==
Gerhard Engel joined the army in 1925, and served in the armed forces of the Weimar Republic and then of Nazi Germany. In 1938, he was appointed adjutant to the Commander-in-Chief of the Army. In 1941, he was promoted to major, and appointed an army adjutant to Hitler. He wrote a secret diary which was published after the war as "At the Heart of the Reich". In 1943, Engel was transferred to the Western Front. He fought in the Battle of Aachen, the Battle of Hürtgen Forest, the Battle of the Bulge, and the Battle of Halbe.

From 13 April 1945 until the end of World War II, Engel commanded the Infantry Division Ulrich von Hutten. He was taken prisoner by the U.S. Army in May 1945, and released in December 1947. After his release, Engel was manager of a sugar factory in Nörvenich, and then of a machine factory in Düsseldorf. From April 1958 to December 1976, he worked as State Commissioner of the Society for Military Customer in North Rhine-Westphalia. Engel died in 1976.

== Awards and decorations ==
- Iron Cross (1939) 2nd Class (26 February 1944) & 1st Class (23 May 1944)
- German Cross in Silver on 16 October 1943 as Oberstleutnant in Füsilier-Regiment 27
- Knight's Cross of the Iron Cross with Oak Leaves
  - Knight's Cross on 4 July 1944 as Oberstleutnant and commander of Füsilier-Regiment 27
  - Oak Leaves on 11 December 1944 as Generalmajor and commander of 12. Volksgrenadier-Division

Military offices
Preceded by Generalleutnant Rudolf Bamler	Commander of 12. Infanterie-Division; 28 June 1944 – October 1944	Succeeded by Renamed 12. Volksgrenadier-Division
Preceded by Previously 12. Infanterie-Division	Commander of 12. Volksgrenadier-Division; October 1944 – November 1944	Succeeded by Generalmajor Günther Rohr
Preceded by Generalmajor Günther Rohr	Commander of 12. Volksgrenadier-Division; November 1944 – 1 January 1945	Succeeded by Oberst Langhäuser
Preceded by Oberst Langhäuser	Commander of 12. Volksgrenadier-Division; 27 March 1945 – 12 April 1945	Succeeded by None
Preceded by Generalleutnant Edmund Blaurock	Commander of Infanterie Division "Ulrich von Hutten"; 13 April 1945 – May 1945	Succeeded by None
