= Friedrich Sixt =

German general

- Born: 28 October 1895; Munich, German Empire
- Died: 4 August 1976 (aged 80); Munich, West Germany
- Military career
- Allegiance: Nazi Germany
- Branch: German Army
- Service years: 1914–1945
- Rank: Generalleutnant
- Commands: 50th Infantry Division; 5. Jäger-Division; CI Army Corps
- Conflicts: World War II
- Awards: Knight's Cross of the Iron Cross with Oak Leaves

Friedrich Sixt (28 October 1895 – 4 August 1976) was a German general during World War II who commanded several divisions. He was a recipient of the Knight's Cross of the Iron Cross with Oak Leaves of Nazi Germany.

He commanded the 50th Infantry Division during the 1944 Crimean Offensive and was wounded during heavy attacks by the 2nd Guards Army south of the Belbek river on 1 May 1944. Sixt was subsequently evacuated, leaving Colonel Paul Betz in command of the 50th Infantry Division.

== Awards and decorations ==
- Iron Cross (1914)
  - 2nd Class (23 December 1915)
  - 1st Class (5 May 1918)
- Clasp to the Iron Cross (1939)
  - 2nd Class (28 September 1939)
  - 1st Class (11 June 1941)
- German Cross in Gold on 18 May 1942 as Oberst im Generalstab in the General Staff of the XXXXIV Armeekorps
- Knight's Cross of the Iron Cross with Oak Leaves
  - Knight's Cross on 17 December 1943 as Generalleutnant and commander of 50. Infanterie-Division
  - 772nd Oak Leaves on 11 March 1945 as Generalleutnant and commander of 5. Jäger-Division

Military offices
| Preceded by Generalleutnant Friedrich Schmidt | Commander of 50. Infanterie-Division; 26 June 1943 – 30 April 1944 | Succeeded by Generalleutnant Paul Betz |
| Preceded by Generalmajor Helmut Thumm | Commander of 5. Jäger Division; 1 November 1944 – 19 April 1945 | Succeeded by Generalleutnant Edmund Blaurock |
| Preceded by General der Artillerie Wilhelm Berlin | Commander of CI. Armeekorps; 19 April – 8 May 1945 | Succeeded by None |
