= Czukty =

- Village
- Location within Poland
- Coordinates: 54°7′N 22°21′E
- Country: Poland
- Voivodeship: Warmian-Masurian
- County: Olecko
- Gmina: Kowale Oleckie
- Founded: 1560
- Founder: Mikołaj Czukta
- Time zone: UTC+1 (CET)
  - Summer (DST): UTC+2 (CEST)
- Vehicle registration: NOE

Czukty [ˈt͡ʂuktɨ] is a village in the administrative district of Gmina Kowale Oleckie, within Olecko County, Warmian-Masurian Voivodeship, in north-eastern Poland. It is part of the region of Masuria.

== History ==
Czukty was founded in 1560 by Mikołaj Czukta, who bought land to establish a village. It was named after the founder. As of 1600, the population of the village was solely Polish. In 1939, it had a population of 190.

== Notable residents ==
- Willy Langkeit (1907–1969), Wehrmacht general
