= Ruediger Pipkorn =

SS officer

Rüdiger Pipkorn
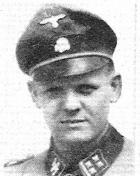
- Born: 19 November 1909
- Died: 25 April 1945 (aged 35); Halbe, Germany
- Military career
- Allegiance: Nazi Germany
- Branch: Waffen-SS
- Service years: 1939–45
- Rank: Oberst and Standartenführer
- Unit: 35th SS-Police Grenadier Division
- Conflicts: World War II

Rüdiger Pipkorn (19 November 1909 – 25 April 1945) was an Oberst (Colonel), and a temporary Standartenführer (Colonel) in the Waffen-SS during World War II. He was killed in action in 1945, while in command of the 35th SS Police Grenadier Division.

In the spring of 1945, he was given command of the 35th SS Police Grenadier Division, which by April was in positions on the Neisse River near Guben, southeast of Berlin. The Soviet Berlin offensive had started on 16 April. He was killed on 25 April 1945 while attempting to break out of the Halbe pocket.
