= 35th SS-Police Grenadier Division =

German infantry division

35th SS- und Polizei Grenadier Division
- 35. SS- und Polizei-Grenadier-Division
- Division emblem
- Active: 1 March – 8 May 1945
- Country: Nazi Germany
- Branch: Waffen-SS
- Type: Infantry
- Size: Division
- Engagements: World War II; Battle of the Seelow Heights; Battle of Halbe

Commanders
- Oberfuhrer: Johannes Wirth
- Standartenführer: Ruediger Pipkorn

The 35th SS- und Police Grenadier Division (German: 35. SS- und Polizei-Grenadier-Division) (Note: Some sources render the unit's name as 35. SS-Polizei-Grenadier-Division.) was an infantry division of the Waffen-SS of Nazi Germany during World War II. It was created from SS-Police units transferred to the Waffen-SS. It was formed in the spring of 1945, and its actual strength is not known. As part of the German Ninth Army, it was badly mauled on the approaches to Berlin during the Battle of the Seelow Heights, and was destroyed during the Battle of Halbe. Various remnants surrendered to American and Soviet forces near the demarcation line of the Elbe.

== Organisation ==
English designation
- SS-Police Grenadier Regiment 89 (I, II and III battalion)
- SS-Police Grenadier Regiment 90 (I – II)
- SS-Police Grenadier Regiment 91 (I – II)
- SS-Police Artillery Regiment 35 (I – III)
  - SS-Police Fusilier Battalion 35
  - SS-Panzer Antitank Battalion 35
  - SS-Panzer Engineer Battalion 35
  - SS-Panzer Communications Battalion 35
- SS-Supply Regiment 35

- SS-Military Police Patrol 35

German designation
- SS-Polizei-Grenadier-Regiment 89 (I – III)
- SS-Polizei-Grenadier-Regiment 90 (I – II)
- SS-Polizei-Grenadier-Regiment 91 (I – II)
- SS-Polizei-Artillerie-Regiment 35 (I – III)
  - SS-Polizei-Füsilier-Abteilung 35
  - SS-Panzerjäger-Abteilung 35
  - SS-Polizei-Pionier-Bataillon 35
  - SS-Polizei-Nachrichten-Abteilung 35
- SS-Versorgungs-Regiment 35

- SS-Feldgendarmerie-Trupp 35

== Commanders ==
- SS-Oberfuhrer Johannes Wirth (February–March 1945)
- SS-Standartenführer Ruediger Pipkorn (March–May 1945)

== See also ==
- List of German divisions in World War II
- List of Waffen-SS divisions
- List of SS personnel
