= 606th Infantry Division =

- German: 606. Infanterie-Division
- Active: 7 November 1944 – May 1945
- Country: Nazi Germany
- Branch: Heer (Wehrmacht)
- Type: Infantry
- Size: Division
- Nickname: Division z.b.V. 606

The 606th Infantry Division (German: 606. Infanterie-Division), also known as the Division for special deployment 606 (German: Division z.b.V. 606) was a short-lived infantry division of the Heer, the ground forces of Nazi Germany's Wehrmacht. It was active in April 1945.

== History ==
The 606th Division was initially founded on 7 November 1944 as the "Division for special purposes 606" (German: Division z.b.V. 606) in the German-occupied Netherlands using elements of the former 344th Infantry Division. During its service in the Netherlands, the 606th Division was placed subordinate to the LXXXVI Corps of 1st Parachute Army between November and December 1944, and subsequently under II Parachute Corps in January 1945. In February 1945, the division was deployed to the Oder river on the Eastern Front, as part of CI Army Corps of 9th Army, leaving behind some elements that were integrated into the 180th Infantry Division. The 606th Division saw combat at Küstrin, where it also took control of various disparate German forces that had been swept up in the chaos of the final months of the war, such as the Panzer Replacement and Training Detachment 3, the Emergency Battalions Potsdam, Spandau and Brandenburg and the Police Battalion Bremen.

On 11 April 1945, less than a month from the end of the war, the division was officially redesignated "606th Infantry Division" (German: 606. Infanterie-Division); it was intended to use elements of the 541st Volksgrenadier Division to replenish the division, though it is not entirely clear how far this increase in forces was completed before the end of the war with Germany's surrender on 8/9 May 1945. The designation of the 606th Division as an infantry division was not universally replicated in all German sources.
