= 50th Infantry Division (Wehrmacht) =

- 50. Infanterie-Division
- Insignia of the 50th Infantry Division
- Active: 26 August 1939 – May 1945
- Country: Nazi Germany
- Branch: Army
- Type: Infantry
- Size: Division
- Nicknames: Arrow and Bow Division
- Engagements: World War II: Invasion of Poland; Battle of France; Battle of Greece; Operation Barbarossa; Siege of Sevastopol (1941-1942); Battle of the Caucasus; Crimean Offensive; East Prussian Offensive; Heiligenbeil Pocket

Commanders
- Notable commanders: Karl-Adolf Hollidt

The 50th Infantry Division (German: 50. Infanterie-Division) was a German army division in World War II. It was formed on 26 August 1939 from the Grenzkommandantur Küstrin.

It was initially a 2nd wave division but it was later reorganized as a 1st wave division on 15 November 1939.

The Division fought many campaigns including the invasion of Poland, Fall Gelb and the invasion of Greece. It later took part in Operation Barbarossa, fighting on the southern sector under the 11th Army. In November 1942, it crossed the Kerch Strait from Crimea to reinforce retreating elements of the 17th Army after the German forces failed in their Caucasus Offensive. It was later destroyed in the Heiligenbeil pocket.

== Order of battle ==
=== 1939 ===
- Infantry Regiment 121
- Infantry Regiment 122
- Infantry Regiment 123
- Artillery Regiment 150 (2)
- Engineer Battalion 71
- Anti-Tank Detachment 150
- Signal Detachment 71
- Supply Units 354 (3)

=== 1940 ===
- Infantry Regiment 121
- Infantry Regiment 122
- Infantry Regiment 123
- Artillery Regiment 150
- Engineer Battalion 71
- Anti-Tank Detachment 150
- Cycling Squadron 150
- Signal Detachment 71
- Supply Leader 150

=== 1944 ===
- Grenadier Regiment 121
- Grenadier Regiment 122
- Grenadier Regiment 123
- Fusilier Battalion 50
- Artillery Regiment 150
- Panzerjäger Detachment 150
- Field Replacement Battalion 150
- Supply Regiment 150
- Signal Detachment 150

== Commanding officers ==
- Generalleutnant Konrad Sorsche (1 September 1939 – 25 October 1940)
- Generaloberst Karl-Adolf Hollidt (25 October 1940 – 23 January 1942)
- Generalleutnant August Schmidt (31 January 1942 – 1 March 1942)
- Generalleutnant Friedrich Schmidt (1 Mar 1942 – 26 June 1943)
- Generalleutnant Friedrich Sixt (26 June 1943 – 30 April 1944)
- Generalleutnant Paul Betz (30 Apr 1944 – 9 May 1944)
- Generalmajor Georg Haus (5 June 1944 – 18 April 1945)
- Generalmajor Kurt Domansky (18 April 1945 – 28 April 1945)
- Oberst Ribbert (28 April 1945 – ? May 1945)
