= Edmund Blaurock =

German general (1899–1966)

- Born: 12 October 1899; Nuremberg, Bavaria, German Empire
- Died: 25 January 1966 (aged 66); Nuremberg, Bavaria, West Germany
- Military career
- Allegiance: Nazi Germany
- Branch: Army
- Service years: 1917–1945
- Rank: Generalleutnant
- Commands: 56th Infantry Division; 5th Jäger Division
- Conflicts: World War II
- Awards: Knight's Cross of the Iron Cross with Oak Leaves

Edmund Blaurock (12 October 1899 – 25 January 1966) was a general in the army of Nazi Germany during World War II who commanded several divisions. He was a recipient of the Knight's Cross of the Iron Cross with Oak Leaves.

Between 29 March and 13 April 1945, Blaurock commanded the Infantry Division Ulrich von Hutten.

== Awards and decorations ==
- Iron Cross (1914) 2nd Class (26 August 1918)
- Clasp to the Iron Cross (1939) 2nd Class (24 September 1939) & 1st Class (24 October 1939)
- German Cross in Gold on 4 June 1944 as Oberst im Generalstab (in the General Staff) and commander of Grenadier-Regiment 320
- Knight's Cross of the Iron Cross with Oak Leaves
  - Knight's Cross on 27 July 1944 as Oberst im Generalstab and commander of Grenadier-Regiment 320
  - 746th Oak Leaves on 19 February 1945 as Generalmajor and commander of 56. Infanterie-Division

Military offices
| Preceded by Generalleutnant Vincenz Müller | Commander of 56. Infanterie-Division; September 1944 – 29 March 1945 | Succeeded by None |
| Preceded by Formed from remnants of 56. Infanterie-Division | Commander of Infanterie Division Ulrich von Hutten; 29 March 1945 – 13 April 1945 | Succeeded by Generalleutnant Gerhard Engel |
| Preceded by Generalleutnant Friedrich Sixt | Commander of 5. Jäger Division; 19 April 1945 – 3 May 1945 | Succeeded by None |
