= V SS Mountain Corps =

- Active: October 1943 – May 1945
- Country: Germany
- Branch: Waffen-SS
- Type: Gebirgsjäger
- Role: Mountain warfare
- Size: Corps
- Engagements: Operation Rösselsprung; Battle of Halbe; Defense of Schwedt Bridgehead; Battle of Berlin

The V SS Mountain Corps was a Waffen-SS formation that existed in the later periods of World War II. The corps fought against the Yugoslav Partisans in the Balkans as part of the 2nd Panzer Army from October 1943 to December 1944. At this time it rarely had more than two understrength divisions. In 1945, the corps fought on the Oder line as part of the 9th Army, in the Frankfurt (Oder) area, and in the Battle of Berlin that followed.

The corps' war diary was destroyed (with only fragments of copies surviving), likely near the war's end, causing the loss of valuable information on the Yugoslav campaign.

== Commanders ==
- SS-Obergruppenführer und General der Waffen-SS Artur Phleps (1 July 1943 – 21 September 1944)
- SS-Brigadeführer und Generalmajor der Waffen-SS Karl von Oberkamp (21 September – 1 October 1944)
- SS-Obergruppenführer und General der Waffen-SS Friedrich-Wilhelm Krüger (1 October 1944 – 1 March 1945)
- SS-Obergruppenführer und General der Waffen-SS Friedrich Jeckeln (1 March – 8 May 1945)

Walter Harzer served as chief of staff.

== Subordinate units ==
- 32nd SS Volunteer Grenadier Division "30 Januar"
- 35th SS-Police Grenadier Division
- 36th Waffen Grenadier Division of the SS
- 502nd Heavy Panzer Battalion

== Bibliography ==
- Beevor, Antony. Berlin: The Downfall 1945, Penguin Books, 2002, ISBN 0-670-88695-5.
- Ripley, Tim. The Waffen SS at War, Zenith Imprint, 2004, ISBN 0-7603-2068-3.
