= Ernst Biehler =

German general in the Wehrmacht

Ernst Friedrich Biehler
- Born: 7 June 1903
- Died: 26 May 1997 (aged 93)
- Military career
- Allegiance: Weimar Republic; Nazi Germany
- Branch: Army
- Service years: 1923–45
- Rank: Generalmajor
- Commands: 205. Infanterie-Division; Fortress commander of Frankfurt/Oder
- Conflicts: World War II
- Awards: Knight's Cross of the Iron Cross

Ernst Friedrich Biehler (7 June 1903 – 26 May 1997) was a German general in the Wehrmacht during World War II. He was also a recipient of the Knight's Cross of the Iron Cross.

== Awards and decorations ==
- Wehrmacht Long Service Award 3rd Class (2 October 1936)
  - 2nd Class (2 August 1940)
  - 1st Class (20 April 1942)
- German Cross in Gold on 10 July 1943 as Oberstleutnant im Generalstab in the 24. Infanterie-Division
- Knight's Cross of the Iron Cross on 9 May 1945 as Generalmajor and Fortress commander of Frankfurt/Oder (Note: Ernst Biehler's nomination by the troop, without the mandatory explanatory statement, was received by the Heerespersonalamt (HPA—Army Staff Office) on 20 April 1945 as a teleprinter messenger. On 21 April 1945 the nomination arrived at the time relocating 1. Squadron of the HPA. The teleprinter message indicated that the explanatory statement would follow later. This statement was either never sent, may have gotten stuck or lost, at least it does not exist anymore. Biehler was also not listed in the Knight's Cross nomination book nor was a file card created. A presentation cannot be verified in the German Federal Archives. According to the Association of Knight's Cross Recipients (AKCR) the award was presented in accordance with the Dönitz-decree. This is illegal according to the Deutsche Dienststelle (WASt) and lacks legal justification. The presentation date was assigned by Walther-Peer Fellgiebel. Biehler was a member of the AKCR.)
