= Order of battle of the German Ninth Army, October 1941 =

Order of battle of the German Ninth Army, October 1941 represents the order of battle for the German Ninth Army during Operation Typhoon as part of the German Army Group Center as it attempted to capture Moscow during World War II.

== Command ==
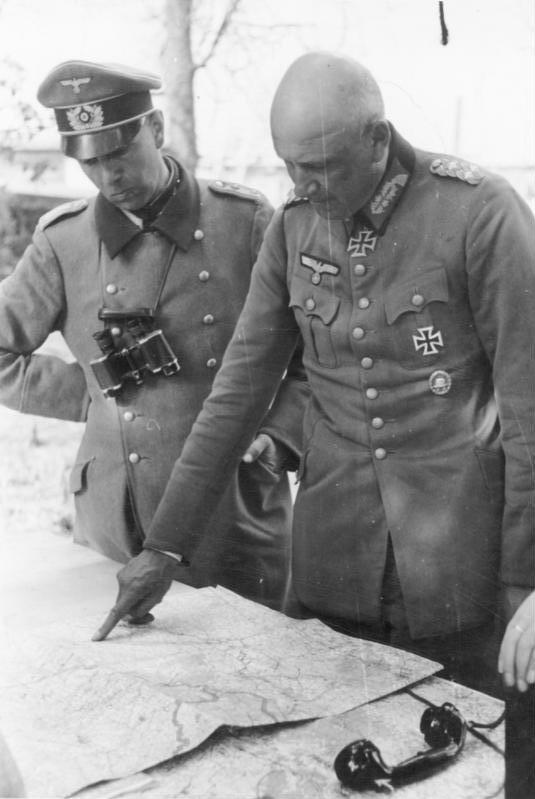
Adolf Strauß (right)

Commander: Colonel General Adolf Strauß
Chief of Staff: Colonel Kurt Weckmann
Army reserves

161. Infanterie-Division
Major General Heinrich Recke

Headquarters
336th Infantry Regiment
364th Infantry Regiment
371st Infantry Regiment
241st Artillery Regiment
241st Reconnaissance Company
241st Tank Destroyer Battalion
241st Engineer Battalion
241st Signal Battalion
241st Field Replacement Battalion
241st Divisional Supply Group

== V Corps ==
General of Infantry Richard Ruoff

5. Infanterie-Division
Maj. Gen. Karl Allmendinger

Headquarters
14th Infantry Regiment
56th Infantry Regiment
75th Infantry Regiment
5th Motorized Artillery Regiment
5th Bicycle Battalion
5th Tank Destroyer Battalion
5th Motorized Engineer Battalion
5th Motorized Signal Battalion
5th Field Replacement Battalion
5th Divisional Supply Group

35. Infanterie-Division
Lt. Gen. Walther Fischer von Weikersthal

Headquarters
34th Infantry Regiment
109th Infantry Regiment
111th Infantry Regiment
35th Artillery Regiment
35th Reconnaissance Battalion
35th Anti-Tank Battalion
35th Engineer Battalion
35th Signal Battalion
35th Field Replacement Battalion
35th Divisional Supply Group

106. Infanterie-Division
Maj. Gen. Ernst Dehner

Headquarters
239th Infantry Regiment
240th Infantry Regiment
241st Infantry Regiment
106th Artillery Regiment
106th Reconnaissance Battalion
106th Tank Destroyer Battalion
106th Engineer Battalion
106th Signal Battalion
106th Divisional Supply Group

129.Infanterie-Division
Maj. Gen. Stephan Rittau

Headquarters
427th Infantry Regiment
428th Infantry Regiment
430th Infantry Regiment
129th Artillery Regiment
129th Reconnaissance Battalion
129th Tank Destroyer Battalion
129th Engineer Battalion
129th Signal Battalion
129th Divisional Supply Group

== VII Corps ==
General of Artillery Wilhelm Fahrmbacher

8. Infanterie-Division
Maj. Gen. Gustav Höhne

Headquarters
38th Jäger Regiment
84th Jäger Regiment
8th Artillery Regiment
8th Bicycle Battalion
8th Tank Destroyer Battalion
8th Engineer Battalion
8th Signal Battalion
85th Field Replacement Battalion
8th Divisional Supply Group

28. Infanterie-Division
Lt. Gen. Johann Sinnhuber

Headquarters
49th Jäger Regiment
83rd Jäger Regiment
28th Artillery Regiment
28th Bicycle Battalion
28th Anti-Tank Battalion
28th Engineer Battalion
28th Signal Battalion
28th Divisional Supply Group

87. Infanterie-Division
Lt. Gen. Bogislav von Studnitz

Headquarters
173rd Infantry Regiment
185th Infantry Regiment
187th Infantry Regiment
187th Artillery Regiment
187th Reconnaissance Battalion
187th Anti-Tank Battalion
187th Engineer Battalion
187th Signal Battalion
187th Supply Group

== XXIII Corps ==
General of Infantry Albrecht Schubert

102. Infanterie-Division
Maj. Gen. John Ansat

232nd Infantry Regiment
233rd Infantry Regiment
235th Infantry Regiment
104th Artillery Regiment
102nd Reconnaissance Battalion
102nd Tank Destroyer Battalion
102nd Engineer Battalion
102nd Signal Battalion
102nd Divisional Supply Group

206. Infanterie-Division
Lt. Gen. Hugo Höfl

301st Infantry Regiment
312th Infantry Regiment
413th Infantry Regiment
206th Artillery Regiment
206th Reconnaissance Battalion
206th Tank Destroyer Battalion
206th Engineer Battalion
206th Signal Battalion
206th Divisional Supply Group

251. Infanterie-Division
Maj. Gen. Karl Burdach

Headquarters
451st Infantry Regiment
459th Infantry Regiment
471st Infantry Regiment
251st Artillery Regiment
251st Reconnaissance Battalion
251st Tank Destroyer Battalion
251st Engineer Battalion
251st Signal Battalion
251st Divisional Supply Group

256. Infanterie-Division
Maj. Gen. Gerhard Kauffmann

456th Infantry Regiment
476th Infantry Regiment
481st Infantry Regiment
256th Artillery Regiment
256th Reconnaissance Battalion
256th Tank Destroyer Battalion
256th Engineer Battalion
256th Signal Battalion
256th Divisional Supply Group

== XXVII Corps ==
General of Infantry Alfred Wäger

86. Infanterie-Division
Lt. Gen. Joachim Witthöft

167th Infantry Regiment
184th Infantry Regiment
216th Infantry Regiment
186th Artillery Regiment
186th Reconnaissance Battalion
186th Anti-Tank Battalion
186th Engineer Battalion
186th Signal Battalion
186th Divisional Supply Group

162. Infanterie-Division
Lt. Gen. Hermann Franke

303rd Infantry Regiment
314th Infantry Regiment
329th Infantry Regiment
236th Artillery Regiment
236th Reconnaissance Battalion
236th Tank Destroyer Battalion
236th Engineer Battalion
236th Signal Battalion
236th Divisional Supply Group

255. Infanterie-Division
Lt. Gen. Wilhelm Wetzel

Headquarters
455th Infantry Regiment
465th Infantry Regiment
475th Infantry Regiment
255th Artillery Regiment
255th Reconnaissance Battalion
255th Anti-Tank Battalion
255th Engineer Battalion
255th Signal Battalion
255th Field Replacement Battalion
255th Divisional Supply Group
