= 5th Jäger Division =

German infantry division of WW2

5th Infantry Division 5th Jäger Division
- German: 5. Infanterie-Division; 5. Jäger-Division
- Unit insignia
- Active: October 1934 – 8 May 1945
- Country: Nazi Germany
- Branch: German Army
- Type: Light infantry
- Size: Division
- Garrison/HQ: Freiburg

The German 5th Infantry Division (German: 5. Infanterie-Division) was formed in October 1934 and mobilized on 25 August 1939. The division's troops were garrisoned in Konstanz, Ulm, and Freiburg. When formed, the division consisted of the 1st, 2nd, and 3rd Battalions of the 14th, 56th, and 75th Infantry Regiments, the 1st, 2nd, and 3rd Battalions of the 5th Artillery Regiment, the 1st Battalion of the 41st Artillery Regiment, and assorted 5th Division support units.

The division sat out the Invasion of Poland on the western front and first saw battle with the Second Army during the Campaign for France in 1940. Thereafter, the division was engaged in occupation duties in France until March 1941.

In April 1941, the division was sent to East Prussia and then took part in the invasion of the Soviet Union in June 1941, fighting in the vicinity of Vyazma until the end of the year, when the division was pulled back to France for a two-month refit.

In 1942, the division returned to the Eastern Front, took part in the fighting around Demyansk in March and April 1942 and fought in the area of Staraja Russa until the close of 1943.

In July 1942, the division was reorganized as a Jäger division and renamed the 5. Jäger-Division.

The division retreated through the areas of Vitebsk, Kovel, and Narev during 1944. In early 1945, the division fought in the vicinities of Neustettin and Dramburg, with its last battles fought around Freienwalde near the Oder River during the Battle of Berlin in April 1945. The division surrendered to the Red Army at Wittenberge.

== Background ==
The main purpose of the German Jäger Divisions was to fight in adverse terrain where smaller, coordinated units were more facilely combat capable than the brute force offered by the standard infantry divisions. The Jäger divisions were more heavily equipped than mountain divisions, but not as well armed as a larger infantry division. In the early stages of the war, they were the interface divisions fighting in rough terrain and foothills as well as urban areas, between the mountains and the plains. The Jägers (means hunters in German) relied on a high degree of training, and slightly superior communications, as well as their not inconsiderable artillery support. In the middle stages of the war, as the standard infantry divisions were downsized, the Jäger structure of divisions with two infantry regiments became the standard table of organization.

In 1943, Adolf Hitler declared that all infantry divisions were now Grenadier Divisions except for his elite Jäger and Mountain Jäger divisions.

== Commanding officers ==
- Generalmajor Eugen Hahn, 1 October 1934 – 10 August 1938
- Generalleutnant Wilhelm Fahrmbacher, August 1938 – 25 October 1940
- Generalmajor Karl Allmendinger, 25 October 1940 – renamed to 5. leichte Infanterie-Division
- General der Infanterie Karl Allmendinger, November 1940 – June 1942
- Oberst Walter Jost, June 1942 – redesignated to 5. Jäger-Division
- General der Infanterie Karl Allmendinger, July 1942 – 4 January 1943
- General der Infanterie Helmut Thumm, 4 January 1943 – 1 March 1944
- Generalmajor Johannes Gittner, 1 March 1944 – 30 June 1944
- General der Infanterie Helmut Thumm, 30 June 1944 – 1 November 1944
- Generalleutnant Friedrich Sixt, 1 November 1944 – 19 April 1945
- Generalleutnant Edmund Blaurock, 19 April 1945 – April 1945

== See also ==
- Order of battle of the German Ninth Army, October 1941

== Article Sources ==
- Hitler's Legions, Samuel W. Mitcham, Jr., Briarcliff Manor: Stein and Day, 1985.
- Burkhard Müller-Hillebrand: Das Heer 1933–1945. Entwicklung des organisatorischen Aufbaues. Vol. III: Der Zweifrontenkrieg. Das Heer vom Beginn des Feldzuges gegen die Sowjetunion bis zum Kriegsende. Mittler: Frankfurt am Main 1969, p. 285.
- Georg Tessin: Verbände und Truppen der deutschen Wehrmacht und Waffen-SS im Zweiten Weltkrieg, 1939–1945. Vol. II: Die Landstreitkräfte 1–5. Mittler: Frankfurt am Main 1966.
