= XI SS Panzer Corps =

XI SS Army Corps
- XI. SS-Armeekorps; XI. SS-Panzerkorps
- Active: July 24, 1944 – March 1945
- Country: Nazi Germany
- Branch: Waffen-SS

Commanders
- Notable commanders: Matthias Kleinheisterkamp

The XI SS Corps (German: XI. SS-Armeekorps later XI. SS-Panzerkorps) was a Waffen-SS corps created on July 24, 1944 in southern Poland on the basis of the remains of the headquarters of the defeated V Army Corps and employed on the Eastern Front in 1944-1945 during World War II.

There were no SS units in the corps, as the SS prefix in the name is explained only by the fact that the commander, Matthias Kleinheisterkamp, was not a general of the Wehrmacht, but an SS-Obergruppenführer. On February 1, 1945 the corps was transformed into the XI SS Panzer Corps.

== History ==
The corps was formed in August 1944 in Western Galicia as part of the 17th Army, which was subordinate to Army Group North Ukraine (in October renamed Army Group A). It defended the front between Tarnów and Pilzno until it had to withdraw to the Western Carpathians during the Vistula–Oder offensive in January 1945.

It became part of the 9th Army tasked with holding a defensive line on the Oder River. On February 1, 1945 the corps was upgraded to the XI SS Panzer Corps, and was ordered to destroy the Soviet bridgehead near Küstrin and relieve the fortress, but failed. The corps then fought in the Battle of the Seelow Heights and the Battle of Halbe in late April 1945 and was defeated by Soviet troops. Kleinheisterkamp was among those captured and committed suicide shortly after.

== Orders of battle ==
September 1944

- 78th Assault Division
- 544th Grenadier Division
- 545th Grenadier Division

March 1945

- 25th Panzergrenadier Division
- 712th Infantry Division
- Panzergrenadier Division Kurmark
- Küstrin Fortress

== Sources ==
- This is a translation of an article in the Dutch Wikipedia, XI SS Korps.
