= Battle of Halbe =

Battle in the Eastern Front of World War 2

- Part of Battle of Berlin, Eastern Front and the End of World War II in Europe
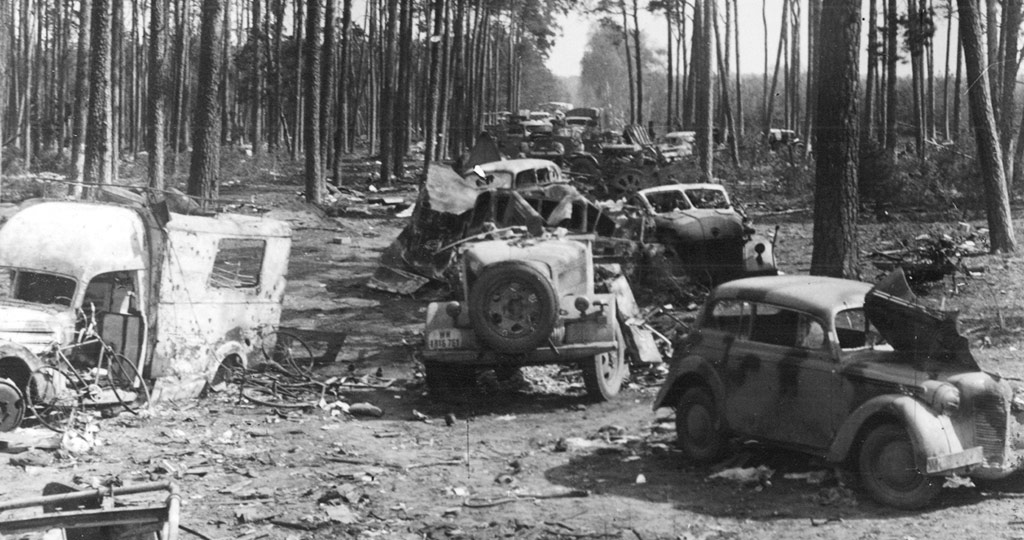
- A destroyed Wehrmacht convoy near Spree Forest, April 1945
Date	April 24 – May 1, 1945
Location	Halbe, Germany 52°6′24″N 13°42′3″E
Result	Soviet victory

Belligerents
(Nazi Germany) Germany	Soviet Union

Commanders and leaders
Theodor Busse; Walther Wenck; Matthias Kleinheisterkamp †	Georgy Zhukov; Ivan Konev

Strength
About 80,000 in the Halbe Pocket; 79 tanks; 150 armored vehicles	280,000

Casualties and losses
30,000 killed; 25,000 escaped; 10,000 civilians killed	40,000 killed or missing
- Location within Germany

The Battle of Halbe (German: Kesselschlacht von Halbe, Battle of the Halbe Pocket; Russian: Хальбский котёл, Halbe pocket) was a battle lasting from April 24 to May 1, 1945, in which the German Ninth Army under the command of General Theodor Busse was destroyed as a fighting force by the advancing Red Army during the Battle of Berlin.

The Ninth Army, encircled in a large pocket in the Spree Forest region south-east of Berlin, attempted to break out westwards through the village of Halbe and the pine forests south of Berlin to link up with the German Twelfth Army commanded by General Walther Wenck with the intention of heading west and surrendering to the Western Allies. To do this, the Ninth Army had to fight its way through three lines of Soviet troops of the 1st Ukrainian Front under the command of Marshal Ivan Konev, while at the same time units of the 1st Belorussian Front, under the command of Marshal Georgy Zhukov, attacked the German rearguard from the northeast.

After heavy fighting, about 30,000 German soldiers—just over one third of those originally in the pocket—reached the comparative safety of the Twelfth Army's front lines. The rest were either killed or captured by Soviet forces.

== Prelude ==
On April 16, the Red Army started the Battle of Berlin with a three Front attack across the Oder-Neisse line. By April 21, it had broken through the German front line in two places and had started to surround Berlin. The German Ninth Army covered the defenses of the Seelow Heights against Marshal Zhukov's 1st Belorussian Front, but its position was unhinged by the successful attack of Marshal Ivan Konev's 1st Ukrainian Front (against Army Group Centre) on the Neisse. By April 20, the Ninth Army retreated south-east of Berlin, opening the way for the 1st Belorussian Front.

Because of the high speed of the advance of Konev's forces, the Ninth Army was now threatened with envelopment by the two Soviet pincers that were heading for Berlin from the south and east. The southern pincer consisted of the 3rd and 4th Guards Tank Armies which had penetrated the furthest and had already cut through the area behind the Ninth Army's front lines.

== Encirclement ==
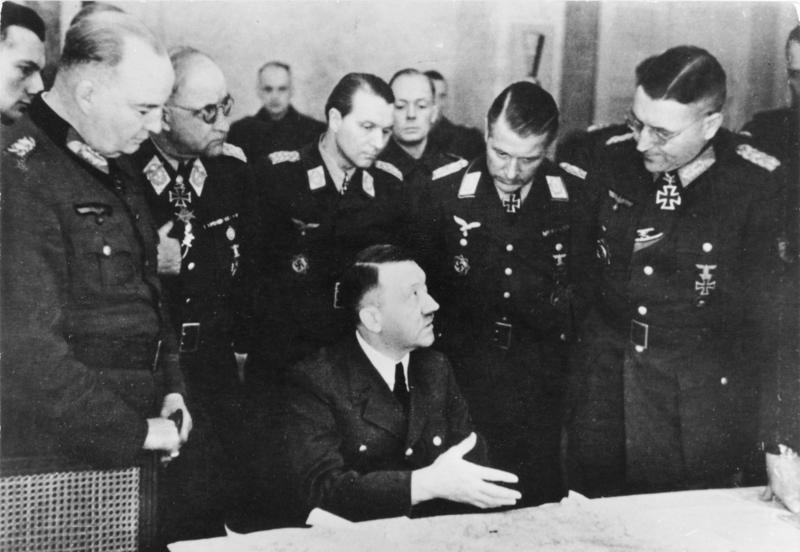
General of the Infantry Theodor Busse (standing, far right) in a meeting with Adolf Hitler, March 1945

=== German dispositions ===
The command of the V SS Mountain Corps, encircled with the Ninth Army north of Forst, passed from the 4th Panzer Army (part of Army Group Centre) to the Ninth Army (part of Army Group Vistula under the command of Colonel-General Gotthard Heinrici). The corps was still holding on to Cottbus. While the bulk of Army Group Centre was being forced, by the advance of the 1st Ukrainian Front, to retreat along its lines of communication to the south-west towards Czechoslovakia, the southern flank of the 4th Panzer Army had some local successes counterattacking north against the 1st Ukrainian Front.

Contrary to realities on the ground, Hitler ordered the Ninth Army to hold Cottbus and set up a front facing west, then they were to attack into the Soviet columns advancing north. This would allow them to form the northern pincer which would meet with the 4th Panzer Army coming from the south and envelop the 1st Ukrainian Front before destroying it. They were to anticipate an attack south by the 3rd Panzer Army and to be ready to be the southern arm of a pincer attack which would envelop the 1st Belorussian Front, which would then be destroyed by SS-general Felix Steiner's III SS Panzer Corps advancing from the north of Berlin. Later in the day, Steiner made it plain that he did not have the divisions to make this effort. Heinrici then explained to Hitler's staff that unless the Ninth Army retreated immediately, it would be enveloped by the Soviet forces. He stressed it was already too late for the unit to move north-west to Berlin and would have to retreat west.

At his afternoon situation conference on April 22, Hitler flew into a rage when he realised that his plans of the day before were not going to be implemented. He declared that the war was lost, blamed the generals and announced that he would stay in Berlin until the end and then kill himself. In an attempt to coax Hitler out of his rage, the Chief of Staff of the OKW, Colonel-General Alfred Jodl, speculated that the 12th Army, which was facing the American forces, could move to Berlin because the Americans already on the Elbe River were unlikely to move further east. Hitler immediately seized upon the idea and within hours, the army's commander, General Walther Wenck, was ordered to disengage from the American forces and move the Twelfth Army north-east to support Berlin. It was then realised that if the Ninth Army moved west, it could link up with the Twelfth Army. In the evening, Heinrici was given permission to make the linkup.

Although in Hitler's mind the Twelfth Army was going to break through to Berlin, and the Ninth Army, once it had broken through to the Twelfth Army, was going to help them, there is no evidence that Generals Heinrici, Busse or Wenck thought that this was at all possible. However, Hitler's agreement to allow the Ninth Army to break through to the Twelfth Army would allow a window through which sizable numbers of German troops could retreat to the west and surrender to the American forces, which is exactly what Wenck and Busse agreed to do. This was made easier when, shortly after midnight on April 25, Busse was given authority "to decide for himself the best direction of attack".

=== The situation of the German 9th Army ===
Before being encircled, the Ninth Army had already suffered heavy losses in the Battle of the Seelow Heights. It is estimated that, at the start of the encirclement, it had fewer than 1,000 guns and mortars, approximately 79 tanks, and probably a total of 150–200 combat-ready armoured fighting vehicles left. In all, there were about 80,000 men in the pocket, the majority of whom belonged to the Ninth Army, consisting of the XI SS Panzer Corps, V SS Mountain Corps and the newly acquired V Army Corps, but there was also the Frankfurt Garrison. The number of tanks reported included 36 tanks in the XI SS Panzer Corps, including up to 14 Tiger II tanks of the 102nd SS Heavy Panzer Battalion. (Note: according to Le Tissier 2005, pp. 145–146 the number of King Tigers in the pocket can not be established with certainty. A strength report from Klein Hammer reports two companies with seven each, but other reports from eyewitnesses indicate a lower number of ten or twelve. What is certain is that 11 King Tigers can be accounted for as lost based on German eyewitness accounts.) Air supply was attempted on April 25 and 26, but could not be carried out because the planes that had taken off could not find the drop point for supply, and no contact with the encircled army could be established.

The pocket into which the Ninth Army had been pushed by troops of the 1st Belorussian and 1st Ukrainian Fronts was a region of lakes and forest in the Spree Forest south-east of Fürstenwalde. The Soviet forces, having broken through and surrounded their primary objective of Berlin, then turned to mopping up those forces in the pocket. On the afternoon of April 25, the Soviet 3rd, 33rd and 69th Armies, as well as the 2nd Guards Cavalry Corps (which was a formation capable of infiltration through difficult terrain such as forests), attacked the pocket from the north-east as ordered by Marshal Georgy Zhukov, the commander of the 1st Belorussian Front. Konev knew that to break out to the west, the Ninth Army would have to cross the Berlin–Dresden Autobahn south of a chain of lakes starting at Teupitz and running north-east. On the same day of his attack in the north-east, Zhukov sent the 3rd Guards Army to support the 28th Army, which was ready to close the likely breakout route over the Berlin–Dresden Autobahn.

=== Soviet dispositions ===
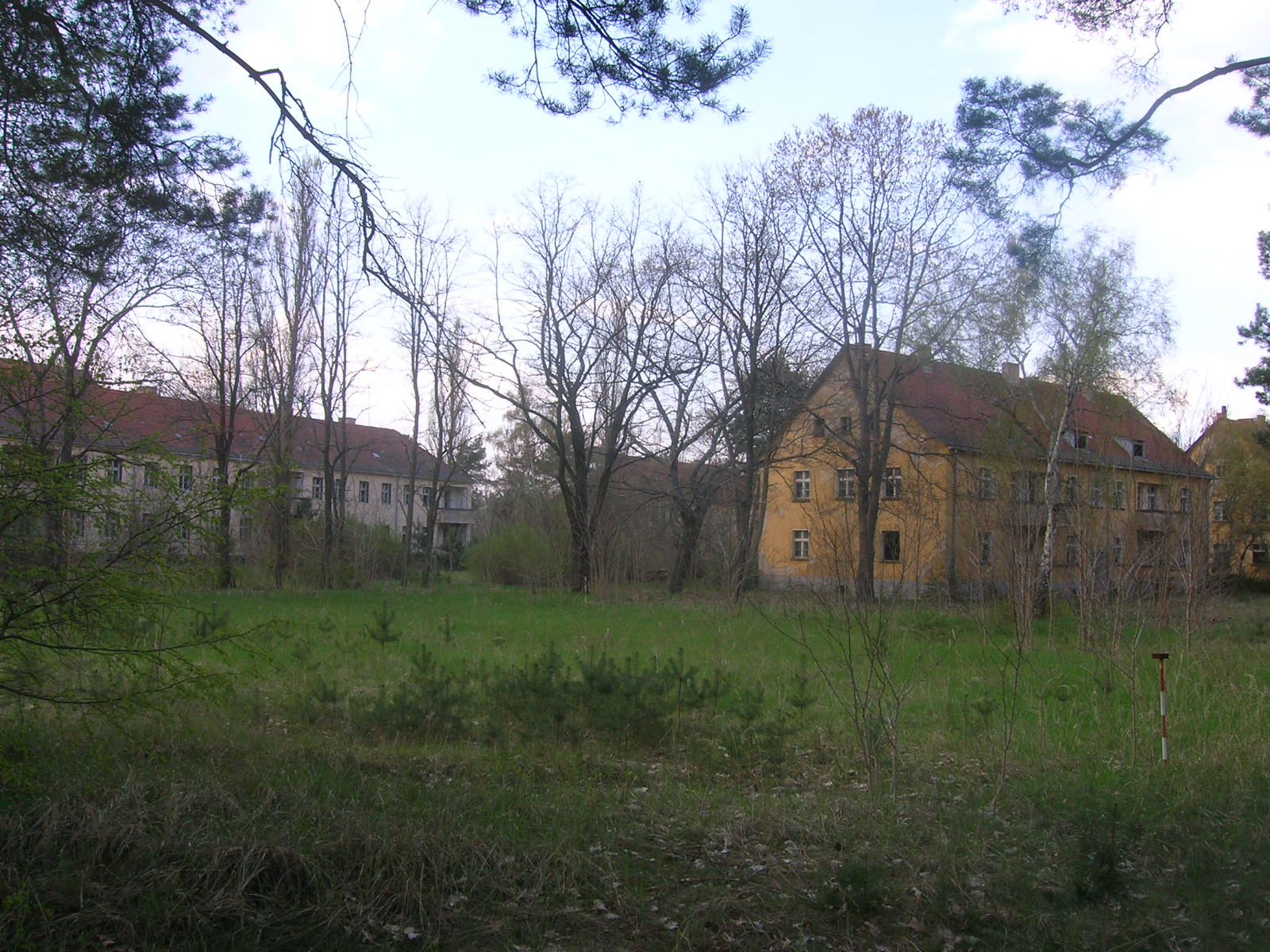
Barracks ruins in Kummersdorf Gut in Brandenburg

Soviet forces ordered to attack the Ninth Army numbered around 280,000 men, 7,400 guns and mortars, 280 tanks and self-propelled guns, and 1,500 aircraft. The force included six Air Corps and the 1st Guards Breakthrough Artillery Division, which was committed on April 25.

In the area to the west of the encirclement, Soviet forces were already positioned in depth, with (from the north)

- the 28th Army's 128th Rifle Corps in the area of Mittenwalde and Motzen.
  - the 3rd Guards Rifle Corps in the area of Tornow, Radeland, Baruth/Mark, Golssen.
- the 3rd Guards Army's 120th Rifle Corps south of Halbe.
  - the 21st Rifle Corps along the Berlin to Dresden Autobahn 13 to the west of Lübben.
- the 13th Army's 102nd Rifle Corps with the 117th Guards Rifle Division near Luckenwalde.
  - the 27th Rifle Corps's 280th Rifle Division at Jüterbog, where the Wehrmacht's main artillery school was located.

In terms of mechanized formations, the 3rd Guards Tank Army's 9th Mechanised Corps had its 71st Mechanized Brigade between Teupitz and Neuhof; the 4th Guards Tank Army's 68th Guards Tank Brigade stood near Kummersdorf Gut; and the 3rd Guards Army's 25th Tank Corps near Duben. Both the 3rd Guards Army and the 13th Army were to be heavily reinforced throughout the battle, as they were to be in the path of the German break-out. A reinforcement of particular note was the deployment of the 1st Guards Breakthrough Artillery Division (Note: Le Tissier 2005, p. 81, map p. 80; Artillery Breakthrough Divisions were specialised formations created to support the breakthrough battle of Soviet fronts. They belonged to the Reserve of the Supreme High Command (Stavka Reserve) and were not normally allocated for any other purpose. Such a division would not only add significantly to the number of guns, but would also bring with it sophisticated fire control and observation units that would enable a more rapid concentration of artillery fire in a sector. In the case of the battle of Halbe, the 1st GBAD contributed to the ability of 3rd Guards Army to continuously harass the encircled German forces with artillery fire, causing significant casualties to them.) under the command of the 3rd Guards Army in the sector of Teurow to Briesen.

== Breakout ==
=== The Twelfth Army's attack and the Ninth Army's plan ===
The relief attempt by the Twelfth Army started on April 24 with General Wenck's XX Corps attacking east and northwards. During the night, the Theodor Körner RAD Division attacked the Soviet 5th Guards Mechanised Corps, under the command of General I. P. Yermakov, near Treuenbrietzen. The next day, the Scharnhorst Division started to engage the Soviet troops in and around Beelitz and caught the 4th Guards Tank Army's 6th Guards Mechanized Corps' open flank, overrunning rear-area units. While the Ulrich von Hutten Division tried to reach Potsdam, with the Scharnhorst Division on its eastern flank, to open a corridor into Berlin, other elements of the Twelfth Army, as Wenck had agreed with Busse, pushed east to meet the Ninth Army.

In the words of Busse to Wenck, the Ninth Army was planning to push west "like a caterpillar". According to Busse's plan, the Tiger II heavy tanks of the 102nd SS Heavy Panzer Battalion should lead this caterpillar. The metaphor is quite apt because, as the head led the way, the rear-guard in the tail was going to be engaged in just as heavy fighting trying to disengage from following Soviet forces.

On the night of April 25/26, a new order was issued to the Ninth and Twelfth Armies by Hitler. It stipulated that:

- The Twelfth Army was to cut off the 4th Guards Tank Army by reaching the line Beelitz to Ferch, and to attack eastwards to unite with the Ninth Army.
- The Ninth Army was to hold on to its eastern front between Spreewald and Fürstenwalde, and to attack westward to link up with the Twelfth Army.
- Once both armies were combined, they were to attack northwards and open a corridor through the Red Army's encirclement of Berlin.

The final army conference of the Ninth Army took place at 15:00 on April 28. At this point, contact was lost with the V Corps and the V SS Mountain Corps. The conference found that the only possible break-out route had to lead through Halbe. This was not difficult for the Soviet commanders to deduce as well, while, on the other hand, Ninth Army had virtually no information about the Soviet force dispositions between it and the Twelfth Army. From this conference onward, command and control within the Ninth Army collapsed. There was almost no contact between the Ninth Army headquarters and Army Group Vistula, and little contact with formations under Ninth Army command. There were few or no maps to guide planning or combat operations.

In his book Slaughter at Halbe, Tony Le Tissier accused Busse of failing to exercise effective command and control of the encircled army, thereby contributing to the failure of successive break-out attempts. (Note: Le Tissier 2005, p. 117; The particular failings outlined by Le Tissier (who is a retired British Military Police officer) are of a "tardy" transfer of his HQ into Spreewald indicating "indecisiveness and reluctance to assume responsibility for the breakout". This delay led to an inability to exercise control from the new location due to congestion in the area. Furthermore, a failure to support the first breakout attempt by battle groups 'von Luck' and 'Pipkorn'. Finally, Le Tissier criticises him for placing his HQ into the most secure position of the break-out, and for "abandoning" the rearguard to its fate.) Le Tissier writes that Busse's initial movement of his HQ put him into a situation where he lost the ability to control the formations in the pocket. In his break-out plan, Ninth Army HQ was to be placed immediately behind the spearhead of the breakout, the 502nd SS Heavy Tank Battalion, which effectively reduced his ability to exercise command to the tactical level. He also accuses Busse of failing to adequately support the first breakout attempt (see below). The spearhead for the Ninth Army break-out plan on April 28 was to be the 502nd SS Heavy Panzer Battalion with remaining elements of the Panzergrenadier Division Kurmark. These units were split into two wedges. The northern wedge included the 502nd SS Panzer, Ninth Army HQ, XI SS Panzer Corps HQ, and Panzergrenadier Division Kurmark HQ. Remnants of the 21st Panzer Division were to cover in a north-westerly direction, while remnants of the 32nd SS Division 30. Januar was to cover the east and provide the rearguard.

=== The first breakout attempt ===
On the evening of April 25, Busse ordered the two battlegroups – Kampfgruppe von Luck, consisting of the 21st Panzer Division and Kampfgruppe Pipkorn, containing the 35th SS Police Grenadier Division, both named after their commanders – to attempt a break-out in the direction of the road centre of Baruth. The attempted breakout failed.

On the following day, the battle continued around Baruth, and tank-hunting teams blew up some of the dug-in Soviet tanks. Some supply canisters were delivered by air, but the strength of the battle group was insufficient to hold off a Soviet counter-attack. Heavy air attacks, a strike by the 4th Bomber Air Corps around noon with 55 aircraft, and repeated strikes by the 1st and 2nd Air Assault Corps with 8–10 aircraft each, a total of about 500 missions, caused heavy casualties and chaos. The forces of the two battle groups were destroyed, with Soviet reports claiming 5,000 prisoners taken, 40 tanks and self-propelled guns destroyed, and almost 200 guns and mortars captured. These forces and weapons were sorely missed during later break-out attempts. Pipkorn, the commander of the other battle group, was killed during the battle, and Luck taken prisoner on April 27. Few of the survivors of the battle reached the Elbe.

=== The second breakout attempt ===
The next morning, the German vanguard found a weak point between the two armies and many German troops were able to cross the Autobahn before the Soviet forces plugged the gap. The fighting was heavy and included continuous air attacks by the 2nd Air Army, as well as tree-bursting shells which rained wood splinters through the area. During the battle, the Soviet air force flew 2,459 attack missions and 1,683 bombing sorties. The German forces found that they could not use their armour as well as they had hoped, because it was vulnerable to destruction on the roads and could not get a good grip on the sandy soil of the pine forests in the region. The German vanguard managed to reach and cross Reichsstrasse 96, south of Zossen and north of Baruth, where it was spotted by a Luftwaffe plane. Hitler was furious when he realised that Busse was attempting to break out west and not to come to his aid in Berlin. His command sent several messages demanding that the army turn towards Berlin, but received no answer.

During the night and the next day (April 27), the German forces renewed their attack along two axes south from the village of Halbe towards Baruth, and in the north from Teupitz. This attack failed to produce a mass breakout although, like the day before, some groups were able to slip through the Soviet lines.

The front lines were not continuous because the dense forest terrain meant that visibility was down to metres, so there was danger of ambush and sudden assault for both sides. Smoke from burning sections of the forest, set alight by shell fire, helped the Germans and hindered the Soviets because it shielded the Wehrmacht troops from aerial reconnaissance and attack. On the other hand, the smoke hindered many groups because, without a compass and no sun, it was difficult to judge in which direction to go. The sandy soil precluded the digging of foxholes and there was no time to construct anything more elaborate, so there was little to no protection from wooden splinters created by artillery and tank HE shells, which the Soviet forces deliberately aimed to explode at tree-top height. (Note: This increased the amount of splinters caused by the explosions by adding wood splinters from the trees to the metal splinters from the projectiles. Because of the explosions location above the target it was very difficult, if not impossible to find cover protecting from these splinters. Similar casualties had been suffered by the American Army when it was attacked by Germans using artillery in a similar way during the Battle of Hürtgen Forest on the Western Front six months earlier.)

=== The third breakout attempt ===
On the night of April 28, the German forces tried another mass breakout from around Halbe. They broke through the 50th Guards Rifle Division and created a corridor from Halbe to the west, but paid a very high price. During April 28 and 29, the Soviets reinforced the flanks and attacked from the south, pouring in Katyusha rockets and shells, concentrating on the area around the Halbe.

By this time, the German troops were spread out over a wide area. The rearguard was at Storkow and the vanguard had linked up with the 12th Army at Beelitz. There were large groups around Halbe. The Soviet battle plan was to split the caterpillar into segments and then destroy each segment individually. The German battle plan was to continue moving west as fast as possible, keeping the corridor open.

The situation in Halbe was desperate for the Germans. Orders were still being issued to recognisable formations, but these were by now all mixed up. There was considerable tension between the Waffen-SS and Wehrmacht troops, with both accusing the other of helping their own while ignoring the plight of the other. In Halbe itself, some of the civilians took pity on very young soldiers ("Kindersoldaten") and allowed them to change out of their uniforms into civilian clothes. In one documented case, an SS man appeared at the door of a cellar intending to shoot a Panzerfaust into a cellar with about forty civilians and young Wehrmacht soldiers in it, only to be shot dead by one of the soldiers.

During the following days, the fighting became more and more confused. If the Germans came into contact with Soviet forces and overran a Soviet position, the Soviets counter-attacked not only with ground forces, but with artillery and aircraft. Losses on both sides were very high. By the time the fighting was over (around the end of April, beginning of May), about 25,000 German soldiers had escaped to join up with the 12th Army on the eastern side of Reichstrasse 2, the road running north-south through Beelitz.

Although this was the end of the Battle of Halbe, it was not the end of the breakout. Some 9th Army forces were again surrounded west of Luckenwalde by the north-westerly thrust of the 4th Guards Tank Army, only 10 km away from German 12th Army troops. The combined German 12th Army and 9th Army remnants then retreated westwards towards the Elbe so that they could surrender to American forces, which had halted their advance on the west bank of the river. The bulk of the fleeing German forces, along with several thousand civilians, reached and crossed the Elbe using the partially destroyed bridge at Tangermünde between 4 May and 7 May 1945, surrendering to elements of the U.S. 102nd Infantry Division, U.S. 9th Army, until Soviet forces reached the eastern bridgehead and halted further crossings.

== Aftermath ==
The casualties on both sides were high. There are about 24,000 Germans buried in the Halbe Forest Cemetery (German: Waldfriedhof Halbe), making it the largest war cemetery in Germany from World War II. About 10,000 are unidentified soldiers killed during the first half of 1945. The Red Army claimed to have killed 60,000 German soldiers and taken 120,000 as prisoners. The number of prisoners is supported by some sources, while other sources consider it to be exaggerated. Thousands of Red Army soldiers died trying to stop the breakout, most being buried at the Sowjetische Ehrenfriedhof of Baruth/Mark cemetery (de) next to the Baruth–Zossen road (Bundesstraße 96). These are the known dead, but the remains of more who died in the battle are found every year, so the total will never be known. Nobody knows how many civilians died, but it could have been as many as 10,000.

== Formations involved in the battle ==
=== Soviet Union ===
Ground Forces

- 1st Belorussian Front – Marshal Georgy Zhukov
  - 3rd Army – Colonel General Alexander Gorbatov
  - 69th Army – Colonel General Vladimir Kolpakchi
  - 33rd Army – Colonel General Vyacheslav Tsvetayev
  - 2nd Guards Cavalry Corps – Lieutenant General Vladimir Kryukov
- 1st Ukrainian Front – Marshal Ivan Konev
  - 3rd Guards Army – Colonel General Vasily Gordov
  - 13th Army – Colonel General Nikolai Pukhov
  - 28th Army – Lieutenant General Alexander Luchinsky
  - 3rd Guards Tank Army – Colonel General Pavel Rybalko
  - 4th Guards Tank Army – Colonel General Dmitry Lelyushenko

Air Forces – Chief Marshal of Aviation Alexander Novikov

- 2nd Air Army – Colonel General Stepan Krasovsky
- 16th Air Army – Colonel General Sergei Rudenko
- 18th Air Army – Air Vice Marshal Alexander Golovanov

=== Germany ===
- Ninth Army – General Theodor Busse
  - XI SS Panzer Corps – SS-General Matthias Kleinheisterkamp
  - V SS Mountain Corps – SS-General Friedrich Jeckeln
  - V Army Corps – General Ing. Kurt Wäger
- Army Support Troops
  - 21st Panzer Division
  - 10th SS Panzer Division "Frundsberg"
- Twelfth Army – General Walther Wenck
  - XX Corps – General Carl-Erik Koehler
  - XXXIX Panzer Corps – Lieutenant General Karl Arndt
  - XXXXI Panzer Corps – Lieutenant General Rudolf Holste
  - XXXXVIII Panzer Corps – General Maximilian von Edelsheim

== Bibliography ==
- Beevor, Antony (2002). Berlin: the Downfall, 1945. Penguin Books. ISBN 978-0-670-88695-1.
- Le Tissier, Tony (2005). Slaughter at Halbe. Stroud: Sutton. ISBN 978-0-7509-3689-7.
- Sennerteg, Niclas (2007). Nionde Arméns Undergång: Kampen om Berlin 1945 (in Swedish). Lund: Historiska Media. ISBN 978-91-85507-43-6.
- Ziemke, Earl Frederick (1969). The Battle for Berlin: End of the Third Reich. Ballantine; Macdonald. OCLC 59153427.
