= Fortress Division Frankfurt/Oder =

Frankfurt/Oder Fortress Division
- Active: 1945
- Disbanded: 1945
- Country: Nazi Germany
- Branch: Army

Commanders
- Notable commanders: Ernst Biehler; Hermann Meyer-Rabingen

The Frankfurt/Oder Fortress Division was a "fortress" division of the German Army (Heer) during the Second World War, active during the last months of the war in 1945.

The city of Frankfurt an der Oder controlled one of the major crossings across the Oder river by which Soviet forces advancing from the east could reach Berlin. The division was established in January 1945 to fortify the area and defend the city, in response to Soviet advances during the Vistula–Oder Offensive, which had brought attacking forces up to the eastern bank of the Oder.

It contained four "Fortress Grenadier" regiments, composed of a mixture of Volkssturm battalions and improvised "alarm" units, together with supporting artillery, engineer, and anti-tank units.

The division held its positions during February, March and April, while Soviet forces refitted and prepared to begin the spring offensive. On 16 April, a major attack was launched on the Oder line, and the division saw heavy fighting before being bypassed and besieged in Frankfurt.

== Order of battle ==
- 1st Fortress Grenadier Regiment (2 battalions + artillery battalion)
- 2nd Fortress Grenadier Regiment (2 battalions)
- 3rd Fortress Grenadier Regiment (2 battalions)
- 4th Fortress Grenadier Regiment (2 battalions)
- 1449th Fortress Infantry Battalion
- 84th Fortress Machine Gun Battalion
- 829th Fortress Machine Gun Battalion
- 59th Recruit and Training Artillery Battalion
- 1325th Fortress Artillery Battalion
- 1326th Fortress Artillery Battalion
- 3157th Fortress Artillery Battalion
- 952nd Pioneer Sperr Battalion
- XXVI Fortress Panzerjäger Detachment
