= Panzergrenadier Division Kurmark =

Panzergrenadier Division "Kurmark"
- Panzergrenadier-Division "Kurmark"
- Active: February – May 1945
- Country: Nazi Germany
- Branch: Army
- Type: Panzergrenadier
- Role: Armoured warfare
- Size: Division
- Garrison/HQ: Wehrkreis III: Frankfurt an der Oder
- Engagements: World War II: Eastern Front

Commanders
- Notable commanders: Willy Langkeit

The Panzergrenadier Division Kurmark, sometimes also referred to as Panzer Division Kurmark, was an armoured formation of the German Army during World War II. It was raised in January 1945 as part of the preparation for the Battle of Berlin. It was named after the Kurmark region of Brandenburg.

The division was formed at Frankfurt on the Oder in January 1945 from elements of the Grossdeutschland Panzer Grenadier Ersatz Brigade. It was an understrength unit. The unit did not receive enough motorized transport, so one of its Panzergrenadier battalions used bicycles and rode horses. During its short history, the division was commanded by Generalmajor Willy Langkeit.

The division was part of the German 9th Army (Army Group Vistula) and was deployed around Frankfurt on the Oder. It was surrounded alongside other Wehrmacht and SS formations of the 9th Army south-east of Berlin. They abandoned and blew up their last three King Tiger tanks on 30 April 1945 after they had run out of fuel. Remnants of the Panzergrenadier Division Kurmark broke out of the pocket and reached Jerichow on the Elbe where they surrendered to the U.S. Army in May 1945.

== Order of Battle, April 1945 ==
The division order of battle:

- Panzer-Regiment Kurmark
- Panzer-Grenadier-Regiment Kurmark
- Panzer-Füsilier-Regiment Kurmark (former Grenadier-Regiment 1235)
- Panzer-Artillerie-Regiment Kurmark
- Panzer-Aufklärungs-Abteilung Kurmark
- Panzer-Pionier-Battalion Kurmark
- Panzer-Nachrichten-Abteilung Kurmark
- Versorgungstruppen Panzergrenadier-Division Kurmark
