= 9th Army (Wehrmacht) =

- German: 9. Armee
- Active: 15 May 1940 – 1 May 1945
- Country: Nazi Germany
- Branch: German Army
- Type: Field army
- Size: 10 August 1942: 352,867; 1 July 1943: 334,552; 1 January 1945: 110,930
- Engagements: World War II

The 9th Army (German: 9. Armee) was a World War II German field army. It was activated on 15 May 1940 with General Johannes Blaskowitz in command.

== History ==
=== 1940 ===
The 9th Army first saw service along the Siegfried Line during its involvement in the invasion of France. It was kept as a strategic reserve and saw little combat.

=== 1941 ===
By 1941, the 9th Army was heavily strengthened and was deployed with Army Group Center for the invasion of the Soviet Union. During the initial phase of Operation Barbarossa the 4th Army formed the Southern pincer of a massive encirclement of Soviet troops deployed at Białystok, with the German 9th Army forming the Northern pincer. It continued its advance, and soon launched another pincer movement of Soviet troops at Smolensk. Even though successful in encircling Soviet troops, many Soviet troops escaped the pockets due to the large distances it had to secure. Hitler then sent the Panzer forces from Army Group Center to the northern and southern fronts to inflict severe economic damage to the Soviet Union. The 9th Army remained static from late July 1941 until October 1941 when Hitler finally decided to launch his long-awaited attack on Moscow.

In front of Moscow were two elaborate defensive lines: the first was 251 km long in front of Vyazma and the second on Mozhaysk. The 9th Army struck from the north, out-flanking the Vyazma defensive line and, along with the 3rd and 4th Panzer Armies, encircling Soviet forces at Vyazma. This would prove to be the last major encirclement operation launched by the 9th Army.

The 9th Army was placed on the northern flank as the German 2nd, 3rd and 4th Panzer Armies and the 4th Army would spearhead the offensive on Moscow. However, the attack failed due to the cold weather, a deteriorating supply situation, and stubborn Soviet resistance. The Germans suffered severe manpower losses and large parts of the 9th Army's troops were reallocated to the other depleted German Armies.

=== 1942 ===
The 9th Army remained in defensive positions in 1942, dug in 200 miles outside of Moscow as the Germans concentrated their offensive in Southern Russia. As the tide of the battle turned in Southern Russia, the Soviets launched Operation Mars, a major offensive against Army Group Center. The well dug in positions of Army Group Center defeated the Soviet offensive with heavy casualties.

=== 1943 ===
The Germans tried again in 1943 to regain the momentum in the Eastern Front by launching a massive pincer movement at the Kursk salient where 1/6th of all Soviet forces were deployed. The spearheads would be the German 9th Army and the 2nd Panzer Army from the north and the 4th Panzer Army along with Army Detachment Kempf from the south. The Soviets believed the heaviest blow would come from the north and massively reinforced the sector directly opposite 9th Army. By July 1943, the 9th Army had become the largest army ever fielded by the Germans even surpassing the much vaunted 6th Army with 335,000 men along with 600 tanks.

Leading the advance from the north, the 9th Army ran into powerful Soviet defenses, and it gained no more than 10 km on the first day. Walter Model ordered the capture of the key and heavily fortified Ponyri railway station, which was needed to continue the advance towards Kursk. However, the Soviets had massively reinforced the town's defenses, which meant the attackers took very heavy losses. After a week of ferocious fighting, the 9th Army had gained just 20 km. After being unable to breach the enemy lines, the army was then forced to deal with the Soviet counter-offensive which if not checked could have encircled the entire 9th Army. It fought a fighting withdrawal westwards throughout the remainder of 1943.

=== 1944 ===
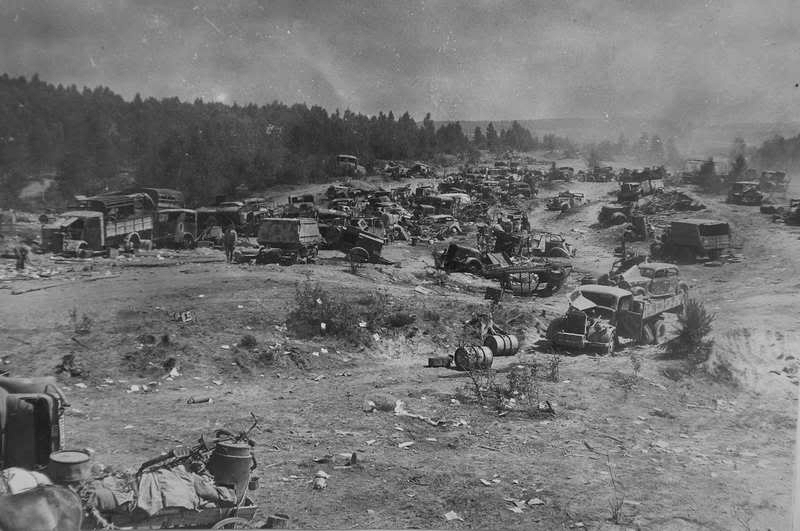
Destroyed and abandoned vehicles of the 9th Army in Belarus, June 1944

By 1944, the 9th Army was exhausted, but it had received some badly needed reinforcements and was defending the area of Bobruisk in the first half of that year. On 22 June, the third anniversary of Operation Barbarossa, the Soviets began their colossal Operation Bagration whose overall objective was the destruction of Army Group Center. The action against the 9th Army was called the Bobruysk Offensive. The 9th Army suffered nearly 80,000 casualties during Bagration of which 65,000 were taken prisoner. Nearly 40% of the 9th Army was destroyed in the summer of 1944. The army was then rebuilt by German units redeployed from Italy and was involved in the defence of Warsaw in autumn and winter of 1944.

=== 1945 ===
On 1 January 1945, the 9th Army (then under Army Group A) had a total strength of 110,930 soldiers, spread across four infantry divisions (17th, 73rd, 214th, 251st), three Volksgrenadier divisions (6th, 45th, 337th), two panzer divisions (19th, 25th), the German garrison in Warsaw and an autonomous blockade brigade.

The Red Army crossed Germany's border on January 12, 1945, and forced the 9th Army to retreat all along the front until it was deployed westward to the river Oder. Three of the 9th Army's formations were tasked with defending the Seelow Heights, which was the last defensible region before Berlin. To the north was the CI Army Corps, in the centre General Helmuth Weidling's LVI Panzer Corps, and to south of the Heights was the XI SS Panzer Corps. In addition south of Frankfurt (which was defended by the Frankfurt Garrison) was the V SS Mountain Corps. In total the 9th Army was reduced to 100,000 men and 800 tanks and assault guns against which the Soviets had over 1,000,000 men and 10,000 tanks and assault guns.

The Battle of the Seelow Heights started on 16 April 1945 when Marshal Georgy Zhukov's 1st Belorussian Front attacked across the Oder. The 9th Army held the line for about three days. After heavy fighting Weidling's LVI Panzer Corps was driven back towards Berlin. Most of the CI Army Corps divisions, now north of the salient created by the 1st Belorussian Front were reassigned along with LVI Panzer Corps to Army Detachment Steiner which was tasked with counter-attacking and pinching off the salient in an unrealistic plan conceived by Hitler. In the end Weidling's corps was driven back into Berlin and he was promoted to commander of the Berlin Defensive Area, reporting directly to Hitler. Theodor Busse and the rest of the 9th Army were driven into a pocket in the Spree Forest south of the Seelow Heights and west of Frankfurt an der Oder.

From inside the pocket west of Frankfurt Busse attempted a breakout to the west to join up with the 12th Army. The breakout, known as the Battle of Halbe, resulted in the destruction of the Ninth Army as a coherent force. Troops that were not captured or killed by the Soviets crossed the Elbe at Tangermünde and surrendered to the US Army.

== Commanders ==
No.	Portrait	Commander	Took office	Left office	Time in office
1	Johannes Blaskowitz	Generaloberst; Johannes Blaskowitz (1883–1948)	15 May 1940	29 May 1940	14 days
2	Adolf Strauß	Generaloberst; Adolf Strauß (1879–1973)	30 May 1940	14 January 1942	1 year, 229 days
3	Walter Model	Generalfeldmarschall; Walter Model (1891–1945)	15 January 1942	3 November 1943	1 year, 292 days
4	Josef Harpe	Generaloberst; Josef Harpe (1887–1968)	4 November 1943	20 May 1944	198 days
5	Hans Jordan	General der Infanterie; Hans Jordan (1892–1975)	20 May 1944	26 June 1944	37 days
6	Nikolaus von Vormann	General der Panzertruppe; Nikolaus von Vormann (1895–1959)	27 June 1944	31 August 1944	65 days
7	Smilo Freiherr von Lüttwitz	General der Panzertruppe; Smilo Freiherr von Lüttwitz (1895–1975)	1 September 1944	19 January 1945	140 days
8	Theodor Busse	Generalleutnant; Theodor Busse (1897–1986)	20 January 1945	2 May 1945	102 days

== See also ==
- 9th Army (German Empire) for the equivalent formation in World War I
- Army Group Centre
- Order of battle of the German Ninth Army, October 1941
- German Panzer Division Kurmark
